= Thomas Rea Greene =

Captain Thomas Rea Greene (February 3, 1904 – July 11, 1950) was president of the Greene Line of steamboats.

== Biography ==
He was born on February 3, 1904, in Ohio to Mary Catherine Becker and Gordon Christopher Greene aboard his father's steamboat on the Ohio River. His brother was Christopher Becker Greene. He married Letha Opal Cavendish and they had four children, including Jane Greene. In 1928 his brother Christopher won the Ohio-Mississippi inland waterway championship speed race by defeating Captain Frederick Way, Jr. and his ship the Betsy Ann. A rematch was held on July 16, 1929, between the Betsy Ann and the Thomas Greene with Thomas piloting.

In 1946 the Delta Queen was put up for auction by the owners. Greene became the new owner with a bid of $46,250. He had the boat refurbished.

He died on July 11, 1950, in Evansville, Indiana.
