= Natchez (boat) =

Various American boats

Coordinates: 29°57′19″N 90°03′44″W

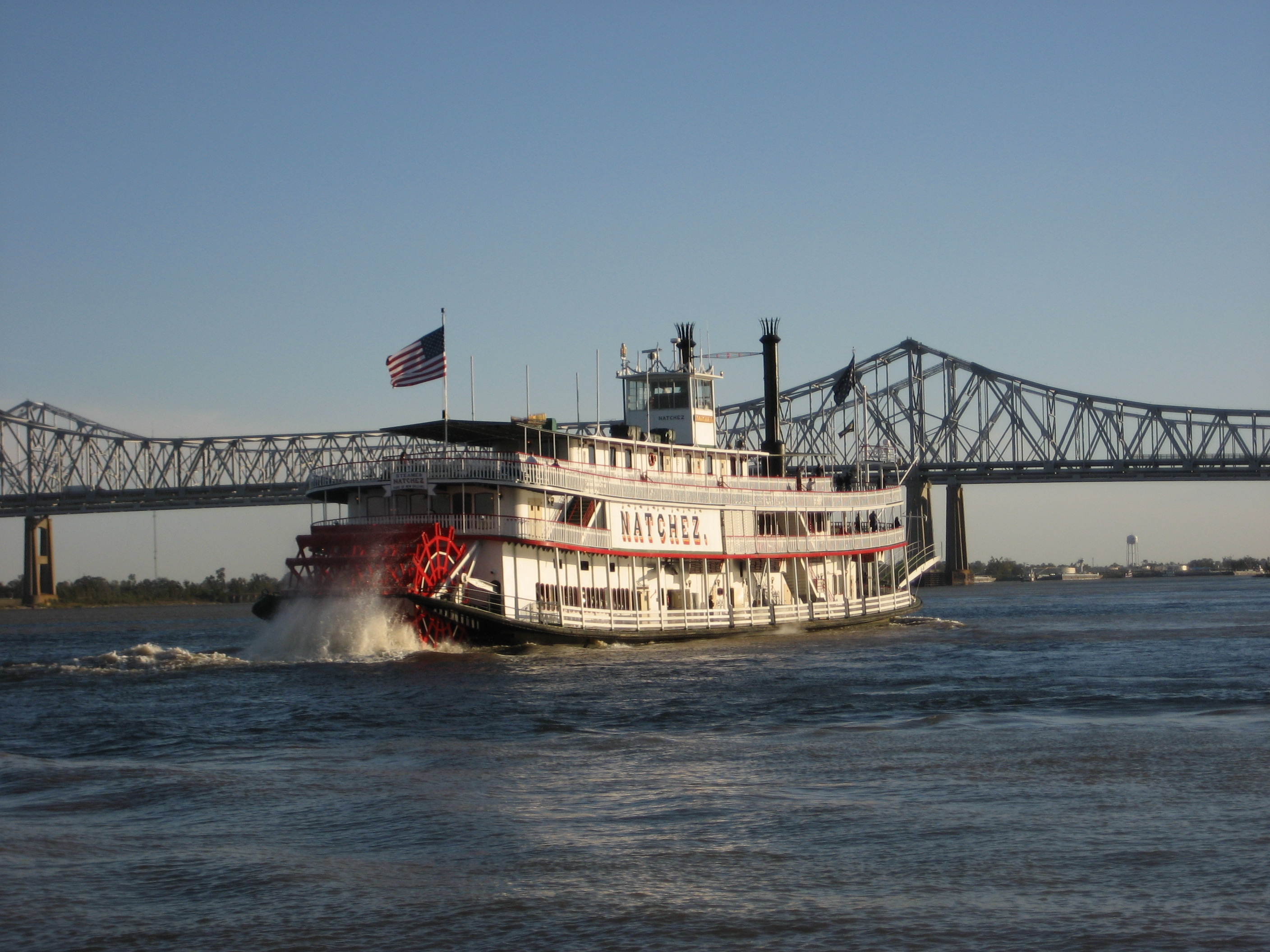
The SS Natchez in New Orleans

Natchez has been the name of several steamboats, and four naval vessels, each named after the city of Natchez, Mississippi or the Natchez people. The current one has been in operation since 1975. The previous Natchez were all operated in the nineteenth century, most by Captain Thomas P. Leathers. Each of the steamboats since Leathers' first had as its ensign a cotton bale between its stacks.

== Natchez IX ==
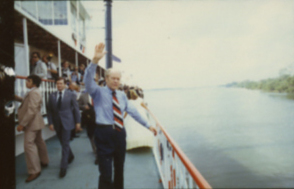
President Ford aboard the Natchez

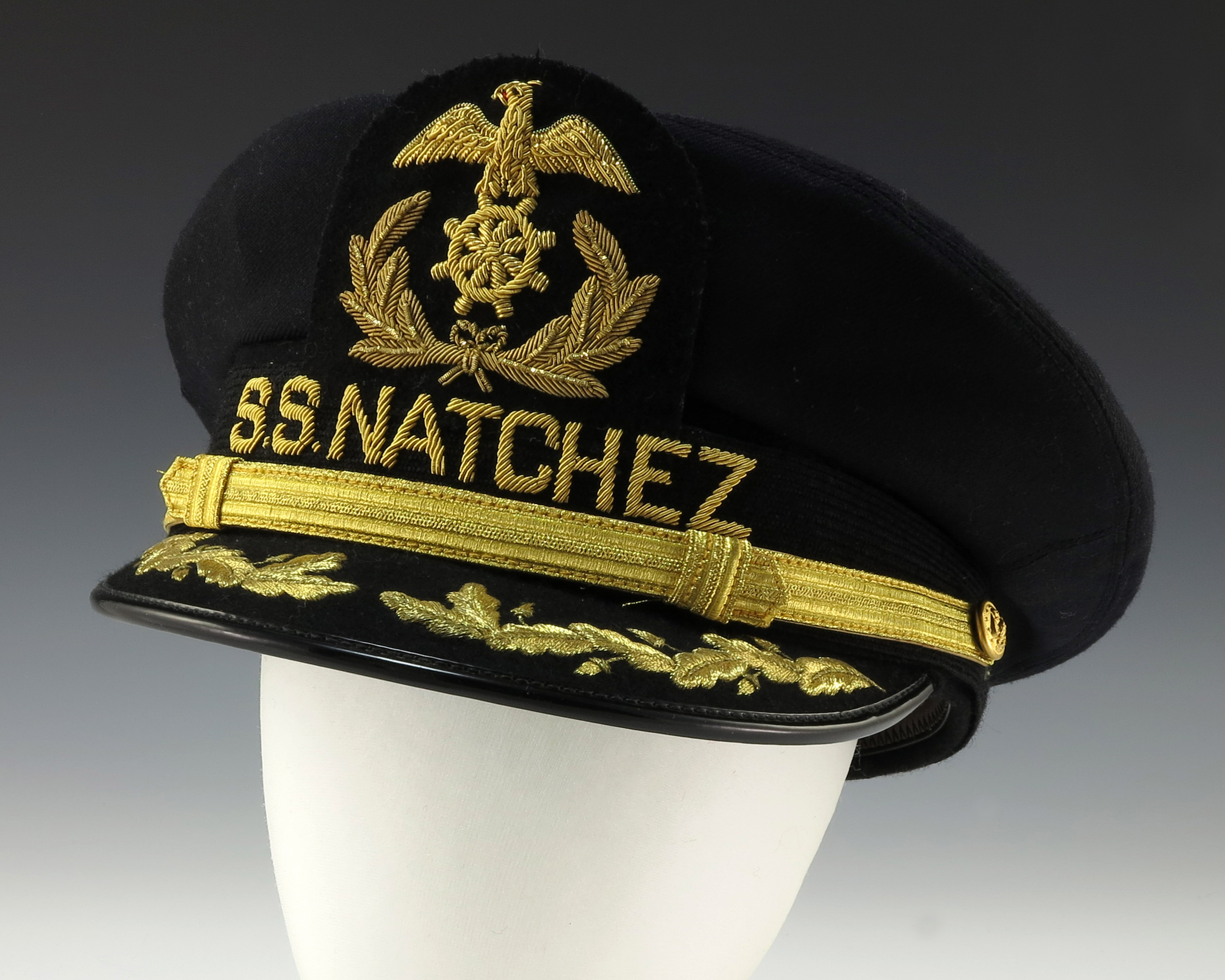
Black SS Natchez hat given to President Ford during his 1976 campaign trip down the Mississippi River.

The ninth Natchez, the SS Natchez, is a sternwheel steamboat based in New Orleans, Louisiana. Built in 1975 at Bergeron Shipyards in Braithwaite, Louisiana, 14 miles downriver from its French Quarter dock, she is sometimes referred to as the Natchez IX. She is operated by the New Orleans Steamboat Company and docks at the Toulouse Street Wharf. Day trips include harbor and dinner cruises along the Mississippi River.

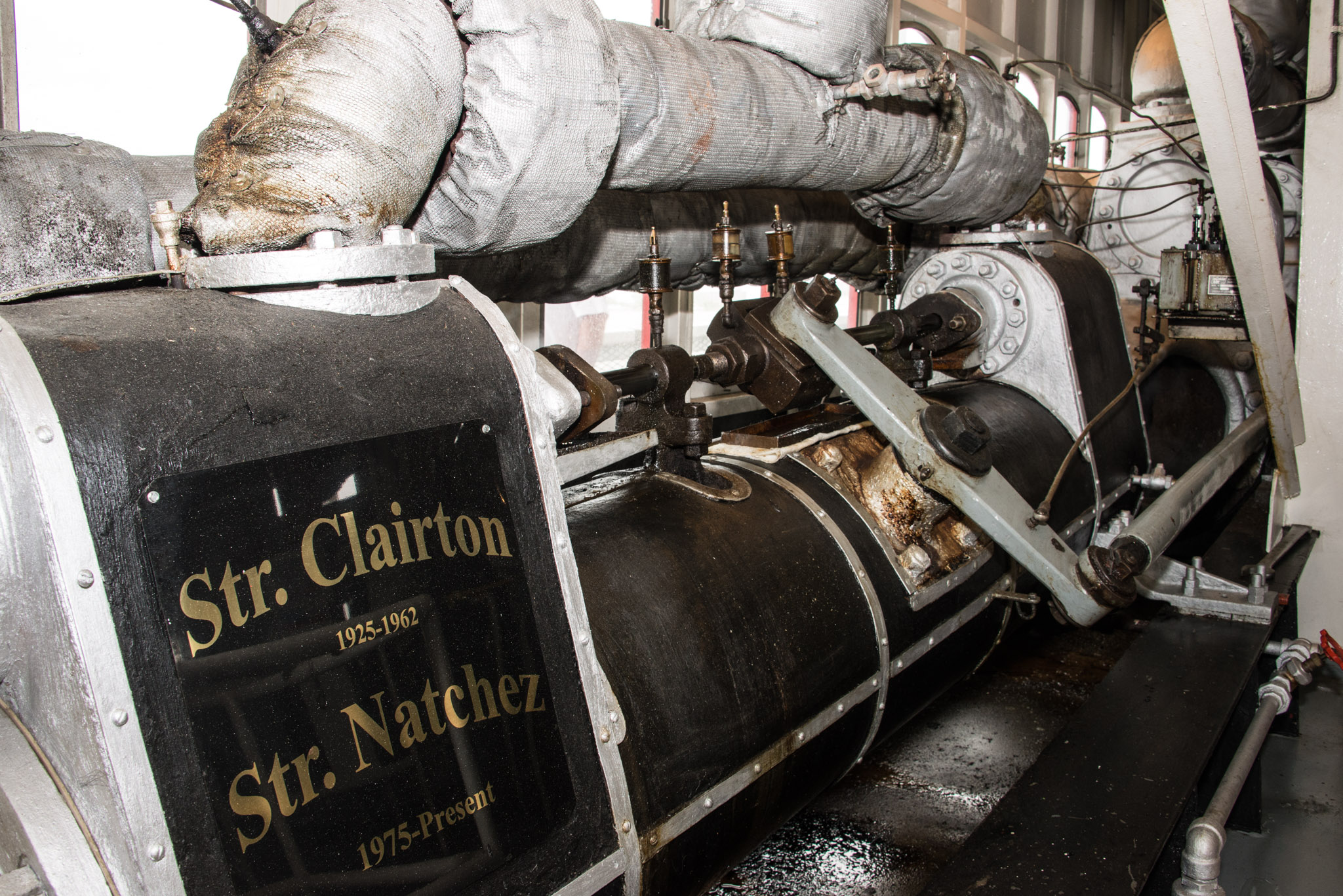
One of the two tandem-compound steam engines on the Steamboat Natchez. Each engine produces 1600 horsepower and has the dimensions 7 feet (2.1 m) by 30 inches (0.76 m) by 15 inches (0.38 m).

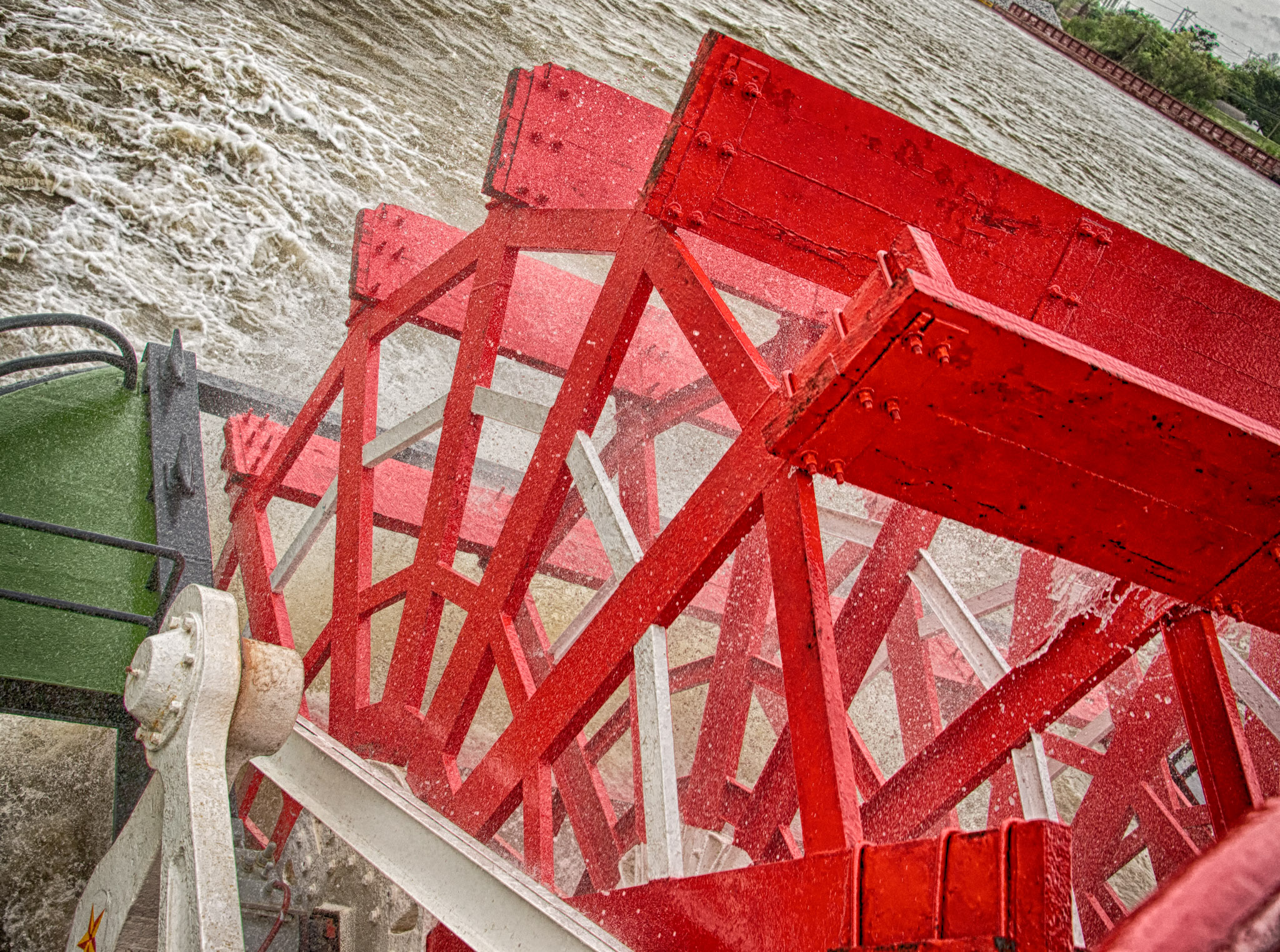
Paddle wheel on the Natchez

The Natchez IX is modeled not after the original Natchez, but rather the steamboats Hudson and Virginia. Her steam engines were built in 1925 for the steamboat Clairton, from which the steering system also came. From the SS J.D. Ayres was taken the copper bell, made of 250 melted silver dollars. The bell has on top a copper acorn that was once on the Avalon (now known as the Belle of Louisville), and on the Delta Queen. The Natchez IX also features a steam calliope that can play 32 notes. The wheel is made of white oak and steel, is 25 feet (7.6 m) by 25 feet (7.6 m), and weighs over 26 tons. The whistle came from a ship that sank in 1908 on the Monongahela River. The Natchez IX was launched in Braithwaite, Louisiana. She is 265 feet (81 m) long and 46 feet (14 m) wide, has a depth of 7.9 feet (2.4 m), and measures 1384 tons. Natchez IX is mostly made of steel, to comply with United States Coast Guard rules.

On September 25, 1976, the SS Natchez was used by U.S. President Gerald Ford for a presidential campaign trip to the Southern United States. While on the campaign trip, which was about a month after Ford was nominated for re-election as President of the United States, Ford campaigned from the Natchez during the six-hour Saturday cruise from Lutcher, Louisiana to Jackson Square, New Orleans, a historic park in the French Quarter of New Orleans, Louisiana. From there, Ford planned to spend three days in the south appealing to Southern conservatism by depicting his opponent, Jimmy Carter, as a free-spending liberal. To commemorate the event, Doc Hawley, captain of the SS Natchez, gave Ford a black hat with chinstrap and gold thread embroidering the word Natchez.

In 1982 the Natchez won the Great Steamboat Race, which is held every year on the Wednesday immediately before the first Saturday in May, as part of the Kentucky Derby Festival held in Louisville, Kentucky. She has also participated in other races, and has never lost. Those beaten by the Natchez include the Belle of Louisville, the Delta Queen, and the Mississippi Queen.

During the Hurricane Katrina disaster, the Natchez was temporarily moved upriver to Baton Rouge, Louisiana. Since then, operations have returned to New Orleans.

On May 3, 2022, a fire broke out on the Natchez. Firefighters were able to bring the blaze under control. The Natchez came back into service in 2023.

== Previous vessels ==
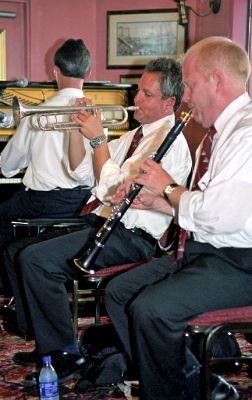
Jazz band on the Natchez, 2005

The first Natchez was a low pressure sidewheel steamboat built in New York City in 1823. It originally ran between New Orleans and Natchez, Mississippi, and later catered to Vicksburg, Mississippi. Its most notable passenger was the Marquis de Lafayette, the French hero of the American Revolutionary War, in 1825. Fire destroyed her, while in New Orleans, on September 4, 1835.

The second Natchez was the first built for Captain Thomas P. Leathers, in 1846. Built in Cincinnati, Ohio, as were all of her successors owned by Capt. Leathers, she was a fast two-boiler boat, 175 feet (53 m) long, with red smokestacks, that sailed between New Orleans and Vicksburg, Mississippi. Leathers sold this boat in 1848. She was abandoned in 1852.

The third Natchez was funded by the sale of the second and built in Cincinnati. She was 191 feet (58 m) long. Leathers operated it from 1848 to 1853. On March 10, 1866, she sank at Mobile, Alabama due to rotting.

The fourth Natchez was built in Cincinnati. She was 270 feet (82 m) long, had six boilers, and could hold 4,000 bales of cotton. She operated for six weeks. On January 1, 1854, the ship collided with the Pearl at Plaquemine, Louisiana, causing the Pearl to sink. A wharf fire on February 5, 1854 at New Orleans caused her to burn down, as did 10-12 other ships.

The fifth Natchez was also built in Cincinnati, as Captain Leathers returned there quickly after the destruction of the fourth. She was also equipped with six boilers, but this one could hold 4,400 cotton bales. This one was used by Leathers until 1859. In 1860 she was destroyed while serving as a wharfboat at Baton Rouge, Louisiana.

The sixth Natchez was again a Cincinnati-built boat. She was 273 feet (83 m) long. The capacity was 5,000 cotton bales, but the power remained the same. It helped transport Jefferson Davis from his river plantation home on the Mississippi River after he heard he was chosen president of the Confederacy. Even after the war, Davis would insist on using Leathers' boats to transport him to and from his plantation, Brierfield. Natchez was also used to transport Confederate troops to Memphis, Tennessee. After Union soldiers captured Memphis, the boat was moved to the Yazoo River. On March 13, 1863, she was burned either by accident or to keep her out of Union hands at Honey Island. Remains were raised from the river in 2007.

The seventh Natchez was built in 1869 in Cincinnati. She was 301 feet (92 m) long, had eight boilers and a capacity of 5,500 cotton bales. In her 9 1/2-year service, she made 401 trips without a single deadly accident. It became famous as the participant against another Mississippi paddle steamer, the Robert E. Lee, in a race from New Orleans to St. Louis in June 1870, immortalized in a lithograph by Currier and Ives. This Natchez had beaten the previous speed record, that of the J. M. White in 1844. Stripped down, carrying no cargo, steaming on through fog and making only one stop, the Robert E. Lee won the race in 3 days, 18 hours and 14 minutes. By contrast, the Natchez carried her normal load and stopped as normal, tying up overnight when fog was encountered. Despite this she berthed only six hours later. One way Leathers tried to speed up his boat was giving all of his workers whiskey. When Leathers finally dismantled the boat in Cincinnati in 1879, this particular Natchez had never flown the American flag.

Noted steamboat captain and historian Frederick Way, Jr. disputes this version of history somewhat. He cites Johnny Farrell, second engineer of the Natchez: "This old idea about the two boats preparing for days for the race, tearing down bulkheads, putting up wind sheaves, and a lot of other stuff, is not true. When I went aboard the Lee, all they had done was to move the coal bunkers a little forward... On our boat there was absolutely no preparation whatever. There was no such thing as colors flying, bands playing, and the decks of both boats crowded with ladies and gentlemen."

The eighth Natchez was launched August 2, 1879 by the Cincinnati Marine Ways. She was 303.5 feet (92.5 m) long, with a beam of 45.5 feet (13.9 m), 38.5 feet floor, and 10 feet (3.0 m) hold depth. She had eight steel boilers that were 36 feet (11 m) long and had a diameter of 42 inches (1,100 mm), and thirteen engines. She had 47 elegant staterooms. Camp scenes of Natchez Indians wardancing and sunworshipping ornamented the fore and aft panels of the main cabin, which also had stained glass windows depicting Indians. The total cost of the boat was $125,000. Declaring that the War was over, on March 4, 1885, Leathers raised the American flag when the new Natchez passed by Vicksburg, the first time he hoisted the American flag on one of his ships since 1860. By 1887 lack of business had stymied the Natchez. In 1888 she was renovated back to perfect condition for $6000. In January 1889 she burned at Lake Providence, Louisiana. Captain Leathers, deciding he was too old to build a new Natchez, retired. Jefferson Davis sent a letter of condolences on January 5, 1889, to Leathers over the loss of the boat. Much of the cabin was salvageable, but the hull broke up due to sand washing within.

Later, the Natchez was captained by Bowling S. Leathers and his wife, Blanche Douglass Leathers in the 1890s. In 1896, Blanche Leathers was commanding the ship and it became her own.

== Thomas Leathers ==
The captain of the second-eighth Natchez, Thomas P. Leathers, sometimes nicknamed "Old Push", was described as savage, reckless, and colorful. He loved to prove his boats were the fastest. He would sometimes throw fatty bacon and hog fat into the engine to dramatically increase the speed of his boats. He would sometimes cause other boats to slow down by quickly racing in front of them. He died in June 1896, at the age of 80, after being hit by a bicyclist while walking down a New Orleans street.

== Military vessels named Natchez ==
Three vessels used by the US Navy have also borne the name Natchez.

The first was USS Natchez (1827), an 18-gun sloop-of-war with a complement of 190 men, built by Norfolk Navy Yard in 1827. She mainly patrolled the Caribbean. After a final tour of duty in the Caribbean in 1839, Natchez was scrapped at the New York Navy Yard in 1840.

A survey vessel, Oceanographer, became USS Natchez (PG-85) on April 15, 1942. A few weeks later, on May 28, 1942 she was reverted to her original name and status as Oceanographer (AGS-3).

The third US Navy vessel to bear the name, USS Natchez (PG-102), was laid down March 16, 1942 by Canadian Vickers Ltd., Montreal, Quebec, Canada for the Royal Navy as River-class frigate HMS Annan (K297). Subsequently, she was assigned to the Royal Canadian Navy, designated HMCS Annan (K297). During construction she was acquired by the U.S. Navy and renamed USS Natchez (PG–102). She served with distinction in World War II.

The Brazilian Navy has also had a ship named Natchez. It was built in 1838 in Baltimore, Maryland, named Natchez by some merchants, until the government of Brazil bought it from them, and converted it for military use. It collided with another ship in Brazil on November 21, 1842, and sank.

== Gallery ==
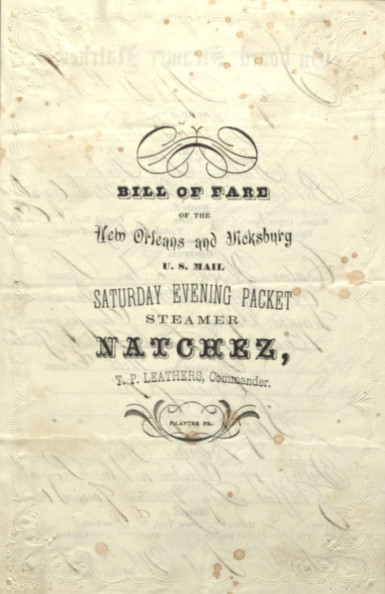
Menu from the steamboat Natchez on April 4, 1858.

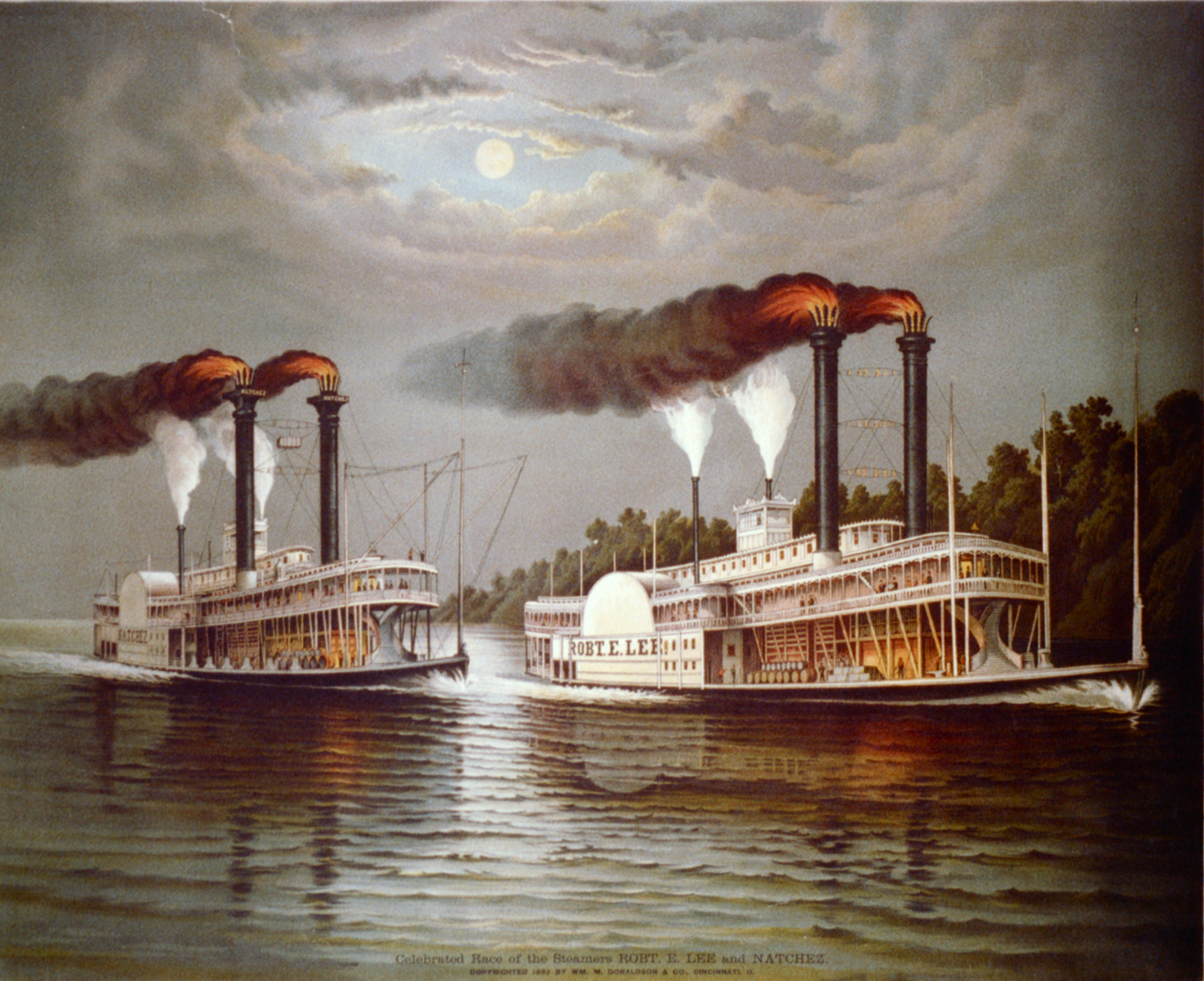
Celebrated race of the steamers Robert E. Lee and Natchez, 1870

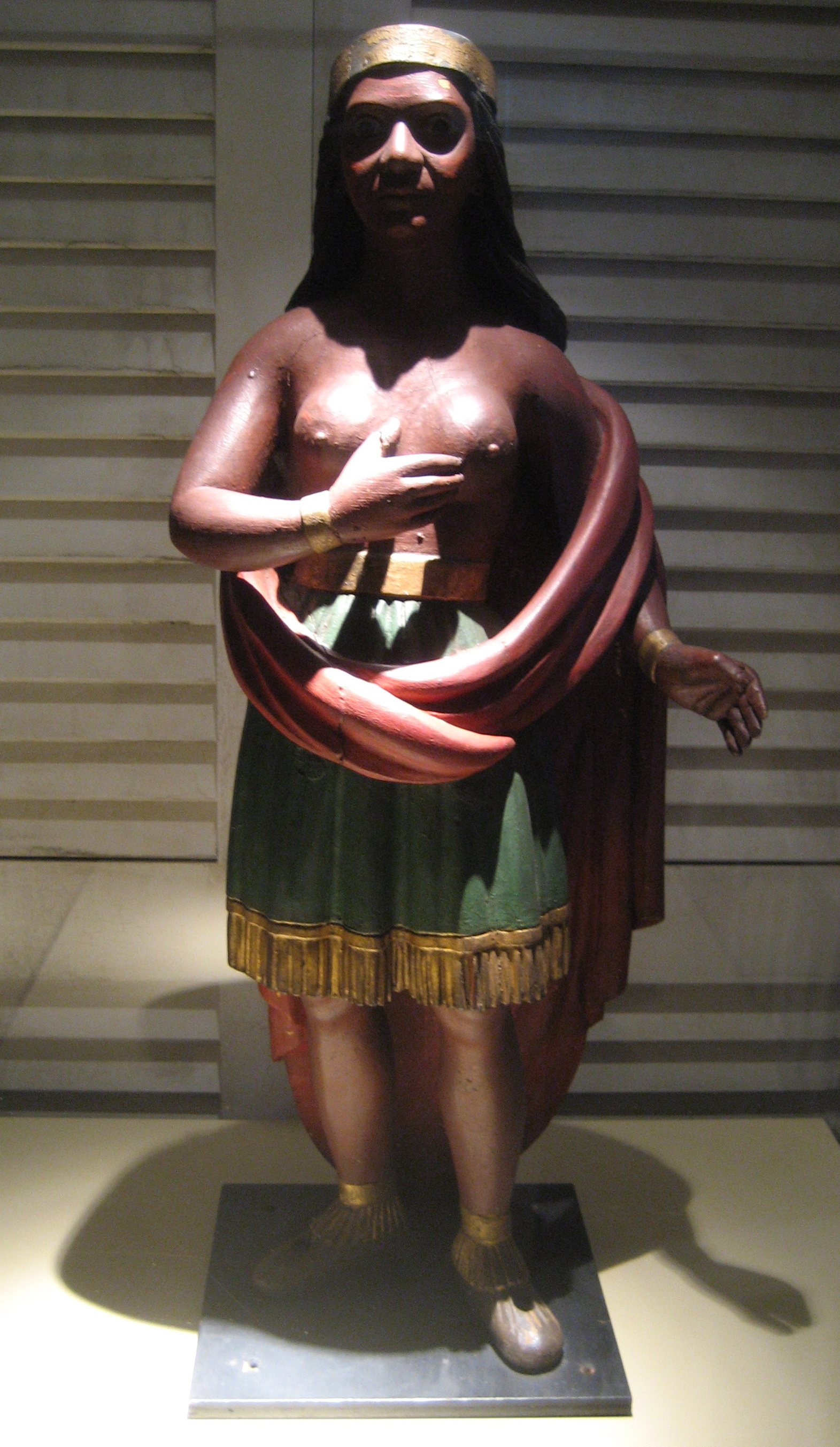
Wooden figure from the 1879 Natchez.

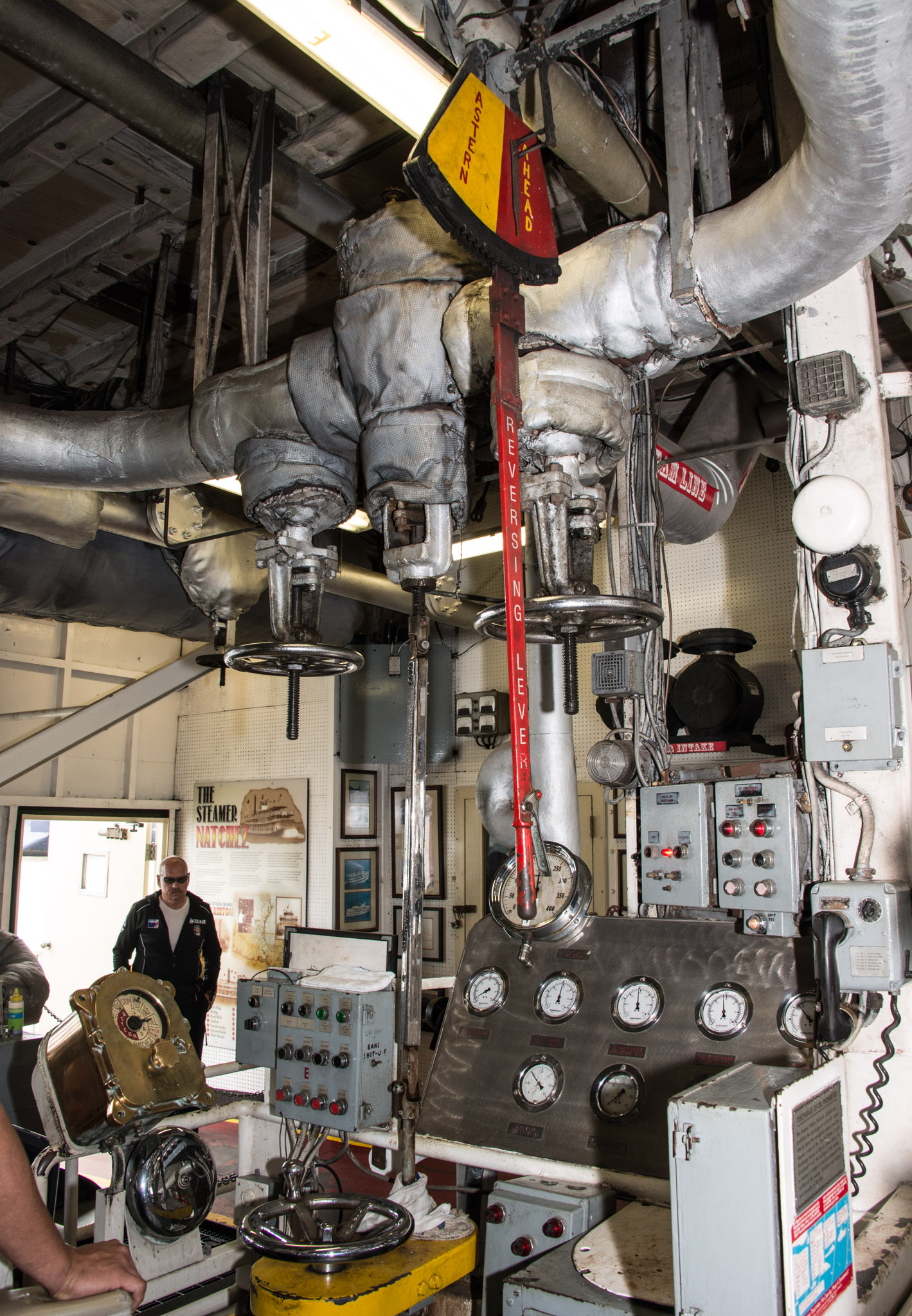
The Steamboat Natchez's two tandem-compound steam engines are controlled from this station. The engine order telegraph is on the left. Overhead throttles control the flow of steam to the two engines. The red lever overhead reverses the engines. The operator monitors steam pressure, condenser vacuum, and other parameters on the gauges.

== See also ==
- Paddle steamer
- Riverboat
- Steam yacht
- Steamboat
- Steamboats of the Mississippi
