= The Kentuckian =

The Kentuckian may refer to:

- The Kentuckian (1955 film), a 1955 Technicolor and CinemaScope adventure film
- The Kentuckian (painting), 1954 painting by Thomas Hart Benton based on the film
- The Kentuckian (1908 film), a short silent black and white western film
- The Kentuckians 1921 American silent drama film by Charles Maigne.
