= Betty Blake =

American historic preservationist

Betty Blake (September 20, 1931 – April 13, 1982) was an American historic preservationist and promoter. She was best known for preserving historic riverboats in Cincinnati. Her biggest preservation project was helping to save the Delta Queen.

== Biography ==
Blake was born on September 20, 1930, in Lexington, Kentucky, and grew up in Carlisle, Kentucky. Blake was part of the campaign to help elect her father, Stanley Blake, to the Kentucky Senate in 1936. Blake attended the University of Kentucky and earned a degree in business in 1952. Blake's first job was working at WLW-TV in Cincinnati, and while she was there, applied to work as a salesperson for Avalon Steamboat Lines. When she applied for the job, the president said, "Look, this little lady wants to sell our boat. Isn't that wonderful?" Blake was successful at the job and when the company was sold to the Belle of Louisville, Blake went to the Greene Line Inc, as the public relations director for the Delta Queen in 1962.

In the 1950s the Delta Queen was "a floating hotel with a troubled occupancy rate" but Richard Simonton rescued the boat when he bought a controlling interest in the Greene Line in 1958. Blake promoted the Delta Queen using a steamboat race between the Queen and the Belle of Louisville in 1963. The race eventually became an annual attraction during Kentucky Derby Week. But in 1966, Congress passed the first Safety at Sea Law that threatened to put the Delta Queen out of business. After consulting with attorney William Kohler, Richard Simonton, Bill Muster, and Edwin "Jay" Quinby traveled to Washington, DC, to save their boat. As chairman of the board of Greene Line Steamers, Jay Quinby testified before the Senate to ask for an exemption to the law. Greene Line had to renegotiate the exemption every two to four years. In 1970 Betty Blake and Bill Muster led the campaign to get the exemption and Blake collected signatures for a petition on a roll of newsprint and unfurled it on the steps in front of the Capitol Building. They won the exemption at the very end of 1970, despite Congressman Edward A. Garmatz, Chairman of the House Committee on Merchant Marine and Fisheries, who tried to block the exemption.

Thanks to the efforts of Betty Blake and Bill Muster, the Delta Queen was listed on the National Register of Historic Places in 1970 and was later declared a National Historic Landmark in 1989.

In 1975, Blake was one of two women on the board of trustees of the Greater Cincinnati Chamber of Commerce. When she was promoted to president of the Delta Queen Steamboat Company in 1976, she became the first woman to serve as the president of a major American cruise line. In 1979, Blake left the Delta Queen to open her own public relations and marketing firm called Betty Blake & Co. A 400-seat passenger boat, the Betty Blake, was named after her on April 12, 1980.

Blake became ill in December 1981. She died from stomach cancer in Georgetown, Kentucky, on April 13, 1982. Blake was buried in Carlisle Cemetery where her headstone reads only "Hi There." In 1996, Blake was inducted into the National Rivers Hall of Fame.
