= Gordon C. Greene (steamboat) =

History

United States
- Name: Cape Girardeau; Gordon C. Greene; Sara Lee; River Queen
- Owner: Eagle Packet Company (1923-32); Greene Line (1935-1952); et al.
- Builder: Howard Ship Yards & Dock Company, Jeffersonville, Indiana
- Launched: 1923
- Christened: 24 April 1924, by Miss Christine Rowling
- In service: April 1924
- Out of service: December 1967
- Fate: Sank, 3 December 1967

General characteristics
- Type: Sternwheel paddle steamer
- Length: 201 ft (61 m)
- Beam: 38 ft (12 m)
- Draft: 6 ft 6 in (1.98 m)
- Propulsion: Steam engine

Gordon C. Greene was a paddle steamer, launched in 1923, that operated under several names before sinking in St. Louis in 1967.

== Ship history ==
The ship was built by the Howard Ship Yards & Dock Company (now Jeffboat) at Jeffersonville, Indiana, for the Eagle Packet Company as the Cape Girardeau. She was engaged in the packet trade, initially carrying passengers and freight between Louisville, Kentucky and St. Louis, Missouri, with annual trips to New Orleans for Mardi Gras.

In 1935 she was sold to Greene Line for $50,000, and renamed Gordon C. Greene, after the founder of the company, to operate as a tourist boat on the Ohio River between Pittsburgh and Cincinnati, while still often making her annual trips to New Orleans. In 1936 her Captain, Thomas R. Greene added an extra "sun deck", increasing the number of passenger cabins, and she was later converted from coal to oil fuel. However, as time went on the boat suffered a series of mechanical breakdowns and was eventually withdrawn from service in 1951.

In 1952 she was sold, and then passed through a series of owners, none of whom seemed able to make her a profitable concern. First, under the name Sara Lee, she was converted to a floating hotel at Portsmouth, Ohio. Soon afterwards she was renamed River Queen to serve as a floating restaurant at Owensboro, Kentucky, and was later fitted out as a tourist attraction at Bradenton, Florida. In 1954 her boilers were removed and were fitted into the steamboat Avalon (now the Belle of Louisville). In 1960 she was towed to New Orleans to be converted to a night club, but was soon at Hannibal, Missouri, serving as a restaurant. In 1964 she was sold for the last time, and was based at St. Louis as a bar and restaurant. There, on the morning of 3 December 1967, the River Queen sank at her moorings.

== Filmography ==
The ship appeared in several films.

- Steamboat Round the Bend (1935)
- Gone with the Wind (1939)
- The Kentuckian (1955)
