= Music City Queen =

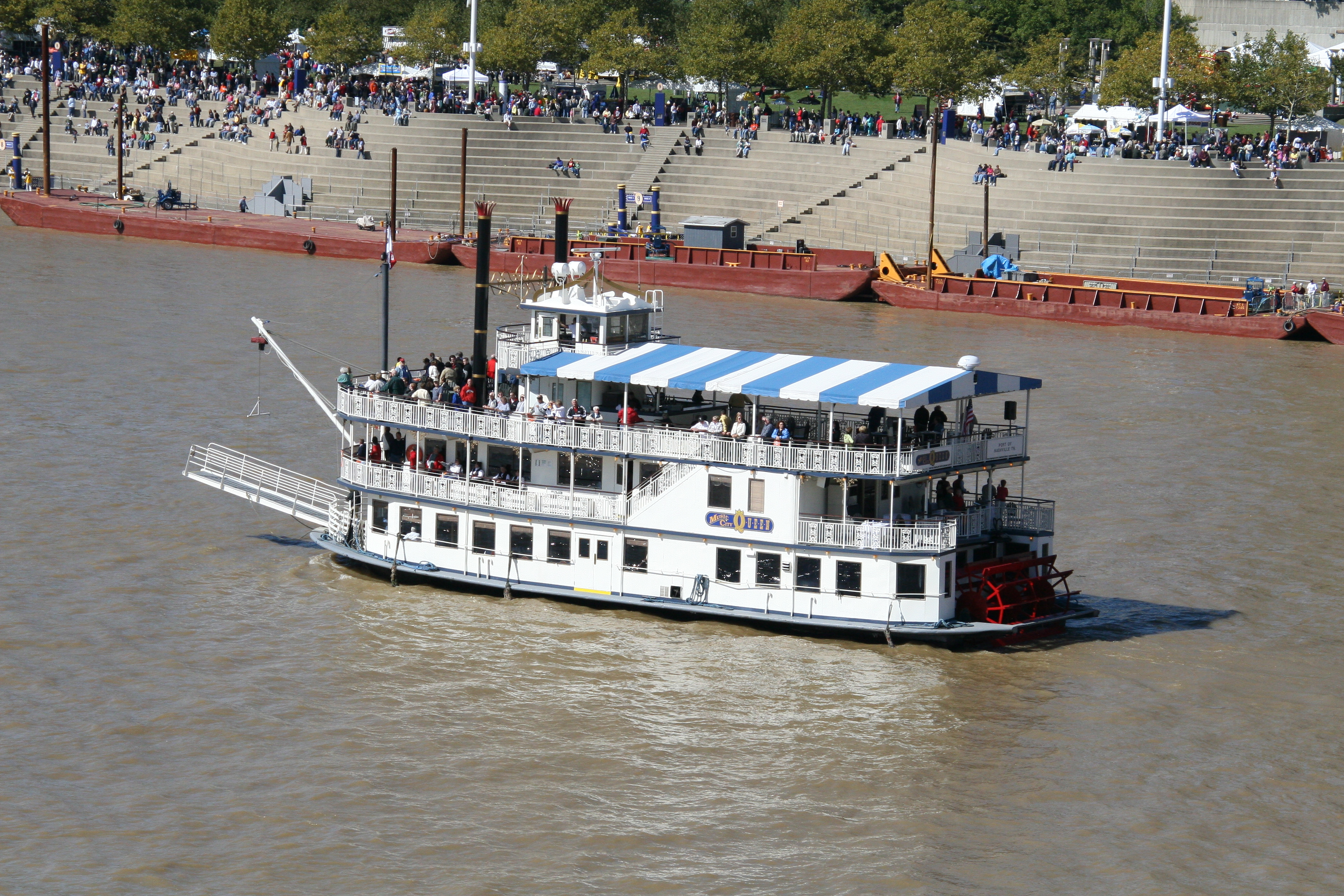
The Music City Queen at the 2006 Tall Stacks Festival in Cincinnati.

Music City Queen was a replica showboat formerly operating for entertainment purposes on the Cumberland River in the southern United States. It was the smaller of two stern-wheel paddle steamers based at Opry Mills in Nashville, Tennessee; the other is the General Jackson.

The Music City Queen is now operated by Massachusetts Bay Lines in the Boston area.
