= Tall Stacks =

Riverboat-themed festival in Cincinnati, Ohio, United States

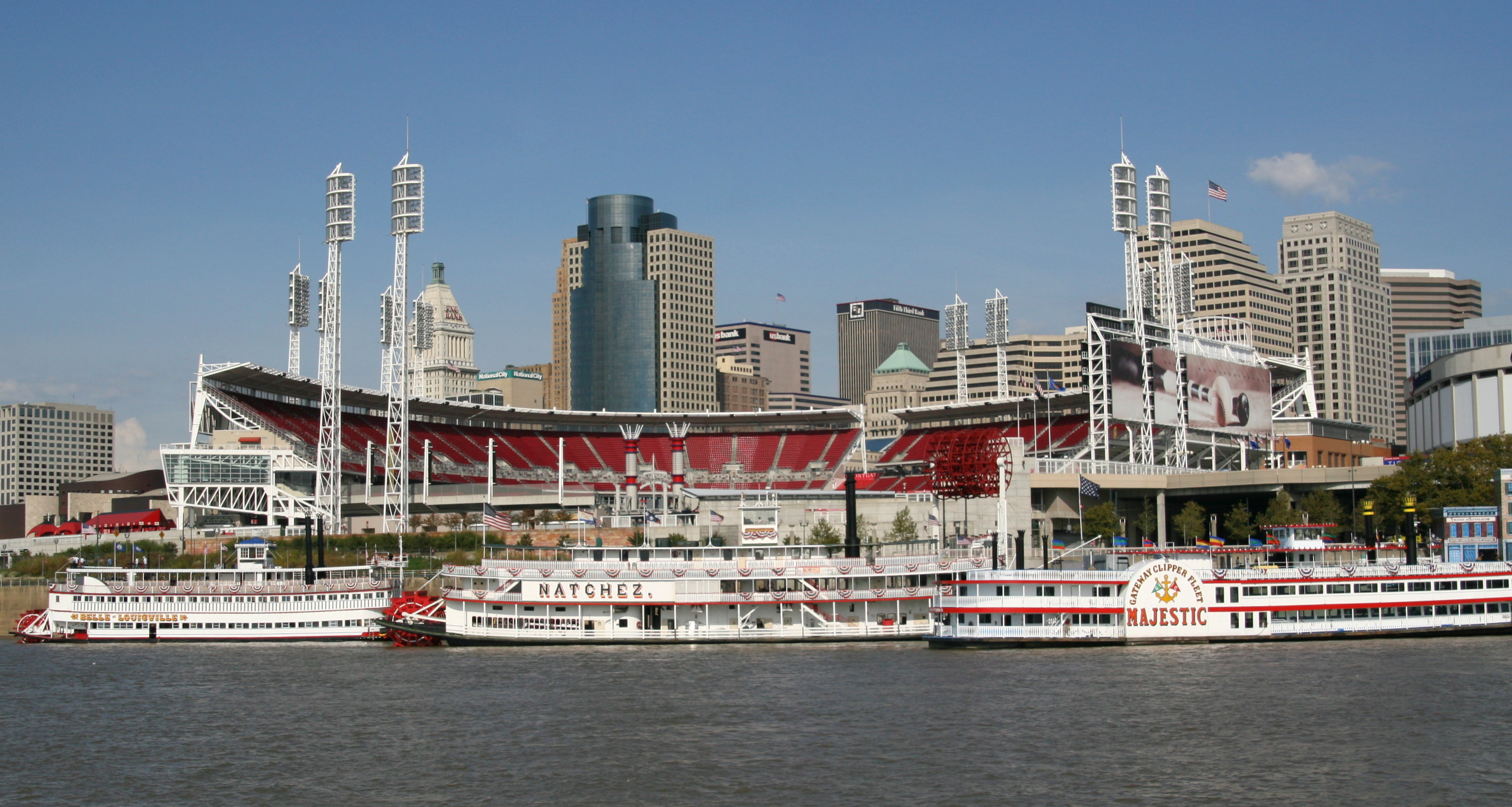
The Belle of Louisville, Natchez, and Majestic preparing for 2006 Tall Stacks

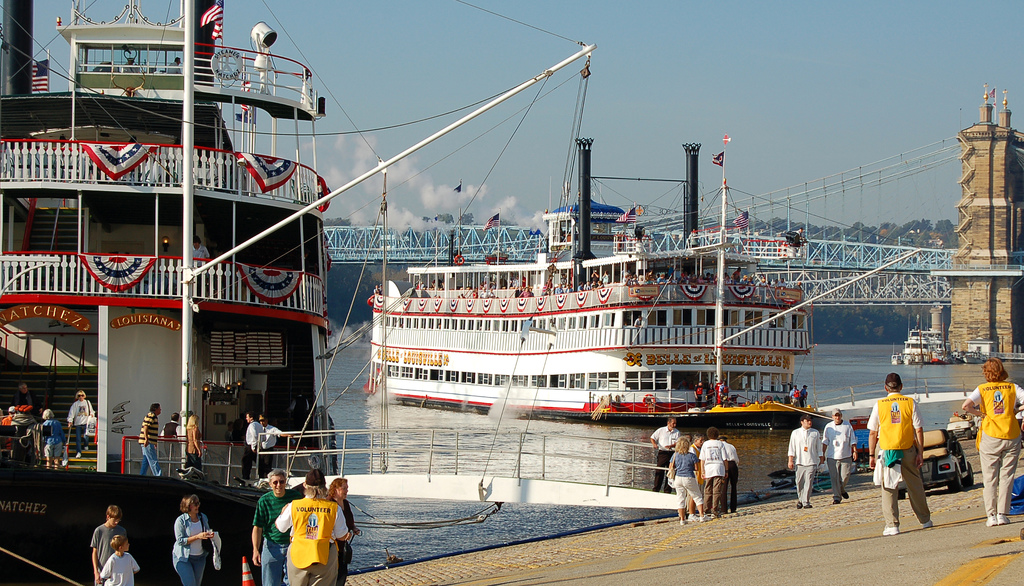
The Belle of Louisville docks next to the Natchez in Cincinnati for Tall Stacks.

Tall Stacks, formally known as the Tall Stacks Music, Arts, and Heritage Festival, was a festival held every three or four years in the Cincinnati, Ohio, USA, area, which celebrated the city's heritage of the riverboat. The sixth (and, to date, final) edition was held on October 4 to 8, 2006. The festival typically featured a number of vintage and replica steamboats from across the eastern United States, which docked along the Ohio River shoreline in Cincinnati and across the river in Covington and Newport, Kentucky.

After the 2009 event was cancelled a festival was tentatively scheduled for 2010, but was not held due to the poor economy and lack of corporate sponsors. Organizers later set a date of October 3–7, 2012, which was subsequently also cancelled.

== History ==
The first Tall Stacks festival was held in October 1988 as a part of Cincinnati's bicentennial celebration. Fourteen riverboats made appearances in the three-day festival, which included tours of the boats, cruises and races between the rivals Delta Queen and Belle of Louisville — a renewal of their annual race during the Kentucky Derby Festival in Louisville, Kentucky. More than 700,000 people attended.

Subsequent festivals:

- 1992: The event expanded to four days. Attendance increased to 800,000, which was the largest attendance for any event in Cincinnati until the BLINK Light and Art Festival broke the record in 2019 and again in 2022.
- 1995: The schedule was moved up a year to prevent a near-conflict with the 1996 Summer Olympics in Atlanta, Georgia. The event expanded to five days and 19 riverboats. The Kentucky cities added a Civil War re-enactment to the festivities and attendance increased again to 850,000, a new record.
- 1999: Though attendance was down, Tall Stacks '99 drew 660,000 and was named the US's top tourism event by the American Bus Association. Nineteen riverboats again traveled to the festival.

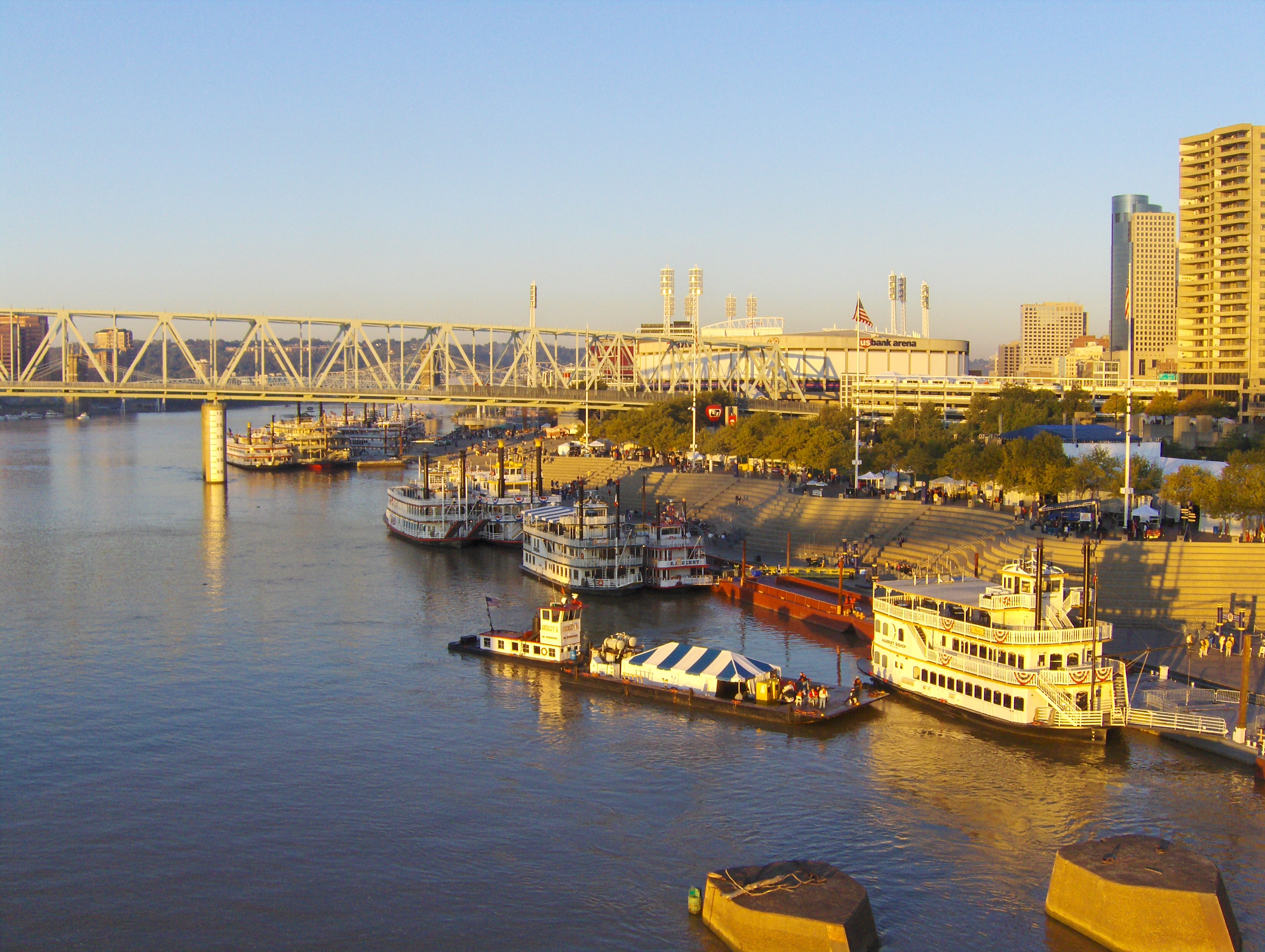
Numerous river boats along the Ohio River during the 2006 festival.

- 2003: The festival took on its most recent formal name and drew a record 900,000 visitors. "Theme cruises" were an added attraction, such as wine tasting cruises, Cincinnati Zoo cruises, and more. Musical acts included Creedence Clearwater Revisited, Lucinda Williams, Emmylou Harris, Shawn Colvin, The Jayhawks, Delbert McClinton, John Hammond, B. B. King, Ricky Skaggs, Mary Chapin Carpenter, and more than 150 other national, regional, and local bands.
- 2006: 17 riverboats took part in the festival, including the Delta Queen, Belle of Louisville, General Jackson, Natchez, Mississippi Queen and Majestic. On the Newport side of the river at the site of the Newport Barracks, a series of American Civil War displays was established, which taught about military life during this period. The US Army Corps of Engineers had displays about the river.
- 2009: The event was cancelled due to lack of sponsorship and has not been held since.

== See also ==
- P.A. Denny (ship)
