= H. K. Bedford =

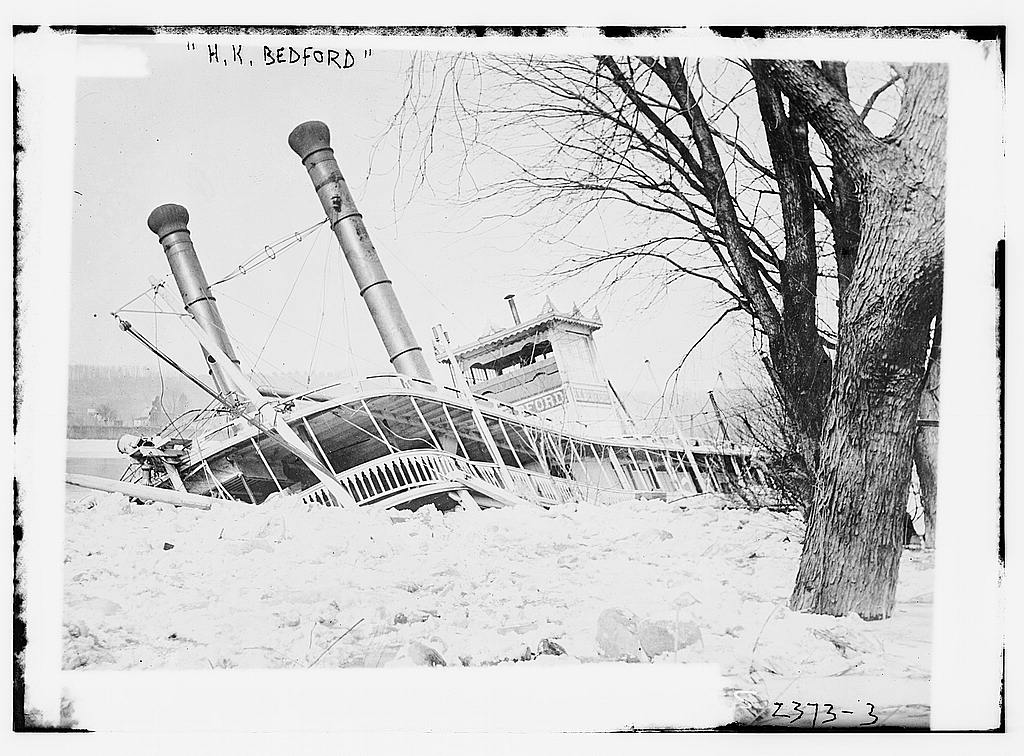
- H. K. Bedford sinking on 29 February 1912.

History
- Name: H.K. Bedford
- Operator: Greene Line
- Builder: Jeffersonville, Indiana
- Launched: 1886
- Acquired: by purchase, 1890
- Fate: Sank, 29 February 1912

General characteristics
- Tonnage: 139 tons
- Length: 149 ft (45 m)
- Beam: 27 ft 3 in (8.31 m)
- Depth: 4 ft 2 in (1.27 m)

The H. K Bedford was a passenger and trade ship of the Greene Line.

It was built in 1886 at Jeffersonville, Indiana, for trade along the Ohio River and upper Cumberland River. In June 1890 she was purchased by Gordon C. Greene. She was caught in an ice floe and sank on February 29, 1912, about 8 miles upstream from Marietta, Ohio.
