= Mary Becker Greene =

Steamship captain

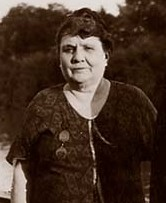
Greene circa 1920

Captain Mary Becker Greene (1867 – April 22, 1949), was steamboat captain of the Greene Line of river steamboats. She was the only female steamboat captain in Ohio.

== Biography ==
She was born in 1867. She married Gordon Christopher Greene in 1890 and they had as their children Thomas Rea Greene, Henry Wilkens Greene, and Christopher Becker Greene. Greene earned her captain's license in 1897.

She died on April 22, 1949, aboard her boat, Delta Queen, after leaving New Orleans. Her spirit is said to still haunt the ship.

In 1988, Greene was inducted into the National Rivers Hall of Fame. Folk musician Jake Speed's "Captain Mary" (2003) was inspired by Greene's life.
