= Christopher Becker Greene =

Captain Christopher Becker Greene (1901 – October 20, 1944) was the head of the Greene Line of steamboats after the death of his father.

== Biography ==
He was born in 1901 in Ohio to Mary Catherine Becker and Gordon Christopher Greene, and his brother was Thomas Rea Greene. In 1928 he raced Frederick Way, Jr. He died on October 20, 1944.
