= Delta Queen =

Historic American paddlewheel steamboat (1927–2008) hotel (2009–2014)

Coordinates: 29.593°N 90.662°W

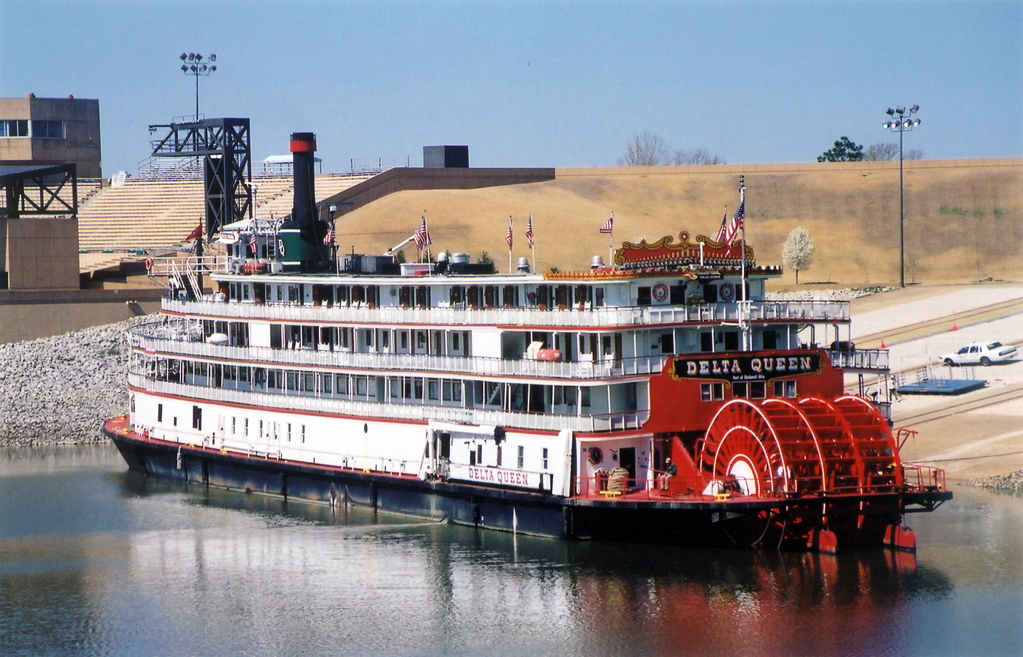
- The Delta Queen in Memphis, Tennessee in May 2003

History

United States
- Name: STR Delta Queen (1927–1941); Delta Queen YHB 7 (1941–1944); Delta Queen YFB 56 (1944–1947); Delta Queen (1947–present)
- Port of registry: Cincinnati, United States
- Ordered: 1924
- Builder: William Denny and Brothers, Dumbarton, Scotland
- In service: 1927
- Out of service: 2008
- Identification: Call sign: WA4141; IMO number: 8643327; MMSI number: 366950730
- Status: planned refurbishment

General characteristics
- Type: Paddle steamer
- Tonnage: 1,650 long tons (1,676 t)
- Length: 285 ft (87 m)
- Beam: 58 ft (18 m)
- Draft: 11 ft 6 in (3.51 m)
- Propulsion: Cross-compound steam engines; 2,000 ihp (1,491 kW); Stern-mounted paddlewheel
- Capacity: 176 passengers
- Delta Queen (river steamboat)
- U.S. National Register of Historic Places
- U.S. National Historic Landmark
- Coordinates: 29.593339350726467, -90.66172983962473
- NRHP reference No.: 70000495

Significant dates
- Added to NRHP: June 15, 1970
- Designated NHL: June 29, 1989

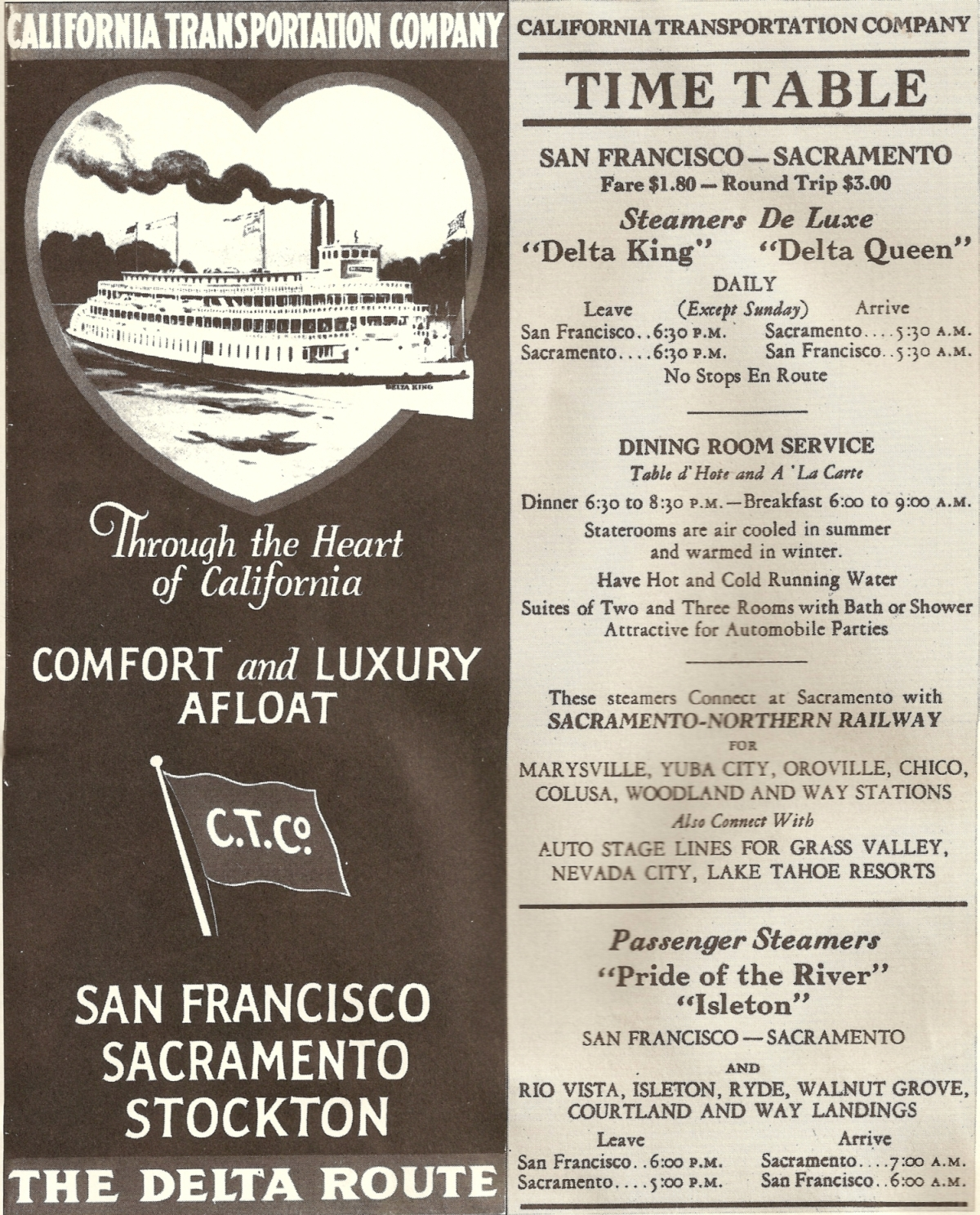
Time table of the Delta Queen and the Delta King in their first season in 1927

Delta Queen is an American sternwheel steamboat. She is known for cruising the major rivers that constitute the tributaries of the Mississippi River, particularly in the American South, although she began service in California on the Sacramento River delta for which she gets her name. She was docked in Chattanooga, Tennessee and served as a floating hotel from 2008 to 2014 when purchased by the newly formed Delta Queen Steamboat Company. She was towed to Houma, Louisiana, in March 2015 for refurbishing to her original condition.

The STR Delta Queen is 285 feet (87 m) long, 58 feet (18 m) wide, and draws 11.5 feet (3.5 m). She weighs 1,650 tons (1,676 metric tons), with a capacity of 176 passengers. Her cross-compound steam engines generate 2,000 indicated horsepower (1,500 kW), powering a stern-mounted paddlewheel. Built in 1927, she is the last surviving steam-powered overnight passenger boat plying the watershed of the Mississippi. In 1989, she was designated a National Historic Landmark. Originally, she was built as an equal to her sister ship, the Delta King, which is moored in Sacramento.

== History ==
The hull, first two decks, and steam engines were ordered in 1924 from the William Denny & Brothers shipyard on the River Leven adjoining the River Clyde at Dumbarton, Scotland. Delta Queen and her sister, Delta King, were shipped in pieces to Stockton, California in 1926. There the California Transportation Company assembled the two vessels for their regular Sacramento River service between San Francisco and Sacramento, and excursions to Stockton, on the San Joaquin River. At the time, they were the most lavishly appointed and expensive sternwheel passenger boats ever commissioned. Driven out of service by a new highway linking Sacramento with San Francisco in 1940, the two vessels were laid up and then purchased by Isbrandtsen Steamship Lines for service out of New Orleans. During World War II, they were requisitioned by the United States Navy for duty in San Francisco Bay as USS Delta Queen (YHB-7/YFB-56). During the war, the vessels were painted battleship gray and used in transporting wounded from ocean-going ships in San Francisco Bay to area hospitals.

Three different United States Presidents have sailed on Delta Queen: Herbert Hoover, Harry Truman, and Jimmy Carter.

In 1946, Delta Queen was purchased by Greene Line of Cincinnati, Ohio and towed via the Panama Canal and the Mississippi and Ohio Rivers for refurbishment in Pittsburgh. On that ocean trip she was piloted by Frederick Way, Jr. In 1948 she entered regular passenger service, plying the waters of the Ohio, Mississippi, Tennessee, and Cumberland Rivers between Cincinnati, New Orleans, St. Paul, Chattanooga, Nashville, and ports in between. Ownership of the vessel has changed seven times over fifty years. Richard Simonton bought a controlling interest in the Greene Line in 1958 when it was in financial difficulty.

In 1966, Congress passed the first Safety at Sea Law that would put the Delta Queen out of business. After consulting with attorney William Kohler, Richard Simonton, Bill Muster, and Edwin "Jay" Quinby traveled to Washington, DC, to save their boat. As chairman of the board of Greene Line Steamers, Jay Quinby testified before the Senate to ask for an exemption to the law. Greene Line had to renegotiate the exemption every two to four years. The boat's Betty Blake Lounge is named in honor of the woman who rose from public relations officer to savior of the boat when Congressman Edward A. Garmatz, a Democrat who represented Baltimore and was Chairman of the House Committee on Merchant Marine and Fisheries, tried to block the 1970 exemption.

Thanks to the efforts of Betty Blake and Bill Muster, the Delta Queen was listed on the National Register of Historic Places in 1970 and was subsequently declared a National Historic Landmark in 1989. The business continued with its name changing in 1973 to The Delta Queen Steamboat Company.

One unusual feature of Delta Queen is her steam calliope, mounted on the Texas deck aft of the pilothouse. It covers approximately three octaves, and was used to play the ship in and out of her berth while she was docking and undocking. The Master of the Delta Queen sometimes extended this courtesy to other vessels as well.

In 1974, Charlie Waller & The Country Gentlemen recorded a song on their Remembrances & Forecasts album written by Leroy Drumm and Pete Goble titled Delta Queen, to which Leroy was inspired to write after having seen her running down the Tennessee River in the early 1970s.

=== 21st century duty ===
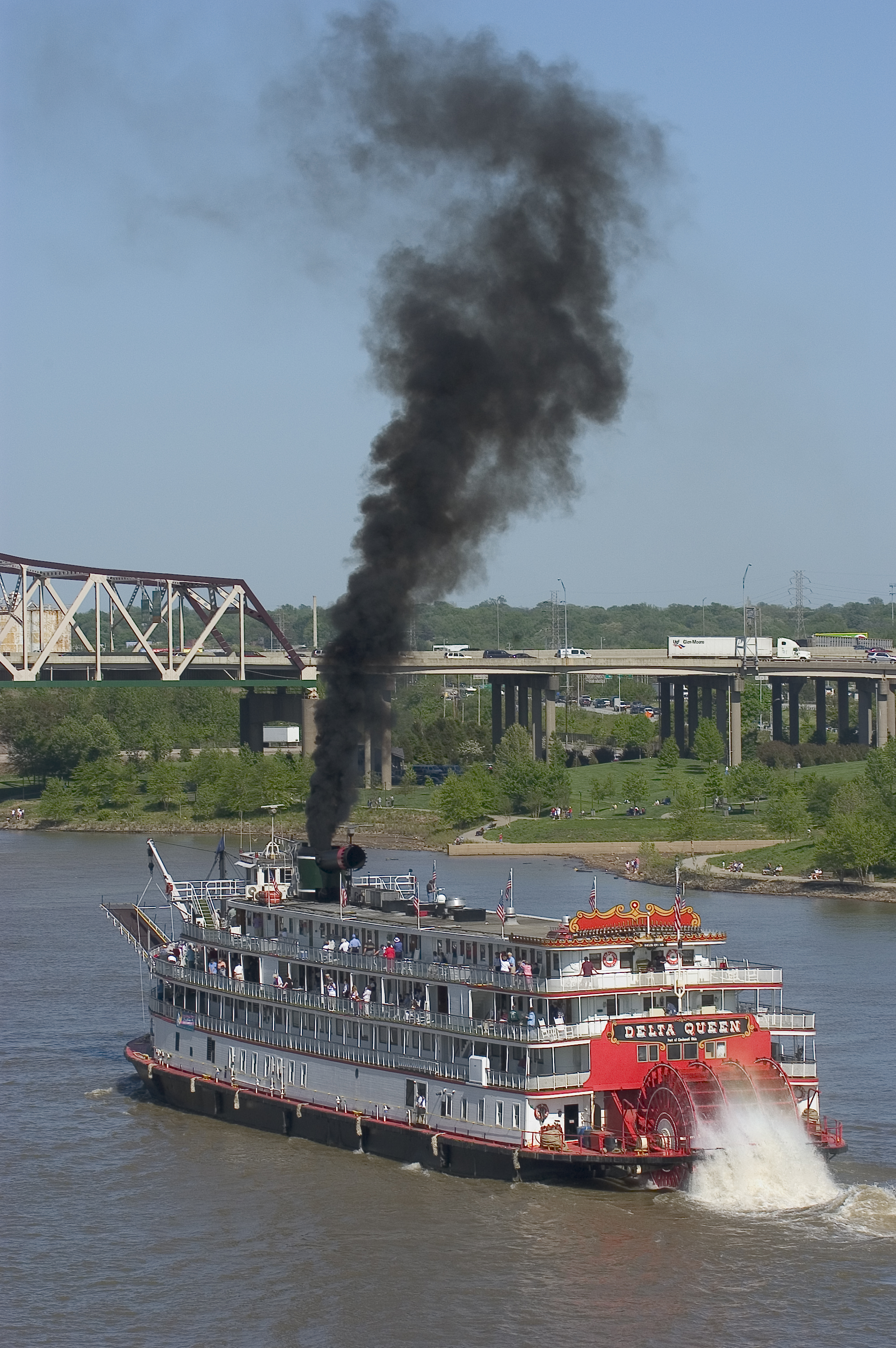
The Delta Queen at the start of the 2004 Great Steamboat Race

Majestic America Line most recently operated the vessel. The vessels were purchased from the Delaware North Companies in April 2006. Besides Delta Queen, the company also owned the American Queen and Mississippi Queen, modern steamboats designed along Delta Queen's lines but carrying around 400 passengers. The company also owned riverboats that have seen service on the Columbia and Snake Rivers in Oregon and Washington, and the Alaska Inside Passage.

Delta Queen cruised the Mississippi River and its tributaries on a regular schedule, with cruises ranging from New Orleans to Memphis to St. Louis to St. Paul to Cincinnati to Pittsburgh, and many more. On some cruises, the vessel probed rivers such as the Arkansas, Red, Tennessee-Tombigbee Waterway, Black Warrior, Mobile, and more.

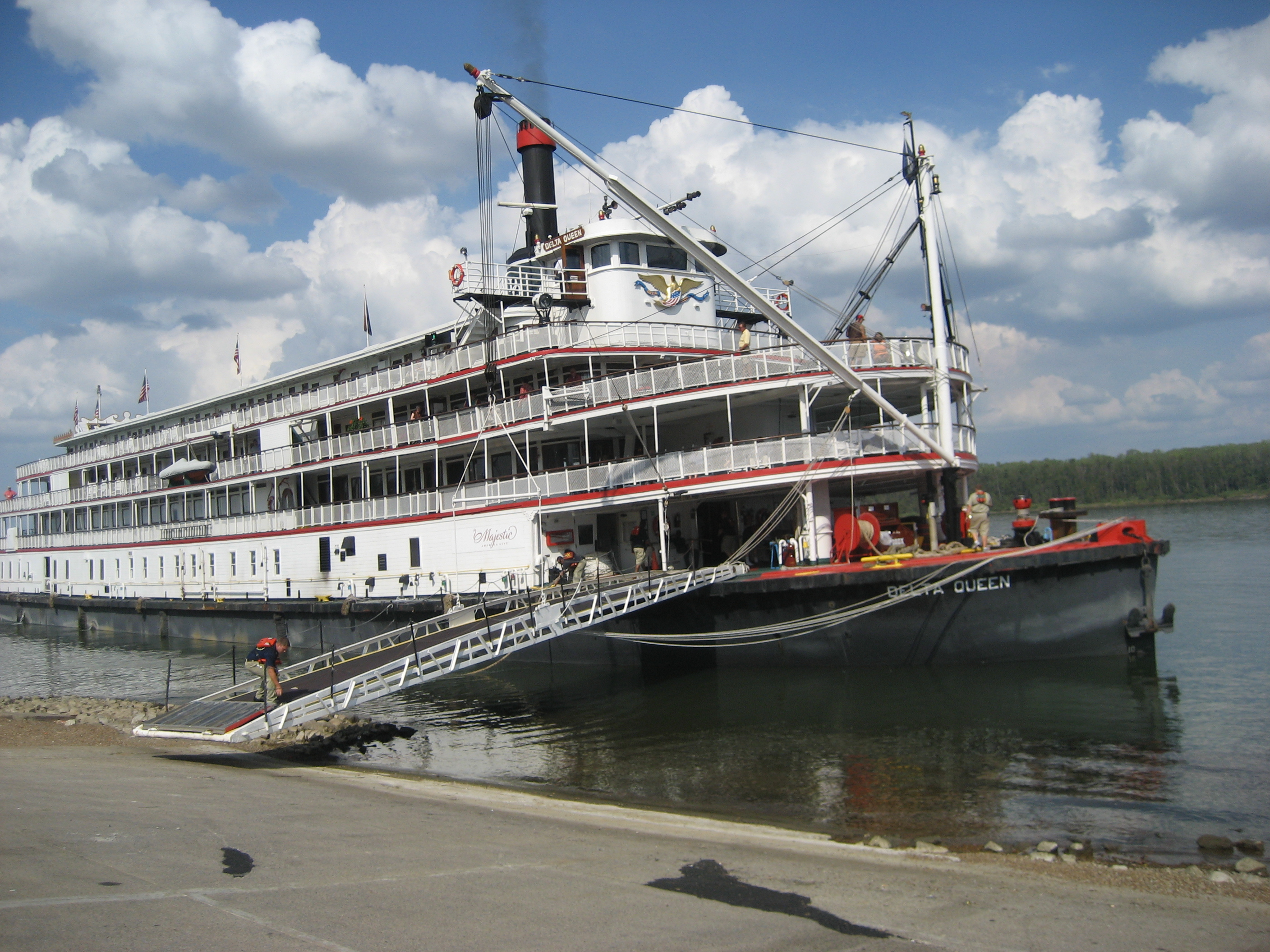
Delta Queen preparing to disembark from Paducah, Kentucky on October 6, 2007.

Delta Queen recreated historic steamboat races each year during the Kentucky Derby Festival, when she raced with the Belle of Louisville on the Ohio at Louisville in the Great Steamboat Race. The winner of the annual race received a trophy of golden antlers, which was mounted on the pilothouse until the next race. They also raced during the Tall Stacks festivals celebrating steamboats, held every three or four years in Cincinnati (Delta Queen's former home port).

On August 1, 2007, Majestic America Line announced that Delta Queen would cease operations permanently at the end of the 2008 season because its most recent exemption from SOLAS, which had been granted to it by Congress nine times over the previous four decades, was expiring. In response, in September 2007, the Member of the Scottish Parliament for Dumbarton, Jackie Baillie, backed by 15 other Members, submitted a motion to the Scottish Parliament calling for the preservation of the ship. Meanwhile, in the United States, devotees of the boat created a renewed "Save the Delta Queen" campaign similar to the one undertaken in the 1970s. However, the efforts were not successful, and the Delta Queen ceased all service at the end of the 2008 season. On her official website, the Majestic America Line announced that it would not operate in 2009, end all operations, and sell all its assets, including its riverboats.

On February 11, 2009, Delta Queen arrived in Chattanooga, Tennessee, to become a floating boutique hotel, as it was feared the vessel could be vandalized if she remained in New Orleans. Under lease to Chattanooga businessman Harry Phillips, she was docked at Coolidge Park Landing on Chattanooga's North Shore. The Delta Queen Hotel officially opened for overnight guests on June 5, 2009, offering dining, a lounge, live period music, and theatrical performances, closing to the public in December 2014.

From 2006 to 2008 Ambassadors International, owned the boat and leased it to a company called All Aboard Travel, operating as Delta Queen LLC, which began leasing the vessel in August 2010. Ambassadors International listed the ship for sale beginning in late 2008 at a price of $4.75 million, and in November 2010 it was announced that a group called Save the Delta Queen 2010 was planning to place a bid to purchase the ship. If it succeeded, the group would place the ship into operation, carrying only 49 people in order to be exempt from federal fire safety regulations, which apply to ships carrying upwards of 50 people.

For a time, with the steamer American Queen turned over to MARAD and Mississippi Queen sold for scrap below New Orleans, Delta Queen was the only steamboat to have been owned by the Delta Queen Steamboat Company (formerly Greene Line Steamers) to remain in service, albeit without running trips. However, as of November 2011, the Great American Steamboat Company of Memphis, Tennessee was booking cruises on American Queen along the Upper and Lower Mississippi River.

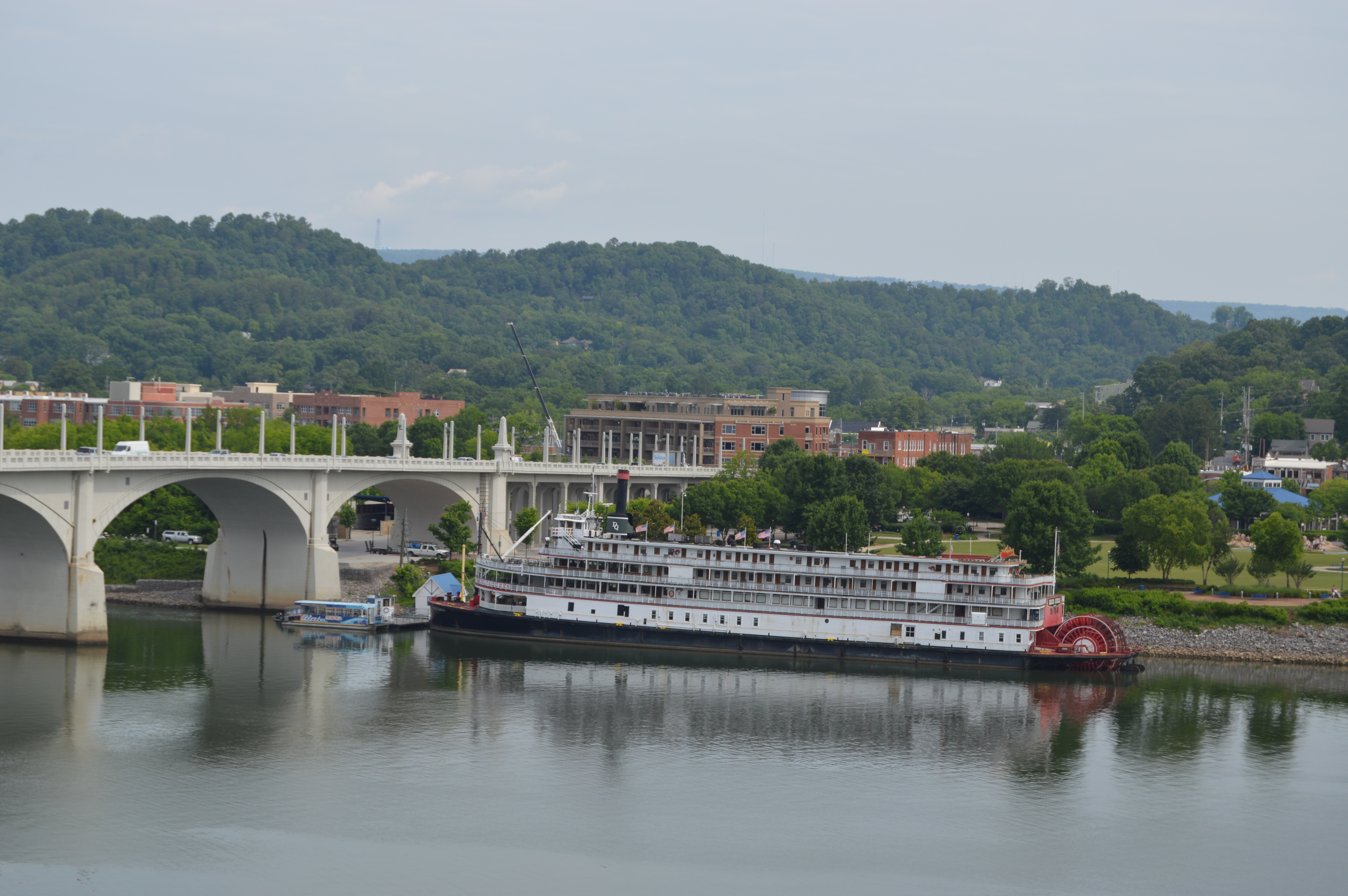
Delta Queen docked in Chattanooga

The mayor of Chattanooga, Andy Berke, put into motion a plan to have the Delta Queen removed from its mooring in Chattanooga, as he considered it an "obstruction". A deadline of September 30, 2013, was given. This dispute seemed to rest on the Delta Queen having not paid its rent, which the owners of the Delta Queen had disputed on their Facebook page.

This news was in light of the Delta Queen being honored as a "National Treasure" by the National Trust for Historic Preservation on September 21, 2013. Congress voted on renewing the Delta Queen's SOLAS exemption to allow it to travel the rivers again in 2013, but the bill failed to pass. The Delta Queen was then bought by the newly formed Delta Queen Steamboat Co. in early 2015. It departed Chattanooga for restoration in New Orleans on March 22, 2015. for repairs and upgrades in Houma, Louisiana. She safely arrived on April 7, 2015, in her temporary slip for restoration.

On November 27, 2018, the U.S. House of Representatives voted to reinstate the exemption to allow the Delta Queen to return to service after a decade-long retirement.

As of 3 January 2024, the Delta Queen is still docked in Houma, with no evidence of work being done.

On June 25, 2025, the official Steamboat Delta Queen Facebook page posted that the Delta Queen was now for sale after running out of funding. They stated that purchase proposals that did not result in dismantling were priority.

== Hauntings ==
Mary Becker Greene, wife of Greene Line founder Gordon C. Greene and a riverboat Captain in her own right, died aboard the boat on April 22, 1949. Guests and employees have reported sounds and activity on board which they attribute to her spirit, particularly around her former quarters. A paranormal investigation of the Delta Queen aired on May 6, 2016, on the Travel Channel’s Ghost Brothers.

== See also ==
- List of ships built by William Denny and Brothers
- Betty Blake
