= Bill Muster =

Photojournalist and marketing executive

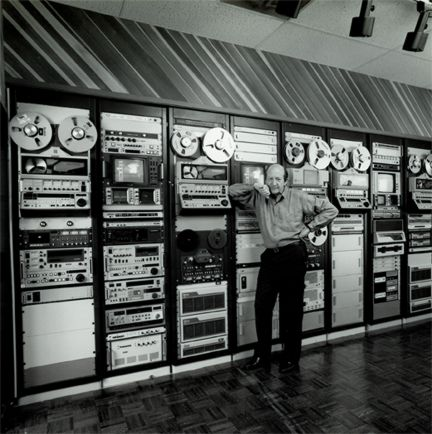
Bill Muster (1926-1989) at his post-production studio in Hollywood, CCI.

William N. Muster (June 18, 1926 to January 3, 1989) was a photographer, publisher, and marketing executive in Los Angeles. He is remembered for his defense of the Delta Queen Steamboat in 1970, and his role in the SATW (Society of American Travel Writers) photo contest.

== Delta Queen and SATW ==
As president of the Delta Queen from 1966 to 1976, he and vice-president Betty Blake worked to secure federal legislation to allow the boat to continue running. They won historic recognition for the boat in 1970.

Bill Muster joined the SATW in 1974 to assist Betty Blake in representing the Delta Queen. Thereafter, he remained an associate member to promote the photo contest. In 1981 the SATW named the contest after him; in 1988 he earned the organization's highest recognition, the Marco Polo Award. The photo contest is known as the Bill Muster Photo Awards.

Muster published his World Traveler’s Almanac with Rand McNally in 1975 (updated in several editions), and a series of travel books under the Traveler's Almanac imprint: America's Top 500 Sights to See, by Larry Meyer and Nancy Meyer (1975); Steamboat Log of the Lower Mississippi, by Bern Keating and Norman Kirk (1976); Travel Adventures in California, by Frank Riley, photos by Bill Muster (1977); 101 Wonders of the Modern World, by Nancy Meyer (1977), and Olympic Adventures in California, by Frank Riley, Elfried Riley, and Bill Muster (WorldWay, 1983).

== Music marketing ==
His career as a marketing executive began at Capitol Records (1953–1959), where he produced the Wrap-Up, a newsletter for the company's salesmen. He was a colleague of marketing executive Don Hassler. After Capitol, he went on to market pre-recorded reel-to-reel tape for Ampex, United Stereo Tapes division. In 1961 he joined Pacific Network, Inc., and California Communications, Inc., as an executive. He and his senior business partner, Richard Simonton, ran their companies out of the 6900 Santa Monica Boulevard building in Hollywood, including a Muzak franchise, the Delta Queen, Travelers Almanac publications, a photo lab and studio, equipment rental businesses, and post-production studios.

== Military experience ==
After joining the Army Air Forces in 1945, Muster served as a publicist, section head, and photo lab chief. He was stationed in Ansbach, Germany, where he photographed the Nuremberg Trials for the military. After the war, he attended the University of Illinois at Champaign-Urbana, on the GI Bill, and earned his degree in journalism in 1950.

== Personal life ==
Bill became an orphan in Chicago during the Great Depression. Although he remained in contact with his half-brother, he never learned of his ancestry. His grandfather John Muster (1830-1887) was a Civl War veteran, a Swiss national who came to America in 1859 and joined the 20th Indiana Volunteer Infantry in 1861. In 1950 Bill Muster married and had two children, Nori and Bill. Following his divorce in 1970, he lived for the rest of his life in his Skylark Lane home in the birdland neighborhood of the Hollywood Hills West, Los Angeles.

== Legacy ==
His legacy, the Bill Muster Foundation, supports photographers, including an award and scholarship for photojournalism at the University of California, Los Angeles.
