= Sons and Daughters of Pioneer Rivermen =

The Sons and Daughters of Pioneer Rivermen, or S&D, is an historical organization operating out of Marietta, OH. According to its website, it "was established in 1939 to perpetuate the memory of pioneer rivermen and for the preservation of river history." Its current president is Jeff Spear. The organization is under the direction of twelve governors, each serving a three-year term, elected by the general voting body.

S&D established the Ohio River Museum in Marietta in 1941. Working under the auspices of the Ohio Historical Society, S&D oversaw the addition of the steam towboat W. P. Snyder Jr. to the museum in 1955, as well as construction of a new museum facility in 1972. In cooperation with the Public Library of Cincinnati and Hamilton County, S&D also established the Inland Rivers Library, a part of the PLCHC's Rare Books and Special Collections department.

S&D publishes a quarterly house organ magazine entitled the S&D Reflector, first created and edited by Capt. Frederick Way, Jr., one of the founders of S&D.
