= Betsy Ann =

Steamboat built in 1899

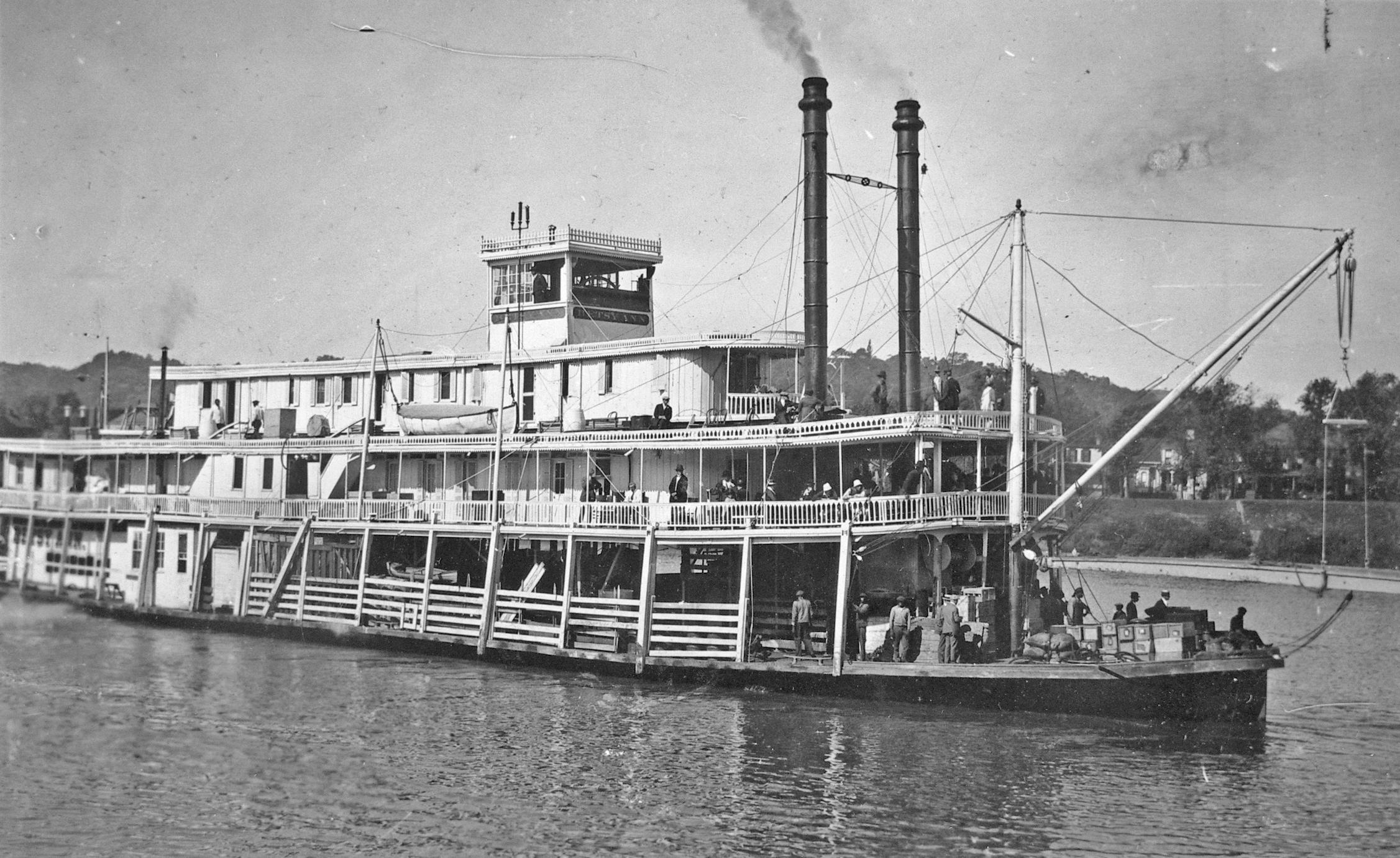

History
- Name: Betsy Ann
- Builder: Iowa Iron Works
- Launched: 1899
- Fate: Dismantled at St. Louis Wharf 1940's turned into a party barge and sank in the Meramec River in Fenton MO. 1952 Remains still in the river.

The Betsy Ann was a sternwheel packet steamer, towboat, and an excursion boat. She was built by Iowa Iron Works in 1899. She is best remembered for participating in three steamboat races. She lasted 41 years, until 1940, when she was dismantled at the St. Louis Wharf. The Betsy Ann was the subject of the book The Log of the Betsy Ann, by Fred Way, a former captain of the boat. She served on the Ohio River, sailing from Pittsburgh, Pennsylvania, to Portsmouth, Ohio.

== Activities ==
- July 24, 1928: Raced with the packet steamer Chris Greene.
- July 16, 1929: Raced again with the packet steamer Tom Greene.
- 1930: Participated in another race, again with the Tom Greene.
