= Delta King =

American paddlewheel steamboat

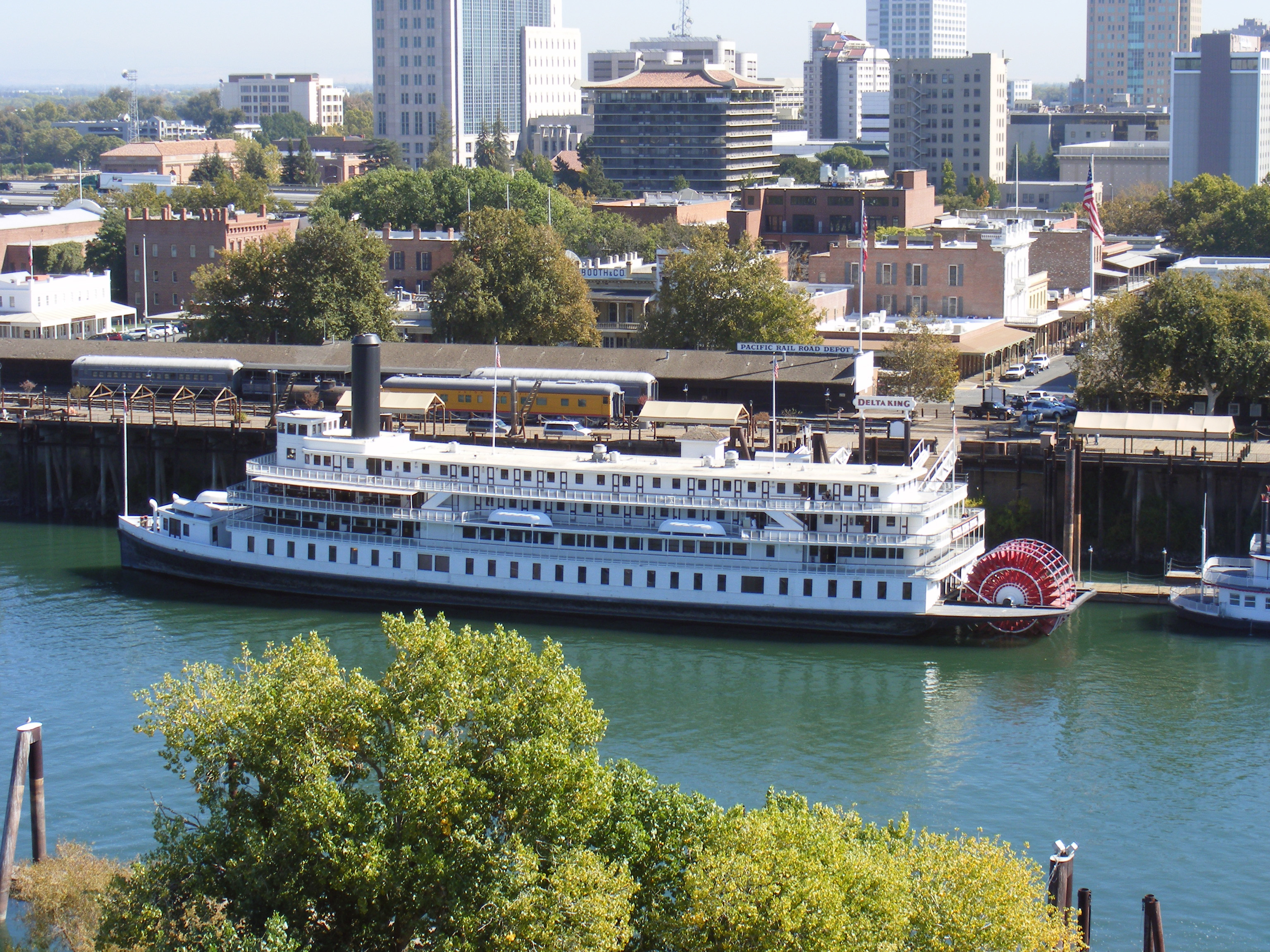
- Delta King moored in Sacramento

History
- Ordered: 1924
- Builder: William Denny & Brothers; California Transportation Company
- Cost: $875,000
- Christened: 20 May 1927

General characteristics
- Tonnage: 1837 (gross)
- Length: 285 ft (87 m)
- Beam: 58 ft (18 m)
- Draft: 11 ft 6 in (3.51 m)
- Installed power: 2,000 hp (1,500 kW) Compound steam
- Propulsion: Sternwheel
- Delta King
- U.S. National Register of Historic Places
- Location within California
- Nearest city: Sacramento, California
- Coordinates: 38°34′58″N 121°30′25″W
- Area: less than one acre
- Built: 1923
- Architect: California Transportation Co.
- NRHP reference No.: 78000797
- Added to NRHP: 31 March 1978

Delta King is a 285-foot-long sternwheel steamboat (87 m) and the sister ship of Delta Queen, built in Glasgow, Scotland and Stockton, California for the California Transportation Company's service between Sacramento and San Francisco, California. She entered service in 1927 and continued until 1940. After wartime service with the United States Navy, Delta King served as an accommodation ship at Kitimat, British Columbia in the 1950s and then returned to California for static use at Old Sacramento where she remains as a hotel, restaurant and venue.

== Design and construction ==
The steel hull, up to the underside of number 2 deck and steam engines was ordered in April 1924 as Yard No.1168 from the William Denny & Brothers shipyard on the River Leven adjoining the River Clyde at Dumbarton, Scotland, and shipped on 8 November that year. The paddle wheel shaft and cranks were supplied by Krupp Stahlwerke AG, Germany. Denny persuaded the owners to adopt the builder's own structure for steel girders, allowing traditional hog chains to be dispensed with. Delta King was shipped in pieces to Stockton, California in November 1924 for assembly and completion by California Transportation at their yard at Banner Island, Stockton.

As designed, the hull of Delta King measured 1,150 GRT, and displaced 1,700 tons. She was 250 feet (76 m) long, 77.1 feet (23.5 m) wide, 11.8 feet (3.6 m) and drew 7.0 feet (2.1 m), though this would have changed when the additional wooden decks and stern-wheel were added. A pair of two-cylinder compound horizontal engines (Denny's Special Order 1090-1091) were designed to produce 1,500ihp, and steering was by four rudders; the stern wheel was constructed of fir, with 28 arms and paddles. At Stockton the upper decks were completed and the ship fitted out. Above a main deck of Siamese ironwood were two further decks constructed from oak, teak, mahogany and cedar. Cabins were opulent and equipped with air conditioning and heating. The lower decks also carried freight and cars.

== History ==
When they entered service in 1927 on California Transportation Company's regular 10-hour Sacramento River service between San Francisco and Sacramento, and on excursions to Stockton on the San Joaquin River, Delta King and Delta Queen were the most lavishly appointed and expensive sternwheel passenger boats ever commissioned. In the 1930s ownership passed to River Lines Inc. Driven out of service by a new highway linking Sacramento with San Francisco in 1940, the two vessels were laid up and then purchased by Isbrandtsen Steamship Lines for service out of New Orleans, though this plan was abandoned when the United States Navy requisitioned the ships.

In November 1940 the two vessels were commissioned by the Navy for duty as a receiving ships for naval reservists in San Francisco Bay as USS Delta King (YHB-6) and USS Delta Queen (YHB-7) respectively. On 5 July 1944 she was redesignated YFB 55 as a naval ferry in the San Francisco area and on 17 April 1946 struck from naval service.

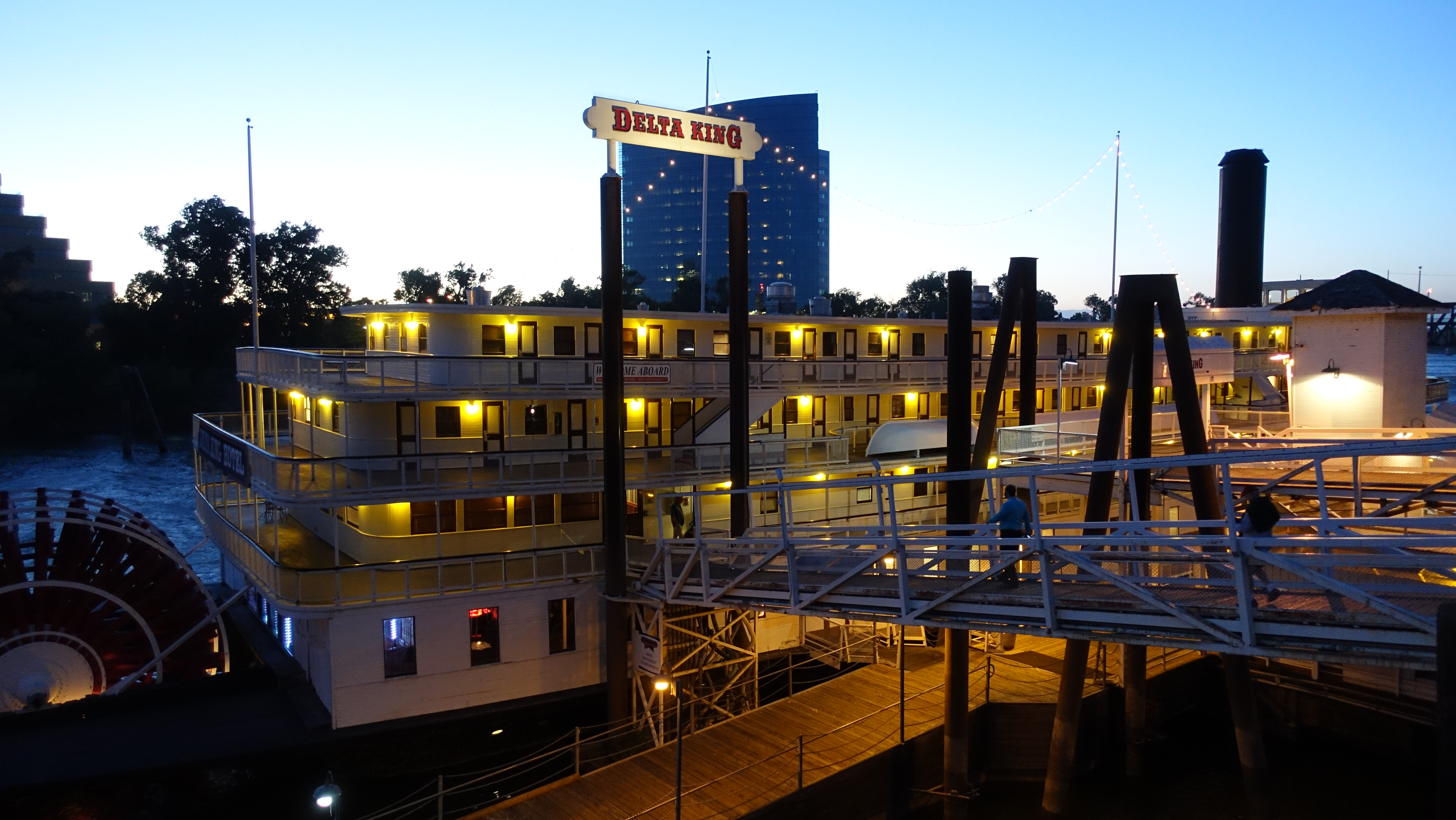
The Delta King Hotel at dusk.

In the 1950s Delta King was towed to serve as home to hundreds of men who were employees of the being constructed ALCAN Aluminum plant and the Kemano Dam power project in the early 1950s in Kitimat on the northern coast of British Columbia. The ship was used as a bunkhouse for the single men as the townsite was literally carved from the wilderness. After changing hands several times, and while owned by Gus Skarakis et al. and berthed near Rio Vista, California, Delta King was listed on the National Register of Historic Places in 1978. By then the engines and paddle wheel had been scrapped and much of the interior stripped.

In 1981 she sank for unknown reasons while laid up in Richmond, California in the San Francisco Bay area. When raised a year later, it was later found the damage was minor, and she was raised and began a five-year restoration costing $9 million. Returned to Sacramento, she was re-opened on 20 May 1989.

== Current uses ==
Today, Delta King is permanently moored in Sacramento, California, and is home to a 44-room hotel, award-winning restaurant and Capital Stage, a resident professional theater company. "Delta Kings" and "Delta Queens" are the mascots of Stagg High School in Stockton, California.

== See also ==
- List of ships built by William Denny and Brothers
