= Blanche Douglass Leathers =

American steamboat captain

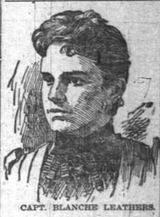
Captain Blanch Douglass Leathers, drawing appearing in the Indianapolis News on 23 February 1895.

Blanche Douglass Leathers (1860 - January 26, 1940) was the first woman master and a steamboat captain on the Mississippi River in the late 19th and early 20th centuries. Her nicknames include "little captain," the "angel of the Mississippi" and the "lady skipper."

== Biography ==
Leathers was born in Tensas Parish, Louisiana and her father was a cotton planter. She married Captain Bowling S. Leathers in 1880 and had her honeymoon on his boat. Her husband taught her how to pilot and navigate the river.

Leathers earned her master's license in 1894. Then Leathers began her historic voyage as the first woman steamboat captain on the Mississippi. As the Natchez steamed away from New Orleans, tugs, ferries and freighters whistled in salute. Newspaper reporters interviewed her and she gave out autographs. She would make regular trips from New Orleans to Vicksburg and was the only woman captain of a large Mississippi river packet. Leathers said that she often managed the employees, performed boat inspections and then took over as captain when her husband needed. In 1896, the Public Ledger wrote that Leathers had taken command of the Natchez. She worked on the river for 18 years and then retired in New Orleans after the death of her husband. In 1929, she came out of retirement and started piloting a steamboat, the Tennessee Belle. The last time she renewed her pilot's license was in 1935.

Leathers died in New Orleans on January 26, 1940 of a cerebral hemorrhage at the age of 79. A children's book, Steamboat! The Story of Captain Blanche Leathers was published in 1999 by Judith Heide Gilliland and illustrated by Holly Meade. In 2009, Leathers was inducted into the National Rivers Hall of Fame.
