= Don Hassler =

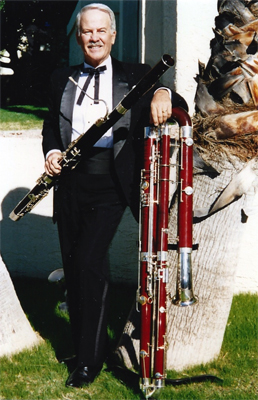

Background information
- Born: Donald E. Hassler
- Origin: American
- Died: August 20, 2013 (aged 84) Mesa, Arizona
- Genres: Jazz, swing
- Occupation(s): Composer, musician, A&R representative
- Instrument(s): Saxophone, bassoon

Don Hassler (June 6, 1929 – August 20, 2013) was an American composer, musician, and A&R representative. He is known for his membership and performances in jazz bands and symphonic orchestras, in which he played the saxophone and bassoon. He also served in military bands for seventeen years, including as the commander of the 63rd Infantry Division Band.

== Personal background ==
Don Hassler was born on June 6, 1929. He studied and played music throughout his early education, starting in the fifth grade. He attended Northwestern University, earning a Bachelor's degree in music theory in 1950. When he was 71, he earned a Master's degree in musical performance from Arizona State University. He was married twice and has three children from his first marriage.

== Professional background ==
=== Military ===
In 1948, Hassler joined the Illinois National Guard 33rd Division in Chicago. He became master sergeant (E-7) and associate conductor in 1952, then warrant officer and bandmaster. After moving to Harvey, Illinois in 1953, he transferred to the 33rd Division Tank Company and became the unit administrator. In 1955, he moved to Los Angeles and transferred to the Army Reserve 63rd Division. He became chief warrant officer, bandmaster, conductor, and finally commander of the 63rd Infantry Division Band. While he was in command, they recorded a transcription disk of military marches for Armed Forces Radio at the Western Avenue headquarters. He was promoted to first lieutenant, AG Corps, and assigned to division headquarters as captain. In 1962, he left the Army Reserve band and transferred to the 205th Public Information Army Overseas Radio Station, part of the Sixth United States Army. He was the band leader until his resignation in 1965. He served 17 years in the National Guard and Army Reserves as a musician.

=== Music ===
Following his graduation from Northwestern, Hassler joined the staff of WMAQ radio in Chicago, where he worked as a record librarian and program builder. He then went to work for Capitol Records as a salesman out of the Chicago Capitol Branch. During this time, he promoted the Bozo the Clown series for children, and brought Bozo to radio stations and promotional events all over his territory of downstate Illinois.

In 1955, Capitol transferred him to Los Angeles, where he was a promotions manager and sales executive, as well as an A&R representative. He worked directly with Stan Kenton Presents, a series of albums to showcase individuals from Kenton's orchestra. He also worked with Bill Muster on marketing and promotional projects. When the Capitol Tower opened in 1956, Hassler was a tour guide on opening day and worked out of his office in the Tower until he left the company in 1961.

In the 1960s, Hassler worked in the electronics and music business until retirement, including Transistronics (transistorized amplifiers and tuners), Earl Madman Muntz (car stereo and TVs), and Concord Electronics (reel-to-reel tape players). In the 1970s and 1980s, he established and oversaw the operations of home electronics stores in the Phoenix area.

In the late 1980s, he wrote arrangements for band and orchestra music and performed in various swing and jazz bands, as well as symphonic orchestras. He played bassoon in the Tempe Symphony Orchestra and Tempe Wind Ensemble, performing at the Tempe Center for the Arts. He also played saxophone in local jazz bands, including Bergie Crandall and his Let's Dance Band, Myron Sommerfeld and his Music of the Stars Orchestra, and the Jump Jive n' Wailers Swing Band.

== Board memberships ==
- 1956: Hollywood Jaycees (Junior Chamber of Commerce) – Member
- 1958–59: Hollywood Jaycees (Junior Chamber of Commerce) – President
