= Leroy Drumm =

American songwriter (1936 – 2010)

Leroy Maxey Drumm (September 26, 1936 – November 26, 2010) was an American bluegrass and country songwriter whose work became part of the recorded repertoire of several prominent artists in the genre. He is best known as co-writer of "Colleen Malone," recorded by Hot Rize, which won the International Bluegrass Music Association (IBMA) Song of the Year award in 1991.

Drumm was part of the songwriting partnership of Pete Goble and Leroy Drumm, which was profiled in Bluegrass Unlimited in 1988 for its contributions to the bluegrass repertoire.

== Early life and military service ==
Drumm was born in Algonac, Michigan. He served in the United States Navy and later worked as a welder while continuing to write songs.

== Songwriting career ==
Drumm began writing songs in the early 1950s. His best-known composition, "Colleen Malone," was co-written with Pete Goble and recorded by Hot Rize on the album Take It Home, where it later received the IBMA Song of the Year award in 1991.

Throughout the 1970s and later decades, his songs were recorded by artists including the Country Gentlemen, Larry Sparks, Doyle Lawson & Quicksilver, Russell Moore & IIIrd Tyme Out, the Bluegrass Cardinals, Bill Emerson, and others.

Drumm’s songwriting output included more than 400 registered works documented in the BMI repertoire database, reflecting a sustained professional writing career spanning multiple decades.

== Death ==
Drumm died on November 26, 2010, at his home in Waynesboro, Tennessee.

== Selected compositions recorded by other artists ==
=== The Country Gentlemen ===
- "Delta Queen"
- "Willow Creek Dam"
- "Billy McGee the Drummer Boy"
- "Circuit Rider"
- "Joe's Last Train"

=== Larry Sparks ===
- "Blue Virginia Blues"
- "Halfway to Tulsa"
- "Getting Over You"
- "Tennessee 1949"

=== Doyle Lawson & Quicksilver ===
- "God Sent an Angel"
- "Georgia Girl"
- "Poet With Wings"

=== Russell Moore & IIIrd Tyme Out ===
- "Moundsville Pen"
- "Phone Call Away"

== Awards and recognition ==
- 1991 – IBMA Song of the Year, "Colleen Malone" (co-written with Pete Goble; recorded by Hot Rize)
- 2014 – IBMA Gospel Recorded Performance of the Year nomination, "The Day We Learn to Fly" (co-written with Stacy Richardson; recorded by Volume Five)
