= The Kentuckian (painting) =

1954 painting by Thomas Hart Benton

- Artist: Thomas Hart Benton
- Year: 1954
- Medium: Oil on canvas
- Dimensions: 193.4 cm × 153.4 cm (76 1/8 in × 60 6/16 in)
- Location: Los Angeles County Museum of Art; Los Angeles

The Kentuckian is a 1954 painting by American artist Thomas Hart Benton. It is based on a scene from the film The Kentuckian, where the backwoodsman Big Eli Wakefield (played by Burt Lancaster) and his son Little Eli (played by Donald MacDonald) encounter a frontier village. The painting belongs to the Los Angeles County Museum of Art.

== Creation ==
The painting was commissioned by the film studio Norma Productions to help promote the film The Kentuckian, directed by and starring Burt Lancaster. Both Lancaster and the producer Harold Hecht were admirers of Benton and took the initiative for the commission. Among Benton's sketches for the painting is one version where the characters are drawn as cube-figures.

== Provenance ==
The painting was exhibited at the film's premiere in Washington, DC. It was later used on the label of a brand of whiskey. The painting belonged to Lancaster and was not exhibited in public again until he gave it to the Los Angeles County Museum of Art in 1978. As of 2017, it is not on public view at the museum.
