= General Jackson (riverboat) =

1985 riverboat

Coordinates: 36.2038°N 86.6952°W

- General Jackson preparing for Tall Stacks in Cincinnati, OH (2006)

History
- Namesake: Previous river boat General Jackson
- Owner: Ryman Hospitality Properties
- Operator: Marriott International
- Route: Cumberland River
- Builder: Jeffboat, Jeffersonville, Indiana
- Launched: 20 April 1985
- Christened: 2 July 1985
- Identification: MMSI number: 366979270; Callsign: WDH2361

General characteristics
- Type: Showboat
- Tonnage: 1,489 DWT
- Length: 274 ft (84 m); 300 ft (91 m) with gangway
- Beam: 63 ft 6 in (19.35 m)
- Height: 77 ft (23 m) to top of stacks
- Draft: 7 ft (2.1 m)
- Installed power: 2 × Caterpillar 3512 diesel engines
- Propulsion: 2 × 600 horsepower (450 kW) electric motors; 36 ft-long (11 m), 24 ft-dia. (7.3 m) Paddlewheel
- Speed: 13 miles per hour (21 km/h; 11 kn)
- Capacity: 1200 passengers
- Crew: 157

General Jackson is a riverboat—more specifically, a showboat—based on the Cumberland River in Nashville, Tennessee.

General Jackson was named after another riverboat of the same name that was built in 1817; that boat was in turn named for Andrew Jackson. The modern boat was originally an attraction at the Opryland USA theme park. The park closed in 1997, but the boat remains in service, docking at Pennington Bend near the Opry Mills shopping center that replaced the park. In addition to Opry Mills, the dock is located near the Grand Ole Opry House and the Gaylord Opryland Resort & Convention Center.

The original captains were Captain E.A. Poe and Captain William Howell.

== Specifications ==
General Jackson was built by Jeffboat in Jeffersonville, Indiana and launched in 1985. Though built to resemble a vintage steam-powered riverboat, it is actually powered by diesel generators which power two 600 horsepower (450 kW) electric motors, which in turn propel a 24-foot-diameter (7.3 m), 36-ton sternwheel. The boat has a capacity of 1,200 passengers and 157 crew members. She is 274 feet (84 m) long (300 feet (91 m) with gangway extended), has a 63-foot-6-inch (19.35 m) beam (width), is 77 feet (23 m) tall with her folding smokestacks fully extended (the folding stacks are necessary because of low bridge clearances), and has a draft of 7 feet (2.1 m).

== Shows ==
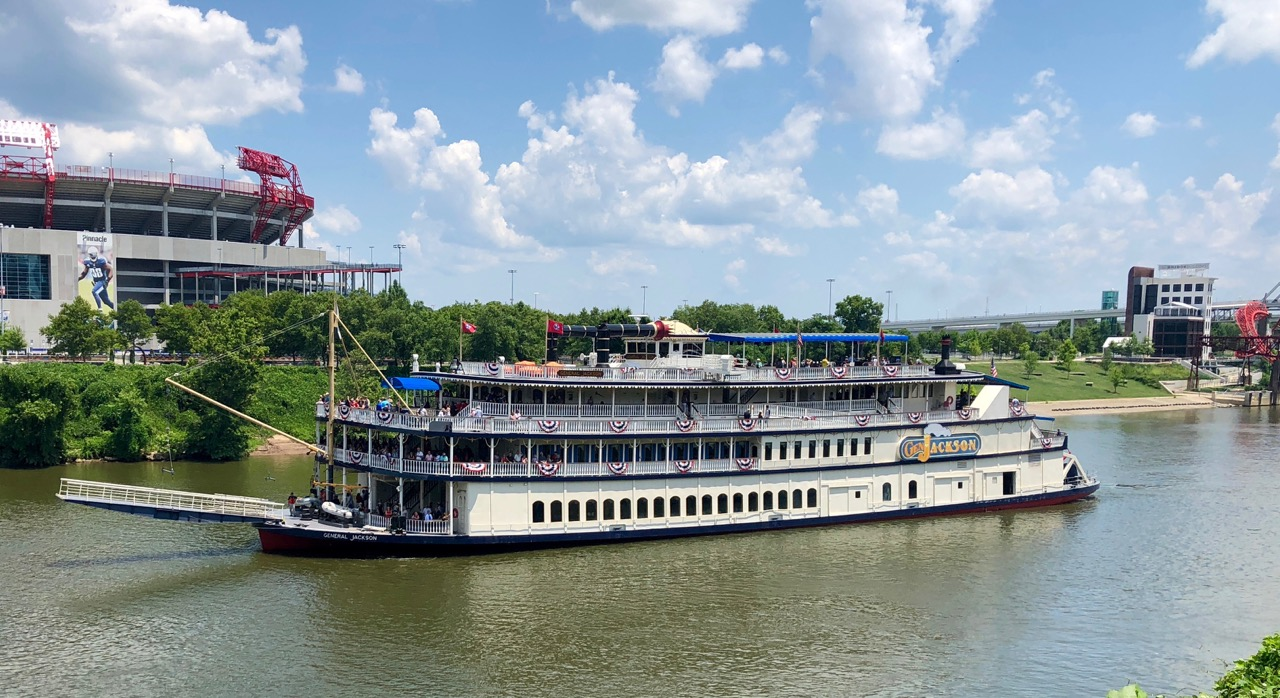
General Jackson at Nashville, 4 July 2018

General Jackson is designed to recreate the showboats that plied the waters of American rivers in the 19th century. Several different shows are presented during the primary March–December season, with two cruises usually taken each day. Evening cruises normally feature dining as well. Most cruises feature the country music for which the Opry is known, though variety musicals and gospel music are also featured.

The boat occasionally ventures from its home port of Nashville. In October 2006, General Jackson took part in the Tall Stacks riverboat heritage festival in Cincinnati, Ohio.
