= Mississippi Queen (steamboat) =

Steamboat launched in 1976

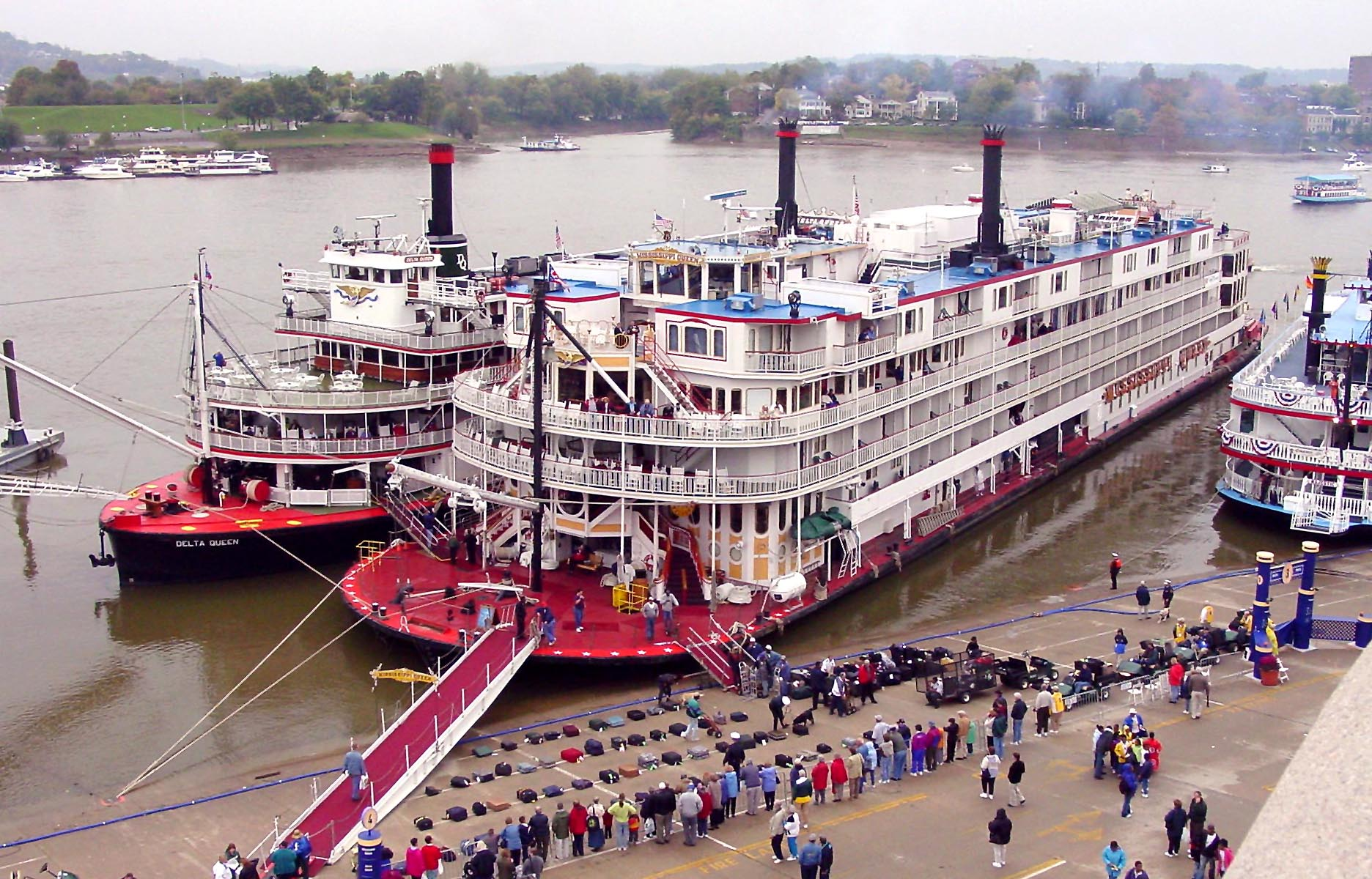
- Mississippi Queen (center), with the Delta Queen along her starboard side, moored at the Tall Stacks Festival in Cincinnati, Ohio in October 2003. The Majestic appears on the right.

History
- Name: Mississippi Queen
- Owner: Majestic America Line
- Operator: Majestic America Line
- Port of registry: New Orleans
- Yard number: 2999
- Laid down: 1973
- Completed: 1975
- In service: 1976
- Out of service: 2008
- Identification: Call sign: WBB5793; IMO number: 8643066; MMSI number: 366950750
- Fate: Scrapped in 2011

General characteristics
- Class & type: Steamboat
- Length: 116 meters (382 ft)

The Mississippi Queen was the second-largest paddle wheel driven river steamboat ever built, second only to the larger American Queen. The ship was the largest such steamboat when she was completed in 1976 by the Delta Queen Steamboat Company at Jeffboat in Indiana and was a seven-deck recreation of a classic Mississippi riverboat. Mississippi Queen was commissioned by a charter airline, Overseas National Airways (ONA), which owned the Delta Queen at the time. Construction, which started in 1973, was overseen by the brother of the ONA CEO. However, by the time of the first voyage in 1976, the Delta Queen Steamboat Company had been sold to the Coca-Cola Bottling Company of New York. She was later owned by the Majestic America Line.

The Mississippi Queen had 206 state rooms for a capacity of 412 guests and a crew of 157. It was 116 meters (382 ft) long, 21 meters (68 ft) wide, and displaced 3,709 metric tonnes (3,364 tons). Her original port of registry was Cincinnati, Ohio, home to the Delta Queen Steamboat Company. The company relocated its main office to #30 Robin Street Wharf in New Orleans in the late 1980s, and this became the new homeport to its vessels. The location was the only port where passengers had a dedicated check-in lounge experience. They enjoyed live music, photo opportunities with a Mark Twain impersonator and young ladies in antebellum dresses, and even the opportunity to watch fresh pralines being made (followed by still-warm samples) while awaiting the embarkation process to begin.

The Mississippi Queen was a genuine stern paddlewheeler with a wheel that measured 6.7 meters (22 ft) in diameter by 11 meters (36 ft) wide and weighed 77 metric tonnes (70 tons). The steamboat also featured a 44 whistle steam calliope, which was the largest on the Mississippi River system. The original call sign was WYH6868. Most crew members belonged to the Seafarers International Union (SIU) while salaried hotel staff were employees of DQSC. The boat had an annual month-long lay-up in January during which time repairs, refurbishments and renovations were completed.

The Mississippi Queen was laid up in New Orleans at Perry Street Wharf after being gutted, initially for renovation. Instead, however, the steamboat was sold for scrap in May 2009. She was towed for the last time to Morgan City, Louisiana, in March 2011 to be cut down.

== In popular culture ==
A steamboat called the Mississippi Queen was used in the 1982 episode "Cap'n Spanky's Showboat" in the animated television series The Little Rascals.

The song 'Evangeline' written by Robbie Robertson & performed by The Band and Emmylou Harris references the boat - "Evangeline, Evangeline, curses the soul of the Mississippi Queen"

== See also ==
- Delta Queen
- American Queen
