= The Kentuckian (1955 film) =

1955 film by Burt Lancaster

- Theatrical release poster
- Directed by: Burt Lancaster
- Written by: A.B. Guthrie Jr.
- Based on: The Gabriel Horn by Felix Holt
- Produced by: Harold Hecht
- Starring: Burt Lancaster; Dianne Foster; Diana Lynn; Walter Matthau
- Cinematography: Ernest Laszlo
- Edited by: George E. Luckenbacher
- Music by: Bernard Herrmann
- Color process: Technicolor
- Production companies: Hecht-Lancaster Productions; James Productions
- Distributed by: United Artists
- Release date: August 10, 1955
- Running time: 104 minutes
- Country: United States
- Language: English
- Box office: $2.6 million (US)

The Kentuckian is a 1955 American CinemaScope Western film directed by Burt Lancaster, who also stars. This is one of only two films that Lancaster directed (the other was The Midnight Man), and the only one for which he has sole credit. It is Walter Matthau's film debut. The film is an adaptation of the novel The Gabriel Horn by Felix Holt. The film was shot in locations around Kentucky, including Cumberland Falls, the Levi Jackson Wilderness Road State Park near London, Owensboro and Green River, and at the Abraham Lincoln Memorial Village near Rockport, Indiana. A featured landmark is the natural arch Sky Bridge .

== Plot ==
Frontiersman Elias "Big Eli" Wakefield decides to leave 1820s Kentucky to move to Texas with his son "Little Eli". They find a town where they have the same last name as a family suspected of murder. After a struggle, Big Eli is arrested and put in jail. Little Eli is minded by a woman named Hannah, an indentured servant.

Two members of another family are feuding with the Wakefields and think that Eli is part of that. They meet the sheriff, who is prepared to give Eli to them, but Hannah steals the jail key and frees Eli. Big Eli and Little Eli leave town and take her with them. The sheriff finds them, so they use some of the money that they need to go to Texas to free her.

They arrive in town to find Big Eli's brother Zack. He encounters Stan Bodine, who is an expert with a whip, and he tells Eli where to find him. Eli is warmly greeted by his brother, but Zack's wife Sophie looks down on Hannah because she is a servant. Zack wants Eli to stay with him, so he plans to have Eli work for him while never saving enough to reach Texas.

While mussel fishing, Little Eli finds a large pearl. In town, Big and Little Eli listen to Ziby Fletcher, a showman making a sales pitch. Big Eli meets Ziby in the bar and describes the pearl found by "a friend". Ziby advises him that President James Monroe loves freshwater pearls.

Eli meets Susie, the local schoolteacher, and they enjoy the evening with Zack and Sophie. Hannah sees them together and quickly leaves, which upsets Little Eli. Big Eli finishes writing the letter to the president, offering to sell him the pearl. The bar patrons laugh at Big Eli for thinking that the pearl was worth anything. Zack enters and tells his brother to leave the bar.

The school children tease Little Eli about the pearl, but Susie stops the teasing. Zack teaches his brother about tobacco. The Texas steamboat arrives to pick up tobacco, and the townsfolk are allowed to tour the boat. Little Eli apologizes to Susie for leaving the class, and she tells Big Eli that he should be proud of his son for not backing down from the other children.

When Eli takes his son hunting, Hannah hears their dog and meets them at the fire. Eli deduces that she has indentured herself again to give him his Texas money, but he tells her to get the paper back and free herself.

Big Eli realizes that he forgot about dinner with Susie, but she forgives him when he arrives apologetically late. He receives a reply from the president, but the letter advises him that the pearl has no value. Zack suggests that Eli ride the riverboat and complete the sale of the tobacco. He gambles at the roulette wheel and wins, so he plans to tell everyone that he got the money from the president for his pearl. The gamblers will not let him leave the boat, so and he and Little Eli jump off the boat with their dog and Zack's money.

Big Eli and Zack appear at the bar, and it is clear the others now respect Eli. At a town party, Bodine encourages one of the children to fight with Little Eli. The boy, Luke, picks up a whip and attacks Little Eli, after which Bodine attacks Big Eli with his whip. He is beating Eli until Hannah traps the whip under the wagon wheel. Eli defeats Bodine easily without his whip. Pleasant Tuesday Babson sees this and says that he is a man who Texas needs.

Big Eli tells Little Eli that he is marrying Susie and that they are not going to Texas. Eli explains that he has promised his brother that he will learn the business. He tells his son to bury the horn used for calling the dog so that they will never find it. He does, but then digs it up. Susie tells Big Eli that Hannah helped him fight Bodine. Eli hears his son blow the horn, which the dog also hears and breaks the rope, freeing himself to run to Little Eli. Little Eli goes to see Hannah, but Bodine is there with the two feuding brothers. They grab him and wait for his father.

Big Eli is approached by Babson, who wants him for Texas, so Eli looks for his son. Bodine refuses to join the brothers in killing Eli and the Texan. The brothers kill him and shoot Babson, but Hannah shoots one of them. Eli runs toward the other brother before he can load his gun, and reaches him in time. He kills him with the butt of the rifle. Eli tells Little Eli that they are going to Texas and invites Hannah to join them. She accepts.

== Cast ==
- Burt Lancaster as Elias Wakefield
- Dianne Foster as Hannah Bolen
- Diana Lynn as Susie Spann
- John McIntire as Zack Wakefield
- Una Merkel as Sophie Wakefield
- John Carradine as Ziby Fletcher
- John Litel as Pleasant Tuesday Babson
- Rhys Williams as Constable
- Edward Norris as Roulette Dealer
- Walter Matthau as Stan Bodine
- Donald MacDonald as Little Eli Wakefield
- Lisa Ferraday as Gambler

== Production ==
Near the end of the film, a ferocious fight occurs between Lancaster's character and Matthau's whip-wielding antagonist. Matthau was doubled by whip expert Whip Wilson, who cut Lancaster across the shoulder after the star asked him to "hit me and make it look real". Lancaster had also taken a real whipping during the filming of Norma Productions's first film Kiss the Blood Off My Hands in 1948.

The film features an appearance by the famed sternwheel riverboat Gordon C. Greene, the same steamboat used in Gone with the Wind and Steamboat Round the Bend.

== Release ==
As part of the publicity, producers Hecht and Lancaster commissioned Thomas Hart Benton to create the painting The Kentuckian, which depicts a scene from the film. The painting belonged to the Hecht family for years, but was ultimately donated to the Los Angeles County Museum of Art in 1978.
