= Gordon C. Greene =

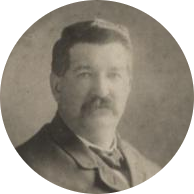
Greene circa 1910

Captain Gordon Christopher Greene (September 8, 1862 – January 20, 1927), was the owner of the Greene Line of river steamboats.

== Biography ==
He was born on September 8, 1862, in Newport, Ohio. In 1890 he started the Greene Line of river steamboats with Henry K. Bedford. He married Mary Catherine Becker in 1890 and had three sons, Christopher Becker Greene, Henry Wilkins Greene, and Thomas Rea Greene. The Gordon C. Greene ship was built in 1923.

He died on January 20, 1927, in Hyde Park, Cincinnati in Ohio. He was buried in Newport Cemetery in Ohio. After his death, his widow Mary served as company head and became one of the only women pilots on the river.
