= Delta Queen Steamboat Company =

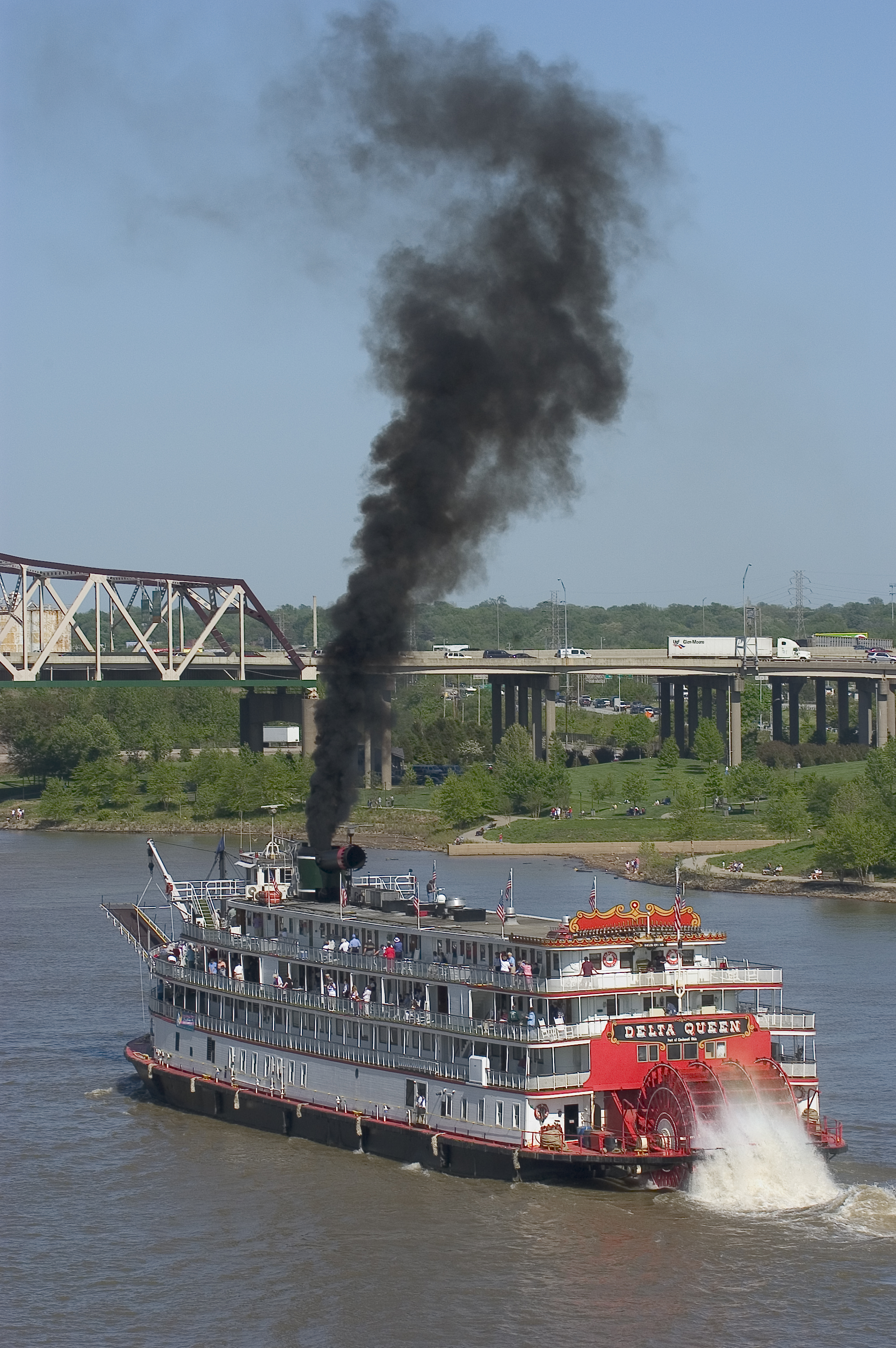
The Delta Queen at the start of the 2004 Great Steamboat Race

The Greene Line was a line of river steamships along the Ohio River. The name was changed in 1973 to Delta Queen Steamboat Company.

== History ==
The company was started in 1890 by Gordon C. Greene with Henry K. Bedford. When Gordon died in 1927 his sons: Christopher Becker Greene, Henry Wilkins Greene, and Thomas R. Greene ran the company. In 1969, a charter airline, Overseas National Airways (ONA) bought the company and changed its name in 1973 to "Delta Queen Steamboat Company". ONA commissioned the construction of the Mississippi Queen, but by the time the new ship first sailed in 1976, ONA had sold the company to the Coca-Cola Bottling Company of New York.

== Ships ==
- H. K. Bedford (1886) was built in 1886 and purchased from the previous owner in 1890 and named after Henry K. Bedford.
- Gordon C. Greene (steamboat) (1923) named after Gordon C. Greene
- Thomas Greene (steamboat) (1925) named after Thomas R. Greene.
- Delta Queen (1924) was built in 1924 and purchased from the previous owner in 1946
- Mississippi Queen (steamboat) Built in the 1970s, and is not currently cruising, because it is being stripped, it also has the largest calliope to be put on a steamboat.
- American Queen Built in 1994, the largest Steamboat that works, now the flag ship for the American Queen Steamboat Company.
