= Frederick Way Jr. =

American steamboat captain

Way in 1975

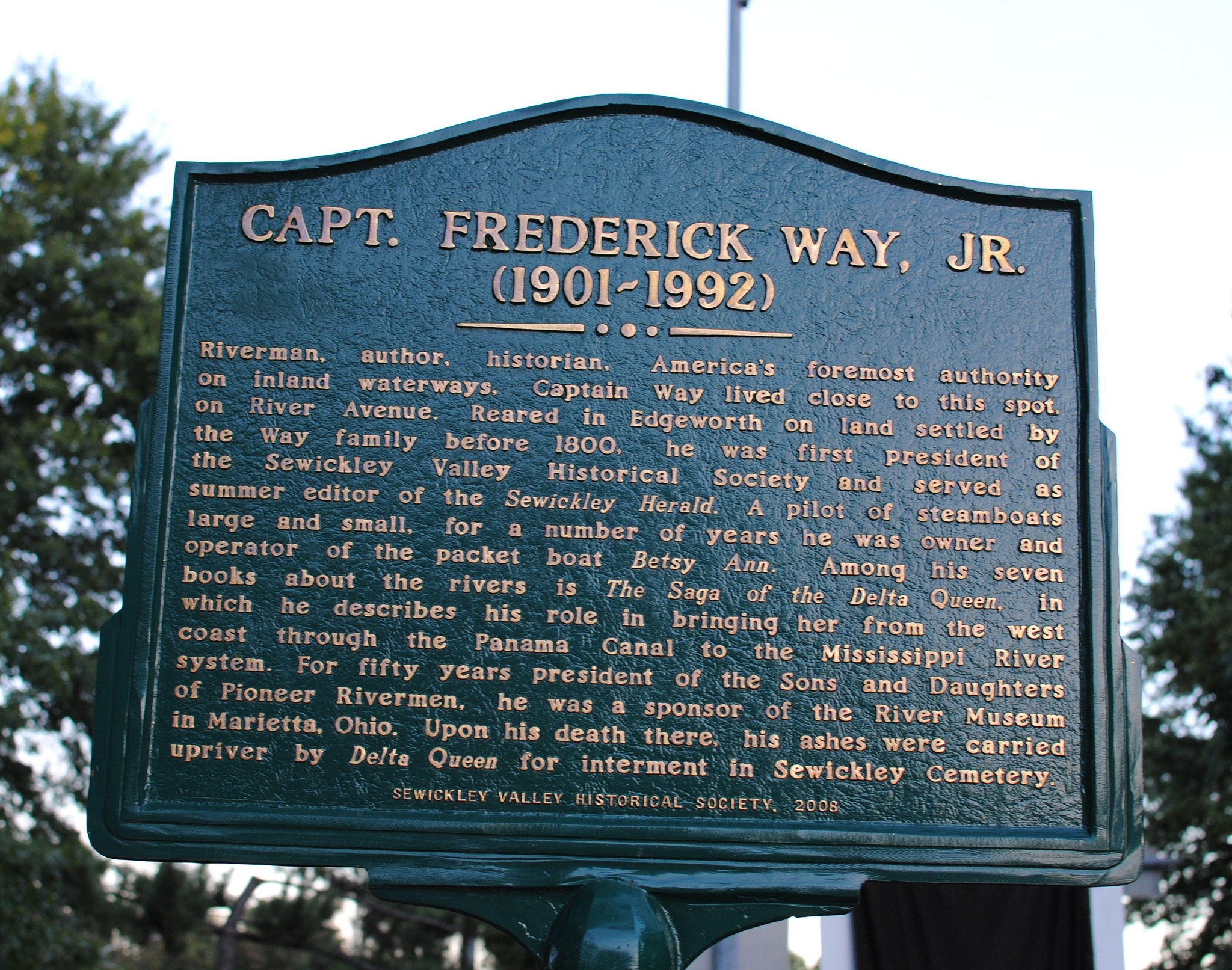
Plaque in Sewickley, Pennsylvania

Fredrick Way Jr. (February 17, 1901 – October 3, 1992) was the youngest steamboat captain on the Ohio River and Mississippi River. He was the author of books on the boats that ply the inland waterways. He supervised the flat-bottom, stern paddlewheeler, the Delta Queen, from San Francisco, down the Pacific coast, through the Panama Canal, across the Gulf of Mexico and up the Mississippi and Ohio rivers to Pittsburgh in 1946.

== Biography ==
He was born on February 17, 1901. Little is known of his youth. He apparently gravitated to a life on the river early, as he obtained his pilot's license in 1923 at the age of 22 and purchased his first steamboat, the Betsy Ann, in 1925, at the age of 24. He married Grace Morrison and they resided in Sewickley, Pennsylvania.

Using the iron-hulled Betsy Ann, Way ran a packet ship between Cincinnati and Pittsburgh for a number of years. Prior to Way's purchase of the Betsy Ann, she had held the packet ship speed record on the Mississippi River since the 1900s, winning and retaining a set of gold-tipped elk horns. In August 1928, Way and the Betsy Ann lost the elk horns to Captain Christopher Becker Greene of the steamboat Chris Greene, in a race from Cincinnati to New Richmond.

In 1933 Way wrote a book of his experiences as a river packet ship captain called The Log of the Betsy Ann. The book was moderately successful, allowing Way to form the Steamboat Photo Company (SPC) in 1939. SPC gathered the largest collection of steamboat photos then known, and became the impetus for the publication of Way’s Steamboat Directory in 1944 and the formation of the Sons and Daughters of Pioneer Rivermen (SDPR), of which Way was a founding member and later a president. SDPR became the driving force behind the formation of the Ohio River Museum in Marietta, Ohio.

In 1948, at the request of his friend Tom Greene, Way captained the 21-year-old Delta Queen from San Francisco to Pittsburgh. He wrote about the adventure of piloting the paddle wheeler down the west coast, through the Panama Canal, across the Gulf of Mexico and up the Mississippi River to Pittsburgh in The Saga of the Delta Queen.

Way continued to be an active writer, collector of steamboat and packet ship photographs, and preserver of the history of boats on inland waterways. He started publishing the quarterly journal The S&D Reflector for the SDPR organization in March 1964.

He died on October 3, 1992, in Marietta, Ohio. His cremains were taken to Sewickley for burial next to his beloved Grace by the Str. Delta Queen.
