= Ohio River Museum =

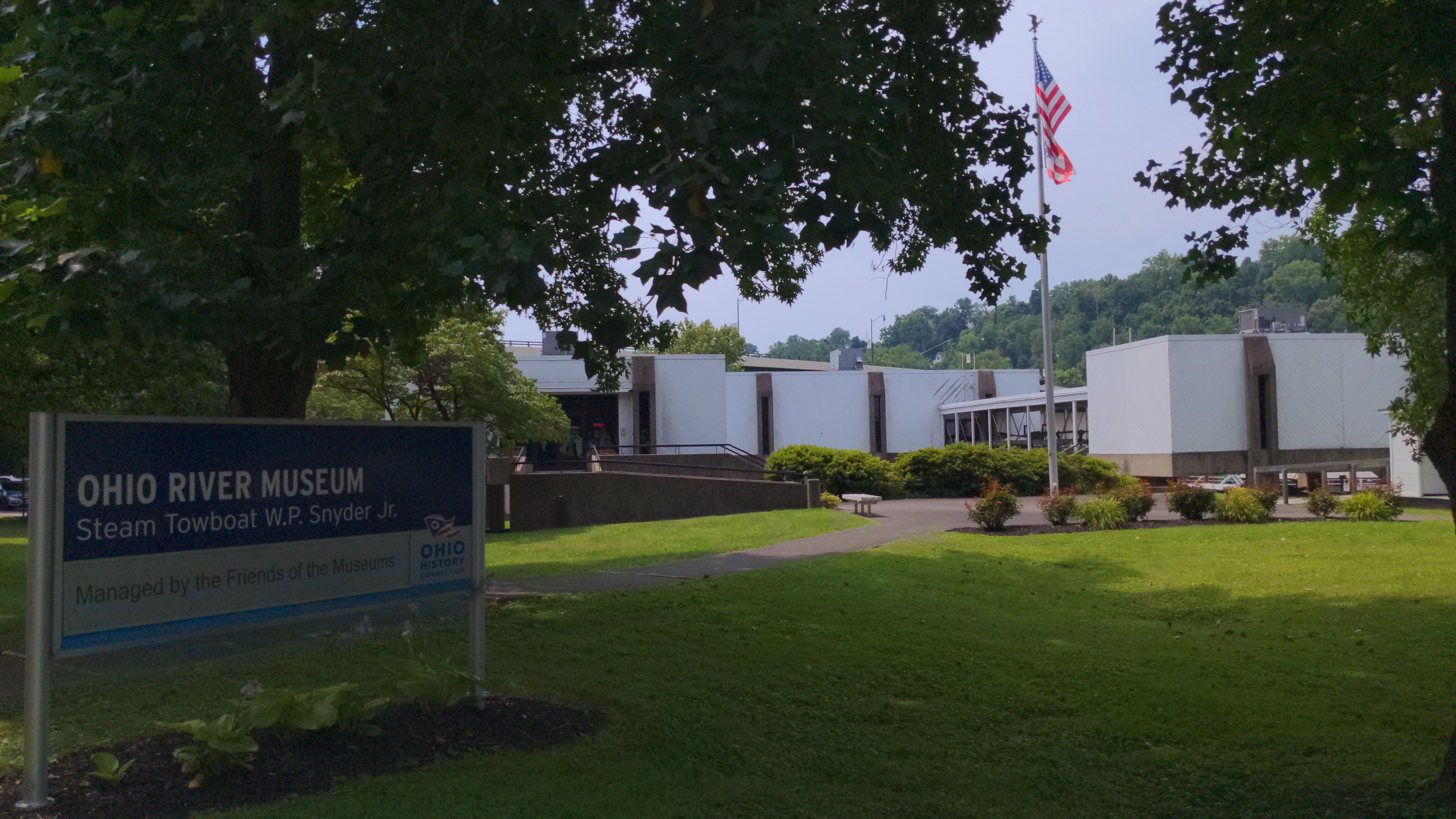
- Established: 16 March 1941
- Location: Marietta, Ohio
- Coordinates: 39°25′14″N 81°27′46″W
- Type: maritime museum
- Key holdings: W. P. Snyder Jr. (towboat)
- Parking: On site (no cost)
- Website: mariettamuseums.org/ohio-river-museum/

Marietta Museums
- Campus Martius Museum; Ohio River Museum

The Ohio River Museum is a museum that interprets the history of the Ohio River. The museum is situated on the Muskingum River, near its confluence with the Ohio River, in Marietta, Ohio. Opened on March 16, 1941, the museum celebrated its 75th anniversary in 2016.

Among the museum's collection is the W.P. Snyder, Jr., the last steam-powered towboat on the river.

The oldest remaining pilothouse is from the steamboat Tell City. The steamboat was built in 1889 and used to carry passengers and freight on the Ohio River. She was named after the city of Tell City, Indiana, on the banks of the Ohio River. She sank on April 6, 1917, in Little Hocking, Ohio. The pilothouse survived the sinking and is on display outside of the museum.

The museum is located a block from the Campus Martius Museum.

The Ohio River Museum is currently closed as a new museum will be constructed on the site. Partners in the new museum project include Ohio History Connection, Friends of the Museums dba Northwest Territory Museum Society, the Washington County Public Library and the Sons and Daughters of the Pioneer Rivermen.
