= W. P. Snyder Jr. (towboat) =

Stern-wheel boat, docked in Marietta, Ohio

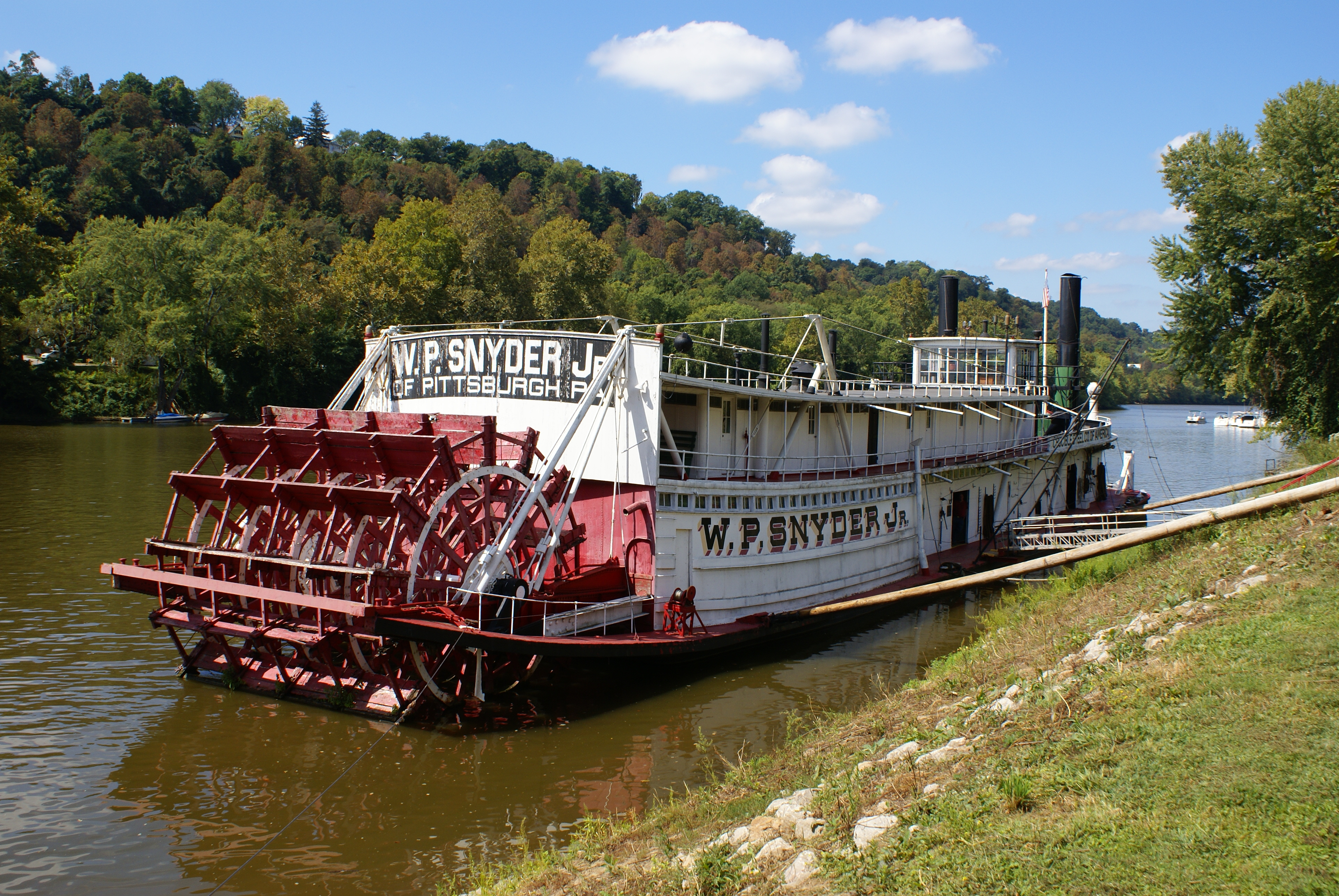
- W. P. Snyder Jr. at permanent mooring in Marietta, Ohio

History

United States
- Name: W. H. Clingerman (1918–1938); J. L. Perry (1938–1945); A-1 (1945–1945); W. P. Snyder Jr. (1945–)
- Owner: Carnegie Steel Company (1918–1945); Crucible Steel Company (1945–1955); Ohio Historical Society (1955–)
- Builder: Rees & Sons Company
- Launched: 1918
- Status: Museum ship

General characteristics
- Length: 175 ft (53 m) (LOA)
- Beam: 28.4 ft (8.7 m) (original); 32.3 ft (9.8 m) (modified)
- Depth: 5.2 ft (1.6 m)
- Installed power: 2 × Tandem compound steam engines 750 hp (560 kW)
- Propulsion: Sternwheel
- W. P. Snyder Jr. (steamboat)
- U.S. National Register of Historic Places
- U.S. National Historic Landmark
- Location within Ohio
- Location: Muskingum River docked as part of the Ohio River Museum in Marietta, Ohio
- Coordinates: 39°25′13″N 81°27′48″W
- Built: 1918
- Architect: Rees, James & Sons
- NRHP reference No.: 70000522

Significant dates
- Added to NRHP: 10 November 1970
- Designated NHL: 29 June 1989

W. P. Snyder Jr., also known as W. H. Clingerman, W. P. Snyder Jr. State Memorial, or J. L. Perry, is a historic towboat moored on the Muskingum River in Marietta, Ohio, at the Ohio River Museum. A National Historic Landmark, she is the only intact, steam-driven sternwheel towboat still on the nation's river system.

== Description and history ==
W. P. Snyder Jr. is a sternwheel, steam driven, towboat that was originally built as the Carnegie Steel Company towboat W. H. Clingerman in 1918 by Rees & Sons Company of Pittsburgh, Pennsylvania. In 1938, she was renamed J. L. Perry, and in 1945 A-1. In August 1945, she was sold to Crucible Steel Company of Pittsburgh, and renamed the W. P. Snyder Jr. in September 1945.

She was a sister vessel of W. H. Colvin Jr., and she towed coal on the Monongahela River until being laid up on 23 September 1953, at Crucible, Pennsylvania. In the summer of 1955, the boat was given to the Ohio Historical Society for exhibit at the Ohio River Museum in Marietta, Ohio. W. P. Snyder Jr. was the last steamboat locking through Lock 1, on the Muskingum River, before that lock was removed. She arrived in Marietta, Ohio, with Captain Fred Way Jr. as master on 16 September 1955.

As one of the first steel hull towboats constructed, she was fitted with the prominent anti-hogging struts and cables necessary on wooden hulled stern wheelers. At the time it wasn't known if they would be needed with the steel hull construction.

W. P. Snyder Jr. has been permanently moored on the Muskingum River in Marietta, Ohio, at the Ohio River Museum. Visitors to the museum receive a guided tour of W. P. Snyder Jr..

She is "the only intact, steam-driven sternwheel towboat still on the nation's river system", but was "in danger of sinking" in 2009. On 21 November 2009, W.P. Snyder Jr. was towed from Marietta to South Point, Ohio, to have her hull replaced. W. P. Snyder Jr. made her way home starting 15 September 2010 and arrived back in the Muskingum River at Marietta on 17 September 2010.
