= Pusher (boat) =

Boat designed for pushing barges

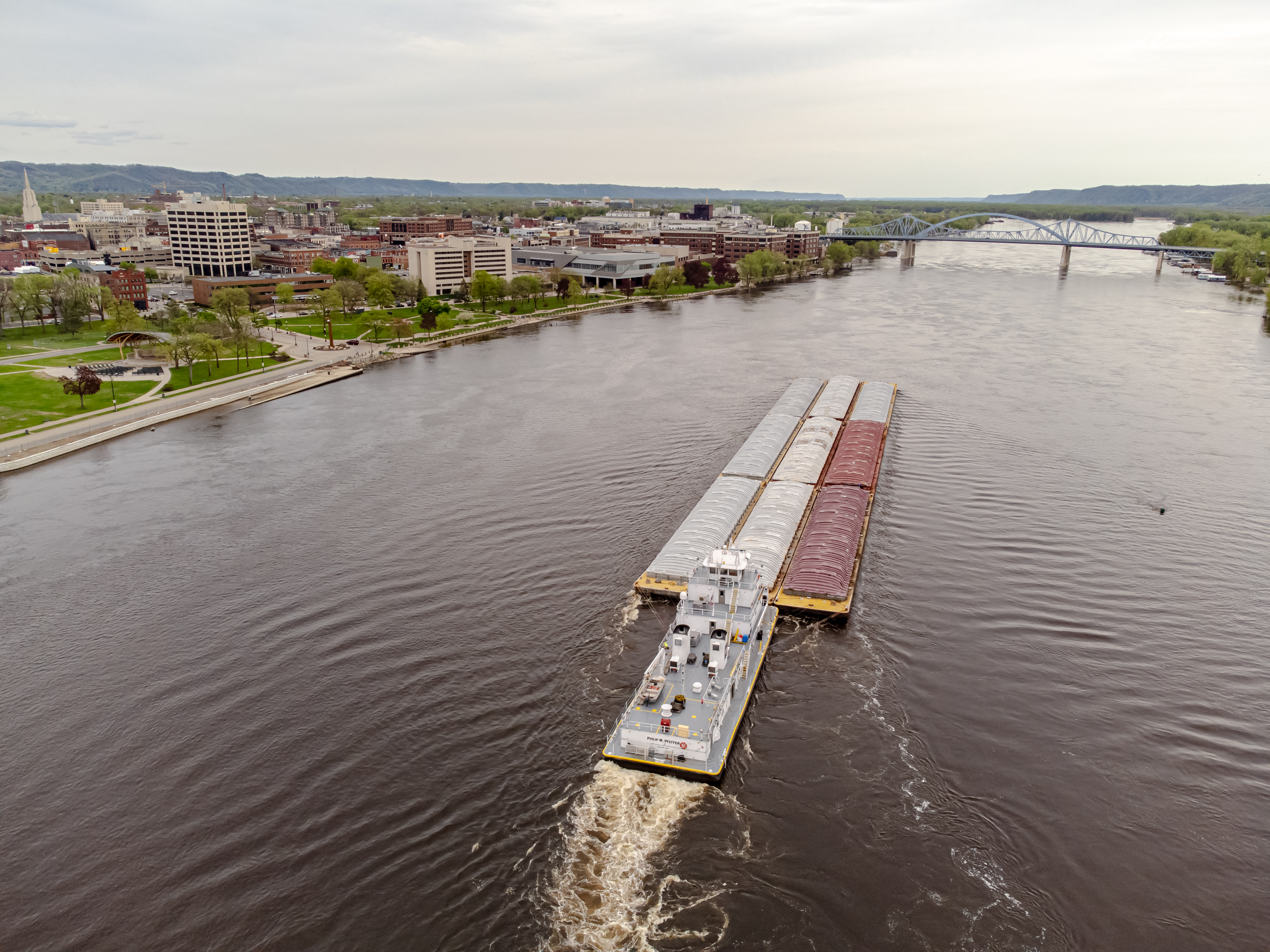
3x3 nine unit barge going through La Crosse, Wisconsin

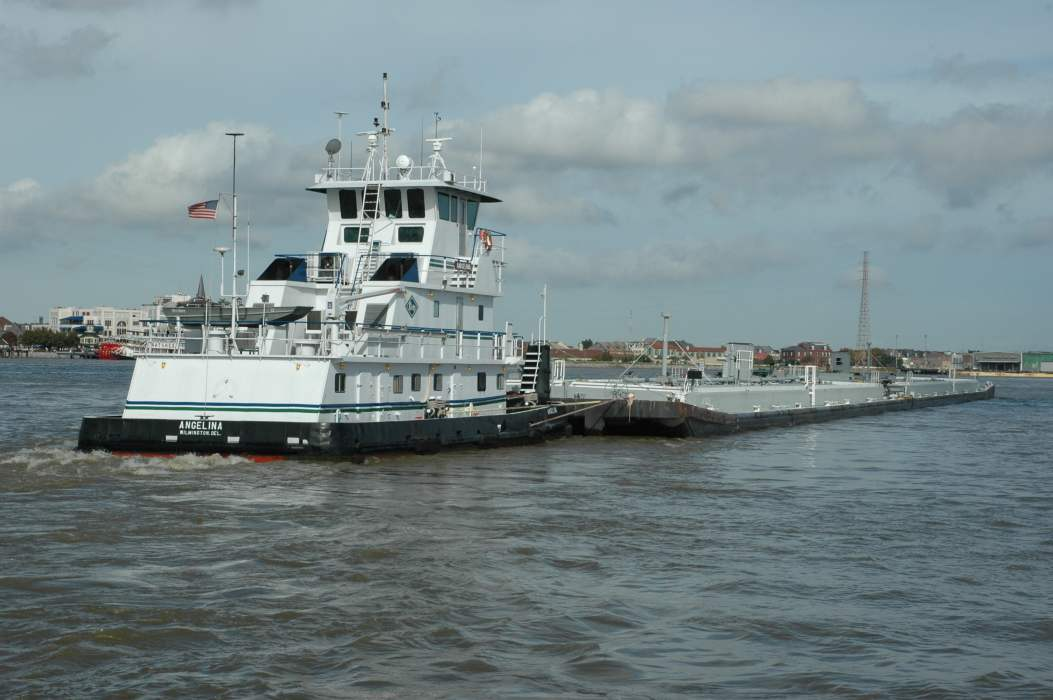
The towboat Angelina pushes two loaded barges in New Orleans.

A pusher, pusher craft, pusher boat, pusher tug, or towboat, is a boat designed for pushing barges or car floats. In the United States, the industries that use these vessels refer to them as towboats. These vessels are characterized by a square bow and a shallow draft, and they typically have knees, which are large plates mounted to the bow for pushing barges of various heights. These boats usually operate on rivers and inland waterways. Multiple barges lashed together, or a boat and any barges lashed to it, are referred to as a tow and can have dozens of barges. Many of these vessels, especially the long-haul boats, include living quarters for the crew.

== Size ==
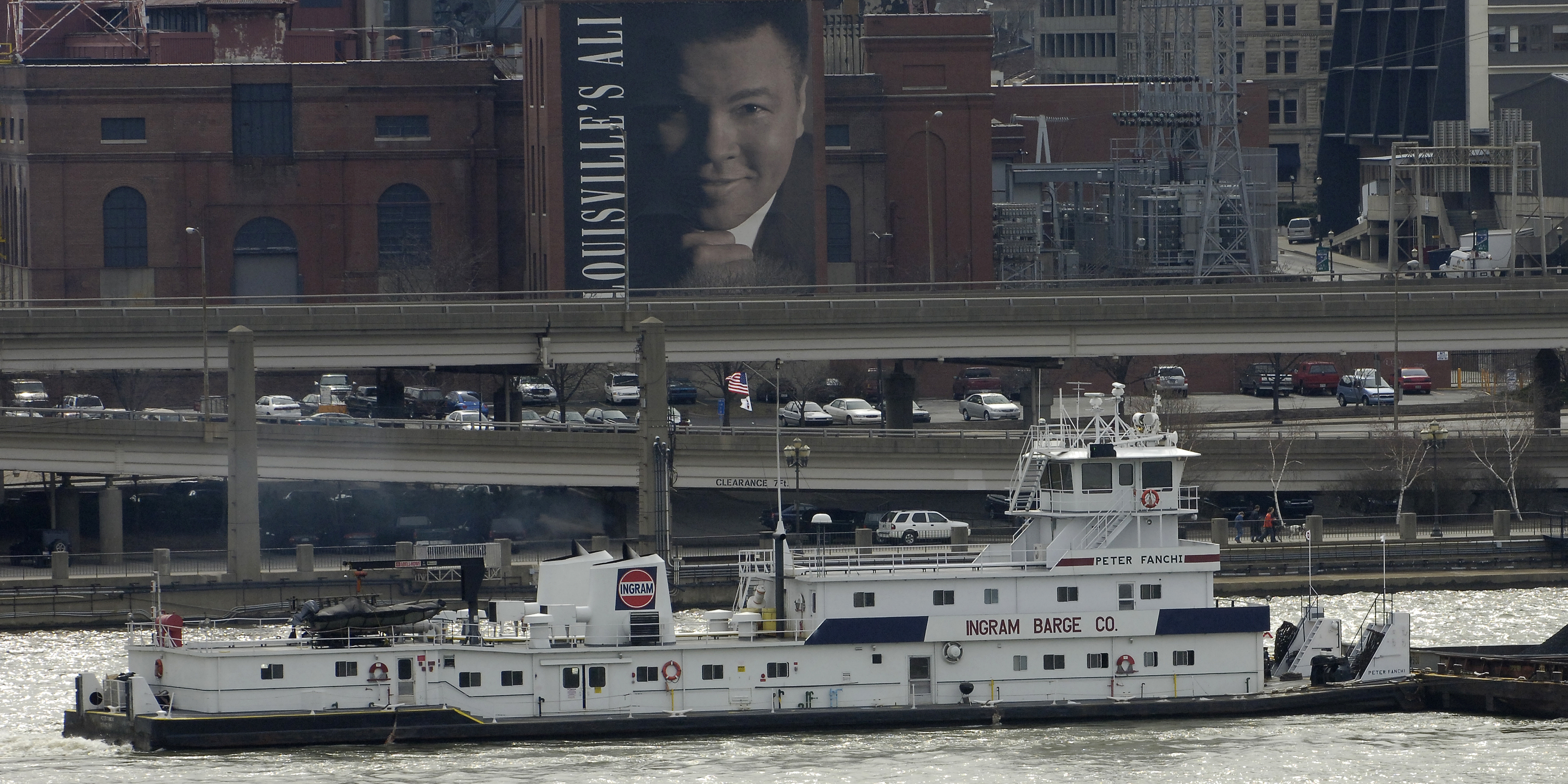
The towboat Peter Fanchi southbound on the Ohio river at Louisville, Kentucky

Towboat engine outputs range from less than 600 horsepower (447 kW) up to 11,100 horsepower (8,277 kW). Most towboats are from 35 to 200 feet (11 to 61 m) long, and 21 to 56 feet (6.4 to 17.1 m) wide. Smaller boats are used in harbors, fleeting areas and around locks while larger boats operate in "line-haul" operations over long distances and between major ports. In the United States, south of the Chain of Rocks Lock across from St. Louis on the Mississippi River, the river is open with no locks or impediments other than channel size and depth. Larger boats can run this segment of the river with the maximum tow size of 42 barges southbound and 40+ northbound. A typical River tow might be 35 to 42 barges, each about 200 feet (61 m) long by 35 feet (11 m) wide, configured in a rectangular shape 6 to 7 barges long and 5 to 6 barges wide, depending on the number of barges in tow. The whole tow, excluding the towboat, can easily be over 1,200 feet (370 m) long and 200 feet (61 m) wide, covering over 6 acres (2.4 ha) and holding thousands of tons of cargo.

In the United States above St. Louis on the Upper Mississippi River and on other rivers such as the Illinois, Ohio, Arkansas, Tennessee and Cumberland, boats can handle only up to 16 barges including a "hip" barge due to the size of lock chambers. These boats tend to be limited to 5,000 horsepower (3,728 kW).

Towboats in line-haul service operate 24/7 and have the latest in navigational equipment, such as color radar, GPS systems, electronic river charts, and specialized radio communications.

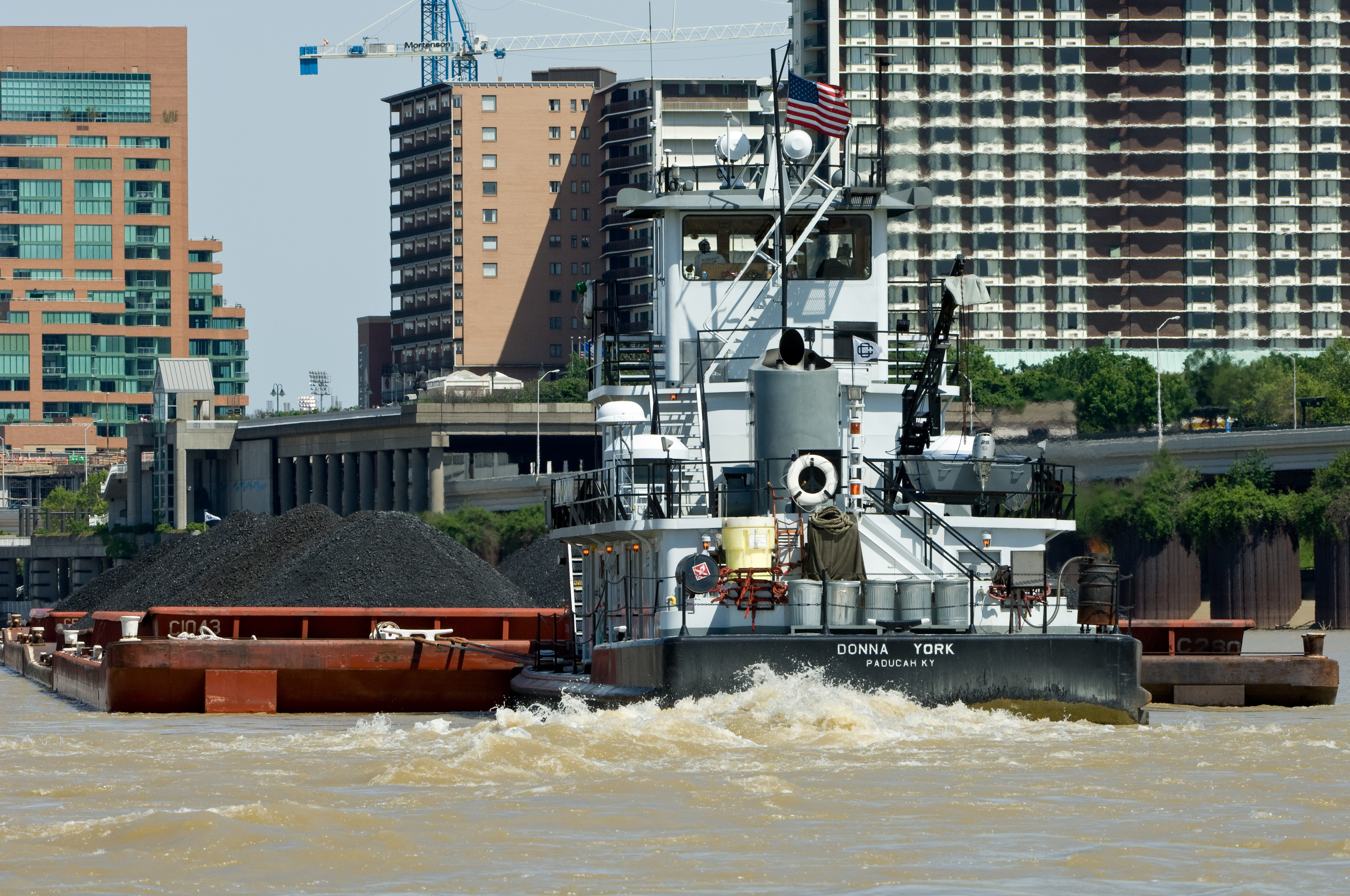
The Donna York pushing barges of coal up the Ohio River at Louisville, Kentucky

Boats that traverse the Intracoastal Waterway (ICW) are commonly referred to as "ditch boats" or "canal boats". ICW tows usually consist of 1 to 6 barges ranging in size, usually "strung out" end to end when loaded or "breasted up" side by side when empty.

Towboats always push the "tow" of barges, which are lashed together with steel cables usually 1 to 1.5 in (25.4 to 38.1 mm) in diameter.

== History ==
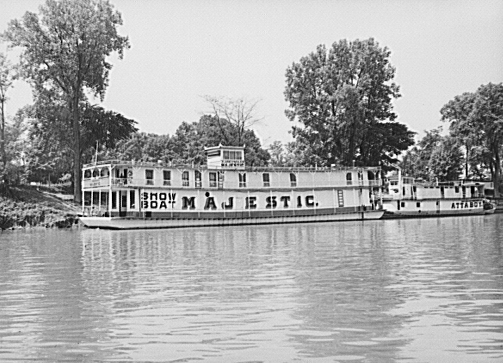
The showboat Majestic being pushed by its towboat Attaboy

The term towboat arises from steamboat days, when steamboat fortunes began to decline and to survive, steamboats began to "tow" wooden barges alongside to earn additional revenue. Eventually, the railroad expansion following the American Civil War ended the steamboat era.

During the 19th century, towboats were used to push showboats, which lacked steam engines to free up space for a theater.

== Preserved towboats ==
The Binnenvaartmuseum ('Inland Shipping Museum') in Dordrecht, South Holland, Netherlands is centered around René Siegfried, a River Rhine pusher boat which was built in 1963 and decommissioned in 1989.

The W. P. Snyder Jr., also known as W. H. Clingerman, W. P. Snyder Jr. State Memorial, or J. L. Perry, is a historic towboat moored on the Muskingum River in Marietta, Ohio, at the Ohio River Museum. A National Historic Landmark, she is the only intact steam-driven sternwheel towboat still on the United States river system.

== Gallery ==
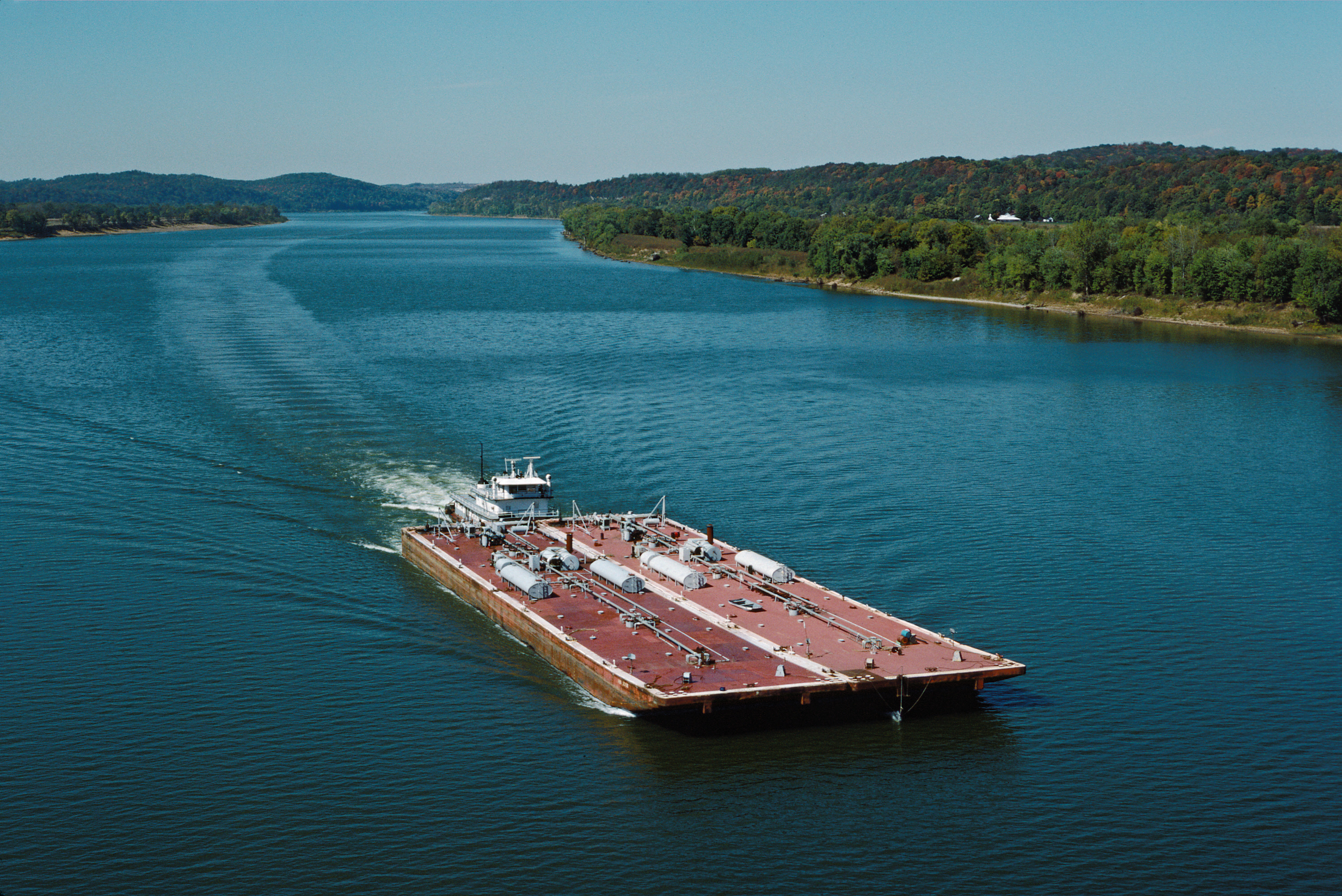
Towboat Ben McCool upbound on Ohio River at Matthew E. Welsh Bridge with two tank barges (1 of 6), near Mauckport, Indiana, USA, 1987

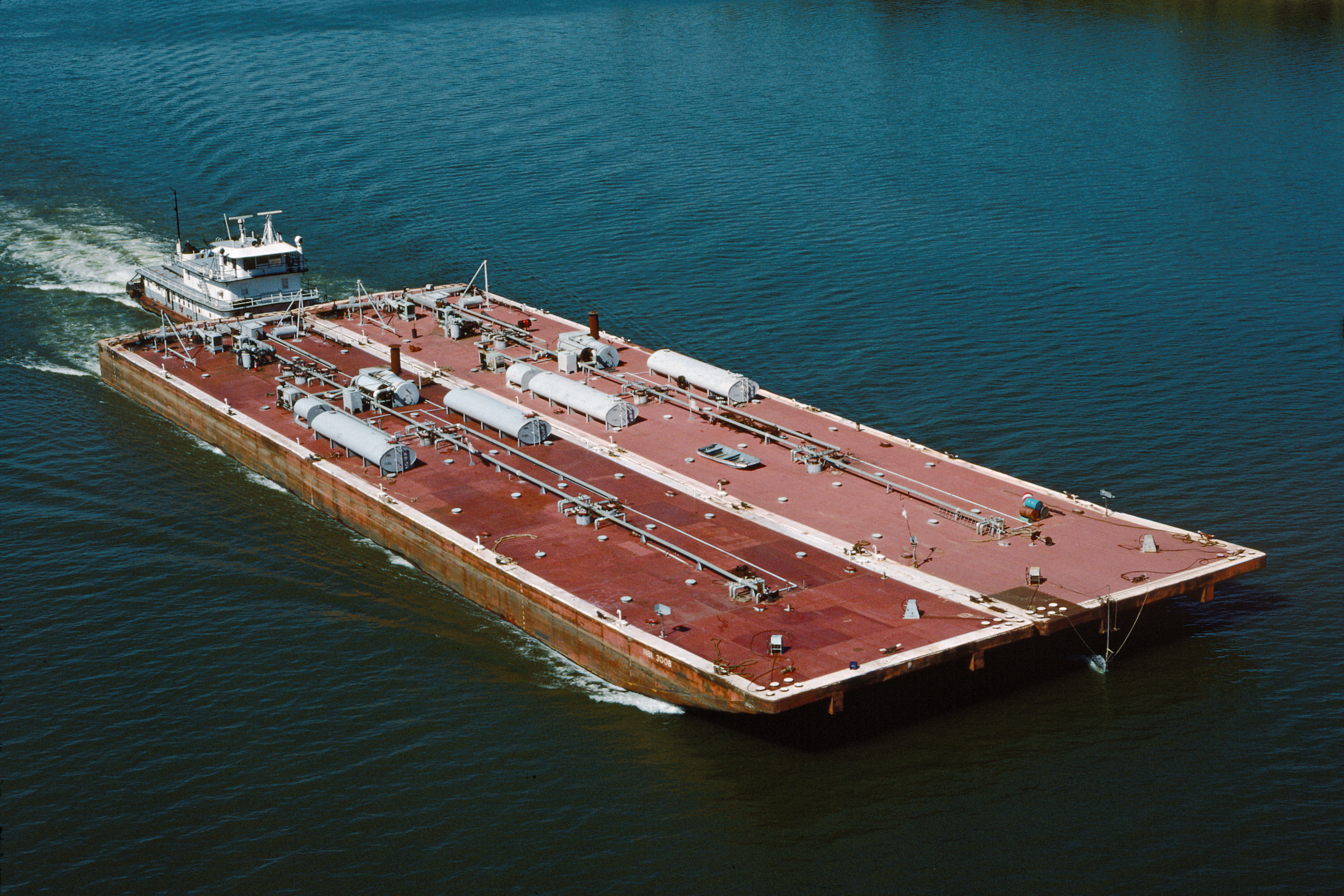
Towboat Ben McCool upbound on Ohio River at Matthew E. Welsh Bridge with two tank barges (2 of 6), near Mauckport, Indiana, USA, 1987

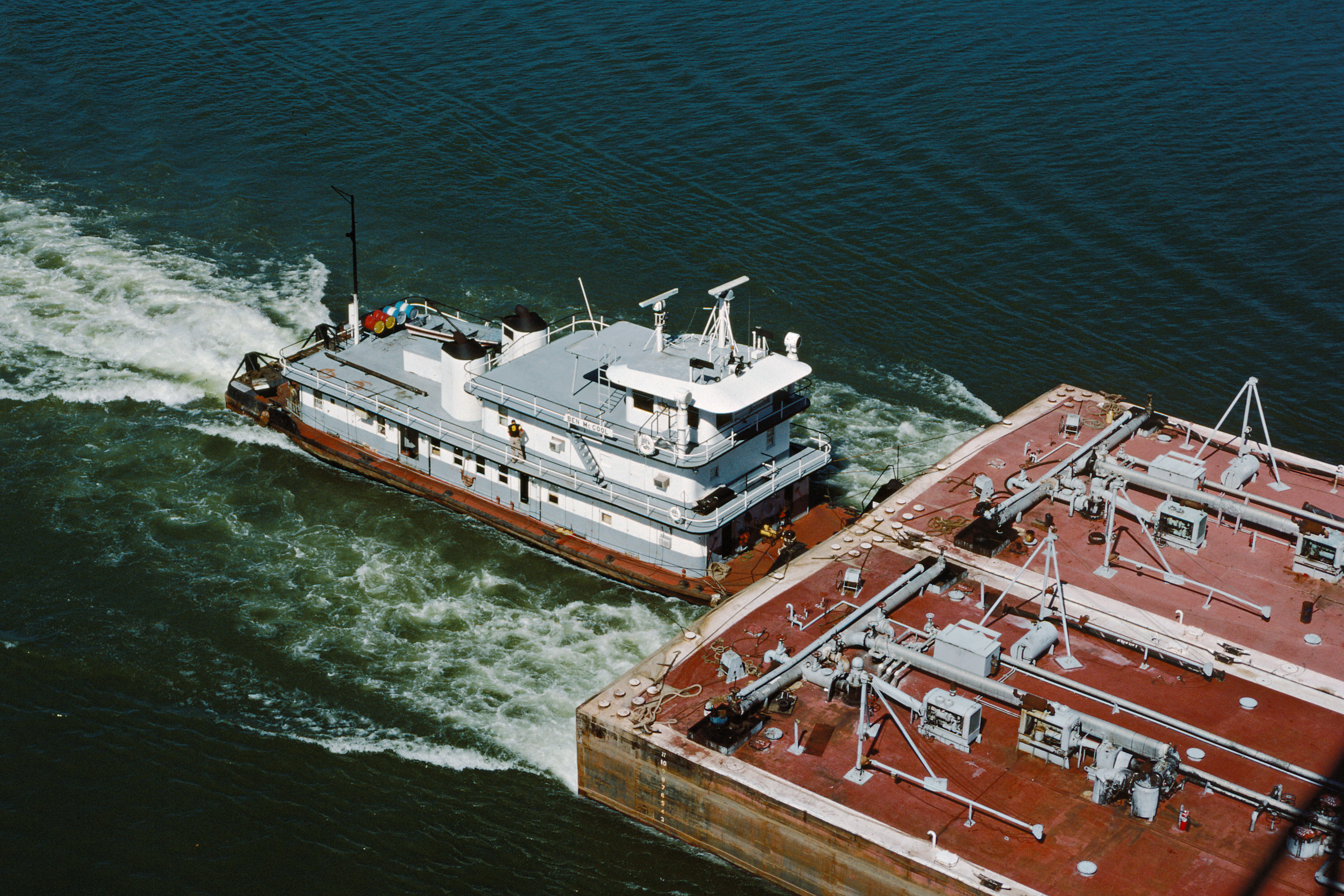
Towboat Ben McCool upbound on Ohio River at Matthew E. Welsh Bridge with two tank barges (3 of 6), near Mauckport, Indiana, USA, 1987

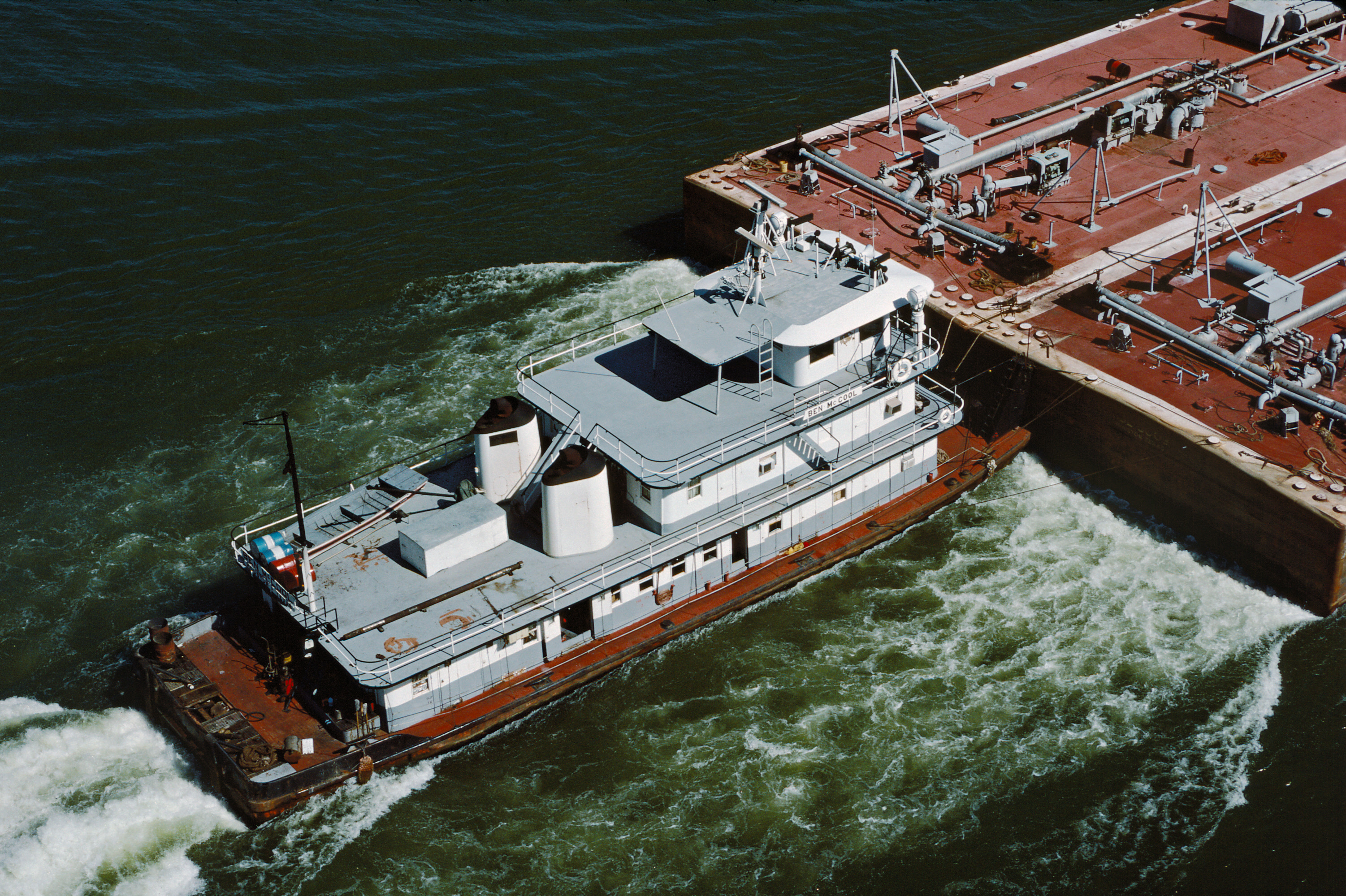
Towboat Ben McCool upbound on Ohio River at Matthew E. Welsh Bridge with two tank barges (4 of 6), near Mauckport, Indiana, USA, 1987

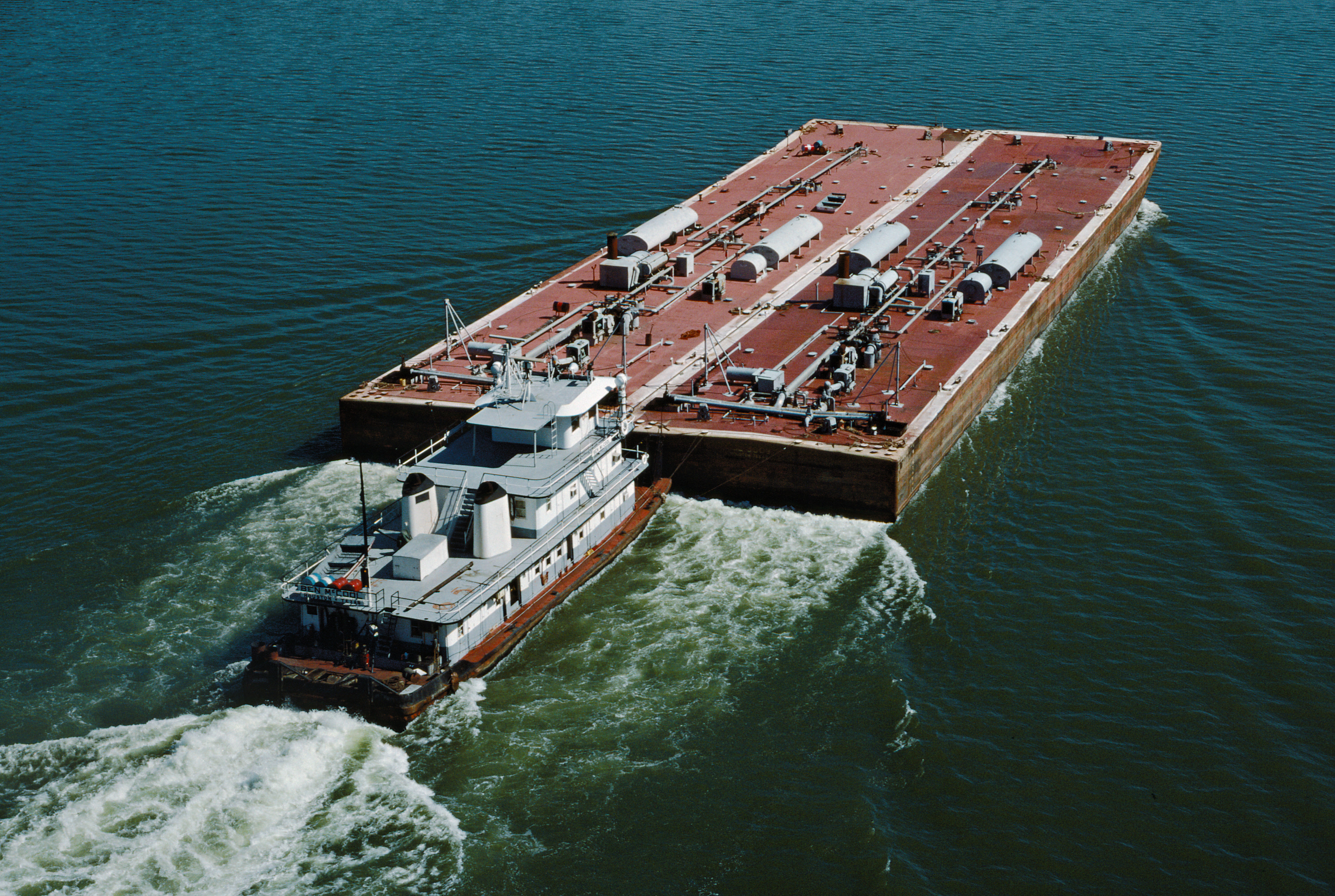
Towboat Ben McCool upbound on Ohio River at Matthew E. Welsh Bridge with two tank barges (5 of 6), near Mauckport, Indiana, USA, 1987

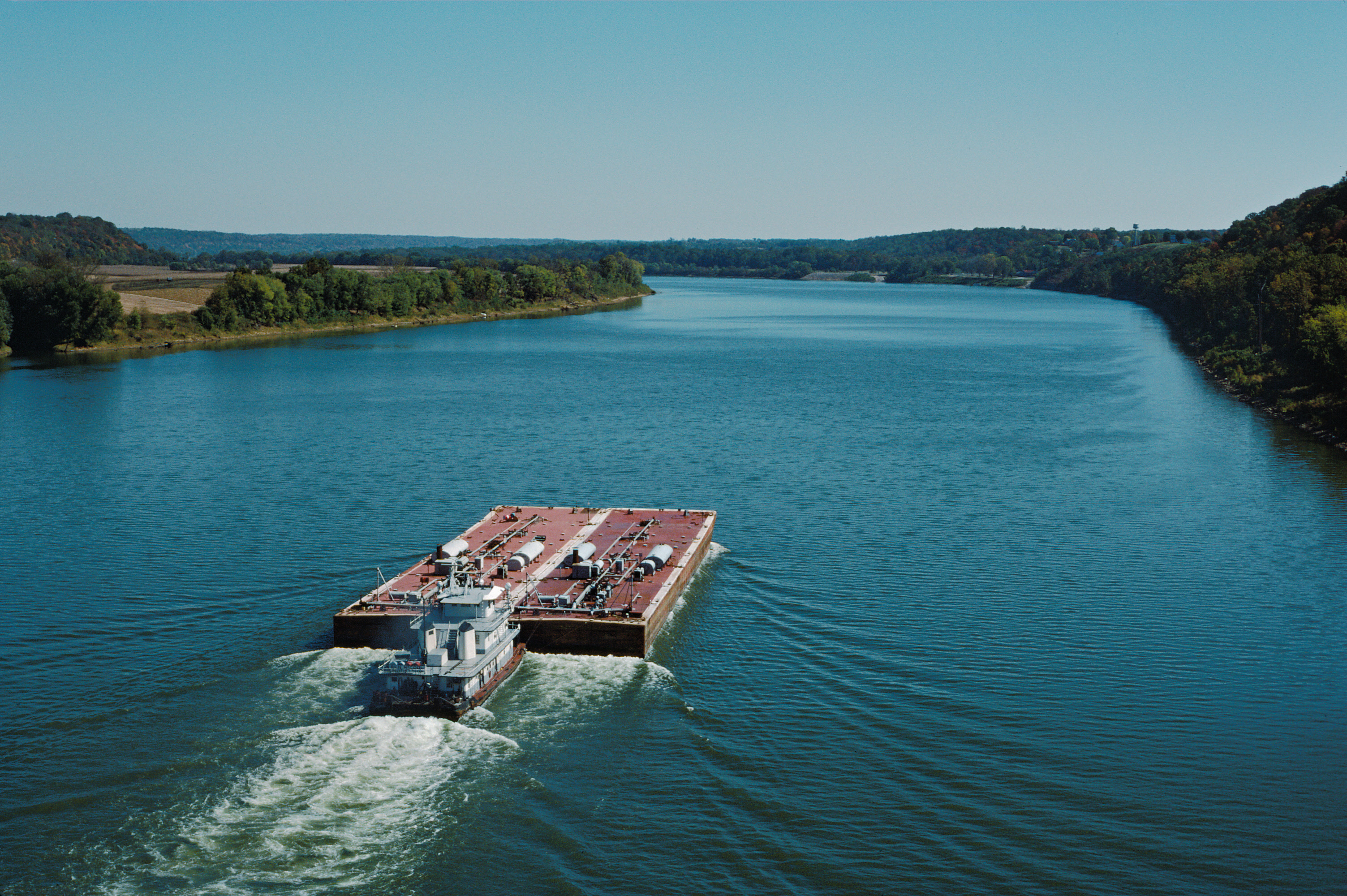
Towboat Ben McCool upbound on Ohio River at Matthew E. Welsh Bridge with two tank barges (6 of 6), near Mauckport, Indiana, USA, 1987

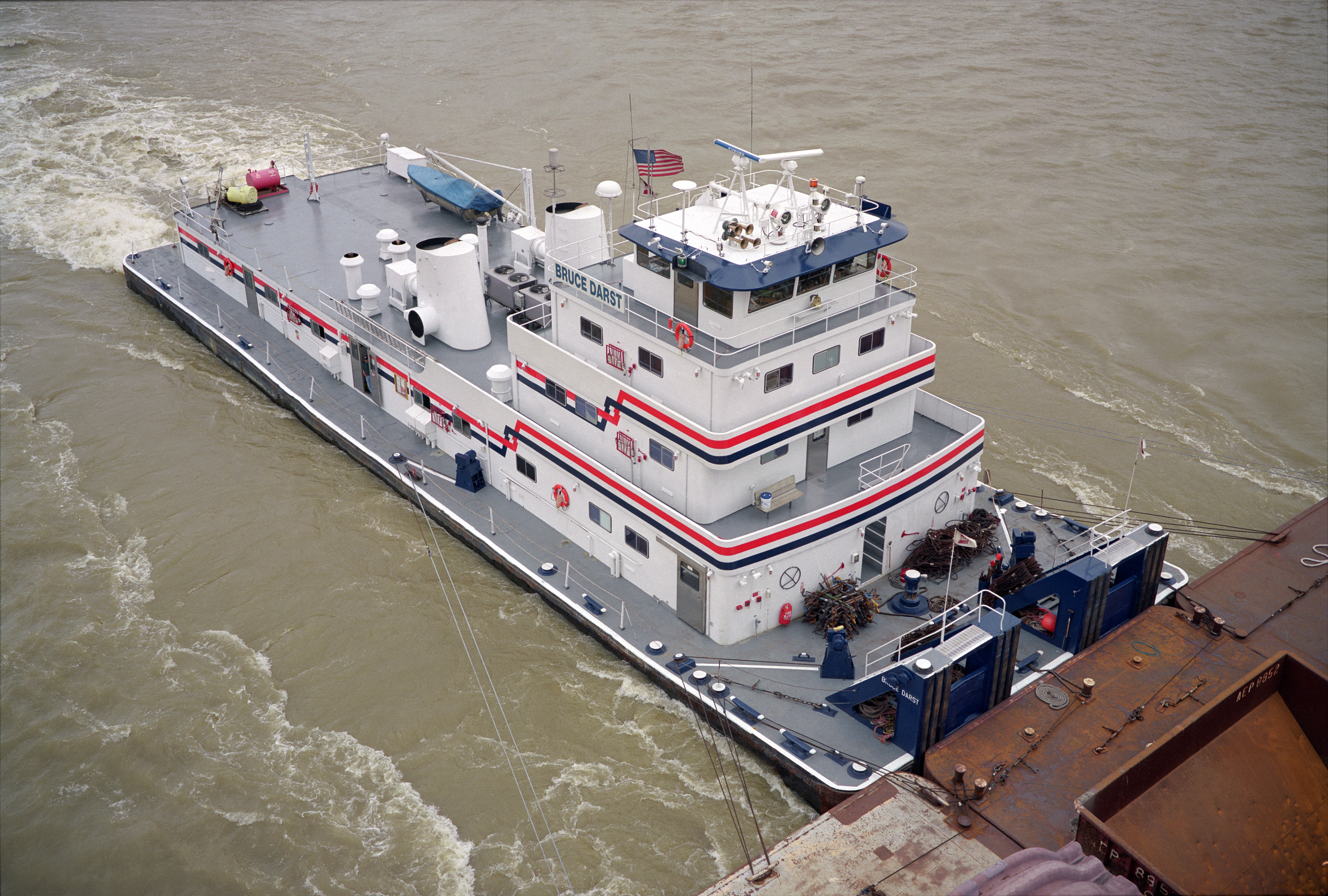
Towboat Bruce Darst upbound on Ohio River at Clark Bridge, Louisville, Kentucky, USA, 2005

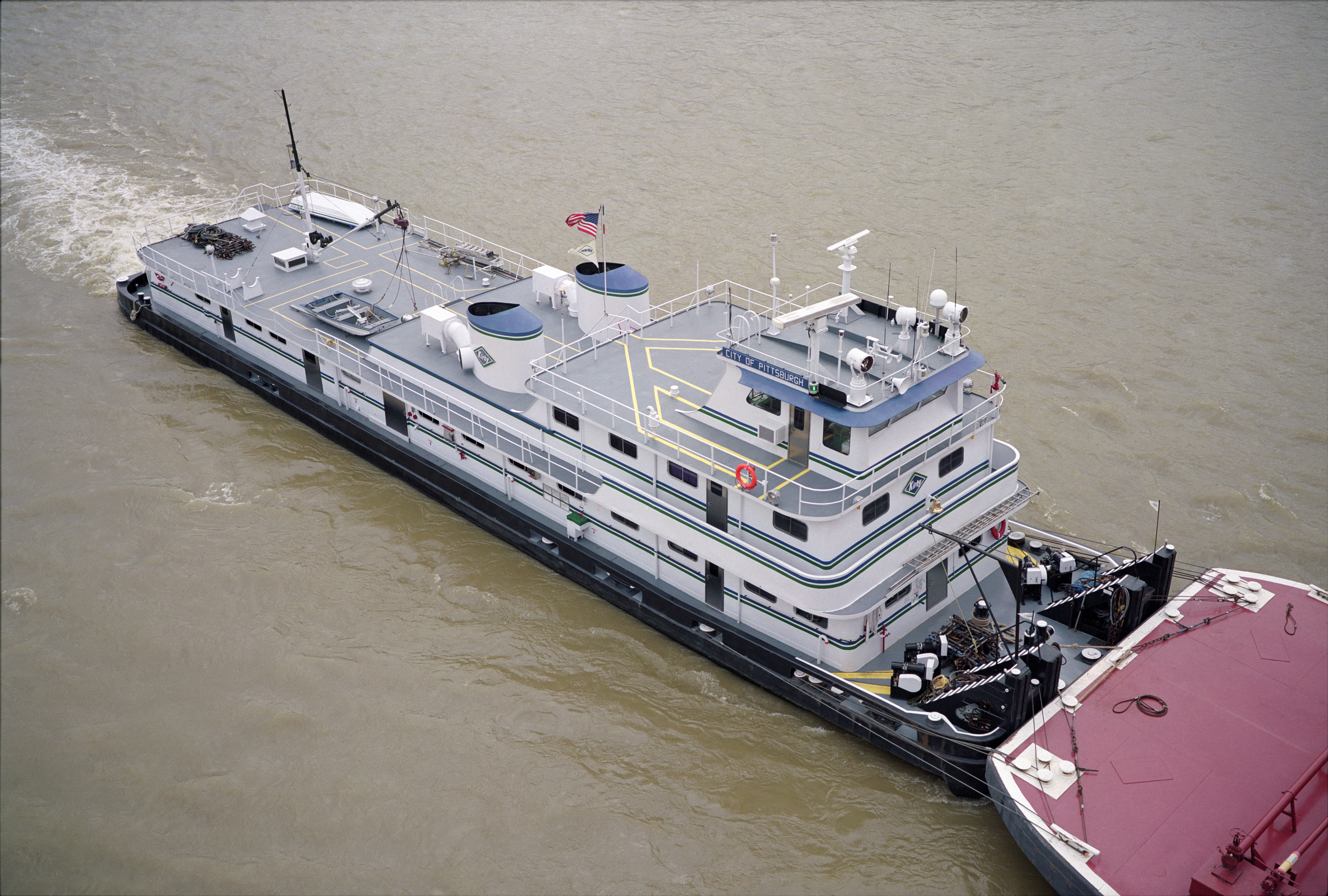
Towboat City of Pittsburgh upbound on Ohio River at Clark Bridge, Louisville, Kentucky, USA, 2005

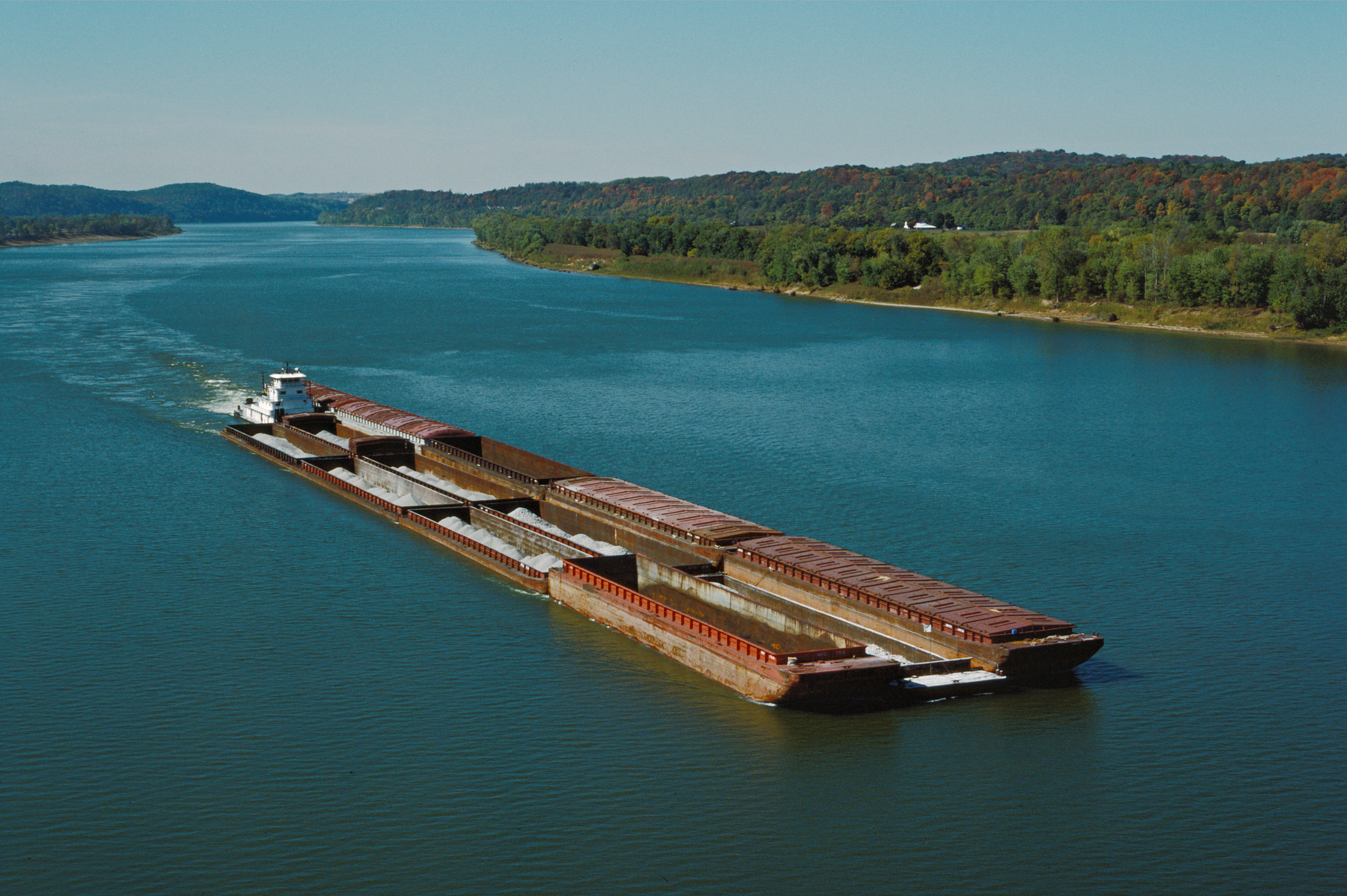
Towboat Dakota Storm upbound on Ohio River at Matthew E. Welsh Bridge (1 of 4), near Mauckport, Indiana, USA, 1987

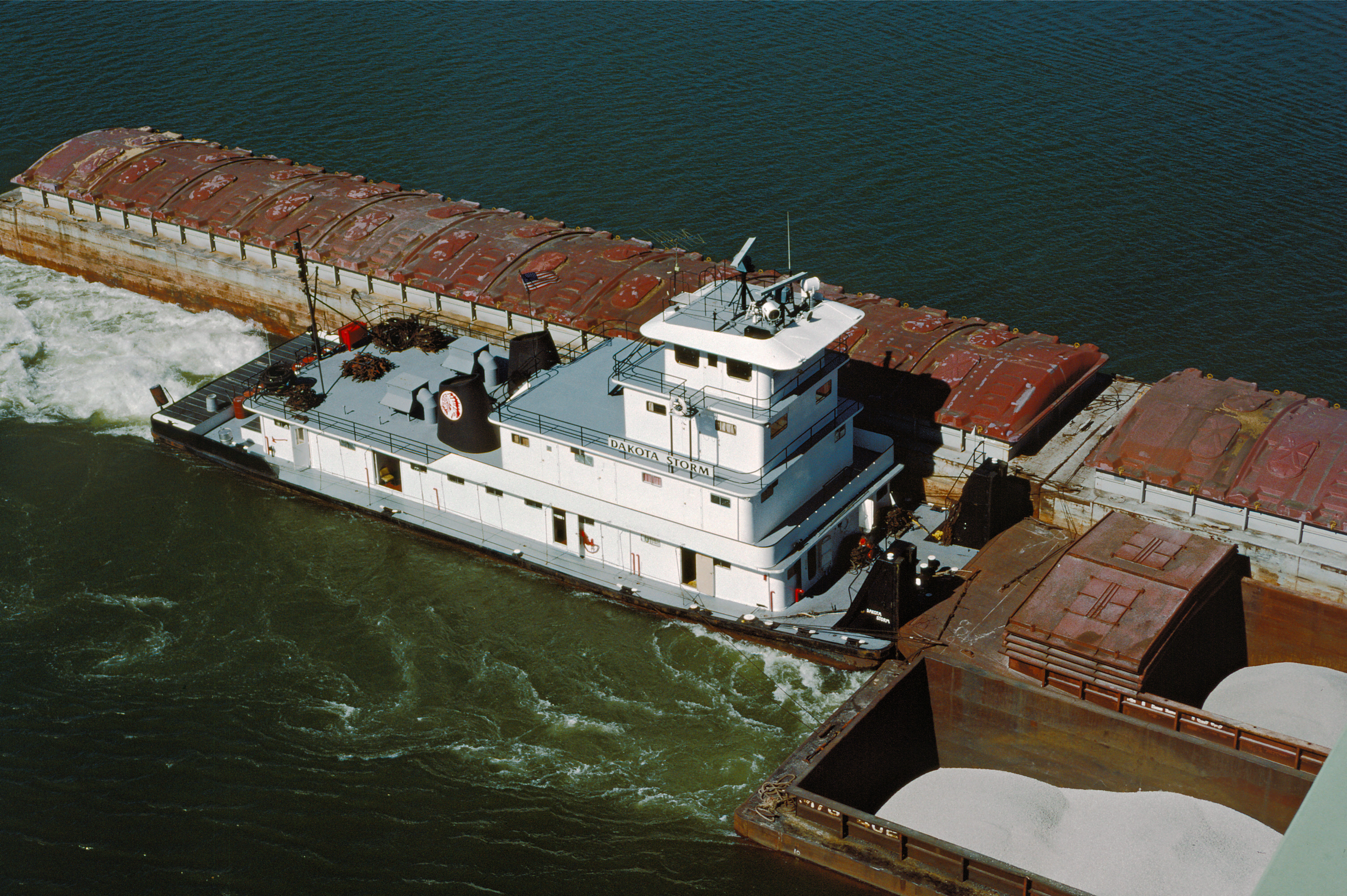
Towboat Dakota Storm upbound on Ohio River at Matthew E. Welsh Bridge (2 of 4), near Mauckport, Indiana, USA, 1987

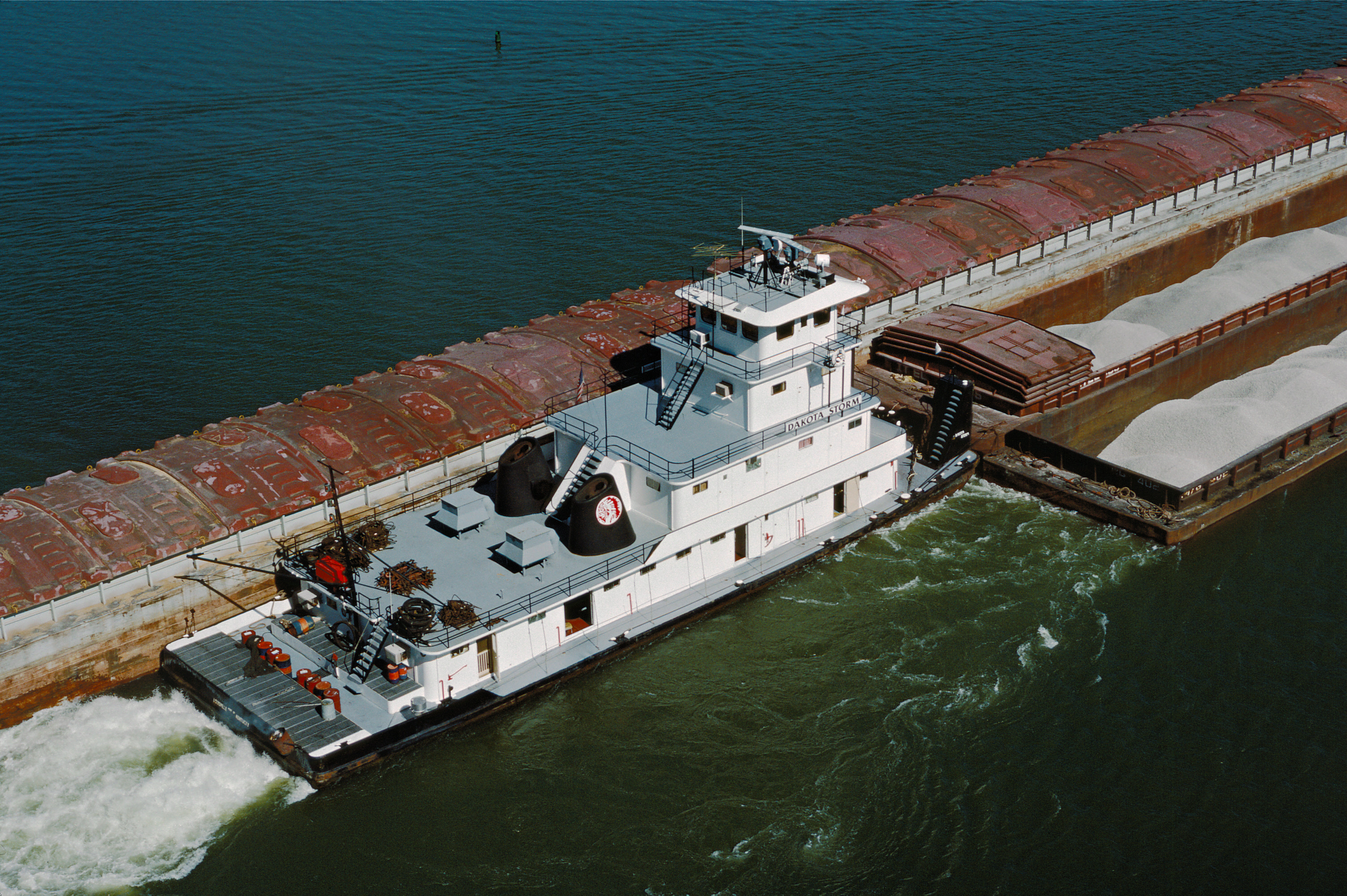
Towboat Dakota Storm upbound on Ohio River at Matthew E. Welsh Bridge (3 of 4), near Mauckport, Indiana, USA, 1987

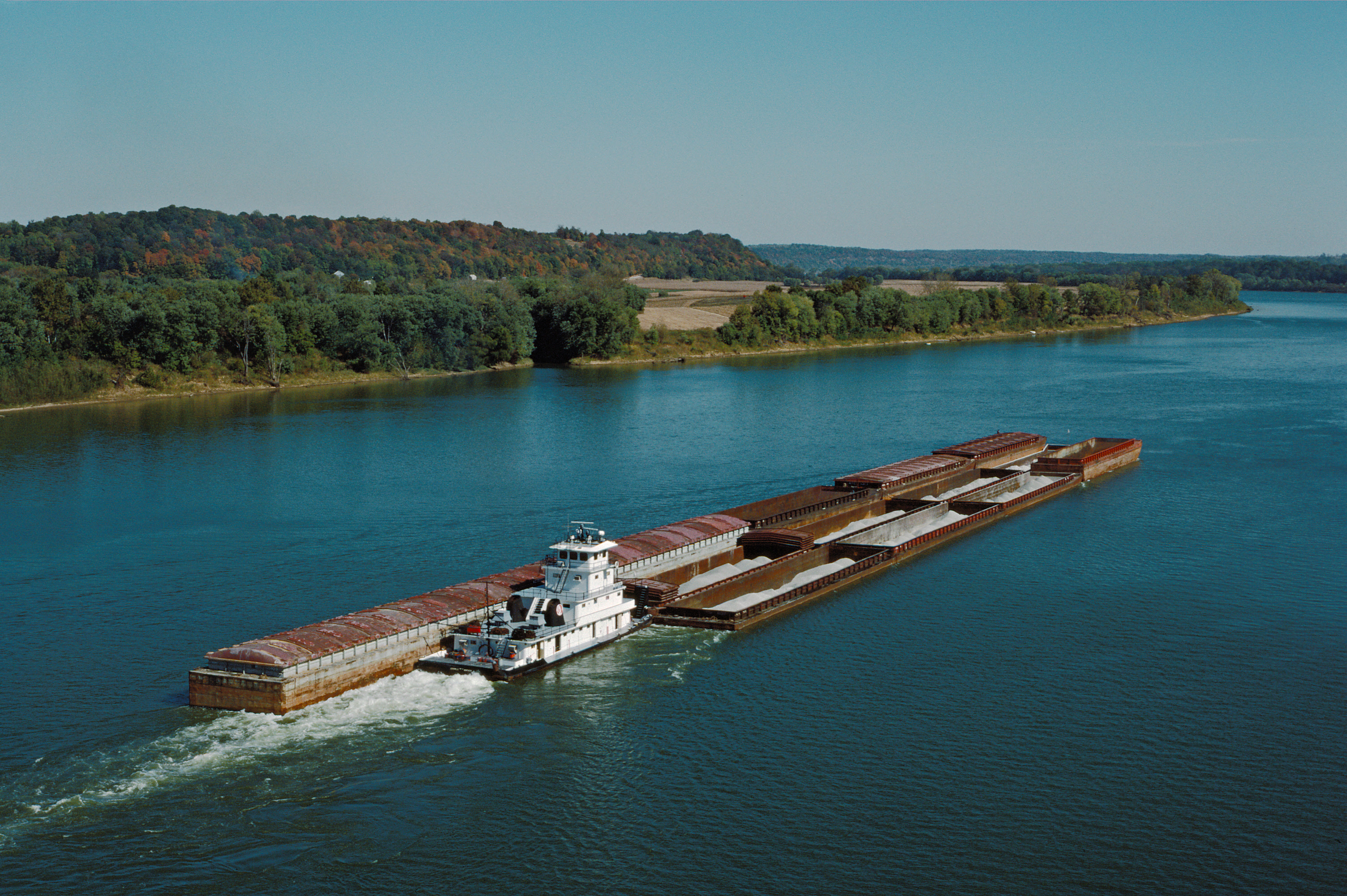
Towboat Dakota Storm upbound on Ohio River at Matthew E. Welsh Bridge (4 of 4), near Mauckport, Indiana, USA, 1987

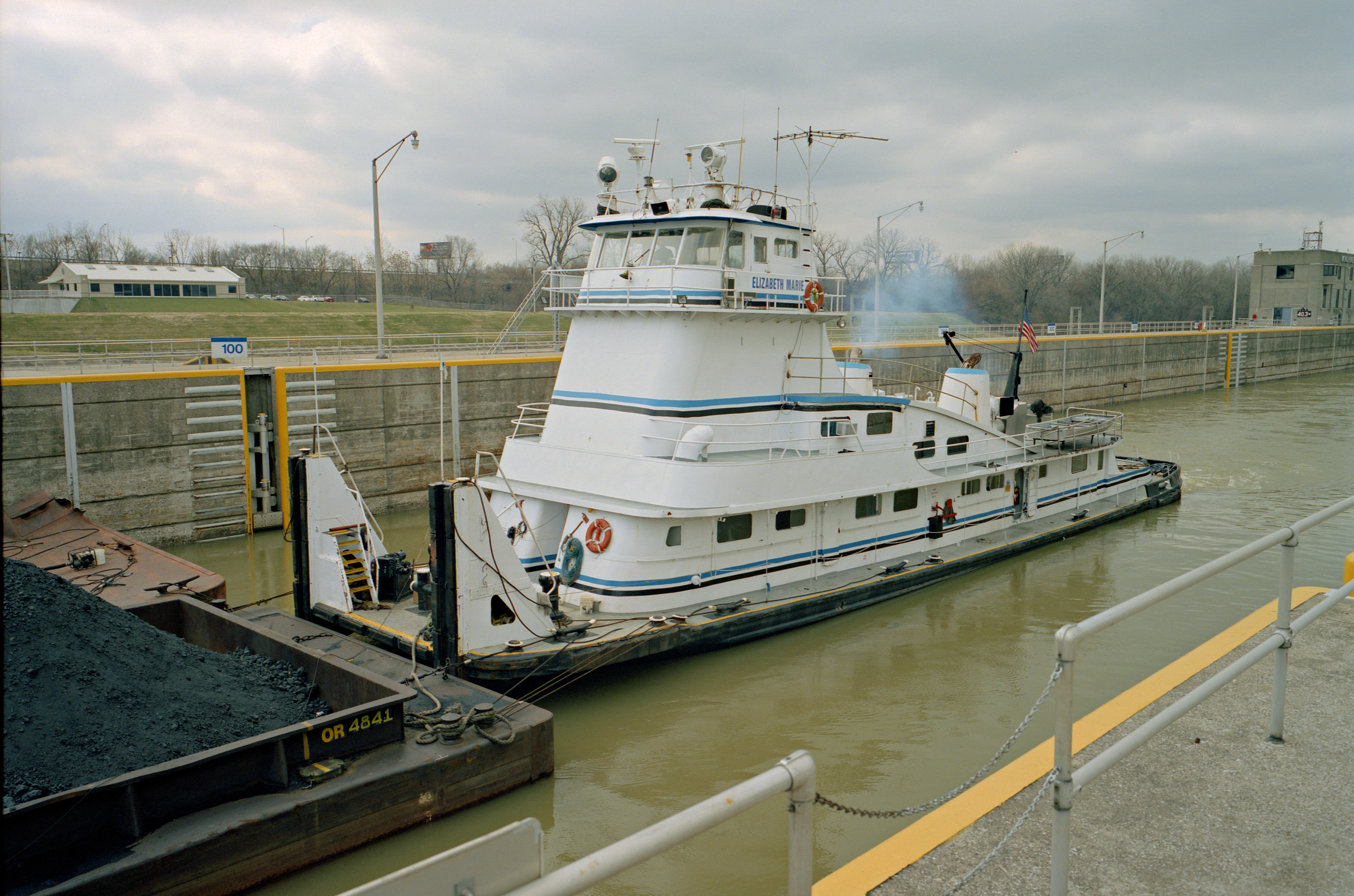
Towboat Elizabeth Marie departing main lock at McAlpine Locks on Ohio River, Louisville, Kentucky, USA, 1999

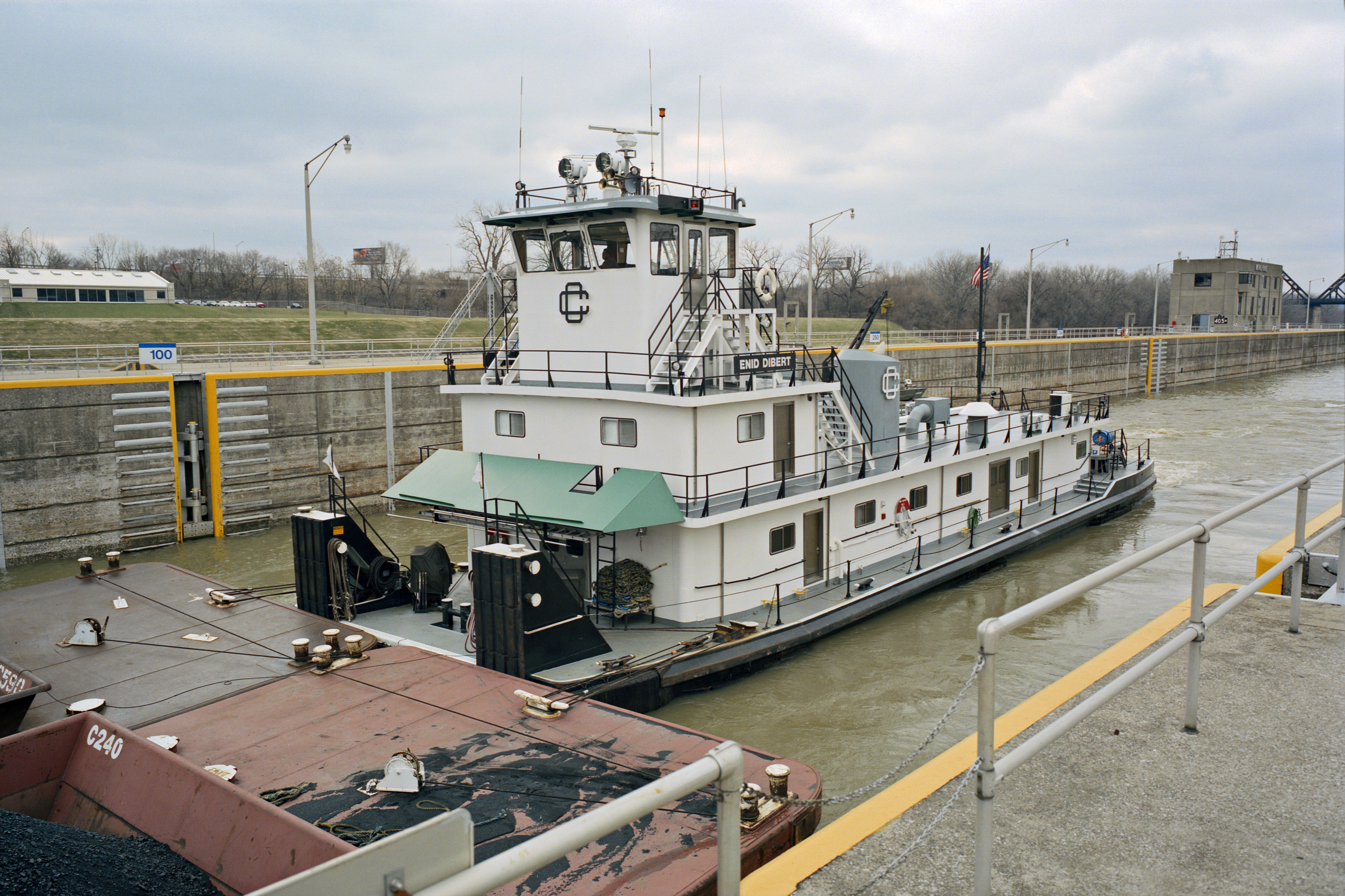
Towboat Enid Dibert departing main lock at McAlpine Locks on Ohio River, Louisville, Kentucky, USA, 1999

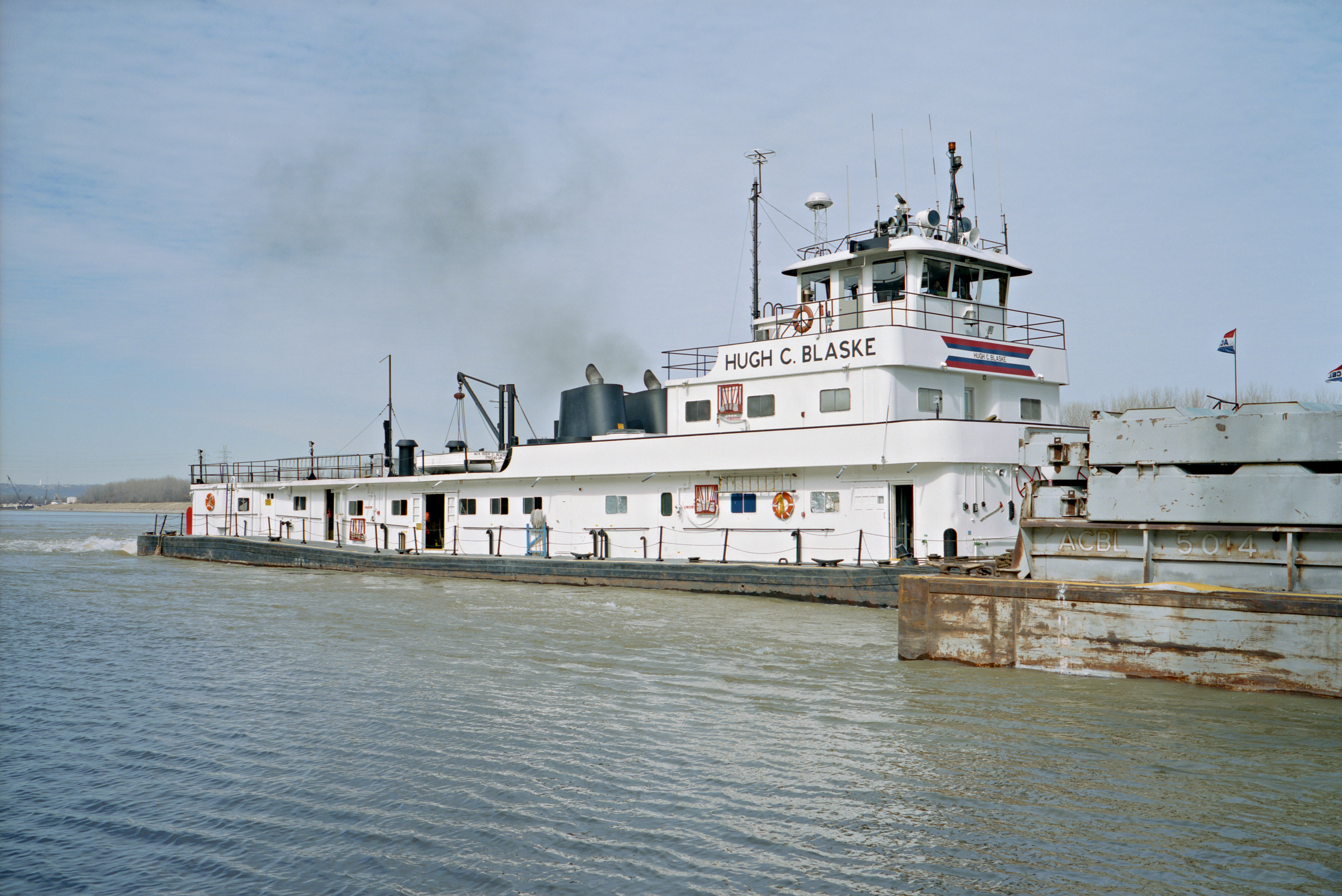
Towboat Hugh C. Blaske upbound in Portland Canal on Ohio River (1 of 2), Louisville, Kentucky, USA, 1999

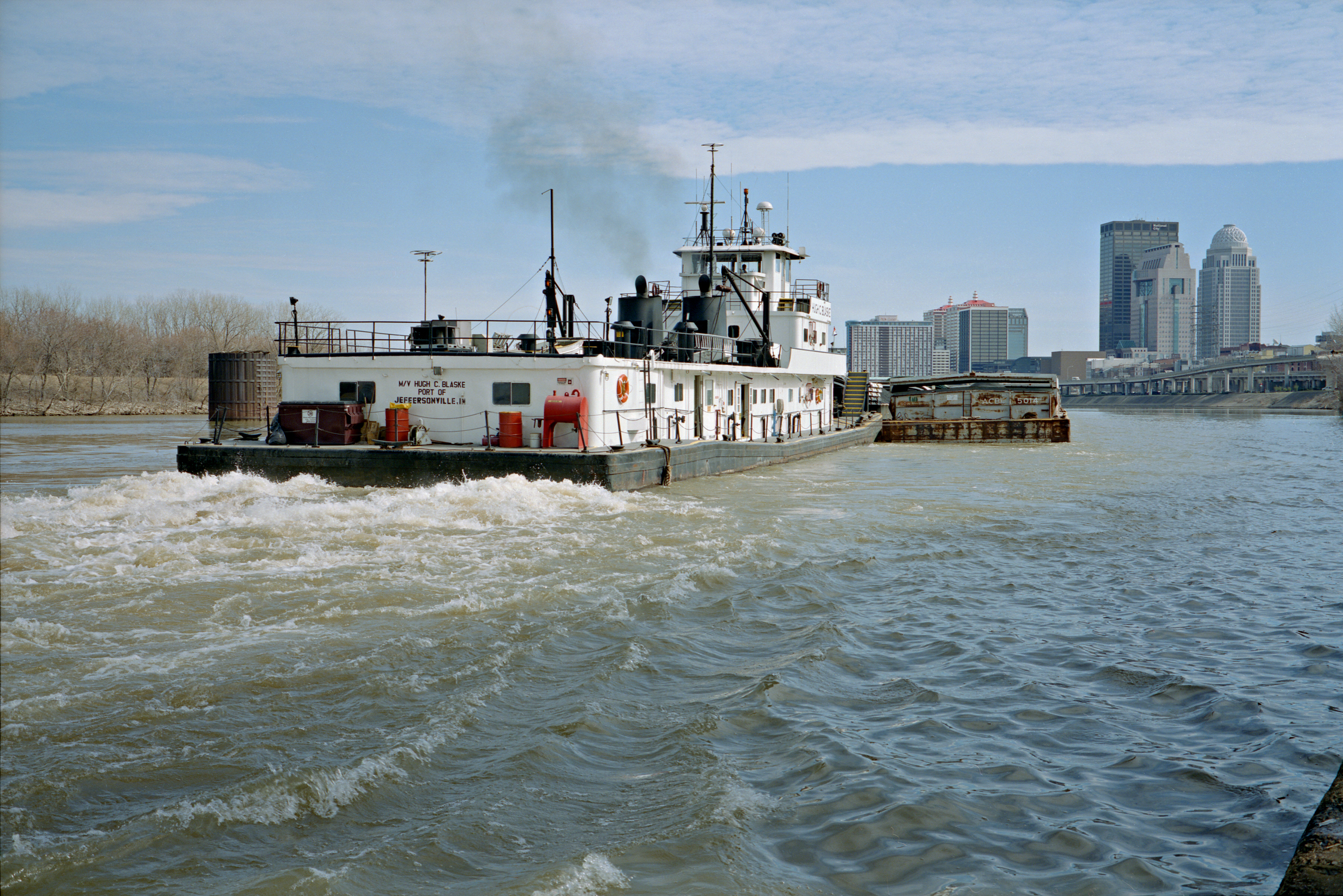
Towboat Hugh C. Blaske upbound in Portland Canal on Ohio River (2 of 2), Louisville, Kentucky, USA, 1999

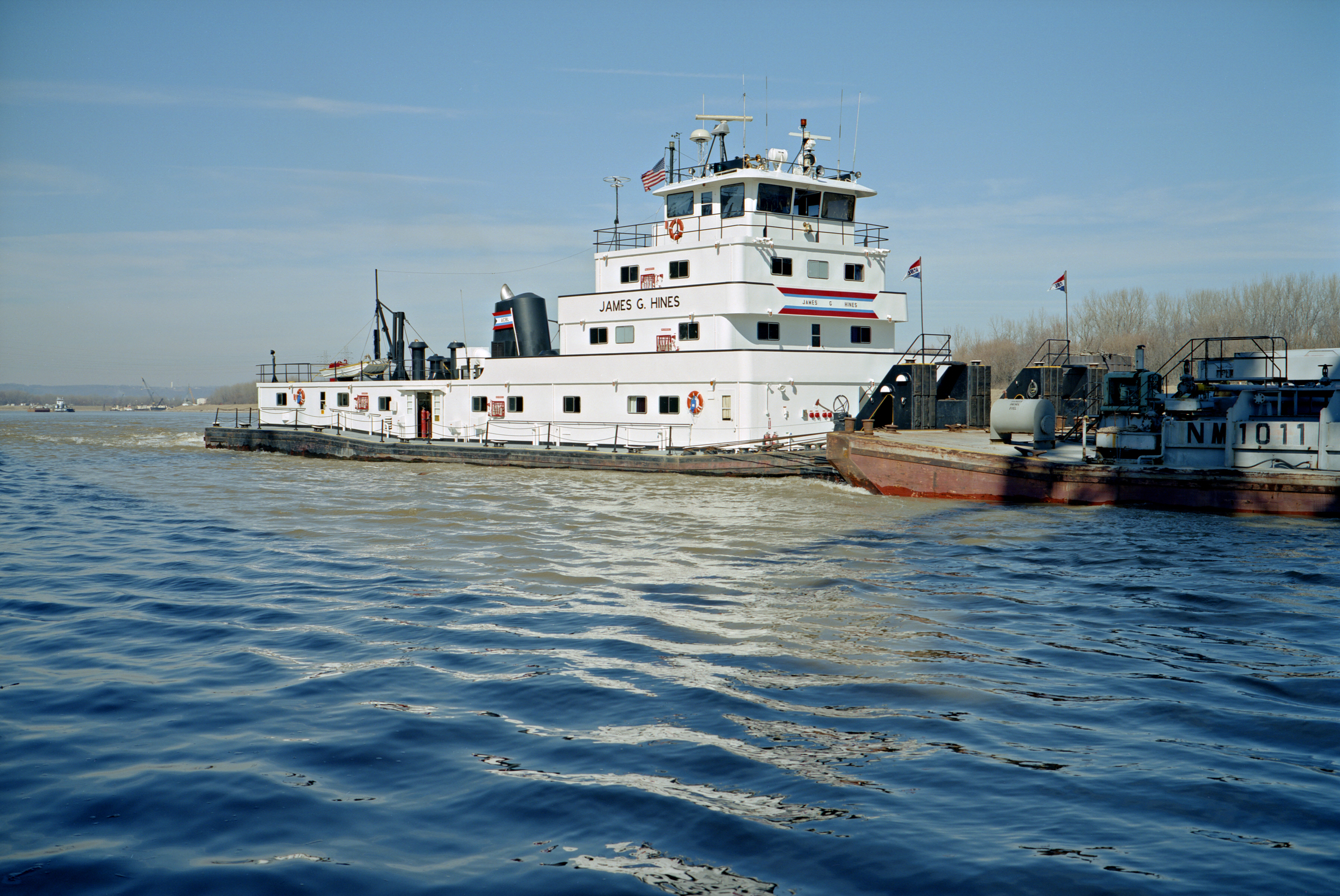
Towboat James G. Hines upbound in Portland Canal on Ohio River (1 of 2), Louisville, Kentucky, USA, 1999

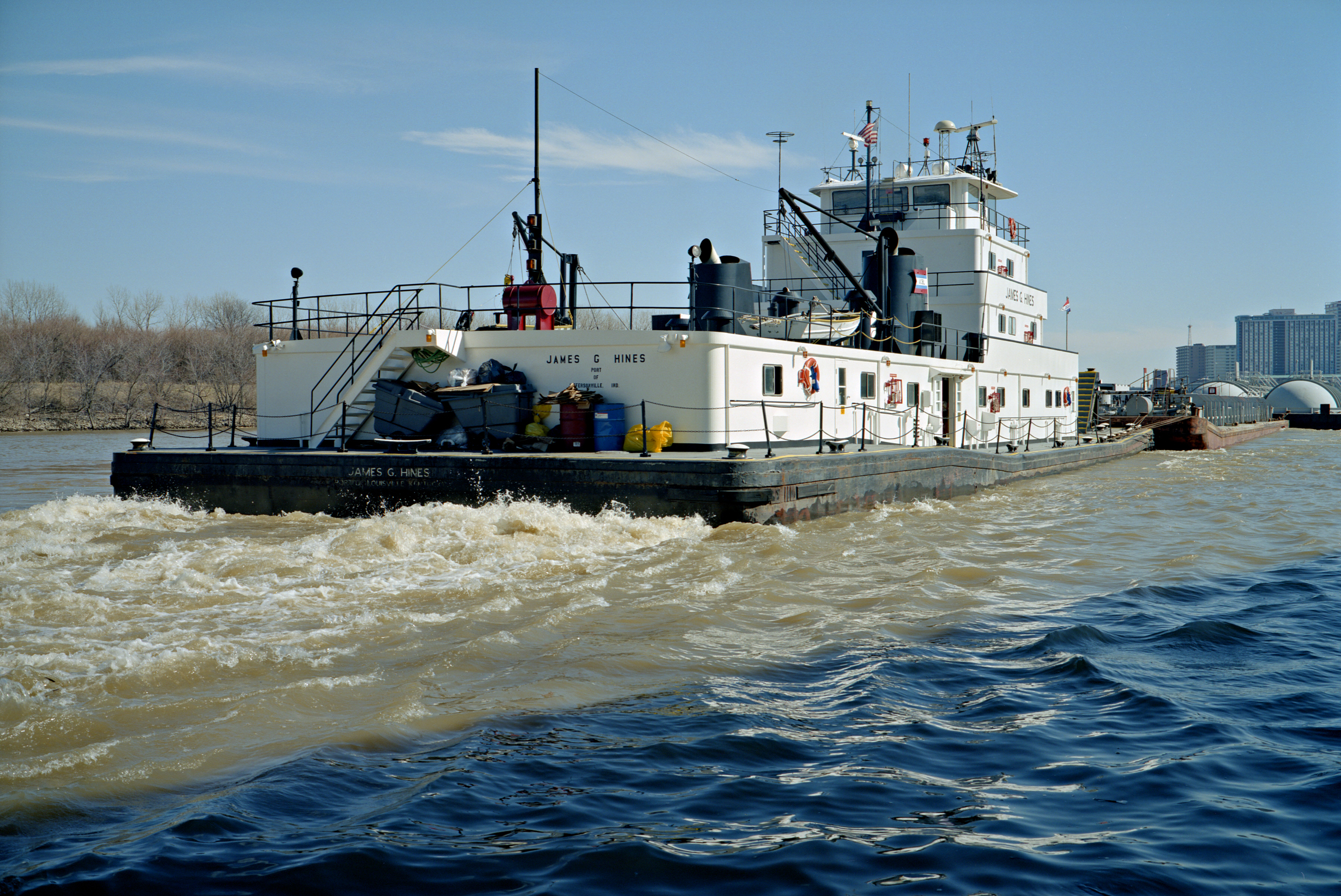
Towboat James G. Hines upbound in Portland Canal on Ohio River (2 of 2), Louisville, Kentucky, USA, 1999

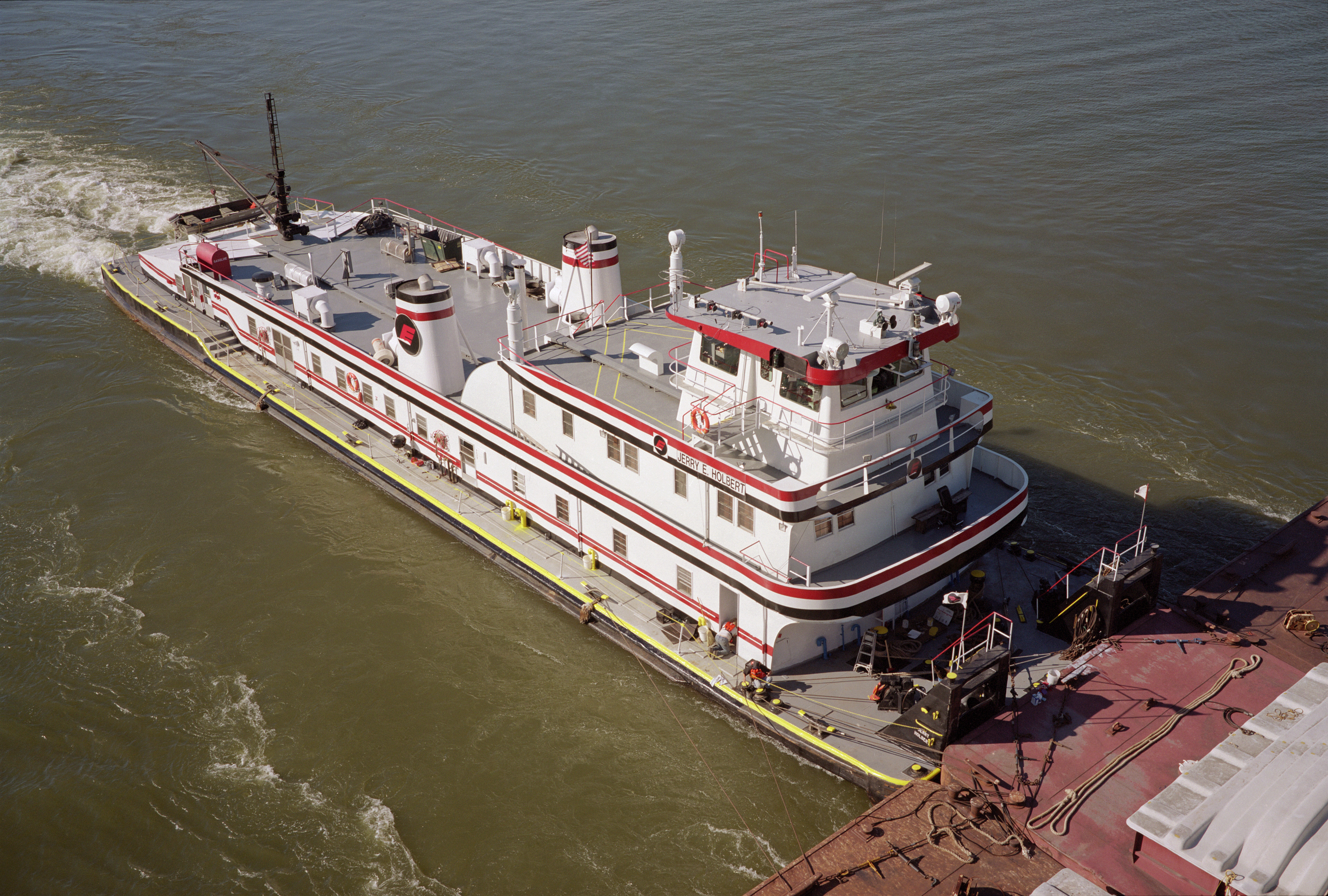
Towboat Jerry E. Holbert upbound on Ohio River at Clark Bridge, Louisville, Kentucky, USA, 2005

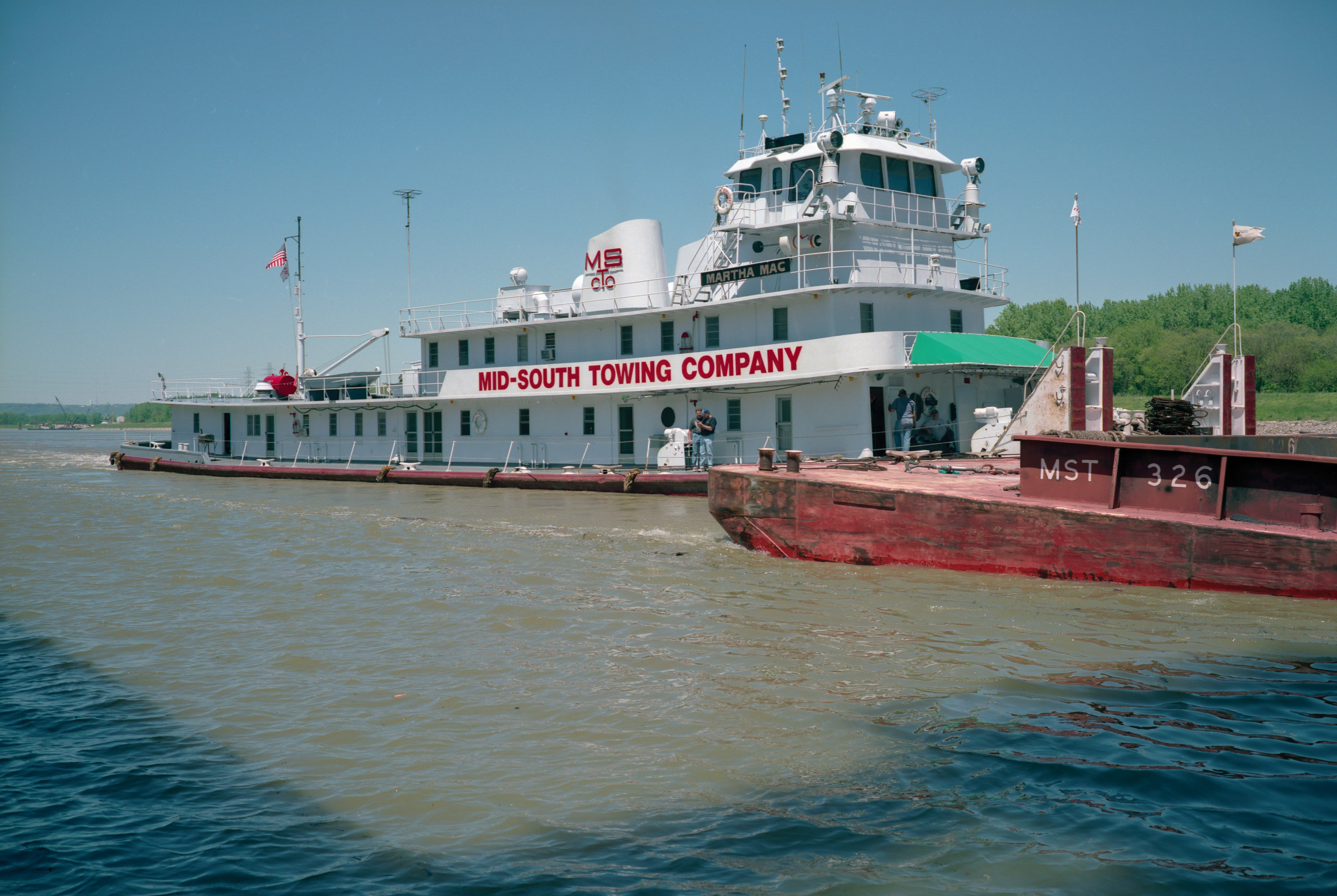
Towboat Martha Mac upbound in Portland Canal on Ohio River (1 of 2), Louisville, Kentucky, USA, 1999

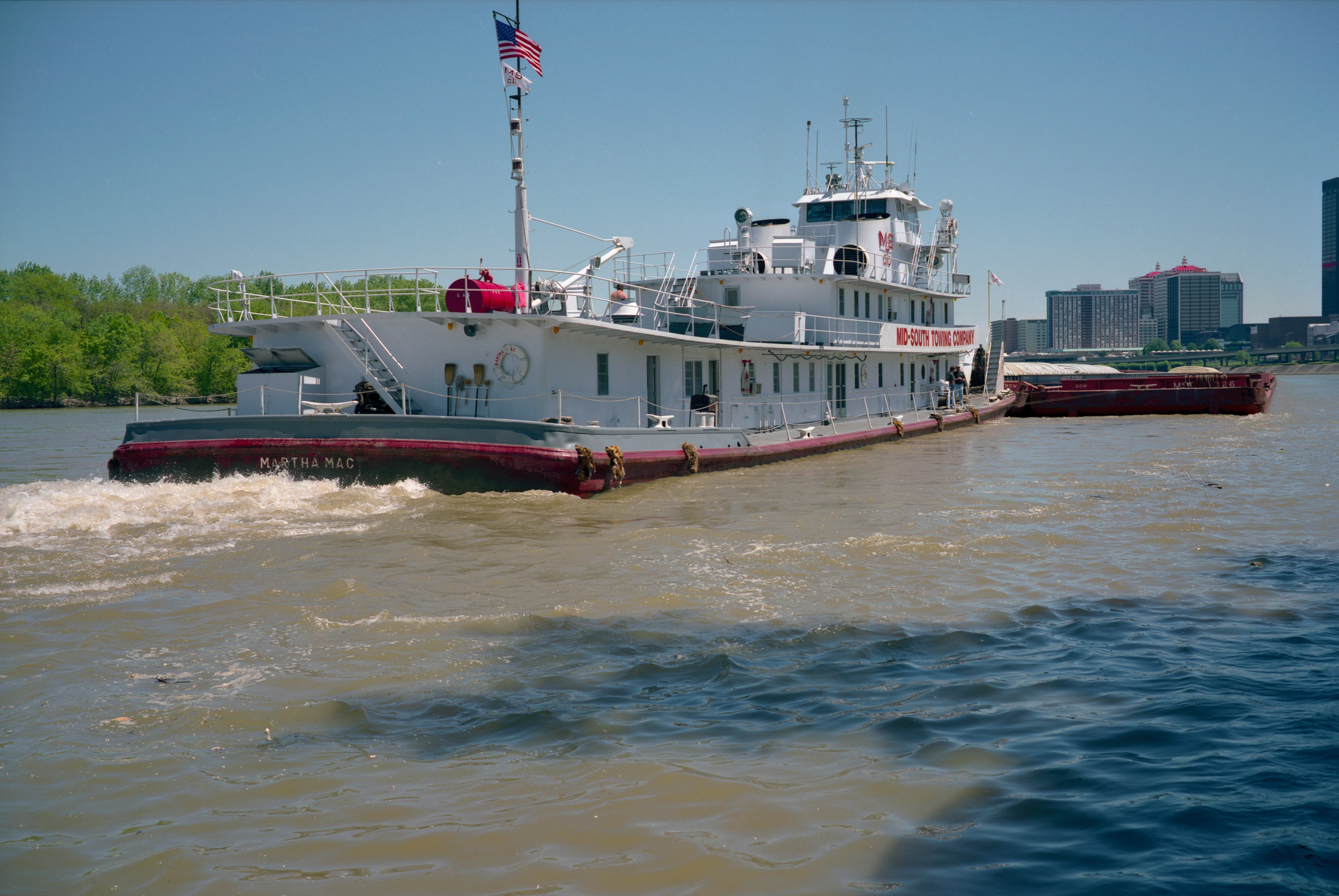
Towboat Martha Mac upbound in Portland Canal on Ohio River (2 of 2), Louisville, Kentucky, USA, 1999

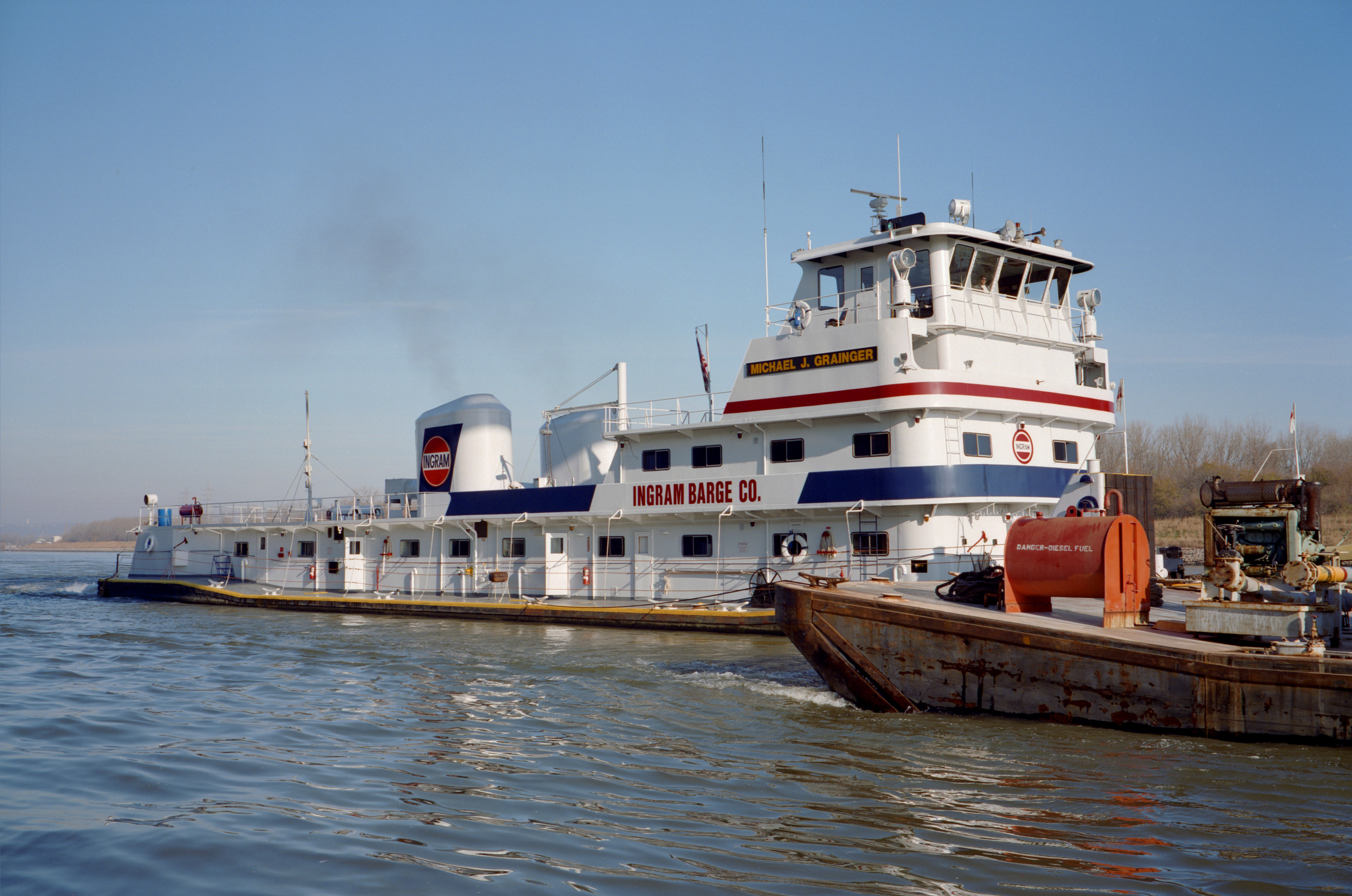
Towboat Michael J. Grainger upbound in Portland Canal on Ohio River, Louisville, Kentucky, USA, 1998

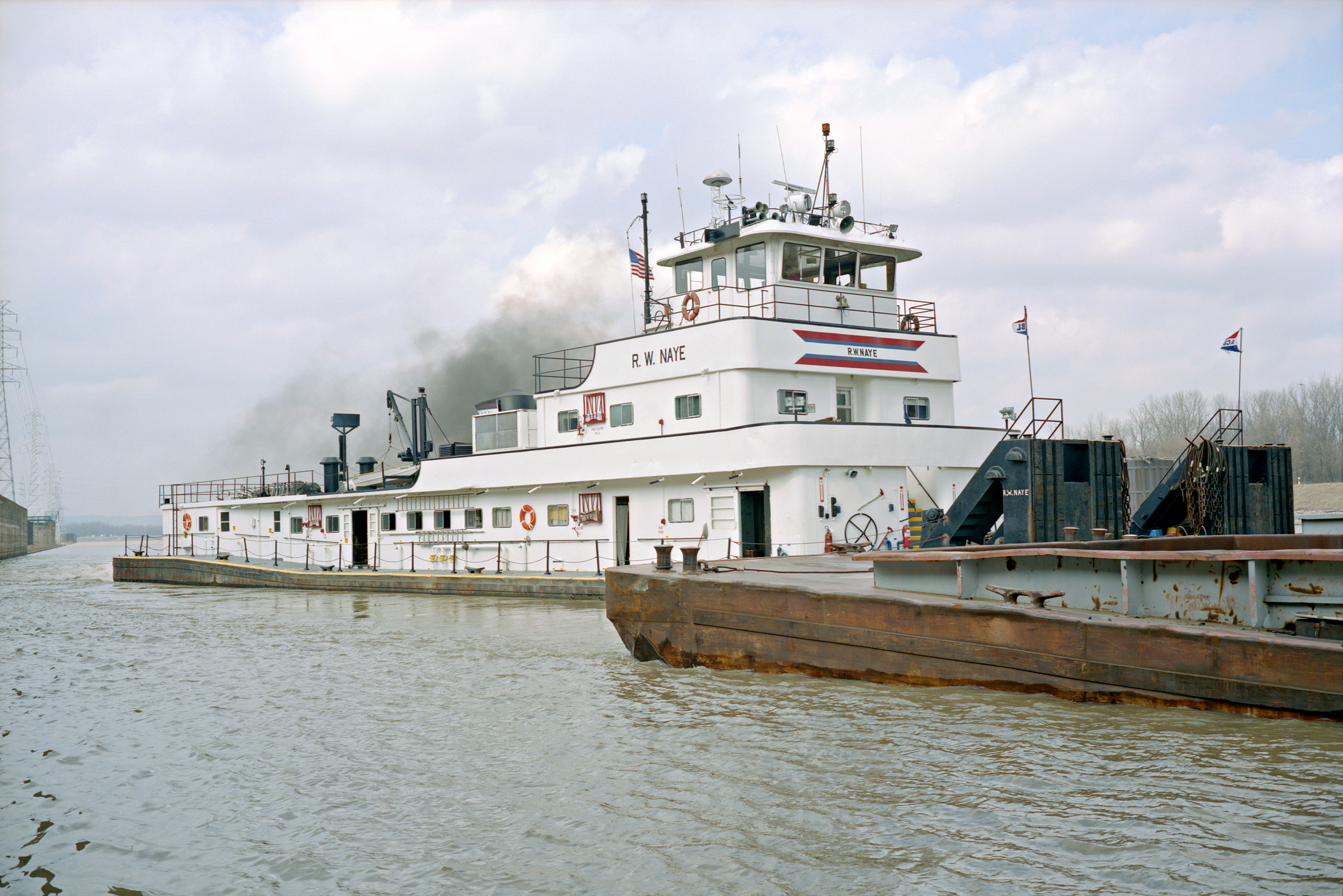
Towboat R. W. Naye upbound in Portland Canal on Ohio River (1 of 2), Louisville, Kentucky, USA, 1999

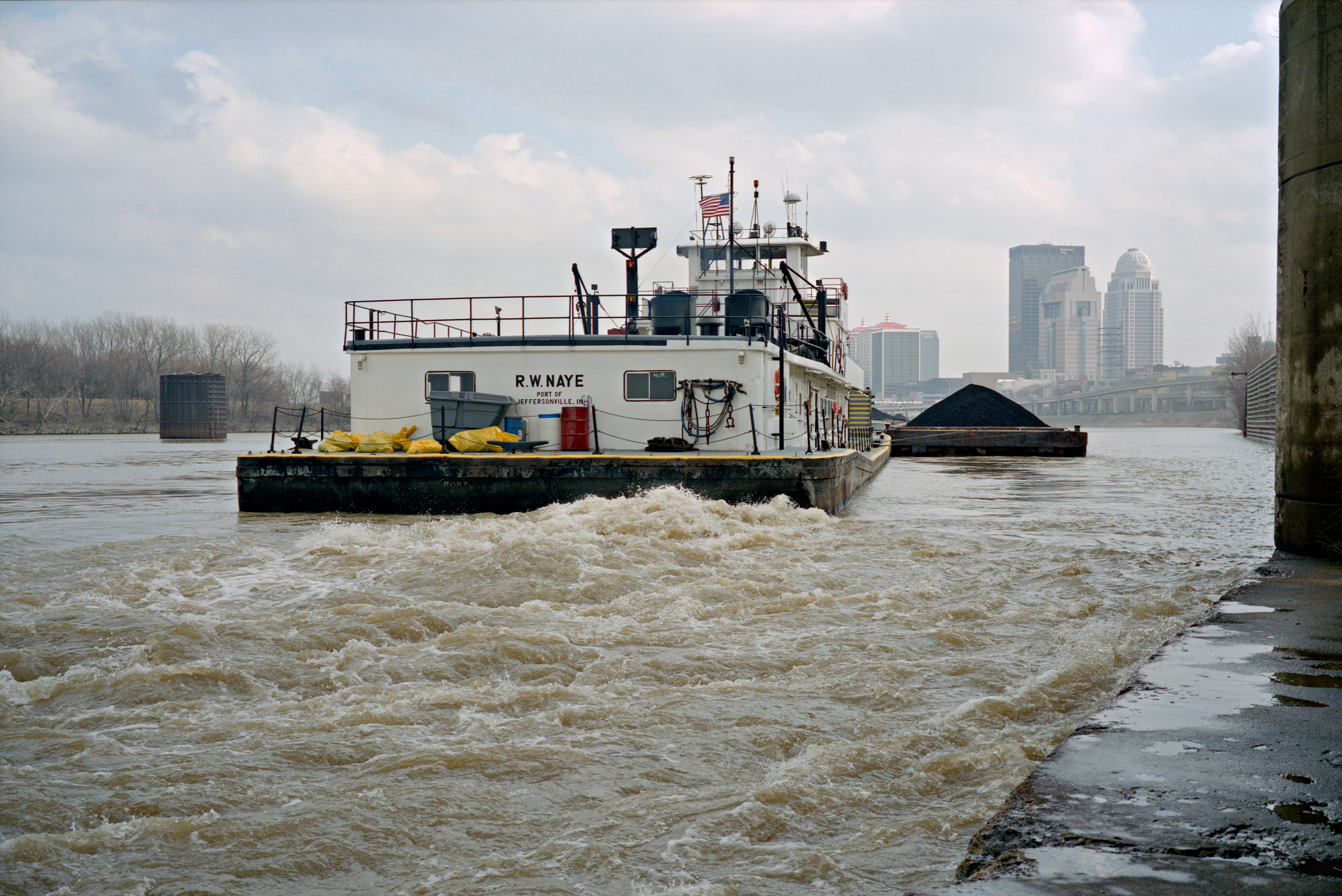
Towboat R. W. Naye upbound in Portland Canal on Ohio River (2 of 2), Louisville, Kentucky, USA, 1999

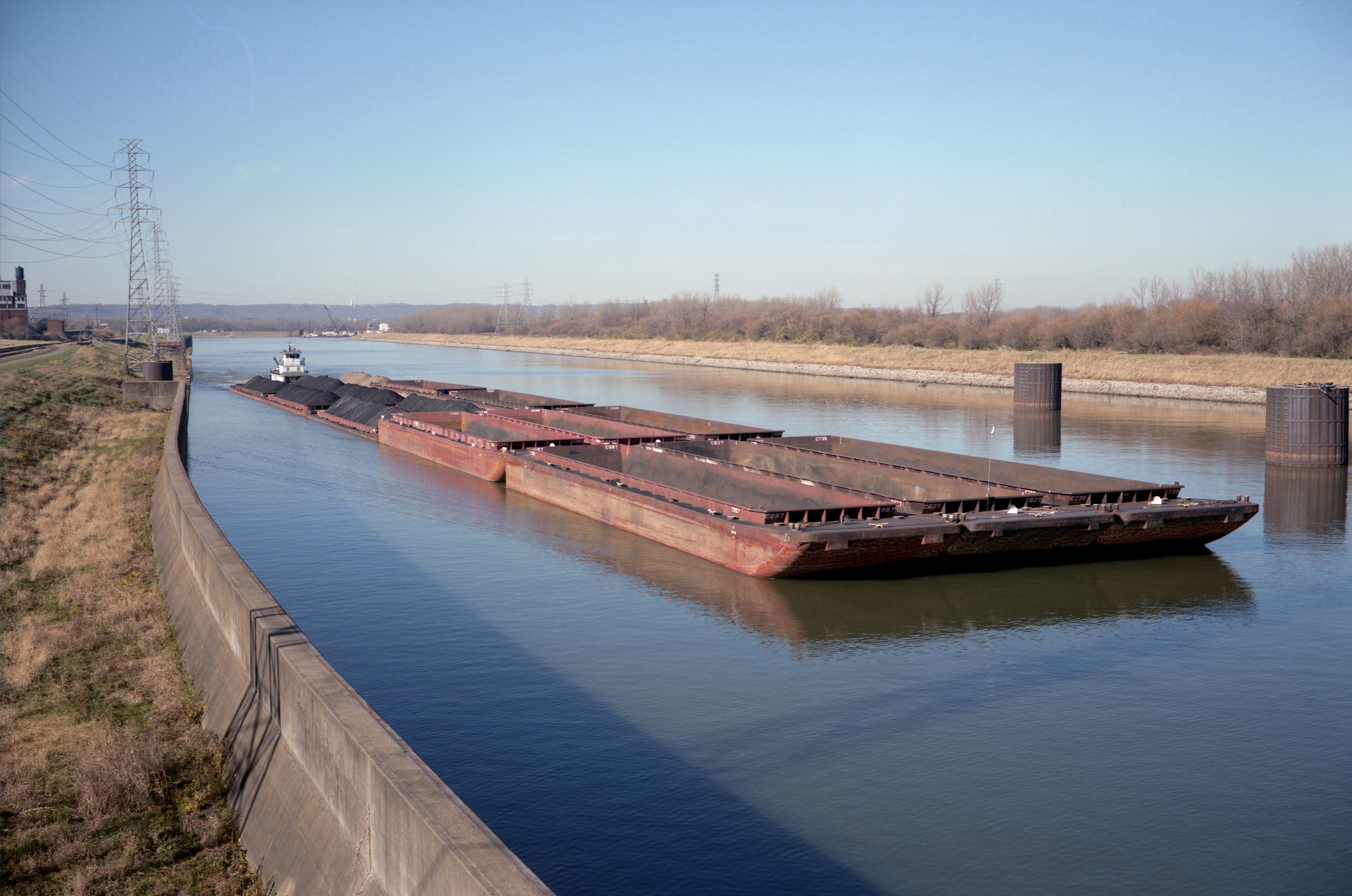
Towboat Sue Chappell upbound in Portland Canal on Ohio River (1 of 4), Louisville, Kentucky, USA, 1998

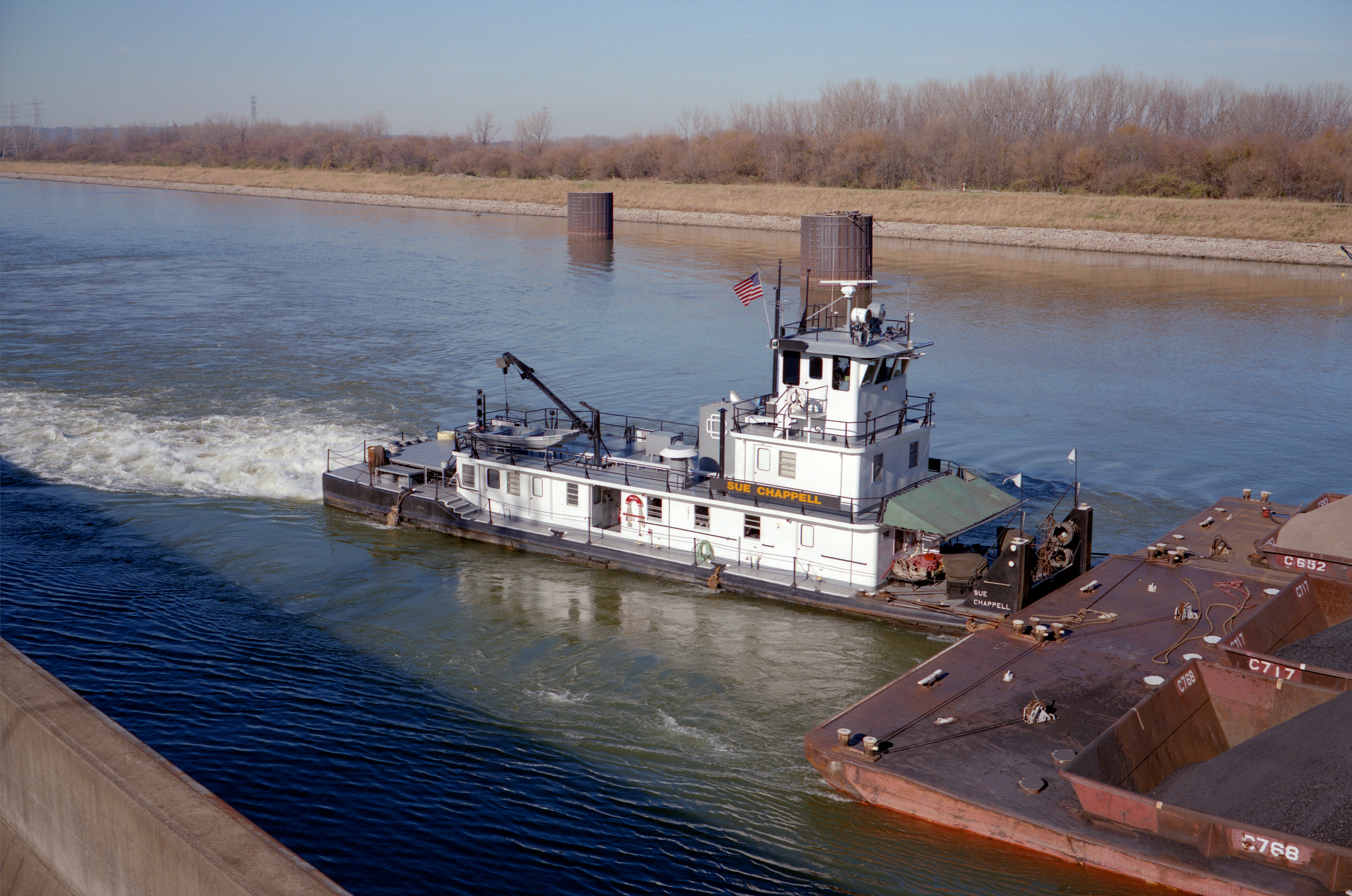
Towboat Sue Chappell upbound in Portland Canal on Ohio River (2 of 4), Louisville, Kentucky, USA, 1998

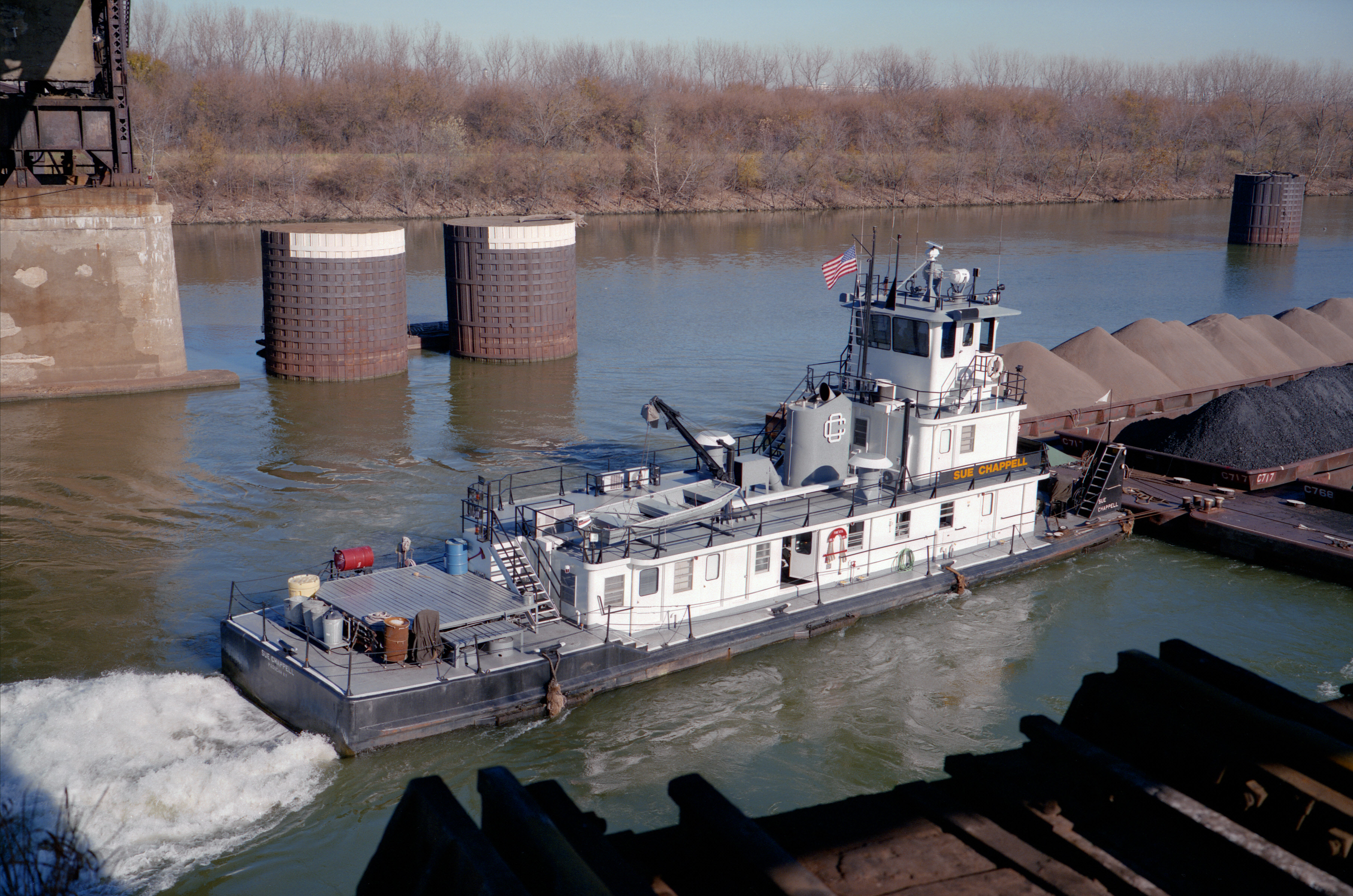
Towboat Sue Chappell upbound in Portland Canal on Ohio River (3 of 4), Louisville, Kentucky, USA, 1998

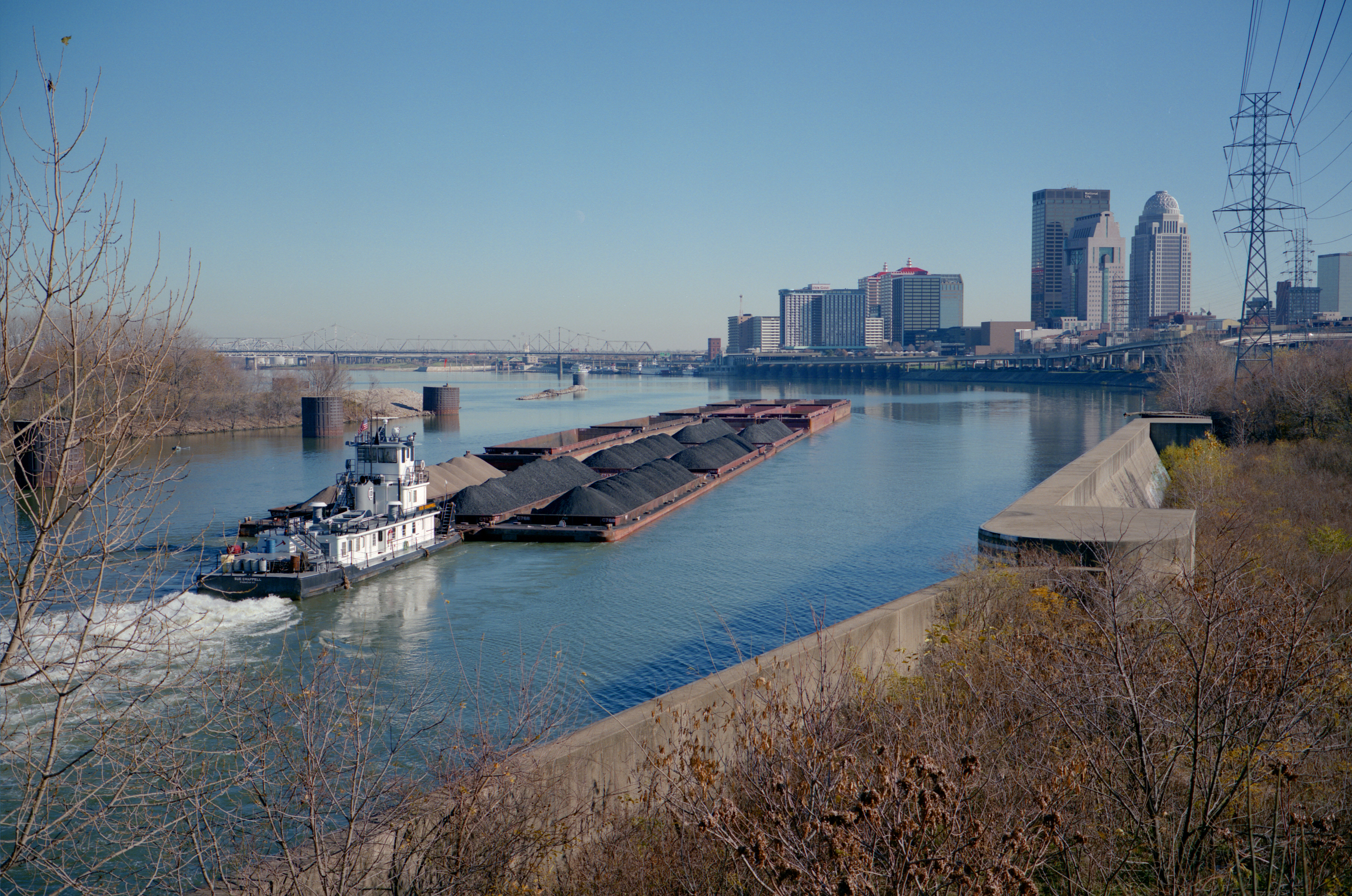
Towboat Sue Chappell upbound in Portland Canal on Ohio River (4 of 4), Louisville, Kentucky, USA, 1998

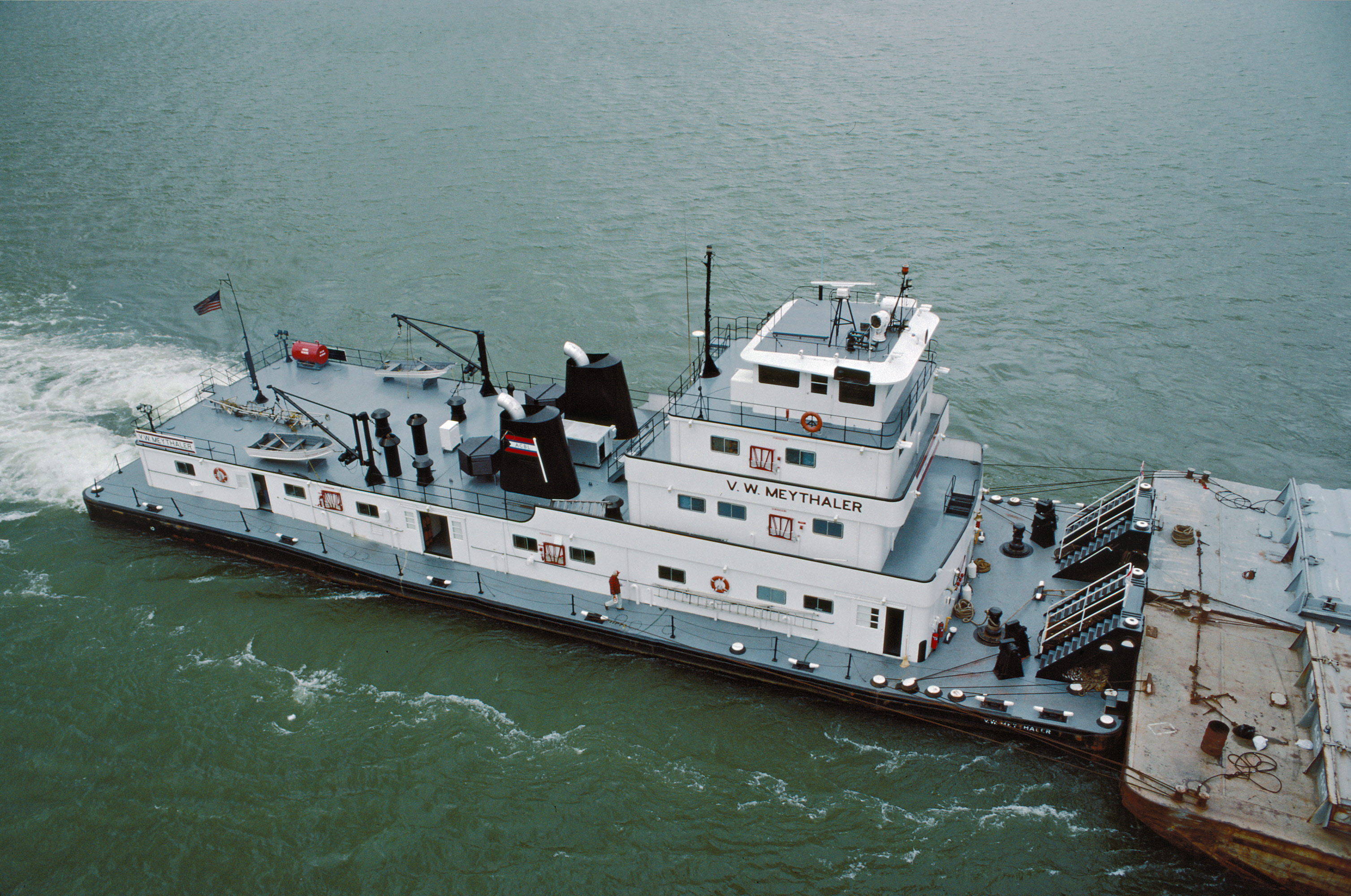
Towboat V.W. Meythaler upbound at Clark Bridge (1 of 2), Louisville, Kentucky, USA, 1987

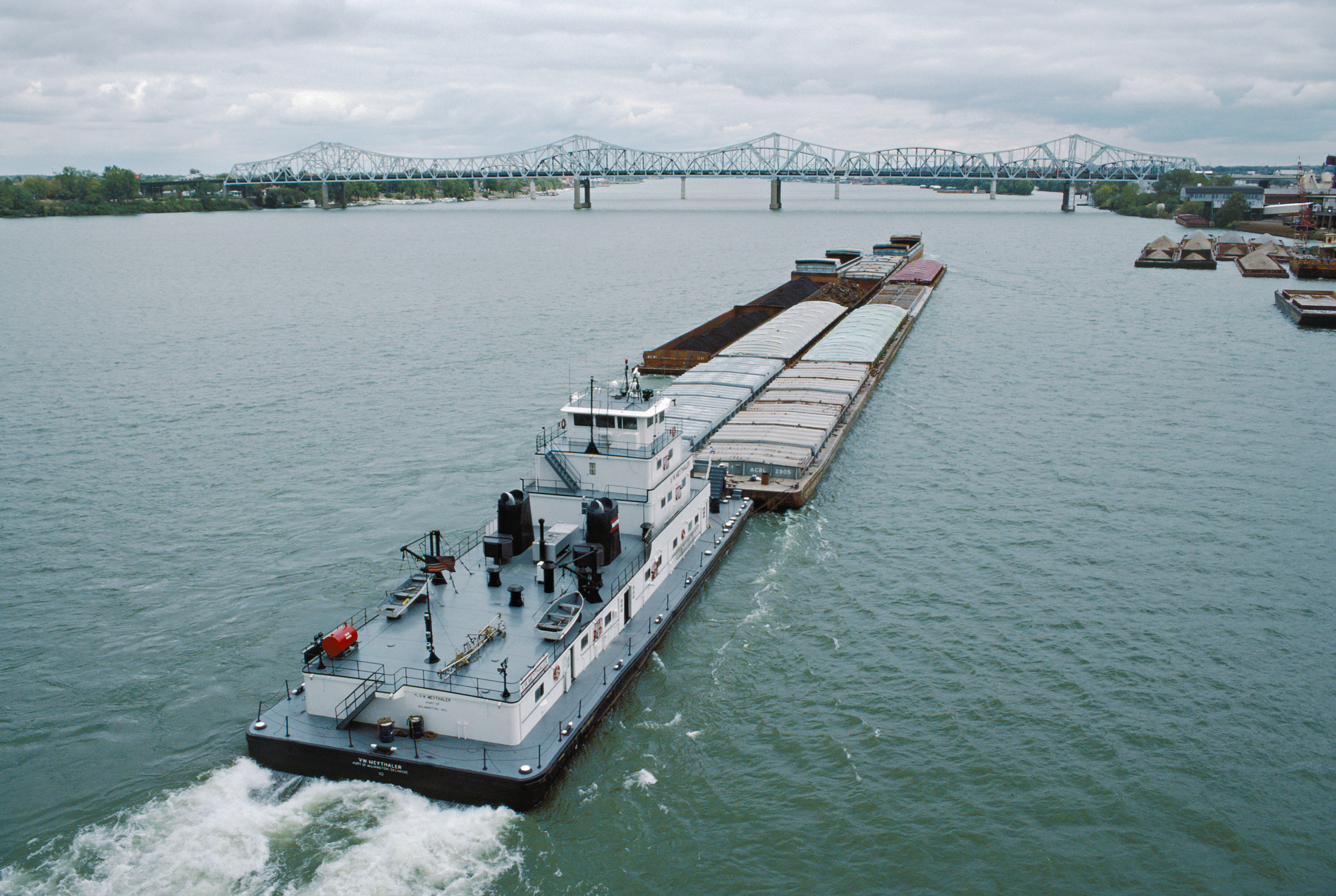
Towboat V.W. Meythaler upbound at Clark Bridge (2 of 2), Louisville, Kentucky, USA, 1987

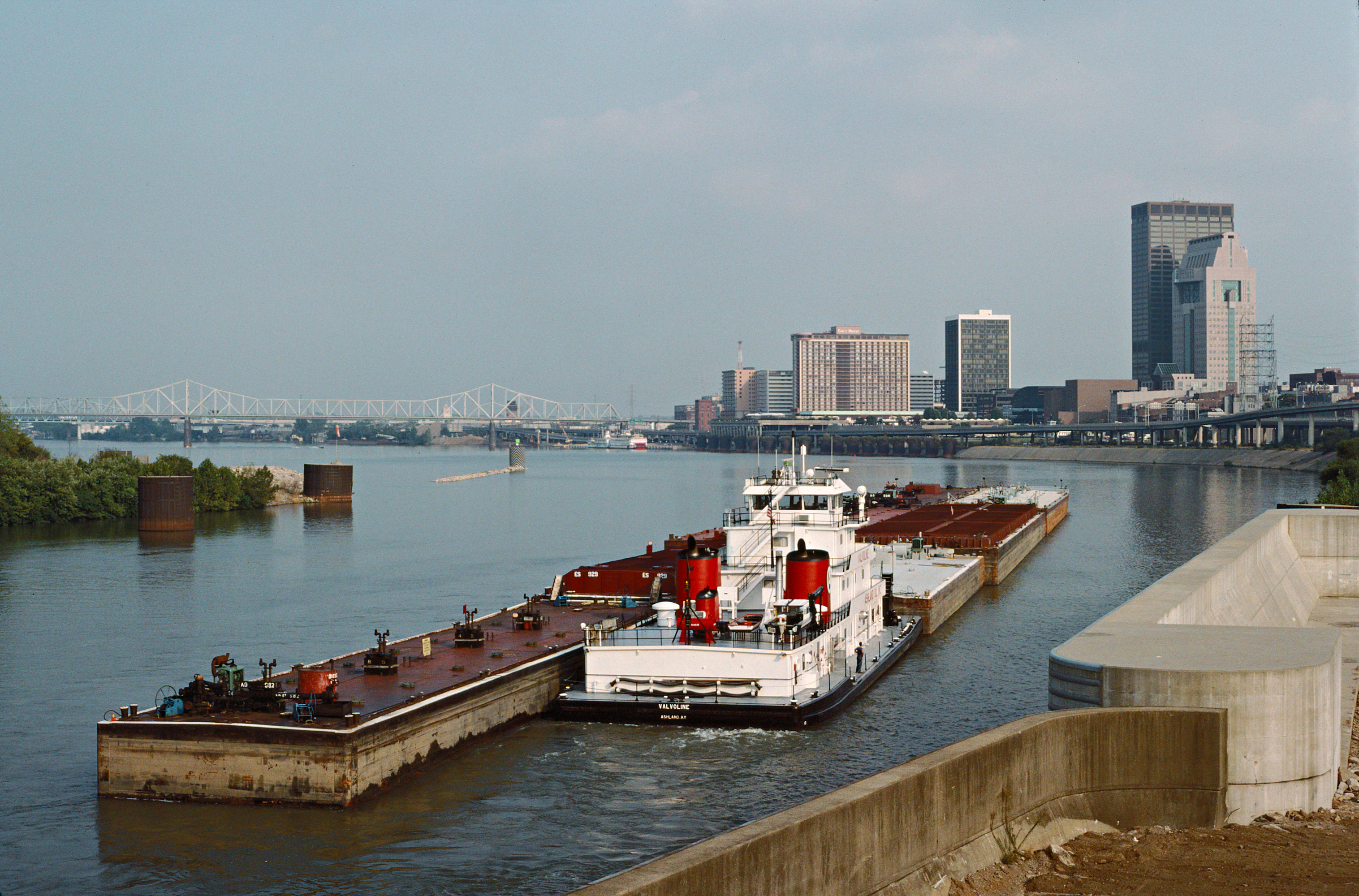
Towboat Valvoline upbound with empty tank barges in Portland Canal, Louisville, Kentucky, USA, 1987

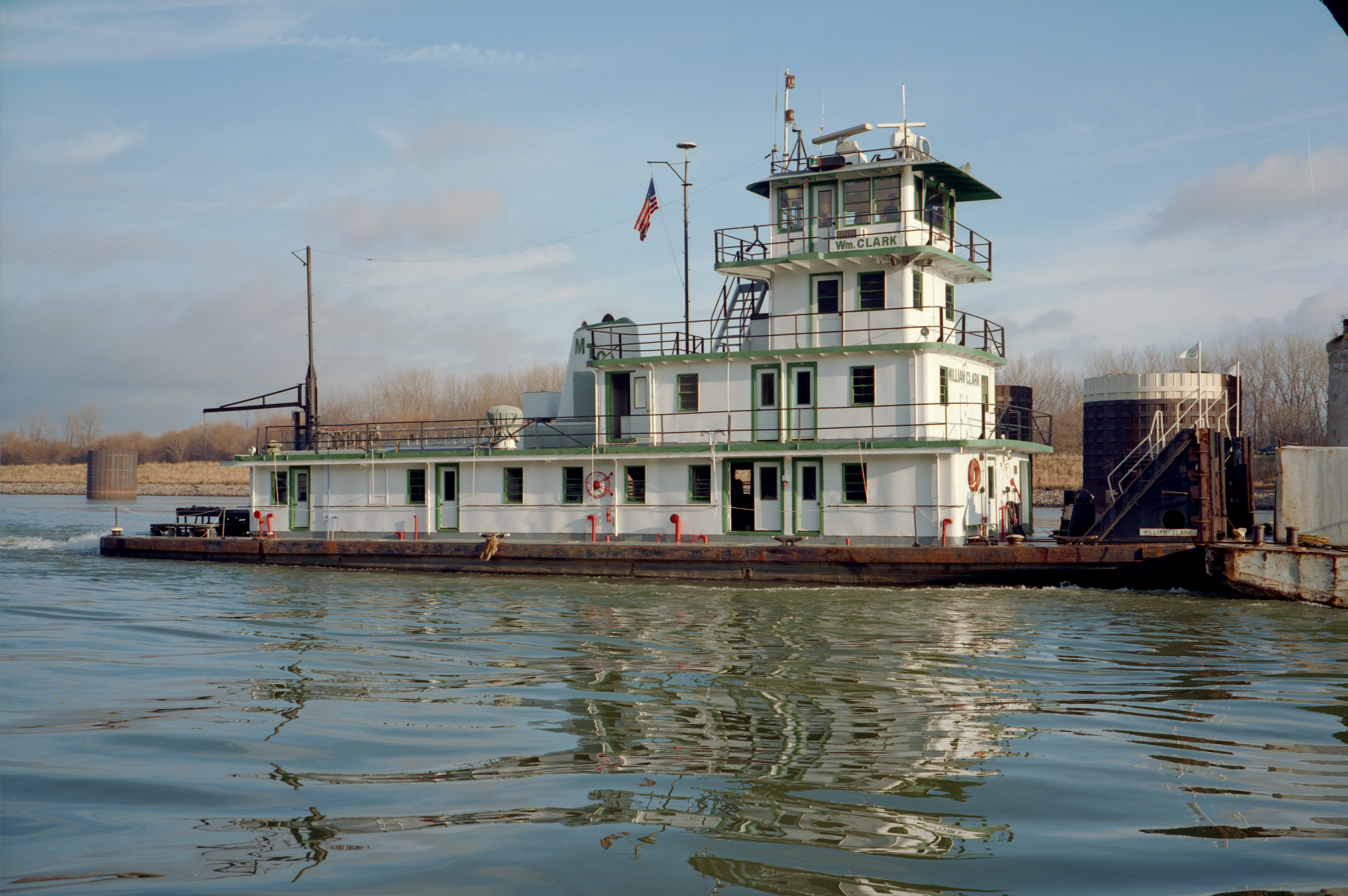
Towboat William Clark upbound in Portland Canal, Louisville, Kentucky, USA, 1998

== See also ==
- American Waterways Operators
- River cruise
- Riverboat
  - Paddle steamer
- Sampan
- Tugboat
