= Steamboat =

Boat, smaller than a steamship, using steam

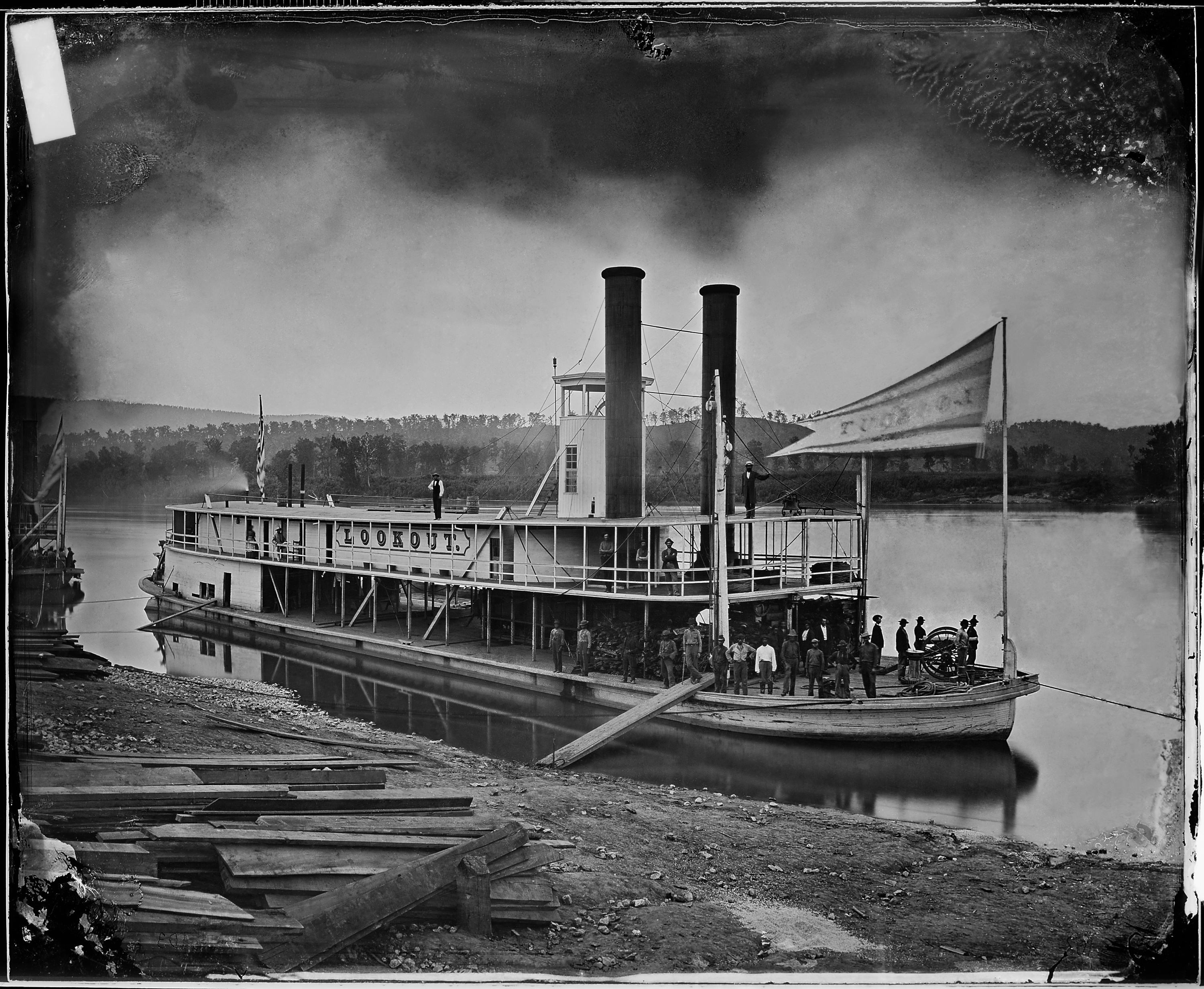
Lookout, transport steamer on the Tennessee River, c. 1860–1865

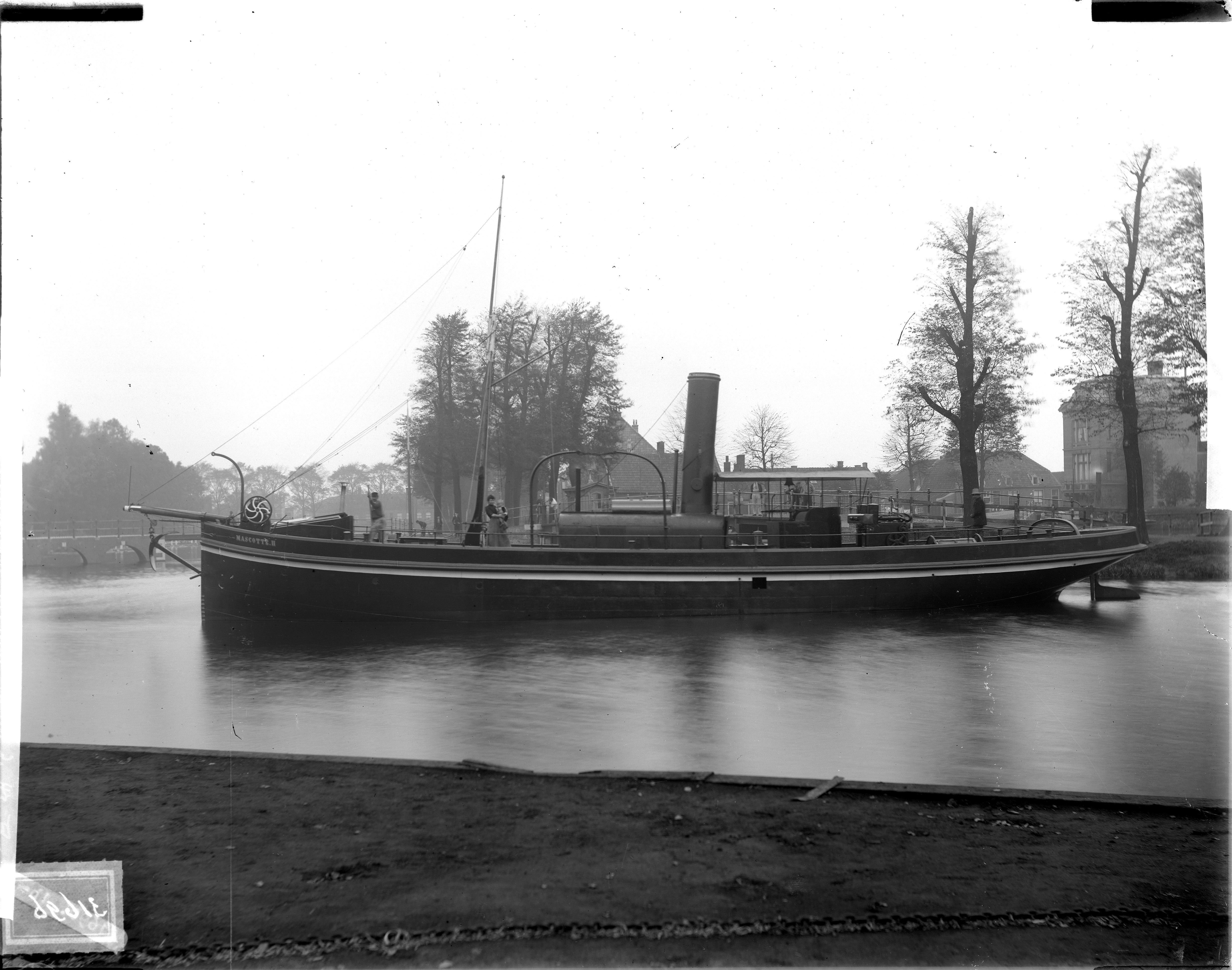
Dutch river steam-tugboat Mascotte II

A steamboat is a boat that is propelled primarily by steam power, typically driving propellers or paddlewheels. The term steamboat is used to refer to small steam-powered vessels working on lakes, rivers, and in short-sea shipping. The development of the steamboat led to the larger steamship, which is a seaworthy and often ocean-going ship.

Steamboats sometimes use the prefix designation SS, S.S. or S/S (for 'Screw Steamer') or PS (for 'Paddle Steamer'); however, these designations are most often used for steamships.

== Background ==
=== Limitations of the Newcomen steam engine ===
The first steamboat designs used Newcomen steam engines. These engines were large, heavy, and produced little power, which resulted in an unfavorable power-to-weight ratio. The heavy weight of the Newcomen engine required a structurally strong boat, and the reciprocating motion of the engine beam required a complicated mechanism to produce propulsion.

=== Rotary motion engines ===
James Watt's design improvements increased the efficiency of the steam engine, improving the power-to-weight ratio, and created an engine capable of rotary motion by using a double-acting cylinder which injected steam at each end of the piston stroke to move the piston back and forth. The rotary steam engine simplified the mechanism required to turn a paddle wheel to propel a boat. Despite the improved efficiency and rotary motion, the power-to-weight ratio of Boulton and Watt steam engine was still low.

=== High-pressure steam engines ===
The high-pressure steam engine was the development that made the steamboat practical. It had a high power-to-weight ratio and was fuel efficient. High pressure engines were made possible by improvements in the design of boilers and engine components so that they could withstand internal pressure, although boiler explosions were common due to lack of instrumentation like pressure gauges. Attempts at making high-pressure engines had to wait until the expiration of the Boulton and Watt patent in 1800. Shortly thereafter high-pressure engines by Richard Trevithick and Oliver Evans were introduced.

=== Compound or multiple expansion steam engines ===
The compound steam engine became widespread in the late 19th century. Compounding uses exhaust steam from a high pressure cylinder to a lower pressure cylinder and greatly improves efficiency. With compound engines it was possible for trans ocean steamers to carry less coal than freight. Compound steam engine powered ships enabled a great increase in international trade.

=== Steam turbines ===
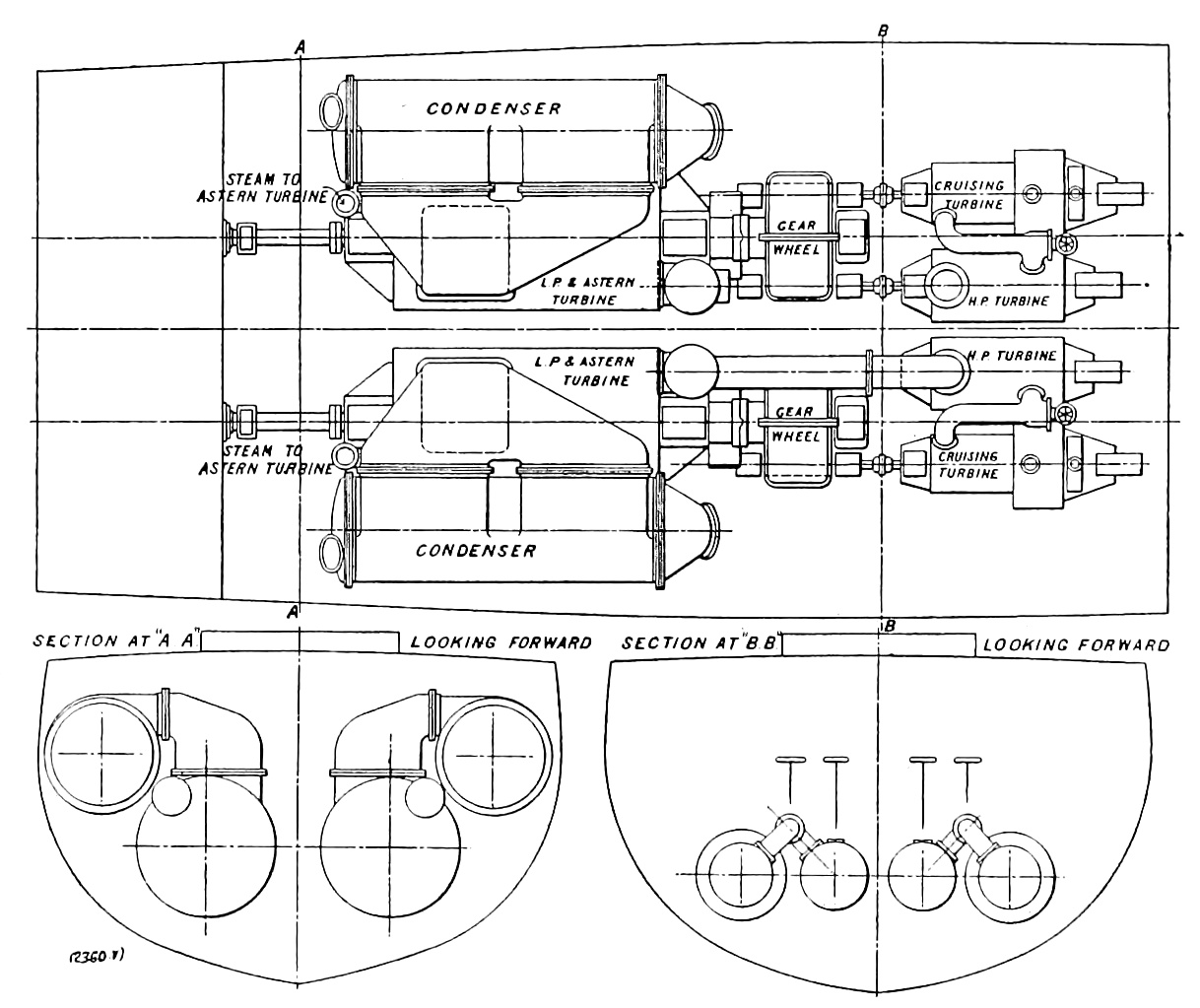
Steam turbine arrangement of a Twin Screw Torpedo Boat.

The most efficient steam engine used for marine propulsion is the steam turbine. It was developed near the end of the 19th century and was used throughout the 20th century.

== History ==
=== Early designs ===
An apocryphal story from 1851 attributes the earliest steamboat to Denis Papin for a boat he built in 1705. Papin was an early innovator in steam power and the inventor of the steam digester, the first pressure cooker, which played an important role in James Watt's steam experiments. However, Papin's boat was not steam-powered but powered by hand-cranked paddles.

A steamboat was described and patented by English physician John Allen in 1729. In 1736, Jonathan Hulls was granted a patent in England for a Newcomen engine-powered steamboat (using a pulley instead of a beam, and a pawl and ratchet to obtain rotary motion), but it was the improvement in steam engines by James Watt that made the concept feasible. William Henry of Lancaster, Pennsylvania, having learned of Watt's engine on a visit to England, made his own engine, and put it in a boat. The boat sank, and while Henry made an improved model, he did not appear to have much success, though he may have inspired others.

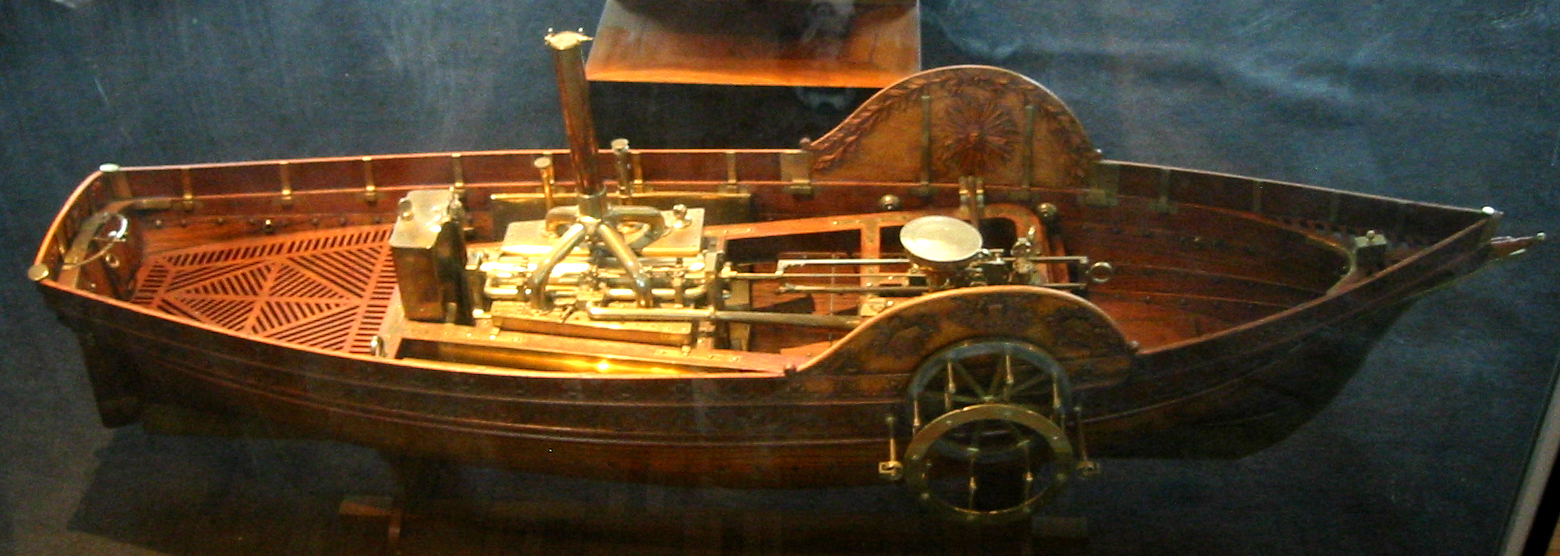
Model of the steamship built in 1784 by Claude de Jouffroy.

The first steam-powered ship, Pyroscaphe, was a paddle steamer powered by a double-acting steam engine; it was built in France in 1783 by Marquis Claude de Jouffroy and his colleagues as an improvement of an earlier attempt, the 1776 Palmipède. At its first demonstration on 15 July 1783, Pyroscaphe travelled upstream on the river Saône for some fifteen minutes before the engine failed. Presumably this was easily repaired as the boat is said to have made several such journeys. Following this, De Jouffroy attempted to get the government interested in his work, but for political reasons was instructed that he would have to build another version on the Seine in Paris. De Jouffroy did not have the funds for this, and, following the events of the French revolution, work on the project was discontinued after he left the country.

Similar boats were made in 1785 by John Fitch in Philadelphia and William Symington in Dumfries, Scotland. Fitch successfully trialled his boat in 1787, and in 1788, he began operating a regular commercial service along the Delaware River between Philadelphia and Burlington, New Jersey, carrying as many as 30 passengers. This boat could typically make 7 to 8 miles per hour (11 to 13 km/h) and travelled more than 2,000 miles (3,200 km) during its short length of service. The Fitch steamboat was not a commercial success, as this travel route was adequately covered by relatively good wagon roads. The following year, a second boat made 30-mile (48 km) excursions, and in 1790, a third boat ran a series of trials on the Delaware River before patent disputes dissuaded Fitch from continuing.

Meanwhile, Patrick Miller of Dalswinton, near Dumfries, Scotland, had developed double-hulled boats propelled by manually cranked paddle wheels placed between the hulls, even attempting to interest various European governments in a giant warship version, 246 feet (75 m) long. Miller sent King Gustav III of Sweden an actual small-scale version, 100 feet (30 m) long, called Experiment. Miller then engaged engineer William Symington to build his patent steam engine that drove a stern-mounted paddle wheel in a boat in 1785. The boat was successfully tried out on Dalswinton Loch in 1788 and was followed by a larger steamboat the next year. Miller then abandoned the project.

=== 19th century ===
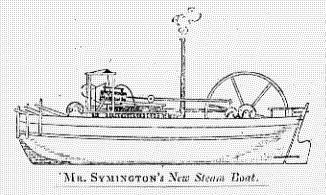
Charlotte Dundas, built by William Symington.

The failed project of Patrick Miller caught the attention of Lord Dundas, Governor of the Forth and Clyde Canal Company, and at a meeting with the canal company's directors on 5 June 1800, they approved his proposals for the use of "a model of a boat by Captain Schank to be worked by a steam engine by Mr Symington" on the canal.

The boat was built by Alexander Hart at Grangemouth to Symington's design with a vertical cylinder engine and crosshead transmitting power to a crank driving the paddlewheels. Trials on the River Carron in June 1801 were successful and included towing sloops from the river Forth up the Carron and thence along the Forth and Clyde Canal.

In 1801, Symington patented a horizontal steam engine directly linked to a crank. He got support from Lord Dundas to build a second steamboat, which became famous as the Charlotte Dundas, named in honour of Lord Dundas's daughter. Symington designed a new hull around his powerful horizontal engine, with the crank driving a large paddle wheel in a central upstand in the hull, aimed at avoiding damage to the canal banks. The new boat was 56 ft (17.1 m) long, 18 ft (5.5 m) wide and 8 ft (2.4 m) depth, with a wooden hull. The boat was built by John Allan and the engine by the Carron Company.

The first sailing was on the canal in Glasgow on 4 January 1803, with Lord Dundas and a few of his relatives and friends on board. The crowd were pleased with what they saw, but Symington wanted to make improvements and another more ambitious trial was made on 28 March. On this occasion, the Charlotte Dundas towed two 70 ton barges 30 km (almost 20 miles) along the Forth and Clyde Canal to Glasgow, and despite "a strong breeze right ahead" that stopped all other canal boats it took only nine and a quarter hours, giving an average speed of about 3 km/h (2 mph). The Charlotte Dundas was the first practical steamboat, in that it demonstrated the practicality of steam power for ships, and was the first to be followed by continuous development of steamboats.

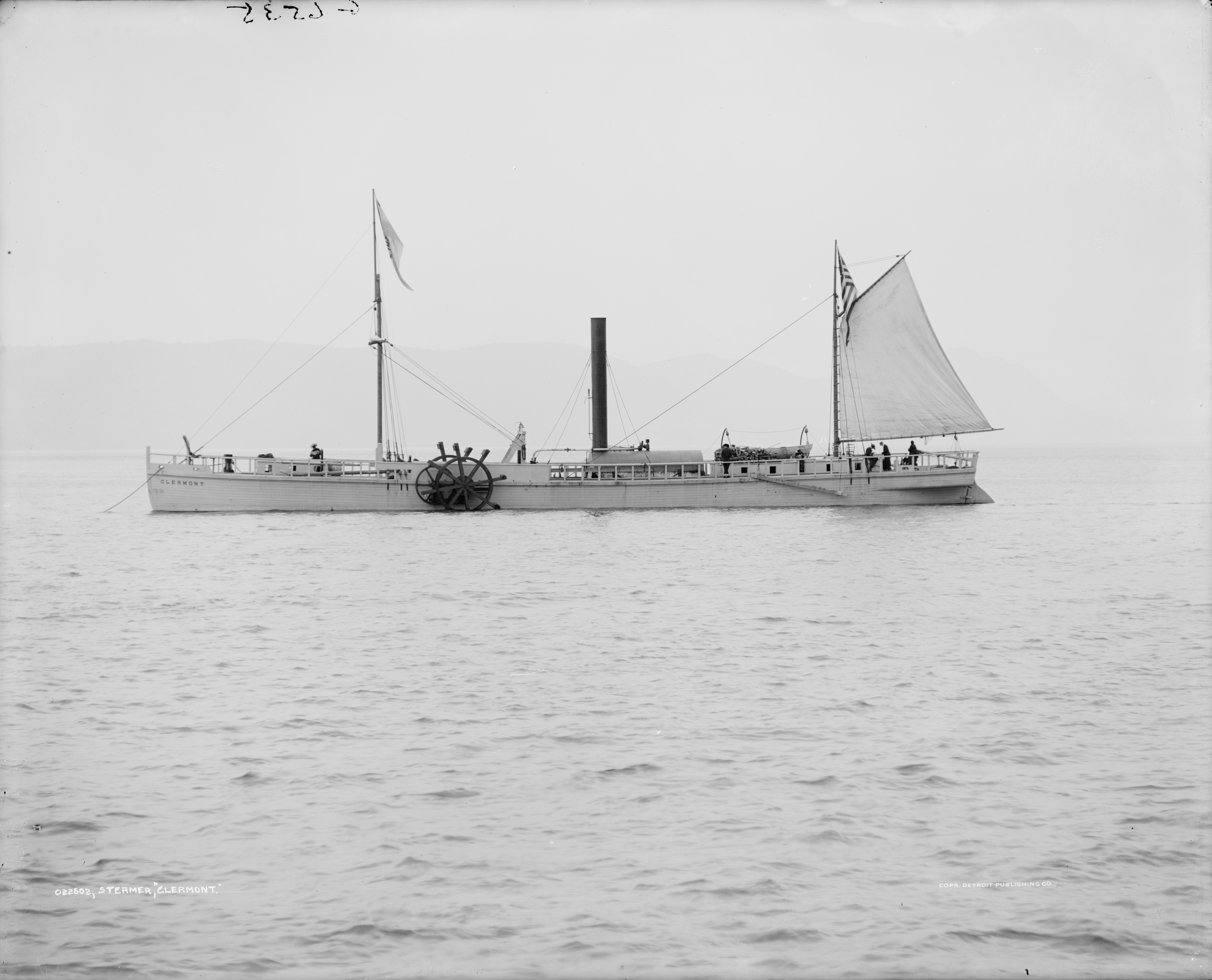
The 1909 replica of the North River Steamboat, the first steamboat to achieve commercial success transporting passengers along the Hudson River.

The American Robert Fulton was present at the trials of the Charlotte Dundas and was intrigued by the potential of the steamboat. While working in France, he corresponded with and was helped by the Scottish engineer Henry Bell, who may have given him the first model of his working steamboat. Fulton designed his own steamboat, which sailed along the River Seine in 1803.

In May 1804, John Stevens would design and build a steamboat named the Little Juliana after his eldest daughter Juliana, it was the first powered vessel with a screw propeller propulsion system.

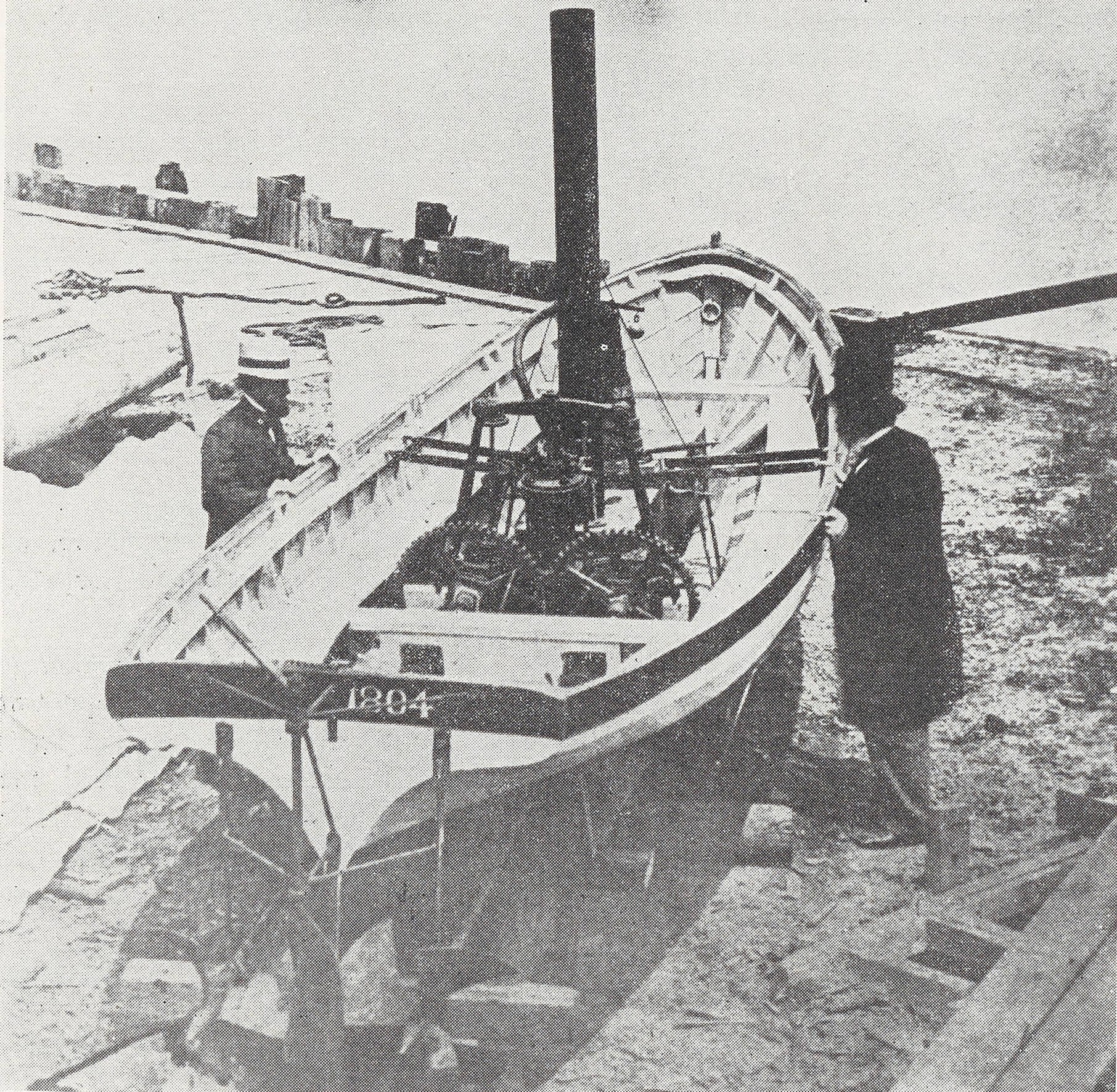
Model of Colonel Stevens 1804 "Little Juliana" steamboat circa 1952.

Fulton later obtained a Boulton and Watt steam engine, shipped to America, where his first proper steamship was built in 1807, North River Steamboat (later known as Clermont), which carried passengers between New York City and Albany, New York. Clermont was able to make the 150-mile (240 km) trip in 32 hours. The steamboat was powered by a Boulton and Watt engine and was capable of long-distance travel. It was the first commercially successful steamboat, transporting passengers along the Hudson River.

In 1807 Robert L. Stevens began operation of the Phoenix, which used a high-pressure engine in combination with a low-pressure condensing engine. The first steamboats powered only by high pressure were the Aetna and Pennsylvania, designed and built by Oliver Evans.

In October 1811 a ship designed by John Stevens, Juliana, would operate as the first steam-powered ferry between Hoboken and New York City. Stevens' ship was engineered as a twin-screw-driven steamboat in juxtaposition to Clermont's Boulton and Watt engine. The design was a modification of Stevens' prior paddle steamer Phoenix, the first steamship to successfully navigate the open ocean in its route from Hoboken to Philadelphia.

In 1812, Henry Bell's PS Comet was inaugurated. The steamboat was the first commercial passenger service in Europe and sailed along the River Clyde in Scotland.

The Margery, launched in Dumbarton in 1814, in January 1815 became the first steamboat on the River Thames, much to the amazement of Londoners. She operated a London-to-Gravesend river service until 1816, when she was sold to the French and became the first steamboat to cross the English Channel. When she reached Paris, the new owners renamed her Elise and inaugurated a Seine steamboat service.

In 1818, Ferdinando I, the first Italian steamboat, left the port of Naples, where it had been built.

=== Sea- and Ocean-going ===
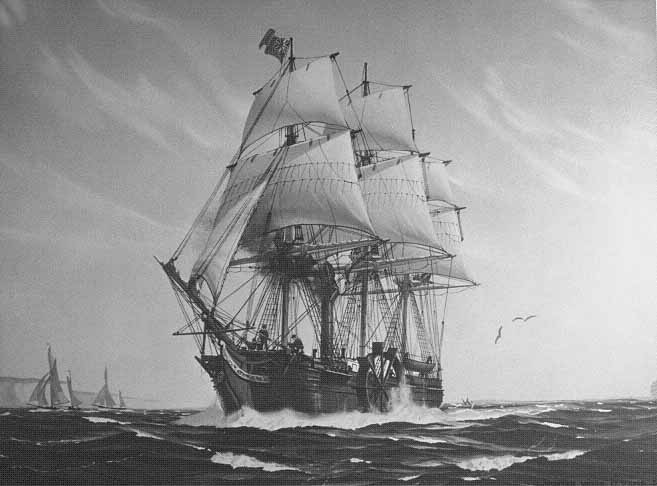
SS Savannah, the first steam-powered ship to cross the Atlantic Ocean—1819

The first sea-going steamboat was Richard Wright's first steamboat "Experiment", an ex-French lugger; she steamed from Leeds to Yarmouth, arriving Yarmouth 19 July 1813. "Tug", the first tugboat, was launched by the Woods Brothers, Port Glasgow, on 5 November 1817; in the summer of 1818 she was the first steamboat to travel round the North of Scotland to the East Coast.

By 1826, steamboats were employed on a large number of inland and coastal shipping lines in the United Kingdom. Some of the latter crossed the Irish Sea, others crossed the English Channel to Calais or Boulogne-sur-Mer, or crossed the North Sea to Rotterdam. At the time, the General Steam Navigation Company was one of the biggest companies that operated steamboats in short-sea shipping. The Talbot operated by GSNC on the London – Calais line had a tonnage of 156 and 60 hp.

Steamships required carrying fuel (coal) at the expense of the regular payload. For this reason for some time sailships remained more economically viable for long voyages. However, as the steam engine technology improved, more power could be generated by the same quantity of fuel and longer distances could be traveled. A steamship built in 1855 required about 40% of its available cargo space to store enough coal to cross the Atlantic, but by the 1860s, transatlantic steamship services became cost-effective and steamships began to dominate these routes. By the 1870s, particularly in conjunction with the opening of the Suez Canal in 1869, South Asia became economically accessible for steamships from Europe. By the 1890s, the steamship technology so improved that steamships became economically viable even on long-distance voyages such as linking Great Britain with its Pacific Asian colonies, such as Singapore and Hong Kong. This resulted in the downfall of sailing.

== Use by country ==
=== United States ===
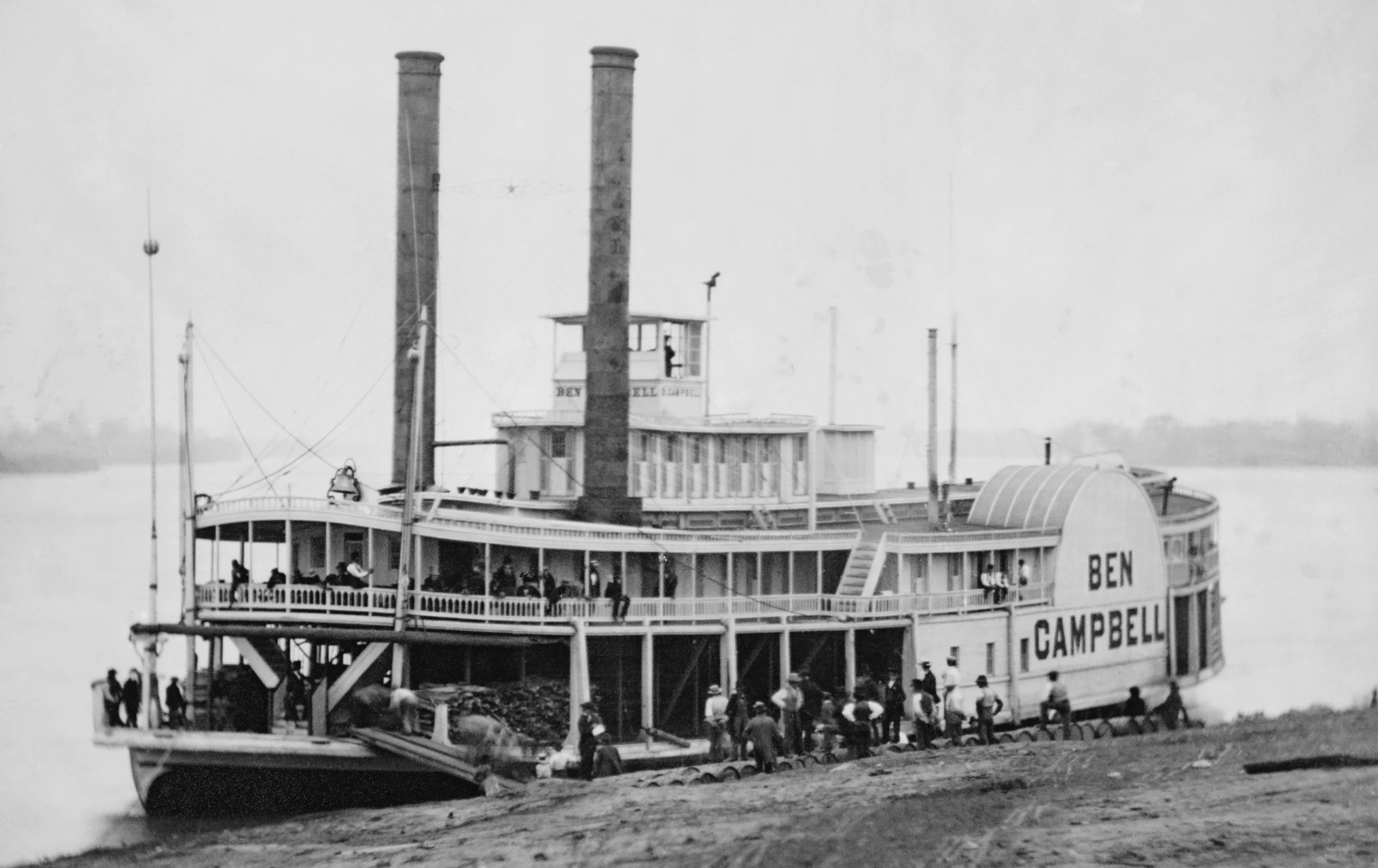
A typical river paddle steamer from the 1850s-the Ben Campbell

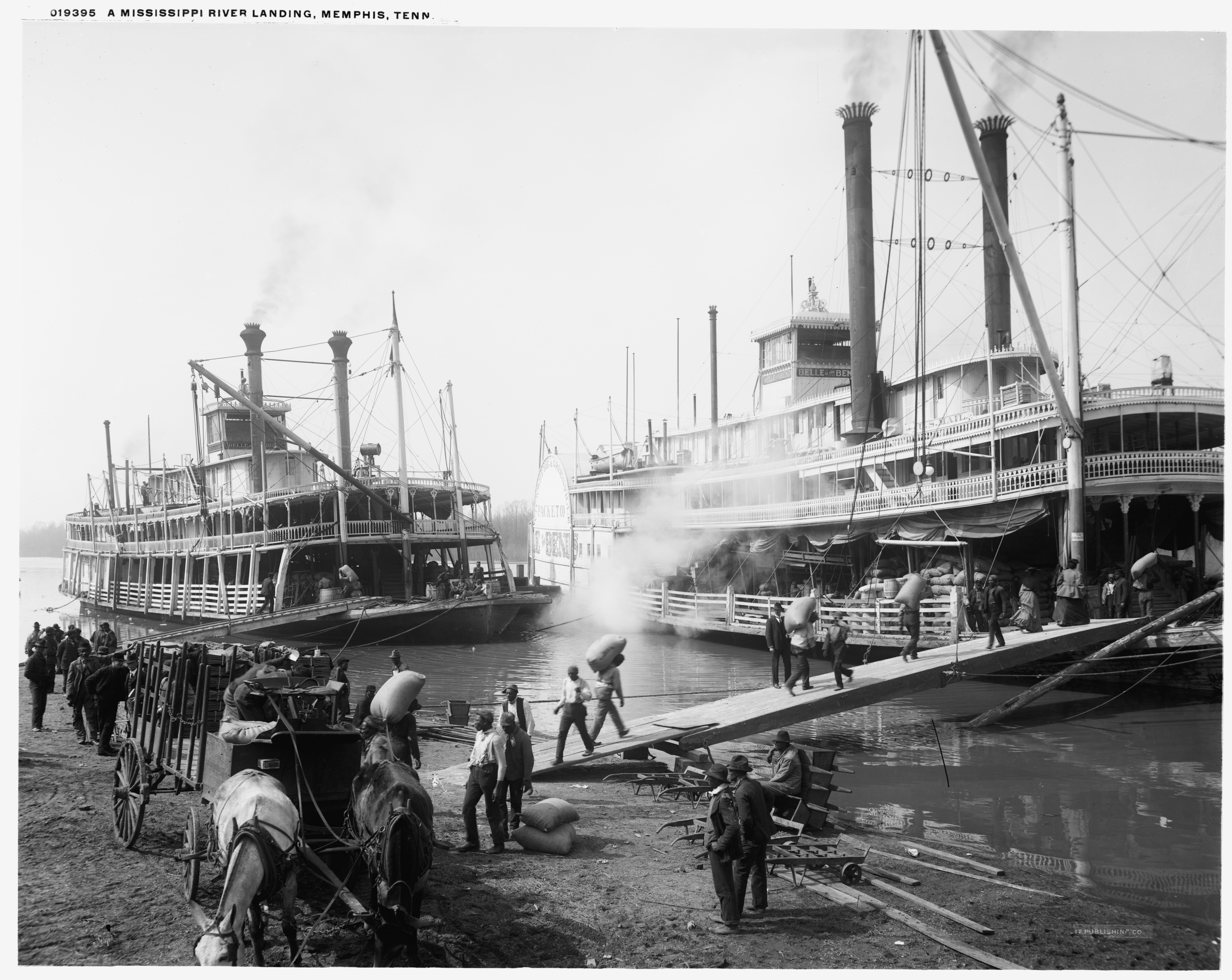
Mississippi Riverboats at Memphis, Tennessee (1906)

==== Origins ====
The era of the steamboat in the United States began in Philadelphia in 1787 when John Fitch (1743–1798) made the first successful trial of a 45-foot (14-meter) steamboat on the Delaware River on 22 August 1787, in the presence of members of the United States Constitutional Convention. Fitch later (1790) built a larger vessel that carried passengers and freight between Philadelphia and Burlington, New Jersey on the Delaware. His steamboat was not a financial success and was shut down after a few months service, however this marks the first use of marine steam propulsion in scheduled regular passenger transport service.

Oliver Evans (1755–1819) was a Philadelphian inventor born in Newport, Delaware, to a family of Welsh settlers. He designed an improved high-pressure steam engine in 1801 but did not build it (patented 1804). The Philadelphia Board of Health was concerned with the problem of dredging and cleaning the city's dockyards, and in 1805 Evans convinced them to contract with him for a steam-powered dredge, which he called the Oruktor Amphibolos. It was built but was only marginally successful. Evans's high-pressure steam engine had a much higher power-to-weight ratio, making it practical to apply it in locomotives and steamboats. Evans became so depressed with the poor protection that the US patent law gave inventors that he eventually took all his engineering drawings and invention ideas and destroyed them to prevent his children wasting their time in court fighting patent infringements.

Robert Fulton constructed a steamboat to ply a route between New York City and Albany, New York on the Hudson River. He successfully obtained a monopoly on Hudson River traffic after terminating a prior 1797 agreement with John Stevens, who owned extensive land on the Hudson River in New Jersey. The former agreement had partitioned northern Hudson River traffic to Livingston and southern to Stevens, agreeing to use ships designed by Stevens for both operations. With their new monopoly, Fulton and Livingston's boat, named the Clermont after Livingston's estate, could make a profit. The Clermont was nicknamed "Fulton's Folly" by doubters. On Monday, 17 August 1807, the memorable first voyage of the Clermont up the Hudson River was begun. She traveled the 150 miles (240 km) trip to Albany in a little over 32 hours and made the return trip in about eight hours.

The use of steamboats on major US rivers soon followed Fulton's 1807 success. In 1811, the first in a continuous (still in commercial passenger operation as of 2007) line of river steamboats left the dock at Pittsburgh to steam down the Ohio River to the Mississippi and on to New Orleans. In 1817 a consortium in Sackets Harbor, New York, funded the construction of the first US steamboat, Ontario, to run on Lake Ontario and the Great Lakes, beginning the growth of lake commercial and passenger traffic. In his book Life on the Mississippi, river pilot and author Mark Twain described much of the operation of such vessels.

==== Types of ships ====
By 1849 the shipping industry was in transition from sail-powered boats to steam-powered boats and from wood construction to an ever-increasing metal construction. There were basically three different types of ships being used: standard sailing ships of several different types, clippers, and paddle steamers with paddles mounted on the side or rear. River steamboats typically used rear-mounted paddles and had flat bottoms and shallow hulls designed to carry large loads on generally smooth and occasionally shallow rivers. Ocean-going paddle steamers typically used side-wheeled paddles and used narrower, deeper hulls designed to travel in the often stormy weather encountered at sea. The ship hull design was often based on the clipper ship design with extra bracing to support the loads and strains imposed by the paddle wheels when they encountered rough water.

The first paddle-steamer to make a long ocean voyage was the 320-ton 98-foot-long (30 m) SS Savannah, built in 1819 expressly for packet ship mail and passenger service to and from Liverpool, England. On 22 May 1819, the watch on the Savannah sighted Ireland after 23 days at sea. The Allaire Iron Works of New York supplied Savannah's's engine cylinder, while the rest of the engine components and running gear were manufactured by the Speedwell Ironworks of New Jersey. The 90-horsepower (67 kW) low-pressure engine was of the inclined direct-acting type, with a single 40-inch-diameter (100 cm) cylinder and a 5-foot (1.5 m) stroke. Savannah's engine and machinery were unusually large for their time. The ship's wrought-iron paddlewheels were 16 feet in diameter with eight buckets per wheel. For fuel, the vessel carried 75 short tons (68 t) of coal and 25 cords (91 m^{3}) of wood.

The SS Savannah was too small to carry much fuel, and the engine was intended only for use in calm weather and to get in and out of harbors. Under favorable winds the sails alone were able to provide a speed of at least four knots. The Savannah was judged not a commercial success, and its engine was removed and it was converted back to a regular sailing ship. By 1848 steamboats built by both United States and British shipbuilders were already in use for mail and passenger service across the Atlantic Ocean—a 3,000 miles (4,800 km) journey.

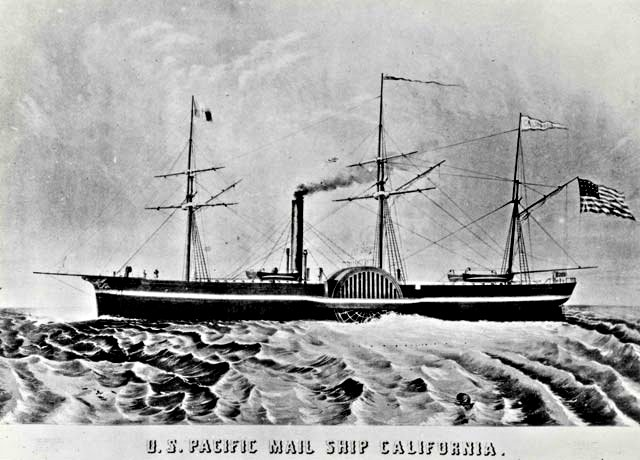
SS California (1848), the first paddle steamer to steam between Panama City and San Francisco—a Pacific Mail Steamship Company ship.

Since paddle steamers typically required from 5 to 16 short tons (4.5 to 14.5 t) of coal per day to keep their engines running, they were more expensive to run. Initially, nearly all seagoing steamboats were equipped with mast and sails to supplement the steam engine power and provide power for occasions when the steam engine needed repair or maintenance. These steamships typically concentrated on high value cargo, mail and passengers and only had moderate cargo capabilities because of their required loads of coal. The typical paddle wheel steamship was powered by a coal burning engine that required firemen to shovel the coal to the burners.

By 1849 the screw propeller had been invented and was slowly being introduced as iron increasingly was used in ship construction and the stress introduced by propellers could be compensated for. As the 1800s progressed the timber and lumber needed to make wooden ships got ever more expensive, and the iron plate needed for iron ship construction got much cheaper as the massive iron works at Merthyr Tydfil, Wales, for example, got ever more efficient. The propeller put a lot of stress on the rear of the ships and would not see widespread use till the conversion from wood boats to iron boats was complete—well underway by 1860. By the 1840s the ocean-going steam ship industry was well established as the Cunard Line and others demonstrated.

The last sailing frigate of the US Navy, Santee, had been launched in 1855.

==== West Coast ====
In the mid-1840s the acquisition of Oregon and California opened up the West Coast to American steamboat traffic. Starting in 1848 Congress subsidized the Pacific Mail Steamship Company with $199,999 to set up regular packet ship, mail, passenger, and cargo routes in the Pacific Ocean. This regular scheduled route went from Panama City, Nicaragua and Mexico to and from San Francisco and Oregon. Panama City was the Pacific terminus of the Isthmus of Panama trail across Panama. The Atlantic Ocean mail contract from East Coast cities and New Orleans to and from the Chagres River in Panama was won by the United States Mail Steamship Company whose first paddle wheel steamship, the SS Falcon (1848) was dispatched on 1 December 1848 to the Caribbean (Atlantic) terminus of the Isthmus of Panama trail—the Chagres River.

The SS California (1848), the first Pacific Mail Steamship Company paddle wheel steamship, left New York City on 6 October 1848 with only a partial load of her about 60 saloon (about $300 fare) and 150 steerage (about $150 fare) passenger capacity. Only a few were going all the way to California. Her crew numbered about 36 men. She left New York well before confirmed word of the California Gold Rush had reached the East Coast. Once the California Gold Rush was confirmed by President James Polk in his State of the Union address on 5 December 1848 people started rushing to Panama City to catch the SS California. The SS California picked up more passengers in Valparaíso, Chile and Panama City, Panama and showed up in San Francisco, loaded with about 400 passengers—twice the passengers it had been designed for—on 28 February 1849. She had left behind about another 400–600 potential passengers still looking for passage from Panama City. The SS California had made the trip from Panama and Mexico after steaming around Cape Horn from New York—see SS California (1848).

The trips by paddle wheel steamship to Panama and Nicaragua from New York, Philadelphia, Boston, via New Orleans and Havana were about 2,600 miles (4,200 km) long and took about two weeks. Trips across the Isthmus of Panama or Nicaragua typically took about one week by native canoe and mule back. The 4,000 miles (6,400 km) trip to or from San Francisco to Panama City could be done by paddle wheel steamer in about three weeks. In addition to this, travel time via the Panama route typically had a two- to four-week waiting period to find a ship going from Panama City, Panama to San Francisco before 1850. It was not before 1850 that enough paddle wheel steamers were available in the Atlantic and Pacific routes to establish regularly scheduled journeys.

Other steamships soon followed, and by late 1849, paddle wheel steamships like the SS McKim (1848) were carrying miners and their supplies the 125 miles (201 km) trip from San Francisco up the extensive Sacramento–San Joaquin River Delta to Stockton, California, Marysville, California, Sacramento, etc. to get about 125 miles (201 km) closer to the gold fields. Steam-powered tugboats and towboats started working in the San Francisco Bay soon after this to expedite shipping in and out of the bay.

As the passenger, mail and high value freight business to and from California boomed more and more paddle steamers were brought into service—eleven by the Pacific Mail Steamship Company alone. The trip to and from California via Panama and paddle wheeled steamers could be done, if there were no waits for shipping, in about 40 days—over 100 days less than by wagon or 160 days less than a trip around Cape Horn. About 20–30% of the California Argonauts are thought to have returned to their homes, mostly on the East Coast of the United States via Panama—the fastest way home. Many returned to California after settling their business in the East with their wives, family and/or sweethearts. Most used the Panama or Nicaragua route till 1855 when the completion of the Panama Railroad made the Panama Route much easier, faster and more reliable. Between 1849 and 1869 when the first transcontinental railroad was completed across the United States about 800,000 travelers had used the Panama route. Most of the roughly $50,000,000 of gold found each year in California were shipped East via the Panama route on paddle steamers, mule trains and canoes and later the Panama Railroad across Panama. After 1855 when the Panama Railroad was completed the Panama Route was by far the quickest and easiest way to get to or from California from the East Coast of the U.S. or Europe. Most California bound merchandise still used the slower but cheaper Cape Horn sailing ship route. The sinking of the paddle steamer SS Central America (the Ship of Gold) in a hurricane on 12 September 1857 and the loss of about $2 million in California gold indirectly led to the Panic of 1857.

Steamboat traffic including passenger and freight business grew exponentially in the decades before the Civil War. So too did the economic and human losses inflicted by snags, shoals, boiler explosions, and human error.

==== Civil War ====
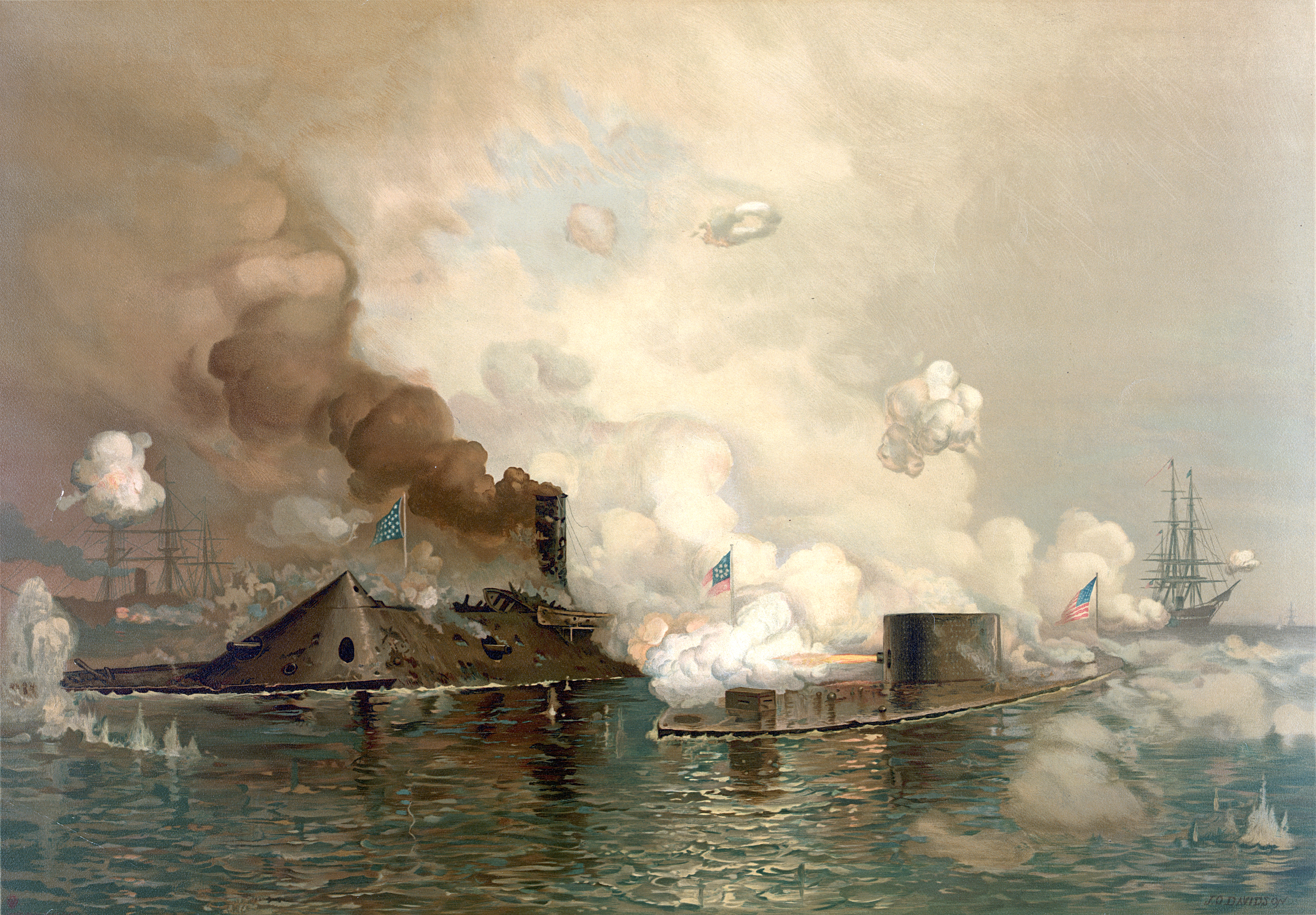
Chromolithograph depicting the Monitor and the Merrimack

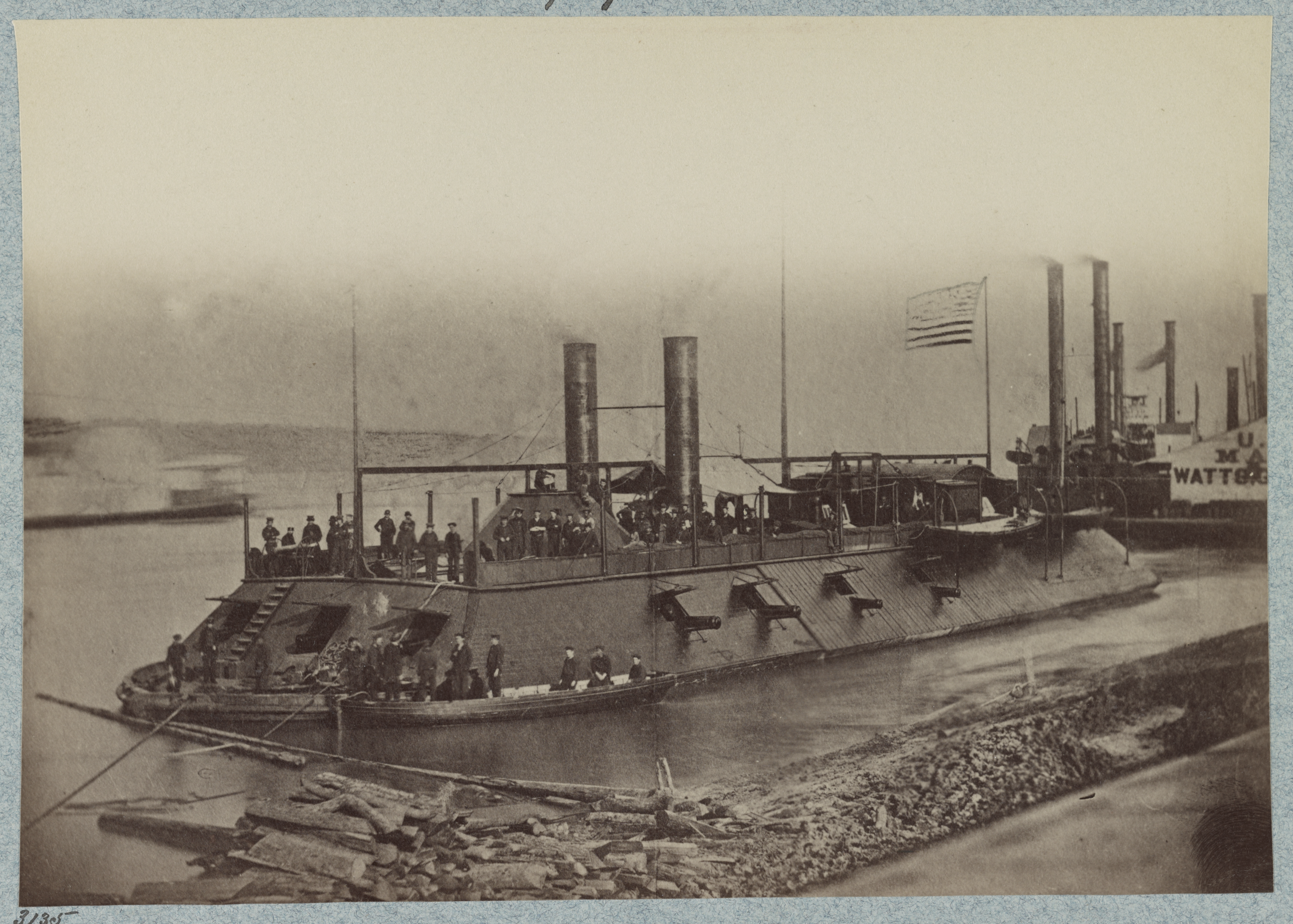
USS Cairo

During the US Civil War the Battle of Hampton Roads, often referred to as either the Battle of the Monitor and Merrimack or the Battle of Ironclads, was fought over two days with steam-powered ironclad warships, 8–9 March 1862. The battle occurred in Hampton Roads, a roadstead in Virginia where the Elizabeth and Nansemond Rivers meet the James River just before it enters Chesapeake Bay adjacent to the city of Norfolk. The battle was a part of the effort of the Confederate States of America to break the Union Naval blockade, which had cut off Virginia from all international trade.

The Civil War in the West was fought to control major rivers, especially the Mississippi and Tennessee Rivers using paddlewheelers. Only the Union had them (the Confederacy captured a few, but were unable to use them.) The Battle of Vicksburg involved monitors and ironclad riverboats. The USS Cairo is a survivor of the Vicksburg battle. Trade on the river was suspended for two years because of a Confederate's Mississippi blockade before the union victory at Vicksburg reopened the river on 4 July 1863. The triumph of Eads ironclads, and Farragut's seizure of New Orleans, secured the river for the Union North.

Although Union forces gained control of Mississippi River tributaries, travel there was still subject to interdiction by the Confederates. The Ambush of the steamboat J. R. Williams, which was carrying supplies from Fort Smith to Fort Gibson along the Arkansas River on 16 July 1863 demonstrated this. The steamboat was destroyed, the cargo was lost, and the tiny Union escort was run off. The loss did not affect the Union war effort, however.

==== Explosions and fires ====
Steamboat travel became a preferred method of travel in the early 1800s before the widescale development of railroads, because of its speed and comfort compared to overland travel by horse, wagon, or foot. Hundreds of steamboats traversed American rivers, but until technology and safety standards evolved, their use outstripped their safety. In addition to river hazards such as submerged trees and collisions with other boats in the dark, the primary danger was of boilers exploding and causing fires. One accounting lists more than 1,000 major steamboat accidents on the Mississippi River and its tributaries between 1811 and 1851. "Western steamboats usually blow up one or two a week in the season," wrote the English author Charles Dickens after an 1842 tour. Just between St. Louis and the Ohio River, 411 steamboats were damaged by fire, explosions or ice between 1811 and 1899. Between 1816 and 1853, an estimated 7,000 people died in steamboat explosions.

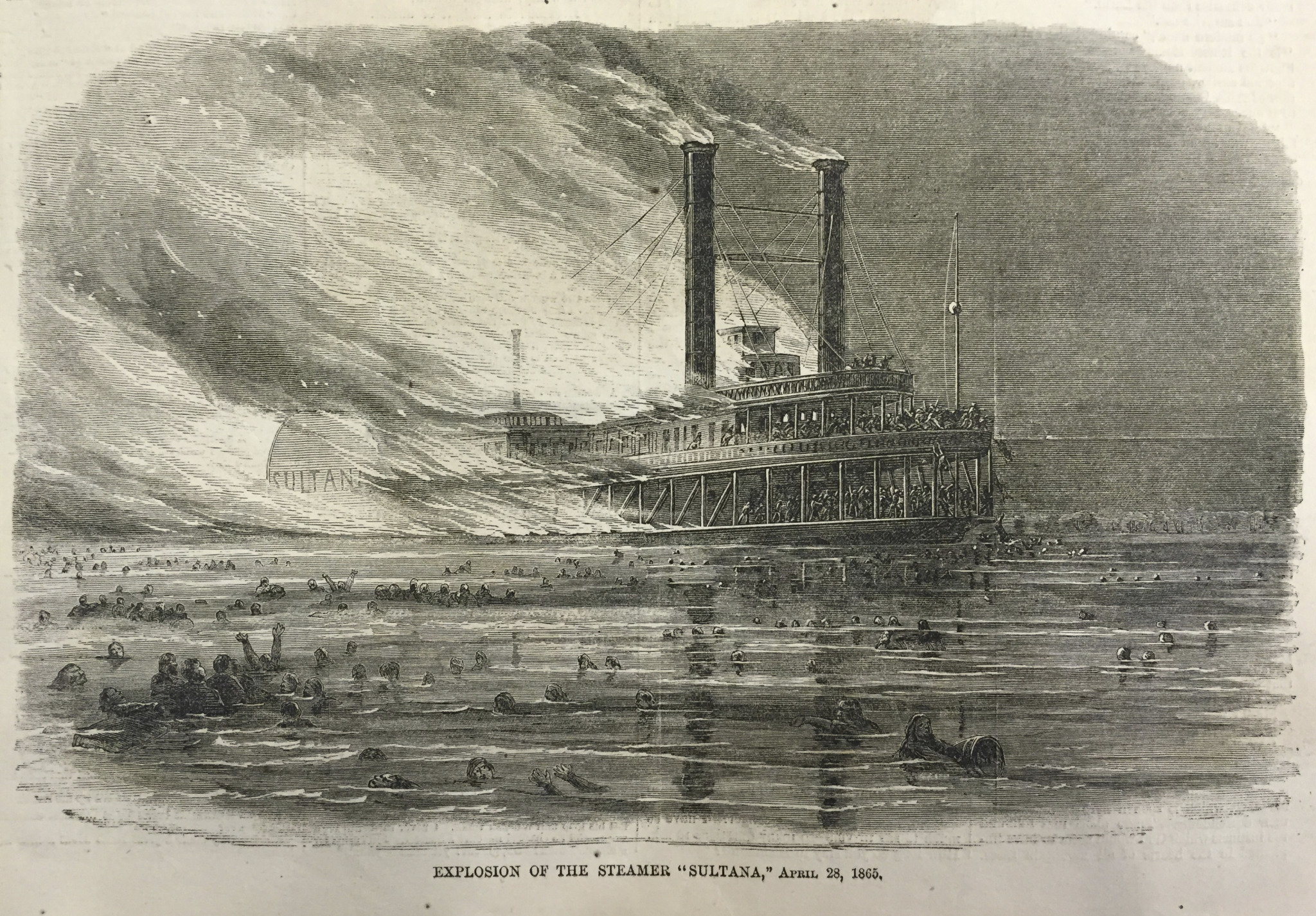
The Sultana on fire, from Harpers Weekly

The first boiler explosion to incur fatalities occurred in 1816 when 13 died on board the steamboat Washington at Marietta, Ohio. In a particularly deadly incident in 1838, all four boilers aboard the Moselle exploded simultaneously off the coast of Cincinnati, leaving at least 120 dead. Accidents increased after steamboats began racing each other, in what became a nationwide phenomenon. Steamboat captains competed with each other and huge sums were gambled on the races. Boiler explosions and fires were even more likely to occur during races, as crews ignored safety precautions to pour on extra speed. The worst of all steamboat accidents occurred at the end of the Civil War on April 27, 1865, when the steamboat Sultana, carrying an over-capacity load of returning Union soldiers recently freed from a Confederate prison camp, blew up, causing at least 1,100 deaths and perhaps as many as 1,700., which would have been more deaths than occurred on the Titanic. The incident was largely forgotten because it occurred shortly after the surrender of Robert E. Lee on April 9, ending the Civil War, and the assassination of Abraham Lincoln, a few days after that, combined with the public's general callousness to news stories of fatalities, after four years of wars.

In 1852, the Steamboat Act was passed by the Federal government, which imposed stricter inspection and safety requirements.

==== Mississippi and Missouri river traffic ====
For most of the 19th century and part of the early 20th century, trade on the Mississippi River was dominated by paddle-wheel steamboats. Their use generated rapid development of economies of port cities; the exploitation of agricultural and commodity products, which could be more easily transported to markets; and prosperity along the major rivers. Their success led to penetration deep into the continent, where Anson Northup in 1859 became the first steamer to cross the Canada–US border on the Red River. They would also be involved in major political events, as when Louis Riel seized International at Fort Garry, or Gabriel Dumont was engaged by Northcote at Batoche. Steamboats were held in such high esteem that they could become state symbols; the Steamboat Iowa (1838) is incorporated in the Seal of Iowa because it represented speed, power, and progress.

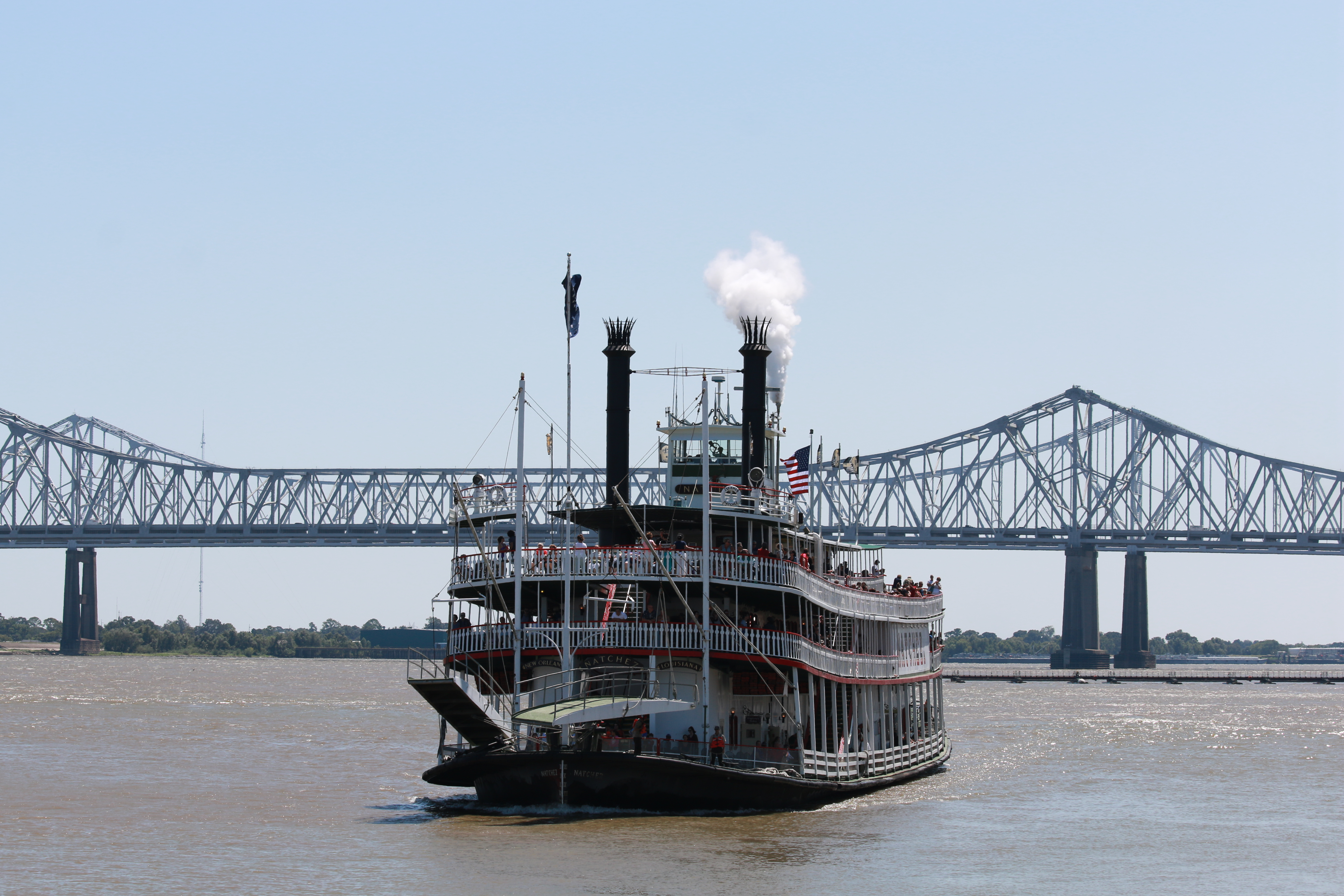
The Natchez operates out of New Orleans. There are other paddlewheelers on the Mississippi, but the Natchez and the American Queen are the only two that are propelled by steam.

At the same time, the expanding steamboat traffic had severe adverse environmental effects, in the Middle Mississippi Valley especially, between St. Louis and the river's confluence with the Ohio. The steamboats consumed much wood for fuel, and the river floodplain and banks became deforested. This led to instability in the banks, addition of silt to the water, making the river both shallower and hence wider and causing unpredictable, lateral movement of the river channel across the wide, ten-mile floodplain, endangering navigation. Boats designated as snagpullers to keep the channels free had crews that sometimes cut remaining large trees 100–200 feet (30–61 m) or more back from the banks, exacerbating the problems. In the 19th century, the flooding of the Mississippi became a more severe problem than when the floodplain was filled with trees and brush.

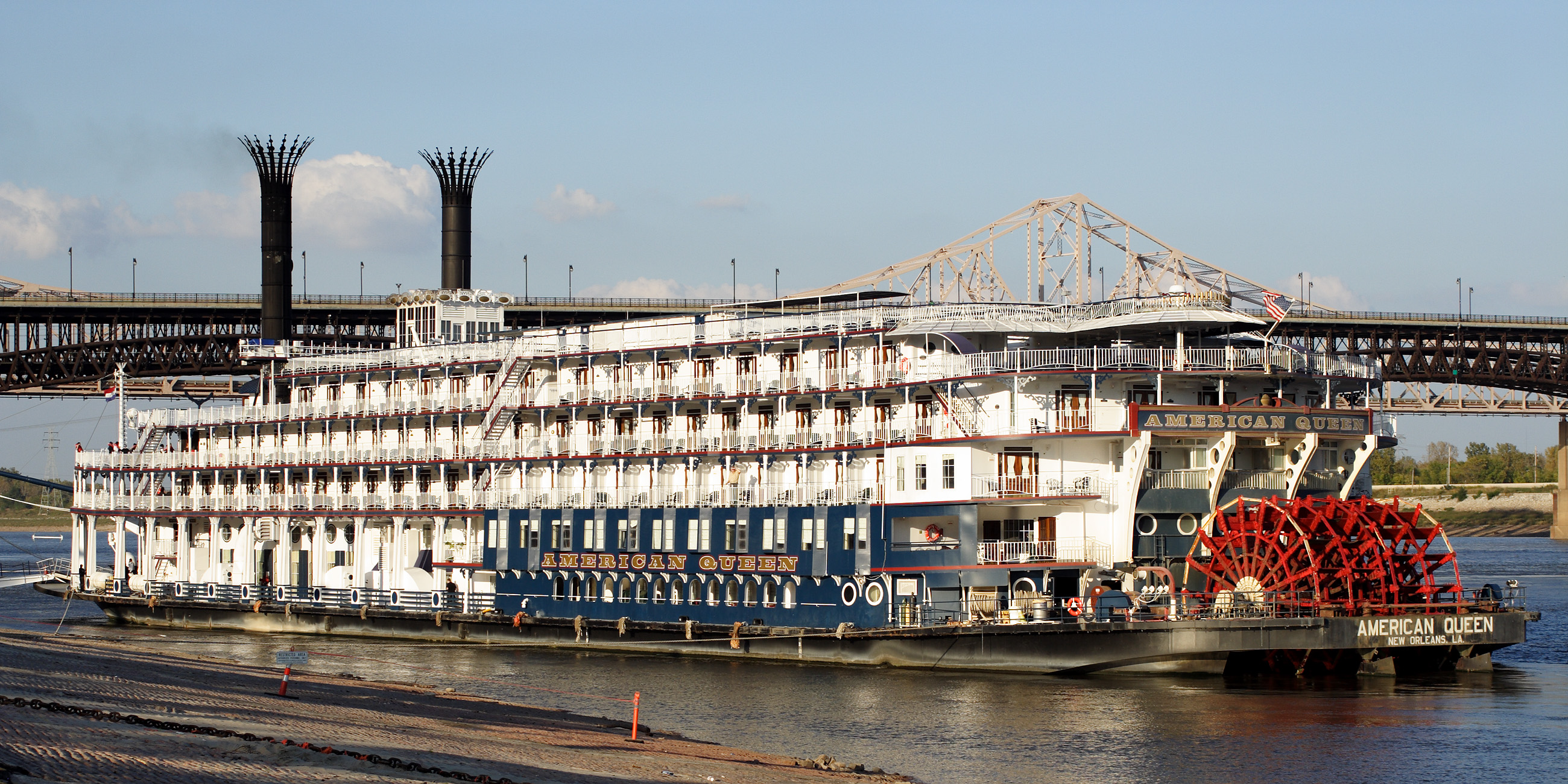
The American Queen, the world's largest operating river steamboat

From 1844 through 1857, luxurious palace steamers carried passengers and cargo around the North American Great Lakes. Great Lakes passenger steamers reached their zenith during the century from 1850 to 1950. The SS Badger is the last of the once-numerous passenger-carrying steam-powered car ferries operating on the Great Lakes. A unique style of bulk carrier known as the lake freighter was developed on the Great Lakes. The St. Marys Challenger, launched in 1906, is the oldest operating steamship in the United States. She runs a Skinner Marine Unaflow 4-cylinder reciprocating steam engine as her power plant.

Women started to become steamboat captains in the late 19th century. The first woman to earn her steamboat master's license was Mary Millicent Miller, in 1884. In 1888, Callie Leach French earned her first class license. In 1892, she earned a master's license, becoming the only woman to hold both and operating on the Mississippi River. French towed a showboat up and down the rivers until 1907 and boasted that she'd never had an accident or lost a boat. Another early steamboat captain was Blanche Douglass Leathers, who earned her license in 1894. Mary Becker Greene earned her license in 1897 and along with her husband started the Greene Line.

One of the few surviving Mississippi sternwheelers from this period, the, James R. Pearson, built in 1898, was refurbished and renamed the Julius C. Wilkie in 1959, and operated as a museum ship at Winona, Minnesota. It was destroyed in a fire in 1981. The replacement, built in situ, was not a steamboat and eventually scrapped in 2008.

===== Steamboats in rivers on the west side of the Mississippi River =====
Steamboats also operated on the Red River to Shreveport, Louisiana.

In April 1815, Captain Henry Miller Shreve was the first person to bring a steamboat, the Enterprise, up the Red River.

By 1839 after Captain Henry Miller Shreve broke the Great Raft log jam had been 160 miles long on the river.

In the late 1830s, the steamboats in rivers on the west side of the Mississippi River were a long, wide, shallow draft vessel, lightly built with an engine on the deck. These newer steamboats could sail in just 20 inches of water. Contemporaries claimed that they could "run with a lot of heavy dew".

==== Walking the steamboat over sandbars or away from reefs ====
Walking the boat was a way of lifting the bow of a steamboat like on crutches, getting up and down a sandbank with poles, blocks, and strong rigging, and using paddlewheels to lift and move the ship through successive steps, on the helm. Moving of a boat from a sandbar by its own action was known as "walking the boat" and "grass-hoppering". Two long, strong poles were pushed forward from the bow on either side of the boat into the sandbar at a high degree of angle. Near the end of each pole, a block was secured with a strong rope or clamp that passed through pulleys that lowered through a pair of similar blocks attached to the deck near the bow. The end of each line went to a winch which, when turned, was taut and, with its weight on the stringers, slightly raised the bow of the boat. Activation of the forward paddlewheels and placement of the poles caused the bow of the boat to raise and move the boat forward perhaps a few feet. It was laborious and dangerous work for the crew, even with a Steam donkey driven capstan winch.

==== Double-tripping ====
Double-tripping means making two voyages by leaving a cargo of a steamboat ashore to lighten boats load during times of extremely low water or when ice impedes progress. The boat had to return (and therefore make a second trip) to retrieve the cargo.

==== Piston Rings, Steel replaced cotton seals, 1854 ====
1854: John Ramsbottom publishes a report on his use of oversized split steel piston rings which maintain a seal by outward spring tension on the cylinder wall. This improved efficiency by allowing much better sealing (compared to earlier cotton seals) which allowed significantly higher system pressures before "blow-by" is experienced.

==== Allen Steam Engine at 3 to 5 times higher speeds, 1862 ====
1862: The Allen steam engine (later called Porter-Allen) is exhibited at the London Exhibition. It is precision engineered and balanced allowing it to operate at from three to five times the speed of other stationary engines. The short stroke and high speed minimize condensation in the cylinder, significantly improving efficiency. The high speed allows direct coupling or the use of reduced sized pulleys and belting.

==== Boilers, Water Tubes, Not Explosive, 1867 ====
1867: Stephen Wilcox and his partner George Herman Babcock patent the "Babcock & Wilcox Non-Explosive Boiler", which uses water inside clusters of tubing to generate steam, typically with higher pressures and more efficiently than the typical "firetube" boilers of that time. Babcock & Wilcox-type boiler designs become popular in new installations.

==== Triple Expansion Steam Engine, 1881 ====
1881: Alexander C. Kirk designs the first practical triple expansion engine which was installed in SS Aberdeen.

==== Steam Turbine, 1884 ====
1884: Charles Algernon Parsons developed the steam turbine, used in early electrical generation and to power ships. The efficiency of large steam turbines is considerably better than the best compound piston engines, and they are much simpler, more reliable, smaller and lighter. Steam turbines eventually replaced piston engines for most power generation.

==== 20th century ====
The Belle of Louisville is the oldest operating steamboat in the United States, and the oldest operating Mississippi River-style steamboat in the world. She was laid down as Idlewild in 1914, and is currently located in Louisville, Kentucky.

Five major commercial steamboats currently operate on the inland waterways of the United States. The only remaining overnight cruising steamboat is the 432-passenger American Queen, which operates week-long cruises on the Mississippi, Ohio, Cumberland and Tennessee Rivers 11 months out of the year. The others are day boats: they are the steamers Chautauqua Belle at Chautauqua Lake, New York, Minne Ha-Ha at Lake George, New York, operating on Lake George; the Belle of Louisville in Louisville, Kentucky, operating on the Ohio River; and the Natchez in New Orleans, Louisiana, operating on the Mississippi River. For modern craft operated on rivers, see the Riverboat article.

=== Canada ===
In Canada, the city of Terrace, British Columbia, celebrates "Riverboat Days" each summer. Built on the banks of the Skeena River, the city depended on the steamboat for transportation and trade into the 20th century. The first steamer to enter the Skeena was Union in 1864. In 1866 Mumford attempted to ascend the river, but it was only able to reach the Kitsumkalum River. It was not until 1891 Hudson's Bay Company sternwheeler Caledonia successfully negotiated Kitselas Canyon and reached Hazelton. A number of other steamers were built around the turn of the 20th century, in part due to the growing fish industry and the gold rush. For more information, see Steamboats of the Skeena River.

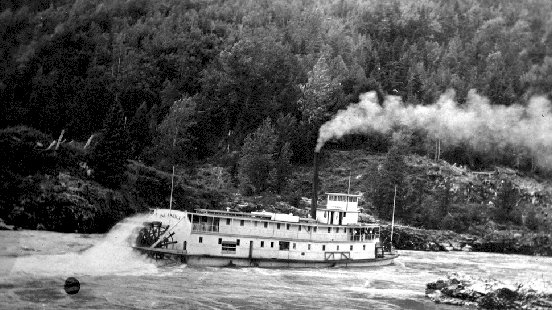
S.S. Inlander on the Skeena River at Kitselas Canyon, 1911

Sternwheelers were an instrumental transportation technology in the development of Western Canada. They were used on most of the navigable waterways of Manitoba, Saskatchewan, Alberta, BC (British Columbia) and the Yukon at one time or another, generally being supplanted by the expansion of railroads and roads. In the more mountainous and remote areas of the Yukon and BC, working sternwheelers lived on well into the 20th century.

The simplicity of these vessels and their shallow draft made them indispensable to pioneer communities that were otherwise virtually cut off from the outside world. Because of their shallow, flat-bottomed construction (the Canadian examples of the western river sternwheeler generally needed less than three feet of water to float in), they could nose up almost anywhere along a riverbank to pick up or drop off passengers and freight. Sternwheelers would also prove vital to the construction of the railroads that eventually replaced them. They were used to haul supplies, track and other materials to construction camps.

The simple, versatile, locomotive-style boilers fitted to most sternwheelers after about the 1860s could burn coal, when available in more populated areas like the lakes of the Kootenays and the Okanagan region in southern BC, or wood in the more remote areas, such as the Steamboats of the Yukon River or northern BC.

The hulls were generally wooden, although iron, steel and composite hulls gradually overtook them. They were braced internally with a series of built-up longitudinal timbers called "keelsons". Further resilience was given to the hulls by a system of "hog rods" or "hog chains" that were fastened into the keelsons and led up and over vertical masts called "hog-posts", and back down again.

Like their counterparts on the Mississippi and its tributaries, and the vessels on the rivers of California, Idaho, Oregon, Washington and Alaska, the Canadian sternwheelers tended to have fairly short life-spans. The hard usage they were subjected to and inherent flexibility of their shallow wooden hulls meant that relatively few of them had careers longer than a decade.

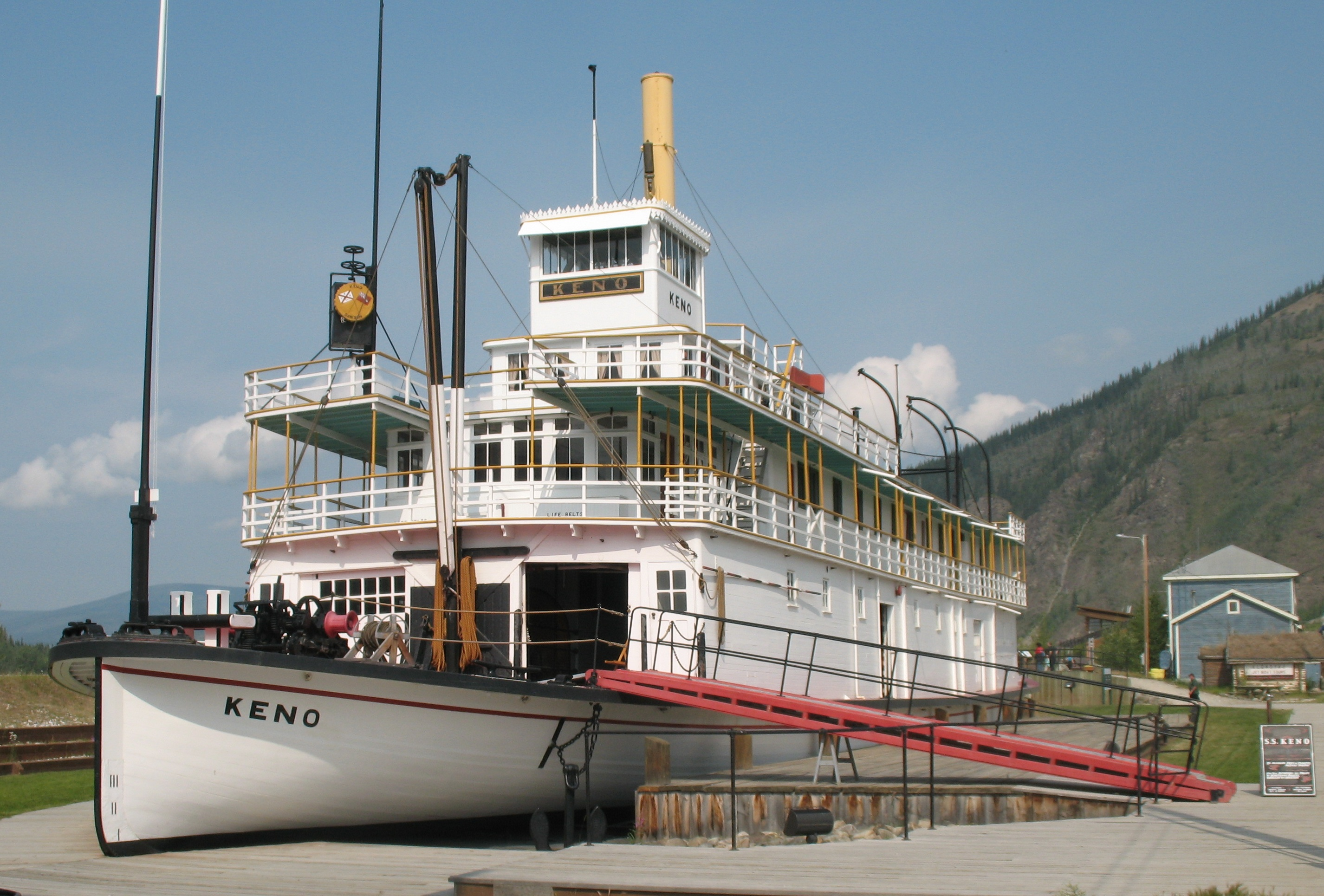
The SS Keno in Dawson City

In the Yukon, two vessels are preserved: the SS Klondike in Whitehorse and the SS Keno in Dawson City. Many derelict hulks can still be found along the Yukon River.

In British Columbia, the Moyie, built by the Canadian Pacific Railway (CPR) in 1898, was operated on Kootenay Lake in south-eastern BC until 1957. It has been carefully restored and is on display in the village of Kaslo, where it acts as a tourist attraction right next to information centre in downtown Kaslo. The Moyie is the world's oldest intact stern wheeler. While the SS Sicamous and SS Naramata (steam tug & icebreaker) built by the CPR at Okanagan Landing on Okanagan Lake in 1914 have been preserved in Penticton at the south end of Okanagan Lake.

The SS Samson V is the only Canadian steam-powered sternwheeler that has been preserved afloat. It was built in 1937 by the Canadian federal Department of Public Works as a snagboat for clearing logs and debris out of the lower reaches of the Fraser River and for maintaining docks and aids to navigation. The fifth in a line of Fraser River snagpullers, the Samson V has engines, paddlewheel and other components that were passed down from the Samson II of 1914. It is now moored on the Fraser River as a floating museum in its home port of New Westminster, near Vancouver, BC.

The oldest operating steam driven vessel in North America is the RMS Segwun. It was built in Scotland in 1887 to cruise the Muskoka Lakes, District of Muskoka, Ontario, Canada. Originally named the S.S. Nipissing, it was converted from a side-paddle-wheel steamer with a walking-beam engine into a two-counter-rotating-propeller steamer.

The first woman steamboat captain on the Columbia River was Minnie Mossman Hill, who earned her master's and pilot's license in 1887.

=== Great Britain ===
Engineer Robert Fourness and his cousin, physician James Ashworth are said to have had a steamboat running between Hull and Beverley, after having been granted British Patent No. 1640 of March 1788 for a "new invented machine for working, towing, expediting and facilitating the voyage of ships, sloops and barges and other vessels upon the water". James Oldham, MICE, described how well he knew those who had built the F&A steamboat in a lecture entitled "On the rise, progress and present position of steam navigation in Hull" that he gave at the 23rd Meeting of the British Association for the Advancement for Science in Hull, England on 7 September 1853. The first commercially successful steamboat in Europe, Henry Bell's Comet of 1812, started a rapid expansion of steam services on the Firth of Clyde, and within four years a steamer service was in operation on the inland Loch Lomond, a forerunner of the lake steamers still gracing Swiss lakes.

On the Clyde itself, within ten years of Comet's start in 1812 there were nearly fifty steamers, and services had started across the Irish Sea to Belfast and on many British estuaries. By 1900 there were over 300 Clyde steamers.

People have had a particular affection for the Clyde puffers, small steam freighters of traditional design developed to use the Scottish canals and to serve the Highlands and Islands. They were immortalised by the tales of Para Handy's boat Vital Spark by Neil Munro and by the film The Maggie, and a small number are being conserved to continue in steam around the west highland sea lochs.

From 1850 to the early decades of the 20th century Windermere, in the English Lake District, was home to many elegant steam launches. They were used for private parties, watching the yacht races or, in one instance, commuting to work, via the rail connection to Barrow in Furness. Many of these fine craft were saved from destruction when steam went out of fashion and are now part of the collection at Windermere Steamboat Museum. The collection includes SL Dolly, 1850, thought to be the world's oldest mechanically powered boat, and several of the classic Windermere launches.

Today the 1900 steamer SS Sir Walter Scott still sails on Loch Katrine, while on Loch Lomond PS Maid of the Loch is being restored, and in the English Lakes the oldest operating passenger yacht, SY Gondola (built 1859, rebuilt 1979), sails daily during the summer season on Coniston Water.

The paddle steamer Waverley, built in 1947, is the last survivor of these fleets, and the last seagoing paddle steamer in the world. This ship sails a full season of cruises every year from places around Britain, and has sailed across the English Channel for a visit to commemorate the sinking of her predecessor, built in 1899, at the Battle of Dunkirk in 1940.

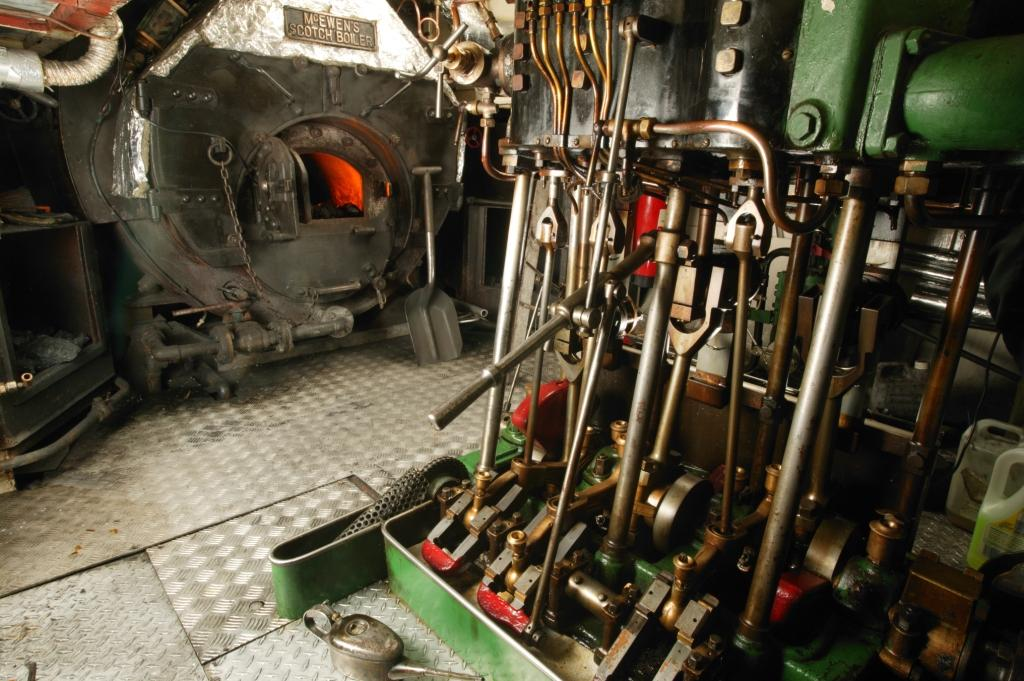
Sissons triple-expansion steam engine and coal-fired Scotch boiler, as installed in SL Nuneham

After the Clyde, the Thames estuary was the main growth area for steamboats, starting with the Margery and the Thames in 1815, which were both brought down from the Clyde. Until the arrival of railways from 1838 onwards, steamers steadily took over the role of the many sail and rowed ferries, with at least 80 ferries by 1830 with routes from London to Gravesend and Margate, and upstream to Richmond. By 1835, the Diamond Steam Packet Company, one of several popular companies, reported that it had carried over 250,000 passengers in the year.

The first steamboat constructed of iron, the Aaron Manby was laid down in the Horseley Ironworks in Staffordshire in 1821 and launched at the Surrey Docks in Rotherhithe. After testing in the Thames, the boat steamed to Paris where she was used on the River Seine. Three similar iron steamers followed within a few years.

Bellis steam launch engine
A Bellis steam launch engine, made in Birmingham, and now in Thinktank museum there

There are few genuine steamboats left on the River Thames; however, a handful remain.

The SL (steam launch) Nuneham is a genuine Victorian steamer built in 1898, and operated on the non-tidal upper Thames by the Thames Steam Packet Boat Company. It is berthed at Runnymede.

SL Nuneham was built at Port Brimscombe on the Thames and Severn Canal by Edwin Clarke. She was built for Salter Bros at Oxford for the regular passenger service between Oxford and Kingston. The original Sissons triple-expansion steam engine was removed in the 1960s and replaced with a diesel engine. In 1972, the SL Nuneham was sold to a London boat operator and entered service on the Westminster Pier to Hampton Court service. In 1984 the boat was sold again – now practically derelict – to French Brothers Ltd at Runnymede as a restoration project.

Over a number of years French Brothers carefully restored the launch to its former specification. A similar Sissons triple-expansion engine was found in a museum in America, shipped back to the UK and installed, along with a new coal-fired Scotch boiler, designed and built by Alan McEwen of Keighley, Yorkshire. The superstructure was reconstructed to the original design and elegance, including the raised roof, wood paneled saloon and open top deck. The restoration was completed in 1997 and the launch was granted an MCA passenger certificate for 106 passengers. SL Nuneham was entered back into service by French Brothers Ltd, but trading as the Thames Steam Packet Boat Company.

The Thames Steam Packet Boat Company also operate SL Streatley. Streatley is an Edwardian steamer, also built by Salter Bros in 1915. Streatley and Nuneham can often be seen together cruising the upper reaches of the River Thames.

=== Europe ===
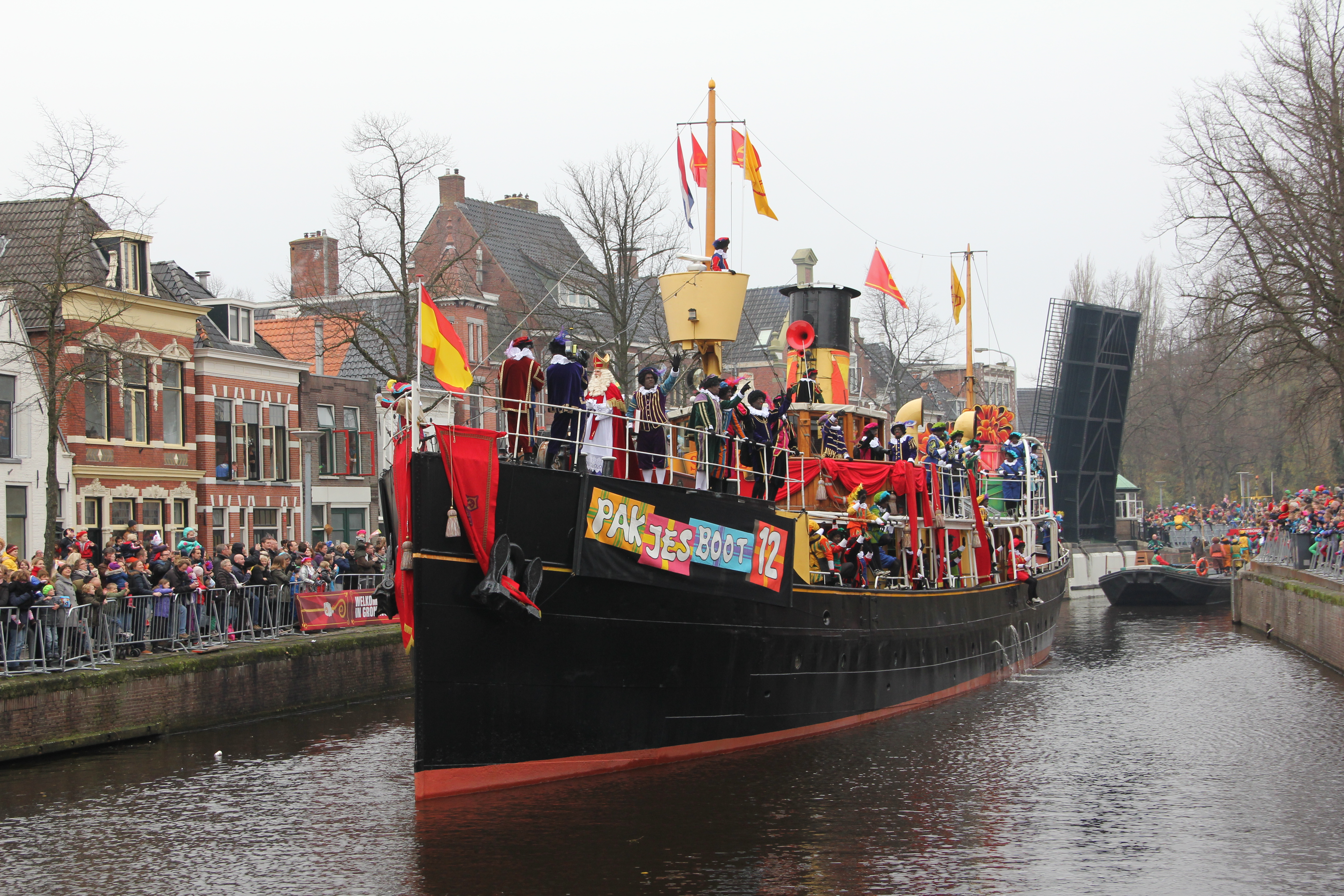
Pakjesboot 12 arrives in The Netherlands.

Built in 1856, PS Skibladner is the oldest steamship still in operation, serving towns along lake Mjøsa in Norway.

In Denmark, steamboats were a popular means of transportation in earlier times, mostly for recreational purposes. They were deployed to carry passengers for short distances along the coastline or across larger lakes. Falling out of favour later on, some of the original boats are still in operation in a few places, such as Hjejlen. Built in 1861, this steamboat is running second to the Norwegian Skibladner as the oldest steamship in operation and sails the lake of Julsø near Silkeborg.

Swiss lakes are home of a number of large steamships. On Lake Lucerne, five paddle steamers are still in service: Uri (1901) (built in 1901, 800 passengers), Unterwalden (1902) (1902, 800 passengers), Schiller (1906) (1906, 900 passengers), Gallia (Schiff, 1913) (1913, 900 passengers, fastest paddle-wheeler on European lakes) and Stadt Luzern (Schiff, 1928) (1928, 1200 passengers, last steamship built for a Swiss lake). There are also five steamers as well as some old steamships converted to diesel-powered paddlewheelers on Lake Geneva, two steamers on Lake Zurich and single ones on other lakes.

In Austria the paddle-wheeler Gisela (1871) (250 passengers) of 1871 vintage continues in service on Traunsee. The paddle-wheeler Hohentwiel of 1913 is the oldest running passenger ship on the Lake of Constance. In The Netherlands, a steamboat is used for the annual Sinterklaas celebration. According to tradition, Sinterklaas always arrives in the Netherlands by steamboat. The steamer in The Netherlands is called Pakjesboot 12.

=== New Zealand ===
The New Zealand-built 1912 steamer TSS Earnslaw still makes regular sight-seeing trips across Lake Wakatipu, an alpine lake near Queenstown.

=== Vietnam ===
Seeing the great potential of the steam-powered vessels, Vietnamese Emperor Minh Mạng attempted to reproduce a French-made steamboat. The first test in 1838 was a failure as the boiler was broken. The task supervisor was chained and two officials Nguyễn Trung Mậu, Ngô Kim Lân from the Ministry of Construction were jailed for false report. The project was assigned again to Hoàng Văn Lịch and Võ Huy Trinh. In the second test two months later, the engine performed greatly. The Emperor rewarded the two handsomely. He commented that although this machine could be purchased from the Westerner, it is important that his engineers and mechanics could acquaint themselves with modern machinery. Therefore no expense was too great. Encouraged by the success, Minh Mạng ordered the engineers to study and develop steam engines and steamers to equip his naval fleets. At the end of Minh Mạng 's reign there were 3 steamers produced named Yến Phi, Vân Phi and Vụ Phi. However, his successor could not maintain the industry due to financial problems, worsened by many years of social unrest under his rule.

== Images ==
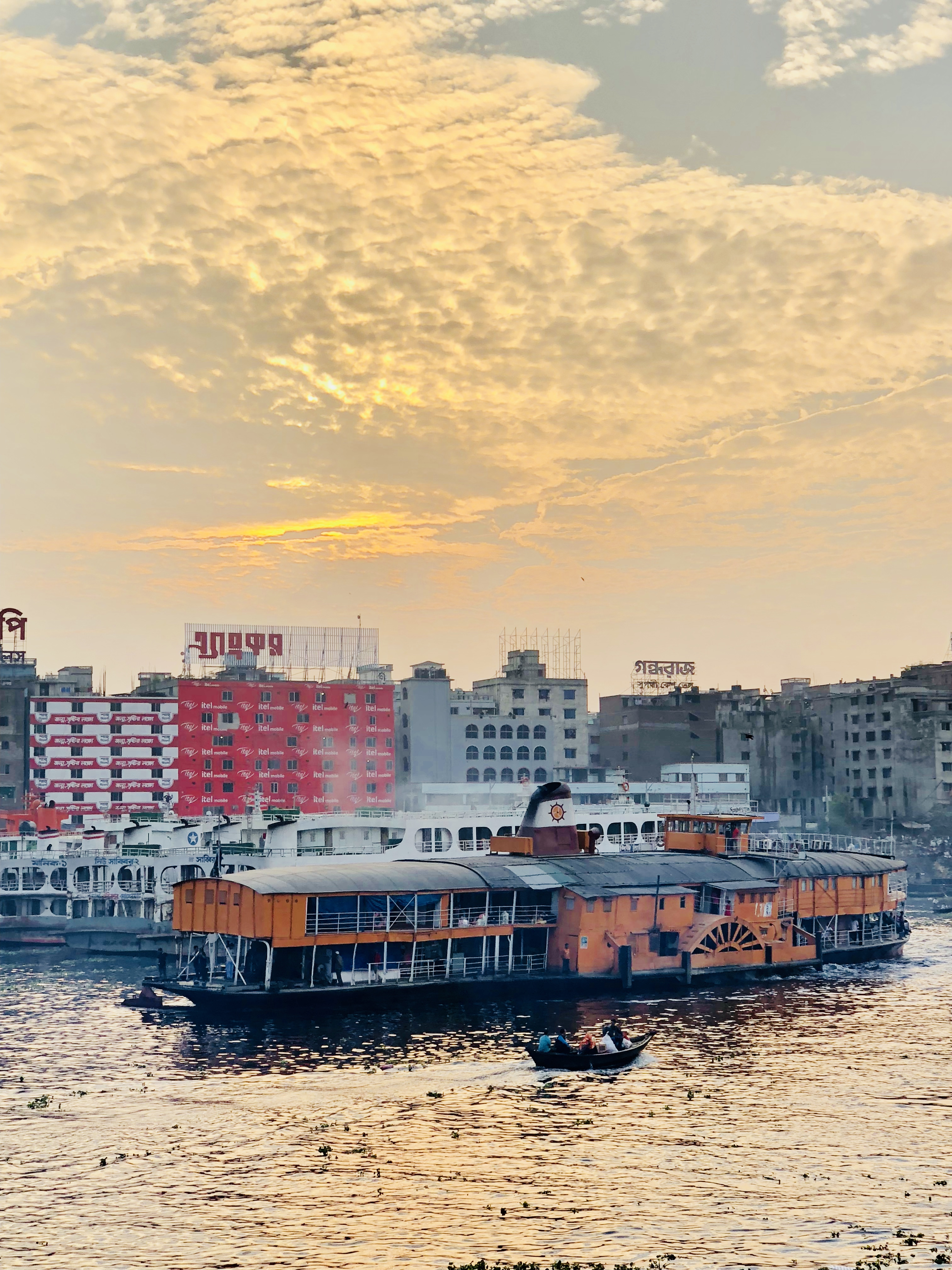
Rocket paddle steamer off Dhaka, Bangladesh

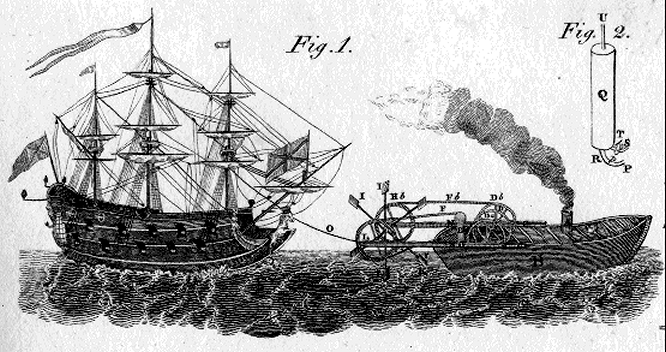
1736 steamboat English patent.

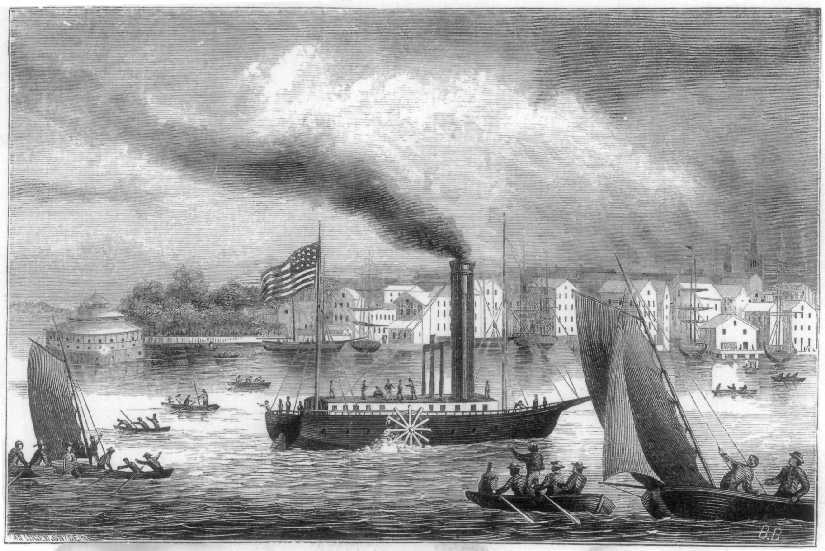
Robert Fulton's Clermont.

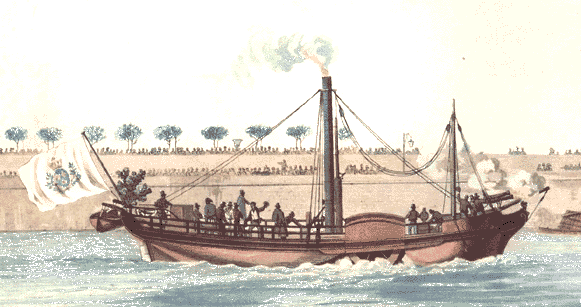
The Élise (ex Scottish-built Marjorie).

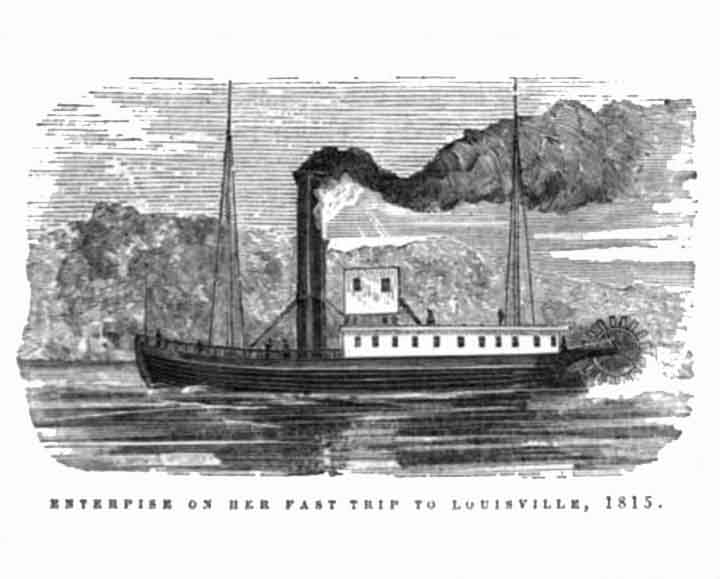
"Enterprise on her fast trip to Louisville, 1815"

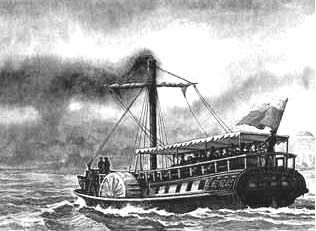
Elizaveta, The first Russian steamship, 1815

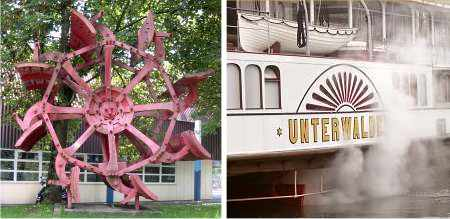
Left: original paddlewheel from a paddle steamer on the lake of Lucerne. Right: detail of a steamer.

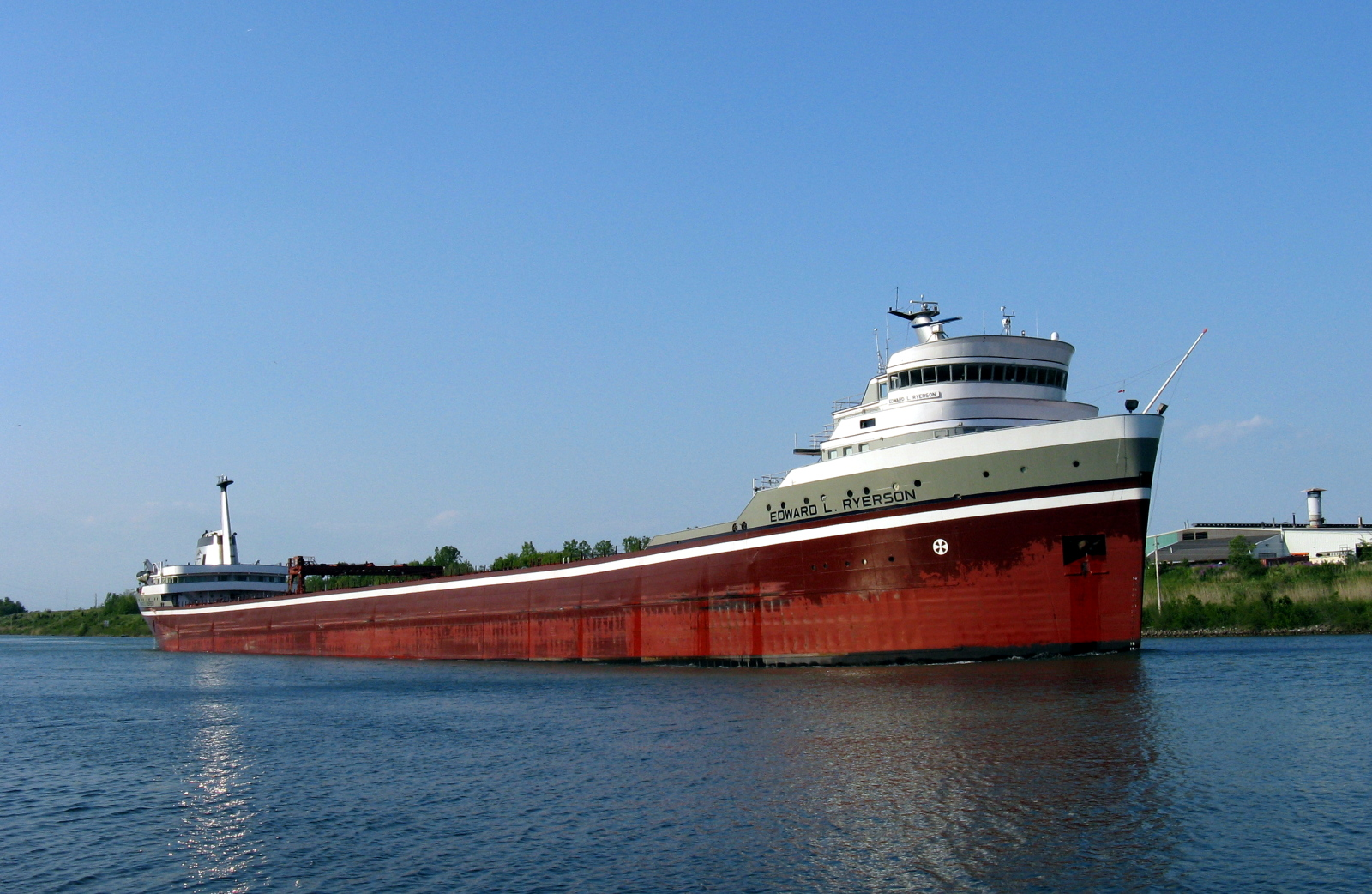
730-foot lake freighter Edward L Ryerson

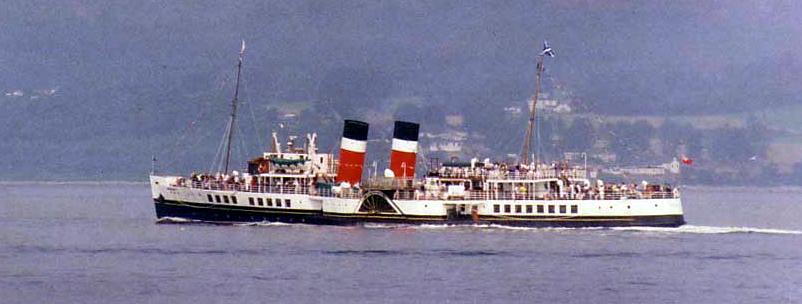
Paddle steamer PS Waverley steaming down the Firth of Clyde.

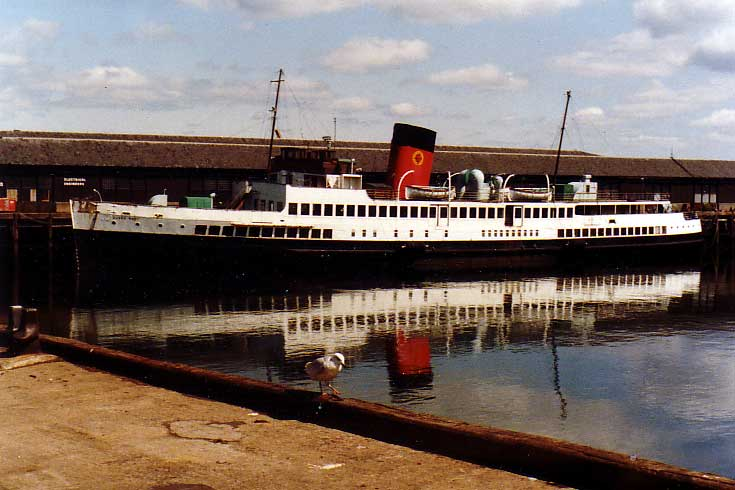
Turbine steamer TS Queen Mary.

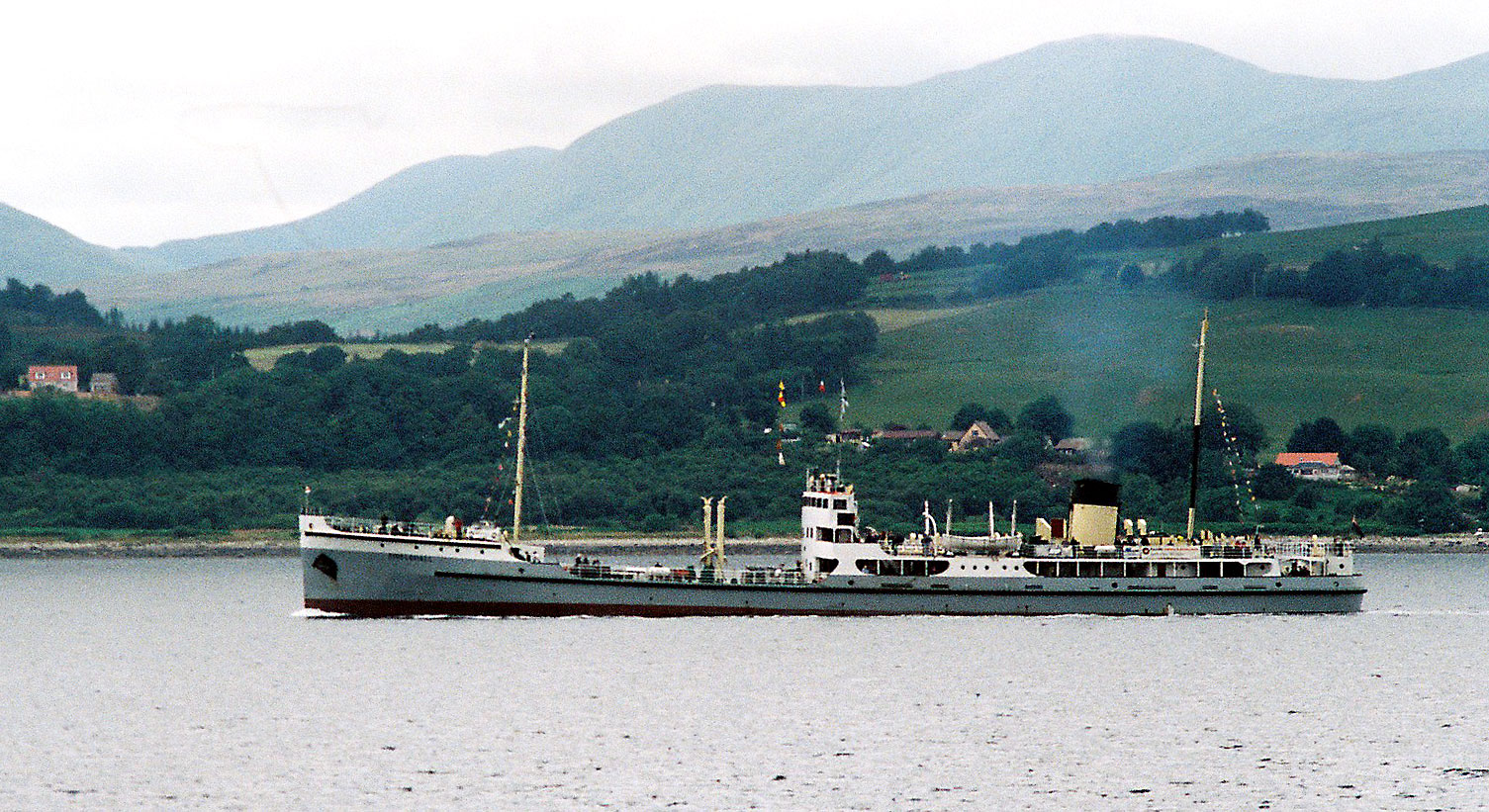
SS Shieldhall steams down the Firth of Clyde.

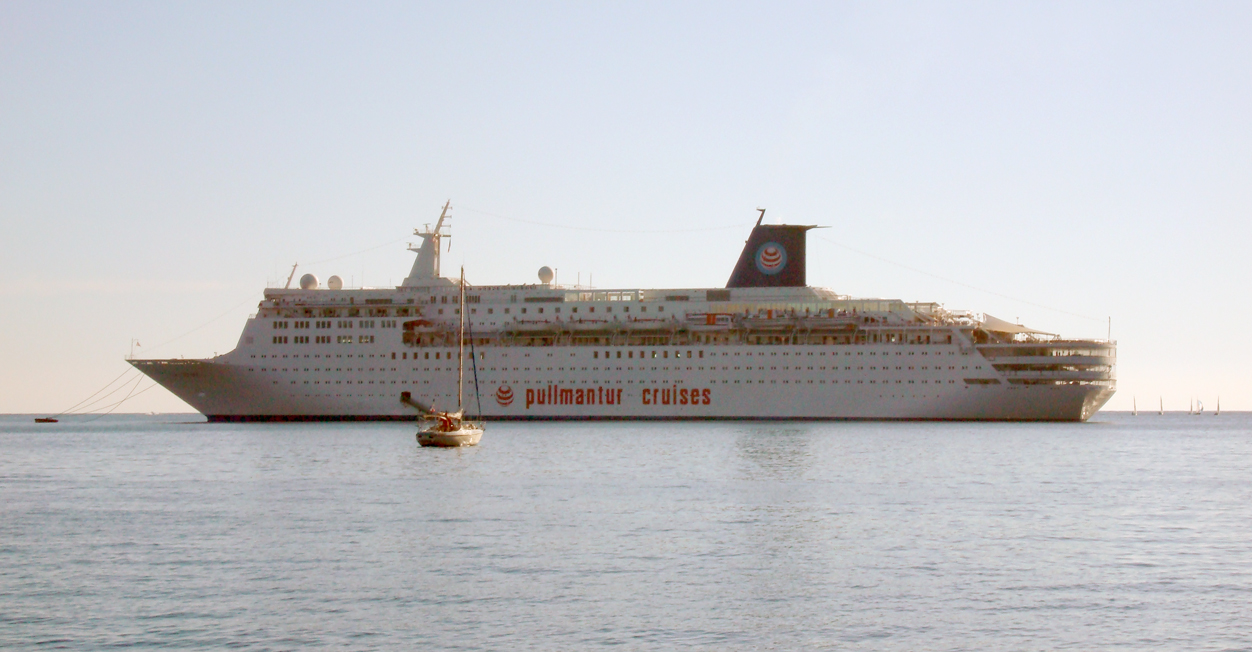
Sky Wonder last steam-powered cruise ship built 1984

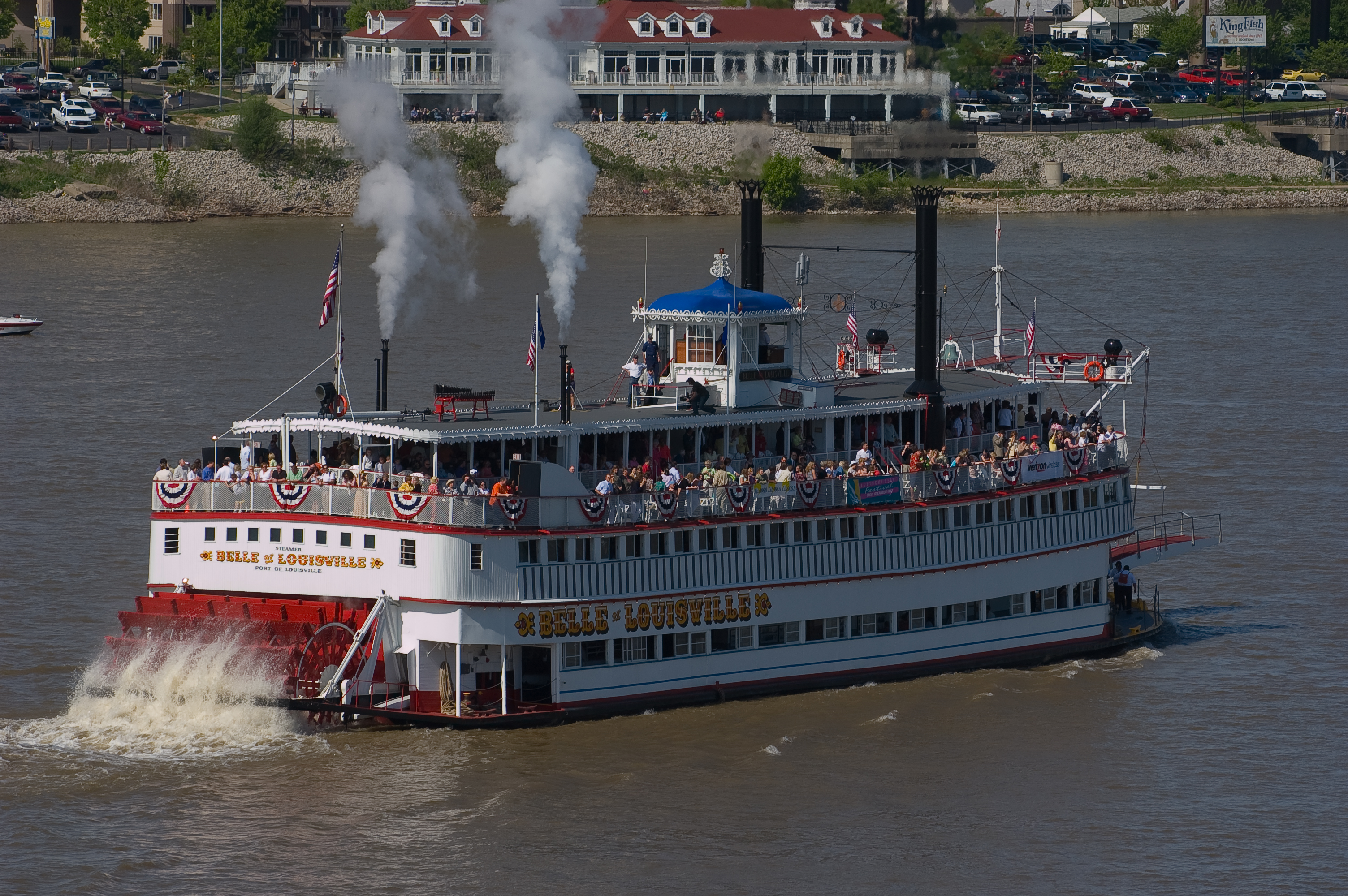
Belle of Louisville

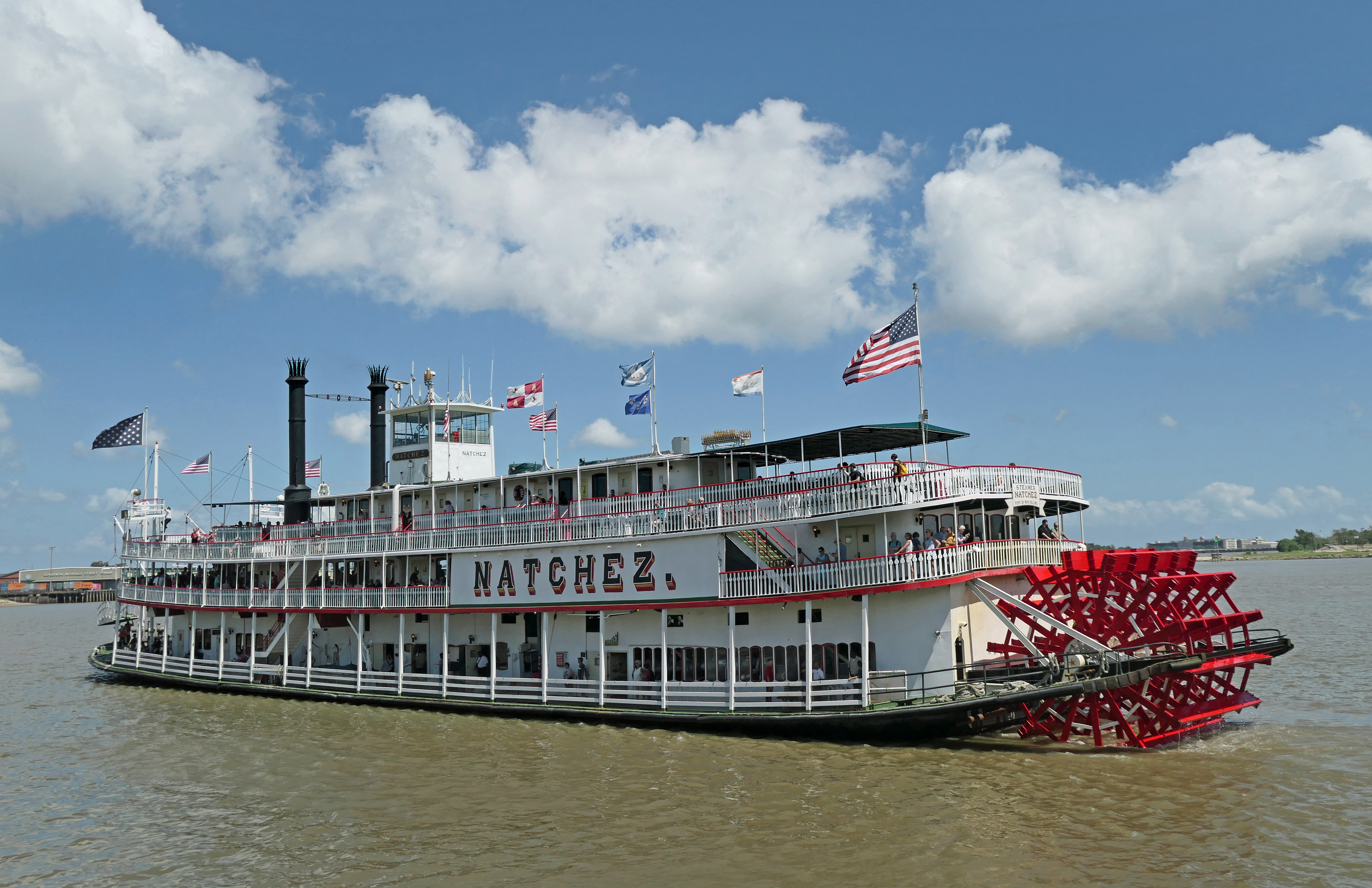
Natchez

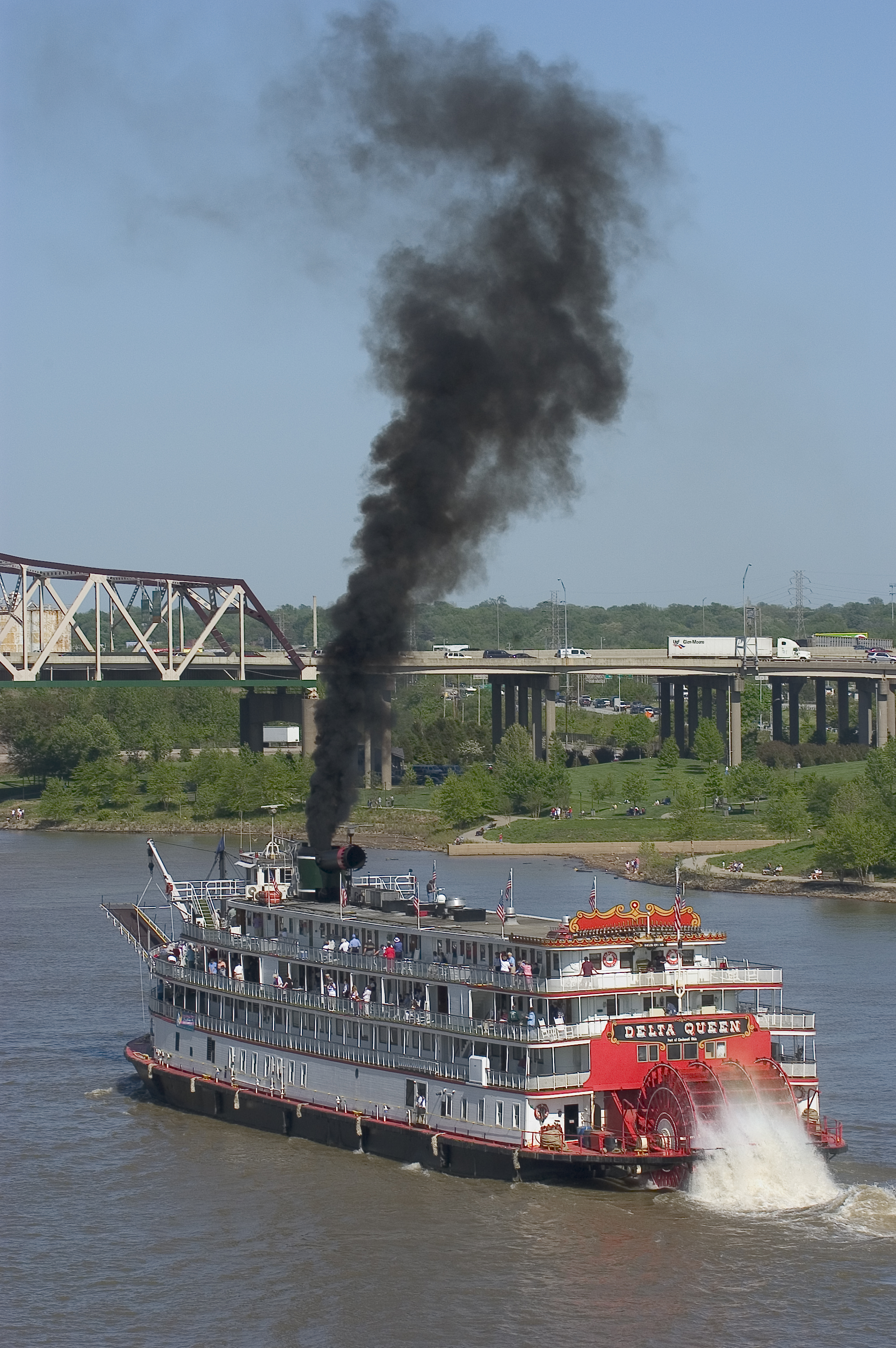
Delta Queen racing

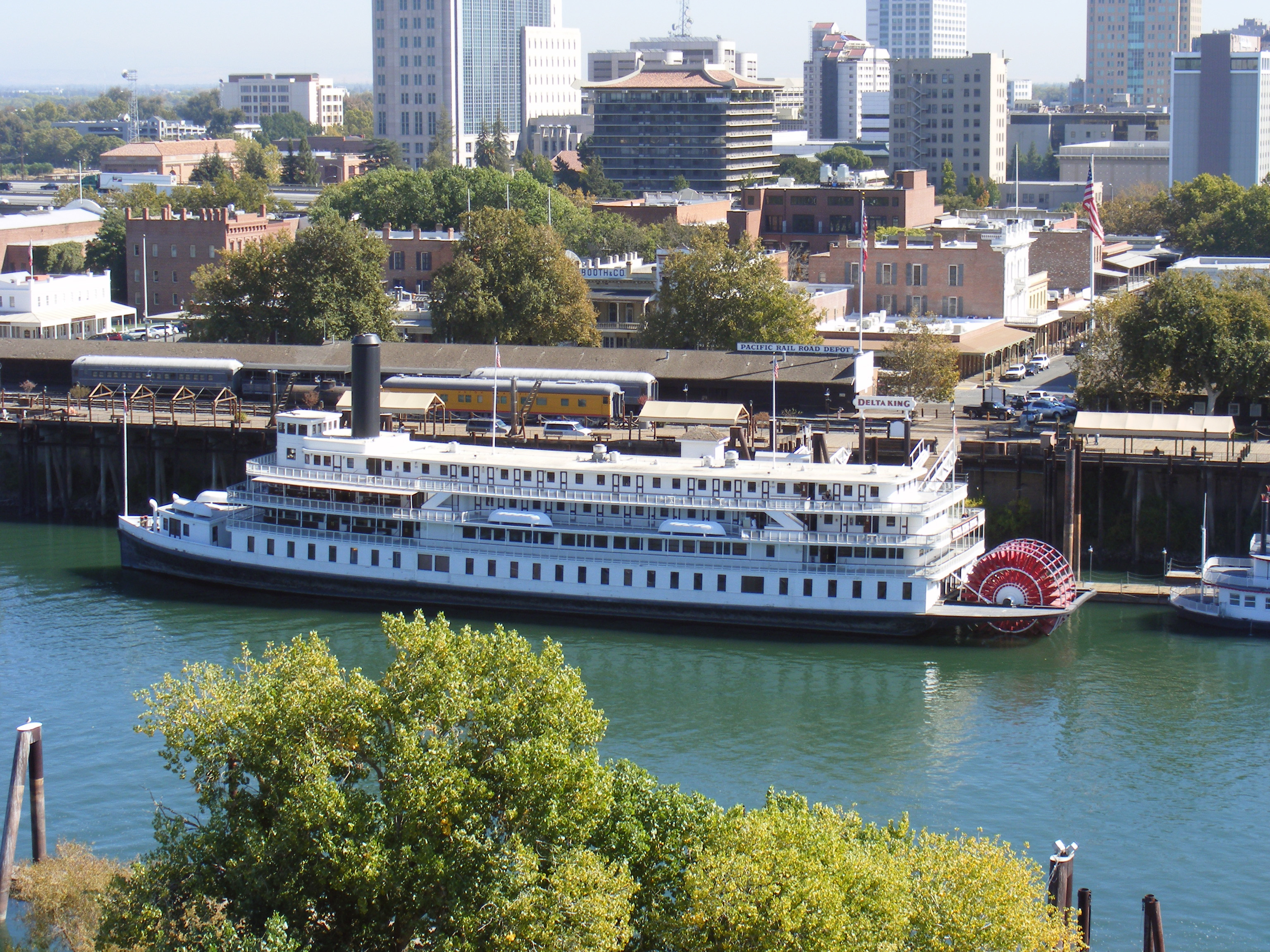
Delta King

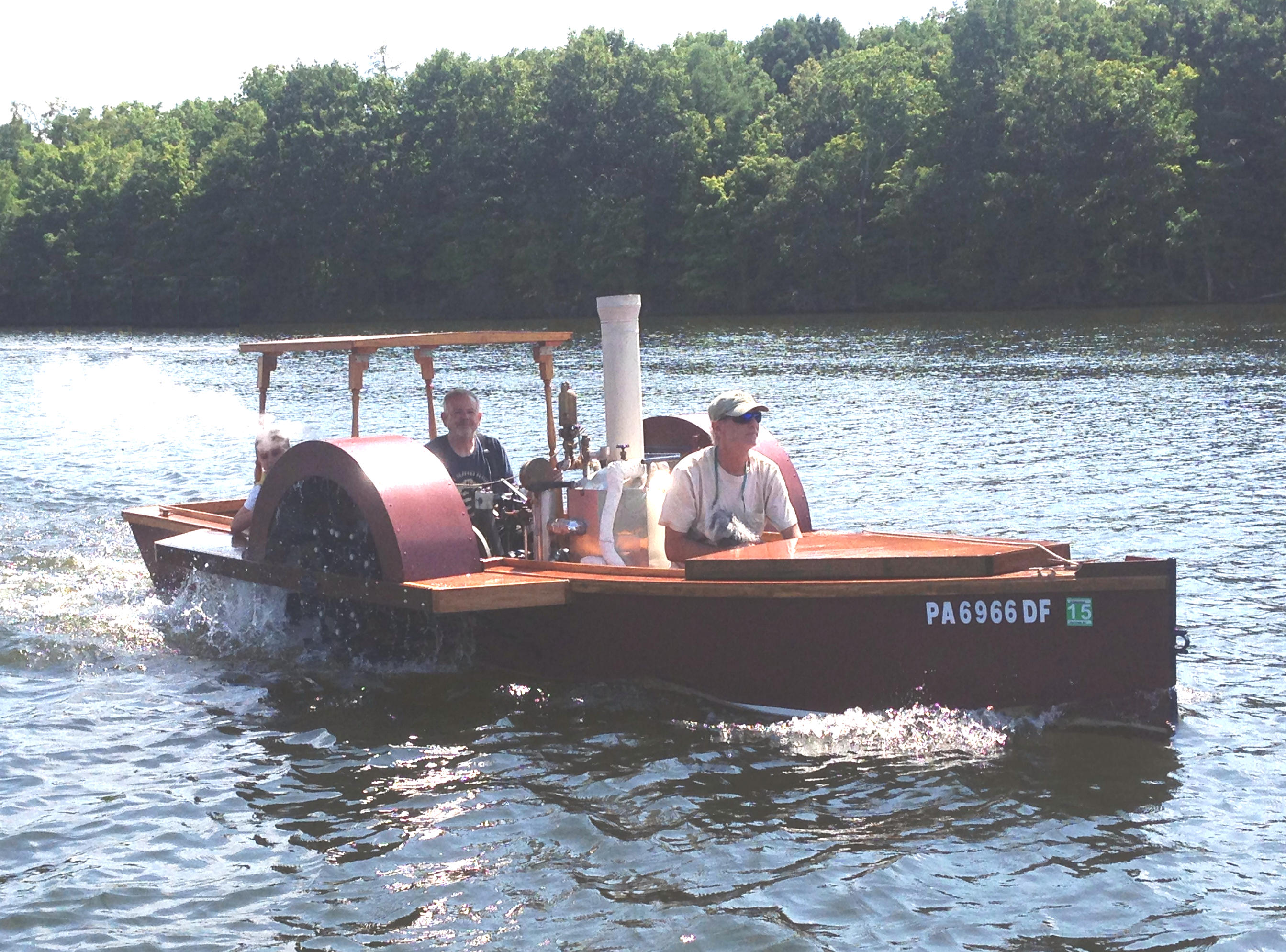
Steam Sidewheeler

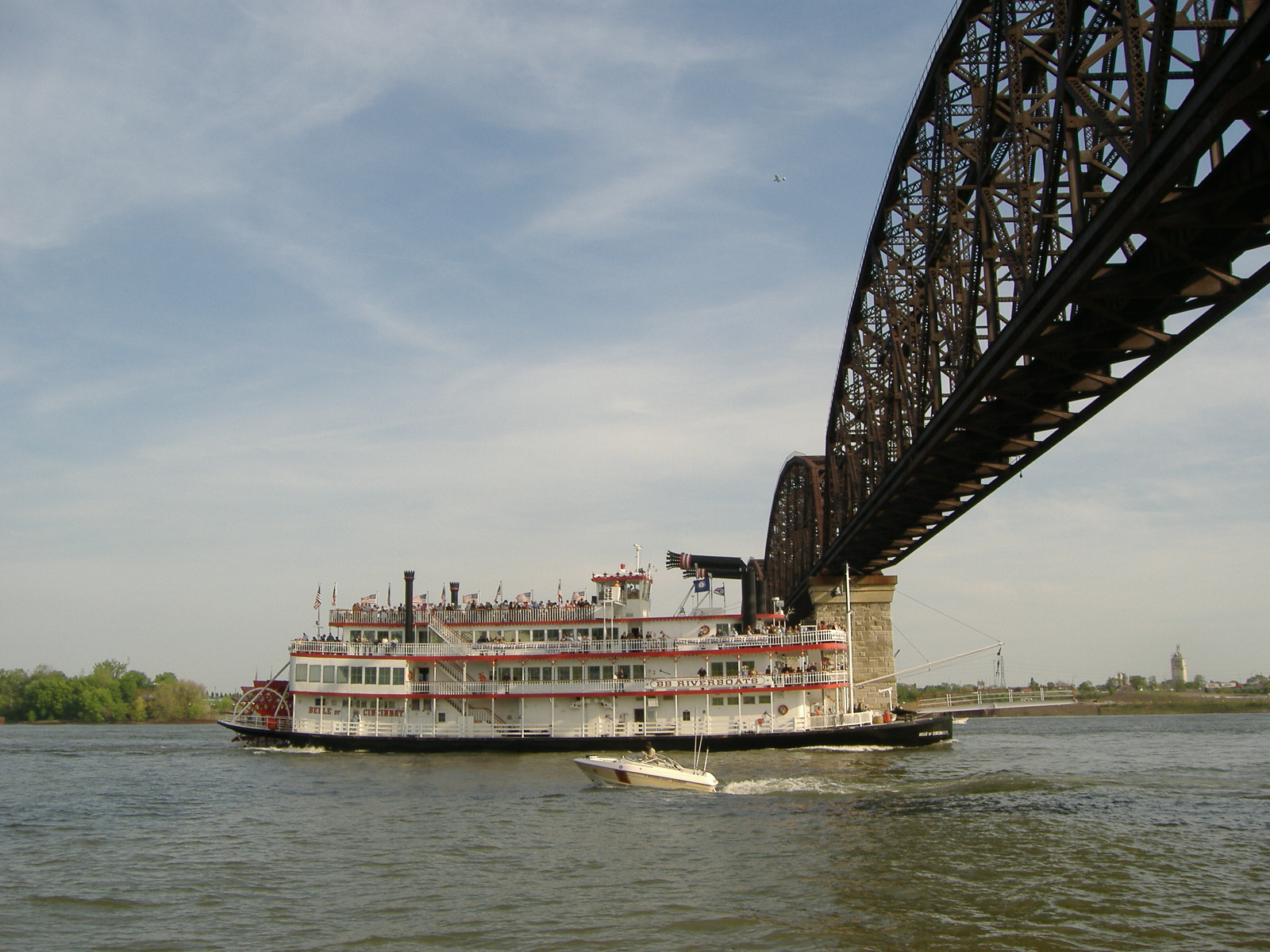
Belle of Cincinnati, a participant in the Great Steamboat Race

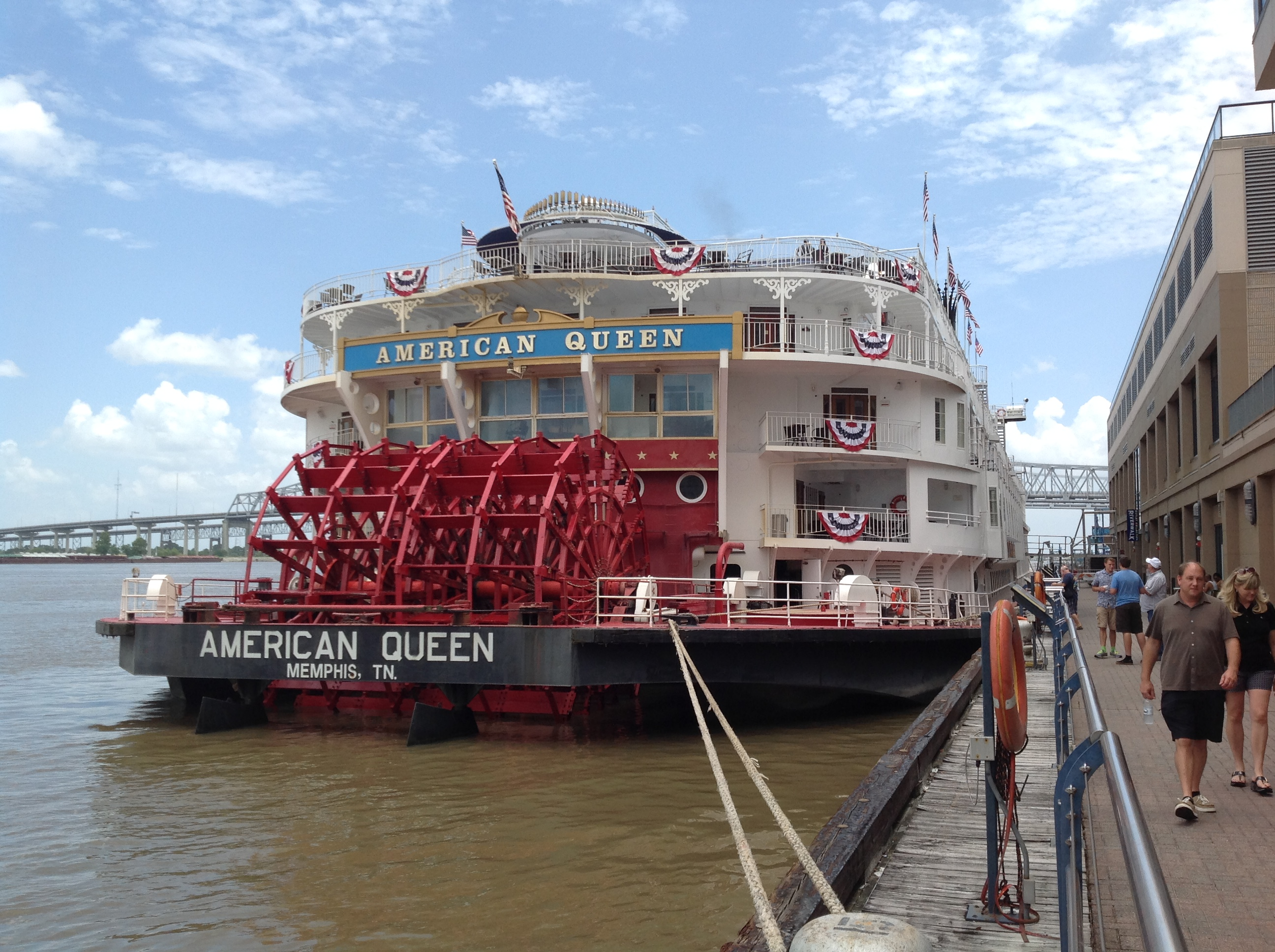
American Queen docked at the Riverwalk in 2015

== See also ==
- Allan Line Royal Mail Steamers
- Chain boat navigation
- Charles Baird, engineer who was responsible for Russia's first steamboat.
- Howard Steamboat Museum
- List of steamboats on the Columbia River
- Lists of ships
- Motor ship or Motor vessel, a ship propelled by an engine, usually a diesel engine. The name of motor ships are often prefixed with MS, M/S, MV or M/V.
- Murray-Darling steamboats
- Naphtha launch
- President, a preserved English steam narrowboat
- PS Rising Star
- Riverboat
- Steam Navigation Company, a list of companies that share the name
- Steam-powered vessels
- Steam yacht
- Steamship
- Steamship Historical Society of America
- Tourist sternwheelers of Oregon

== External references ==
- McCrorie, Ian (1986), Clyde Pleasure Steamers, Greenock: Orr, Pollock & Co, ISBN 1-869850-00-9.
- Pattinson, GH (1981), The Great Age of Steam on Windermere, Windermere Nautical Trust, ISBN 0-907796-00-1.

== Bibliography ==
- Jordan, Francis (1910). The life of William Henry, of Lancaster, Pennsylvania, 1729-1786: patriot, military officer, inventor of the steamboat; a contribution to revolutionary history. Press of the New era printing company.
- Rolt, L. T. C. (1963). Thomas Newcomen; the prehistory of the steam engine. David and Charles Publishers.
- Rolt, L. T. C.; Allen, John Scott (1977). The steam engine of Thomas Newcomen. Moorland Pub. Co. ISBN 978-0-88202-171-3.
