= Belle of Louisville =

Steamboat owned and operated by the city of Louisville, Kentucky

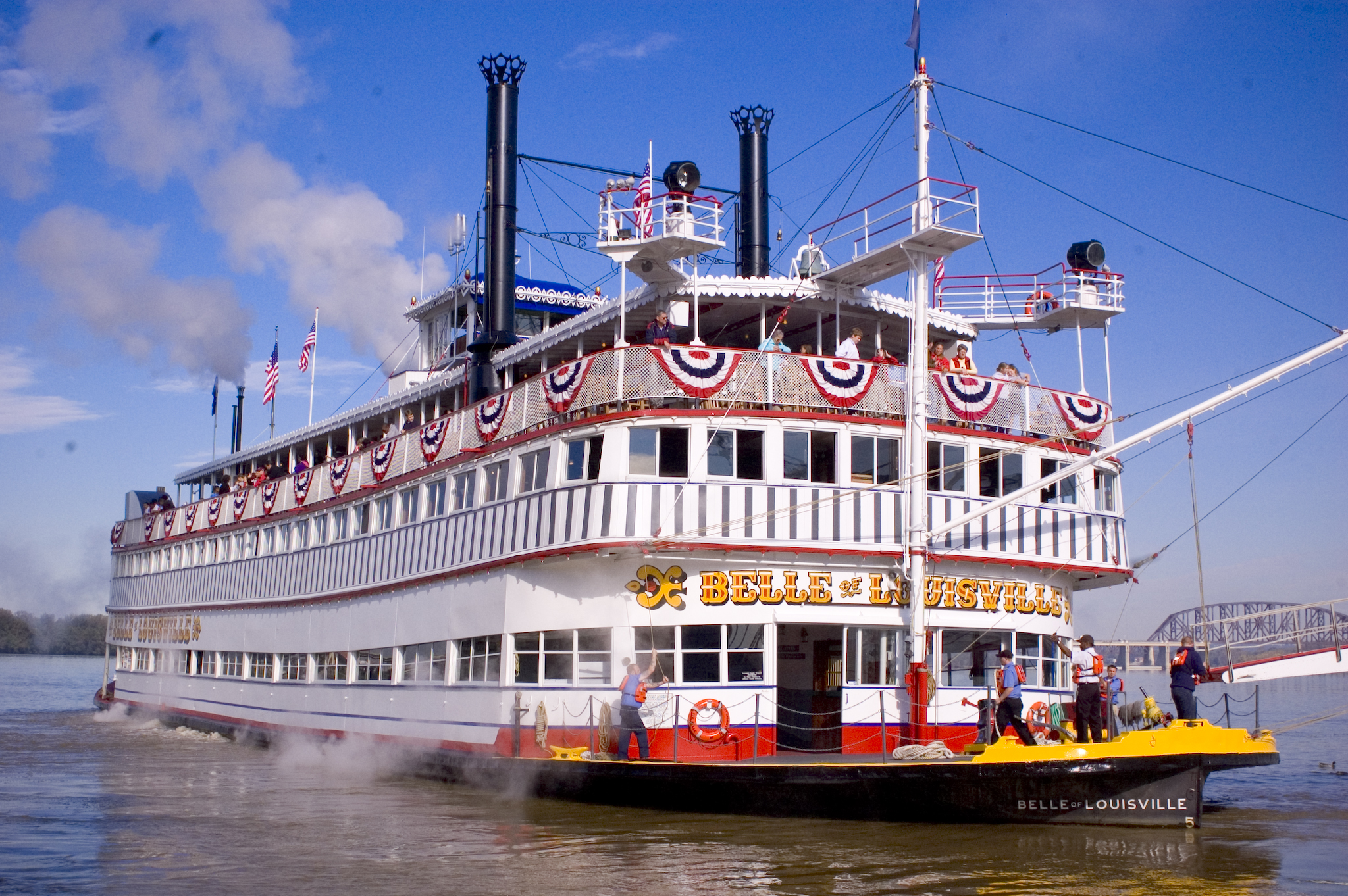

History
- Name: Idlewild (1914–1947); Avalon (1947–c. 1962); Belle of Louisville (c. 1962–)
- Owner: West Memphis Packet Company (1914–1947); J. Herod Gorsage (1947–c. 1962); Marlow Cook (c. 1962–); City of Louisville, Kentucky
- Builder: Rees, James & Sons
- Launched: 1914
- Identification: MMSI number: 367199750; Callsign: WF6270

General characteristics
- Length: 157.5 ft (48.0 m) pre-1968; 167.5 ft (51.1 m) post-1968
- Beam: 36 ft (11 m)
- Depth: 5 ft (1.5 m)
- Decks: 3
- Propulsion: Stern paddle wheel
- Belle of Louisville (River Steamboat)
- U.S. National Register of Historic Places
- U.S. National Historic Landmark
- Location: Louisville, Kentucky
- Coordinates: 38°15′33.2″N 85°45′20.2″W
- Built: 1914
- Architect: Rees, James & Sons
- Website: belleoflouisville.org
- NRHP reference No.: 72000535

Significant dates
- Added to NRHP: April 10, 1972
- Designated NHL: June 30, 1989

Belle of Louisville is a steamboat owned and operated by the city of Louisville, Kentucky, and moored at its downtown wharf next to the Riverfront Plaza/Belvedere during its annual operational period. The steamboat claims itself the "most widely traveled river steamboat in American history." Belle of Louisville's offices are aboard Mayor Andrew Broaddus, and also appears on the list of National Historic Landmarks.

== History ==
=== Idlewild ===
Originally named Idlewild, the Belle of Louisville was built by James Rees & Sons Company in Pittsburgh, Pennsylvania, for the West Memphis Packet Company in 1914. She initially operated as a passenger ferry between Memphis, Tennessee, and West Memphis, Arkansas. She also hauled cargo such as cotton, lumber, and grain. She then came to Louisville in 1931 and ran trips between the Fontaine Ferry amusement park near downtown Louisville and Rose Island, a resort about 14 miles (23 km) upriver from Louisville. From 1934 through World War II, Idlewild operated a regular excursion schedule. During this time she was outfitted with special equipment to push oil barges along the river. She also served as a floating USO nightclub for troops stationed at military bases along the Mississippi River.

=== Avalon ===
In 1947, Idlewild was sold to J. Herod Gorsage in Cincinnati and renamed Avalon, honoring the death-bed wish of her long-time captain, Master Ben Winters. Over the next few years, Avalon visited ports all along the Mississippi, Missouri, St. Croix, Illinois, Kanawha, Ohio, and Cumberland Rivers. Her many stops included Omaha, Nebraska; Stillwater, Minnesota; Montgomery, West Virginia; and Nashville, Tennessee.

While river technology played an integral role in Louisville during the early 19th century, that relationship declined as railways and roads began to dominate the riverfront. Avalon fell into disrepair. Then, in 1962 Jefferson County Judge Marlow Cook purchased the steamboat for $34,000 in hopes of reconnecting the city's people to the waterfront. Soon, the city re-christened her the Belle of Louisville. The steamboat's purchase played a crucial role in restoring Waterfront Park along with Louisville's relationship to the Ohio River.

=== Restoration ===
The restoration of the boat was supervised by marine architect Alan L. Bates (now Captain Bates), whose book, Str. Belle of Louisville, (1964) remains a primary source on the history of the boat and the crews who worked on her.

Prior to the auction, the hull had been condemned as unfit by the U.S. Coast Guard: concrete patches had added much weight to the oft-damaged hull, as had generations of accumulated modifications to the decks and fittings within her superstructure. These were stripped and repaired in dry dock or removed by volunteers.

What remained was cleaned, surface prepared, supplied with new finish carpentry, and painted in a style consistent with the boat's early 20th-century origins.

Captain Clarke "Doc" Hawley, had worked aboard the boat during her Avalon days. He had salvaged the brass nameplates from the ends of the two massive cylinders in order to prevent them from being sold for scrap, and now he returned them to the boat. Hawley had also, before the auction, at his own cost hired an assistant to drain the boat's water-filled fittings for winter, so that they would not freeze and burst. This meant that the mechanical restoration of the boat was now possible, at far less cost than had extensive refitting of ruined pipe work been necessary.

Various of her workings, though not her engine and drive train, had been stripped and sold in separate lots at auction, including the boat's original steam calliope.

Volunteers donated materials which could be adapted to use. Some of them, such as brass steam-powered bilge clearing pumps known as siphons, were cannibalized from sunken steamboats whose hulls could still be seen and dived at low water. Some missing components were custom-fabricated by local foundries in a style copied from photos of the boat in her earlier days. The degree of preservation was considerable, and the boat is still piloted with a 19th-century skill set, though now with the assistance of modern communications.

Although authentic to its core, the boat has occasionally seen improvements not part of the original restoration. The compressed-air driven calliope which replaced the missing original proved unsatisfying, and was ultimately replaced with the true steam calliope which the boat uses today, audible for many blocks in the surrounding Downtown Louisville area when the boat is readying to depart. The new calliope was built by Morecraft Manufacturing of Peru, Indiana and installed in 1988. The instrument is a reproduction of the Nichol instrument that the boat carried when named Avalon.

The ship's bow was also redesigned by Bates in the late 1960s, to make the boat a better contender in the Great Steamboat Race: the original, blunter bow at maximum speeds showed the tendency for waves to break over it.

=== Career as Belle of Louisville ===
On April 30, 1963, Belle of Louisville made her first cruise in a race against the steamboat Delta Queen. That race was the beginning of an unparalleled river tradition. To this day, Belle of Louisville and another competing steamboat, previously the Delta Queen, still square off every year on the Wednesday before the Kentucky Derby in the Kentucky Derby Festival event The Great Steamboat Race.

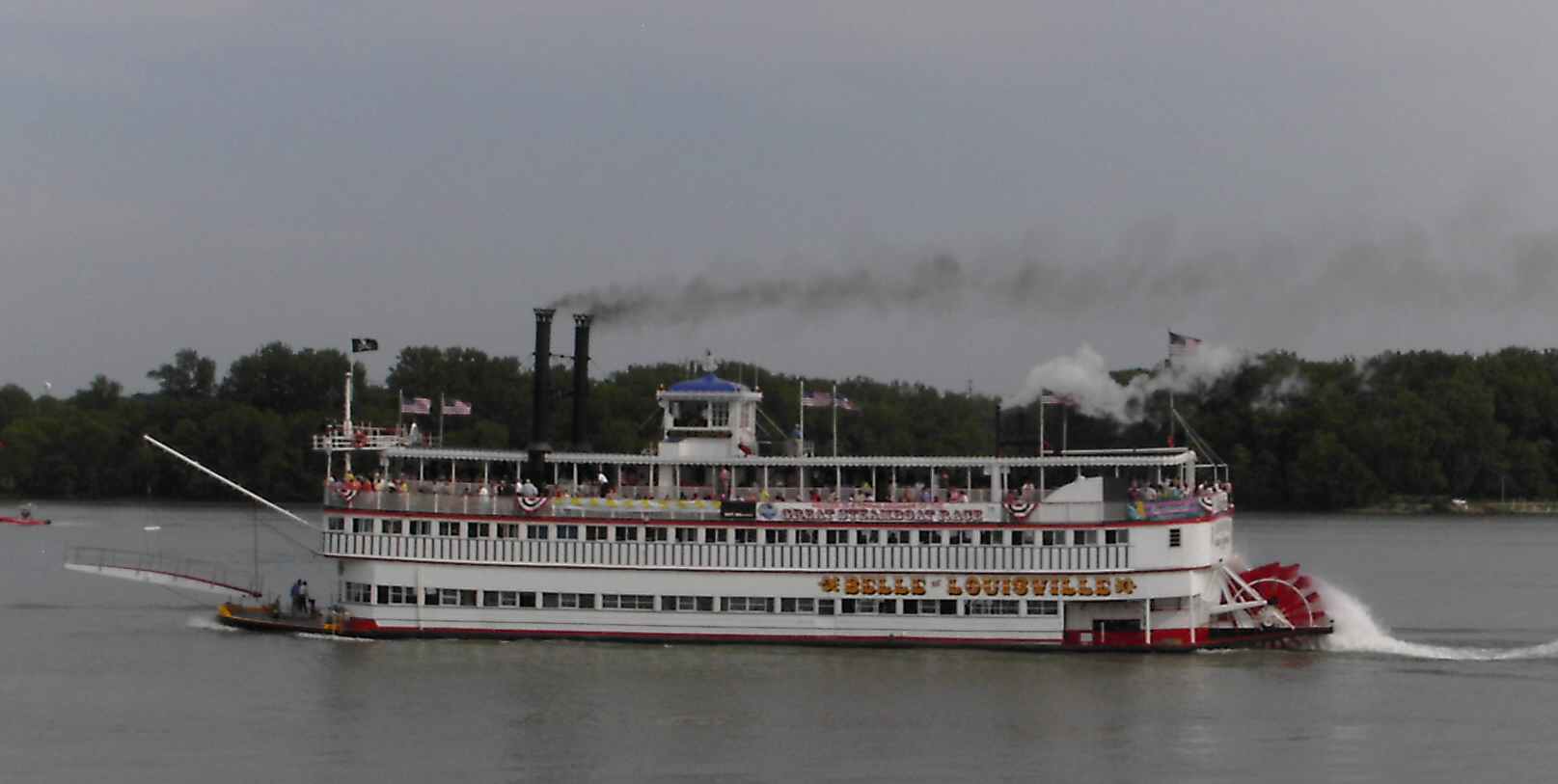
Belle of Louisville flying the Jolly Roger during the 2006 Great Steamboat Race

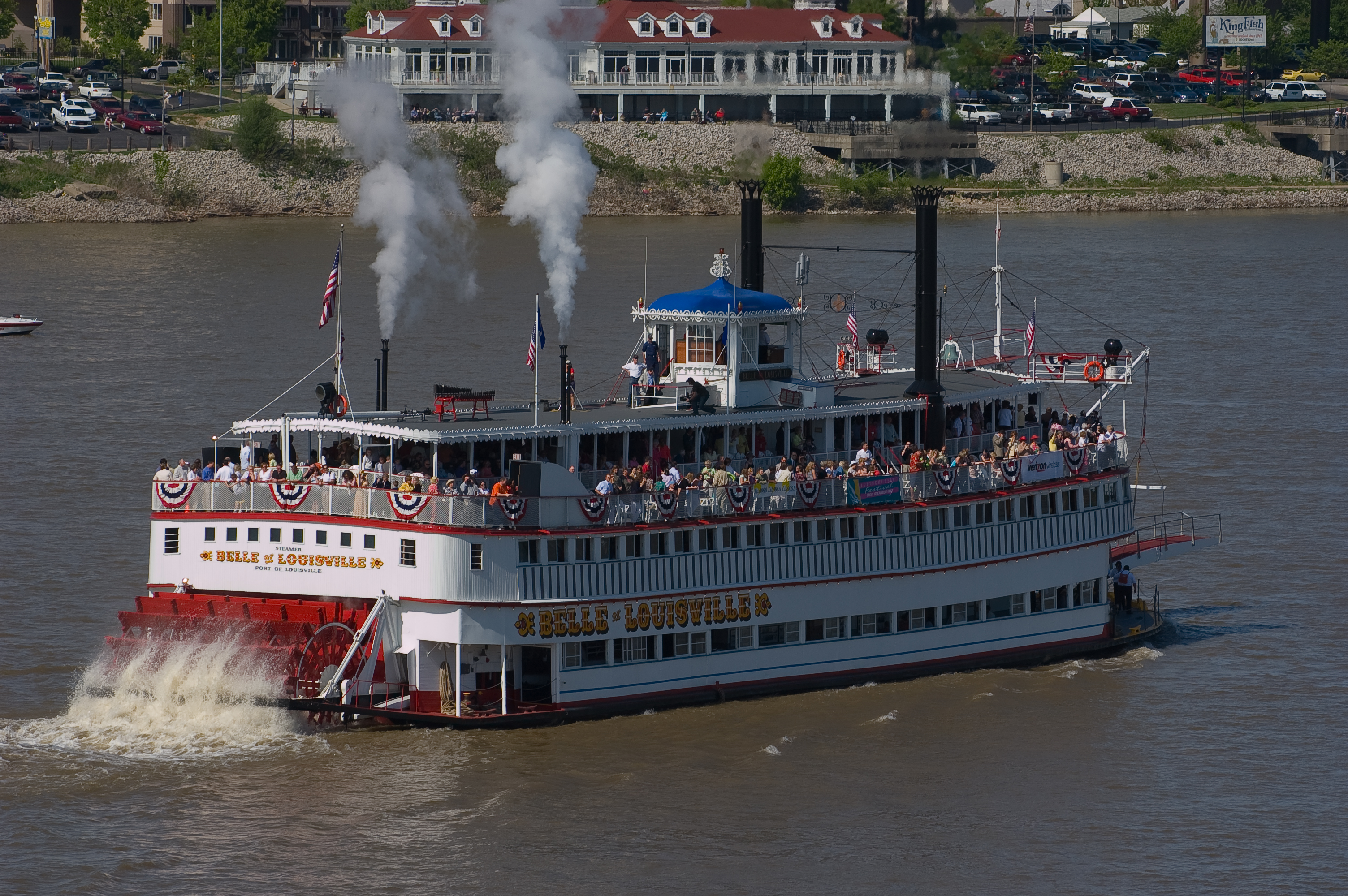
Belle of Louisville at the start of the 2004 Great Steamboat Race

Thousands of spectators line both sides of the river to watch the race: on the first occasion of the running of the race, attendance exceeded that of the Kentucky Derby the same year. Originally, Kentucky Derby officials were said to be reluctant to accept the steamboat race as part of the Derby celebrations, as in old betting parlance, a "boat race" refers to a horse race with an outcome influenced by dishonest means. According to Louisville folklore, the race may be rigged, but insiders insist that cheating is impossible, because the race has no rules—the only prizes are bragging rights and a pair of gilded deer antlers, which are mounted above the forecastle of the winning boat.

Today, Belle of Louisville is recognized as the oldest river steamboat in operation, placed on the National Register of Historic Places in 1972, and designated a National Historic Landmark in 1989.

The annual Forecastle Festival is one of many examples of how Belle of Louisville has impacted several events throughout the city of Louisville. Although the music festival takes place in mid-July in Waterfront Park during the day carrying over into the late evening, Belle of Louisville acts as the venue for the after shows and parties that are specifically for Forecastle VIP ticket holders. During these after shows and parties, select performers act as the entertainment as people get to experience the environment of Louisville from the perspective of the river while they ride around on Belle of Louisville.

In August 1997, Belle of Louisville was partially sunk at her moorings; a former crew member of the boat was later convicted of sabotage. The proximate cause of the sinking was flooding of the hull via a city water line left connected to a fitting that led into the boat's hull. Due to the swift actions of the steamer's crew and other members of the community, the boat was rescued, repaired, and returned to service.

In February 2007, Mark Doty was named as Belle of Louisville's captain, replacing Kevin Mullen, who left the position in November 2006. Doty's official title is "Master of the Fleet" or "Port Captain".

On October 17, 2009, Belle of Louisville collided with a dock near Six Mile Island on the Ohio River. Witness statements report that the accident occurred as she was making a turnaround about halfway through a cruise. Tugboats were used to pull her to safety. A Belle of Louisville official was quoted as saying that the wind had caused her to hit the dock. It has been reported that one-third of the paddle wheel's bucket planks were damaged in the collision, and jockey bar (the main steel arm, which goes across the aft end of the paddle wheel) was bent. The crew, however, was able to fix the damage without drydocking. The damaged bucket planks were replaced from stock held in storage.

On October 18, 2014, Belle of Louisville turned 100 years old. To celebrate, a 5-day riverboat festival named "The Belle's Big Birthday Bash" was held in Louisville along parts of Louisville Waterfront Park. Eight other riverboats from across the country joined Belle of Louisville to help celebrate her 100th year on the river. The festival incorporated cruises, fireworks, riverfront concerts, hot air balloon glows, and more. The other riverboats attending the festival included Spirit of Jefferson, Anson Northrup, Belle of Cincinnati, The Colonel, General Jackson, River Queen, Spirit of Peoria, and Celebration Belle. This festival was said to be the largest riverboat gathering that Louisville has seen in over 100 years. A portion of the proceeds from The Belle's Big Birthday Bash went toward her preservation fund.

== Belle of Louisville in fiction ==
Belle of Louisville appears as a character (powered by an artificial intelligence) in Rudy Rucker's 1988 novel Wetware, which takes place on the Moon and in Louisville.

== Gallery ==
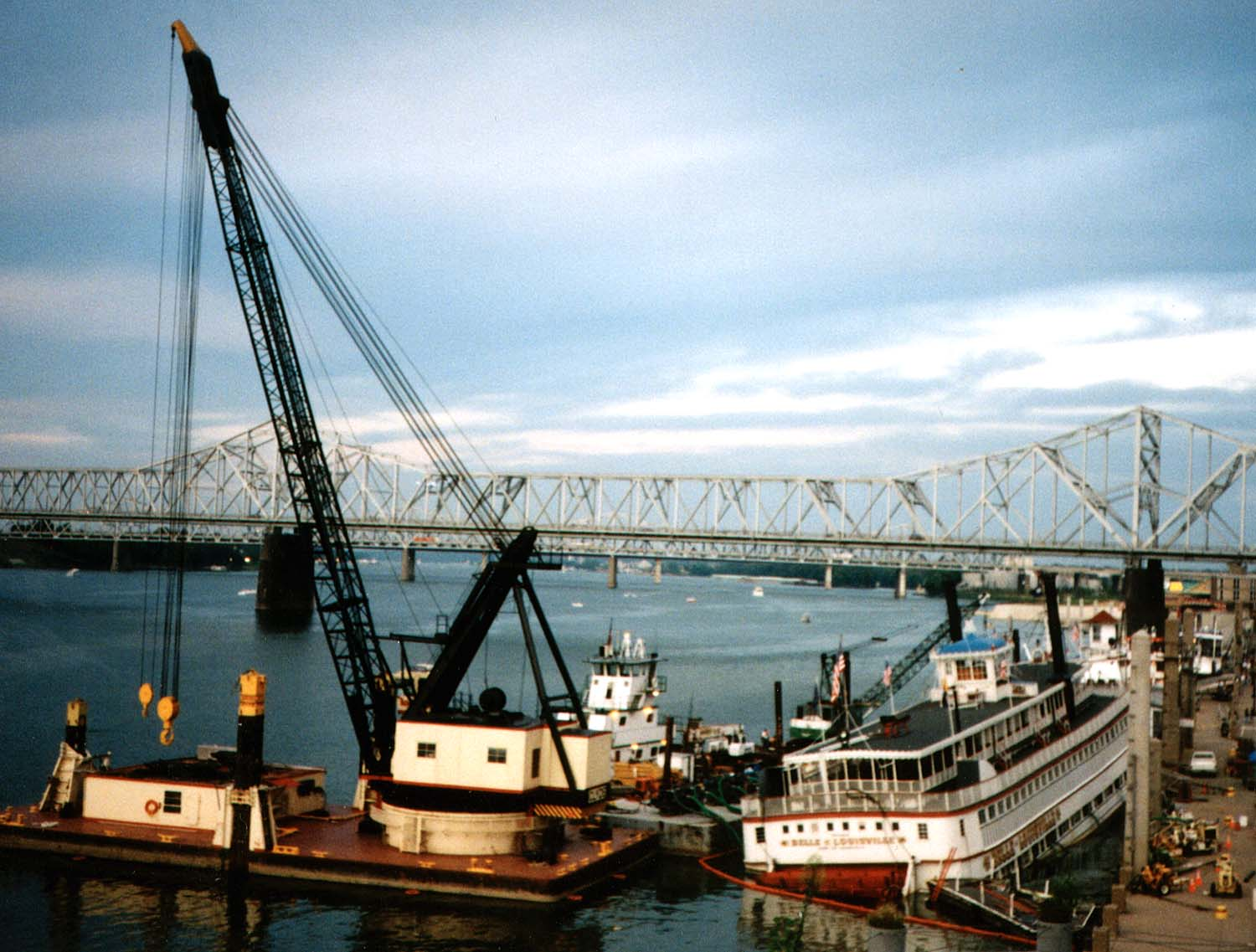
The U.S. Army Corps of Engineers assists in the salvage of Belle of Louisville after the 1997 incident.

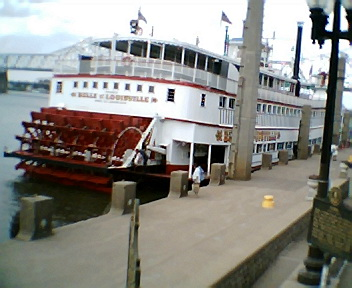
Belle of Louisville at her home, the 4th Street Wharf.

Belle of Louisville docked in Cincinnati by Great American Ballpark.

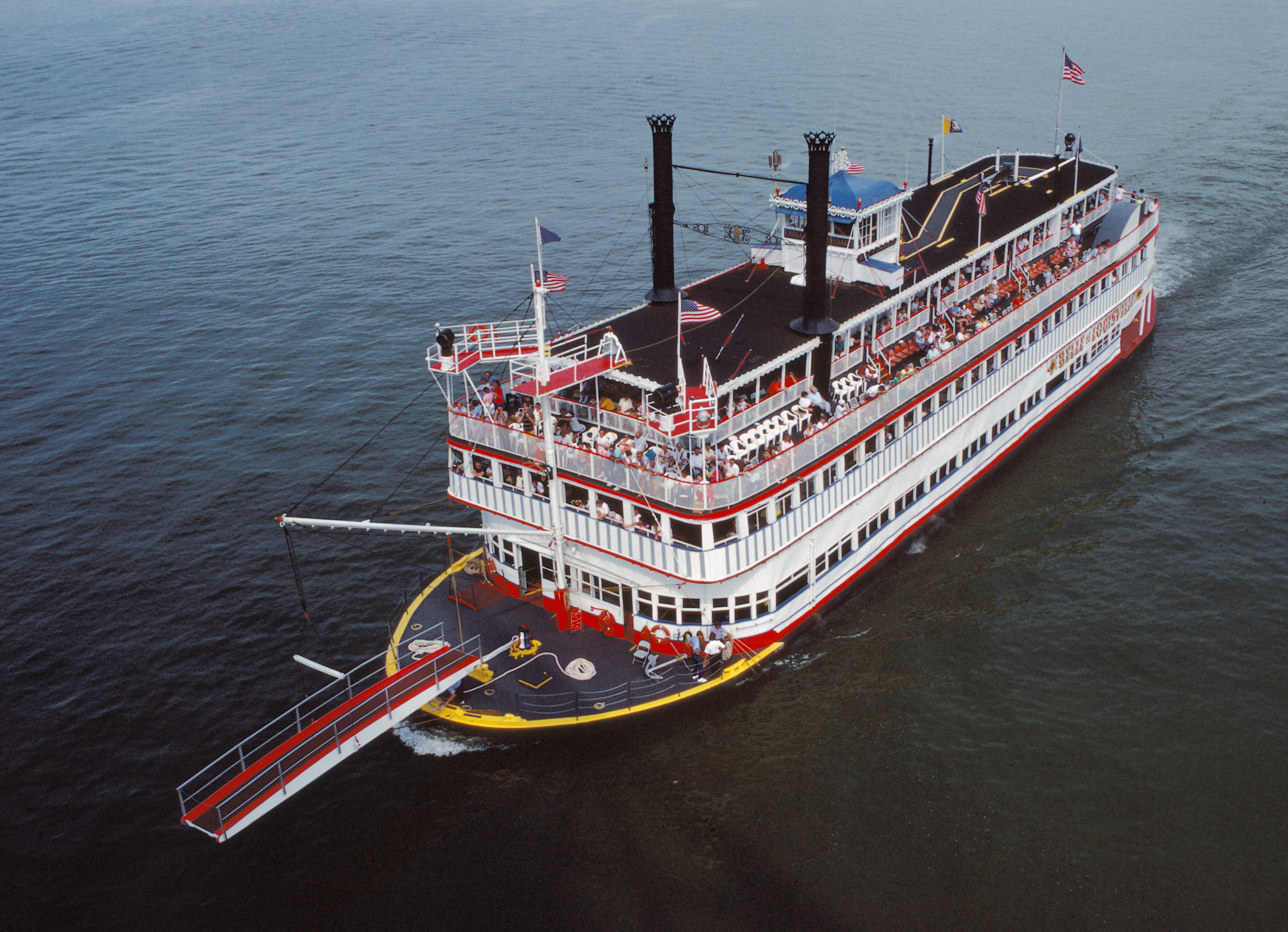
Belle of Louisville at Clark Bridge, Louisville, Kentucky, USA, Ohio River mile 604, August 1987.

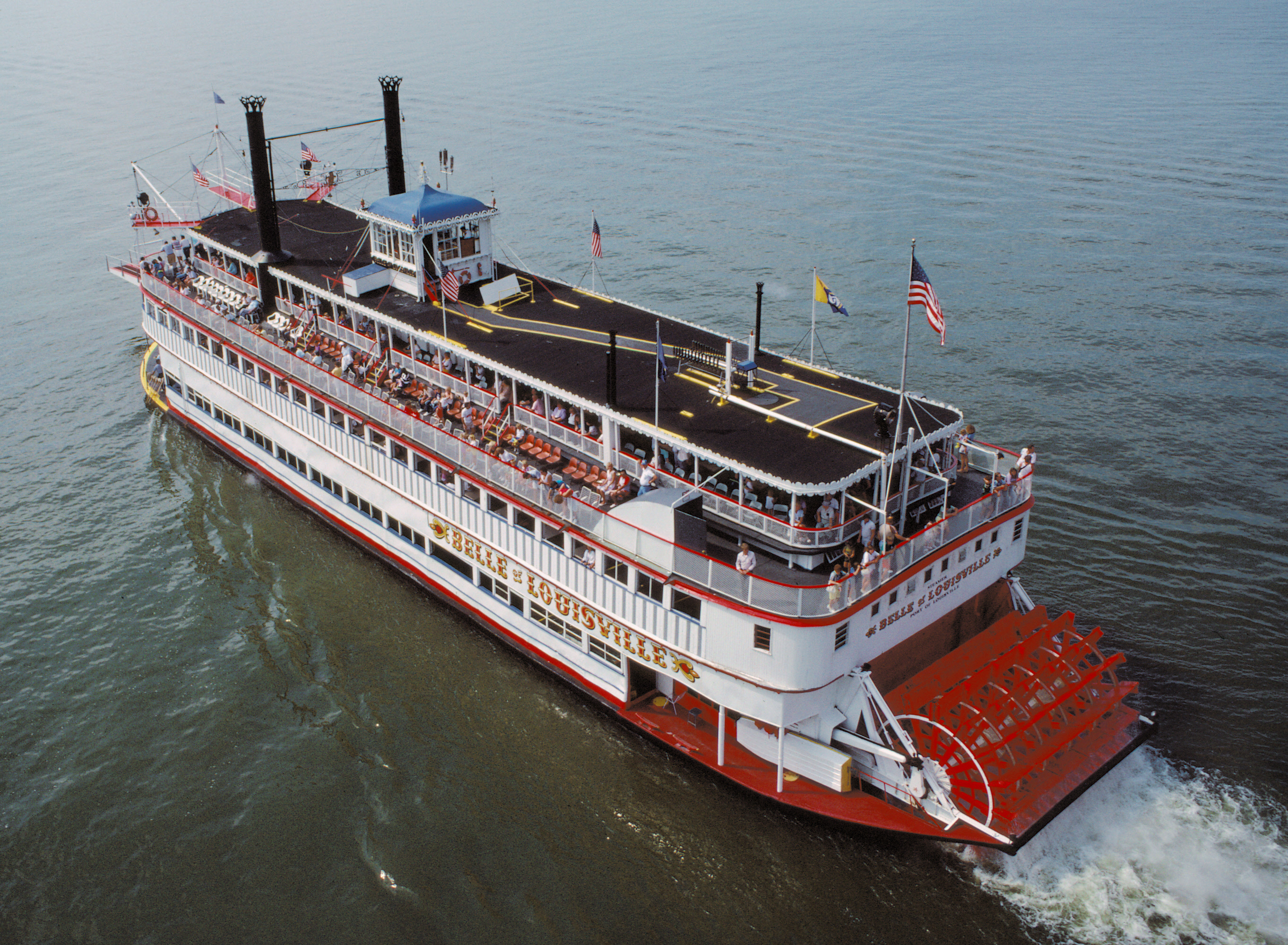
Belle of Louisville at Clark Bridge, Louisville, Kentucky, USA, Ohio River mile 604, August 1987.

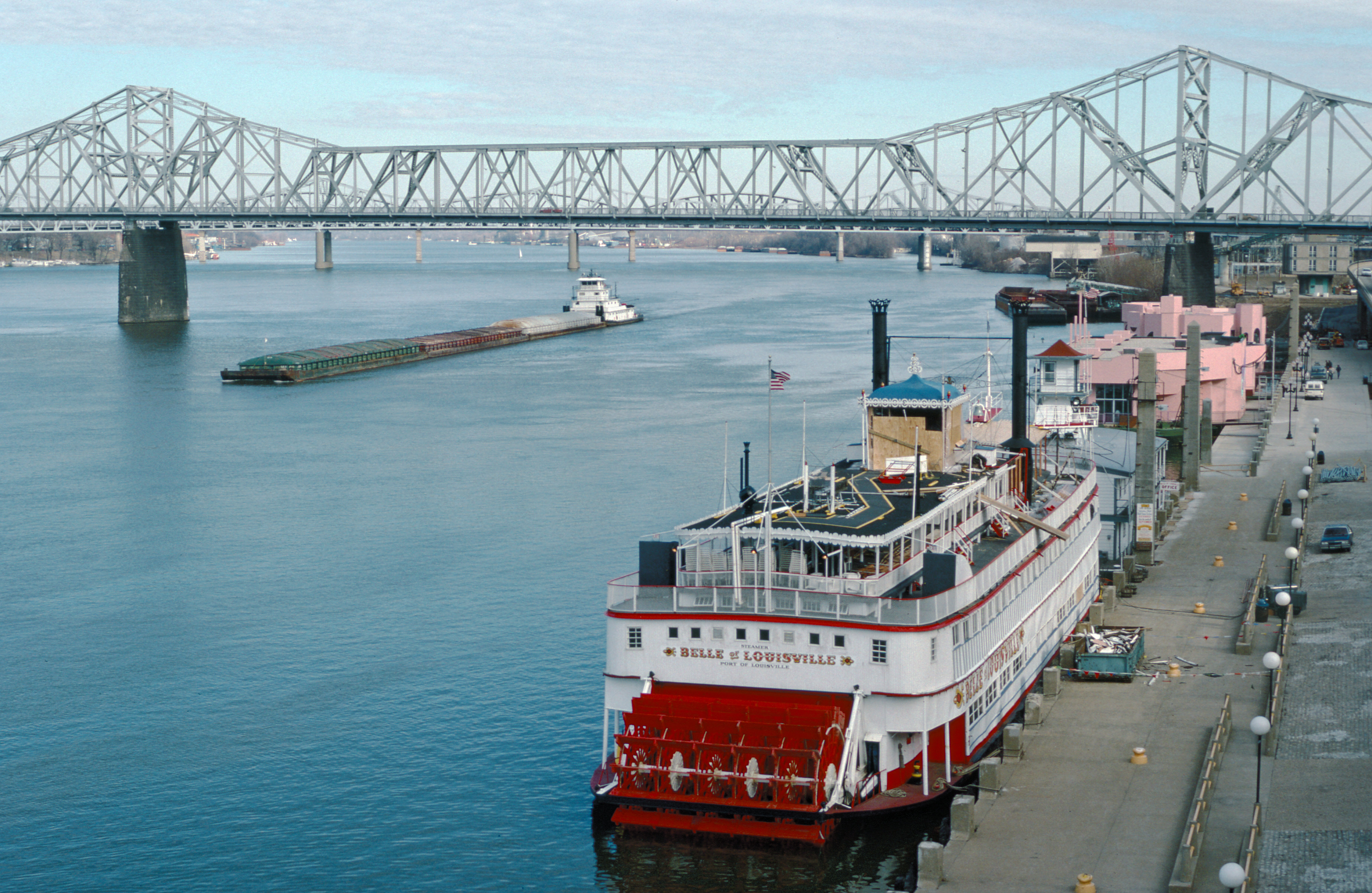
Belle of Louisville at wharf with George Rogers Clark Memorial Bridge in distance, Louisville, Kentucky, USA, Ohio River mile 604, December 1987.

== See also ==
- List of attractions and events in the Louisville metropolitan area
- National Register of Historic Places listings in Downtown Louisville, Kentucky
- List of National Historic Landmarks in Kentucky
