= Julia Belle Swain =

Authentic Mississippi River Sternwheeler

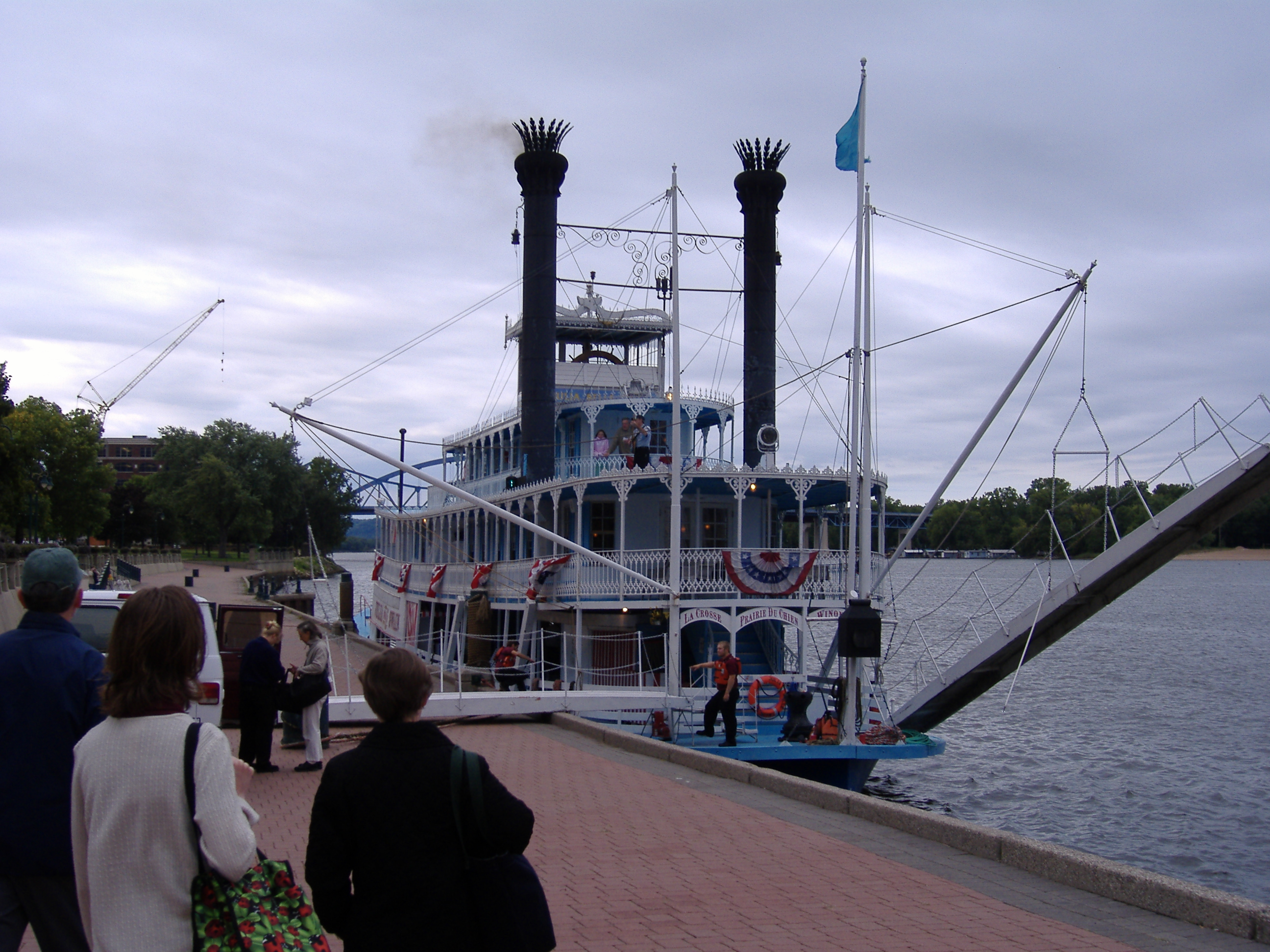
- Julia Belle Swain at La Crosse, 2007

History
- Name: Julia Belle Swain
- Owner: Troy Manthey
- Route: Mississippi river
- Ordered: 1971
- Builder: Dubuque Boat & Boiler Works
- Status: Restoration in dry dock

General characteristics
- Type: Sternwheeler
- Tonnage: 98
- Length: 122.5 ft (37.3 m)
- Beam: molded 23 ft (7.0 m), over guards 26 ft (7.9 m)
- Draft: Water: 3.3 ft (1.0 m); Air: 46.9 ft (14.3 m)
- Depth: 5.7 ft (1.7 m)
- Installed power: Steam
- Capacity: 149

Julia Belle Swain is a steam-powered sternwheeler under restoration in La Crosse, Wisconsin, United States.

Designed and built in 1971 by Capt. Dennis Trone, Julia Belle Swain was the last boat built by Dubuque Boat & Boiler Works of Dubuque, Iowa. The boat's steam engines were built in 1915 by the Gillett and Eaton Company and originally installed on the central wheel ferryboat City of Baton Rouge. The engines have logged well over a million miles.

The steamer prominently featured in various cinematic adaptations of Mark Twain's literary works – firstly in 1973 movie Tom Sawyer (as River Queen), the 1974 movie Huckleberry Finn., and also in the opening and closing titles of the 1979 television series Huckleberry Finn and His Friends.

"Margie"
Performed on the steam calliope of the Str. Julia Belle Swain

Julia Belle Swain was formerly based in Peoria, Illinois in the 1970s and 1980s, making short excursions on Peoria Lake and two-day round trip cruises to Starved Rock State Park. Singer-songwriter John Hartford was a frequent guest pilot and often mentioned Julia Belle Swain in his songs, and penned a song named for the boat that appeared on his Mark Twang album. The boat ran excursions on the Ohio River at Evansville, Indiana, during parts of 1975 and 1976. Later, the boat ran on the Tennessee River at Chattanooga, Tennessee.

Julia Belle Swain, smaller and nimbler than some of its sisters on American rivers, has entered the Great Steamboat Race twice, in 1975 and 1976. She won in 1976, beating better-known vessels such as Delta Queen and Belle of Louisville.

The Great River Steamboat Company owned the riverboat starting in 1995.

In 2009 the owners of Julia Belle Swain canceled their season because of the slow economy, and considered putting the steamboat up for sale. In 2013, the Julia Belle Swain was allowed to dock temporarily at Riverside Park in La Crosse.

The riverboat remained still, docked for five years on the backwaters of the Mississippi near the railroad bridge, until it was sold in 2013 to the newly formed, not-for-profit Julia Belle Swain Foundation which had the intentions of restoring and preserving the boat. The restoration soon turned into a rebuild which included a new boiler system, new generators, new wiring, gutting the interior, improving the insulation, and new windows, etc., however, the only original piece used is the frame. The new interior was intended to be more period correct and the steamer would have once again been "Trone Fabulous" as she was originally built. After the remodel, the foundation expected to keep this attraction in La Crosse to hold weddings and other events. The restoration of the Julia Belle Swain cost over $2.6 million.

In September 2021 the nonprofit put the boat up for sale for about $1 million. In September 2022 Julia Belle Swain was sold by the Julia Belle Swain foundation to new owner Troy Manthey, who plans to finish the restoration started by the foundation, and use the boat for Mississippi river cruises.

In December 2025 the Julia Belle Swain left La Crosse via a barge on the Mississippi River for Nashville where the boat will finish renovations and become a floating wedding venue. It was also announced the new owners renamed the boat to The Steamer Nashville.

== See also ==
- Spirit of Peoria — boat that later replaced the Julia Belle Swain at Peoria, Illinois
- La Crosse Queen — boat that also docks at Riverside Park in La Crosse, 200 yards (180 m) from Julia Belle Swain.
