= Belle of Cincinnati =

American sternwheel riverboat

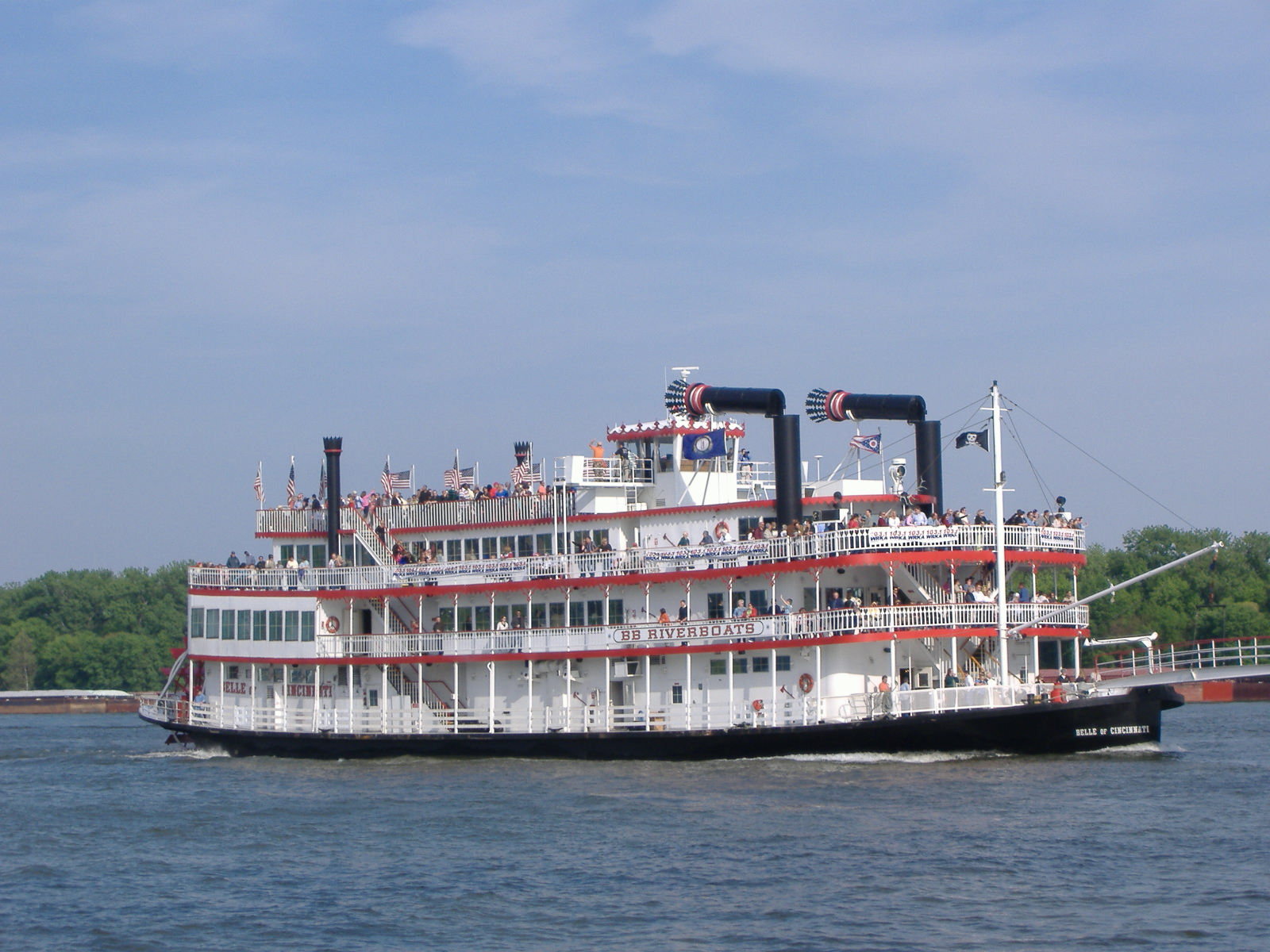
- Belle of Cincinnati crossing the riverfront of Jeffersonville, Indiana in the 2008 Great Steamboat Race

General characteristics
- Length: 225 ft (69 m)
- Beam: 50 ft (15 m)
- Decks: 4
- Propulsion: Stern paddle wheel

Belle of Cincinnati is an American sternwheel riverboat. She was built in 1991, originally named Emerald Lady and was used as a floating casino in Burlington, Iowa.

The boat is owned by BB Riverboats and operates from Newport, Kentucky on the Ohio River. Newport is across the river from Cincinnati, the namesake of the boat. She is used for excursions in the Cincinnati area and also make occasional trips to other Ohio River ports.

The Belle of Cincinnati contains four decks with a length of 225 feet (69 m) and a width of 50 feet (15 m).

Since 2009, the Belle of Cincinnati has travelled to Louisville each May to participate in the Great Steamboat Race, replacing the inactive Delta Queen in the race.
