= Tom "Cactus" Brooks =

American radio announcer (1910–1997)

- Born: William Thomas Brooks; March 4, 1910; Louisville, Kentucky, U S.
- Died: December 14, 1997 (aged 87); Louisville, Kentucky, U S.
- Occupations: Radio announcer, television host, cowboy clown

William Thomas "Cactus" Brooks, (March 3, 1910 – December 14, 1997) was a well-known television star and radio announcer in Louisville, Kentucky, for many years.

Brooks was best known as "Cactus", the cowboy clown character and sidekick to Randy Atcher on T-Bar-V Ranch and Hayloft Hoedown, two popular local shows on Louisville's WHAS-TV from 1950 until 1971.

== Early life ==
Born in Louisville, Kentucky, Brooks was the second of Edna Foster (née Megowan) and Pleasant Malone Brooks' eight children.

== Broadcast career ==
=== Broadcast radio career ===
Brooks, the brother of actor-comedian Foster Brooks, became a radio announcer to supplement the income from his regular job at Reynolds Metals Co. However, he became nervous and stammered in front of the microphone. WHAS AM radio program director Dick Fischer told him he'd never make it and should find another line of work. Hillbilly musician Roy Starkey and his Silver Sage Cowboys were broadcasting a radio show on WHAS AM and needed someone to perform using an old man's voice. Brooks volunteered, took his teeth out, did the voice, and a star was born.

WHAS AM cast Brooks in its Circle Star Ranch radio show which featured local children. When children appearing on the radio show learned that WHAS would have a television station as well, they asked if Cactus would also appear on television.

=== Broadcast television career - T-Bar-V Ranch ===
Brooks was hired to co-star with popular musician Randy Atcher. T-Bar-V Ranch went on the air March 28, 1950, the second broadcasting day of WHAS-TV. More than 153,000 children appeared on the program celebrating their birthdays during the show's broadcast run. T-Bar-V Ranch quickly became the most popular children's television program in Louisville.

Brooks would not memorize his scripts or rehearse; the show's accordionist would simply tell him the plot while he was putting on his costume. Thousands of children idolized the man with a painted face who wore overalls with large safety pins and a battered hat.

At the time T-Bar-V Ranch went off the air, it was the longest-running show with the same talent in the United States. The show featured games, a daily action adventure series and contests. Sometimes police officers or firemen would appear with safety tips; educational films were shown juxtaposed with old cartoons, all thrown in with Brooks' own special humor.

=== Other broadcast work ===
Brooks was a popular entertainer on a variety of WHAS Radio and television programs.

As "Cactus", Brooks appeared Friday nights during the WHAS AM Old Kentucky Barn Dance program on radio. A popular recurring routine was "Cactus" relating stories about his girlfriend "Esmerelda". At the time they were called "masterpieces of tall-story telling".

Brooks also starred on the daily program Ladies' Day and on Hayloft Hoedown, once rated by Pulse Survey as the top local TV show. Brooks never really lost his TV persona, even when he left the station. It was said that parents would call and get him to talk their children into eating their vegetables or brushing their teeth when their own efforts had been fruitless.

== Charitable work ==
Brooks performed at benefits and at homes for troubled teenagers and was also active in the WHAS Crusade for Children.

== Awards ==
• 1962 – Brooks received the first Kentucky Derby Festival Silver Horseshoe Award, "given to a person who had made a difference in the community and in youth development".

== Death and burial ==
Brooks died at Louisville's Meadowview Nursing and Convalescent Center after being in a nursing home for eight years. Brooks' body was interred in Louisville's Resthaven Cemetery.
