= Six Mile Island State Nature Preserve =

Nature preserve in Kentucky, US

Six Mile Island
- IUCN category V (protected landscape/seascape)
- Location within Kentucky
- Location: Louisville, Kentucky
- Nearest city: Jeffersonville, Indiana
- Coordinates: 38°18′37″N 85°39′58″W
- Area: 81 acres (330,000 m^{2})
- Established: June 24, 1979
- Governing body: Kentucky State National Preserves Commission

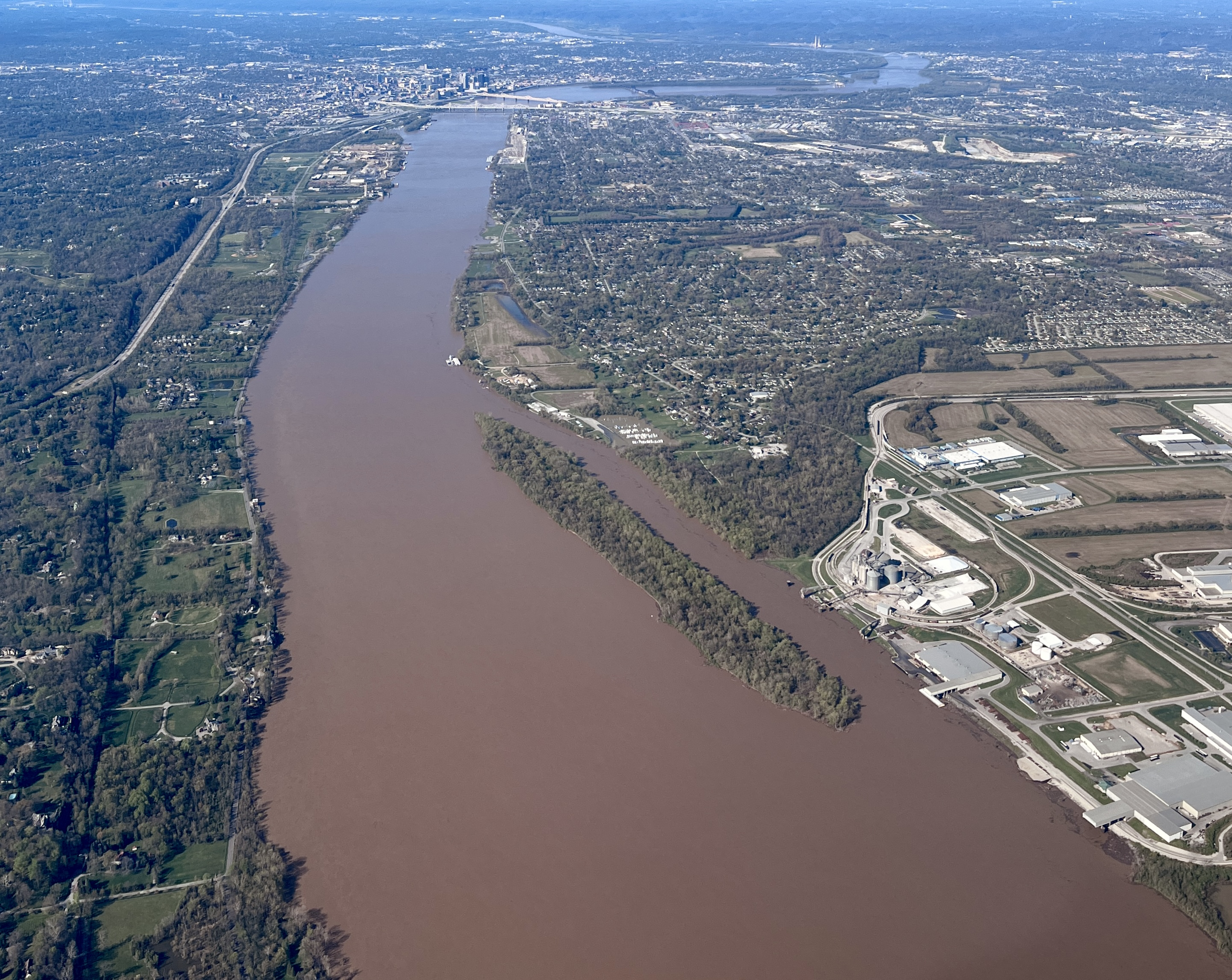
Six Mile Island on the Ohio River, looking west toward downtown Louisville, April 7, 2024.

Six Mile Island is a Kentucky state nature preserve located on the Ohio River upstream of Louisville, Kentucky.

== About ==
The Office of Kentucky Nature Preserves owns and manages the preserve, which was dedicated June 24, 1979. The reserve is an undeveloped riverine island and is known for its extensive variety of waterbirds. Six Mile Island is only accessible by boat, but it is open to the public.

The island was named for its distance from the Falls of the Ohio, much like Fourteen Mile Creek and Twelve Mile Island also located along the Ohio river.

The Great Steamboat Race during the Kentucky Derby Festival turns around at Six Mile Island as the halfway marker during the race.
