= Hillbilly Outfield: Kentucky Derby party =

The Hillbilly Outfield: Kentucky Derby party is hosted annually by a group of volunteers called the Hillbilly Coalition, to benefit the Make A Wish Foundation. The Hillbilly Outfield Kentucky Derby party began in 2001, and is one of the biggest Kentucky Derby parties in Louisville. Because of its location in Middletown, Kentucky, being a part of the Louisville metropolitan area and far from the actual Derby, it was named the "Outfield". This is jokingly a reference to the famous Infield at the Kentucky Derby. The event consists of an entire weekend of drinks, food, live music, audio and video Derby coverage, games, and more. Most importantly, however, the driving motivation behind the event is that it is a non-profit event with no paid personnel solely to raise funds for the Make-A-Wish Foundation. The Hillbilly Outfield is becoming a Kentucky Derby tradition for many, and will become more and more of a tradition with every new Derby season. Between 400 and 500 people are in attendance each year. Ticket prices range between $50-$70, and cover food, drinking (non-alcoholic), camping space and entertainment. The Hillbilly Outfield supplies beers for only $1 each, including brands like Coors and Samuel Adams. The Hillbilly Outfield has been featured countless times as a must-attend event by many sources including various news channels, horse magazines, ESPN and Sports Illustrated.

== The Coalition ==
- Beau Schuster - President
- Jim Hafendorfer - Treasurer/Host
- Greg Gish - Secretary/Artist
- Jennifer Hafendorfer - Public Relations
- Mark Yenowine - Zoning Commissioner
- Dave McCarthy- The Horse Whisperer
- Debbie Raydon - "Wildlife/Gaming"
- Valerie Bronson - Vending
- Michael Wilson - Chief Bartender
- Christina Jones and Olivia Wilson- Silent Auction

== Artwork ==
The artwork for the event is of a unique taste, and has a great deal of influence on the uniqueness of this Kentucky Derby party and its theme. There are multiple distinctive characters that appear every year in the artwork, with additional characters being incorporated annually. From year to year, they develop different traits. Every year, it is based thematically on some related Derby event.

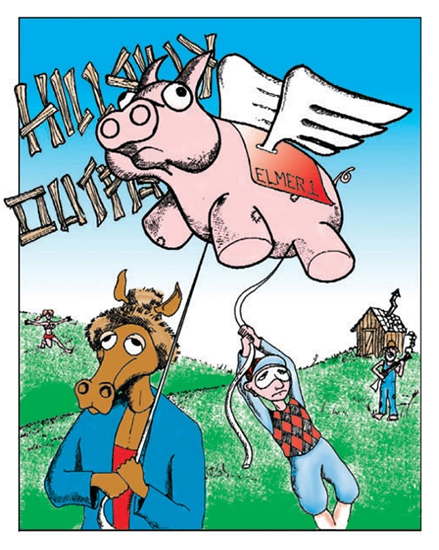
Art from 2005

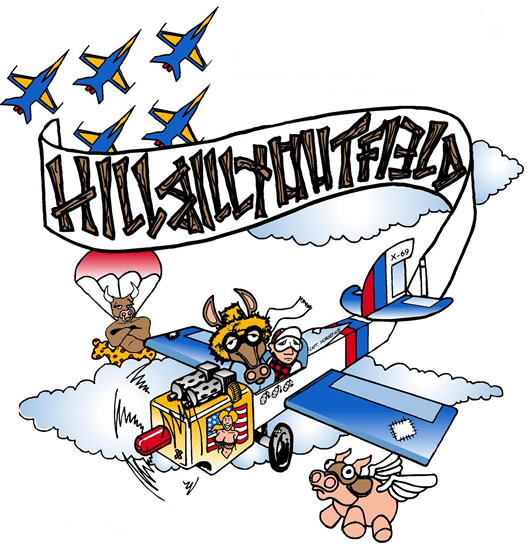
Art from 2006

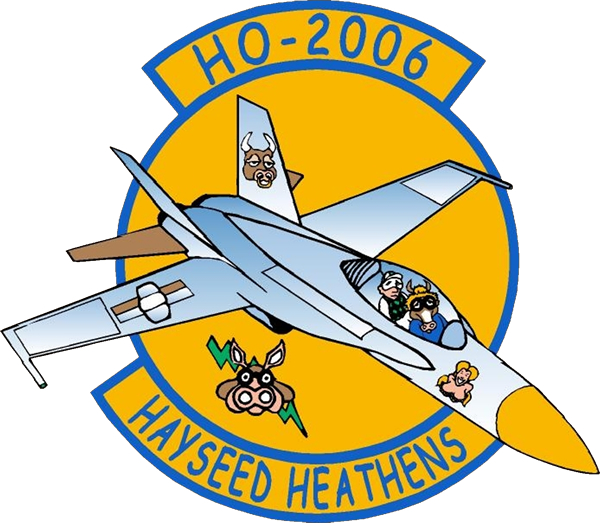
More Art from 2006

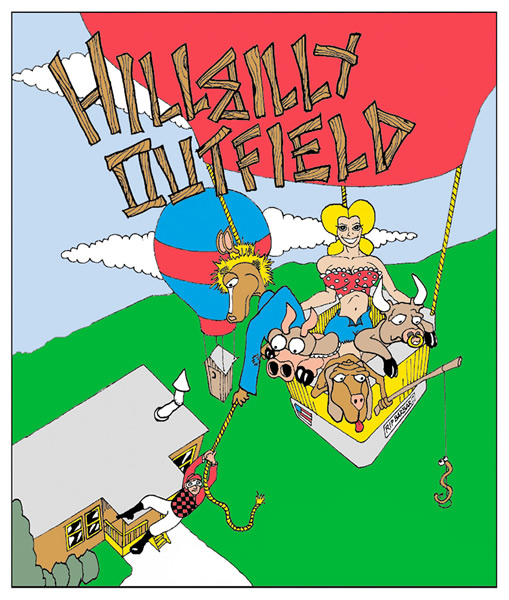
Art from 2007

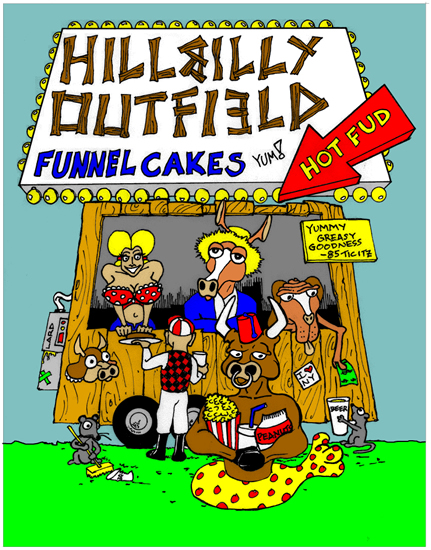
Art from 2008

== Photos ==
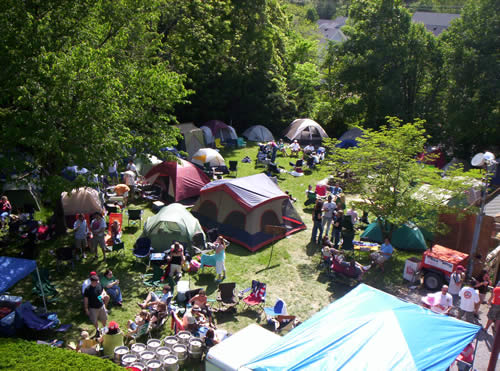
Camping Area

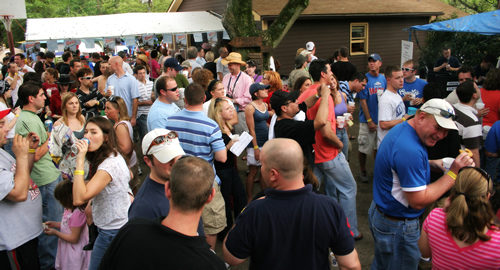
Some Guests

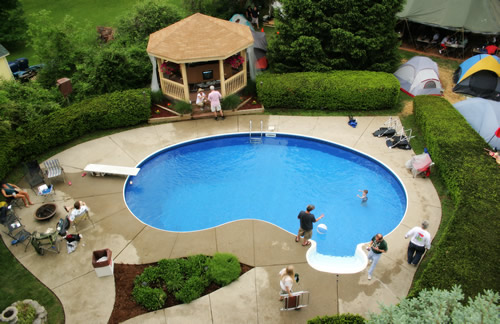
Pool Area

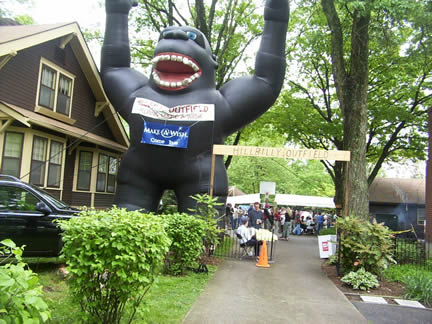
The '04 Greetor

== See also ==
- Kentucky Derby Festival
- List of attractions and events in the Louisville metropolitan area
