= La Crosse Queen =

Coordinates: 43°49′5.06″N 91°15′24.57″W

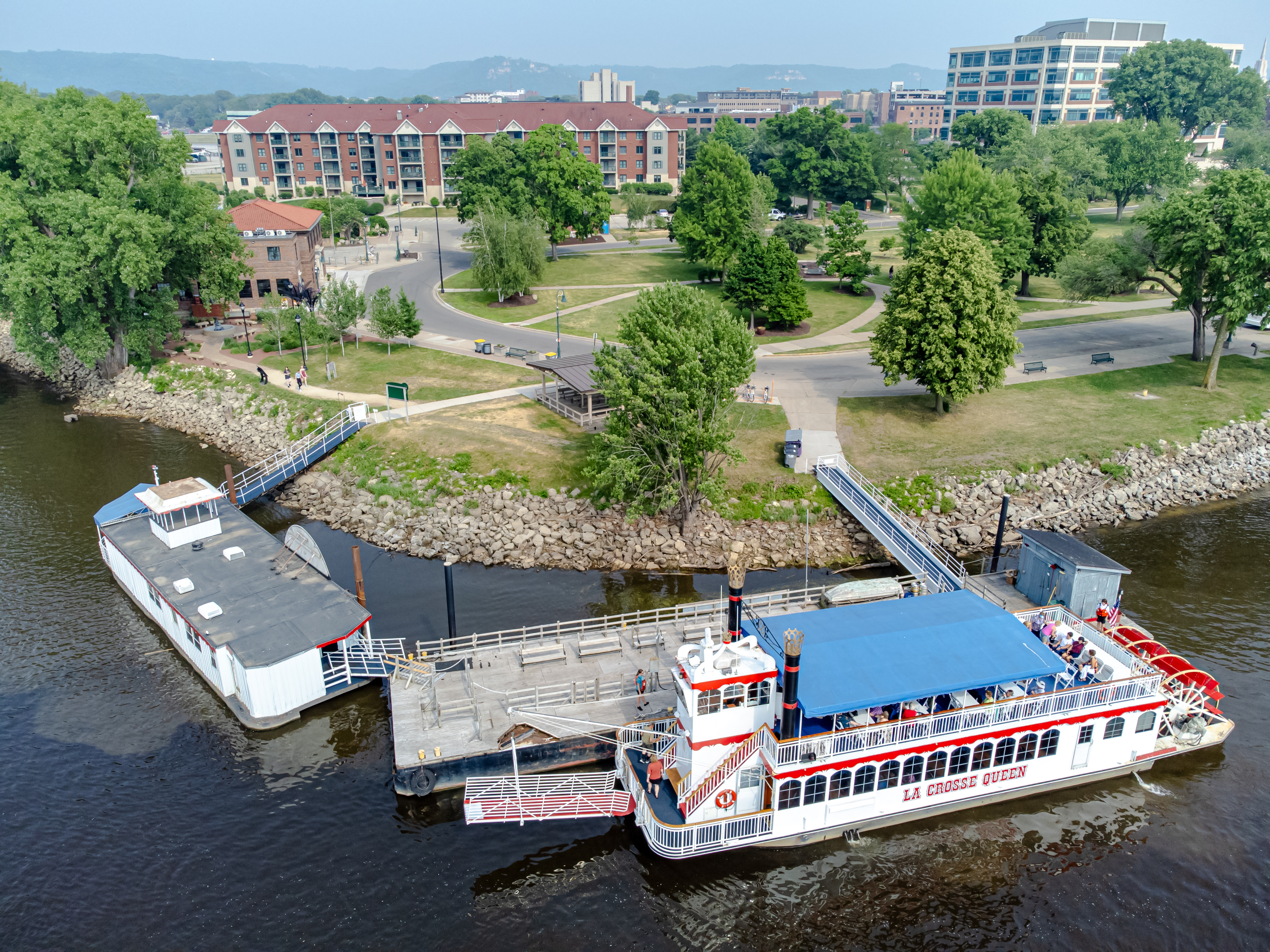
La Crosse Queen

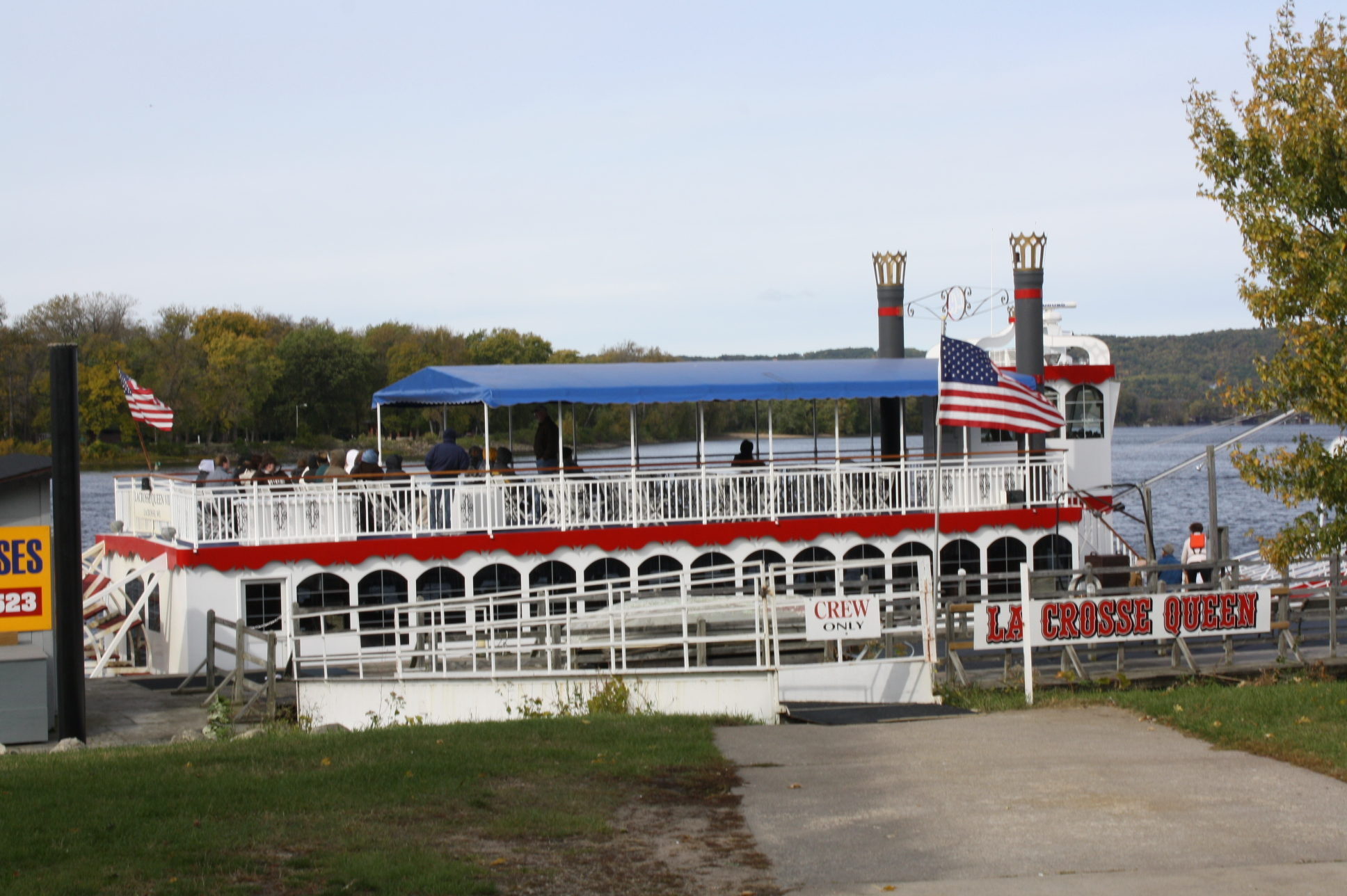
La Crosse Queen at her docks in 2009

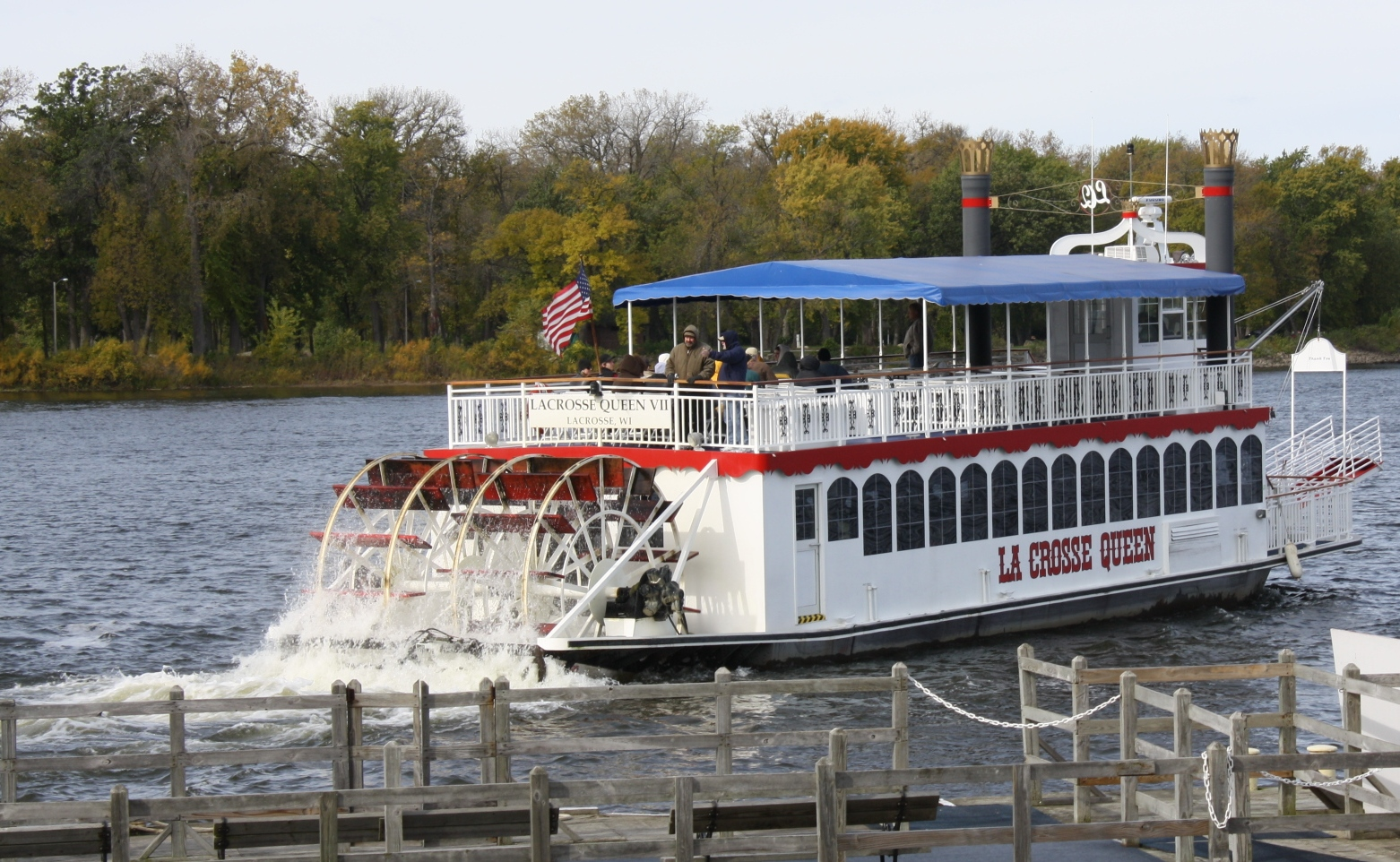
La Crosse Queen right after leaving her dock

The La Crosse Queen is the name of seven different sightseeing and excursion boats that have operated out of La Crosse, Wisconsin's Riverside Park. The current vessel, La Crosse Queen VII was built in 2008 at Skipperliner Marine on French Island, Wisconsin. The La Crosse Queen VII offers both public and private cruises from its port in Riverside Park. The vessel is U.S. Coast Guard inspected for safety and is licensed to carry up to 149 passengers.

== True Mississippi river paddlewheeler ==
The La Crosse Queen is a modern-day replica of the grand river boats that plied the Mississippi River in the late 19th century. She is one of the few authentic Mississippi River paddlewheel river boats still in operation in the country today. In keeping with early traditions, she was built with split sternwheels that are her only means of propulsion. The La Crosse Queen has a split sternwheel and each is run by a twin diesel engine that powers hydraulic motors which turn the paddles. This is in contrast to most Mississippi River paddlewheelers in operation today that have a "free wheeling" paddlewheel at the stern of the boat for visual effect, but have traditional screw-type engines hidden for their real means of propulsion. The boat is divided into two levels, the upper deck and the lower deck. The upper deck is covered by a canopy and is open at the sides so that guest can enjoy the scenic view and feel of the breeze. The lower deck consists of a galley, dining room, bar area and heads. There is also a large picture window at the stern of the boat on the lower deck where guests can watch the authentic paddlewheels in action. The La Crosse docks alongside a barge designed to look like and old sidewheel style showboat. This serves an office and gift shop.

Sometime in the night of April 14–15, 2010, the La Crosse Queen's office sank into the Mississippi river leaving most of the barge underwater. The office sank due to both high water, and flood debris. As the water started to decline, debris from flooding, presumably trees, propped one end of the barge up causing the other side to go below the water line and take on water until it eventually sank. The barge was temporarily replaced with a yacht for summer 2010 where the staff was able to continue office functions, however there was no gift shop during this time.

The La Crosse Queen offers a variety of cruises available to the public including Daily Sightseeing Cruises, Sunday Brunch Cruises, Friday, Saturday, and Sunday Night Dinner Cruises, Three Hour Meal Cruises, Cocktail Cruises, and Moonlight Cruises. The boat also offers private charters for special occasions, conventions, class reunions, receptions, weddings, business parties, and family get-togethers.

== Grand Excursion ==
The La Crosse Queen participated in the 2004 Grand Excursion. While in La Crosse, the true paddlewheeler La Crosse Queen raced the double propeller powered Harriett Bishop from the confluence of the Black and La Crosse Rivers to the Mississippi River Bridge and back. The La Crosse Queen was handily defeated.

== See also ==
- Julia Belle Swain — Docks At Port of La Crosse in Riverside Park, roughly 100 yards from where the La Crosse Queen Docks.
