= Great Steamboat Race =

Annual steamboat race on the Ohio River

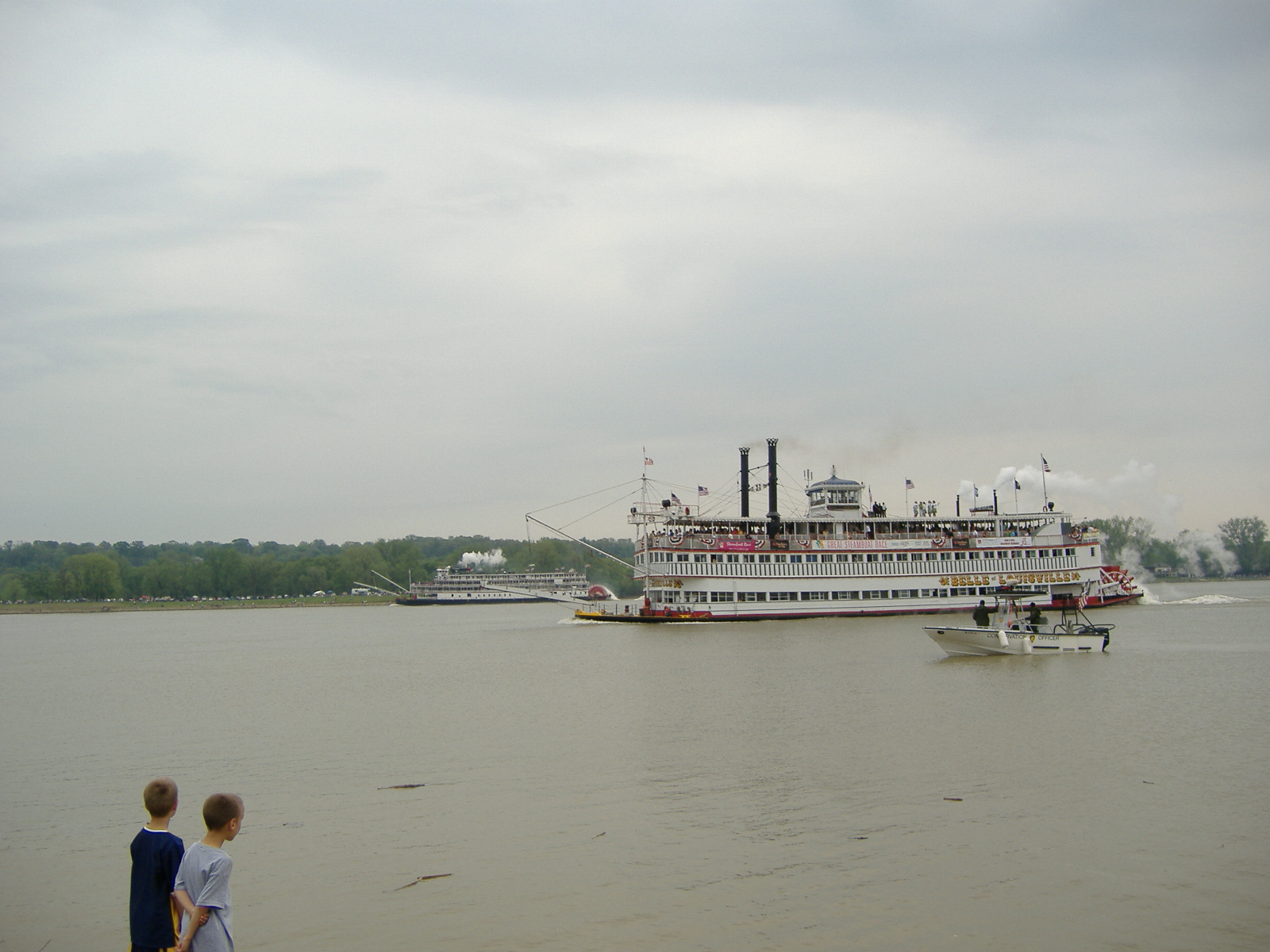
- The 2007 Race, as seen from Duffy's Landing in Jeffersonville, Indiana
- Date: Late April or early May
- Frequency: Annual
- Founded: 1963; 63 years ago
- Website: Race webpage

The Great Steamboat Race is an annual steamboat race, taking place the Wednesday before the first Saturday of May, three days before the Kentucky Derby, as part of the Kentucky Derby Festival. The race was first run in 1963 and it takes place on the Ohio River in the span that runs between Louisville, Kentucky and Jeffersonville, Indiana. Until 2009, the race was traditionally between the Belle of Louisville and the Delta Queen, although other steamboats have participated. Since 2009, the Delta Queen has not participated due to ownership and legal issues, and the Belle of Cincinnati has taken its place in the competition. In 2012, the Belle of Louisville and Belle of Cincinnati were joined in the race by the American Queen.

== Format ==
The race is scheduled annually as part of the Kentucky Derby Festival. The event pits at least two riverboats against each other in the span of the Ohio River that runs between Louisville, Kentucky and Jeffersonville, Indiana. Spectators can watch the event from the shore or aboard a competing vessel.

=== Traditional ===
The race began underneath the George Rogers Clark Memorial Bridge, which served as the start/finish line. Both steamboats raced to Six Mile Island, where they turned around to return to the bridge. The distance is 14 miles, with boats averaging a speed of 7 miles per hour (11 km/h). The competitors were traditionally the Belle of Louisville and the Delta Queen, although other additional or substitutionary vessels occasionally competed. The annual winner received the Golden Antlers, which would remain with the winner until the next race.

=== Modern ===
2008 was the last year to feature the Delta Queen as a competitor prior to it being renovated into a dry-dock hotel; the Belle of Cincinnati has subsequently entered the races in the Queen's stead. In 2009, the event organizers changed the format prompting the Belle of Cincinnati's Capt. Kerry Snowden to note that "[t]here are no rules in riverboat racing, so whatever goes, goes". The new format features a series of tasks that the crews must perform for points prior to the race. Because the Cincinnati is a diesel ship with more power, it is required to travel further to Harrods Creek. The boat with the most points after the race is determined to be the winner and is presented with the Silver Antlers, which take the place of the Golden Antlers that were retired when the Queen stopped competing.

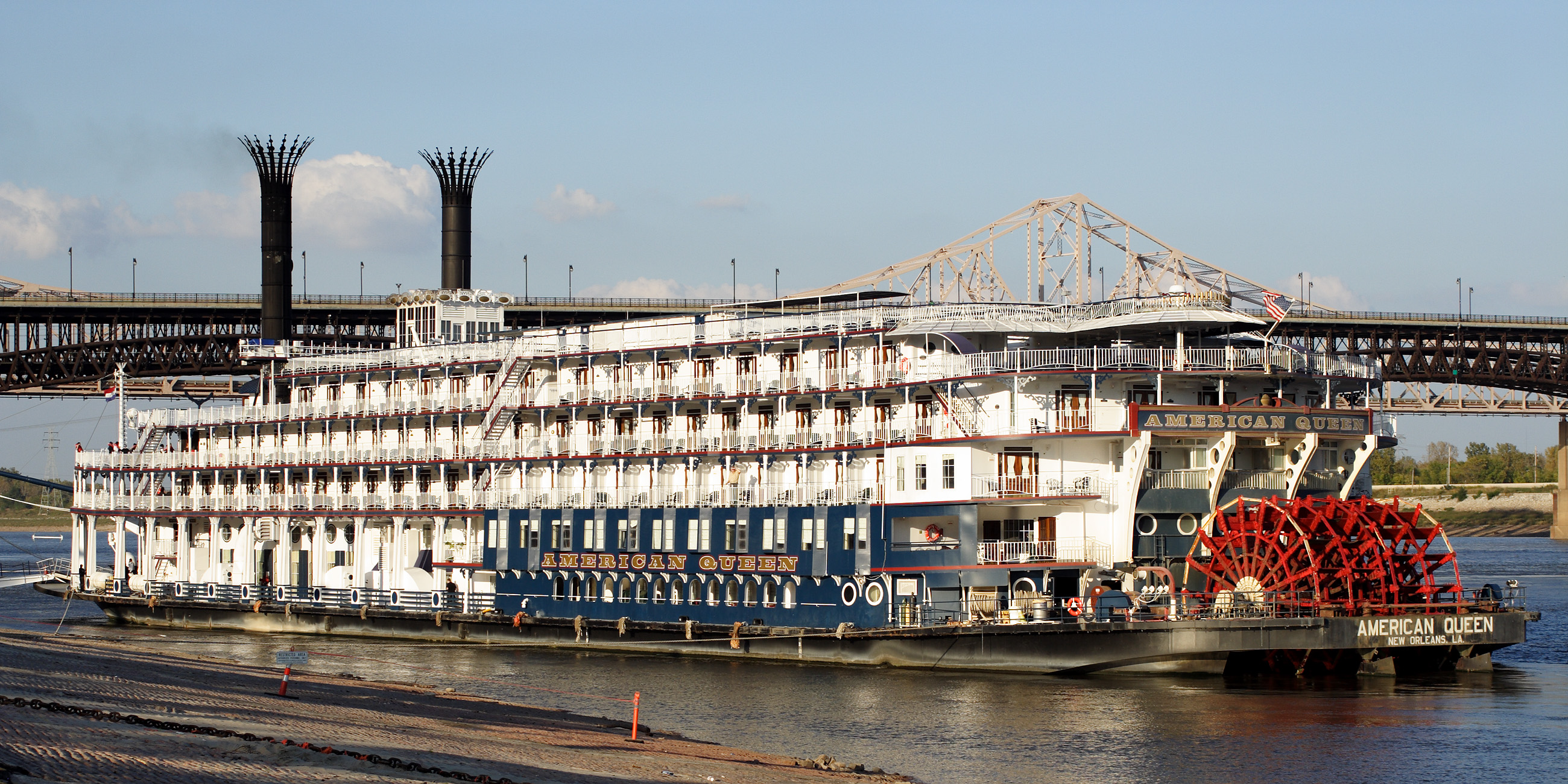
The American Queen was one of only five major riverboats in the United States that are powered by steam.

The 2012 race featured, for the first time since 2008, once again two steam-powered boats as competitors, as well as the diesel-powered Belle of Cincinnati. The American Queen, returned to overnight steamboat service in April 2012, competed in the three-way race on May 2, 2012, and finished as second.

== History ==
The first Great Steamboat Race was held in 1963 between the Belle of Louisville and the Delta Queen, establishing the traditional rivalry until 2008 when the Queen was retired. The Queen won the first race. As of the Delta Queen's last race in 2008, the Louisville won 22 races compared to the Queen's 20 wins. The Louisville's winning record compared to the Queen's larger size and more powerful engines has helped fuel the unproven speculation that the race is predetermined.

=== Other competitors ===
Several other riverboats have participated in the race:

- Julia Belle Swain competed in 1975 and 1976, the latter of which it won.
- Natchez IX of the New Orleans Steamboat Company in 1982, which it won.
- Spirit of Jefferson raced in 1999 in the Louisville's stead while the Louisville was recovering from sabotage. It is diesel-powered and has been used as an observation boat for the race.
- Belle of Cincinnati was a contestant in 2002, and followed as an observation boat in latter years. Since 2009, it has replaced the Delta Queen as the annual competitor. It is diesel-powered and has also been used as an observation boat for the race.
- American Queen competed for the first time in 2012, in a 3-way race with the Louisville and Cincinnati, finishing 2nd.
- American Duchess competed for the first time in 2018, in a 3-way race with the Cincinnati and Louisville, finishing 1st.

Popular viewing areas for the race are the old Water Tower in Louisville, and along Utica Pike in Jeffersonville, especially near Duffy's Landing.

== Results ==
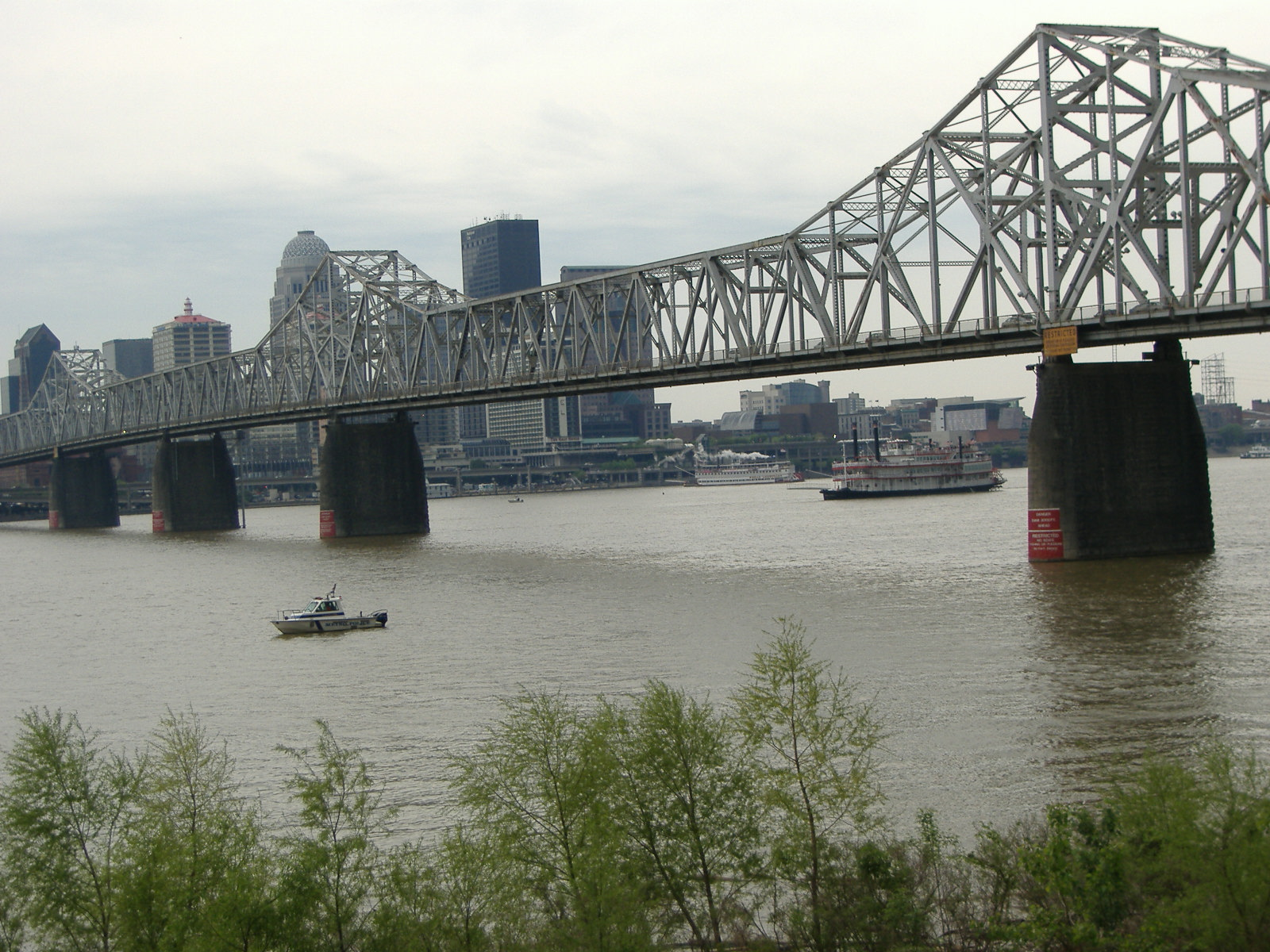
Competitors start to arrive at the start point of the 2007 Race

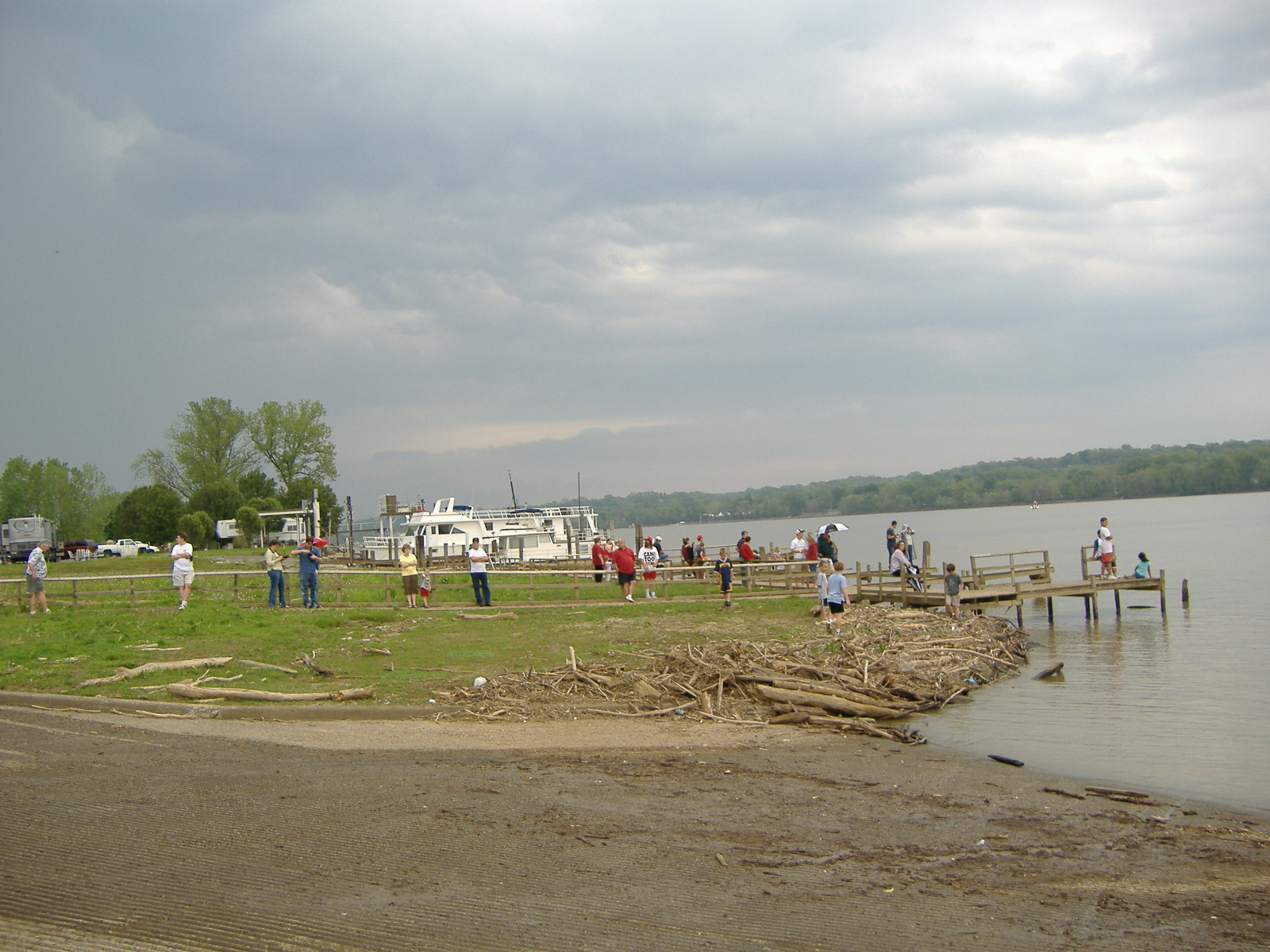
Spectators of the 2007 Race at Duffy's Landing in Jeffersonville, Indiana

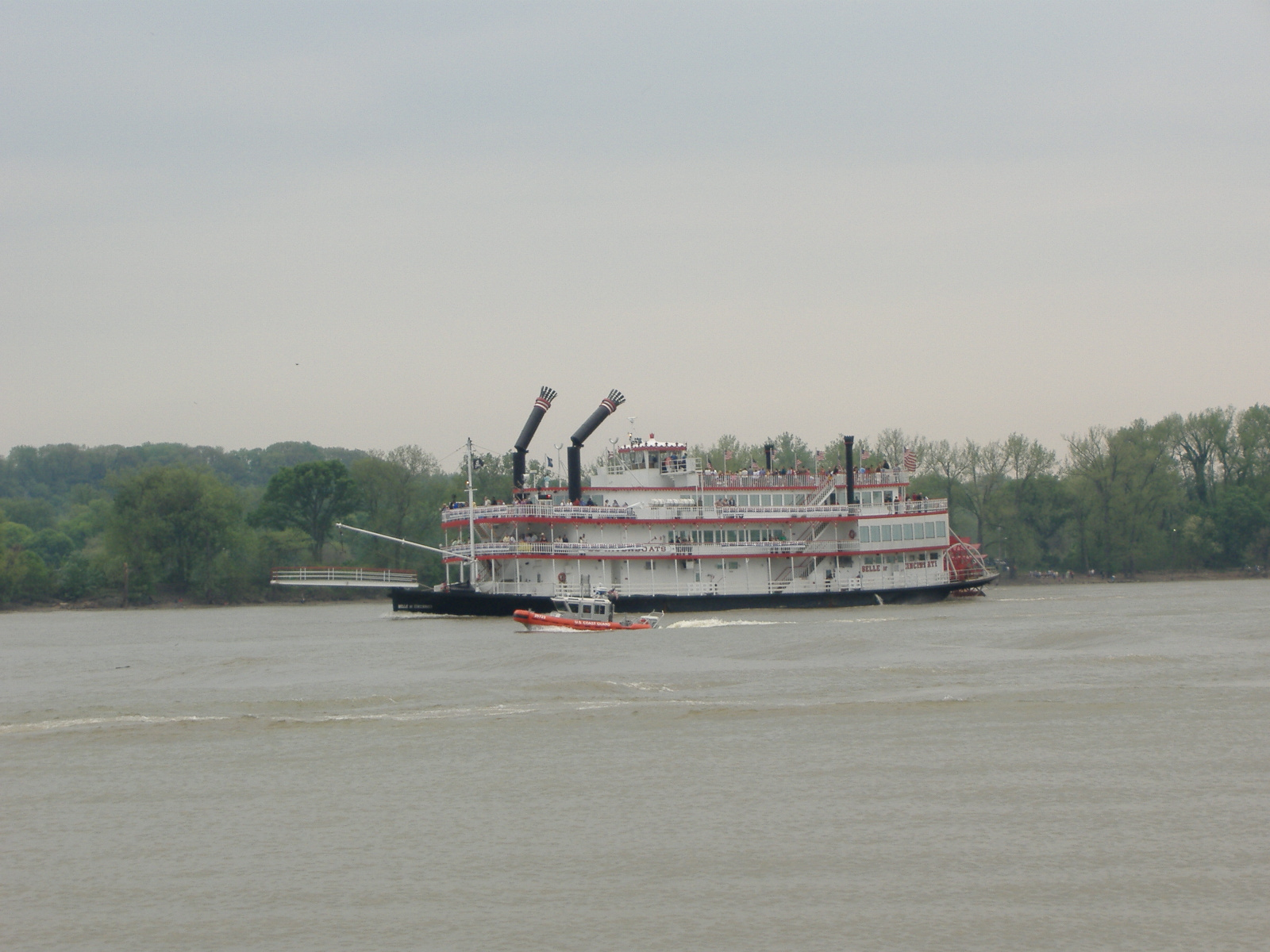
The Belle of Cincinnati follows the competitors in 2007

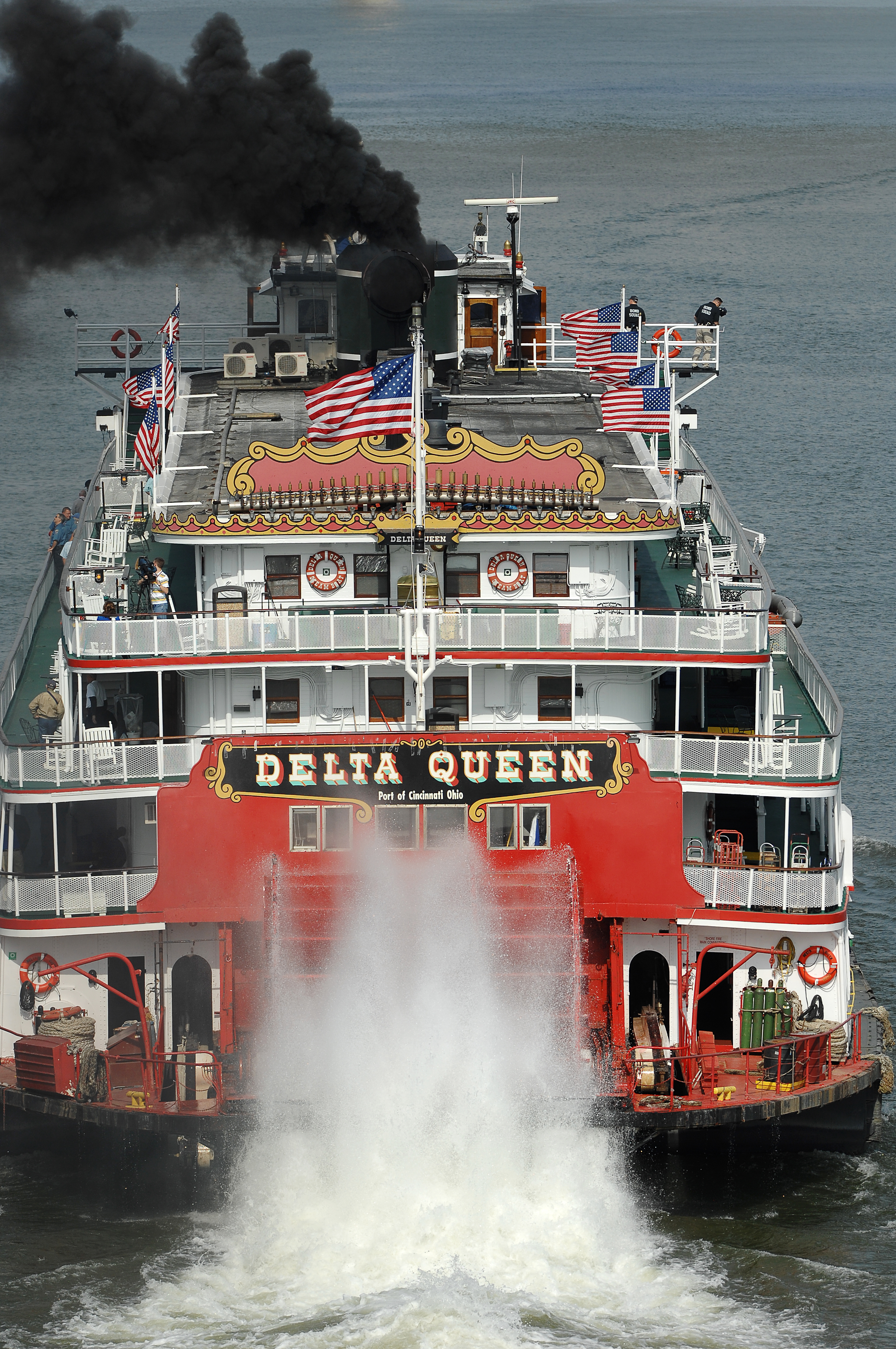
The Delta Queen at the start of the 2008 race

Year	Winner	Notes
1963	Delta Queen	
1964	Belle of Louisville	
1965	Delta Queen	
1966	Delta Queen	
1967	N/A	High water led to race cancellation.
1968	Delta Queen	
1969	Belle of Louisville	
1970	Belle of Louisville	
1971	Belle of Louisville	
1972	Belle of Louisville	
1973	Delta Queen	
1974	Delta Queen	
1975	Belle of Louisville	
1976	Julia Belle Swain	
1977	Delta Queen	
1978	Delta Queen	
1979	Belle of Louisville	
1980	Belle of Louisville	
1981	Belle of Louisville	
1982	Natchez-New Orleans	Three-boat race
1983	Belle of Louisville	
1984	Delta Queen	Belle of Louisville received a bomb threat and had to pull into Cox's Park, evacuating 613 passengers.
1985	Delta Queen	
1986	Delta Queen	
1987	Belle of Louisville	
1988	Belle of Louisville	
1989	Delta Queen	
1990	Delta Queen	
1991	Belle of Louisville	
1992	Delta Queen	
1993	Belle of Louisville	
1994	Delta Queen	
1995	Belle of Louisville	
1996	Belle of Louisville	Race shortened due to high water levels on the Ohio.
1997	Delta Queen	
1998	Belle of Louisville	
1999	Spirit of Jefferson	
2000	Belle of Louisville	
2001	Delta Queen	
2002	Belle of Louisville	Belle of Cincinnati "initially won", but was disqualified when "it was found out" that it was diesel powered, and thus not a steamboat.
2003	Delta Queen	three boat race
2004	Belle of Louisville	
2005	Belle of Louisville	Delta Queen was unable to come to Louisville due to high water levels on the Ohio.
2006	Delta Queen	
2007	Belle of Louisville	The Delta Queen arrived at the finish line ahead of the Belle by 1.5 boatlengths, but because the Queen turned before it got to its turnaround buoy, the Belle was given the victory.
2008	Delta Queen	The Belle of Louisville arrived at the finish line ahead of the Delta Queen, but because the Belle turned before it got to its turnaround buoy, the Queen was given the victory. 3 Boat Race.
2009	Belle of Louisville	Belle of Cincinnati replaced Delta Queen, which has been retired.
2010	Belle of Cincinnati	Score: 60 – 99
2011	Belle of Louisville	High waters on the Ohio River forced the race to be postponed to June 29, 2011. The Belle of Cincinnati was renamed The Belle of Kentucky, and, accordingly, she flew a Kentucky Wildcats banner covering "Belle of Cincinnati", adding a UofL/UK rivalry flavor to the race (seeing as the owners of The Belle of Cincinnati are UK fans) as a means to increase interest in the event being held outside the traditional time of year, The Kentucky Derby Festival.
2012	Belle of Louisville	Three boat race including the American Queen
2013	Belle of Cincinnati	
2014	Belle of Louisville	
2015	Belle of Louisville	
2016	Belle of Cincinnati	
2017	Belle of Cincinnati	
2018	American Duchess	Three-way race including the American Duchess
2019	Belle of Louisville	
2021	Belle of Louisville	Three way race including the American Duchess
2022	Belle of Louisville	Three-way race including the Belle of Cincinnati and newcomer American Countess
2023	Belle of Louisville	Three-way race including the Belle of Cincinnati and American Countess
2024	Belle of Cincinnati	
2025	Mary M. Miller	
2026	Belle of Louisville	Belle of Cincinnati crossed the finish line first, but judges declared the Belle of Louisville the winner because it traveled further upriver.

== See also ==
- List of attractions and events in the Louisville metropolitan area
- Thunder Over Louisville
