= Par-A-Dice Hotel and Casino =

Casino in East Peoria, Illinois, United States

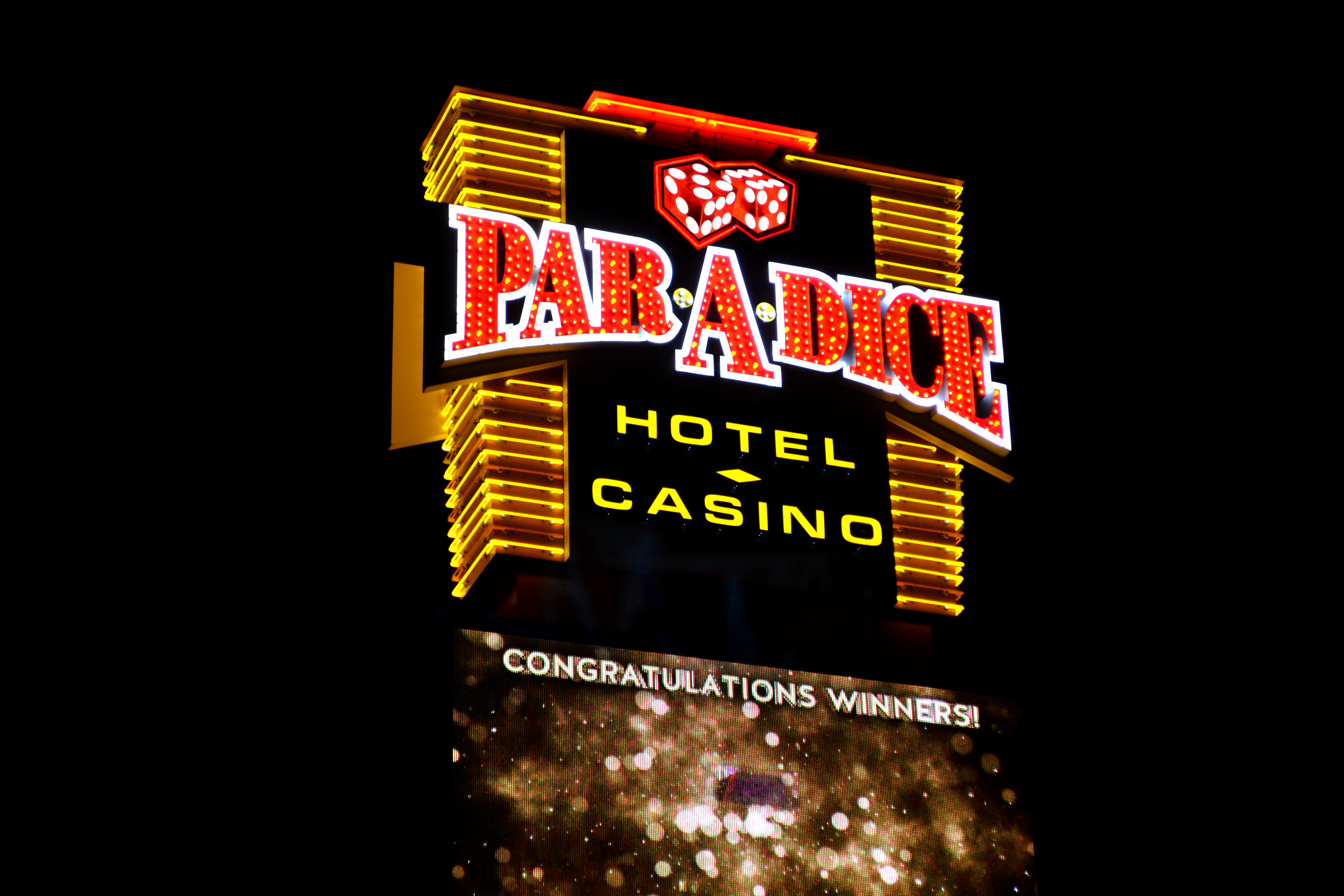
- Interactive map of Par-A-Dice Hotel and Casino
- Location: East Peoria, Illinois, United States; 21 Blackjack Blvd, East Peoria, Illinois 61611; 40°40′48.5″N 89°33′54″W
- Opened: 1991
- No. of rooms: 202
- Notable restaurants: William B's Steakhouse
- Casino type: Riverboat casino (docked)
- Owner: Boyd Gaming
- Public transit access: CityLink
- Website: www.paradicecasino.com

Par-A-Dice Hotel and Casino is a casino located on the Illinois River off Illinois Route 116/U.S. Route 150 in East Peoria, Illinois, United States.

== History ==
=== Planning and Development ===
According to the Illinois Gaming Board, The Riverboat Gambling Act was enacted in February 1990. Illinois was the second state to legalize riverboat gambling.

Both Peoria and East Peoria launched campaigns to host a riverboat casino, but there was also controversy in the community about legalized gambling in the area. The East Peoria Riverboat Corporation was formed, with Dale Burklund as president. Burkland owned the property where the Par-A-Dice Hotel Casino currently sits. The corporation applied for one of five licenses. Jim Jumer, owner of Jumer's Castle Lodge in Peoria, also applied for a license.

The Greater Peoria Riverboat Corporation invested $34 million into the Par-A-Dice.

The Par-A-Dice was named after an old tavern called "The Paradise" in East Peoria.

=== Opening ===
The Par-A-Dice opened on November 20, 1991, in Peoria, Illinois, and moved across the river to East Peoria on May 18, 1993.

According to the Alton Telegraph, in its third week of operation, the Par-A-Dice made $660,093 from 17,160 passengers, a higher amount of passengers than the Alton Belle Casino.

The original boat was a paddle wheeler; the corporation leased the Spirit of Peoria while its East Peoria facilities were being readied for operations. The current vessel was placed in June 1994.

Originally established with local investors, it was later sold to Boyd Gaming on April 29, 1996, for $163 million in cash.

The Par-A-Dice had cruised the Illinois River 10 times daily during its early years, but stopped cruising altogether after Illinois dropped the requirement for riverboat casinos to leave their docks in June 1999. However, as the result of a new U.S. Coast Guard annual requirement, the riverboat set off for a few hours in the morning in June 2010 for the first time in 11 years.

Storefront gaming was legalized in 2012, which has threatened the casino's business model.

== Operations ==
=== Casino ===
The Par-A-Dice has over 26,000 square feet of gambling space. The casino has over 1,000 slot machines and video poker machines. The Par-A-Dice has 21 table games including blackjack, craps, baccarat, roulette, and Texas hold-em poker. The casino also partners with FanDuel Sportsbook since 2020 for sports betting. In 2022, the casino partnered with BetMGM to enter the market in Illinois.

=== Dining ===
Boyd's Steakhouse was operational until 2023. William B's Steakhouse opened in February 2023.

=== Hotel ===
The Par-A-Dice Hotel has 220 rooms.
