= Celebration Belle =

Riverboat on the Mississippi River

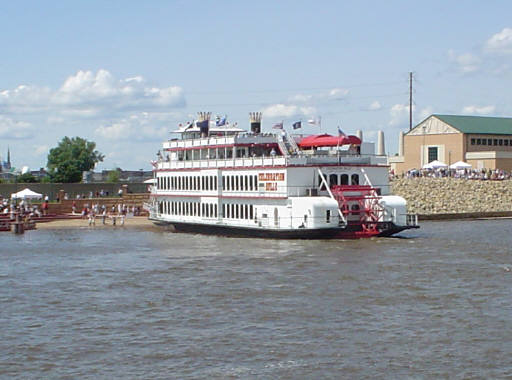
The Celebration Belle at Dubuque, Iowa during the 2004 Grand Excursion

The Celebration Belle is a riverboat on the Mississippi River. Called "Jewel of Quad Cities Riverfront," this boat normally serves the Quad Cities region as a passenger excursion boat. Originally, the boat was named the Mississippi Belle and was based in Dubuque, Iowa.

In 2004 the Celebration Belle participated in the Grand Excursion.

In 2023 Illinois-born actor Jane Lynch appeared in a major 22-market coverage for Celebration Belle, produced by the State of Illinois.
