= Kentucky Derby Festival =

Celebration held prior to the Kentucky Derby

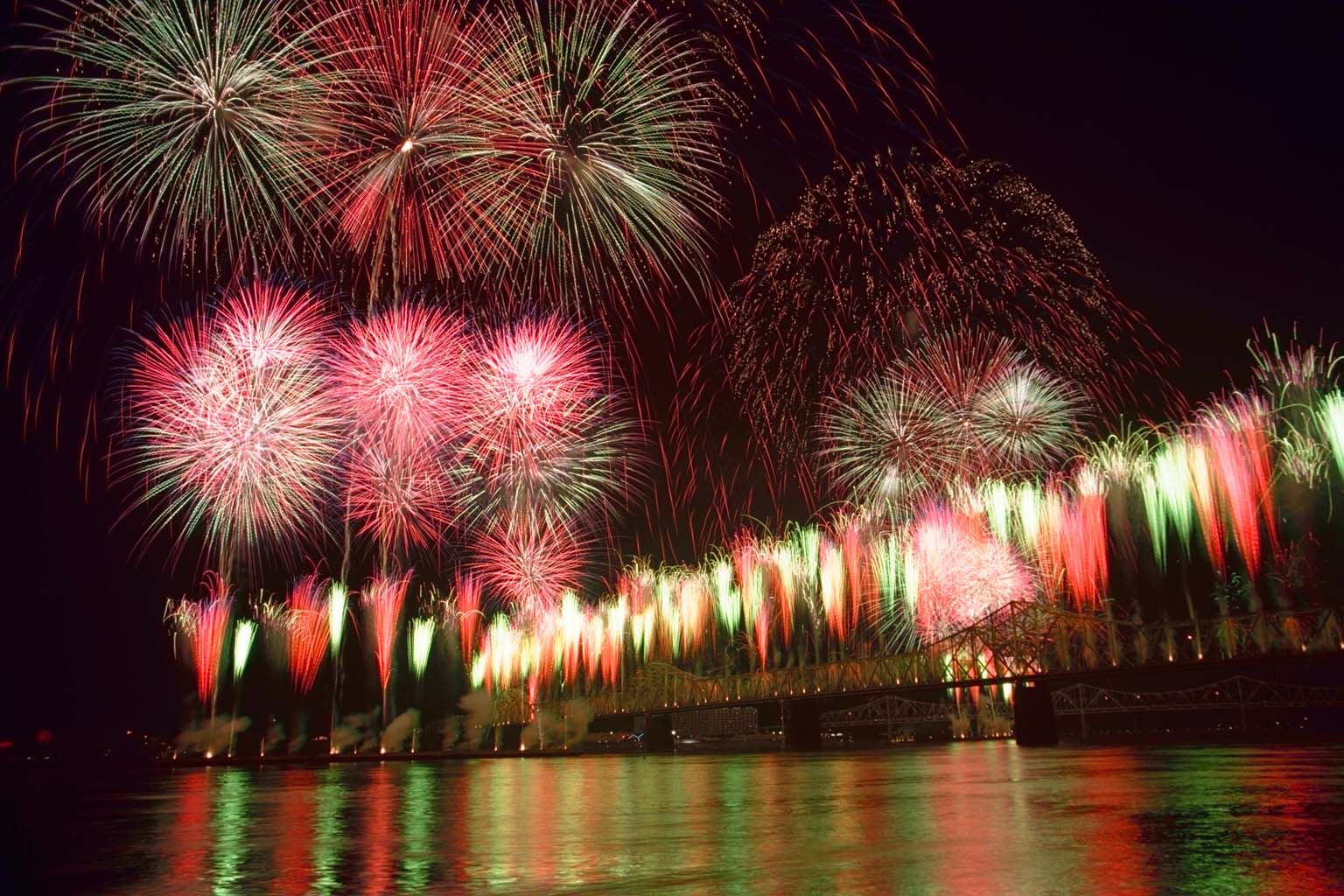
- Thunder Over Louisville
- Genre: Horse racing
- Dates: The two weeks prior to the Kentucky Derby
- Locations: Louisville, Kentucky, US
- Years active: 1935–1937, 1956–2019, 2021–present
- Website: kdf.org

The Kentucky Derby Festival is an annual festival held in Louisville, Kentucky, during the two weeks preceding the first Saturday in May, the day of the Kentucky Derby. The festival, Kentucky's largest single annual event, was first held from 1935 to 1937 and was revived in 1956.

Major events include: the Derby Festival miniMarathon and Marathon; Thunder Over Louisville, the largest annual fireworks display in North America; the Great Steamboat Race, featuring the Belle of Louisville; and the Pegasus Parade.

== History ==
The Kentucky Derby Festival Association started the first weeklong festival in 1935, including a parade, a riverfront regatta, and an orchestral concert. The first director was Olympic gold medalist Arnold Jackson. In 1937, a Derby Festival king and queen were crowned, marking the start of this tradition. After the floods of 1937, the festival was discontinued and it was not reestablished until 1956. In 2020, the festival was cancelled due to COVID-19, the first such cancellation since 1938.

In 1962, Tom "Cactus" Brooks received the first Kentucky Derby Festival Silver Horseshoe Award, "given to a person who had made a difference in the community and in youth development".

== Official events ==
=== The Royal Court ===
The Royal Court is among the oldest traditions of the Kentucky Derby Festival tradition, dating back to the 1950s by The Fillies, Inc. The Royal Court consists of a group of five young women chosen to preside over events related to the Kentucky Derby. These women officially represent both the Derby Festival and the city of Louisville. In January, a court of Derby Princesses is selected from a pool of more than 1000 applicants. Thirty finalists are selected and the pool is then reduced to five young women who make up the court. Criteria for the selection of the court members includes knowledge of the Derby Festival, poise, intelligence, personality, academic excellence and campus/community involvement.

The court attends nearly 70 events during the two-week period leading up to the Kentucky Derby. The queen is selected by a spin of the wheel at the Annual Fillies Derby Ball. The festival saw this method of queen selections as the most fair way to select from their court and the tradition continues today. Each member of the court is awarded a $2000 scholarship, an entire wardrobe for the festival, VIP access to all events and a chauffeur for the entire two weeks of the official Kentucky Derby Festival.

=== Thunder Over Louisville ===
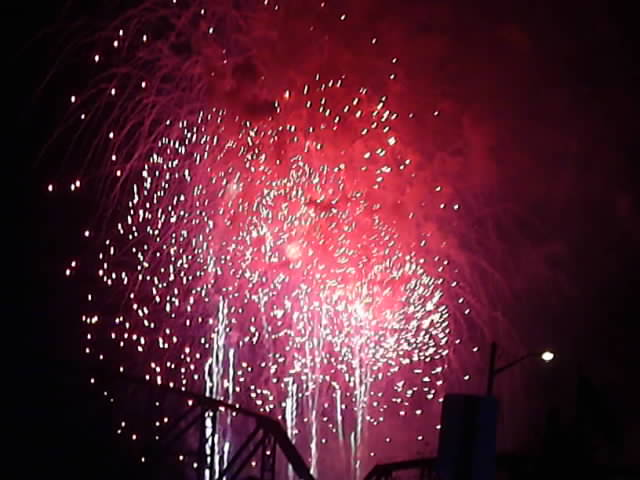
Fireworks at Thunder Over Louisville

The festival's first major event is Thunder Over Louisville. Thunder kicks off with a day-long air show and one of the largest fireworks displays in North America.

=== Fest-A-Ville ===
During the festival, much of Waterfront Park is billed as "Fest-A-Ville". It hosts a number of events, including the Chow Wagon, rides, and concerts.

=== Poster ===
Each year, an official Derby Festival poster is unveiled and prints are sold to help finance festival events.

=== Pegasus Parade ===
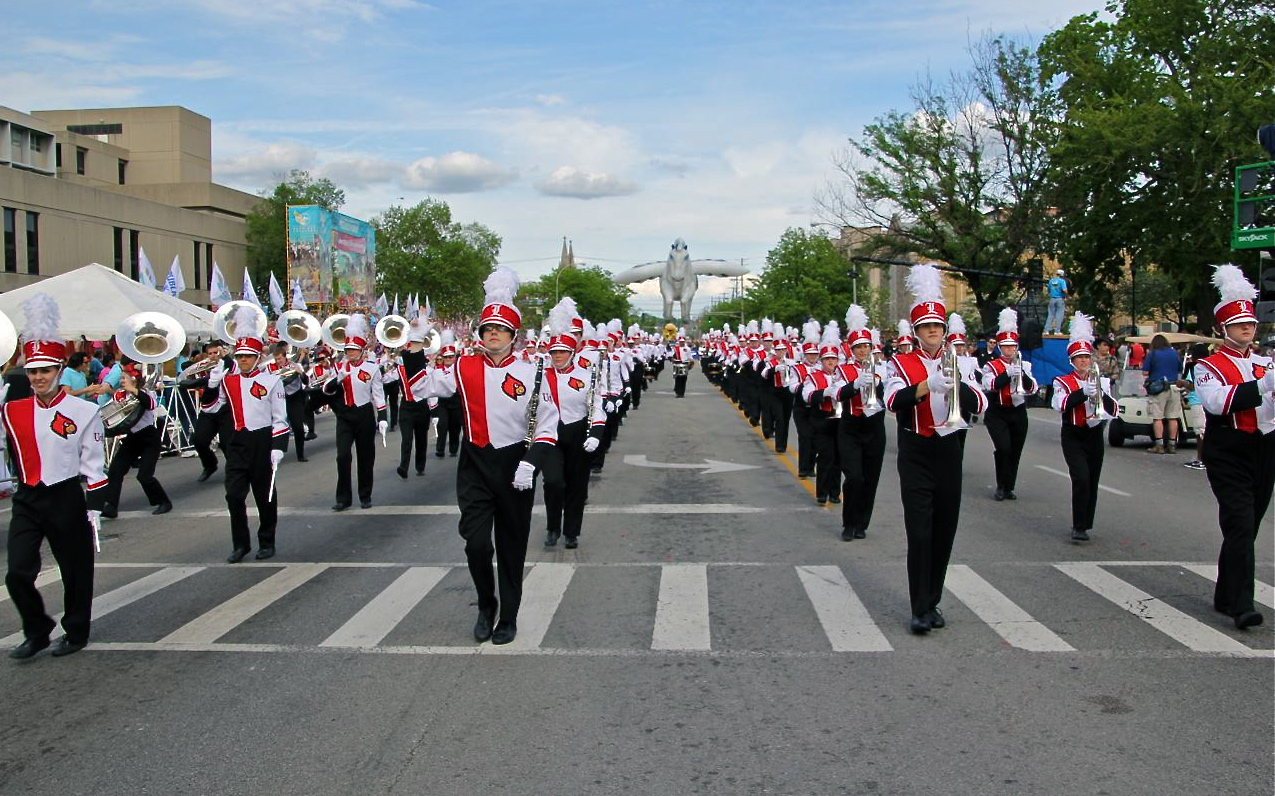
The University of Louisville Cardinal Marching Band appearing at the 2013 Pegasus Parade

The first event held by KDF was the 1956 Pegasus Parade. The parade is held annually on the Thursday before Derby.

NBC Today Show weatherman Willard Scott was the host of WAVE TV's broadcast coverage of the Pegasus Parade from 1982 through 2005.

=== Sports ===
Various sport competitions are held as part of the Festival, including the Derby Festival Volleyball Classic. From 1973 to 2017, the Festival hosted the Derby Festival Basketball Classic. Since 1974, a pro-am golf tournament has been held.

==== Races ====
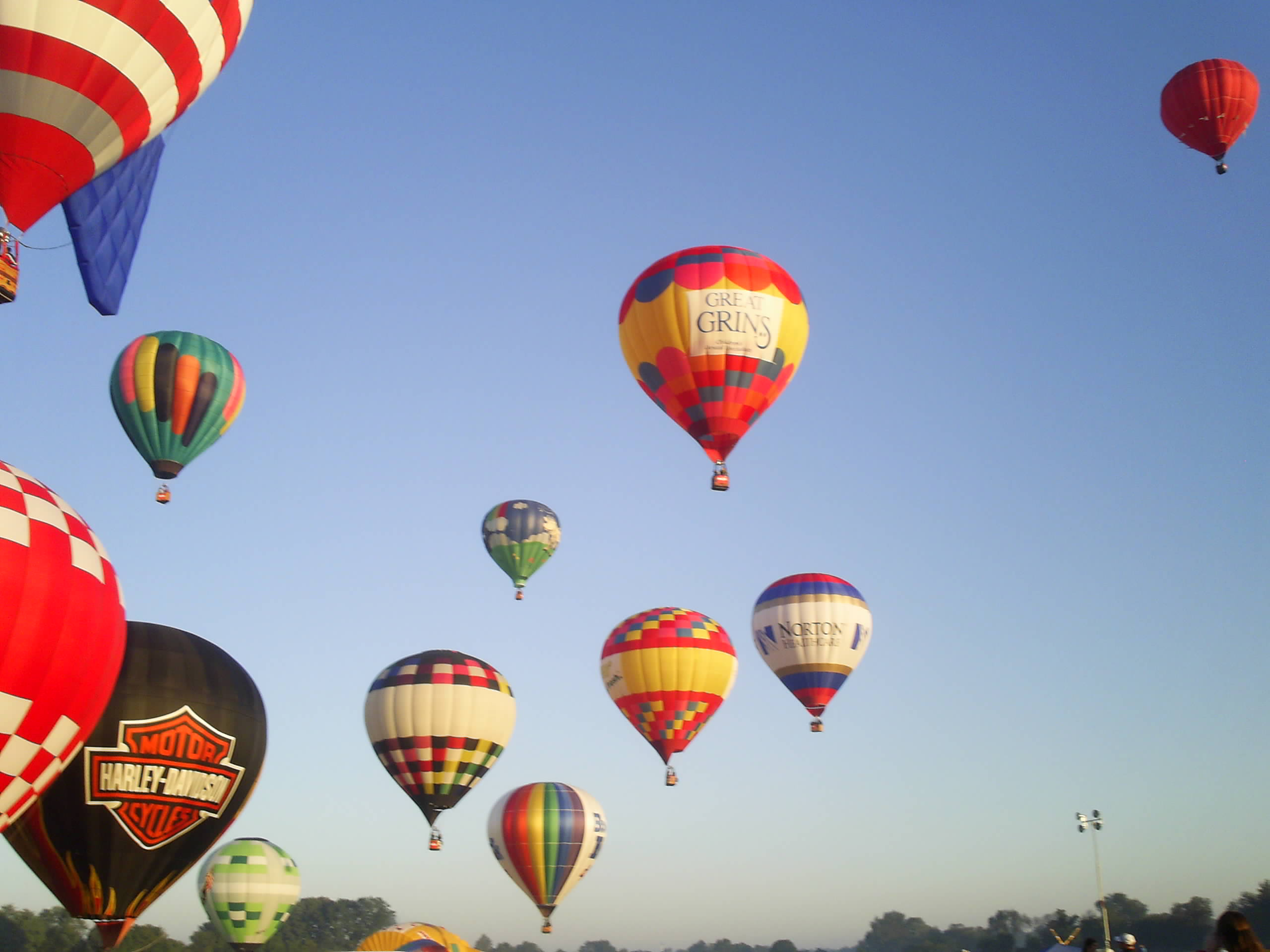
The Great Balloon Race

A number of races take place in the festival. The Kentucky Derby Festival miniMarathon and Marathon occur the Saturday before the Kentucky Derby. The mini has been held since 1974. The marathon route passes by many Louisville landmarks downtown and goes directly through Churchill Downs and Iroquois Park.

That same Saturday is typically also when the Great Balloon Race is held, the culmination of the hot air balloon-themed BalloonFest.

Recognition is given to Louisville's restaurant employees with the Run for the Rosé, where waiters and waitresses run an obstacle course while carrying trays of glasses filled with wine.

For the annual bed races, businesses create themed mobile beds that are paraded before being race on an indoor track with costumed employees. The Great Steamboat Race usually takes place in the week before Derby, where the Belle of Louisville typically takes on at least one challenger.

=== Miscellaneous ===
Since 1997, a spelling bee has been held for the festival.

== Pegasus pins ==
Since 1973, KDF has sold a plastic pin for the Kentucky Derby featuring a pegasus. The pin is used as proof of purchase for admission to a number of the KDF events.

== Derby cruising ==
A controversial aspect of the Derby Festival is "Derby Cruising." Though it is not an official or licensed event during Derby Festival, it takes place in the historically black areas of West Broadway on Derby day and the Friday before it. Cruising consists of motorcycles and cars (many elaborately modified) driving slowly down Broadway, pedestrians crowding the sidewalks, and several blocks closed for a festival with rides and street vendors. The gridlock associated with cruising made it difficult for police to respond to instances of violence during 2005 Derby cruising. In 2006, police made an effort to stop cruising, shutting down Broadway except to emergency vehicles, which resulted in suggestions of racial profiling and much public debate about the legitimacy of Broadway cruising as a free alternative to other festivities.

In 2007, police announced similar plans, although slightly more of Broadway was to remain open, including access to Shawnee Park. The 2007 plan sparked a lawsuit by business owners and a civil rights foundation, claiming the shutdown of Broadway during Derby week violated their constitutional rights and cost them hundreds of thousands of dollars in business. A federal judge allowed the plans to proceed, citing concerns about "public safety and the free flow of traffic".

In 2008, police again banned cruising, but with a new plan allowing traffic to flow but to have a high number of officers on hand to enforce the city's noise and cruising ordinances, the latter of which prevents vehicles from blocking a roadway. Police reported that arrests were down from 2007, although they did shut down a 10-block portion of Broadway for a short time on Derby evening after gridlock developed.

== See also ==
- Hillbilly Outfield: Kentucky Derby party
- List of attractions and events in the Louisville metropolitan area
