= Spirit of Peoria =

Riverboat

Coordinates: 40°41′20″N 89°35′12″W

Riverboat CAPITOL
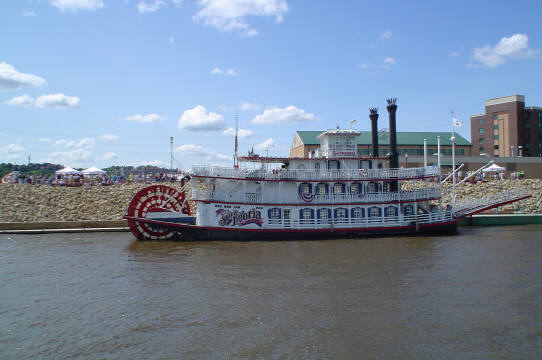
- Spirit of Peoria in the Grand Excursion

History
- Owner: Troy Manthey
- Builder: Walker Boat Yard
- Launched: 1988
- Identification: MMSI number: 367050090; Callsign: WDC6022

General characteristics
- Tonnage: 275 tons
- Length: 160 ft (49 m)
- Draft: 4 ft (1.2 m)
- Decks: 4
- Installed power: 2 × Caterpillar 3412 diesel generator
- Propulsion: 21 ft (6.4 m) paddlewheel
- Speed: 7–10 mph (11–16 km/h)
- Capacity: 385 passengers

Spirit of Peoria is a riverboat that ran in the Peoria, Illinois area from 1988 to 2022. The boat participated in the 2004 Grand Excursion. Spirit of Peoria is a true paddleboat, actually using its paddlewheel for propulsion, unlike some modern riverboats with purely cosmetic wheels.

== Design ==
The boat was designed by architect Alan Bates, and built in 1988 at the Walker Boat Yard in Paducah, Kentucky, making it the first paddleboat vessel built there. The propulsion system was designed by Norm Rittenhouse, with steering by Custom Hydraulics.

Spirit of Peoria has no propellers or thrusters, and is powered by twin Caterpillar 3412 diesel gensets, producing 700 kilowatts combined in 208 volt 3-phase voltage. The AC power is rectified to DC which in turn powers two locomotive traction motors, which drive the paddlewheel via two 40-foot-long (12 m) by 1-foot-wide (0.30 m) chains. This allows the boat to be comparatively fast and efficient, burning approximately 15 US gallons (57 L) of diesel fuel an hour, with a top speed of over 15 mph (24 km/h). The dry weight is about 275 tons, with a passenger capacity of 385. The boat carries 3,500 US gallons (13,000 L) of fuel and 2,500 US gallons (9,500 L) of water.

== History ==
=== Peoria ===
Spirit of Peoria's first voyage in 1988 was captained by Bob Anton.

In 1990, after riverboat gambling was legalized in Illinois and the owners of the Par-A-Dice received a license, the group leased the Spirit to operate on the Peoria side of the river until the East Peoria boat and facility was ready.

After the Par-A-Dice vacated the boat, the Peoria Park District operated the boat for a short time. Due to losing money, the boat was put up for sale and seemed headed for a new destination in Louisville, Kentucky. Lowell "Bud" Grieves purchased the boat with a 25-year lease to keep it in the Peoria area. When Grieves was elected mayor in 1997, he sold his interest in the boat to his son, Alex Grieves.

The regular area of travel of the boat on the Illinois River watershed ranged from Pere Marquette State Park near Grafton, Illinois to Starved Rock State Park near Ottawa, Illinois. The boat was owned and captained by G. Alex Grieves, and co-captained by Alice Grady and Dylan Masonholder.

=== Move from Peoria ===
As of April 2022, the Sprit of Peoria has been sold for $1 million and is no longer docked in Peoria, Illinois. Grieves offered the option to the city of Peoria to purchase the vessel, but the city council waived its right in a 8–3 vote.

The sternwheeler has sailed up the Illinois and Mississippi Rivers to La Crosse, Wisconsin, where she joined the Julia Belle Swain. Both boats will undergo repairs and renovations and will ultimately operated together at a location that is yet unknown. Both boats are owned by Troy Manthey, President and CEO of Yacht Starship Cruises. Manthey is a 5th generation Streckfus family member, of the Streckfus Steamers.

== See also ==
- Julia Belle Swain
