= Louisville, Kentucky =

Most populous city in Kentucky, United States

Louisville
- Consolidated city-county
- Louisville/Jefferson County; Metro Government
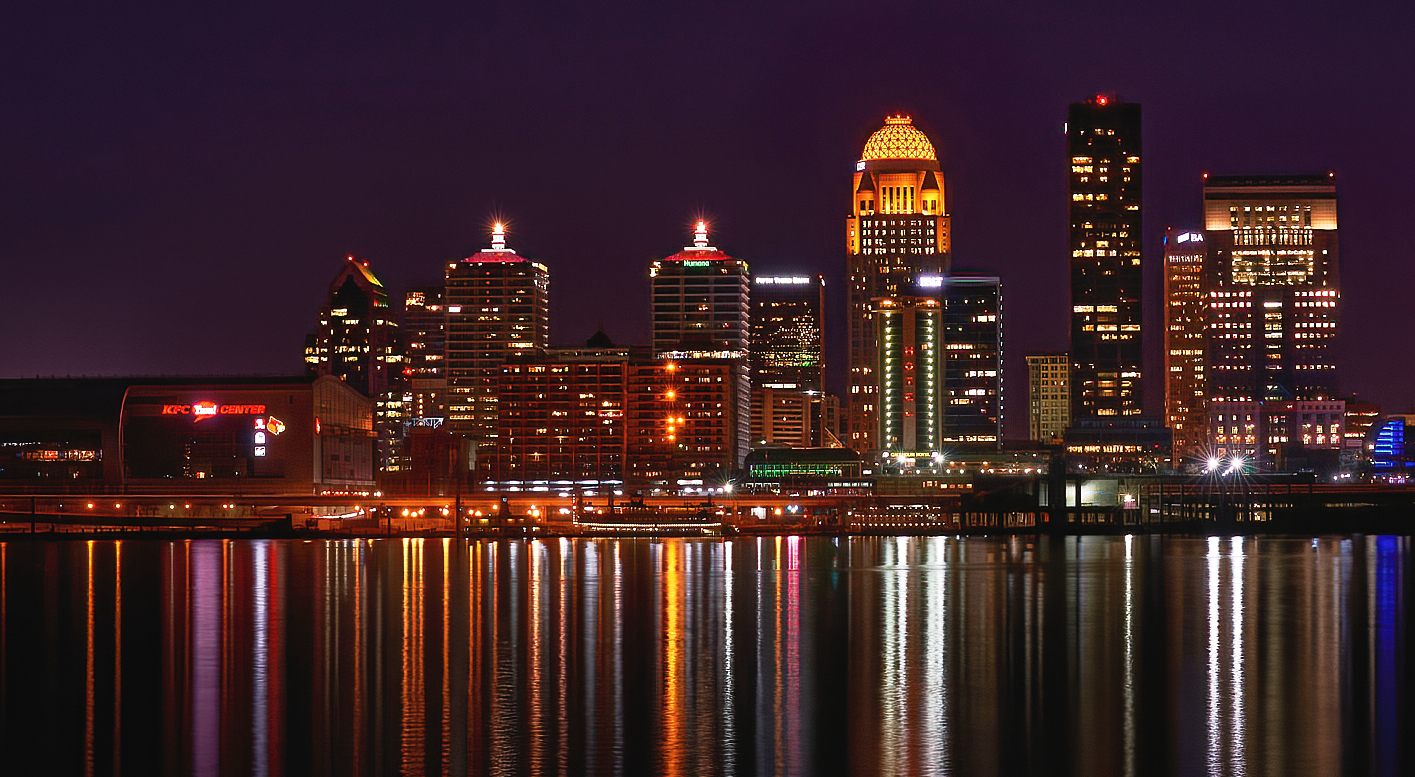
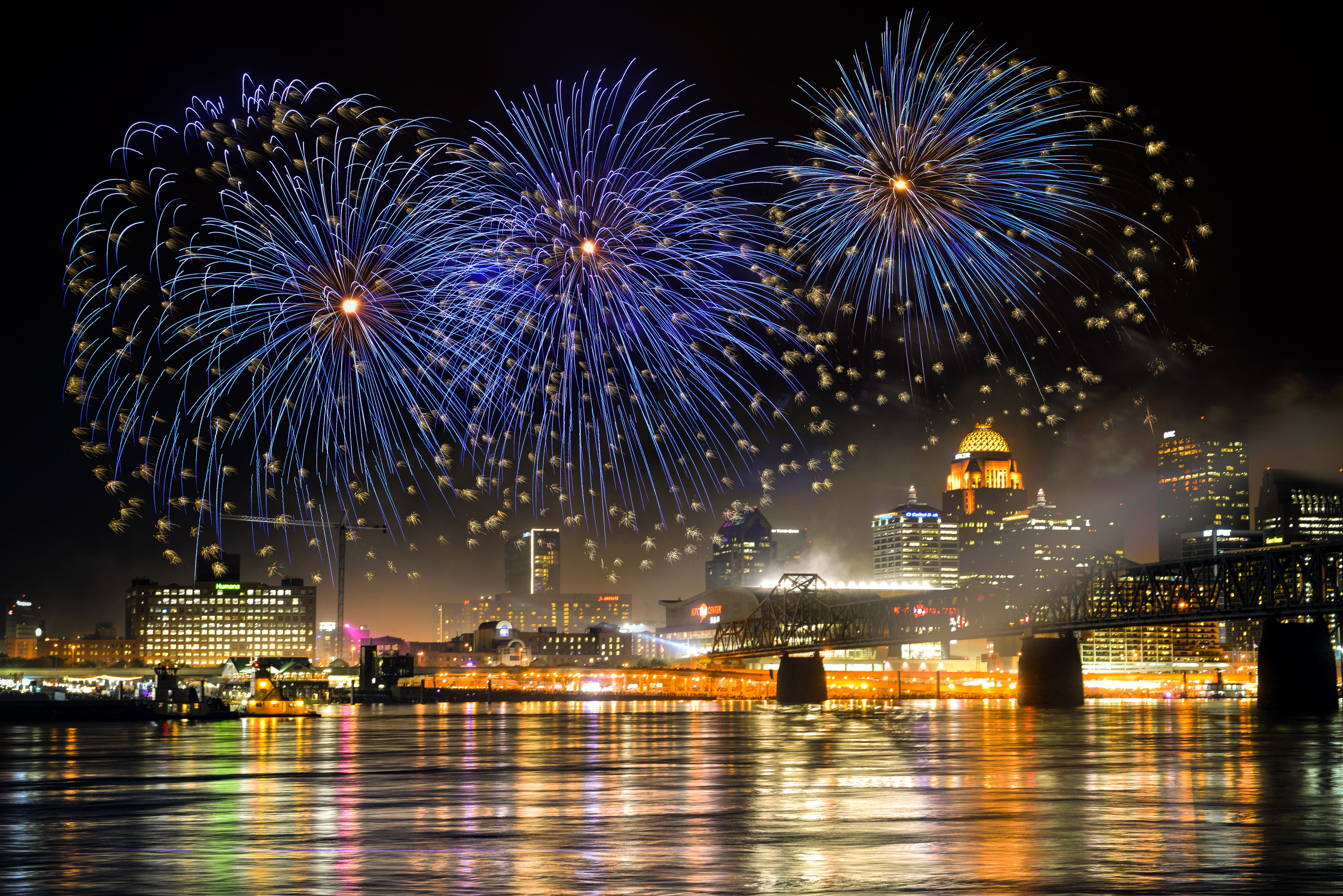
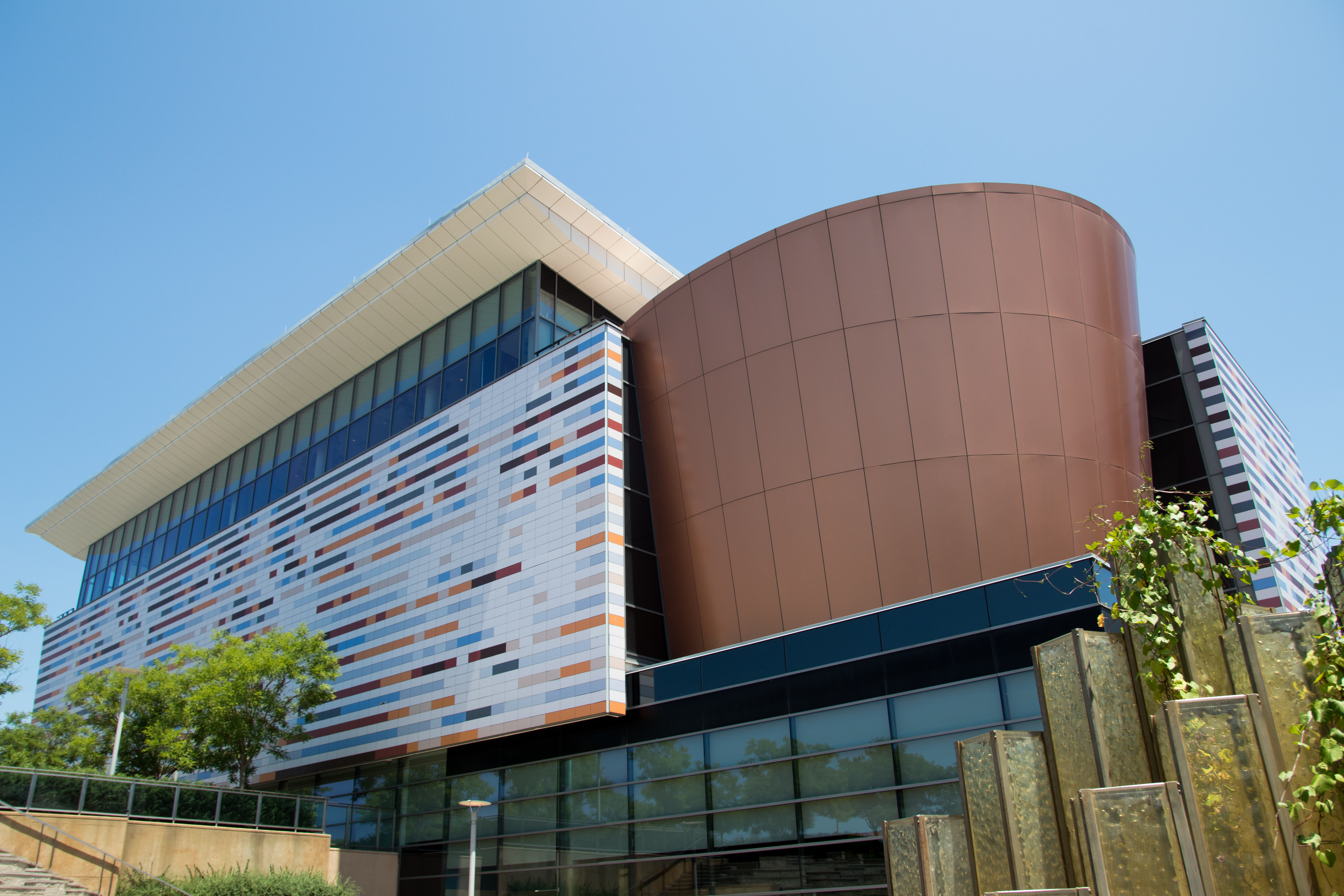
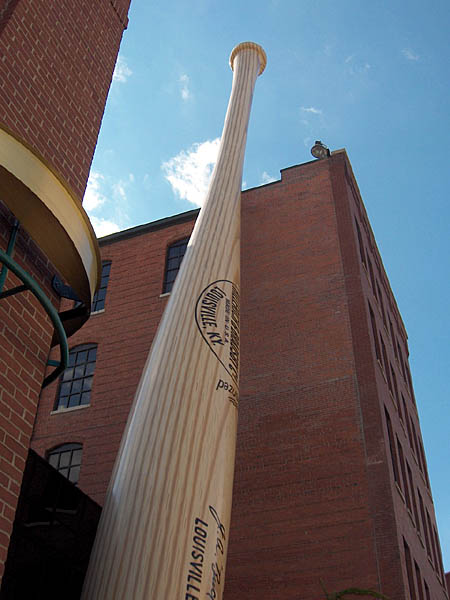
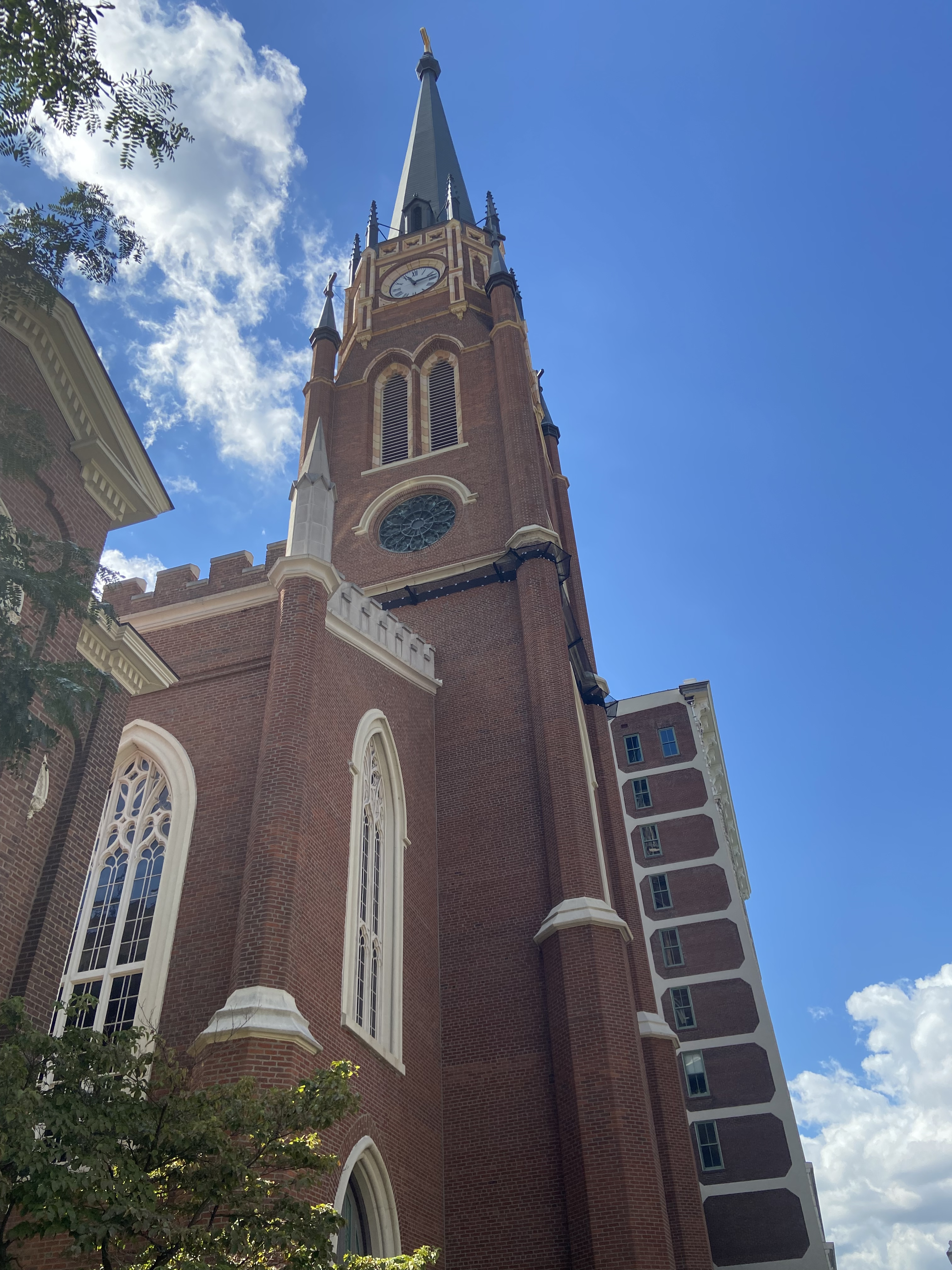
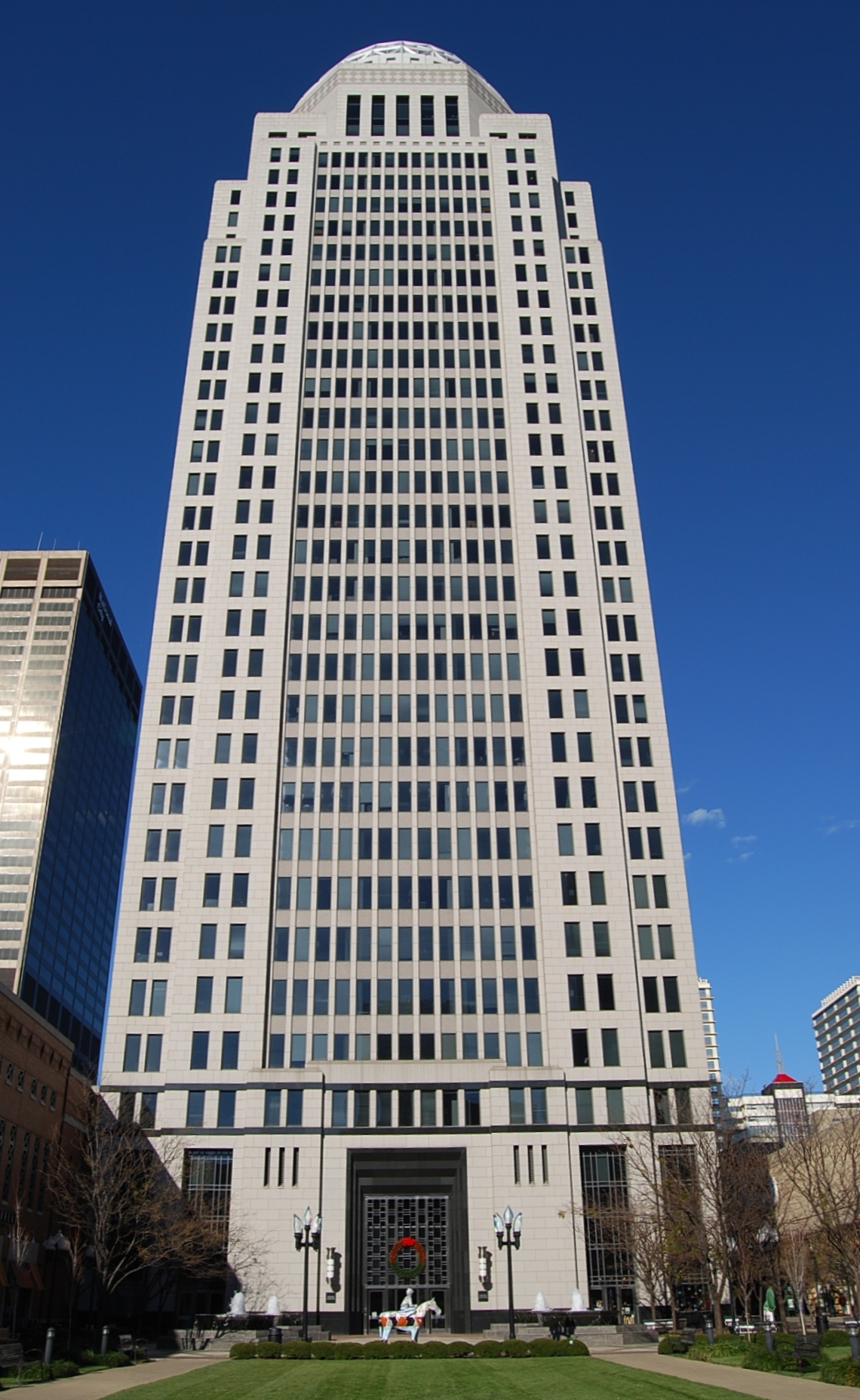
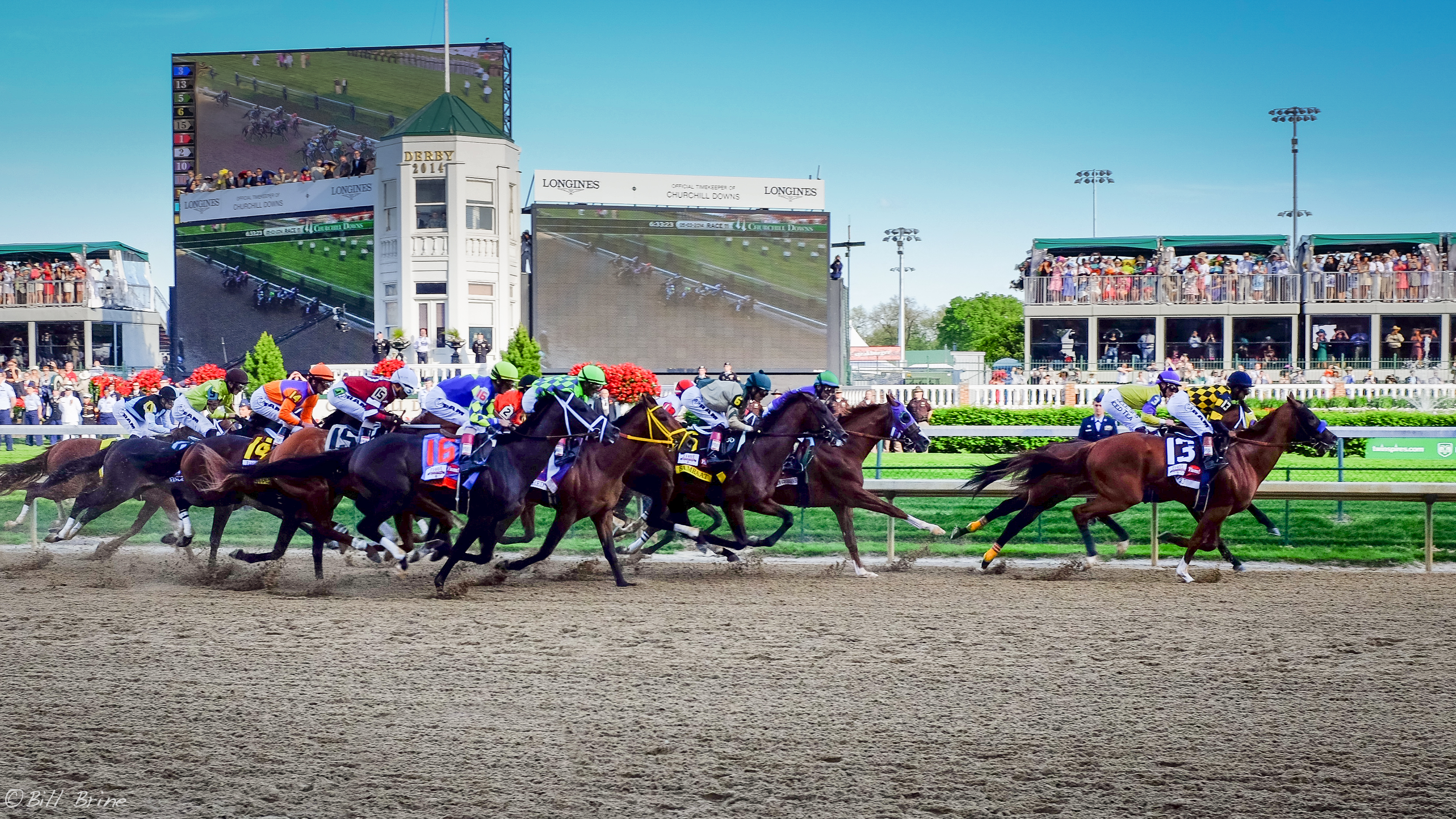
- Downtown Louisville skyline Thunder Over Louisville Muhammad Ali Center Louisville Slugger Museum Cathedral of the Assumption 400 West Market Kentucky Derby

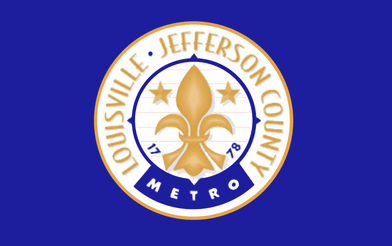
- Flag Seal
- Nicknames: Derby City, River City, (The) Gateway to the South, Falls City, The 'Ville
- *excludes other incorporated places within the county
- Location within Kentucky Location within the United States Location within North America
- Coordinates: 38°15′22″N 85°45′05″W
- Country: United States
- State: Kentucky
- County: Jefferson
- Established: 1778
- Incorporated: 1828
- Founder: George Rogers Clark
- Named for: Louis XVI

Government
  - Type: Mayor–council
  - Mayor: Craig Greenberg (D)
  - Metro Council: 26 council members

Area
  - Consolidated city-county: 341.44 sq mi (884.32 km^{2})
  - Land: 324.94 sq mi (841.59 km^{2})
  - Water: 16.50 sq mi (42.73 km^{2})
- Elevation: 466 ft (142 m)

Population (2020)
  - Consolidated city-county: 633,045
  - Estimate (2025): 641,962 ▲
  - Rank: 76th in North America; 27th in the United States (Note: Louisville's "balance" population is considered in determining rank among cities in the U.S.); 1st in Kentucky
  - Density: 1,948.2/sq mi (752.20/km^{2})
  - Urban: 1,025,000 (US: 46th)
  - Urban density: 2,431/sq mi (938.5/km^{2})
  - Metro: 1,365,557 (US: 43rd)
- Demonym: Louisvillian

GDP
  - MSA: $90.836 billion (2022)
- Time zone: UTC-5 (EST)
  - Summer (DST): UTC-4 (EDT)
- ZIP code prefixes: 40201-40225, 40228-40229, 40231-40233, 40241-40243, 40245, 40250-40253, 40255-40259, 40261, 40266, 40268-40270, 40272, 40280-40283, 40285, 40287, 40289-40299
- Area code: 502
- FIPS code: 21-48000
- FIPS code: 21-48006
- GNIS feature ID: 2404963
- Website: louisvilleky.gov

Louisville (Note: There are varying pronunciations of Louisville: US: /ˈluːəvəl/ LOO-ə-vəl; /ˈluːivɪl/ LOO-ee-vil; and locally /ˈlʊvəl/ LUUV-əl. See § Pronunciation for details.) is a city in the U.S. state of Kentucky, the most populous in the state, the sixth-most populous in the Southeast, and the 27th-most-populous in the United States. By land area, it is the country's 24th-largest city; however, by population density, it is the 265th most dense. (Note: The city population density as of April 1, 2020, census data (residents per unit of land area)) Louisville is the historical county seat and, since 2003, the nominal seat of Jefferson County, on the Indiana state line.

Since 2003, Louisville and Jefferson County have shared the same borders following a city-county merger. The consolidated government is officially called the Louisville/Jefferson County Metro Government, commonly known as Louisville Metro. The term "Jefferson County" is still used in some contexts, especially for incorporated cities outside the "balance" area that defines Louisville proper. The total population of the consolidated area was 782,969 at the 2020 census, while the balance area (excluding other incorporated cities) had a population of 633,045 and is often cited in national statistics. The Louisville metropolitan area, which includes 12 surrounding counties in Kentucky and Southern Indiana, has 1.39 million residents and is the 43rd-largest metropolitan area in the U.S. (Note: The San Juan, Puerto Rico metropolitan area has a higher population than Louisville but is separated from the list because of Puerto Rico's status as a territory.)

Named after King Louis XVI of France, Louisville was founded in 1778 by George Rogers Clark, making it one of the oldest cities west of the Appalachians. With the nearby Falls of the Ohio as the only major obstruction to river traffic between the upper Ohio River and the Gulf of Mexico, the settlement first grew as a portage site. It was the founding city of the Louisville and Nashville Railroad, which grew into a 6,000-mile (9,700 km) system across 13 states. Today, the city is known as the home of boxer Muhammad Ali, the Kentucky Derby, Kentucky Fried Chicken, the University of Louisville and its Cardinals, Louisville Slugger baseball bats, and Fortune 500 companies Humana, BrightSpring Health Services and Yum! Brands. Louisville Muhammad Ali International Airport, the city's main commercial airport, hosts UPS's worldwide hub.

== Pronunciation ==
The proper pronunciation of the name of Louisville is widely debated. The three most popular pronunciations are:

- /ˈluːəvəl/ LOO-ə-vəl,
- /ˈluːivɪl/ LOO-ee-vil, and
- /ˈlʊvəl/ LUUV-əl.

All three are generally considered acceptable; the Louisville Visitor Center says that only the rare /ˈluːɪsvɪl/ LOO-iss-vil is completely unacceptable (though it is the correct pronunciation for the names of several minor cities with that name). There are also acceptable hybrid ways of saying the name, such as /ˈluːəvɪl/ LOO-ə-vil, a mixture of the first and second pronunciations.

The LOO-ə-vəl and LUUV-əl are common local pronunciations. LOO-ee-vil, while respecting the proper pronunciation of the name of the French king who gave Louisville its name, is significantly less common among locals, though some locals do use this pronunciation. It is, however, frequently used by those not from the area. In 2001, local journalist and historian George H. Yater noted that older natives tended toward the second pronunciation, and that both the first and second pronunciations were used equally in local radio and television broadcasting; however, new personalities were taught that the first one was "correct".

== History ==
The history of Louisville spans hundreds of years, and has been influenced by the area's geography and proximity to the Falls of the Ohio River.

=== Early history and founding ===
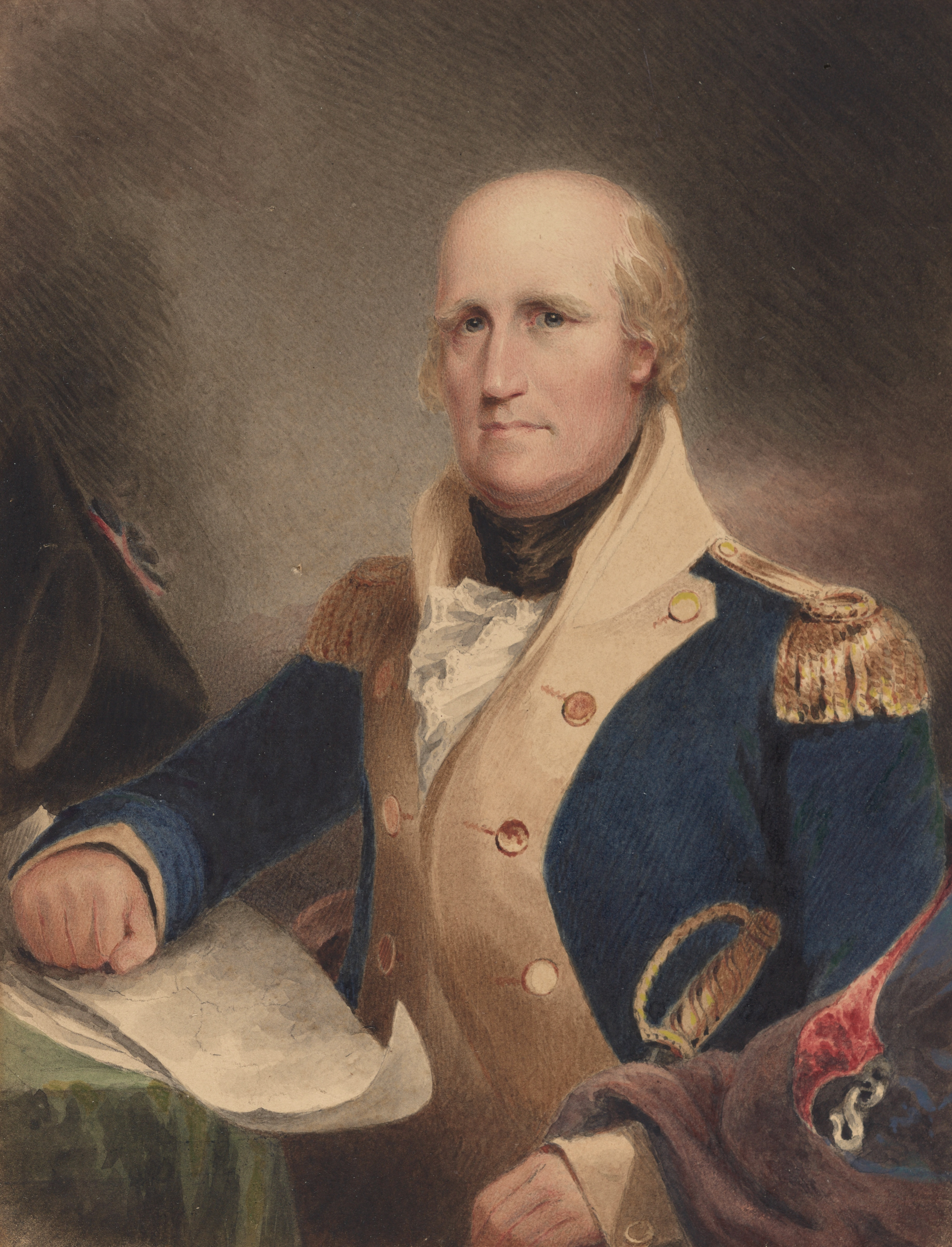
George Rogers Clark founded Louisville in the midst of the Revolutionary War.

Since the Falls created a barrier to river travel, settlements grew at this portage point. The first European settlement in the vicinity of modern-day Louisville was on Corn Island in 1778 by Col. George Rogers Clark, credited as the founder of Louisville. Several landmarks in the community are named after him.

Two years later, in 1780, the Virginia General Assembly approved the town charter of Louisville. The city was named in honor of King Louis XVI of France, whose soldiers were then aiding Americans in the Revolutionary War. Early residents lived in forts to protect themselves from raids from the local indigenous population, but they moved out by the late 1780s. In 1803, explorers Meriwether Lewis and William Clark organized their expedition across America in the town of Clarksville, Indiana at the present-day Falls of the Ohio opposite Louisville, Kentucky.

=== 19th century ===
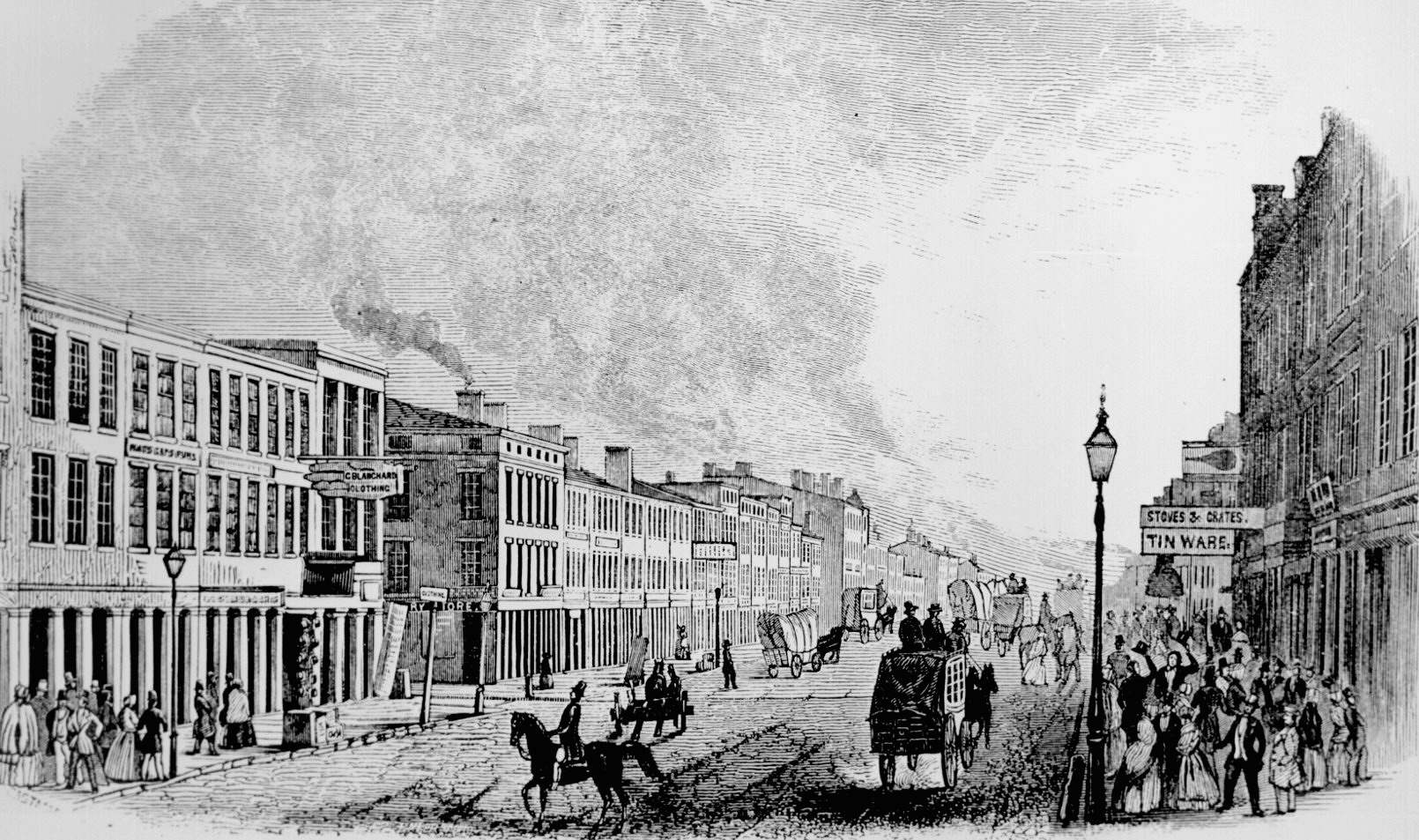
View of 2nd Street and Main Street, Louisville, in 1846

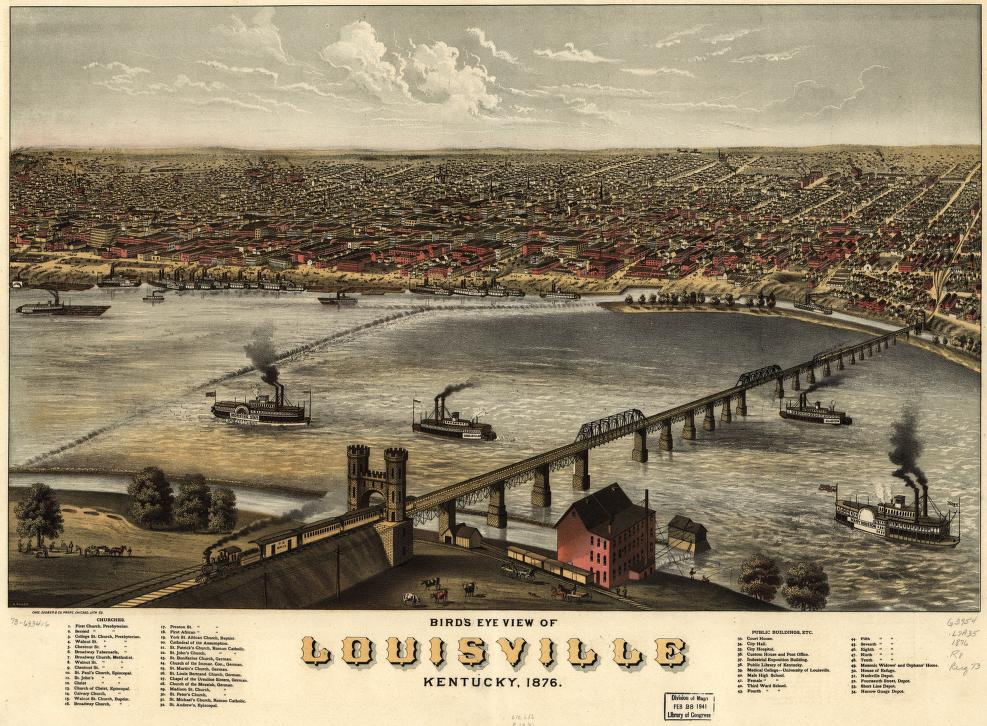
Aerial view of Louisville in 1876

The city's early growth was influenced by the need to unload river boats and move them downriver before reaching the falls. By 1828, the population had grown to 7,000 and Louisville became an incorporated city.

Early Louisville was a major shipping port and enslaved African Americans worked in a variety of associated trades. The city was often a point of escape for fugitive slaves to the north, as Indiana was a free state.

During this point in the 1850s, the city was growing and vibrant. However, ethnic tensions rose, and on August 6, 1855, known as "Bloody Monday", Protestant mobs attacked German and Irish Catholic neighborhoods on election day, resulting in 22 deaths and widespread property damage. Then by 1861, the civil war had broken out. During the Civil War, Louisville was a major stronghold of Union forces, and the center of planning, supplies, recruiting, and transportation for numerous campaigns, especially in the war's Western Theater. By the end of the war, the city of Louisville itself had not been attacked, although skirmishes and battles, including the battles of Perryville and Corydon, took place nearby. After the war, returning Confederate veterans largely took political control of the city, leading to the saying that Louisville joined the Confederacy after the war was over.

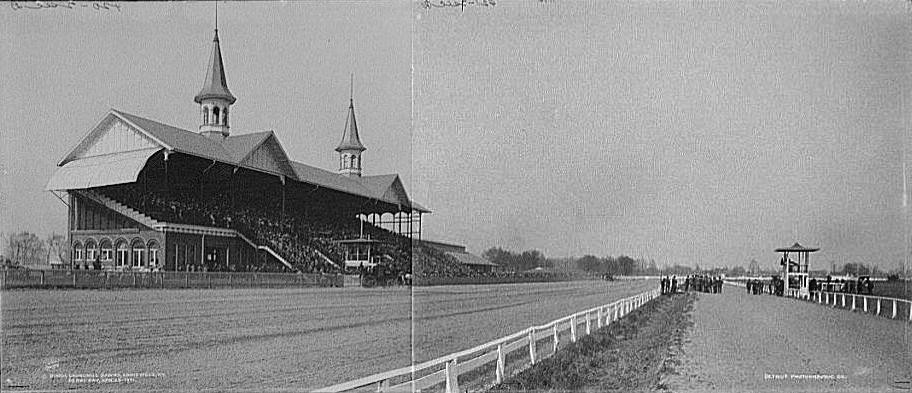
Churchill Downs in 1901

The first Kentucky Derby was held on May 17, 1875, at the Louisville Jockey Club track (later renamed Churchill Downs). The Derby was originally shepherded by Meriwether Lewis Clark Jr., the grandson of William Clark of the Lewis and Clark Expedition, and grandnephew of the city's founder George Rogers Clark. Horse racing had a strong tradition in Kentucky, whose Inner Bluegrass Region had been a center of breeding high-quality livestock throughout the 19th century. Ten thousand spectators watched the first Derby, won by Aristides.

On March 27, 1890, the city was devastated and its downtown nearly destroyed when what 21st century scientists estimate was an F4 tornado tore through as part of the middle Mississippi Valley tornado outbreak. It is estimated that between 74 and 120 people were killed and 200 were injured. The damage cost the city $2.5 million (equivalent to $69 million in 2019). Established in 1896, Neighborhood House Louisville was the first settlement movement house in the state.

=== 20th century ===
Following the Civil War and the Emancipation Proclamation, freed slaves settled in a neighborhood of Louisville called Little Africa, nicknamed "the gateway to the South", near the present neighborhood of Park DuValle. The neighborhood was described as a "thriving community" by the 1920s, and declined between the 1940s and 1950s.

In 1914, the city of Louisville passed a racially based residential zoning code, following Baltimore, Atlanta, and a handful of cities in the Carolinas. The NAACP challenged the ordinance in two cases. Two weeks after the ordinance was enacted, an African-American named Arthur Harris moved into a house on a block designated for whites. He was prosecuted and found guilty. The second case was planned to create a test case. William Warley, the president of the local chapter of the NAACP, tendered a purchase offer on a white block from Charles Buchanan, a white real estate agent. Warley also wrote a letter declaring his intention to build a house on that lot and reside there. With the understanding that the Louisville ordinance made it illegal for him to live there, Warley withheld payment, setting in motion a breach of contract suit by Buchanan. By 1917 the U.S. Supreme Court agreed to hear the case of Buchanan v. Warley. The court struck down the Louisville residential segregation ordinance, ruling that it violated the Fourteenth Amendment's due process clause.

In 1917, shortly after the United States' entry into World War I, Louisville was selected as the site of Camp Zachary Taylor. Camp Taylor was one of the country's largest World War I training camps. It was home of the 84th Infantry Division and trained over 150,000 men by the end of war, including F. Scott Fitzgerald. The camp was closed in 1921. Many of the buildings and infrastructure in the Camp Taylor neighborhood of Louisville are there as a result of the training camp.

In 1929, Louisville completed the lock and dam in the Falls of the Ohio and the city began referring to itself as "where Northern enterprise and Southern hospitality meet". Between the industrial boom of that year and through the Great Depression, Louisville gained 15,000 new residents, about 3% of them black, most fleeing poverty in rural areas.

Throughout January 1937, 19.17 inches (48.7 cm) of rain fell in Louisville, and by January 27, the Ohio River crested at a record 57.15 feet (17.42 m), almost 30 feet (9.1 m) above flood stage. These events triggered the "Great Flood of 1937", which lasted into early February. The flood submerged 60–70 percent of the city, caused complete loss of power for four days, and forced the evacuation of 175,000 or 230,000 residents, depending on sources. 90 people died as a result of the flood. This led to dramatic changes in where residents lived. After the flood, the areas of high elevation in the eastern part of the city had decades of residential growth. Today, the city is protected by numerous flood walls.

Louisville was a center for factory war production during World War II. In May 1942, the U.S. government assigned the Curtiss-Wright Aircraft Company, a war plant located at Louisville's air field, for wartime aircraft production. The factory produced the C-46 Commando cargo plane, among other aircraft. In 1946, the factory was sold to International Harvester, which began large-scale production of tractors and agricultural equipment. In 1950, the Census Bureau reported Louisville's population as 84.3% white and 15.6% black.

Throughout the 1940s, Louisville had more black police officers than any other Southern city, though they were allowed to patrol only black districts. This, in part, made Louisville seem like a more racially progressive city than other Southern cities, although only when black citizens accepted a lower status than white citizens. Many historians have referred to this "veil" of segregation as a "polite" racism. Historian George Wright stated that polite racism "often deluded both blacks and well-meaning whites into believing that real progress was being made in their city". For example, in the city Jim Crow practices were not maintained by law so much as by custom.

Similar to many other older American cities, Louisville began to experience a movement of people and businesses to the suburbs in the 1960s and 1970s. Middle class residents used newly built freeways and interstate highways to commute to work, moving into more distant but newer housing. Because of tax laws, businesses found it cheaper to build new rather than renovate older buildings. Economic changes included a decline in local manufacturing. The West End and older areas of the South End, in particular, began to decline economically as many local factories closed.

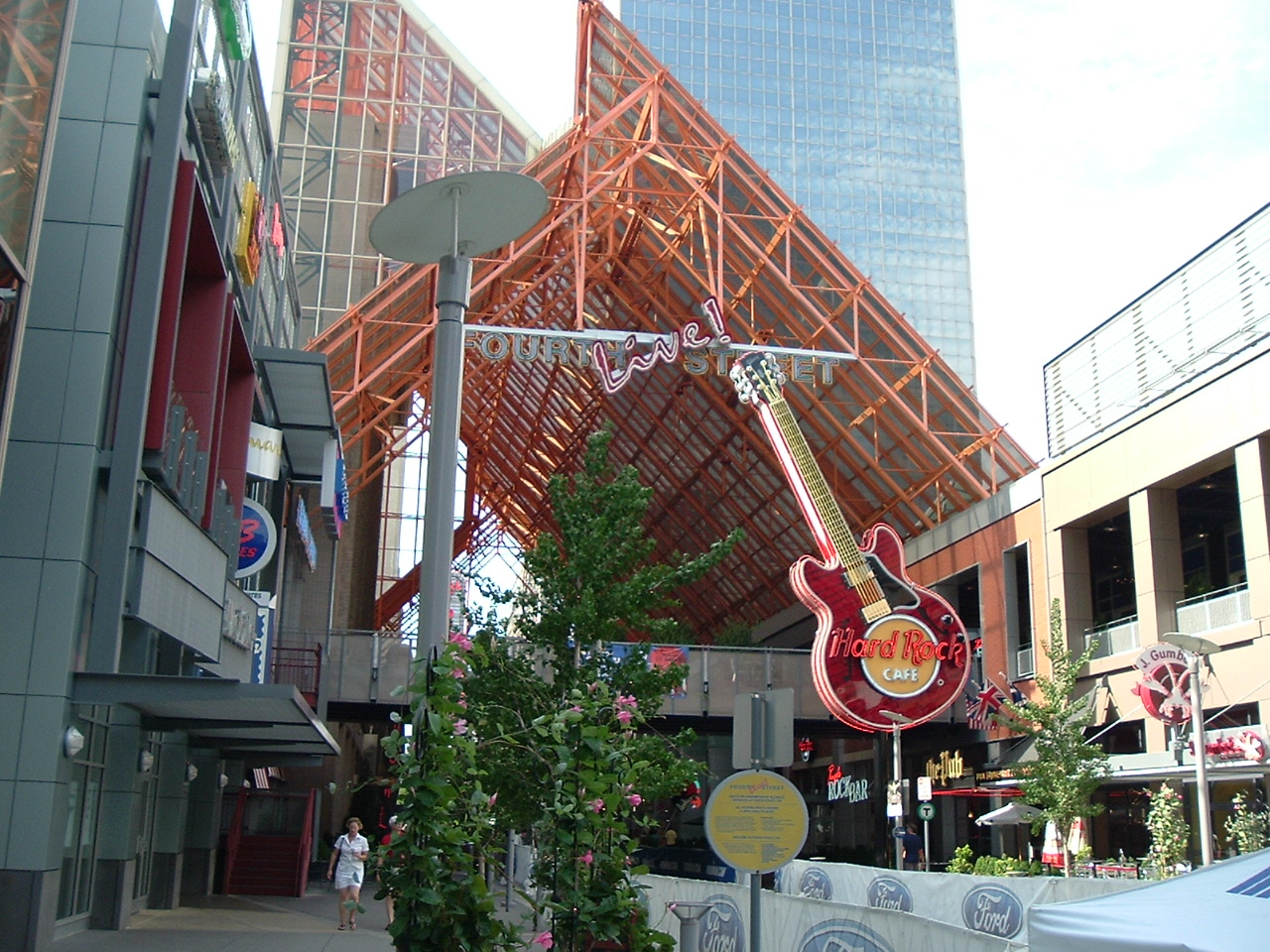
Entrance of Fourth Street Live!

In 1974, a major (F4) tornado hit Louisville as part of the 1974 Super Outbreak of tornadoes that struck 13 states. It covered 21 miles (34 km) and destroyed several hundred homes in the Louisville area, causing two deaths.

Since the 1980s, many of the city's urban neighborhoods have been revitalized into areas popular with young professionals and college students. The greatest change has occurred along the Bardstown Road/Baxter Avenue and Frankfort Avenue corridors as well as the Old Louisville neighborhood. In recent years, such change has also occurred in the East Market District (NuLu).

=== 21st century ===
Since the late 1990s, Downtown has experienced significant residential, tourist and retail growth. Major new sports complexes built include KFC Yum! Center (2010), Louisville Slugger Field (2000), and Lynn Family Stadium (2020). Further, the downtown area has seen the conversion of riverfront industrial sites into Waterfront Park, openings of varied museums (see Museums, galleries and interpretive centers below), and the refurbishing of the former Galleria into the entertainment complex Fourth Street Live!, which opened in 2004.

On March 13, 2020, four plainclothed officers from Louisville Metro Police Department executed a "no-knock" search warrant which led to the killing of Breonna Taylor, a 26-year-old African-American woman. For months afterward, Taylor's family, members of the local community, and people around the world protested to demand that officers involved in the shooting be fired and criminally charged. These protests and demonstrations coincided and intertwined with the international George Floyd protests, as well as the Black Lives Matter movement and a broader movement of racial unrest. As a result of the incident, the police chief was fired and four officers received federal charges, but no significant systemic changes were made.

On April 10, 2023, a mass shooting occurred at the Old National Bank, killing five people, and injuring nine others. The suspect, who was a bank employee and who officials said was livestreaming the rampage, was killed by the police after exchanging fire with them.

On November 4, 2025, a McDonnell Douglas MD-11 cargo plane operating as UPS Airlines Flight 2976 crashed shortly after takeoff from Louisville Muhammad Ali International Airport, killing 14 people, injuring 15, and igniting a large fire. Several buildings near the airport, including a petroleum recycling center, were struck or set on fire. The cause of the crash is under investigation.

=== Firsts ===
The five-year Southern Exposition in Louisville, the second-largest American exhibition to date in 1883, had the largest to-date installation of light bulbs by their recent inventor and then-former resident Thomas Edison. Louisville also established the first free public library in the US to be staffed by and provide services exclusively for African Americans in 1905.

Medical advances in Louisville include the first human hand transplant in the US in 1999 and the first self-contained artificial heart transplant in 2001.

== Geography ==
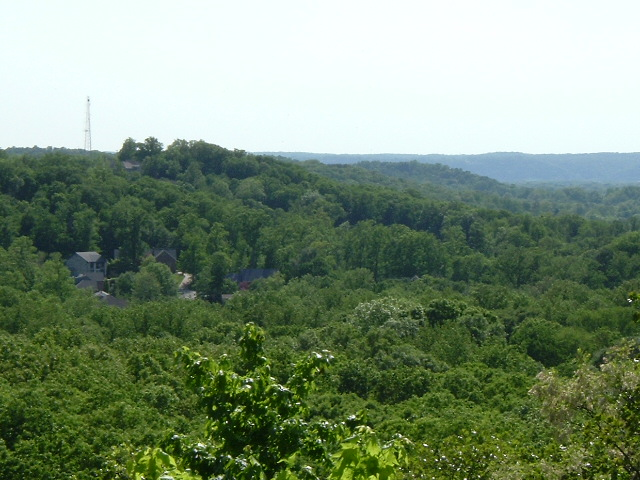
Hilly terrain blankets the southwest part of the city.

Louisville and Jefferson County have a combined area of 397.68 square miles (1,030.0 km^{2}), of which 380.46 square miles (985.4 km^{2}) is land and 17.23 square miles (44.6 km^{2}) (4.33%) is covered by water.

Louisville is southeasterly situated along the border between Kentucky and Indiana, the Ohio River, in north-central Kentucky at the Falls of the Ohio. Louisville is an Upper South city located in a Southern state that is influenced by both Southern and Midwestern culture. It is sometimes referred to as either one of the northernmost Southern cities or as one of the southernmost Northern cities in the United States.

Louisville is located in Kentucky's outer Bluegrass region. Its development has been influenced by its location on the Ohio River, which spurred Louisville's growth from an isolated camp site into a major shipping port. Much of the city is located on a very wide and flat floodplain surrounded by hill country on all sides. Much of the area was swampland that had to be drained as the city grew. In the 1840s, most creeks were rerouted or placed in canals to prevent flooding and disease outbreaks.

Areas generally east of I-65 are above the flood plain, and are composed of gently rolling hills. The southernmost parts of Jefferson County are in the scenic and largely undeveloped Knobs region, which is home to Jefferson Memorial Forest.

The Louisville-Jefferson County, KY-IN Metropolitan Statistical Area (MSA), the 43rd largest in the United States, includes the Kentucky county of Jefferson (coterminous with Louisville Metro), plus twelve outlying counties—seven in Kentucky and five in Southern Indiana. Louisville's MSA is included in the Louisville–Elizabethtown–Madison, KY–IN Combined Statistical Area (CSA), which also includes the Elizabethtown, KY MSA, as well as the Madison, IN Micropolitan Statistical Area.

The Louisville area is near several other urban areas, especially Frankfort, Kentucky (the state's capital); Cincinnati, Ohio (the two cities' metropolitan statistical areas almost border each other); Lexington, Kentucky; Bowling Green, Kentucky; Nashville, Tennessee; and the Indianapolis, Indiana area (especially Columbus, Indiana, to the north of Southern Indiana).

=== Cityscape ===
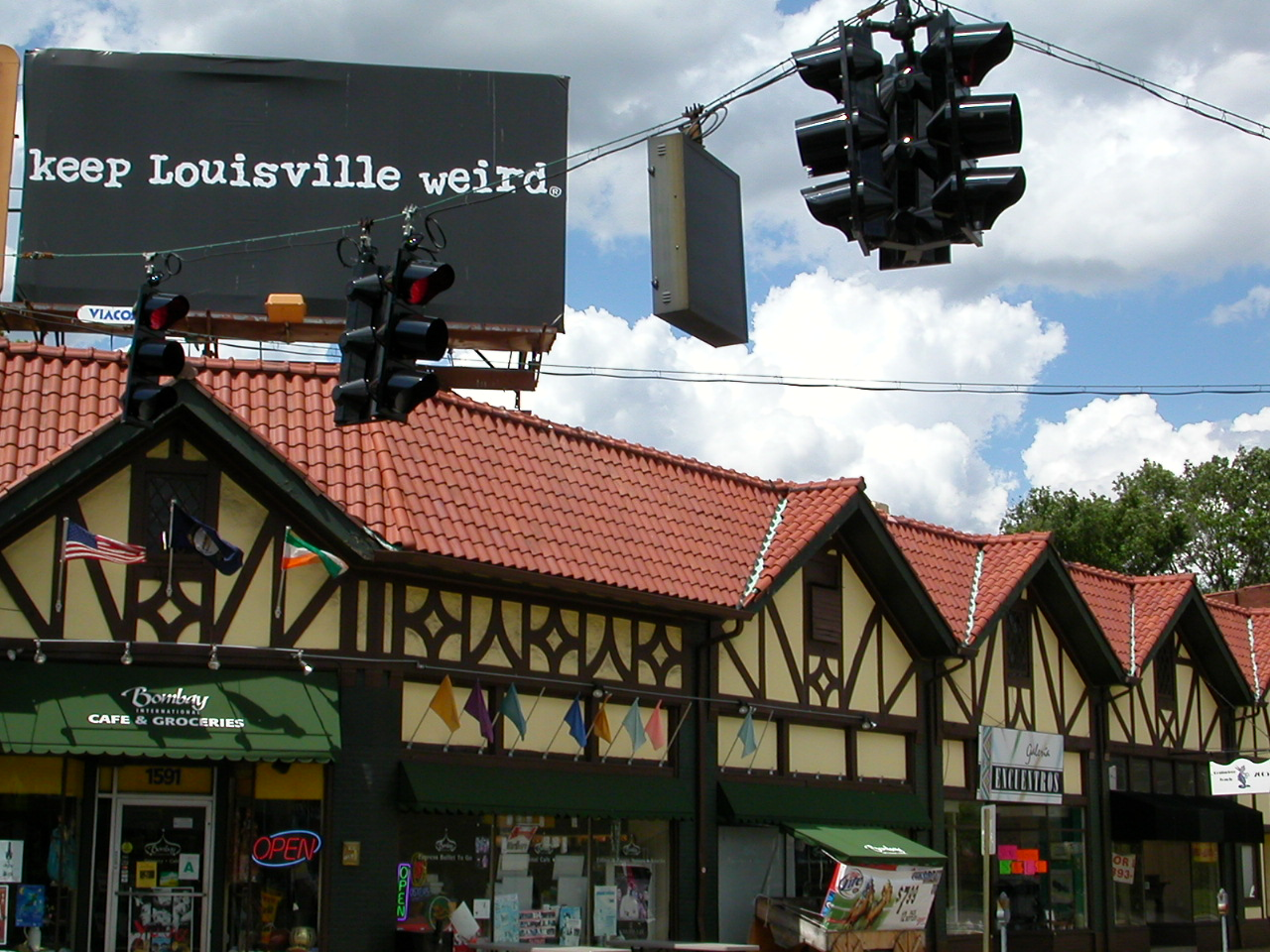
Highlands district, specifically the Bonnycastle neighborhood

The downtown business district of Louisville is located immediately south of the Ohio River and southeast of the Falls of the Ohio. Major roads extend outwards from the downtown area in all directions. The airport is about 6.75 miles (10.86 km) south of the downtown area. The industrial sections of town are to the south and west of the airport, while most of the residential areas of the city are to the southwest, south, and east of downtown. In 2010, the 22,000-seat KFC Yum! Center was completed. Twelve of the 15 buildings in Kentucky over 300 feet (91 m) are located in downtown Louisville.

Another primary business and industrial district is located in the suburban area east of the city on Hurstbourne Parkway.

Louisville's late 19th- and early 20th-century development was spurred by three large suburban parks built at the edges of the city in 1890.

The city's architecture is a blend of old and new. The Old Louisville neighborhood is the largest historic preservation district solely featuring Victorian homes and buildings in the United States; it is also the third-largest district containing such architectural distinctions in the United States. Many modern skyscrapers are located downtown, as well as older preserved structures, such as the Southern National Bank building. The buildings of West Main Street in downtown Louisville have the largest collection of cast iron facades of anywhere outside of New York's SoHo neighborhood.

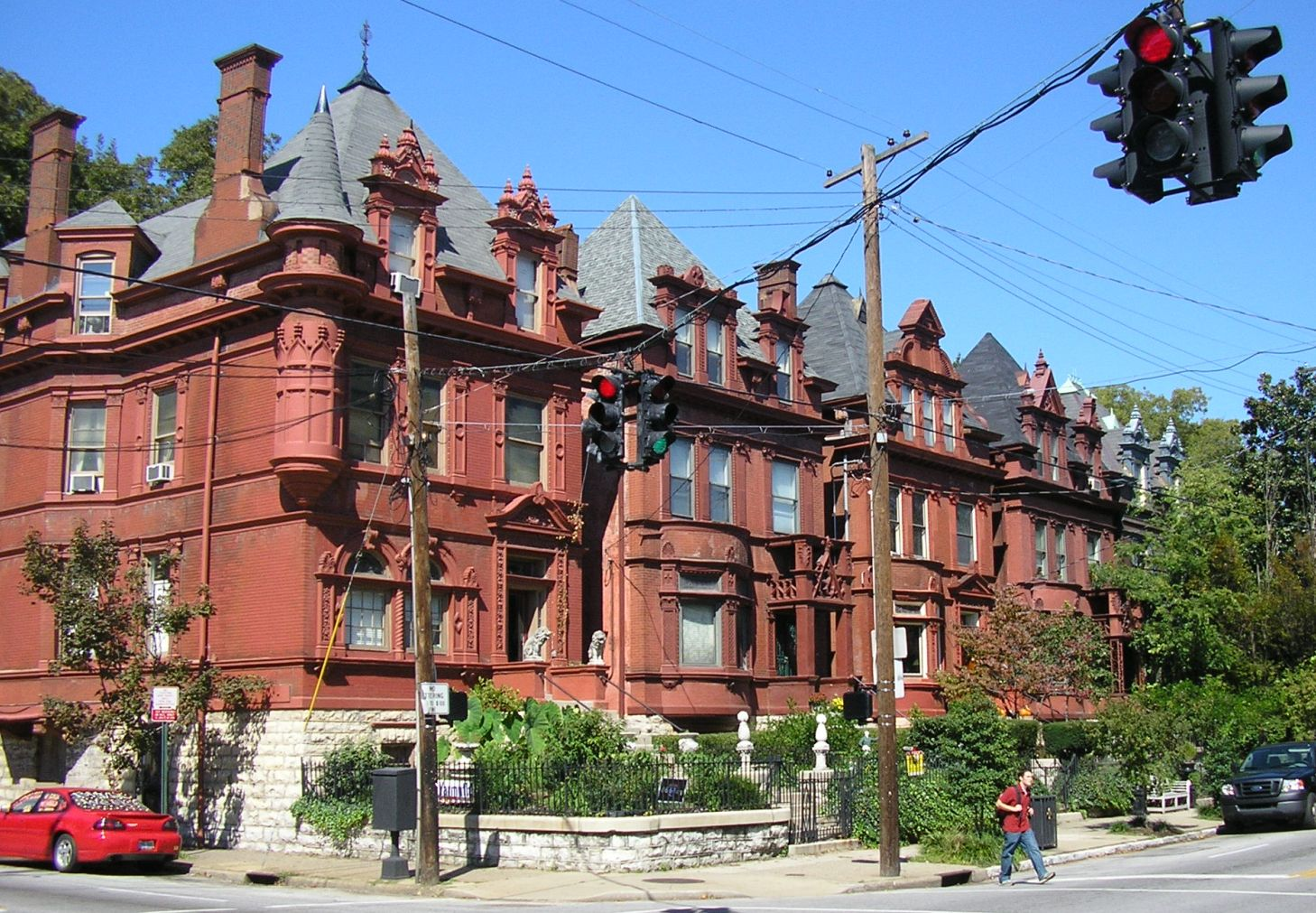
Werne's Row in Old Louisville

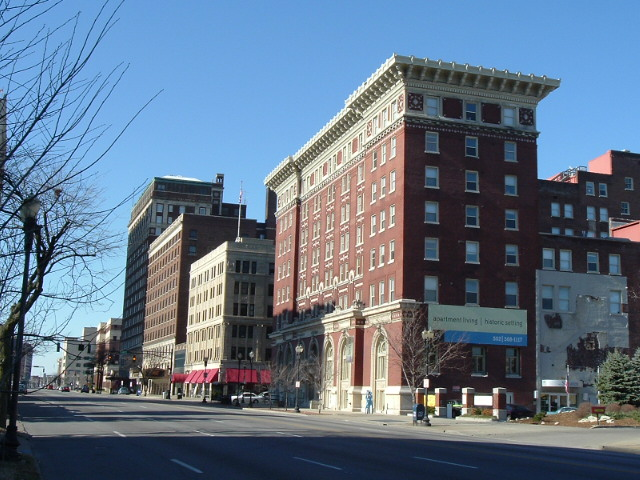
Broadway and 3rd Street downtown

Since the mid-20th century, Louisville has in some ways been divided into three sides of town: the West End, the South End, and the East End. In 2003, Bill Dakan, a University of Louisville geography professor, said that the West End, west of 7th Street and north of Algonquin Parkway, is "a euphemism for the African American part of town" although he points out that this belief is not entirely true, and most African Americans no longer live in areas where more than 80% of residents are black. Nevertheless, he says the perception is still strong. The South End has long had a reputation as a white, working-class part of town, while the East End has been seen as middle and upper class.

According to the Greater Louisville Association of Realtors, the area with the lowest median home sales price is west of Interstate 65, in the West and South Ends. The middle range of home sales prices are between Interstates 64 and 65 in the South and East Ends, and the highest median home sales price are north of Interstate 64 in the East End. Immigrants from Southeast Asia tend to settle in the South End, while immigrants from Eastern Europe settle in the East End.

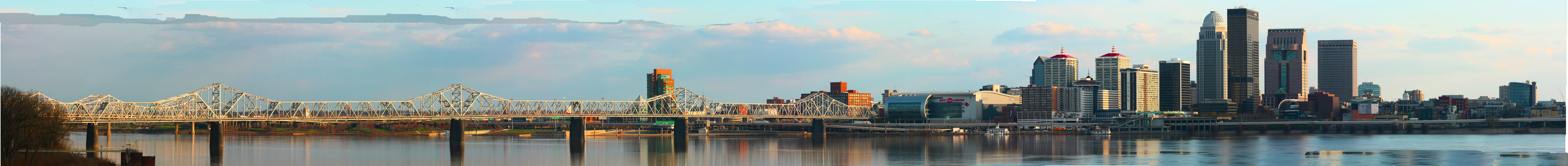
Panorama from Jeffersonville, Indiana, with George Rogers Clark Memorial Bridge in foreground

=== Climate ===
Louisville has a humid subtropical climate (Köppen Cfa), typical of the Upper South, and is located in USDA plant hardiness zone 7a. Springlike conditions typically begin in mid-to-late March, summer from mid-to-late-May to late September, with fall in the October–November period. Seasonal extremes in both temperature and precipitation are not uncommon during early spring and late fall; severe weather is not uncommon, with occasional tornado outbreaks in the region. Winter typically brings a mix of rain, sleet, and snow, with occasional heavy snowfall and icing. Louisville averages 4.5 days with low temperatures dipping to 10 °F (−12 °C); the first and last freezes of the season on average fall on November 2 and April 5, respectively. Summer is typically hazy, hot, and humid with long periods of 90–100 °F (32–38 °C) temperatures and drought conditions at times. Louisville averages 38 days a year with high temperatures at or above 90 °F (32 °C). The mean annual temperature is 58.2 °F (14.6 °C), with an average annual snowfall of 12.7 inches (32 cm) and an average annual rainfall of 44.9 inches (1,140 mm).

The wettest seasons are spring and summer, although rainfall is fairly constant year round. During the winter, particularly in January and February, several days of snow can be expected. January is the coldest month, with a mean temperature of 34.9 °F (1.6 °C). July is the average hottest month with a mean of 79.3 °F (26.3 °C). The highest recorded temperature was 107 °F (42 °C), which last occurred on July 14, 1936, and the lowest recorded temperature was −22 °F (−30 °C) on January 19, 1994. In 2012, Louisville had the fourth-hottest summer on record, with the temperature rising up to 106 °F (41 °C) in July and the June all-time monthly record high temperature being broken on two consecutive days. As the city exemplifies the urban heat island effect, temperatures in commercial areas and in the industrialized areas along interstates are often higher than in the suburbs, often as much as 5 °F (2.8 °C).

Climate data for Louisville International Airport, Kentucky (1991–2020 normals, (Note: Mean monthly maxima and minima (i.e. the expected highest and lowest temperature readings at any point during the year or given month) calculated based on data at said location from 1991 to 2020.) extremes 1872–present (Note: Official records for Louisville were kept at the Weather Bureau Office from August 1872 to June 1945, Bowman Field from July 1945 to November 1947, Louisville Int'l from December 1947 to October 1995, the Weather Forecast Office (38.1150°N 85.6450°W) from November 1995 to December 2005, and again at Louisville Int'l since January 2006. For more information, see Threadex))
Month	Jan	Feb	Mar	Apr	May	Jun	Jul	Aug	Sep	Oct	Nov	Dec	Year
Record high °F (°C)	77 (25)	82 (28)	89 (32)	91 (33)	98 (37)	105 (41)	107 (42)	105 (41)	104 (40)	97 (36)	85 (29)	76 (24)	107 (42)
Mean maximum °F (°C)	65.2 (18.4)	70.4 (21.3)	77.8 (25.4)	84.1 (28.9)	89.0 (31.7)	93.6 (34.2)	95.7 (35.4)	95.6 (35.3)	92.9 (33.8)	85.4 (29.7)	75.1 (23.9)	67.0 (19.4)	97.3 (36.3)
Mean daily maximum °F (°C)	43.6 (6.4)	48.3 (9.1)	58.1 (14.5)	69.6 (20.9)	77.8 (25.4)	85.7 (29.8)	89.0 (31.7)	88.4 (31.3)	82.2 (27.9)	70.5 (21.4)	57.6 (14.2)	47.2 (8.4)	68.2 (20.1)
Daily mean °F (°C)	35.7 (2.1)	39.5 (4.2)	48.4 (9.1)	59.0 (15.0)	68.3 (20.2)	76.4 (24.7)	79.9 (26.6)	78.9 (26.1)	72.0 (22.2)	60.3 (15.7)	48.5 (9.2)	39.6 (4.2)	58.9 (14.9)
Mean daily minimum °F (°C)	27.8 (−2.3)	30.7 (−0.7)	38.6 (3.7)	48.5 (9.2)	58.7 (14.8)	67.2 (19.6)	70.8 (21.6)	69.5 (20.8)	61.9 (16.6)	50.1 (10.1)	39.4 (4.1)	32.1 (0.1)	49.6 (9.8)
Mean minimum °F (°C)	6.0 (−14.4)	11.4 (−11.4)	20.3 (−6.5)	31.7 (−0.2)	41.9 (5.5)	53.6 (12.0)	60.5 (15.8)	58.7 (14.8)	46.9 (8.3)	33.7 (0.9)	23.1 (−4.9)	13.0 (−10.6)	3.3 (−15.9)
Record low °F (°C)	−22 (−30)	−19 (−28)	−1 (−18)	21 (−6)	31 (−1)	42 (6)	49 (9)	45 (7)	33 (1)	23 (−5)	−1 (−18)	−15 (−26)	−22 (−30)
Average precipitation inches (mm)	3.39 (86)	3.41 (87)	4.60 (117)	4.80 (122)	5.18 (132)	4.27 (108)	4.05 (103)	3.71 (94)	3.66 (93)	3.72 (94)	3.42 (87)	4.13 (105)	48.34 (1,228)
Average snowfall inches (cm)	4.5 (11)	4.1 (10)	2.1 (5.3)	0.1 (0.25)	0.0 (0.0)	0.0 (0.0)	0.0 (0.0)	0.0 (0.0)	0.0 (0.0)	0.1 (0.25)	0.3 (0.76)	2.2 (5.6)	13.4 (34)
Average precipitation days (≥ 0.01 in)	11.2	10.4	12.1	11.9	12.6	10.5	10.2	8.2	7.9	7.9	9.8	11.8	124.5
Average snowy days (≥ 0.1 in)	3.7	3.7	1.7	0.1	0.0	0.0	0.0	0.0	0.0	0.0	0.6	2.5	12.3
Average relative humidity (%)	68.6	68.1	64.0	61.5	67.2	68.9	70.9	71.7	72.9	69.9	69.4	70.2	68.6
Mean monthly sunshine hours	140.5	148.9	188.6	221.1	263.4	288.9	293.6	272.6	234.3	208.5	135.7	118.3	2,514.4
Percentage possible sunshine	46	49	51	56	60	65	65	65	63	60	45	40	56
Average ultraviolet index	1.8	2.8	4.6	6.5	8.0	8.9	9.1	8.2	6.4	4.0	2.3	1.6	5.3
Source 1: NOAA (relative humidity and sun 1961–1990)
Source 2: UV Index Today (1995 to 2022)

== Demographics ==
Historical population
Census	Pop.	Note	%±
1790	200		—
1800	359		79.5%
1810	1,357		278.0%
1820	4,012		195.7%
1830	10,341		157.8%
1840	21,210		105.1%
1850	43,194		103.6%
1860	68,033		57.5%
1870	100,753		48.1%
1880	123,758		22.8%
1890	161,129		30.2%
1900	204,731		27.1%
1910	223,928		9.4%
1920	234,891		4.9%
1930	307,745		31.0%
1940	319,077		3.7%
1950	369,129		15.7%
1960	390,639		5.8%
1970	361,706		−7.4%
1980	298,694		−17.4%
1990	269,063		−9.9%
2000	256,231		−4.8%
2010	597,337		133.1%
2020	633,045		6.0%
2025 (est.)	641,962	▲	1.4%
U.S. Decennial Census; In 2003, Louisville merged with Jefferson County and population counts were combined thereafter. 2010–2020

Between 1970 and 2000, Louisville lost population each decade. As of the 2000 census, Louisville had a population of 256,231, down from the 1990 census population of 269,063. Due to the city-county merger that occurred in 2003, which expanded the city limits, the city's population increased to 597,337 at the 2010 census count.

=== 2020 census ===
Louisville city, Kentucky – racial and ethnic composition Note: the US Census treats Hispanic/Latino as an ethnic category. This table excludes Latinos from the racial categories and assigns them to a separate category. Hispanics/Latinos may be of any race.
Race / ethnicity (NH = Non-Hispanic)	Pop. 2010	Pop. 2020	% 2010	% 2020
White alone (NH)	408,157	382,096	68.33%	60.36%
Black or African American alone (NH)	135,138	147,069	22.62%	23.23%
Native American or Alaska Native alone (NH)	1,289	1,206	0.22%	0.19%
Asian alone (NH)	12,764	21,034	2.14%	3.32%
Pacific Islander alone (NH)	347	493	0.06%	0.08%
Some other race alone (NH)	1,018	3,064	0.17%	0.48%
Mixed-race/multi-racial (NH)	11,834	27,900	1.98%	4.41%
Hispanic or Latino (any race)	26,790	50,183	4.48%	7.93%
Total	597,337	633,045	100.00%	100.00%

Louisville is the largest city in Kentucky, with 17.1% of the state's total population as of 2010; the balance's percentage was 13.8%.

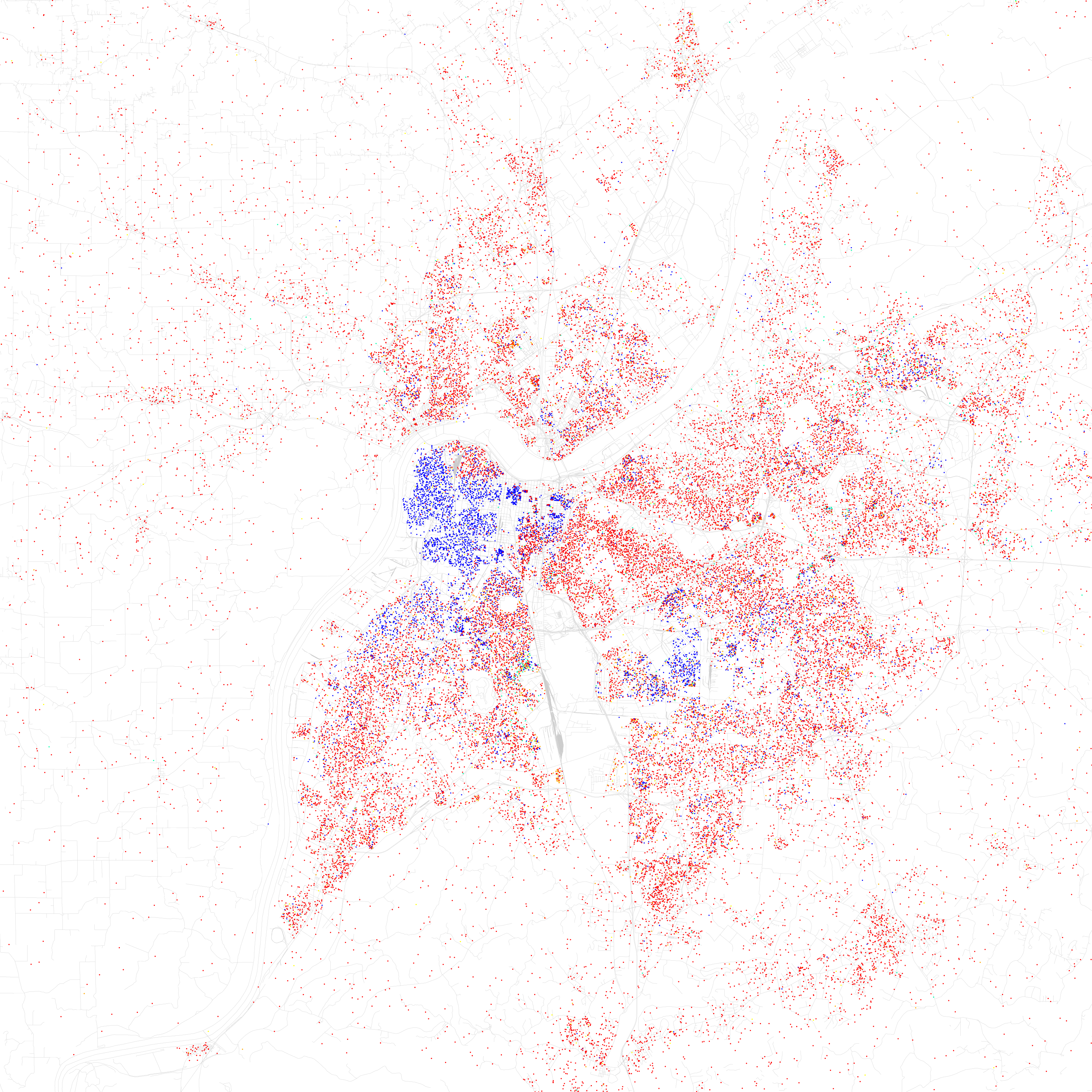
Map of racial distribution in Louisville, 2010 U.S. Census. Each dot is 25 people: ⬤ White ⬤ African American ⬤ Asian ⬤ Hispanic ⬤ Other

The 2007 demographic breakdown for the entire Louisville Metro area was 74.8% White (71.7% non-Hispanic), 22.2% African American, 0.6% Native American, 2.0% Asian, 0.1% Hawaiian or Pacific islander, 1.4% other, and 1.6% multiracial. About 2.9% of the total population was identified as Hispanic of any race. During the same year, the area of premerger Louisville consisted 60.1% White, 35.2% African American, 1.9% Asian, 0.2% Native American, and 3.0% other, with 2.4% identified as Hispanic of any race.

Of the 287,012 households, 29.6% had children under the age of 18 living with them, 45.2% were married couples living together, 14.7% had a female householder with no husband present, and 36.2% were not families. About 30.5% of all households were made up of individuals, and 10.3% had someone living alone who was 65 years of age or older. The average household size was 2.37 and the average family size was 2.97.

The age distribution is 24.3% under the age of 18, 8.9% from 18 to 24, 30.4% from 25 to 44, 22.8% from 45 to 64, and 13.5% who were 65 years of age or older. The median age was 37 years. For every 100 females, there were 91.60 males. For every 100 females age 18 and over, there were 87.60 males.

The median income for a household in 2017 was $51,960. For non-family households the median income was $32,446, and for family households was $67,965. In 2017, males had a median income of $36,326 while females had a median income of $30,464. The latest available data for per capita income comes from 2006, and was $23,304 for the county. About 9.5% of families and 15.1% of the population were below the poverty line in 2017, including 23.5% of those under age 18 and 8.2% of those ages 65 or over.

Additionally, around 60,000 Cuban Americans are said to live in the Louisville area, with Jefferson County ranking 12th nationally.

=== Religion ===
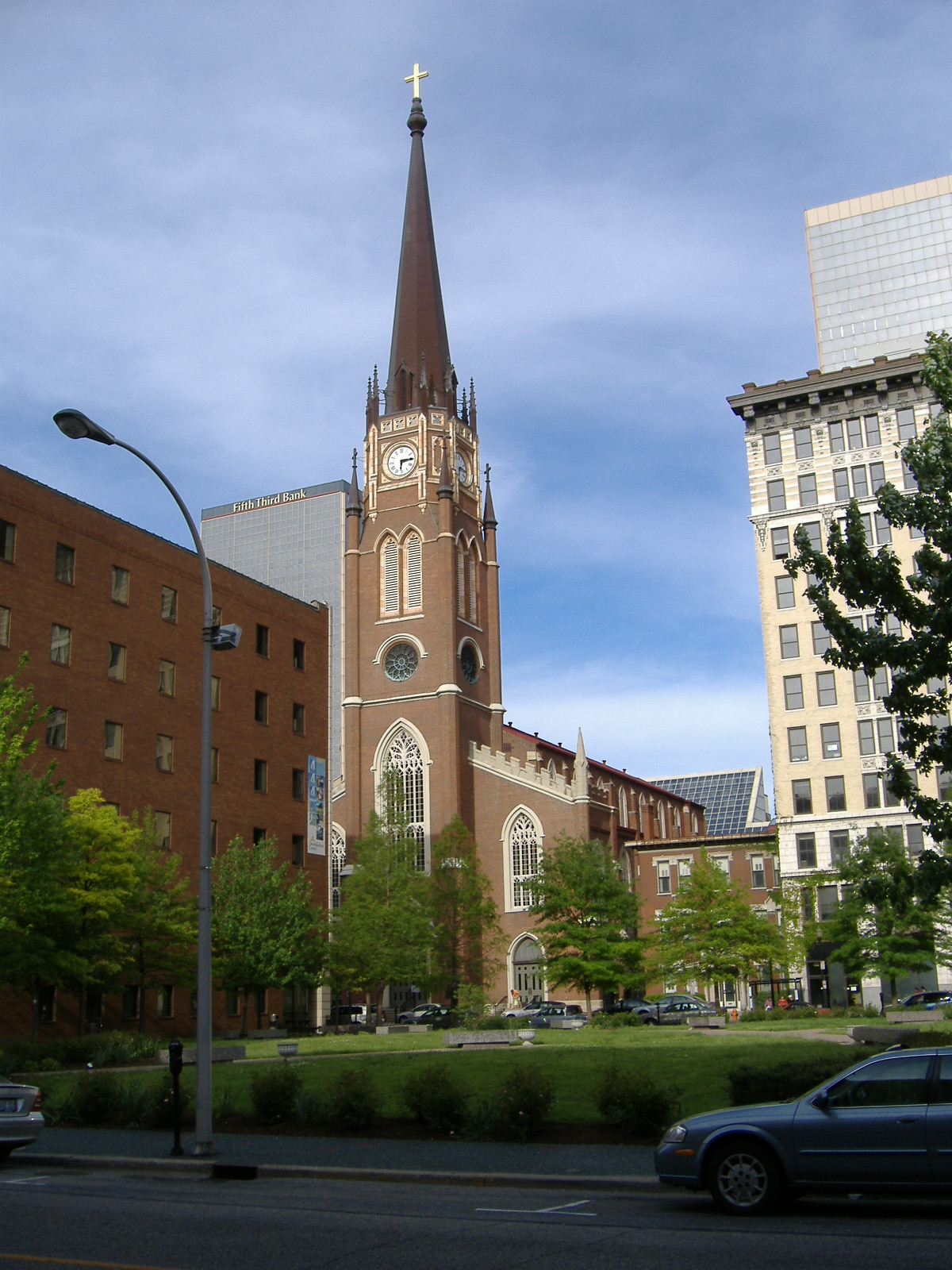
Cathedral of the Assumption

Louisville hosts religious institutions of various faiths, including Christianity, Judaism, Islam, Hinduism, Buddhism, Sikhism and the Baháʼí Faith.

One in three Louisvillians is Southern Baptist, belonging to one of 147 local congregations. This denomination was among the earliest churches in the city, remaining the most numerous today. Later, when large numbers of people moved into Louisville in the early 20th century from rural Kentucky and Tennessee to work in the city's factories; some of these migrants formed Holiness and Pentecostal churches and Churches of Christ that were typically more common in small towns and rural communities.

The largest Methodist Church in Kentucky, Christ Church United Methodist, is located in Louisville, and the city has boasted a large Methodist population since the cities founding.

The 135,421 Roman Catholic Louisvillians are part of the Archdiocese of Louisville, covering 24 counties in central Kentucky, and consisting of 121 parishes and missions spread over 8,124 square miles (21,040 km^{2}). The Cathedral of the Assumption in downtown Louisville is the seat of the Archdiocese of Louisville. Our Lady of Gethsemani Abbey, the monastic home of Catholic writer Thomas Merton, is in nearby Bardstown, Kentucky, and also in the archdiocese. Louisville's Catholic population descends from various waves of different migrants, ranging from Anglo-Catholics that migrated to western Kentucky from Maryland after the American Revolution, to Irish and German populations that immigrated in the mid-1800s.

Bellarmine University and Spalding University in Louisville are affiliated with the Roman Catholic Church.

German immigrants in the 19th century brought not only a large Catholic population, but also the Lutheran and Evangelical faiths, which are represented today in Louisville by the Evangelical Lutheran Church in America, the Lutheran Church–Missouri Synod, and the United Church of Christ, respectively.

The city is home to two megachurches. Southeast Christian Church, with its main campus in Middletown and three others in the surrounding region, is, as of 2023, the eighth-largest church in the US by average weekend attendance. St. Stephen Church has the largest African American congregation in Kentucky.

The city is home to several religious institutions: the Southern Baptist Theological Seminary, Louisville Bible College, Louisville Presbyterian Theological Seminary, and the denominational headquarters of the Presbyterian Church (USA).

The Church of Jesus Christ of Latter-day Saints maintains a temple in suburban Crestwood.

The Jewish population of around 18,300 in the metro area (as of 2022) is served by five synagogues. Most Jewish families emigrated from Eastern Europe at the start of the 20th century; around 800 Soviet Jews have moved to Louisville since 1991. Jewish immigrants founded Jewish Hospital in what was once the center of the city's Jewish district. From 2005 to 2012, Jewish Hospital merged with two Kentucky-based Catholic healthcare systems to form KentuckyOne Health, which later in 2012 announced a partnership with the University of Louisville Hospital. A significant focal point for Louisville's Jewish community is located near Bowman Field, where there are two Orthodox synagogues (including Anshei Sfard, founded in 1893), the Jewish Community Center, Jewish Family and Career Services, and an affordable housing complex.

Muslims in Louisville number around 10,000, both indigenous and immigrants who arrived in the early 1960s from India, Pakistan, Bangladesh, Iran, and Turkey. Immigrants from Afghanistan arrived in the early 1980s. Those from Iraq, Somalia, and Bosnia arrived in the 1990s, and the 2010s saw the arrival of immigrants from Kosovo. Many mosques and Islamic organizations exist in the metro area.

Since 1996, every May, the Festival of Faiths, a five-day national interfaith gathering, is held featuring music, poetry, film, art, and dialogue. The festival is organized by the Center for Interfaith Relations and is held at Actors Theatre of Louisville.

Today, roughly 48.7% of the religious Christian population belong to Evangelical Protestant churches ranging from Baptist to Pentecostal Methodist, while roughly 24.2% belong to Mainline Protestant churches. Similarly, around 20.4% claim Catholicism.

Louisville first welcomed the Baháʼí Faith in 1920. The Spiritual Assembly of the Baháʼí of Louisville was formed in 1944 when their community reached the required amount of nine adult Baháʼís. The first Baháʼí center opened in Louisville in 1967 in Crescent Hill. When the community outgrew the space in 1985, it was sold and another center opened in Buechel in 1998.

The Hindu population has a temple, which opened in Fincastle in suburban Louisville in 1999, and had about 125 members and two full-time priests in 2000. The temple was renovated and rededicated in the summer of 2011.

=== Crime ===
In a 2005 survey, Morgan Quitno Press ranked Louisville as the seventh safest large city in the United States. The 2006 edition of the survey ranked Louisville eighth.

In 2004, Louisville recorded 70 murders. The numbers for 2005 ranged from 55 to 59 (FBI says 55, LMPD says 59), which was down 16 percent from 2004. In 2006, Louisville-Jefferson County recorded 50 murders, which was significantly lower than previous years. In 2008, Louisville recorded 79 murders.

The Louisville Metro Area's overall violent crime rate was 412.6 per 100,000 residents in 2005. The Elizabethtown, Kentucky Metro Area, which is part of Louisville's Combined Statistical Area, was the 17th safest Metro in the U.S. Kentucky has the 5th lowest violent crime rate out of the 50 states.

In 2020, Louisville recorded 173 murders; and, in 2021, Louisville recorded 188 murders amidst an ongoing violent crime wave in the city.

The city has also been one of the hardest hit by the opioid epidemic. In 2021, Louisville broke the record for overdoses in the city. Heroin, fentanyl and other opioids have also attributed to an overall increase in violent crime, property crime and homelessness in the past decade.

Violent crime is most concentrated west of downtown, especially in the Russell neighborhood. The West End, located north of Algonquin Parkway and West of 9th Street, had 32 of the city's 79 murders in 2007.

== Economy ==
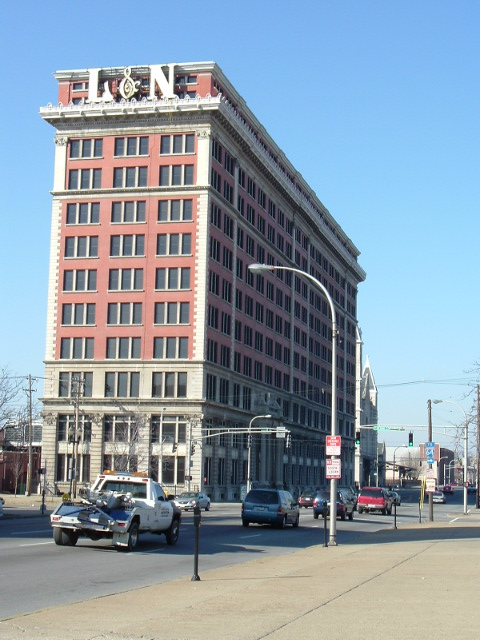
L&N Building on West Broadway

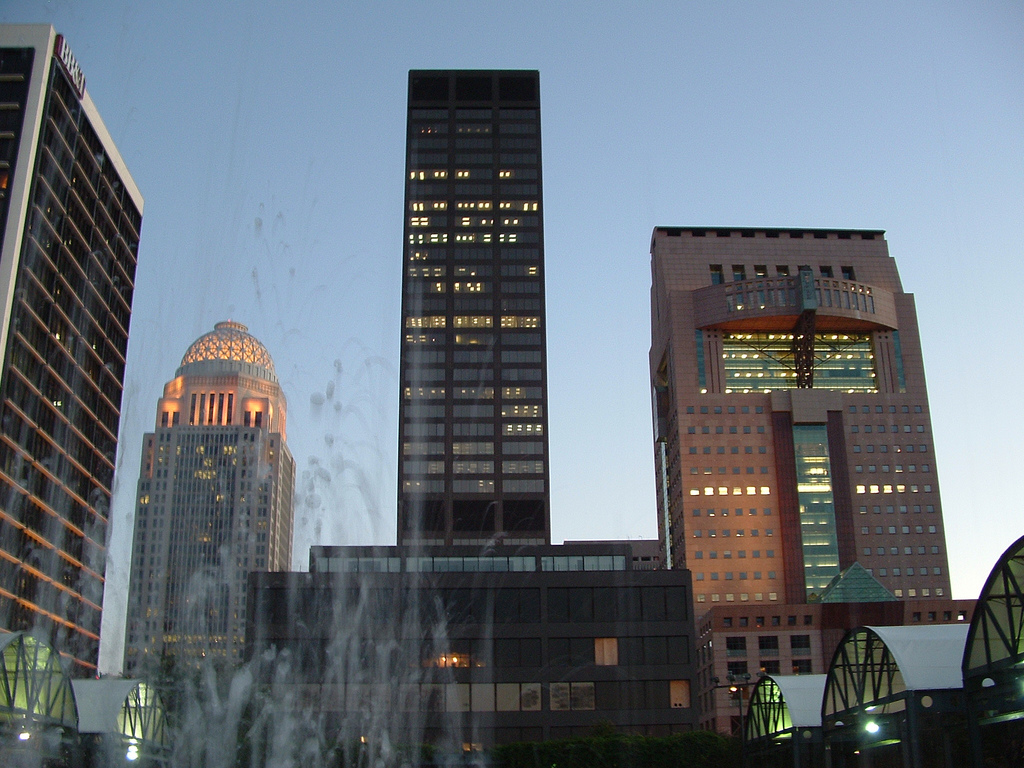
Left to right, BB&T Building, 400 West Market, PNC Tower, and the Humana Building in downtown Louisville

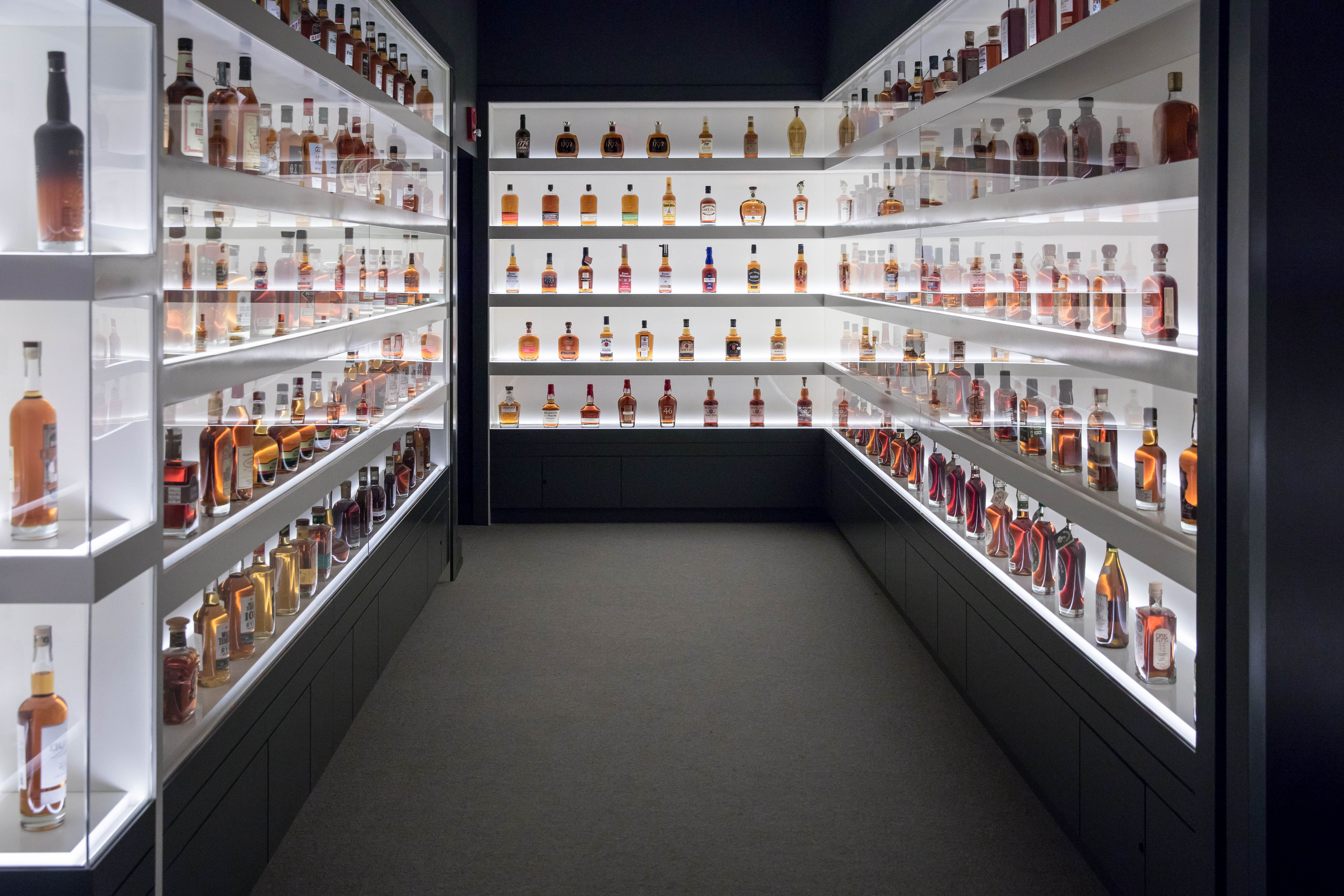
Bottle Hall at the Frazier History Museum, showcasing every bourbon being produced in Kentucky

Louisville today is home to dozens of companies and organizations across several industrial classifications. However, the underpinning of the city's economy since its earliest days has been the shipping and cargo industries. Its strategic location at the Falls of the Ohio, as well as its unique position in the central United States (within one day's road travel to 60 percent of the cities in the continental U.S.) make it a practical location for the transfer of cargo along its route to other destinations. The Louisville and Portland Canal and the Louisville and Nashville Railroad were important links in water and rail transportation.

Louisville's importance to the shipping industry continues today with the presence of the Worldport global air-freight hub for UPS at Louisville International Airport. Louisville's location at the crossroads of three major interstate highways (I‑64, I‑65, and I‑71) also contributes to its modern-day strategic importance to the shipping and cargo industry. In addition, the Port of Louisville continues Louisville's river shipping presence at Jefferson Riverport International. As of 2003, Louisville ranks as the seventh-largest inland port in the United States.

Louisville is a significant center of manufacturing, with two major Ford Motor Company plants, and the headquarters and major home appliance factory of GE Appliances (a subsidiary of Haier). The city is also a major center of the American whiskey industry, with about one-third of all bourbon whiskey coming from Louisville. Brown-Forman, one of the major makers of American whiskey, is headquartered in Louisville and operates a distillery in the Louisville suburb of Shively. The current primary distillery site operated by Heaven Hill, called the Bernheim distillery, is also located in Louisville near Brown-Forman's distillery. Other distilleries and related businesses can also be found in neighboring cities in Kentucky, such as Bardstown, Clermont, Lawrenceburg, and Loretto. Similar to the Kentucky Bourbon Trail that links these central Kentucky locations, Louisville offers tourists its own "Urban Bourbon Trail", where people can stop at nearly 20 "area bars and restaurants, all offering at least 50 labels of America's only native spirit".

While the city is not typically known for high tech outside of the previously identified industries, Code Louisville, its public–private partnership for teaching people entry level software development skills, received recognition in 2015 from then-President Barack Obama.

Omega Mirror Products, which at the height of the disco era in the 1970s manufactured 90% of all mirror balls in the US, is based in Louisville.

Several major motion pictures have been filmed in or near Louisville, including The Insider, Goldfinger, Stripes, Lawn Dogs, Elizabethtown, and Secretariat.

=== Top employers ===
As of the city's 2023 Annual Comprehensive Financial Report, Louisville's top employers are:

#	Employer	Number of Employees
1	United Parcel Service	26,328
2	Norton Healthcare	15,044
3	Jefferson County Public Schools	14,000
4	UofL Health	13,136
5	Ford Motor Company	13,020
6	Baptist Health	8,657
7	Walmart	8,550
8	GE Appliances	8,500
9	Humana Inc.	7,465
10	University of Louisville	7,114

== Arts and culture ==
=== Annual festivals and other events ===
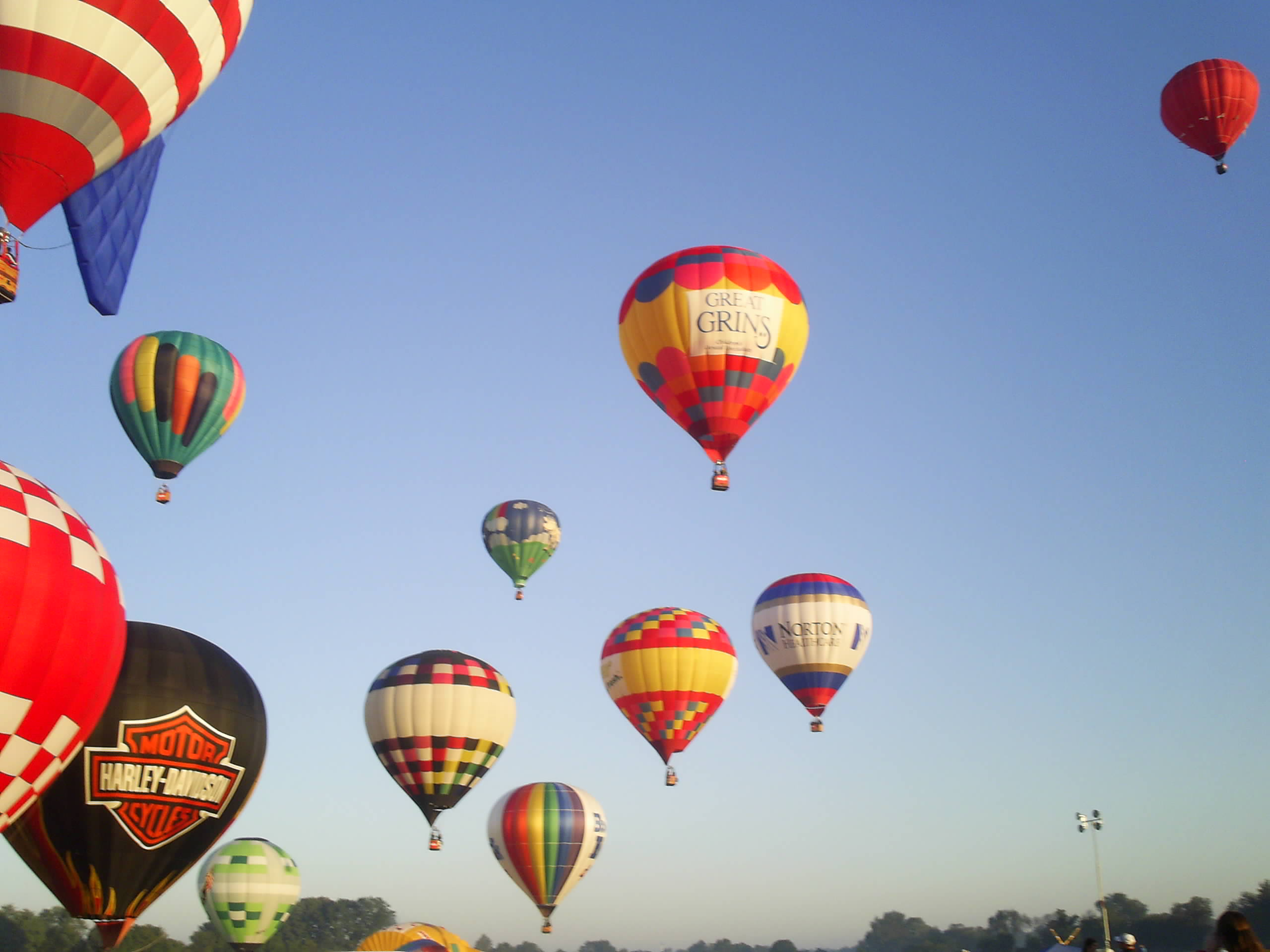
The Great Balloon Race, part of the Kentucky Derby Festival

Louisville is home to many annual cultural events. Perhaps most well known is the Kentucky Derby, held annually during the first Saturday of May. The Derby is preceded by a two-week-long Kentucky Derby Festival, which starts with the annual Thunder Over Louisville, the largest annual fireworks display in North America. The Kentucky Derby Festival also features notable events such as the Pegasus Parade, The Great Steamboat Race, Great Balloon Race, a combined marathon/mini marathon and about seventy events in total. Esquire magazine has called the Kentucky Derby "the biggest party in the south".

The summer season in Louisville also features a series of cultural events such as the Kentucky Shakespeare Festival (commonly called "Shakespeare in Central Park"), held every summer from May to August and presents free Shakespeare plays in Central Park in Old Louisville.

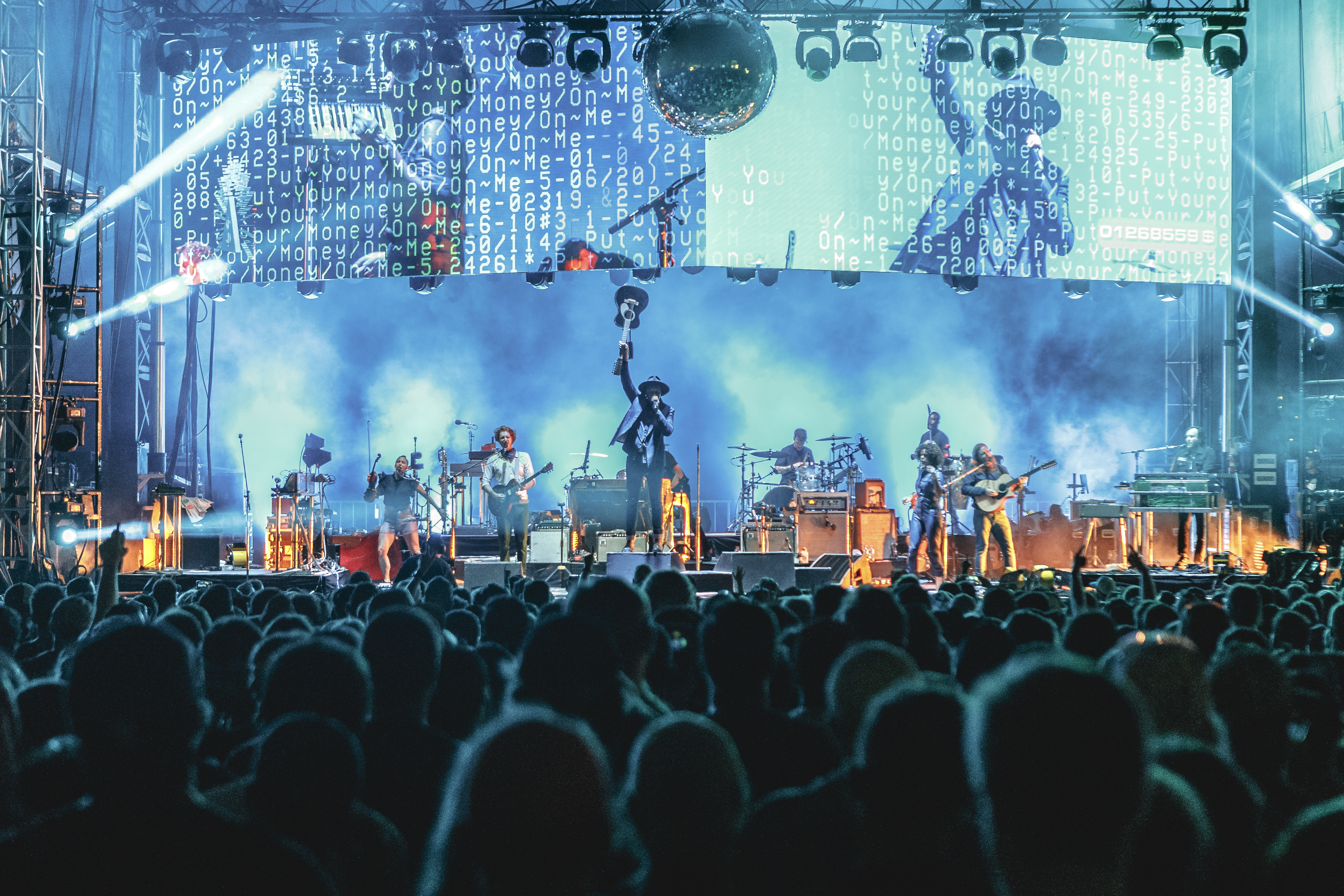
Arcade Fire appearing at the Forecastle Festival in 2018

Before pausing in 2023, the Forecastle Festival during Memorial Day weekend drew 75,000 visitors (as of 2022) to Louisville Waterfront Park in celebration of the best in music, art and environmental activism. Past performers include The Black Keys, The Flaming Lips, Widespread Panic, The Smashing Pumpkins, The Avett Brothers, The Black Crowes and hundreds more. It was replaced in 2024 with the Gazebo Festival, co-headlined by Louisville's Jack Harlow and SZA.

The Kentucky State Fair is held every August at the Kentucky Exposition Center in Louisville as well, featuring an array of culture from all areas of Kentucky. In places, the African American community celebrates Juneteenth commemorating June 19, 1865, when enslaved African Americans in the western territories learned of their freedom.

The Jeffersontown neighborhood is also the home of the annual Gaslight Festival, a series of events spread over a week. Attendance is estimated at 200,000–300,000 for the week.

The month of October features the St. James Court Art Show in Old Louisville. Thousands of artists gather on the streets and in the courtyard to exhibit and sell their wares, and the event is attended by many art collectors and enthusiasts. The show typically brings in a crowd of over 150,000 people and $3 million in sales.

Another art-related event that occurs every month is the First Friday Hop.

=== Indie scene ===
A Louisville locale that highlights the city's indie scene is Bardstown Road, an area located in the heart of the Highlands. Bardstown Road is known for its cultural diversity and local trade. Though it is only about a mile (1.6 km) long, this strip of Bardstown Road constitutes much of the city's culture and diverse lifestyle, contributing to the unofficial "Keep Louisville Weird" slogan.

In downtown Louisville, 21c Museum Hotel, a hotel that showcases contemporary art installations and exhibitions throughout its public spaces, and features a red penguin on its roof, is, according to The New York Times, "an innovative concept with strong execution and prompt and enthusiastic service".

Louisville is home to a thriving indie music scene with bands such as Love Jones, Tantric, Squirrel Bait, CABIN, Slint, My Morning Jacket, Houndmouth, Young Widows and Wax Fang. Acclaimed singer-songwriters Will Oldham, who performs under the moniker "Bonnie 'Prince' Billy", is a resident, as was country/rock singer-songwriter Tim Krekel. Cellist Ben Sollee splits his time between Louisville and Lexington. Long running rock/jazz fusion band NRBQ also formed in Louisville in the late 1960s as well as 1980s psychobilly band Bodeco. Post-grunge band Days of the New, at one time including Nicole Scherzinger, formed in Louisville in the mid-1990s. Popular local singer Bryson Tiller paid homage to Louisville in his chart-topping T R A P S O U L with the song "502 Come Up", referencing the city's area code, and rapper Jack Harlow also calls the city home.

Especially catering to Louisville's music scene is 91.9 WFPK Radio Louisville, a local public radio station funded, in part, from local listeners.

=== Museums, galleries and interpretive centers ===
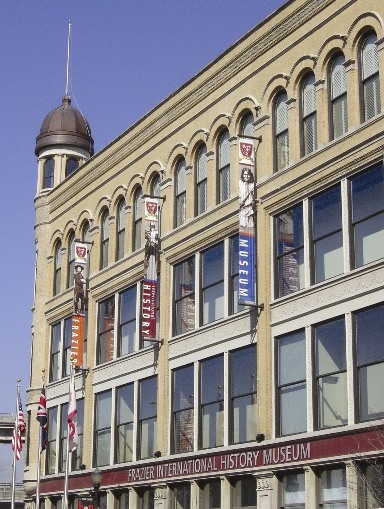
Facade of the Frazier History Museum

The West Main District in downtown Louisville features what is locally known as "Museum Row". In this area is the Frazier History Museum, which opened in 2004 as an armaments museum but since has expanded its focus. It originally featured the only collection of Royal Armouries artifacts outside of the United Kingdom until remaining display items were returned in 2015.

Also nearby is the Kentucky Science Center, which is Kentucky's largest hands-on science center and features interactive exhibits, IMAX films, educational programs and technology networks. The Kentucky Museum of Art and Craft, opened in 1981, is a nonprofit organization. The Muhammad Ali Center opened November 2005 in "Museum Row" and features Louisville native Muhammad Ali's boxing memorabilia.

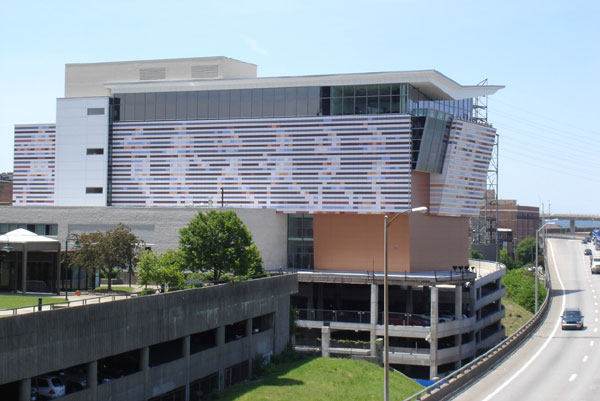
Muhammad Ali Center, alongside I‑64 on Louisville's riverfront

The National Society of the Sons of the American Revolution (SAR) is a patriotic, historical, and educational non-profit organization and a leading male lineage society that perpetuates the ideals of the American war for independence and the founding of the United States. The SAR opened its National Genealogical Research Library in 2010.

The Speed Art Museum opened in 1927 and is the oldest and largest art museum in Kentucky. The museum was closed for three years, re-opening in 2016 with 220,000 sq. ft. of renovations. Located adjacent to the University of Louisville, the museum features over 12,000 pieces of art in its permanent collection and hosts traveling exhibitions. Multiple art galleries are located in the city, but they are especially concentrated in the East Market District (NuLu), immediately to the east of downtown. This row of galleries, plus others in the West Main District, are prominently featured in the monthly First Friday Hop.

Several local history museums are in the Louisville area. The most prominent among them is The Filson Historical Society, founded in 1884, which has holdings of over 1.5 million manuscript items and over 50,000 volumes in the library. The Filson's extensive collections focus on Kentucky, the Upper South and the Ohio River Valley, and contain a large collection of portraiture and over 10,000 museum artifacts. Other local history museums include the Portland Museum, Historic Locust Grove, Conrad-Caldwell House Museum, the Falls of the Ohio State Park interpretive center (Clarksville, Indiana), Howard Steamboat Museum (Jeffersonville, Indiana) and the Carnegie Center for Art and History (New Albany, Indiana). The Falls interpretive center, part of the Falls of the Ohio National Wildlife Conservation Area, also functions as a natural history museum, covering findings in the nearby exposed Devonian fossil bed.

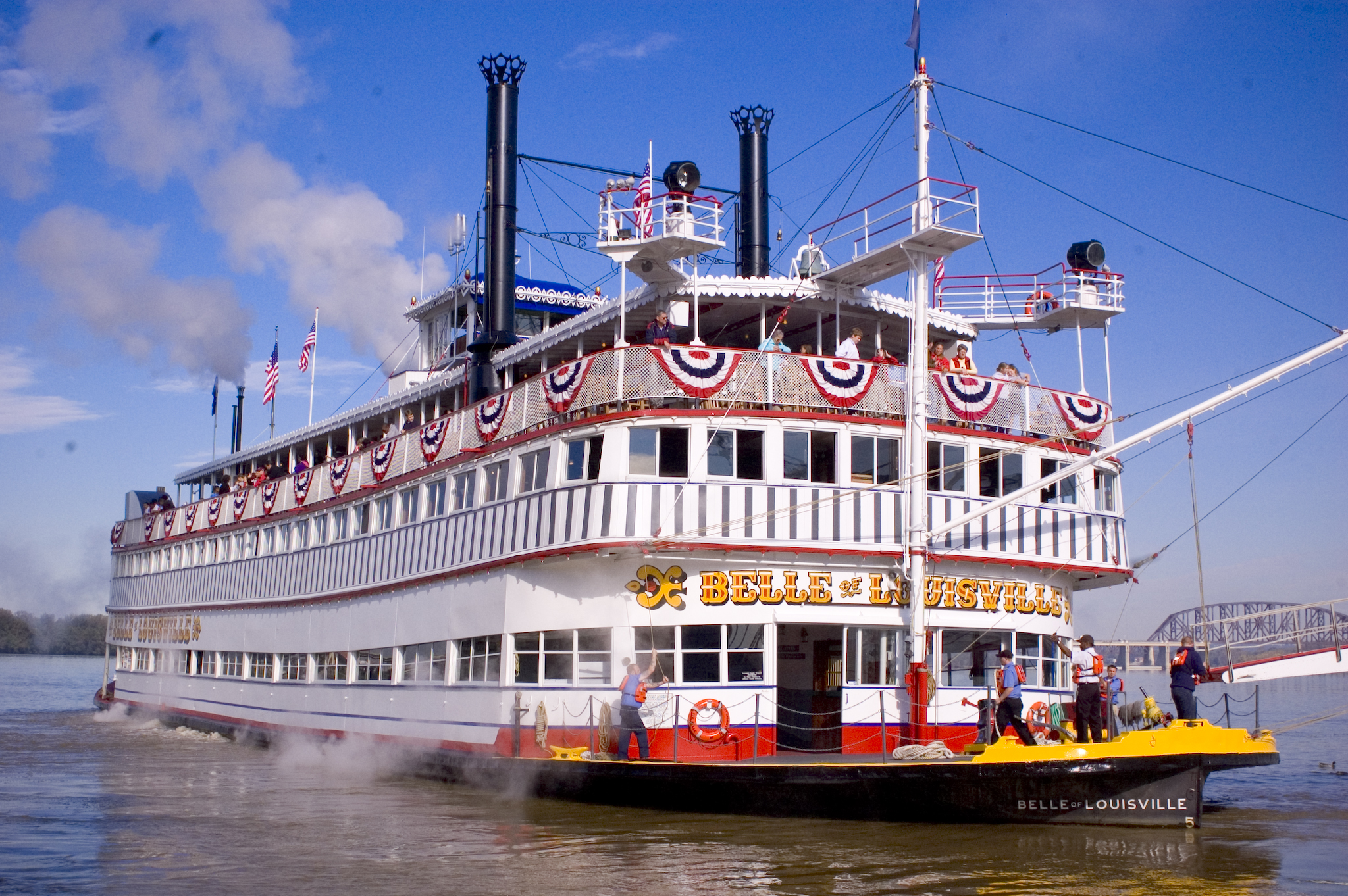
The Belle of Louisville

There are also several historical properties and items of interest in the area, including the Belle of Louisville, the oldest Mississippi-style steamboat in operation in the United States. The United States Marine Hospital of Louisville is considered by the National Park Service to be the best remaining antebellum hospital in the United States. It was designed by Robert Mills, who is best known as the designer of the Washington Monument. Fort Knox, spread out among Bullitt, Hardin and Meade Counties (two of which are in the Louisville metropolitan area), is home to the U.S. Bullion Depository and the General George Patton Museum. The previously mentioned Locust Grove, former home of Louisville Founder George Rogers Clark, portrays life in the early days of the city. Other notable properties include the Farmington Historic Plantation (home of the Speed family), Riverside, The Farnsley-Moremen Landing and the restored Union Station, which opened in 1891. The Louisville area is also home to the Waverly Hills Sanatorium, a turn-of-the-century (20th) hospital that was originally built to accommodate tuberculosis patients, and subsequently has been reported and sensationalized to be haunted. The Little Loomhouse maintains historical records of local spinning and weaving patterns and techniques.

=== Performing arts ===
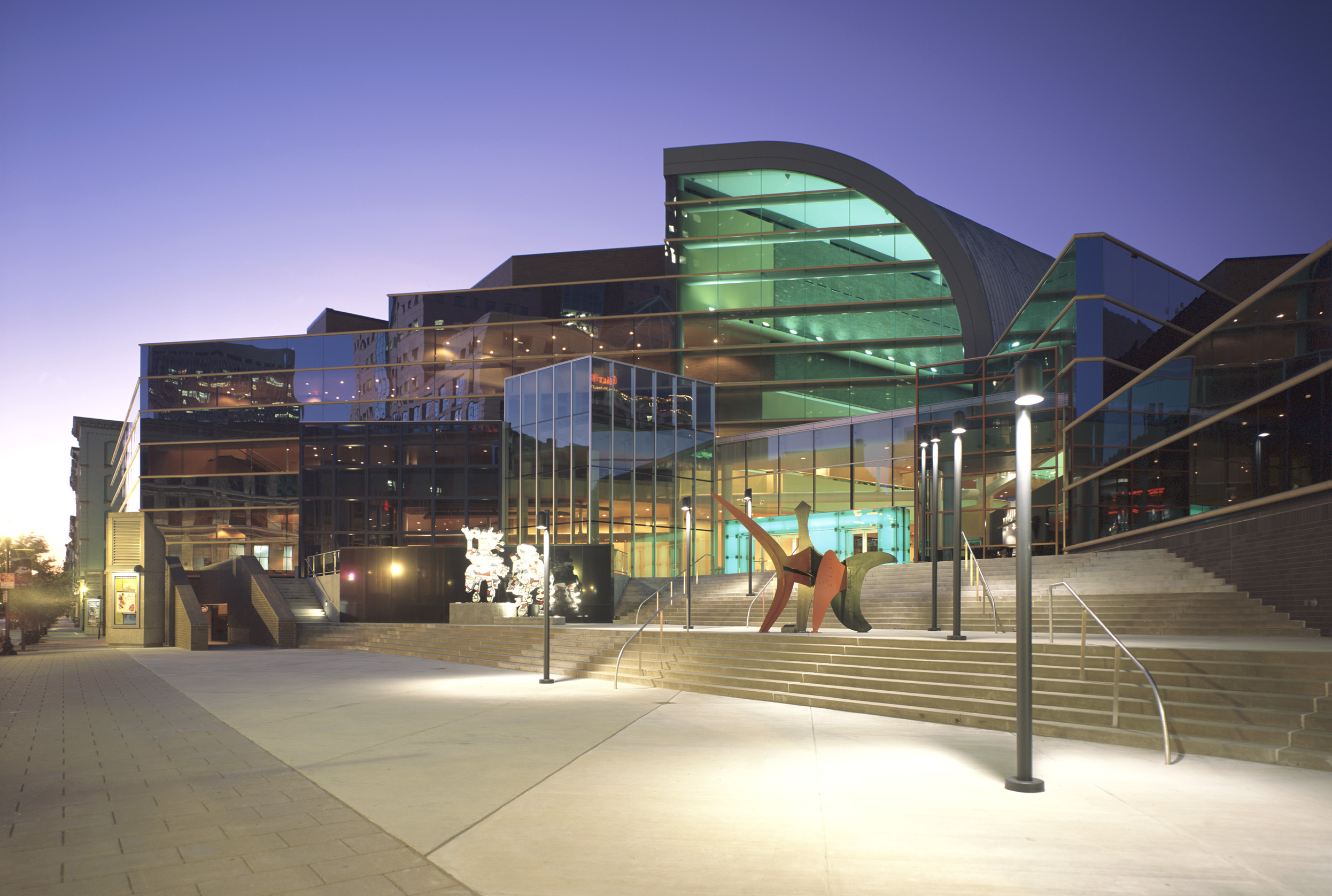
The Kentucky Center in Downtown Louisville

The Kentucky Center, dedicated in 1983, located in the downtown hotel and entertainment district, features a variety of plays and concerts. This is also the home of the Louisville Ballet, Louisville Orchestra, Bourbon Baroque, Actors Theatre of Louisville, StageOne Family Theatre, Kentucky Shakespeare Festival, which operates the oldest professional outdoor Shakespeare festival, and the Kentucky Opera, which is the twelfth oldest opera in the United States.

Actors Theatre of Louisville presents approximately 600 performances of about 30 productions annually. From 1976 to 2021, it hosted the Humana Festival of New American Plays, a month-long festival of plays in the spring; the last festival took place virtually due to the COVID-19 pandemic. The event was discontinued after the festival's chief sponsor, the Humana Foundation, refocused its philanthropic endeavors to support health-based initiatives.

The Louisville Orchestra was founded in 1937 by conductor Robert Whitney. The orchestra today performs more than 125 concerts per year. The orchestra won the 2024 Grammy Award for "Best Classical Instrumental Solo".

The Palace Theatre is an ornate theatre in downtown Louisville's theatre district which shows films and hosts concerts.

Iroquois Park is the home of the renovated Iroquois Amphitheater, which hosts a variety of musical concerts in a partially covered outdoor setting.

== Sports ==
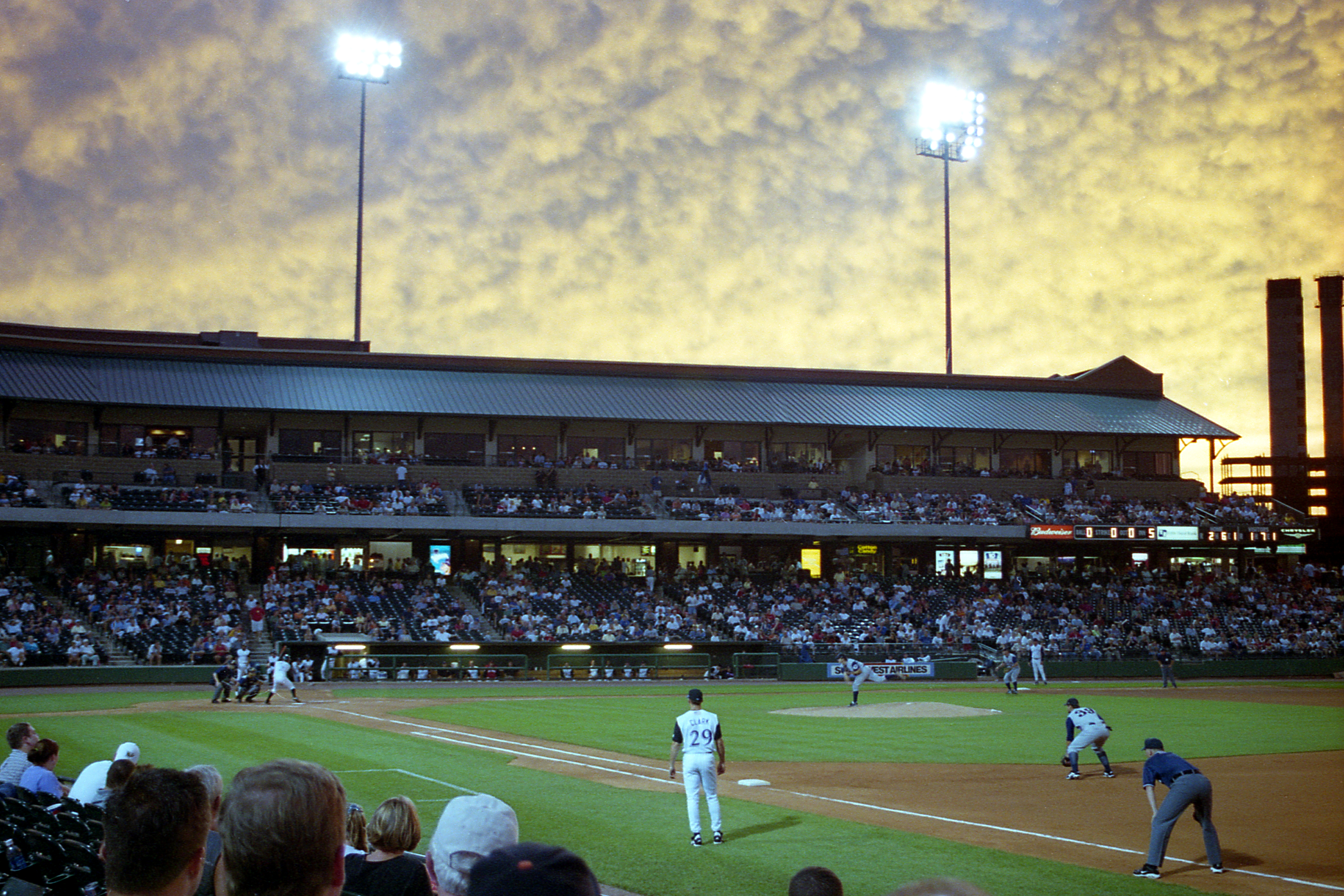
Louisville Slugger Field, where the Louisville Bats play

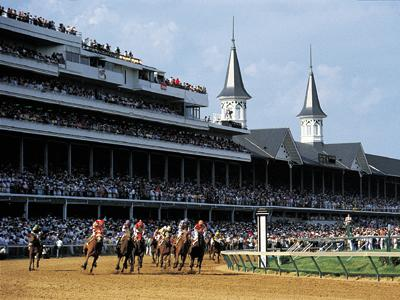
Kentucky Derby at Churchill Downs

College sports are popular in the Louisville area. The Louisville Cardinals have competed as members of the Atlantic Coast Conference (ACC), since joining that league in July 2014.

College basketball is particularly popular. The Louisville Cardinals's Freedom Hall averaged sellouts for 10 straight years and the Downtown KFC Yum! Center following suit with regular sellouts. The Cardinals ranked third nationally in attendance in 2012–13, the most recent of the program's three (Note: NCAA vacated Louisville Cardinals men's basketball's 2013 championship title, their third, due to the 2015 University of Louisville basketball sex scandal.) national championship seasons (1980, 1986, 2013). The Cardinals also hold the Big East conference women's basketball paid attendance record with nearly 17,000 attending the game against the Kentucky Wildcats in 2008. The Louisville market has ranked first in ratings for the NCAA men's basketball tournament every year since 1999. The Kentucky Wildcats used to play an annual game in Freedom Hall.

The Louisville Cardinals football team has produced successful NFL players such as Lamar Jackson, Johnny Unitas, Deion Branch, Teddy Bridgewater, Sam Madison, David Akers, Joe Jacoby, DeVante Parker and Ray Buchanan. The Cardinals won the 1991 Fiesta Bowl, the 2007 Orange Bowl, and the 2013 Sugar Bowl. In 2016, sophomore quarterback Lamar Jackson took the football team to new heights. Lamar was the school's first Heisman Trophy winner, which is awarded to the most outstanding college football player nationwide during that season. He was also one of the youngest players to ever receive the award. The team also matched their highest ranking in school history at No. 3. The University of Louisville baseball team advanced to the College World Series in Omaha in 2007, 2013, 2014, 2017 and 2019 as one of the final eight teams to compete for the national championship.

Horse racing is also a major attraction. Churchill Downs is home to the Kentucky Derby, the largest sporting event in the state, as well as the Kentucky Oaks which together cap the two-week-long Kentucky Derby Festival. Churchill Downs has also hosted the renowned Breeders' Cup on eight occasions, most recently in 2011.

Louisville is also the home of Valhalla Golf Club, which hosted the 1996, 2000, 2014, and 2024 PGA Championships, the 2004 Senior PGA Championship and the 2008 Ryder Cup.

Louisville has seven professional and semi-professional sports teams. The Louisville Bats are a baseball team playing in the International League as the Triple-A affiliate of the nearby Cincinnati Reds. The team plays at Louisville Slugger Field in downtown.

Louisville City FC, a professional soccer team in the second-division USL Championship, began play in 2015 at Slugger Field and has since moved into their own soccer-specific stadium, Lynn Family Stadium, in 2020. The team was originally the reserve side for Orlando City SC of Major League Soccer, but the two organizations were separated in 2016. Racing Louisville FC, an expansion team in the National Women's Soccer League began play in 2021 at Lynn Family Stadium.

Louisville had two professional American football teams in the National Football League: the Louisville Breckenridges (or Brecks for short) from 1921 to 1924 and the Louisville Colonels in 1926.

Between 1967 and 1976, Louisville was home to the Kentucky Colonels of the American Basketball Association. The Colonels was one of the ABA's most successful teams during its existence, winning four division titles and the 1975 ABA Championship, but was not invited to join the NBA when the two leagues merged in 1976, and subsequently folded.

Louisville has the added distinction of being the only city in the world that is the birthplace of four heavyweight boxing champions: Marvin Hart, Muhammad Ali, Jimmy Ellis and Greg Page.

In October 2025, the United Football League announced expansion to Louisville among other cities, with the Louisville Kings beginning play in 2026. The Kings won the 2026 United Bowl by a score of 27–20 to achieve their first title. The Kings became the first team in league history to win a title in its inaugural season.

=== Professional teams ===
Club	Sport	Began play	League	Venue	Titles
Louisville Bats	Baseball	2002	Minor League Baseball	Louisville Slugger Field	4
Louisville City FC	Men's soccer	2015	United Soccer League	Lynn Family Stadium	2
Racing Louisville FC	Women's soccer	2021	National Women's Soccer League	Lynn Family Stadium	0
Louisville Kings	Football	2026	United Football League	Lynn Family Stadium	1

== Parks and recreation ==
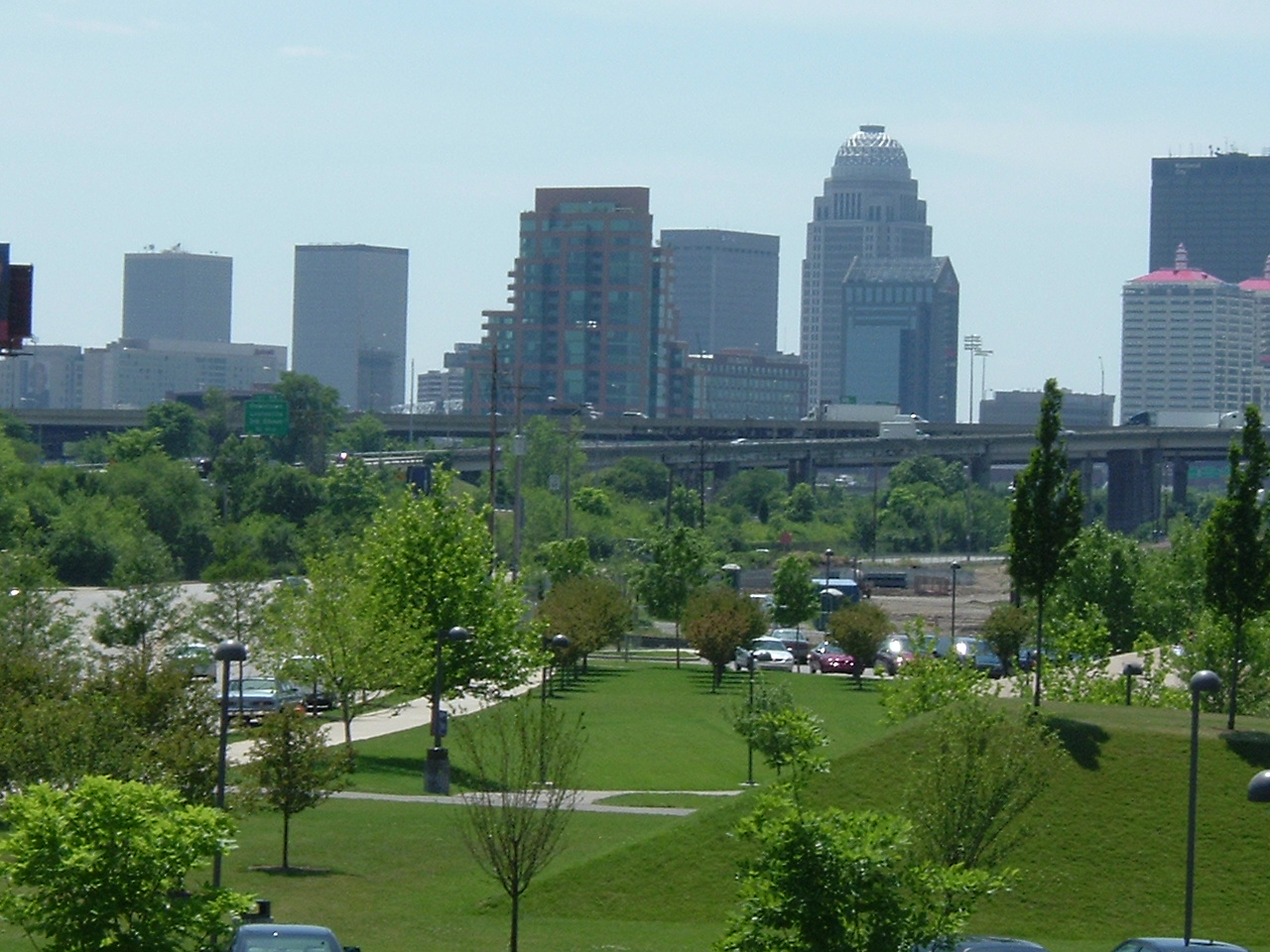
Louisville Waterfront Park exhibits rolling hills, spacious lawns and walking paths in the downtown area.

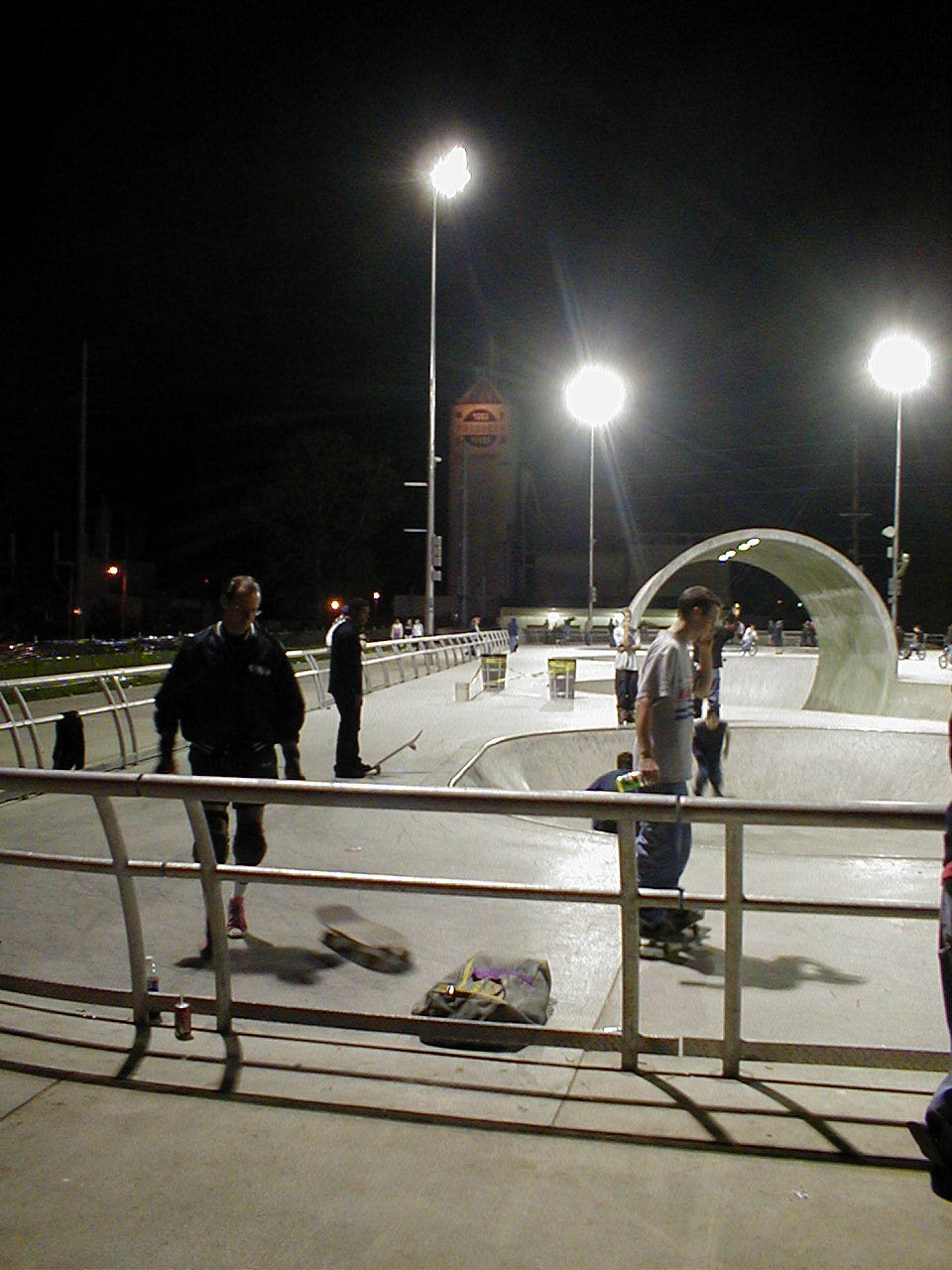
David Armstrong Extreme Park

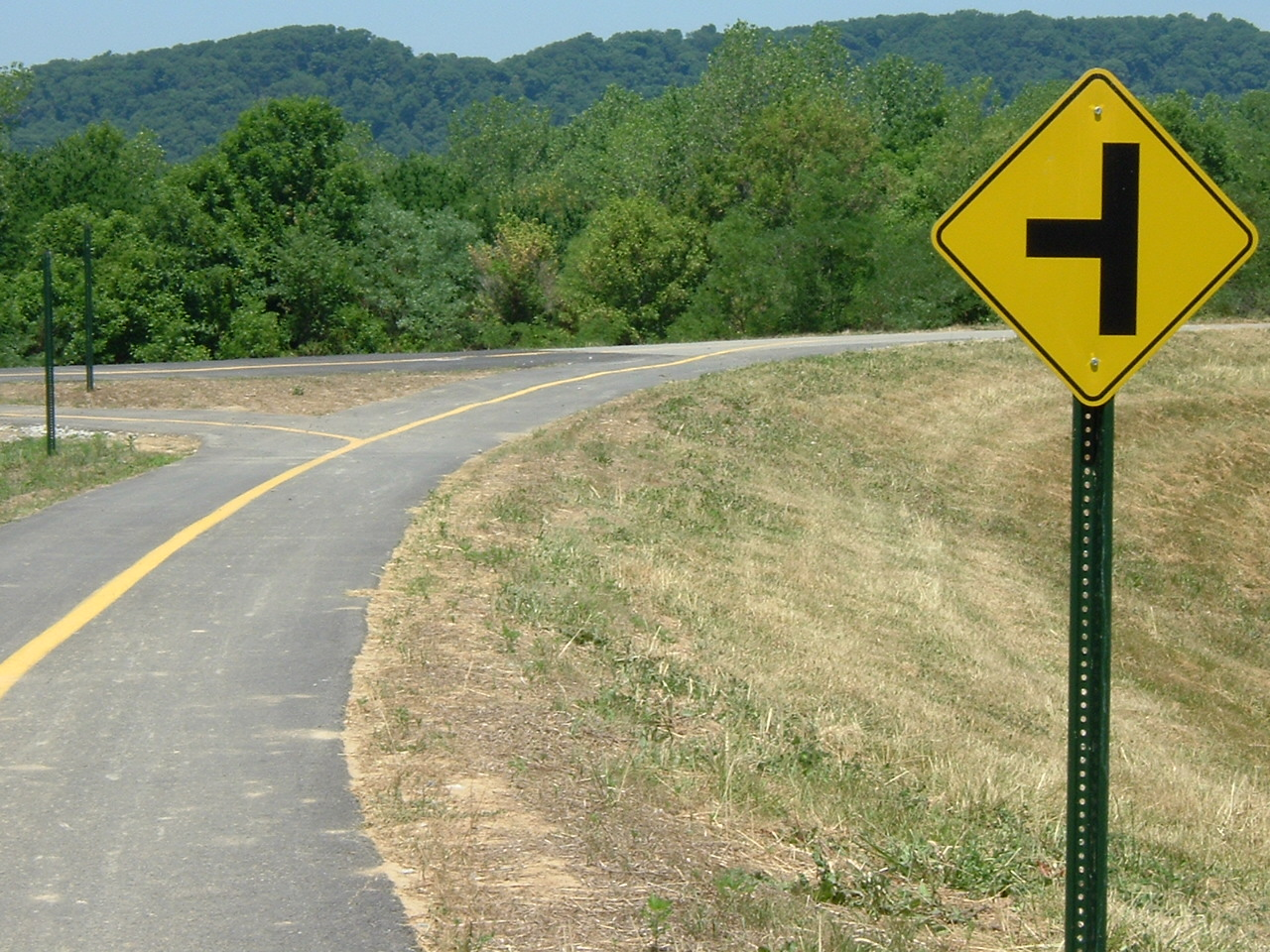
Louisville Loop bike and pedestrian trail

Louisville Metro has 122 city parks covering more than 13,000 acres (53 km^{2}). Several of these parks were designed by Frederick Law Olmsted, who also designed New York City's Central Park as well as parks, parkways, college campuses and public facilities in many U.S. locations. The Louisville Waterfront Park is prominently located on the banks of the Ohio River near downtown and features large open areas, which often hold free concerts and other festivals. The Big Four Bridge, a former railroad bridge spanning 547 feet (167 m) but is now a pedestrian bridge connecting Waterfront Park with Jeffersonville, Indiana's waterfront park, fully opened in May 2014 with the completion of Jeffersonville's ramp. Cherokee Park, one of the most visited parks in the nation, features a 2.6-mile (4.2 km) mixed-use loop and many well-known landscaping and architectural features. Other notable parks in the system include Iroquois Park, Shawnee Park, Seneca Park and Central Park.

Louisville is also home to David Armstrong Extreme Park (formerly Louisville Extreme Park), which skateboarder Tony Hawk has called one of his top five skate parks.

Further from the downtown area is the Jefferson Memorial Forest, which at 6,676 acres (27.02 km^{2}) is one of the largest municipal urban forests in the US. The forest is designated as a National Audubon Society wildlife refuge and offers nearly 60 miles (97 km) of hiking and equestrian trails.

Otter Creek Outdoor Recreation Area, owned and operated by the Kentucky Department of Fish and Wildlife Resources, is another large park in nearby Brandenburg, Kentucky. The park's namesake, Otter Creek, winds along the eastern side of the park. A scenic bend in the Ohio River, which divides Kentucky from Indiana, can be seen from northern overlooks within the park.

Other outdoor points of interest in the Louisville area include Cave Hill Cemetery (the burial location of Col. Harland Sanders), Zachary Taylor National Cemetery (the burial location of President Zachary Taylor), the Louisville Zoo and the Falls of the Ohio National Wildlife Conservation Area.

In development is the City of Parks, a project to create a 110-mile (180 km) continuous paved pedestrian and biking trail called the Louisville Loop around Louisville Metro while also adding a large amount of park land. Current plans call for making approximately 4,000 acres (16 km^{2}) of the Floyds Fork flood plain in eastern Jefferson County into a new park system called The Parklands of Floyds Fork, expanding area in the Jefferson Memorial Forest, and adding riverfront land and wharfs along the Riverwalk and the Levee Trail, both completed segments of the Louisville Loop.

== Government ==
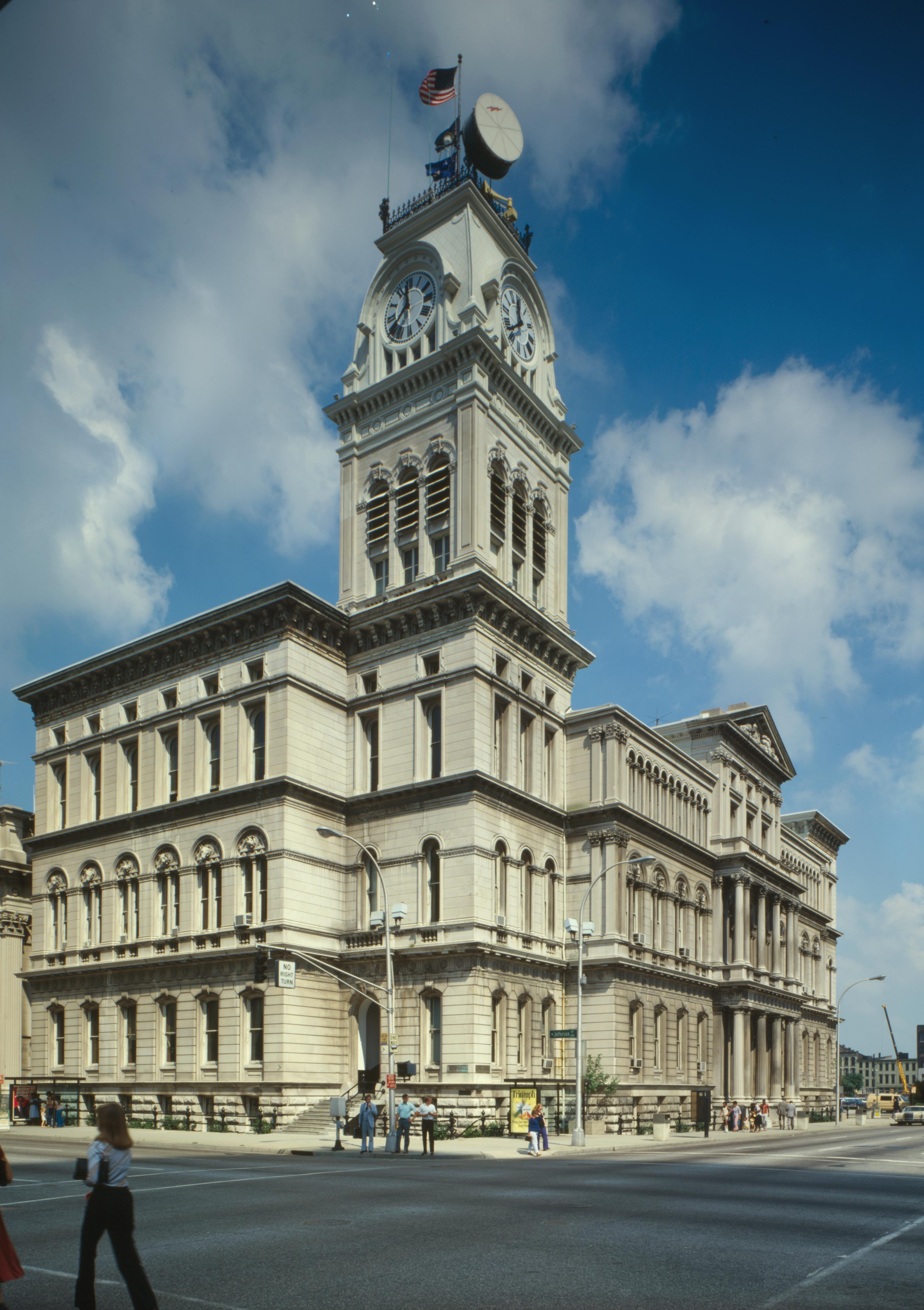
Louisville City Hall in downtown, built 1870–1873, is a blend of Italianate styles characteristic of Neo-Renaissance.

On January 6, 2003, the City of Louisville and Jefferson County merged their governments, forming coterminous borders. Louisville was the second city in the state to merge with its county; Lexington and Fayette County had previously merged in 1974.

The combined government is officially the Louisville/Jefferson County Metro Government, referred to as Louisville Metro. It is governed by an executive called the Metro Mayor and a city legislature called the Metro Council. The third and current Metro Mayor is Craig Greenberg (D), who entered office on January 3, 2023.

While Louisville Metro governs the entire county, smaller cities outside of the pre-merger City of Louisville continue to exist. These smaller cities have limited powers of governance as granted by the Kentucky legislature. Residents of those smaller cities vote both for the offices of their city and for Louisville Metro offices by virtue of being residents of Jefferson County.

Before merger, under the Kentucky Constitution and statutory law Louisville was designated as a first-class city in regard to local laws affecting public safety, alcohol beverage control, revenue options, and various other matters. After merging, Louisville has continued to be a first-class city and is the only such city in Kentucky.

The Official Seal of the City of Louisville, no longer used following the merger, reflected its history and heritage in the fleur-de-lis representing French aid given during the Revolutionary War and the thirteen stars signifying the original colonies. The new Seal of Louisville Metro retains the fleur-de-lis, but has only two stars, one representing the city and the other the county.

Kentucky's 3rd congressional district encompasses most of Louisville Metro, and is represented by Rep. Morgan McGarvey (D). Far eastern portions of the county are part of the 2nd congressional district, which is represented by Brett Guthrie (R).

== Education ==
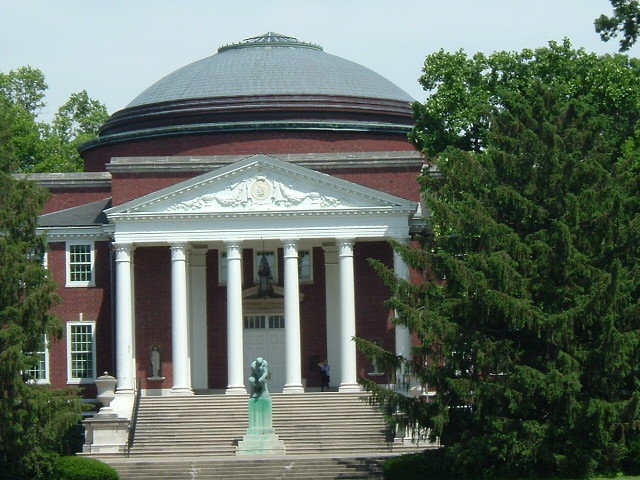
Grawemeyer Hall, modeled after the Roman Pantheon, is the University of Louisville's main administrative building.

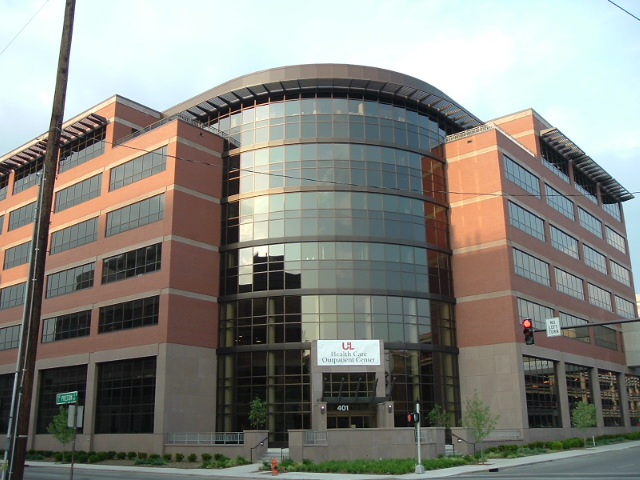
Medical Office Plaza on the University of Louisville's downtown Health Sciences Campus

=== Primary and secondary education ===
The public school system, Jefferson County Public Schools, consists of more than 100,000 students in 173 schools. Dupont Manual High School ranks 30th in the nation overall for best high schools, and 13th in best magnet high schools. Due to Louisville's large Catholic population, there are 27 Catholic schools in the city. The Kentucky School for the Blind, for all of Kentucky's blind and visually impaired students, is located on Frankfort Avenue in the Clifton neighborhood.

=== Higher education ===
Louisville is home to several institutions of higher learning. There are six four-year universities, the University of Louisville (UofL), Bellarmine University, Boyce College, Spalding University, Sullivan University and Simmons College of Kentucky; Louisville Bible College; a two-year community college, Jefferson Community and Technical College; and several other business or technical schools such as Spencerian College, Strayer University and Sullivan College of Technology and Design. Indiana University Southeast (IUS) and Purdue Polytechnic New Albany are located across the Ohio River in New Albany, Indiana, along with the Sellersburg campus of Ivy Tech Community College in nearby Sellersburg, Indiana.

Eight Institutions – UofL, Bellarmine, Ivy Tech, IUS, Jefferson Community, Spalding, Louisville Presbyterian Theological Seminary, and Southern Baptist Theological Seminary – form the Kentuckiana Metroversity.

The University of Louisville has had notable achievements including several hand transplants and the world's first self-contained artificial heart transplant.

Two major graduate-professional schools of religion are also located in Louisville. The Southern Baptist Theological Seminary, with more than 5,300 students, is the flagship institution of the Southern Baptist Convention. It was founded in Greenville, South Carolina, in 1859 and moved to Louisville in 1877, occupying its present campus on Lexington Road in 1926. Louisville Presbyterian Theological Seminary, product of a 1901 merger of two predecessor schools founded at Danville, Kentucky in 1853 and in Louisville in 1893, occupied its present campus on Alta Vista Road in 1963.

According to the U.S. census, of Louisville's population over 25, 21.3% (the national average is 24%) hold a bachelor's degree or higher and 76.1% (80% nationally) have a high school diploma or equivalent.

=== Libraries ===
In 1908, Louisville was home to the country's first public library in the South for African Americans housed in a Carnegie-funded facility. This public library still stands today as the Western Colored Branch Public Library known today as the Louisville Free Public Library, Western Branch. It took its place in history as the first in the nation to provide library services exclusively for the African American community, using only African American staff. African Americans in Louisville were among the leaders in a national struggle to address the injustices this system imposed. Albert Meyzeek, a black educator who over the years served as principal at several local schools was one of the leaders in the effort to build positive community infrastructures for purposes of racial uplift. During his three-year tenure as principal at the segregated Central High School, Meyzeek led the campaign to establish a black library, that being the Western Colors Branch Public Library.

In addition to establishing the first public library for African Americans in the South, two other members of Louisville's black middle class, Rev. Thomas Fountain Blue, the administrative head of the Western and Eastern Colored Branches, and Rachel Davis Harris, a children's library specialist and the chief assistant in charge of school and extensive work, worked to establish both branches as community social centers. In 1917, 498 meetings were held at both branches, with close to 12,000 in attendance. In 1912, Blue organized an apprenticeship librarian class, the only opportunity for formal training for prospective black librarians in the South at the time.

== Media ==
Louisville's newspaper of record is The Courier-Journal. The alternative paper is the progressive alt-weekly Louisville Eccentric Observer (commonly called LEO), which was founded by then-future, former 3rd district U.S. Representative John Yarmuth (D).

WAVE 3, an NBC affiliate, was Kentucky's first TV station. Another prominent TV station is ABC affiliate WHAS 11, formerly owned by the Bingham family (who also owned the Courier Journal), which hosts the regionally notable annual fundraiser, the WHAS Crusade for Children. Other television stations in the city include CBS affiliate WLKY 32 and Fox affiliate WDRB 41 (along with its dual The CW/MyNetworkTV affiliated sister station WBKI 58).

The most popular radio stations are WGZB-FM and 84 WHAS 840 AM. The latter was designated by the FCC as a clear-channel station, and was formerly owned by the Binghams (now iHeartMedia), and is a talk radio station that also broadcasts regional sports.

Louisville Public Media operates three National Public Radio member stations in the city: news and talk WFPL, classical WUOL-FM, and adult album alternative WFPK.

== Infrastructure ==
=== Transportation ===
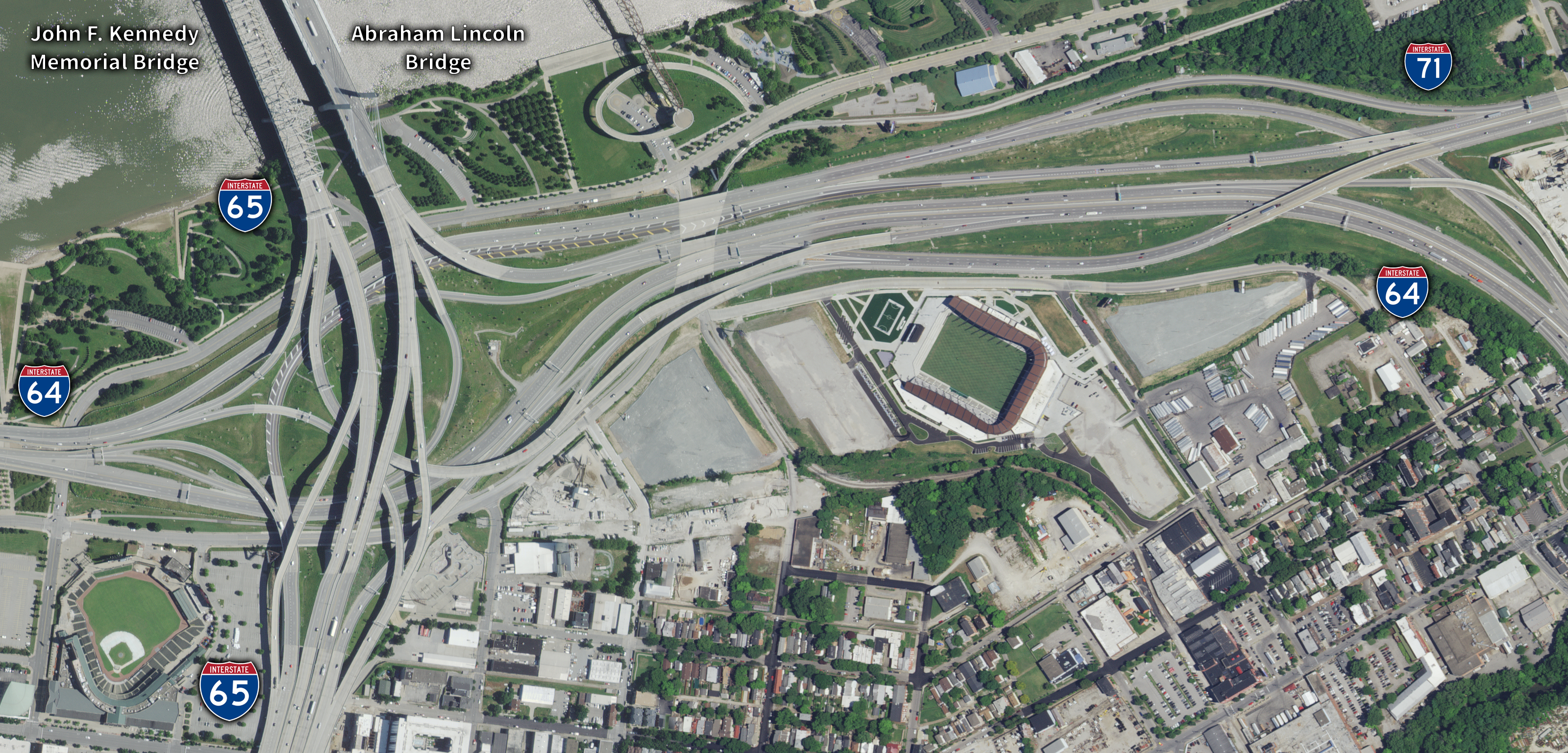
Kennedy Interchange ("Spaghetti Junction"), after completion of the Ohio River Bridges Project

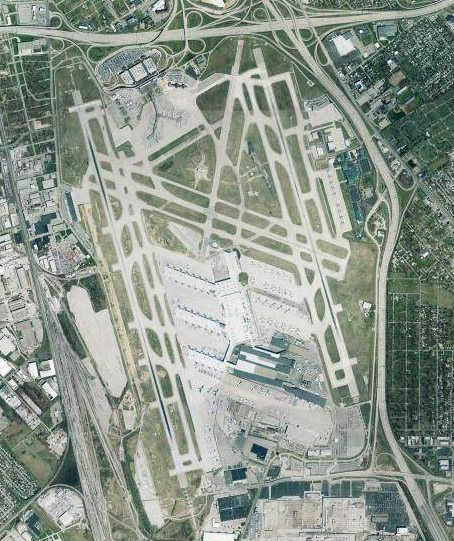
Louisville Muhammad Ali International Airport

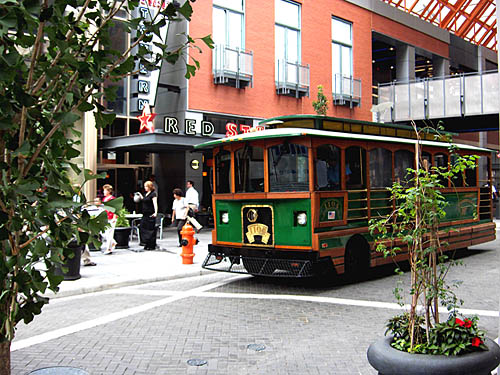
Toonerville II Trolleys provided transportation in downtown Louisville until late 2014, before being replaced by LouLift.

Louisville has inner and outer interstate beltways, I‑264 and I‑265 respectively. Interstates I‑64 and I‑65 pass through Louisville, and I-71 has its southern terminus in Louisville. Since all three of these highways intersect at virtually the same location on the east side of downtown, this spot has become known as "Spaghetti Junction". Three bridges carry I‑64 and I‑65 over the Ohio River, and a fourth automobile bridge carries non-interstate traffic, including bicyclists and pedestrians. Immediately east of downtown is the Big Four Bridge, a former railroad bridge that has been renovated into as a pedestrian bridge.

The Ohio River Bridges Project, a plan under consideration for decades to construct two new interstate bridges over the Ohio River to connect Louisville to Indiana, including a reconfiguration of Spaghetti Junction, began construction in 2012. One bridge, the Abraham Lincoln Bridge, is located downtown beside the existing Kennedy Bridge for relief of I‑65 traffic. The other, named the Lewis and Clark Bridge, connects I‑265 between the portions located in southeast Clark County, Indiana and northeast Jefferson County, Kentucky (Louisville Metro). Both bridges and corresponding construction were finished in 2016.

Louisville's main airport is the centrally located Louisville Muhammad Ali International Airport, whose IATA Airport code (SDF) reflects its former name of Standiford Field. The airport is also home to UPS's Worldport global air hub. UPS operates its largest package-handling hub at Louisville International Airport and bases its UPS Airlines division there. Over 4.2 million passengers and over 4.7 billion pounds (2,350,000 t) of cargo pass through the airport each year. It is also the second busiest airport in the United States in terms of cargo traffic, and fourth busiest for such in the world. Only about 35 minutes from Fort Knox, the airport is also a major hub for armed services personnel. The historic but smaller Bowman Field is used mainly for general aviation while nearby Clark Regional Airport is used mostly by private jets.

The McAlpine Locks and Dam is located on the Kentucky side of the Ohio River, near the downtown area. The locks were constructed to allow shipping past the Falls of the Ohio.

Public transportation consists mainly of buses run by the Transit Authority of River City (TARC). The city buses serve all parts of downtown Louisville and Jefferson County, as well as Kentucky suburbs in Oldham County, Bullitt County, and the Indiana suburbs of Jeffersonville, Clarksville and New Albany. In addition to regular city buses, transit throughout the downtown hotel and shopping districts is served by a fleet of zero-emissions buses called LouLift. In late 2014, these vehicles replaced the series of motorized trolleys known as the Toonerville II Trolley. A light rail system was proposed for the city in the late 1990s and early 2000s, but was put on hold in 2004 due to a lack of state and local funding sources. A bus rapid transit system, named Dixie Rapid, began service in 2020.

Louisville has historically been a major center for railway traffic. The Louisville and Nashville Railroad was once headquartered here, before it was purchased by CSX Transportation. Today the city is served by two major freight railroads, CSX (with a major classification yard in the southern part of the metro area) and Norfolk Southern. Five major main lines connect Louisville to the rest of the region. Two regional railroads, the Paducah and Louisville Railway and the Louisville and Indiana Railroad, also serve the city. With the discontinuance of the stop in Louisville in 2003 for a more northerly route between New York and Chicago, the Kentucky Cardinal no longer serves the city; it is thus the fifth largest city in the country with no passenger rail service.

In 2016 Walk Score ranked Louisville 43rd "most walkable" of 141 U.S. cities with a population greater than 200,000.

=== Utilities ===
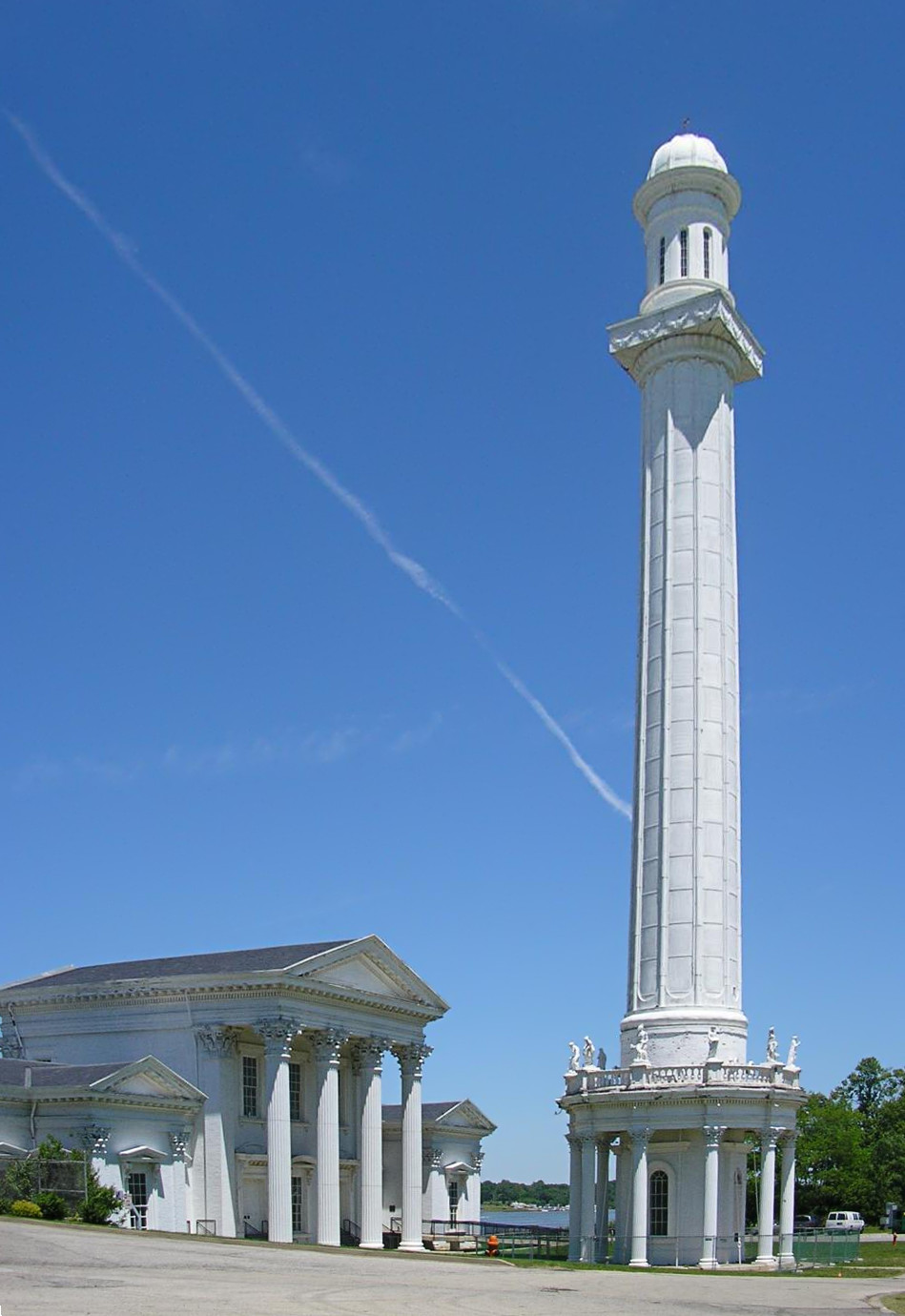
Completed in 1860, the Louisville Water Tower is the oldest water tower in the U.S.

Electricity is provided to the Louisville Metro area by Louisville Gas & Electric. Water is provided by the Louisville Water Company, which provides water to more than 800,000 residents in Louisville as well as parts of Oldham and Bullitt counties. Additionally, they provide wholesale water to the outlying counties of Shelby, Spencer and Nelson.

The Ohio River provides for most of the city's source of drinking water. Water is drawn from the river at two points: the raw water pump station at Zorn Avenue and River Road, and the B.E. Payne Pump Station northeast of Harrods Creek. Water is also obtained from a riverbank infiltration well at the Payne Plant. There are also two water treatment plants serving the Louisville Metro area: The Crescent Hill Treatment Plant and the B.E. Payne Treatment Plant. In June 2008, the Louisville Water Company received the "Best of the Best" award from the American Water Works Association, citing it as the best-tasting drinking water in the country.

=== Public safety ===
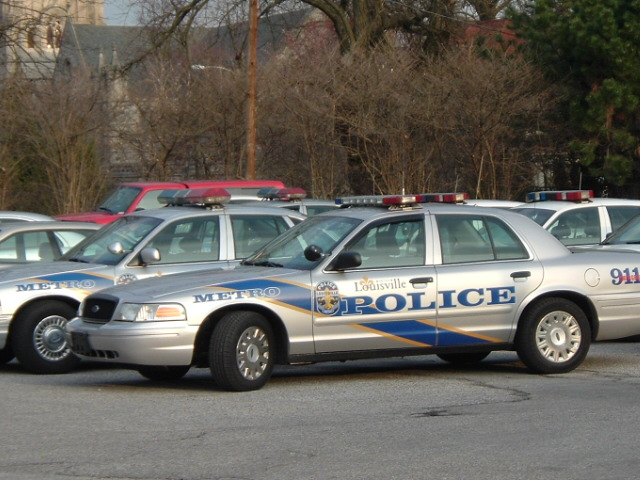
Metro Police cruiser

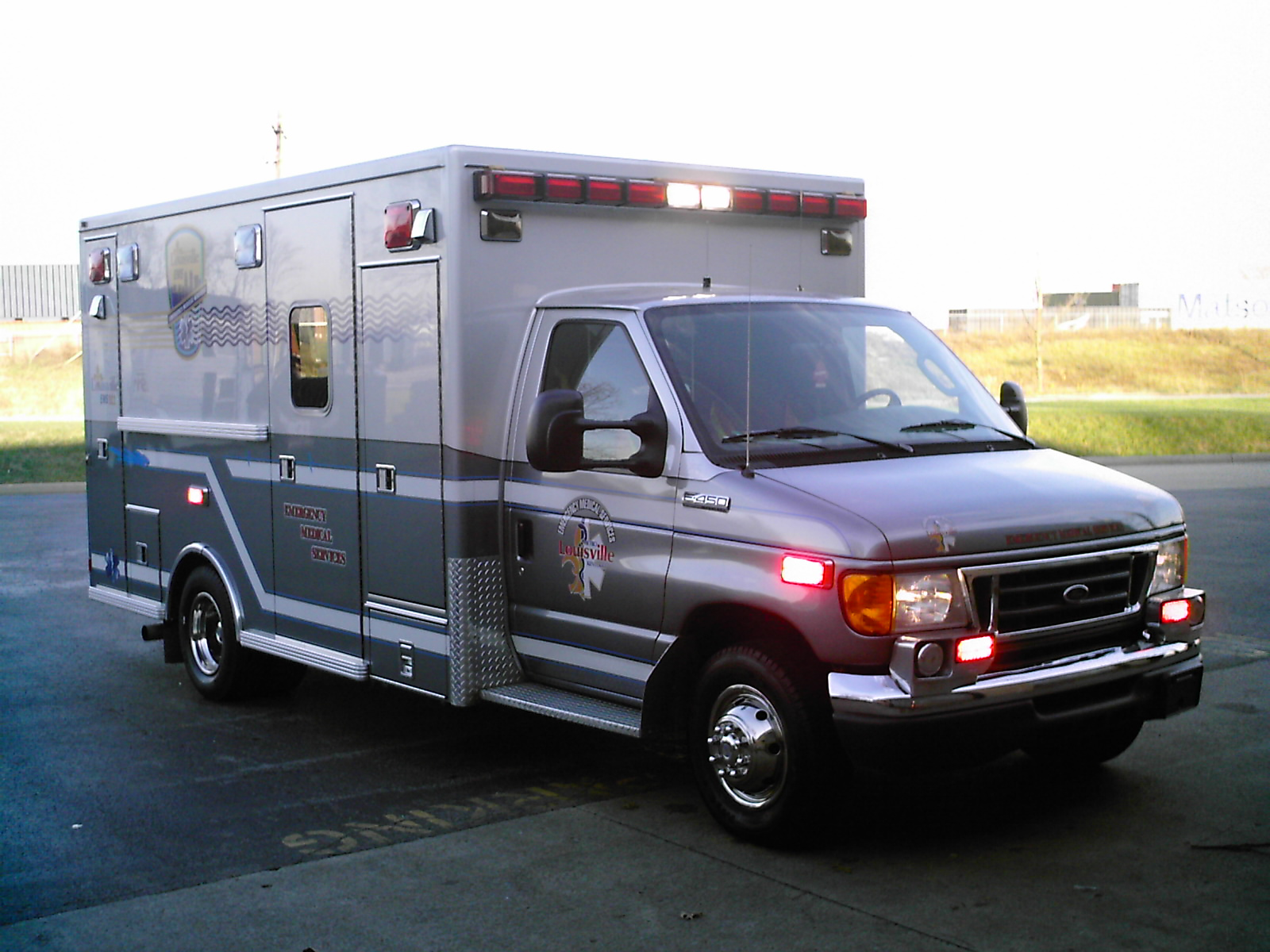
Louisville Metro EMS ambulance

The primary law enforcement agencies are the Louisville Metro Police Department (LMPD) and the Jefferson County Sheriff's Office (JCSO). 911 emergency medical services are provided by the government as Louisville Metro EMS.

Fire protection is provided by 16 independent fire departments working in concert through mutual aid agreements. The only fire department operated by Metro Government is Louisville Fire & Rescue, the successor to the pre-merger Louisville Division of Fire. The city of Shively in western Jefferson County possesses an independent fire department that uses the same dispatch and radio channels as Louisville Fire and Rescue.

== Sister cities ==
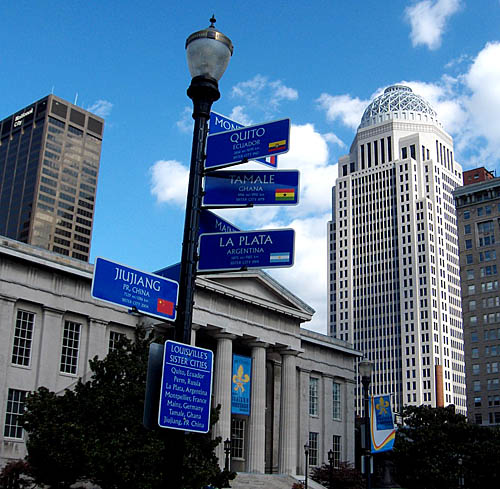
Distances to Louisville's sister cities on a downtown light post

Louisville's sister cities are:

- Adapazarı, Turkey
- Jiujiang, China
- Mainz, Germany
- Montpellier, France
- La Plata, Argentina
- Quito, Ecuador
- Tamale, Ghana

Louisville was a sister city with Perm, Russia. However, this relationship was temporarily suspended by Mayor Greg Fischer in June 2022 in light of the Russian invasion of Ukraine.

In addition, Louisville has been recognized as a "friendship city". The two cities have engaged in many cultural exchange programs, particularly in the fields of nursing and law, and cooperated in several private business developments, including the Frazier History Museum.

Although not a sister city, Louisville has friendly and cooperative relations with Chengdu, China.

== See also ==
- List of cities and towns along the Ohio River
- USS Louisville, four ships
