= List of tallest buildings in Kentucky =

This list of tallest buildings in Kentucky ranks skyscrapers in the U.S. state of Kentucky by height. The tallest building in Kentucky is 400 West Market in Louisville, which rises 167 meters/549 feet and was completed in 1993.

== Tallest buildings ==
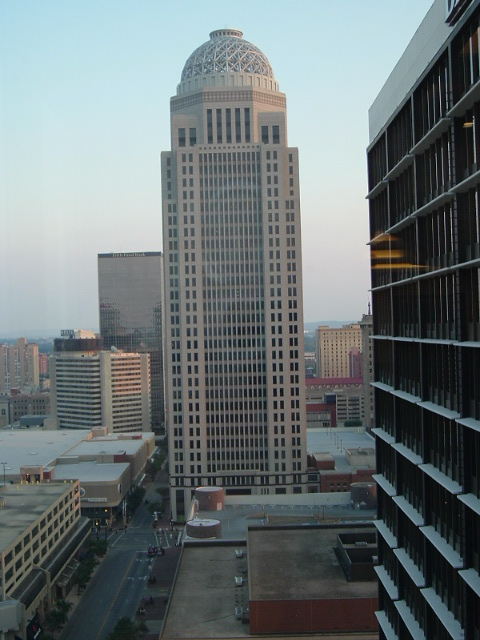
400 West Market, the tallest building in Kentucky

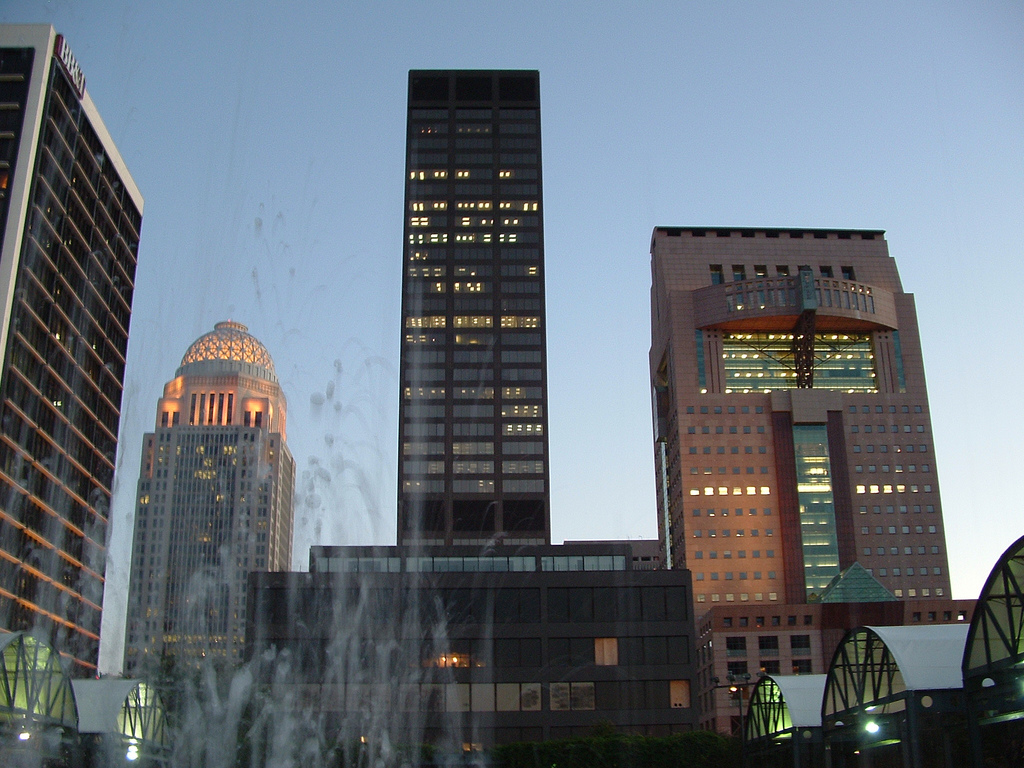
PNC Tower (center), Kentucky's 2nd tallest building

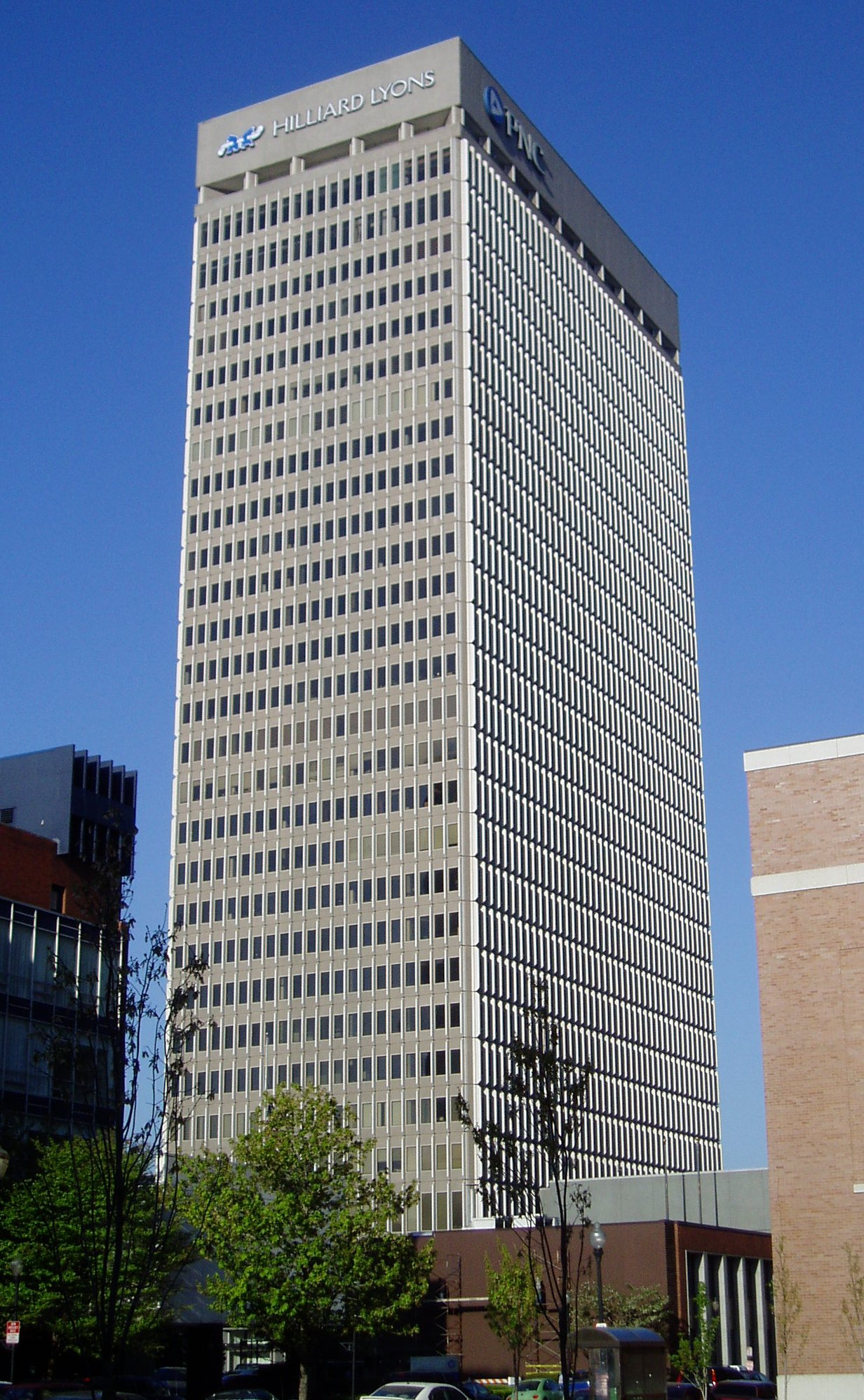
PNC Plaza, Kentucky's 3rd tallest building

This lists ranks Kentucky buildings that stand at least 250 feet (76 m) tall, based on standard height measurement. This includes spires and architectural details but does not include antenna masts. Existing structures are included for ranking purposes based on present height. Out of the 29 buildings, 17 of them are located in Louisville. Out of the remaining 12, 5 buildings are located in Lexington, 3 are in Covington, 1 in Frankfort, 1 in Richmond, and 1 in Bowling Green.

Was the tallest building in Kentucky upon completion

Rank	Name	Image	Height ft (m)	Floors	Year	City	Notes
1	400 West Market		549 (167)	35	1993	Louisville	Formerly AEGON Center; formerly Capital Holding Tower; formerly Providian Center; tallest building in Kentucky, 1993 to present
2	PNC Tower	PNC Tower, Louisville, KY	512 (156)	40	1972	Louisville	Formerly First National Tower and National City Tower; tallest building in Kentucky, 1972–1993. Has the most floors of any building in Kentucky, with 40 floors.
3	PNC Plaza		420 (128)	30	1971	Louisville	Formerly Citizens Plaza; tallest building in Kentucky, 1971-1972
4	Humana Building		417 (127)	27	1985	Louisville	
5	Lexington Financial Center		410 (125)	32	1987	Lexington	Tallest building in Lexington, tallest building in Kentucky outside of Louisville
6	Omni Louisville Hotel		363 (111)	30	2018	Louisville	Tallest Hotel and tallest residential building in Kentucky 2018–present
7	Waterfront Park Place		364 (111)	22	2004	Louisville	Tallest residential building in Kentucky, 2004–2018
8	B&W Tower		363 (111)	26	1982	Louisville	
9	Meidinger Tower		363 (111)	26	1982	Louisville	
10	Waterfront Plaza II		340 (104)	25	1993	Louisville	
11	Waterfront Plaza I		340 (104)	25	1991	Louisville	
12	Kincaid Towers		333 (101)	22	1979	Lexington	Tallest building in Lexington, 1979–1987
13	LG&E Center		328 (100)	23	1989	Louisville	
14	RiverCenter I		308 (94)	18	1990	Covington	
15	The Ascent at Roebling's Bridge		293 (89)	21	2008	Covington	Daniel Libeskind, Architect
16	RiverCenter II		292 (89)	15	1998	Covington	
17	The 800 Apartments		290 (88)	29	1963	Louisville	Tallest residential building in Kentucky, 1963–2004
18	BB&T Building		288 (88)	24	1972	Louisville	
19	Galt House (Rivue Tower)		260 (79)	25	1972	Louisville	Tallest hotel in Kentucky 1972–2018
20	Commonwealth Hall		251 (77)	20	1967	Richmond	
21	Louisville Metro Housing Authority Avenue Plaza Apartments		250 (76)	18	1974	Louisville	
22	Patterson Office Tower		250 (76)	20	1968	Lexington	
23	Heyburn Building		250 (76)	17	1927	Louisville	Tallest Building in Kentucky, 1927–1955
24	Pearce-Ford Tower		250 (76)	26	1970	Bowling Green	Tallest college-residential building in Kentucky
25	Hilton Lexington/Downtown		240 (73)	22	1982	Lexington	
26	Vine Center		233 (71)	17	1982	Lexington	
27	Galt House (Suite Tower)		210	20	1985	Louisville	

== Tallest demolished ==
Rank	Name	Image	Height ft (m)	Floors	Years	City	Notes
1	Capital Plaza Tower		338 (100)	28	1972–2020	Frankfort	Demolished during 2020, tallest demolished building in Kentucky
2	Blanding Tower		262 (80)	23	1969–2020	Lexington	Demolished 2020
3	Kirwan Tower		262 (80)	23	1969–2020	Lexington	Demolished 2020
4	Commonwealth Building		255 (78)	21	1955–1971	Louisville	Formerly the tallest building in Kentucky

== Timeline of tallest buildings ==
Name	City	Years as tallest	Height ft / m	Floors	Ref.
400 West Market	Louisville	1993–present	549-foot (167 m)	35	
National City Tower	Louisville	1972–1993	512-foot (156 m)	40	
PNC Plaza	Louisville	1971–1972	420-foot (128 m)	30	
Commonwealth Building	Louisville	1955–1971	255-foot (78 m)	21	
Heyburn Building	Louisville	1928–1955	250-foot (76 m)	17	
Kentucky Home Life Building	Louisville	1912–1927	235-foot (72 m)	19	
Kentucky State Capitol	Frankfort	1910–1912	210-foot (64 m)	3	
Mother of God Roman Catholic Church	Covington	1871–1910	180-foot (55 m)	1	

== See also ==
- List of tallest buildings in Louisville
- Capital Plaza Office Tower in Frankfort demolished
- PNC Plaza Bought With Embezzled Money in 2020
