= List of tallest buildings in Louisville =

Skyline of Louisville
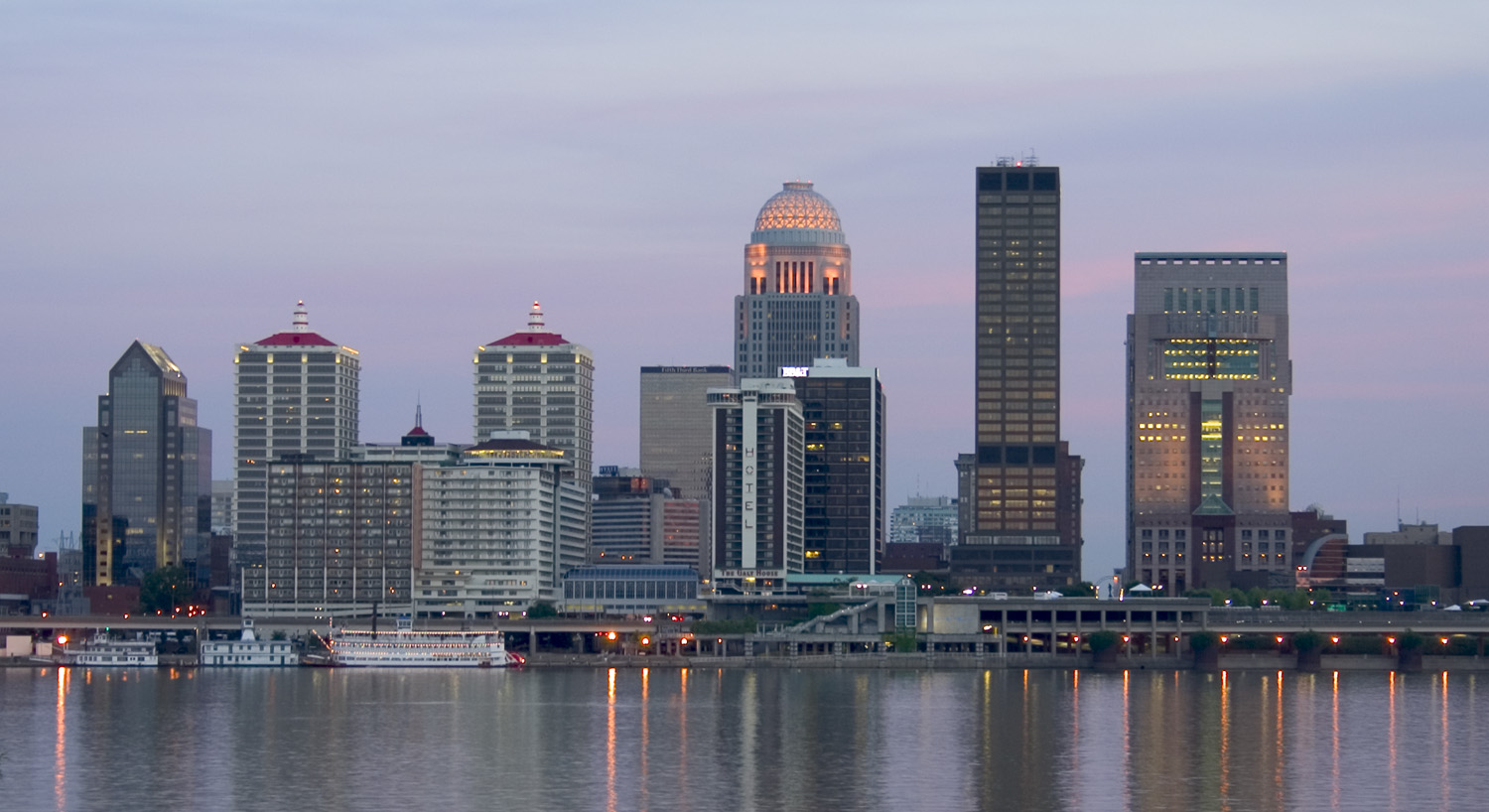
- Downtown Louisville in 2005
- Tallest building: 400 West Market (1992)
- Tallest building height: 549 ft (167.3 m)
- First 150 m+ building: PNC Tower (1972)

Number of tall buildings (2026)
- Taller than 100 m (328 ft): 10
- Taller than 150 m (492 ft): 2

Number of tall buildings — feet
- Taller than 200 ft (61.0 m): 25
- Taller than 300 ft (91.4 m): 12

Louisville's skyline at night in 2021

Louisville is the largest city in the U.S. state of Kentucky, with a metropolitan area population of over 1.3 million. Louisville is home to 25 buildings that stand over 200 feet (61 m) tall as of 2026, 12 of which exceed 300 feet (91 m) in height. Two skyscrapers reach a height of 492 ft (150 m), the most in Kentucky and the second most of any city in the East South Central states, after Nashville. The tallest building in Louisville and in Kentucky is 400 West Market, which was built in 1992 and is 549 ft (167.3 m) tall. The skyscraper is known for its 80-foot (24 m) high Romanesque dome. The second tallest building in Louisville is PNC Tower, which was formerly the city's tallest building from 1972 to 1992.

The ten-story Columbia Building, built in 1890, is considered to be the city's first skyscraper. The 236 ft (72 m), 19-story Kentucky Home Life Building became the tallest building in Louisville when it was completed in 1912, and it was surpassed by the 250 ft (76 m) Heyburn Building in 1928. The designs of both buildings were influenced by neoclassical architecture. Following the onset of the Great Depression, skyscraper development stalled over the next two decades. In 1955, the Commonwealth Building became the tallest in Louisville after a 17-story vertical addition was built on top of the existing four-story structure.

A construction boom took place from the 1960s and 1980s. The 800 Apartments, a 29-story residential tower, became the city's tallest building when it opened in 1963. 500 West Jefferson was the first building in Louisville to reach a height of 400 ft (122 m) in 1971, though it was surpassed by PNC Tower a year later. The 1980s saw the addition of taller office buildings such as B&W Tower in 1982 and the Humana Building in 1985, both taller than 300 ft (91 m), culminating in the construction of 400 West Market and the Waterfront Plaza twin towers in the early 1990s. Since then, the rate of high-rise construction in Louisville has declined. Significant projects in the 21st century include Waterfront Park Place, a 23-story residential tower built in 2004, and Omni Louisville Hotel, the city's fifth tallest building at 370 ft (113 m), in 2018.

Most of Louisville's tallest buildings are situated in Downtown Louisville, which is south of the Ohio River. Downtown Louisville is bounded by Interstate 64 to the north, while Interstate 65 runs through the east of downtown. The University of Louisville School of Medicine has its main campus in the southeast of downtown. The campus and the surrounding hospitals include several high-rises.

== History ==
Number of buildings by height in Louisville by the end of each year, based on the information in this article. This takes into account two demolished buildings. Click on the legend to toggle a specific height on or off. View chart definition.

== Map of tallest buildings ==
The map below shows the location of buildings taller than 200 ft (61 m) in Downtown Louisville, where most of the city's tallest buildings stand. Each marker is numbered by the building's height rank, and colored by the decade of its completion.

Buildings taller than 200 ft (61 m) in Louisville. An asterisk (*) next to the building's name indicates it is located outside the map.
- 1950s and before
- 1960s
- 1970s
- 1980s
- 1990s
- 2000s
- 2010s
1 400 West Market
2 PNC Tower
3 500 West Jefferson
4 Humana Building
5 Omni Louisville Hotel
6 B&W Tower
7 Meidinger Tower
8 Waterfront Plaza I
9 Waterfront Plaza II
10 E.ON U.S. Center
11 Galt House
12 BB&T Building
13 Waterfront Park Place
14 The 800 Apartments
15 Heyburn Building
16 Hyatt Regency Louisville
17 Frazier Rehab Institute
18 Kentucky Home Life Building
19 Rudd Heart and Lung Center
20 Medical Center Tower
21 1400 Willow Avenue*
22 Kentucky Towers Apartments
23 Wright Tower*
24 Starks Building
25 Brown Hotel

== Cityscape ==
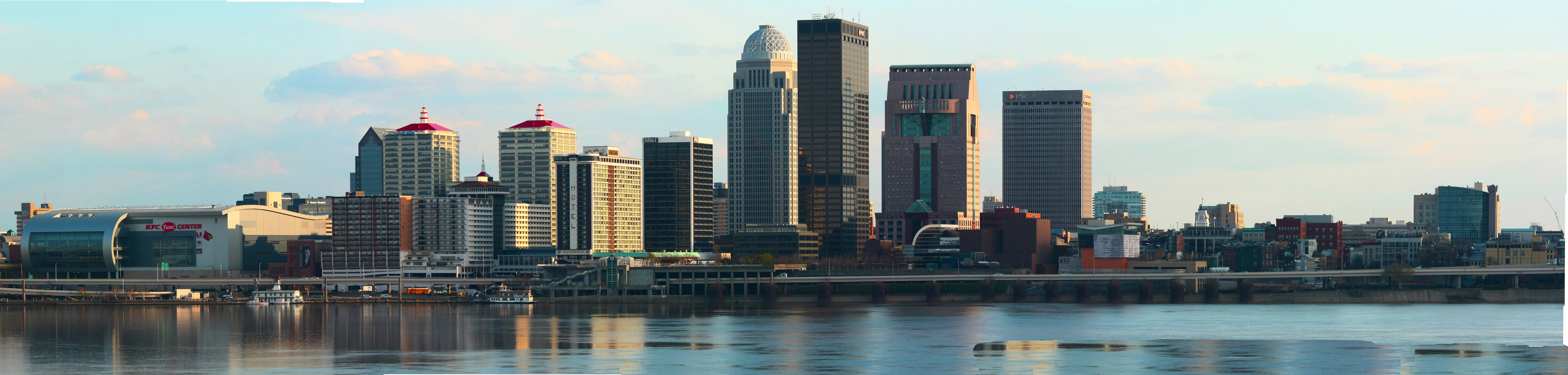
Panorama of the Louisville skyline in 2011

== Tallest buildings ==
This list ranks completed buildings in Louisville that stand at least 200 ft (61 m) tall as of 2026, based on standard height measurement. This includes spires and architectural details but does not include antenna masts. The “Year” column indicates the year of completion. Buildings tied in height are sorted by year of completion with earlier buildings ranked first, and then alphabetically.

Was the tallest building Louisville in upon completion

| Rank | Name | Image | Location | Height ft (m) | Floors | Year | Purpose | Notes |
|---|---|---|---|---|---|---|---|---|
| 1 | 400 West Market | | 38°15′17″N 85°45′26″W | 549 (167.3) | 35 | 1992 | Office | Tallest building in Louisville and in Kentucky since 1992. Originally called Capital Holding Building and later, Capital Holding Center. Renamed Providian Center, then Aegon Center. Renamed 400 West Market in 2014. Tallest building completed in Louisville in the 1990s. |
| 2 | PNC Tower | | 38°15′22″N 85°45′29″W | 512 (156.1) | 40 | 1972 | Office | Formerly known as First National Tower from 1972 to 1994, and National City tower from 1994 to 2017. Tallest building in Louisville and in Kentucky from 1972 to 1992. Tallest building completed in Louisville in the 1970s. |
| 3 | 500 West Jefferson | | 38°15′13″N 85°45′33″W | 420 (128) | 30 | 1971 | Office | Originally built as Citizens Plaza, and later known as PNC Plaza until 2020. Also known as 500W and 500 West. Tallest building in Louisville and Kentucky briefly from 1971 to 1972. |
| 4 | Humana Building | | 38°15′23″N 85°45′31″W | 417 (127.1) | 27 | 1985 | Office | Formerly the headquarters of Humana. Humana announced in 2024 that it would vacate the building in a cost-cutting move. In 2026, Louisville mayor Craig Greenberg announced that the building would be turned into a 1,000-room convention center hotel. Tallest building completed in Louisville in the 1980s. |
| 5 | Omni Louisville Hotel | | 38°15′08″N 85°45′18″W | 370 (112.8) | 30 | 2018 | Mixed-use | Mixed-use residential and hotel building. Tallest mixed-use building in Louisville. Tallest building completed in Louisville in the 2010s. |
| 6 | B&W Tower | | 38°15′10″N 85°45′25″W | 363 (110.6) | 26 | 1982 | Office | Headquarters of tobacco company Brown & Williamson until 2004, when the company merged with R. J. Reynolds. |
| 7 | Meidinger Tower | | 38°15′05″N 85°45′28″W | 363 (110.6) | 26 | 1982 | Office | |
| 8 | Waterfront Plaza I | – | 38°15′25″N 85°45′19″W | 340 (103.6) | 25 | 1991 | Office | Waterfront Plaza I and Waterfront Plaza II are the tallest twin buildings in Louisville. |
| 9 | Waterfront Plaza II | – | 38°15′25″N 85°45′22″W | 340 (103.6) | 25 | 1993 | Office | Waterfront Plaza I and Waterfront Plaza II are the tallest twin buildings in Louisville. |
| 10 | E.ON U.S. Center | – | 38°15′21″N 85°45′17″W | 328 (100) | 23 | 1989 | Office | Also known as Louisville Gas & Electric Tower and Corporate Plaza. |
| 11 | Galt House | | 38°15′29″N 85°45′24″W | 325 (99.1) | 25 | 1972 | Hotel | Tallest all-hotel building in Louisville. Tallest building with a hotel component in Louisville until 2018. |
| 12 | BB&T Building | – | 38°15′26″N 85°45′26″W | 312 (95) | 24 | 1972 | Office | Former names include the Louisville Trust Building, One Riverfront Plaza, United Kentucky Building, and Bank One Building. |
| 13 | Waterfront Park Place | | 38°15′26″N 85°44′53″W | 290 (88.4) | 23 | 2004 | Residential | Tallest building completed in Louisville in the 2000s. |
| 14 | The 800 Apartments | | 38°14′38″N 85°45′33″W | 289 (88) | 29 | 1963 | Residential | Tallest building in Louisville and Kentucky from 1963 to 1971. Tallest residential building in Louisville from 1963 to 2004. |
| 15 | Heyburn Building | | 38°14′45″N 85°45′29″W | 250 (76.2) | 17 | 1928 | Office | Tallest building in Louisville and Kentucky from 1928 to 1955, when it was overtaken by the 17-story addition of the now demolished Commonwealth Building. |
| 16 | Hyatt Regency Louisville | – | 38°15′12″N 85°45′24″W | 246 (75) | 18 | 1978 | Hotel | |
| 17 | Frazier Rehab Institute | – | 38°14′56″N 85°45′01″W | 246 (75) (Note: Sources do not state the exact height of this building. This figure was determined using Google Earth by subtracting the altitude of the building's lowest main pedestrian open-air entrance from its highest architectural point.) | 14 | 2004 | Health | |
| 18 | Kentucky Home Life Building | | 38°15′15″N 85°45′30″W | 236 (72) | 19 | 1912 | Office | Formerly known as the Inter-Southern Life Insurance Building. Tallest building in Louisville from 1912 to 1928. |
| 19 | Rudd Heart and Lung Center | – | 38°14′59″N 85°45′04″W | 224 (68) | 15 | 1994 | Health | |
| 20 | Medical Center Tower | | 38°14′58″N 85°44′53″W | 220 (67) | 14 | 1974 | Health | |
| 21 | 1400 Willow Avenue | – | 38°14′08″N 85°42′33″W | 220 (67) | 21 | 1980 | Residential | |
| 22 | Kentucky Towers Apartments | | 38°15′04″N 85°45′32″W | 210 (64) | 19 | 1927 | Residential | |
| 23 | Wright Tower | | 38°13′42″N 85°38′22″W | 206 (62.8) | 15 | 1966 | Office | Originally built as the headquarters of the Lincoln Income Life Insurance Company and known as Lincoln Tower. Kaden acquired the building in 1986, after which the building was known as Kaden Tower. Renamed Wright Tower in 2023 in honor of Frank Lloyd Wright. Designed by William Wesley Peters, a student of Wright. |
| 24 | Starks Building | | 38°15′05″N 85°45′25″W | 200 (61) | 14 | 1913 | Office | |
| 25 | Brown Hotel | | 38°14′48″N 85°45′29″W | 200 (61) | 16 | 1923 | Hotel | The Brown Hotel is a historic hotel listed on the National Register of Historic Places. |

== Tallest under construction or proposed ==
=== Under construction ===
As of 2026, there are no buildings under construction in Louisville that are planned to be taller than 200 ft (61 m).

=== Proposed ===
| Name | Height ft (m) | Floors | Year | Purpose | Notes |
|---|---|---|---|---|---|
| One Forty West | 329 (100) | 27 | – | Hotel | On the corner of Second and West Market Streets. Construction is set to begin early 2027. |

== Tallest demolished ==
There have been two buildings taller than 200 ft (61 m) in Louisville that no longer stand today. Both were once the tallest buildings in Louisville.

| Name | Image | Height ft (m) | Floors | Year completed | Year demolished | Notes |
|---|---|---|---|---|---|---|
| Commonwealth Building | – | 255 (77.7) | 21 | 1955 | 1994 | Originally built as a mid-rise building in 1928. In 1955, a 17-story vertical addition was constructed, making the building the tallest in Louisville from 1955 to 1963. Demolished via implosion in 1994. |
| Lincoln Savings Bank Building | – | 204 (62) | 15 | 1906 | 1973 | Also known as the Washington Building. Tallest building in Louisville from 1906 to 1912. |

== Timeline of tallest buildings ==
| Name | Image | Years as tallest | Height ft (m) | Floors | Notes |
|---|---|---|---|---|---|
| Kenyon Building | | 1886–1890 | 115 (35.1) | 6 | |
| Columbia Building | | 1890–1906 | 161 (49) | 10 | |
| Lincoln Savings Bank Building | – | 1906–1912 | 204 (62) | 15 | |
| Kentucky Home Life Building | | 1912–1928 | 236 (72) | 19 | |
| Heyburn Building | | 1928–1955 | 250 (76.2) | 17 | |
| Commonwealth Building | – | 1955–1963 | 255 (77.7) | 21 | |
| The 800 Apartments | | 1963–1971 | 289 (88) | 29 | |
| PNC Plaza (Note: Now known as 500 West Jefferson) | | 1971–1972 | 420 (128) | 30 | |
| First National Tower (Note: Now known as PNC Plaza.) | | 1972–1992 | 512 (156.1) | 40 | |
| 400 West Market | | 1992–present | 549 (167.3) | 35 | |

== See also ==
- List of tallest buildings in Kentucky
- List of tallest buildings in Knoxville
- List of tallest buildings in Memphis
- List of tallest buildings in Nashville
- Cityscape of Louisville, Kentucky
