= Newell B. McClaskey House =

Historic house in Kentucky, United States

- U.S. National Register of Historic Places
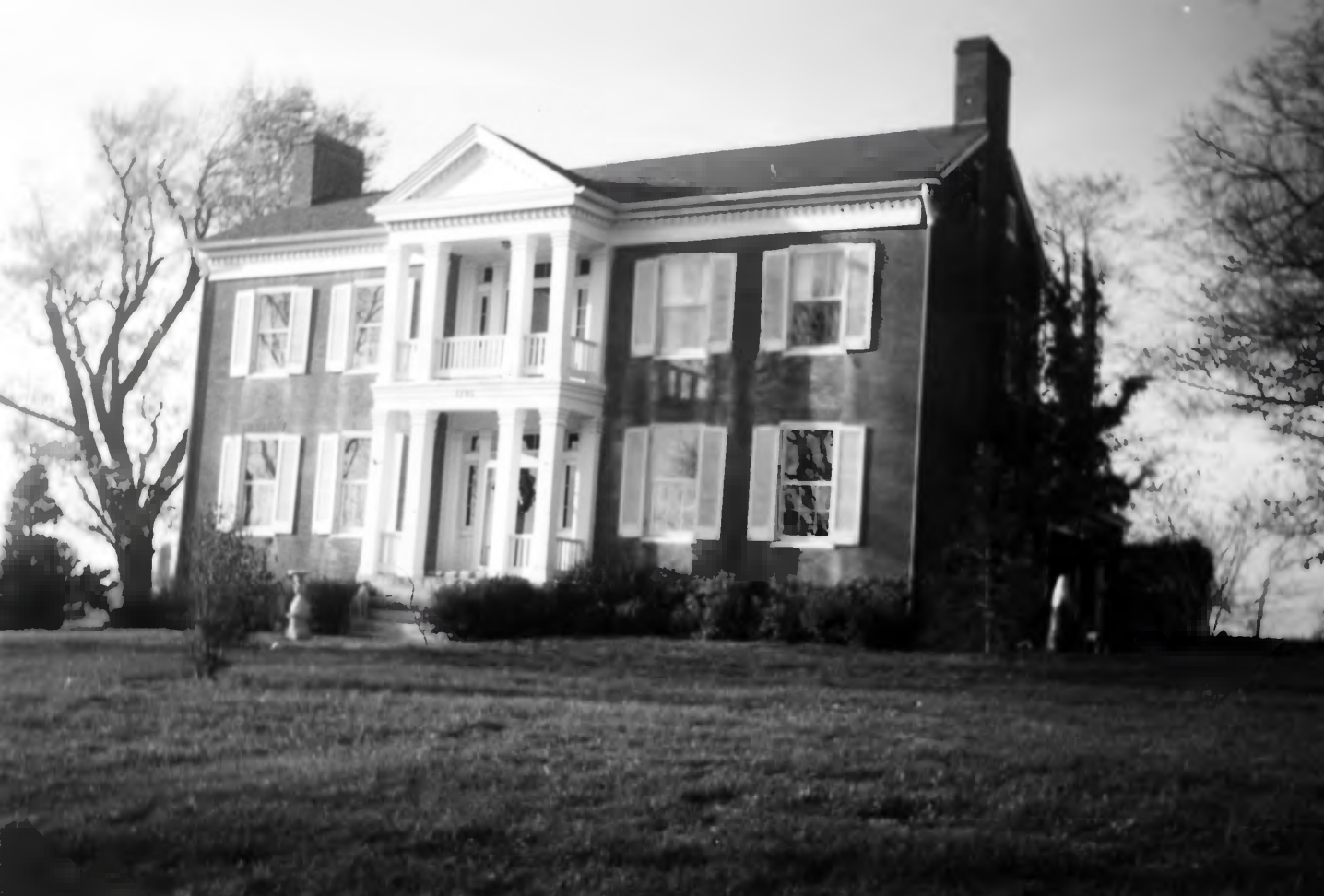
- Coordinates: 37°55′24″N 85°16′16″W
- Built: 1835
- Architect: George Batcheldor
- Architectural style: Greek Revival, Federal
- NRHP reference No.: 00000269
- Added to NRHP: March 24, 2000

Newell Beauchamp McClaskey House is a historic site and building, a plantation house, and former plantation, located in Bloomfield, Kentucky which is part of the Bluegrass region. At one time, this site was worked and maintained by enslaved African American people.

It has been listed in the National Register of Historic Places since March 24, 2000, for its architectural significance.

== McClaskey family and history ==
The McClaskey family was descendant from Scottish immigrants, prior to the 1740s. Newell Beauchamp McClaskey was an early settler of Nelson County. By 1829, McClaskey had acquired over 700 acres of land. The family cleared the land, built houses, farmed the land, and started a distillery.

The house was built in 1835 for Newell Beauchamp McClaskey (1806–1865) and his wife, Nancy née Bodine (1807–1880). After Nancy Bodine McClaskey's death in 1880, the site was left to their many children, and it stayed in the family heirs until 1938.

The house was sold in 1944 to businessman and real estate developer James Graham Brown, former owner of the Brown Hotel in Louisville, Kentucky. Other owners included Ralph and Margaret Burgin (from 1947 to 1990), Laurin Wathen (from 1990 to 1991), and Rondell and Joyce Jacobs (from 1991 to ?).

== Architecture ==
The plantation house was designed and built by architect George Batcheldor (c. 1810–1879), who had come to Kentucky in 1830s from Massachusetts. Batcheldor's other notable buildings in Kentucky include the Walnut Grove House, Duncan Hall, the Micajah Glasscock House, and the Gray House.

The Newell B. McClaskey House has a five bay facade, with transom windows and sidelights, and central passage. It was designed as Federal architecture-style, with Greek Revival architectural influences. The complex includes a brick smokehouse, brick slave quarters with a gabled tin roof, two 19th century barns, and two corn cribs.

== See also ==
- National Register of Historic Places listings in Nelson County, Kentucky
