= PNC Plaza =

PNC Plaza may refer to one of several skyscrapers in the United States that have held large offices of the PNC Financial Services company:

- 500 West Jefferson, a 31-story skyscraper in Louisville, Kentucky
- Tower at PNC Plaza, a 33-story skyscraper in Pittsburgh, Pennsylvania
- PNC Plaza (Raleigh), a 33-story skyscraper in Raleigh, North Carolina
