= James Graham Brown =

American businessman and real estate developer

- Born: August 18, 1881; Madison, Indiana
- Died: March 20, 1969 (aged 88); Louisville, Kentucky
- Resting place: Cave Hill Cemetery
- Education: Hanover College
- Occupations: Businessman and real estate developer

James Graham Brown (August 18, 1881— March 20, 1969) was an American businessman and real estate developer best known as the builder of the Brown Hotel in Louisville, Kentucky and for his philanthropy.

== Early life ==
Born in Madison, Indiana, he moved to Louisville in 1903 and founded, with his brother and father, the W.P. Brown and Sons Lumber Company. Brown also began developing commercial buildings, concentrated around Downtown Louisville, including the Brown Hotel, Brown Theater, Brown Garage, the Commonwealth Building (originally the Martin Brown Building), and Kentucky Towers.

From 1944 until 1947, Brown owned the Newell B. McClaskey House and plantation in Bloomfield, Kentucky.

== Later career ==
Brown was still involved with downtown hotel development in the 1960s, as well as suburban developments like the Brown Suburban Hotel, and a 97-acre (390,000 m^{2}) development on the site of his east end farm which eventually became Baptist Hospital East and the surrounding business and retail center called Breckenridge Square. He served on the board of directors of Churchill Downs for 32 years.

Brown was an opponent of organized labor, once threatening to sell his hotels to the highest bidder if employees organized. Brown would not desegregate his hotel and theater until public accommodation laws forced change. When "Porgy and Bess," which had an all black cast, was playing at the Brown Theatre, local blacks were barred from attending. During the early 1960s, civil rights sit-ins were held in front of the Brown Theatre.

== Philanthropic work ==
Later in his life he became active in philanthropy, pledging $1.5 million in 1962 to fund the establishment of the Louisville Zoo. He donated a similar amount to build a student center at his Alma mater, Hanover College. He also donated heavily to the University of Louisville and to various other schools and hospitals. He was also a lifelong supporter of the Boy Scouts of America. Many of these donations were anonymous. He lived in a small suite at his hotel for much of his life.

At the time of his death, Brown had no heirs, and his estate was estimated to be worth $100 million, making him the wealthiest man in Kentucky at the time. The bulk of the estate was given to a charitable foundation that bore his name. The foundation, which he had created in 1943, has donated to local and state causes over the years, and remains active as of 2020. The current active President and CEO of the foundation as of 2020 is local Louisville resident, Mason Bennett Rummel. The foundation claims $462,816,066 in donations through 2,700 grants so far. Projects the foundation has made key donations to include Louisville Waterfront Park and the University of Louisville's James Graham Brown Cancer Center. An early donation allowed the Kentucky Derby Museum to be created.

== Death and burial ==
Brown died of congestive heart failure and was buried in Cave Hill Cemetery.
