= Omni Louisville Hotel =

Skyscraper in Downtown Louisville, Kentucky

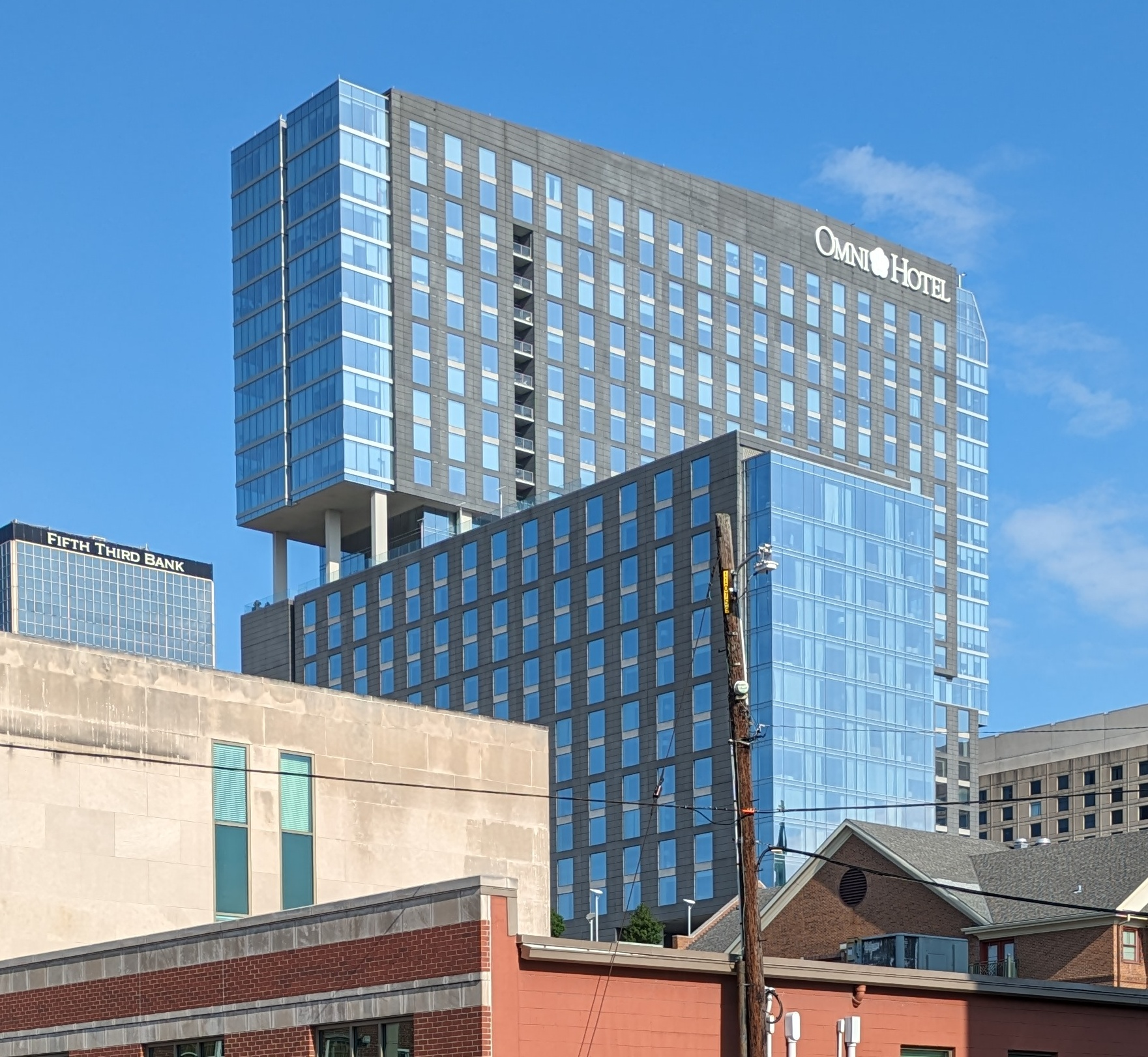
- Omni Louisville Hotel in 2023
- Interactive map of the Omni Louisville Hotel area

General information
- Status: Completed
- Location: 400 South 2nd St.
- Coordinates: 38.25231291705561°N 85.75471526509513°W
- Construction started: January 2016
- Completed: March 2018

Height
- Height: 417 ft (127 m)

Technical details
- Floor count: 30

Design and construction
- Architect: HKS
- Developer: Omni Hotels and Resorts
- Main contractor: Calhoun Construction

Omni Louisville Hotel is a 30-story, 394-foot-tall (120 m) skyscraper, in Louisville, Kentucky. The tower is currently the tallest residential building in the state. Omni Louisville Hotel is located at 400 S. Second Street.

== History ==
Omni Louisville Hotel was originally planned to be developed by both Omni Hotels and Resorts and Cordish Company. In January 2015, Louisville Mayor Greg Fischer announced that Cordish Company would no longer participate in developing the project. A groundbreaking ceremony was held for the development in January 2016, with expected completion in the spring of 2018. The tower boasts 612 hotel rooms and 225 apartment units, along with ground floor retail space.

== Construction ==
Omni Louisville Hotel began construction in January 2016 and was completed in March 2018. Brasfield & Gorrie served as the general contractor for the building and was designed by HKS.

== See also ==
- List of tallest buildings in Louisville
