= Starks Building =

- U.S. National Register of Historic Places
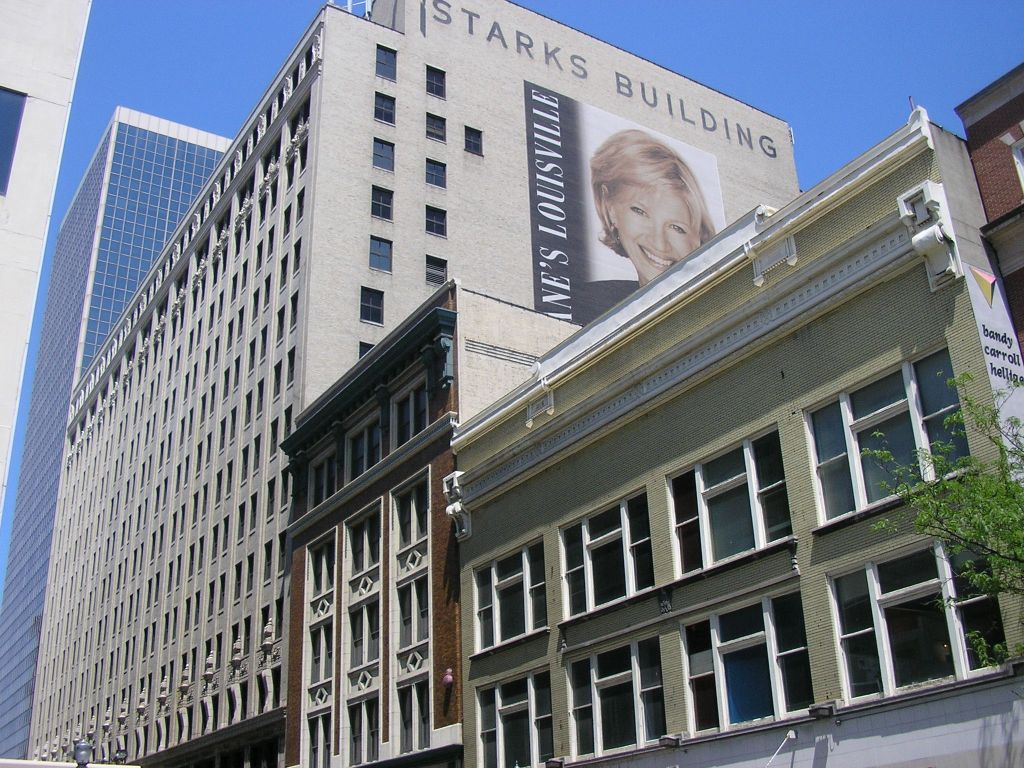
- Starks Building from Muhammad Ali Boulevard

- Location within Kentucky Location within the United States
- Location: Louisville, Kentucky
- Coordinates: 38°15′4″N 85°45′24″W
- Area: less than one acre
- Built: 1913
- Architect: Daniel Burnham
- Architectural style: Beaux-Arts; Chicago School
- NRHP reference No.: 85001508
- Added to NRHP: July 11, 1985

The Starks Building is a 14-story landmark building on South 4th Street and West Muhammad Ali Boulevard in Downtown Louisville, Kentucky, USA. Built in 1913 at the site of the First Christian Church of Louisville, local businessman John Starks Rodes commissioned the 202-foot (62 m) building as designed by Daniel Burnham. The building was added to the National Register of Historic Places in 1985.

Its architecture fits the Chicago School (architecture) with Beaux Arts details. Cream-colored bricks are one of its signature features. It is decorated with classical motifs, including acanthus leaves, lion's heads and urns. It was originally a U-shaped structure, but a 1926 addition designed by the firm Graham, Anderson, Probst & White added a new wing to create a rectangular shape with a central sunlight well. At the bottom of the central atrium was a courtyard, and until 1984 it was covered with a Plexiglas skylight.

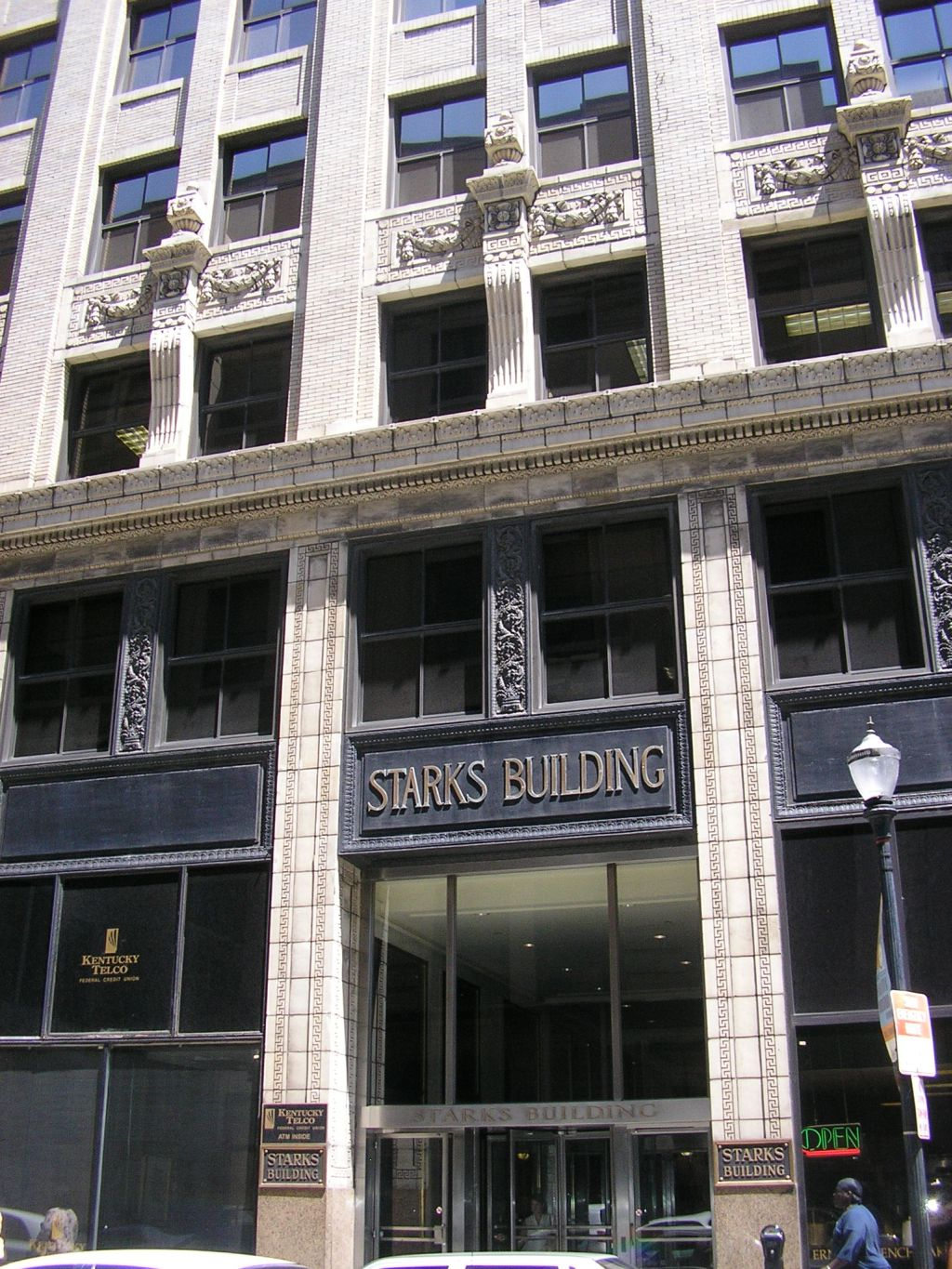
Main entrance and detail of stonework

== Property Ownership ==
The Starks family owned the building until the mid-1980s when it was sold to an investment group, resold in 1997 to Empire State Collateral until the mortgage defaulted, and ownership was given over to Allstate in 2004. In 2004, the mixed-use space was listed as the 11th largest office complex in Louisville by Business First.

Notable long-time tenants include the Colonnade Cafeteria, Seng Jewelers and Rodes Men's and Women's Clothing. Colonnade Cafeteria moved into the Starks Building basement in 1926 and remained until 2006. Rodes Clothing, founded by John Starks Rodes himself, was located in the building from 1914 until the company relocated in 2004.

The building was sold again in 2006 to the Hertz Investment Group. Since the purchase in 2006, occupancy has risen to 71 percent, as of May 2010, according to Hertz Investment Group. The Starks building signed a number of new tenants during 2009, including an 11,500-square-foot (1,070 m2) Eddie Merlot's restaurant, part of a Fort Wayne, Ind.-based upscale steakhouse chain. With Eddie Merlot's, all the Starks' street-level space has been leased.

It is connected by a skyway to Fourth Street Live!, an entertainment mall adjacent on the North side. On July 2, 2007, the Cordish Company, developers of Fourth Street Live!, announced that it would expand the mall southward by leasing the first floor (street-level) of the Starks Building. The Baltimore-based developer has since abandoned plans to develop 20,000 square feet (1,900 m2) of vacant street-level space in the Starks Building.

== See also ==
- List of tallest buildings in Louisville
