= Heyburn Building =

- U.S. National Register of Historic Places
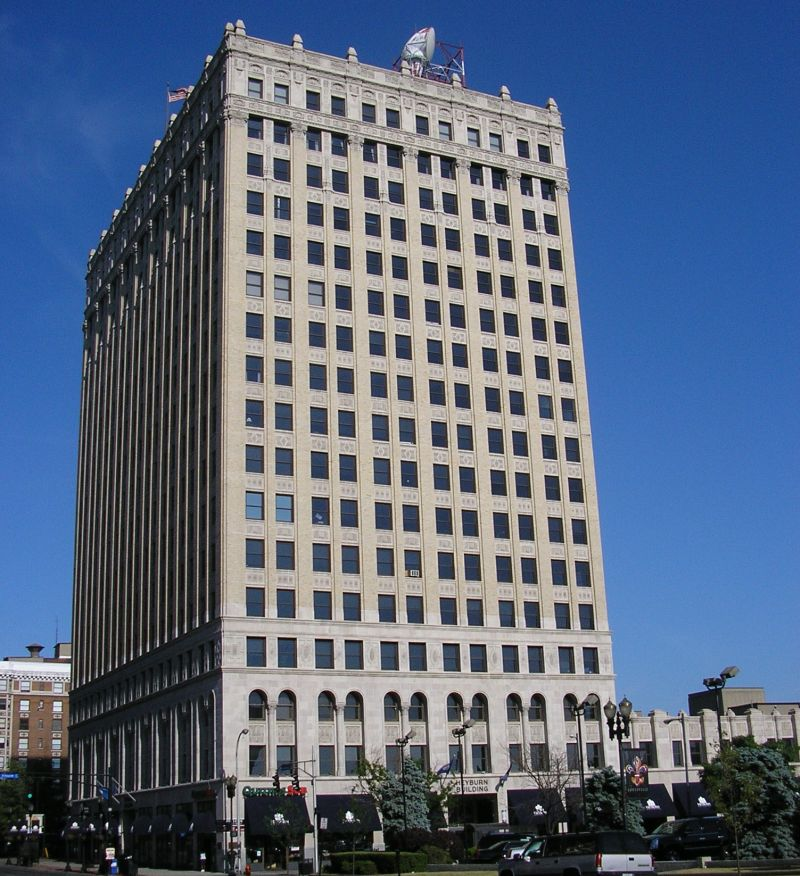
- Side view of the Heyburn Building from Broadway
- Coordinates: 38°14′44″N 85°45′28″W
- Area: Downtown Louisville
- Built: 1928
- Architect: Graham, Anderson, Probst & White
- Architectural style: Classical Revival
- NRHP reference No.: 79001007
- Added to NRHP: July 16, 1979

The Heyburn Building is a 17-floor, 250-foot (76-m) building in downtown Louisville, Kentucky, United States. In the early 20th century, it was an integral part of the "magic corner" of Fourth Street and Broadway, which rivaled Main Street as Louisville's business district.

== History ==
The Classical Revival-style Heyburn Building was completed in 1928. It was built by and named for William R. Heyburn, president of Belknap Hardware and Manufacturing Company. It was designed by the Graham, Anderson, Probst & White firm of Chicago. It was the tallest building in Kentucky until a vertical addition of the defunct Commonwealth Building was completed in 1955.

It occupies the lot that was the location of the Avery mansion, home of Louisville suffragist, Susan Look Avery. This block of West Broadway had been a posh residential corridor prior to the commercial transition of which the Heyburn Building composed a part.

By 1975, the Heyburn Building was lagging in occupancy behind some of its other downtown competitors, with more than a third of the building's leasable space vacant and many tenants leaving for newer office space in other buildings.

The Heyburn Building has gone through several owners and renovations, the largest of which occurred in 1983 at a cost of $6 million. It was added to the National Register of Historic Places in 1979, nominated as "one of Louisville's finest structures of the twentieth century". Months after its listing in the register, the Heyburn Building was reported to be at risk of closing amid low occupancy.

In the 21st century, the building has suffered from disrepair and continued vacancy. In 2019, Louisville's immigration court, which had been in the Heyburn Building for more than a year, closed abruptly; a government spokesperson cited building conditions and "multiple unsuccessful attempts to work with the lessor to address issues with several critical building systems". In 2024, the building was 40% occupied, and was listed for $7.5 million. It was reportedly under contract and slated for improvements, but as of 2025, no concrete plans had materialized. Some proposals to revitalize the building in the past have included residential conversion.

== Incidents ==
On January 21, 2010, a man committed suicide by jumping to his death from the building's top floor.

In 2018, police arrested nine Occupy ICE protesters who were blocking elevators in the building, which at the time contained an immigration court. The protesters were referred to as the "Heyburn 9" in the subsequent trial.

== See also ==
- List of tallest buildings in Louisville

Preceded by Kentucky Home Life Building	Tallest Building in Kentucky; 1928-1955	Succeeded by Commonwealth Building
