= The 800 Apartments =

High rise apartment building in Louisville, KY, US

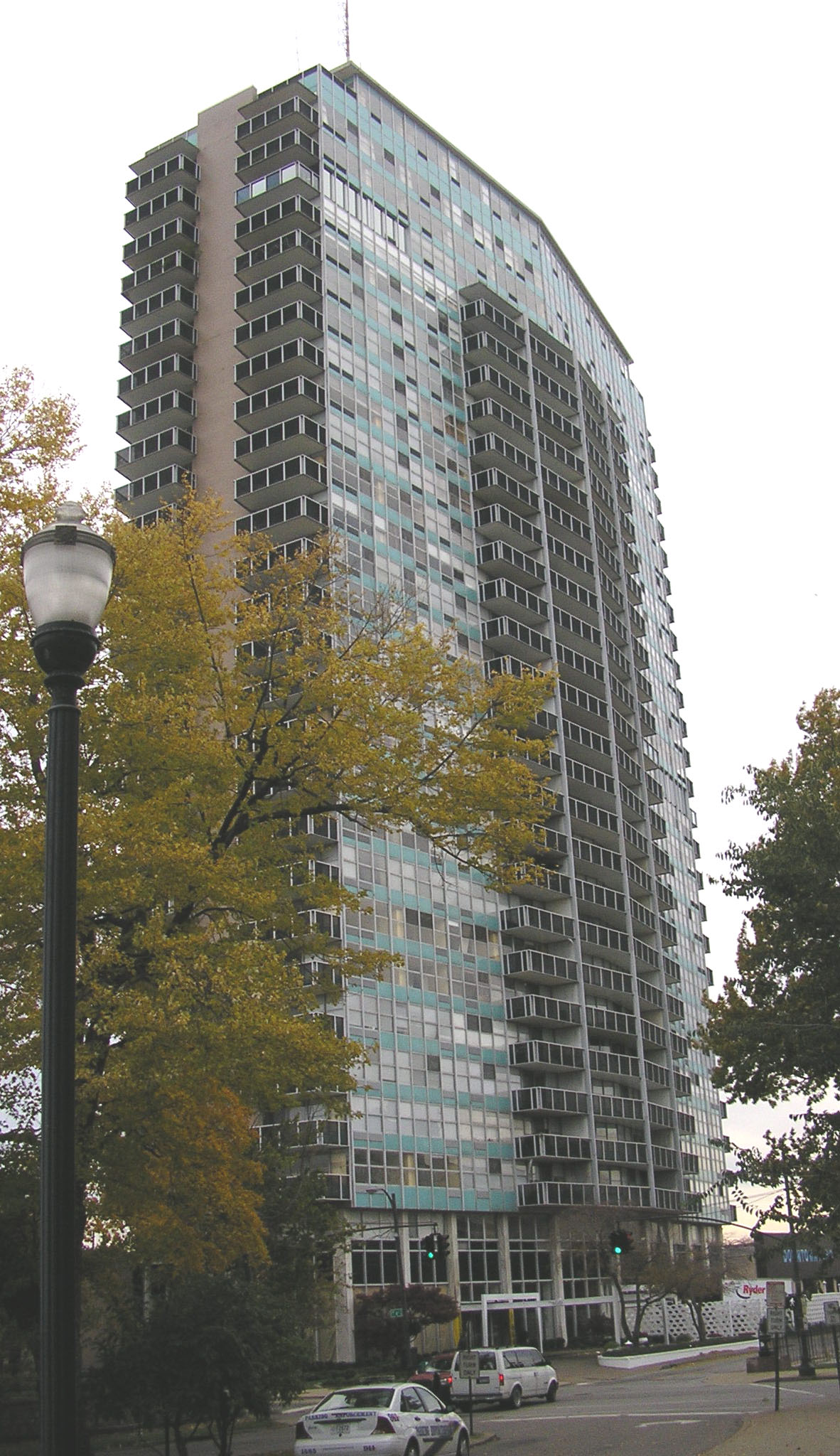
- The 800 Apartments in 2006
- Interactive map of the The 800 Apartments area

General information
- Status: Completed
- Type: Residential
- Architectural style: International Style
- Location: 800 South Fourth Street; Louisville, Kentucky, 40201
- Coordinates: 38°14′37.85″N 85°45′32.77″W
- Construction started: 1961; 65 years ago
- Completed: 1963–1964; 62 years ago
- Opened: 1963; 63 years ago
- Renovated: 2015–2016; 10 years ago
- Cost: $6 million

Height
- Antenna spire: 331 ft (101 m)
- Roof: 290 ft (88 m)

Technical details
- Floor count: 29

Design and construction
- Architects: W. S. Arrasmith (Louisville); Loewenberg & Loewenberg (Chicago)
- Developer: F. W. "Fritz" Drybrough Sr.
- Main contractor: Robert E. McKee General Contractor, Inc.

The 800 Tower, formerly The 800 Apartments, is a 29-story residential skyscraper in Louisville, Kentucky, located in the city's SoBro neighborhood, nestled between Old Louisville and downtown. At the time construction was complete in 1963, The 800 was the tallest building in Louisville, a record it maintained for nearly a decade.

The building hosts the radio transmitter for WXMA (formerly WLRS FM), which has its studio a few blocks away. From 1968 to 1988, WLRS-FM's studios occupied most of the building's ninth floor.

== History ==
Designed by architect William Strudwick Arrasmith of Louisville in consultation with Loewenberg & Loewenberg of Chicago, and developed by Frederick W. "Fritz" Drybrough Sr., construction on The 800 began in 1961. The construction contract was awarded to Robert E. McKee General Contractor, Inc. of Dallas. The building was completed 1963–64, with construction costs totaling $6 million. Already in January 1964, the building's developer and architects won the Honor Award "for superior design" from the Federal Housing Administration, the agency's first such award, which they gave to 28 out of 315 entries.

On June 16, 2015, Michigan-based property management firm, Village Green announced the purchase of the 800 Building, and renamed it 800 Tower City Apartments, and began renovations expected to exceed $10 million, and take 18 months.

== Architectural features ==
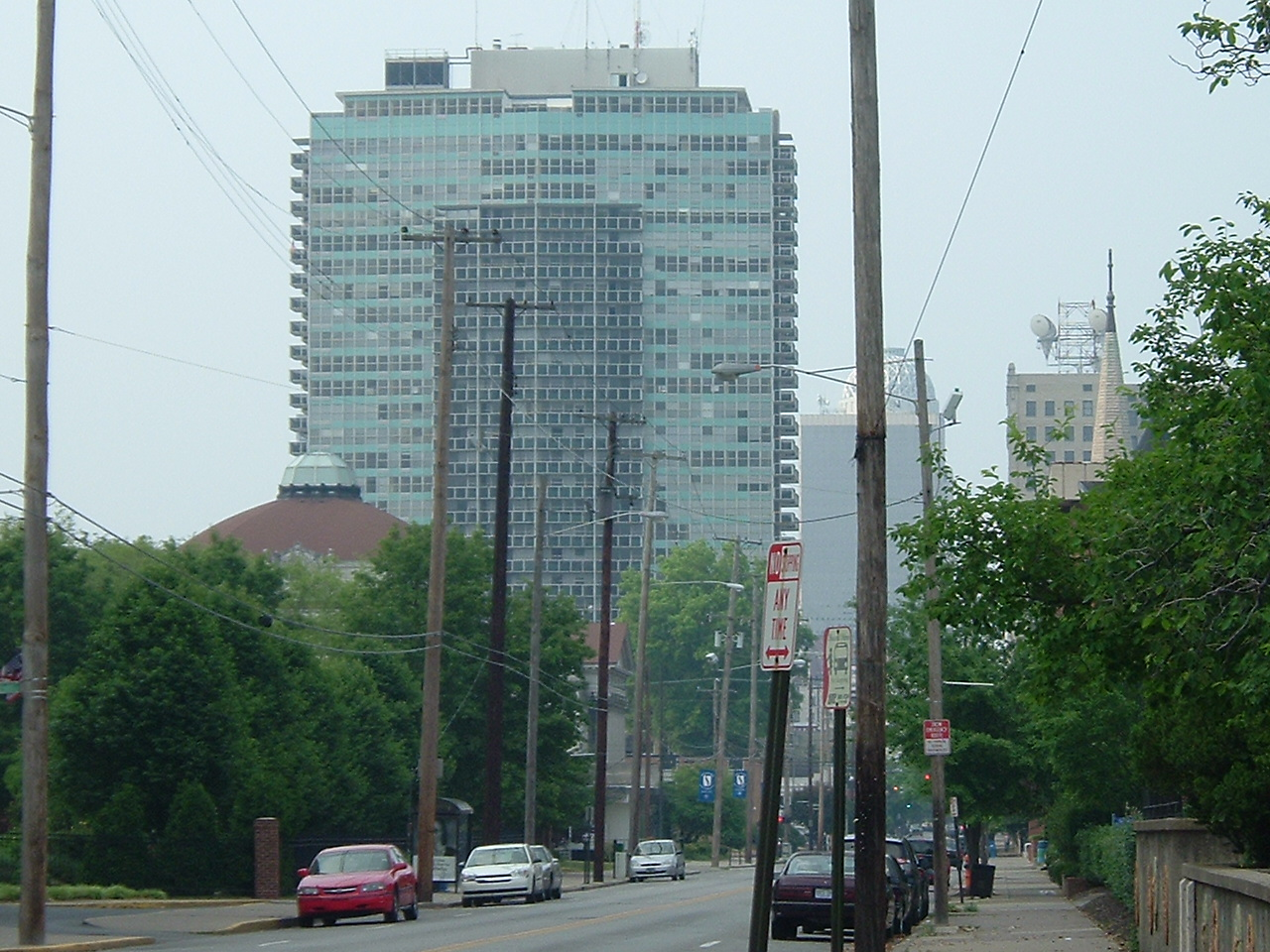
The 800 as seen from Fourth Street looking north toward downtown Louisville

The building, which has a continuous-pour reinforced concrete frame, has an aluminum curtain-wall system on its exterior with the color of the aluminum panels being a distinctive aqua, or turquoise, blue. As a result, local residents sometimes refer to it as the "Turquoise Tower of Power" (or just "Turquoise Tower"), a nickname used by disc jockeys who have broadcast from the building.

The building features an underground parking garage and four 29th floor penthouses along with an outdoor area on the roof. All rental units, except those on the 2nd floor, have outdoor balconies. The ground floor has in various years featured a restaurant from time to time, and in 2017, Bar Vetti, a new Italian restaurant with indoor and outdoor patio seating opened.

== See also ==
- List of tallest buildings in Louisville

Preceded by Commonwealth Building	Tallest building in Kentucky; 1963–1971	Succeeded by PNC Plaza
