= PNC Tower =

Skyscraper in Louisville, Kentucky, US

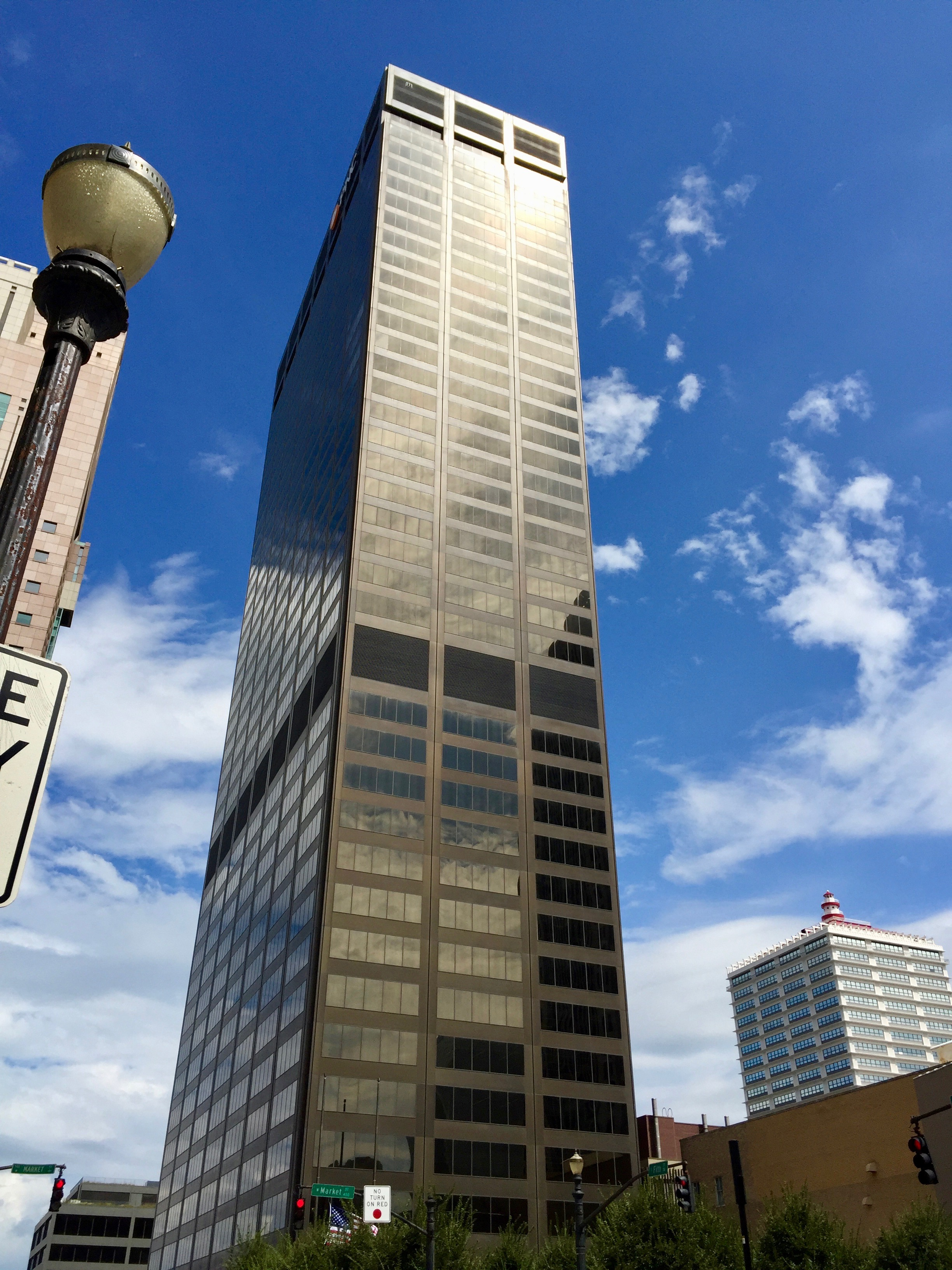
- Interactive map of the PNC Tower area
- Former names: First National Tower, National City Tower

General information
- Type: Office
- Location: 101 S. Fifth St. Louisville, Kentucky
- Coordinates: 38°15′22.4″N 85°45′28.8″W
- Opening: 1972

Height
- Roof: 512 feet (156 m)

Technical details
- Floor count: 40
- Floor area: 723,367 sq ft (67,203.0 m^{2})

Design and construction
- Architecture firm: Harrison & Abramovitz

PNC Tower is a skyscraper located at 101 South Fifth Street in Downtown Louisville, Kentucky, US. It was completed in 1972 and was originally named First National Tower.

== Naming ==
The building, originally named First National Tower, was named after First National Bank and renamed National City Tower in 1994 when First National Bank was acquired by National City Bank. The building was renamed PNC Tower in 2017.

== Height and construction ==
Completed in 1972, the 40-story, 512-foot (156 m) high structure was designed by architects Wallace Harrison and Max Abramovitz based on the timeless designs of Ludwig Mies van der Rohe. This is the only building in Louisville that Harrison & Abramovitz designed, although the firm designed more than 15 buildings in New York, including the Socony-Mobil Building and the Axa Equitable Center. PNC Tower was the tallest building in the state of Kentucky from 1972 until 400 West Market was completed in 1993. The tower is constructed of steel columns on concrete piles of caissons with an anodized aluminum and glass curtain wall. The Annex, constructed of reinforced concrete, houses the garage, retail space on the grade level and office space on the top level.

In February 2010, the National City logos on east and west sides of the tower were replaced with PNC Bank logos, due to PNC's takeover of National City Bank.

In January 2026, Yum! Brands announced it has signed a 10-year lease in the PNC Tower for its new headquarters, with plans to invest $12 million to renovate five floors. The company plans to move 550 employees to their new headquarters in late 2026.

== Lease and management ==
The building is currently leased by Jones Lang LaSalle. and managed by Cushman & Wakefield and owned by DB Oak Barrel LLC. Tenants include PNC Bank, the Louisville branch of the Federal Reserve Bank of St. Louis, Bingham Greenebaum Doll PLLC, Dinsmore & Shohl LLP and Fultz Maddox Dickens PLC.

== See also ==
- List of tallest buildings in Louisville

Preceded by PNC Plaza	Tallest building in Kentucky; 1972–1993	Succeeded by 400 West Market
