= 400 West Market =

Skyscraper in Downtown Louisville, Kentucky

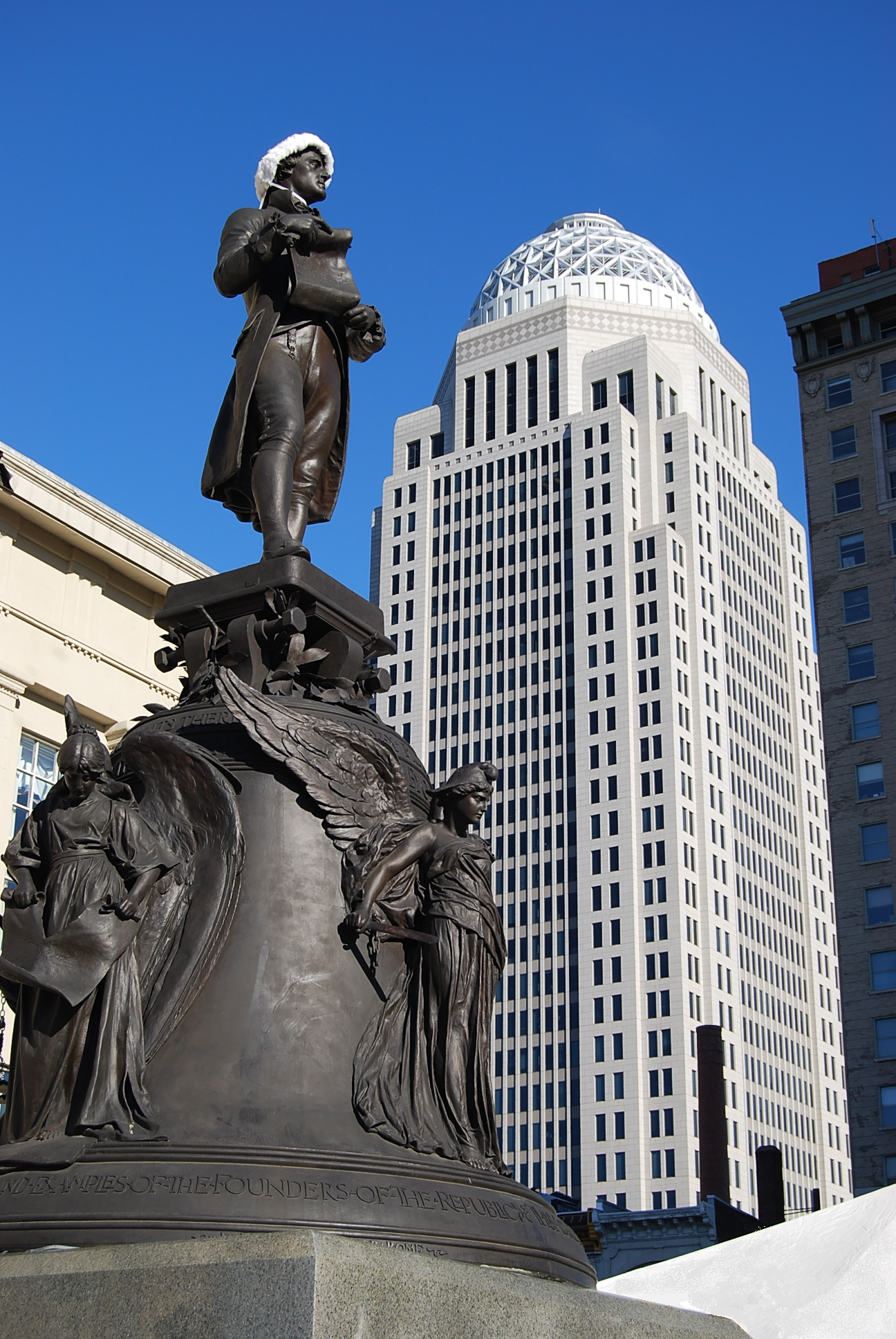
- 400 West Market in 2008

General information
- Status: Open
- Type: Office; Retail
- Location: 400 West Market; Downtown Louisville
- Coordinates: 38°15′17.7″N 85°45′25.9″W
- Construction started: July 1991
- Opening: April 1993

Height
- Roof: 549 feet (167 m)

Technical details
- Floor count: 35
- Floor area: 633,650 sq ft (58,868 m^{2})

Design and construction
- Architects: John Burgee; Philip Johnson
- Developer: Gerald D. Hines

Website
- 400wmarket.com

400 West Market is a skyscraper in Downtown Louisville, Kentucky. The 35-story, 549-foot (167 m) high structure was designed by architect John Burgee with Philip Johnson. It was Kentucky's tallest building when built for $100 million in 1991. Its groundbreaking ceremony occurred in July 1991 with initial occupancy in October 1992 and final occupancy in April 1993. Originally called Capital Holding Building and later, Capital Holding Center, the structure was later renamed Providian Center (for Providian Financial Corporation) then Aegon Center (for the Dutch financial company Aegon) as the business was renamed and sold. Aegon left the building in 2010, and the building was renamed 400 West Market in 2014.

Currently the tallest building in the Commonwealth of Kentucky, the building is constructed of reinforced concrete, as opposed to the steel construction usual for buildings of its height. A distinctive feature of the building is the 80-foot (24 m) high Romanesque dome which reflects the building's original name of Capital Holding that is illuminated from the interior at night. The upper floors of the building are also illuminated at night. 400 West Market's lighting is changed from the usual white to a combination of red and green from Thanksgiving Day until New Year's Day.

The skyscraper has 633,650 square feet (58,868 m^{2}) of leaseable space for office and 18,787 square feet (1,745 m^{2}) for retail.

The original owner of 400 West Market was a limited partnership which consisted of Hines Interest, as a general partner, and Japanese limited partners. In April, 2004, David Werner's investment group purchased the building.

There is a statue in the plaza of 400 West Market of Alysheba, winner of the 1987 Kentucky Derby and a 1993 U.S. Racing Hall of Fame inductee.

== Gallery ==
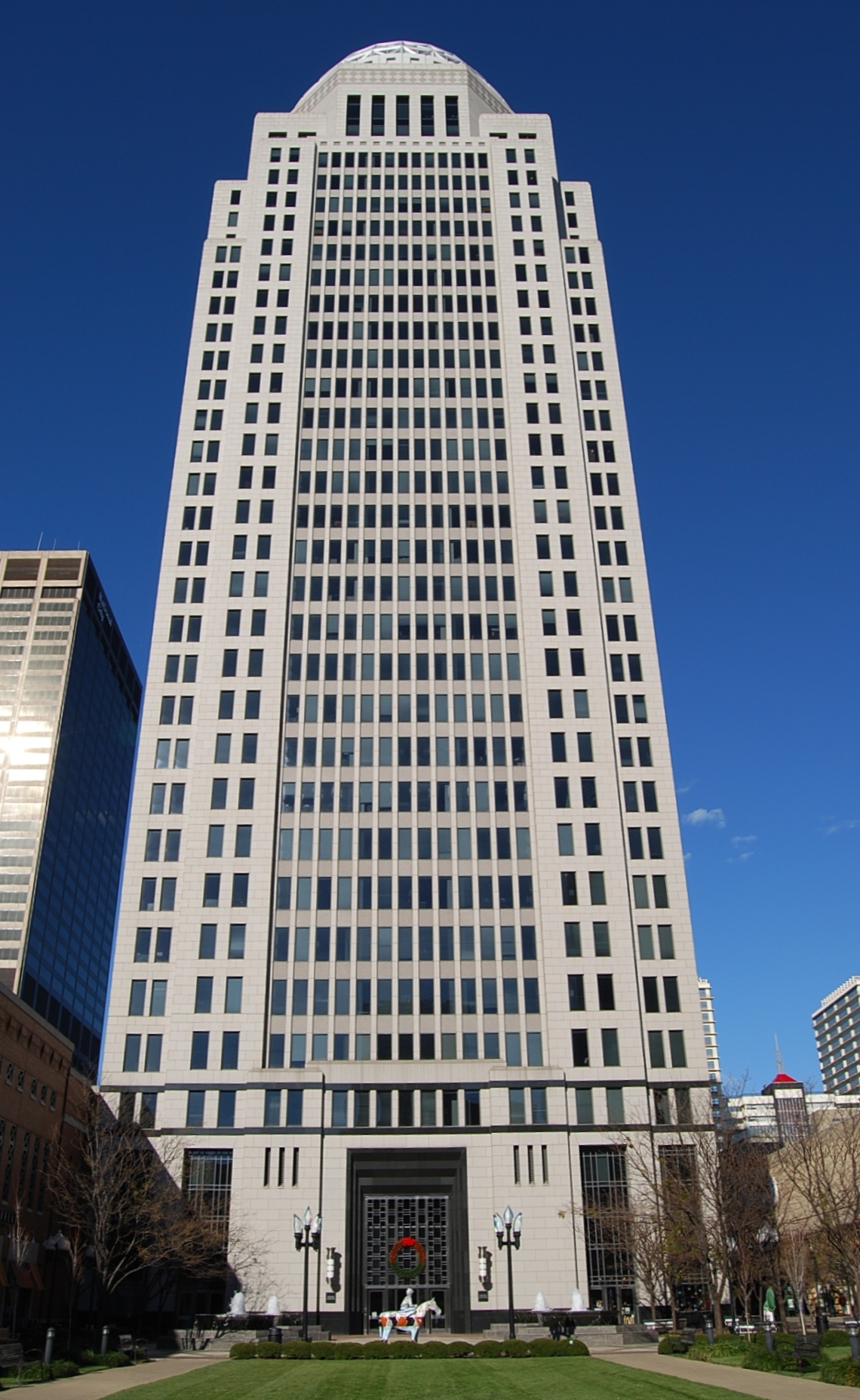

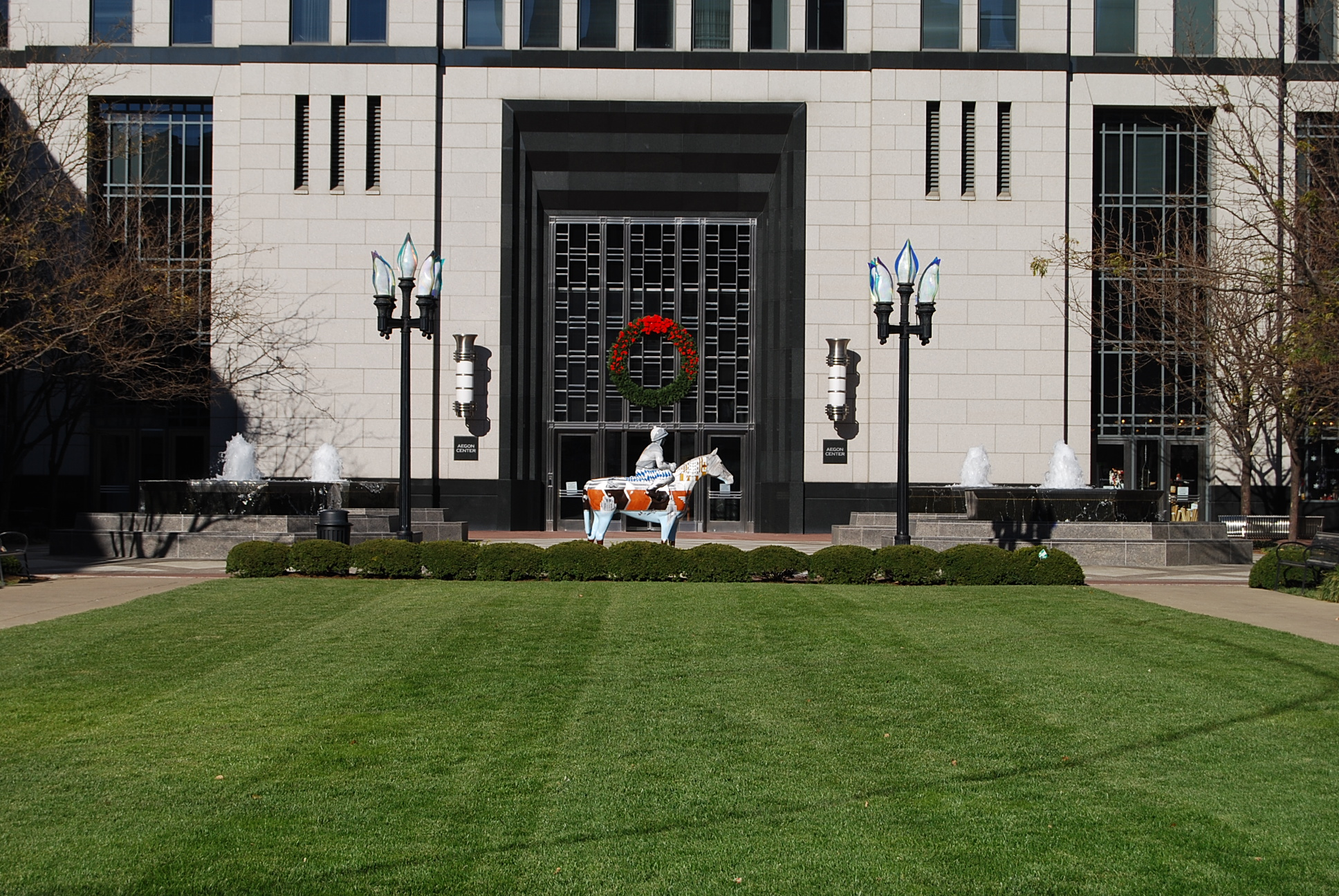

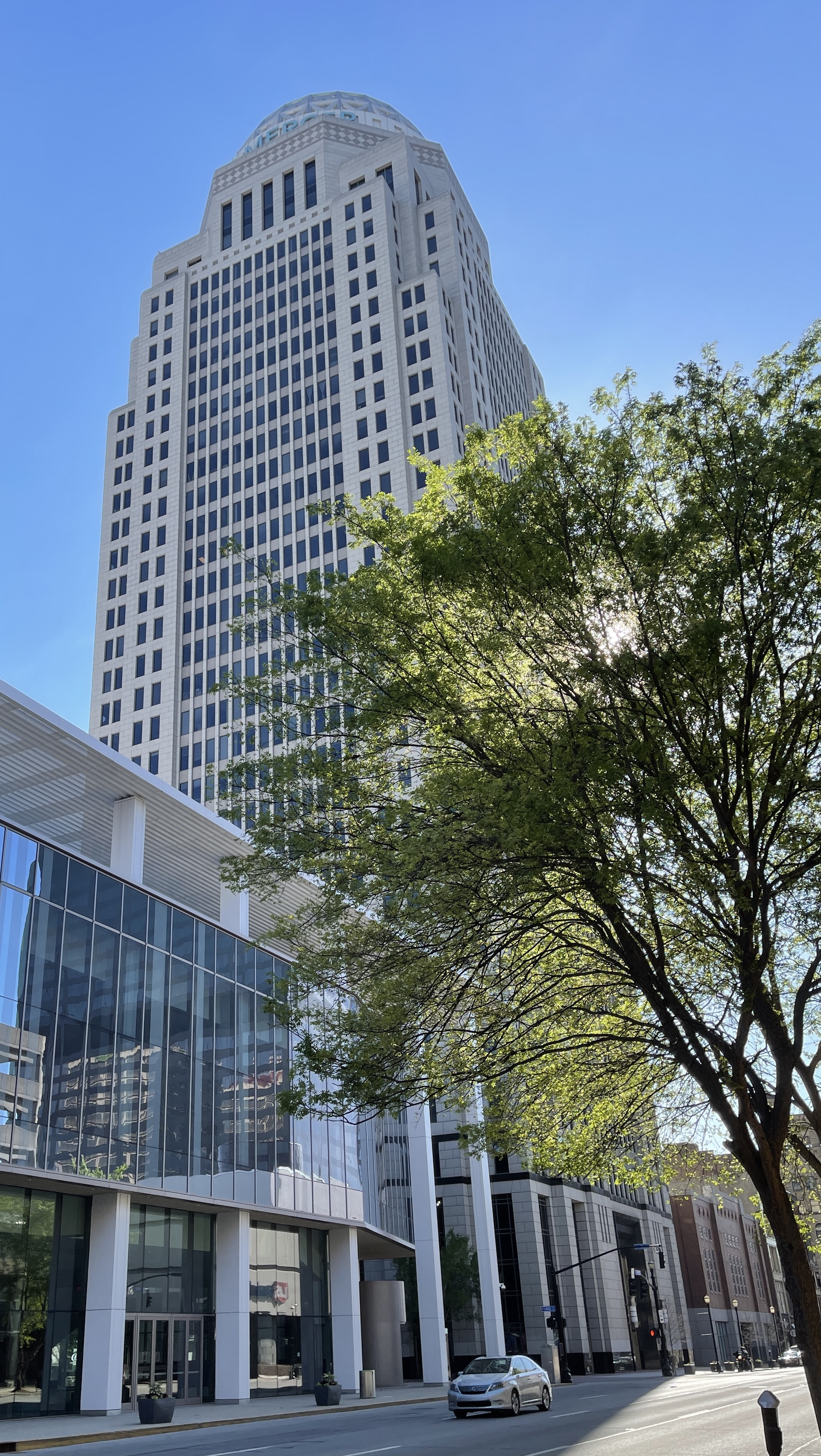
View of 400 West Market building from across the Kentucky convention center

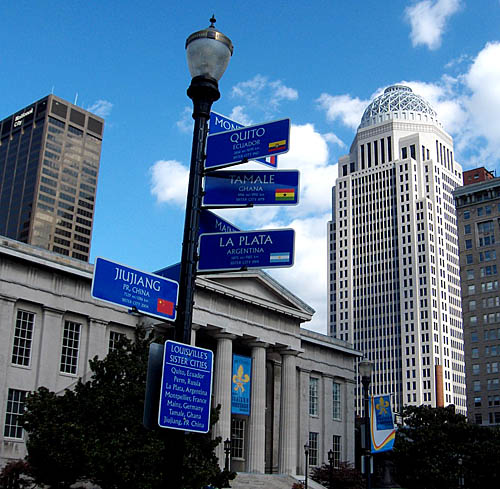

== See also ==
- Commonwealth Building
- List of tallest buildings by U.S. state and territory
- List of tallest buildings in Louisville

Records
Preceded by National City Tower	Tallest building in Kentucky; 1993–present	Succeeded by Current holder
