= Commonwealth Building (Louisville) =

Building in Louisville, Kentucky, USA

Coordinates: 38.2467°N 85.7587°W

- Interactive map of the Commonwealth Building area

General information
- Status: Demolished
- Location: Fourth St and Broadway; Downtown Louisville
- Opening: 1928
- Demolished: January 16, 1994

Height
- Roof: 255-foot (78 m)

Technical details
- Floor count: 21

Design and construction
- Developer: James Graham Brown

The Commonwealth Building was a 21-story, 255-foot (78 m) building in Downtown Louisville, Kentucky located on the northwestern corner of Fourth Street and Broadway.

The Commonwealth Building was built by James Graham Brown across Fourth Street from the Brown Hotel in 1928 and originally named after his late brother, Martin Brown. In 1955, a 17-story vertical addition was constructed which took the title of Louisville's tallest building away from the Heyburn Building, diagonally across Fourth and Broadway. The building featured a light beacon on its roof for a short time until being turned off due to complaints by residents in Floyds Knobs, Indiana.

The owner of the building, Commonwealth Life Insurance Company, created Capital Holding Corporation in 1969 and, as the company grew, decided to build a new headquarters building on the southwest corner of Fourth and Market named Capital Holding Center to reflect the company's business interests outside of life insurance. Once Commonwealth Life Insurance Company and Capital Holding relocated to their new headquarters, the Commonwealth Building was imploded on January 16, 1994. A low rise office building and open space now occupy the building's former site.

Preceded by Heyburn Building	Tallest building in Kentucky; 1955–1963	Succeeded by The 800 Apartments
