= Kentucky Home Life Building =

- Inter-Southern Insurance Building
- U.S. National Register of Historic Places
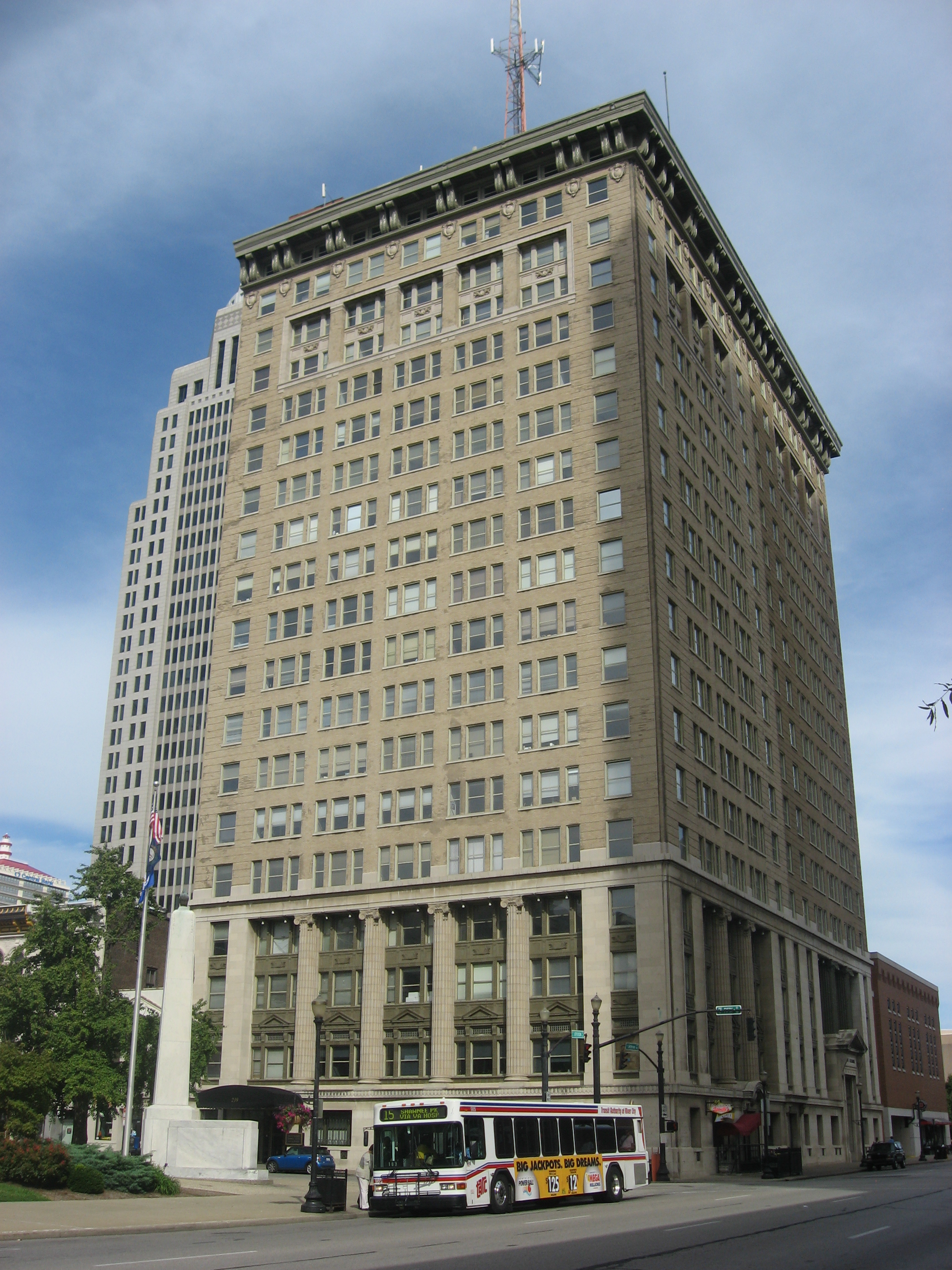
- Interactive map of Inter-Southern Insurance Building
- Location: 239 South 5th St. Louisville, Kentucky 40202
- Coordinates: 38.25419°N 85.75847°W
- Built: 1912
- Architect: Brinton B. Davis (original building); D.X. Murphy & Brother (1922 addition)
- Architectural style: Neoclassical
- NRHP reference No.: 80001605
- Added to NRHP: March 19, 1980

The Kentucky Home Life Building, formerly the Inter-Southern Life Insurance Building, is a 20-floor, 235-foot (72-m) building in downtown Louisville, Kentucky, United States. It was the tallest building in Louisville until the construction of the Heyburn Building in 1927. The Kentucky Home Life Building was added to the National Register of Historic Places in 1980.

The building has historically housed office space for lawyers, accountants and other professionals. It sits at the corner of 5th and Jefferson streets – across from Louisville Metro Hall and close to many other city government and private offices – and contains more than 274,000 square feet of office space.

In April 2026, after more than a year of foreclosure proceedings, the vacant building sold at auction for $4.67 million. An appraisal ahead of the auction valued the tower at $7 million, finding it in poor condition. Developers had previously proposed mixed-use renovations for the property.

== History ==
The original western structure, built in 1912 at a cost of $750,000, was devised by architect Brinton B. Davis, known for numerous other historic buildings in Kentucky, including Louisville Gardens (then the Jefferson County Armory) and many of the structures on the campus of Western Kentucky University in Bowling Green.

A matching addition to the building was constructed a decade later, in 1922, designed by the firm D.X. Murphy & Brother, now Luckett & Farley. The building's nomination to the NRHP lauded this addition as containing "one of the most striking interiors in the city."

The building was originally named for the Inter-Southern Life Insurance Co., which was headquartered in the building until the company's demise amid the market crash of 1929. The building was later occupied by the Kentucky Home Mutual Life Insurance Co., for which it was renamed.

One architectural highlight of the building is in the first-floor banking room, which touts classical features. According to the NRHP entry: "The former Citizens Fidelity banking room is based on the Roman Baths of Caracalla. The room is three stories in height. Large fluted Corinthian columns support an entablature. A broad coffered barrel vault is pierced by lunettes with windows."

Following a change in ownership in the 1980s, investors spent more than $4 million on renovations in the building. Like many of downtown Louisville's historic office towers, the Kentucky Home Life Building has struggled with low occupancy rates. In 1992, more than one-third of the building was unoccupied, a figure that grew over time. Following the onset of the COVID-19 pandemic and subsequent prevalence of remote work, the Kentucky Home Life Building was "possibly the largest vacant structure in downtown Louisville."

In July 2024, law enforcement raided the building and removed alleged trespassers following reports of theft of wiring and other materials. Attempted metal theft from the building resulted in a "major gas leak" in the area, officials said, after thieves reportedly cut into the building's utility lines. Some street-facing doors and windows were boarded up with plywood after the incident. A law enforcement official involved in the sweep described the inside of the building as being "in complete disarray. It is nasty. There's no other way to put it".

== Renovation plans ==
In 2021, the Kentucky Home Life Building sold for $15 million to KHLB Properties, which planned to redevelop the building for mixed use, including a hotel, apartments and retail. In August 2025, a mixed-use renovation proposal for the building was named a finalist for funding through a downtown building conversion program.

== See also ==
- List of tallest buildings in Louisville
