= Kentucky Towers =

Coordinates: 38°15′4″N 85°45′32″W

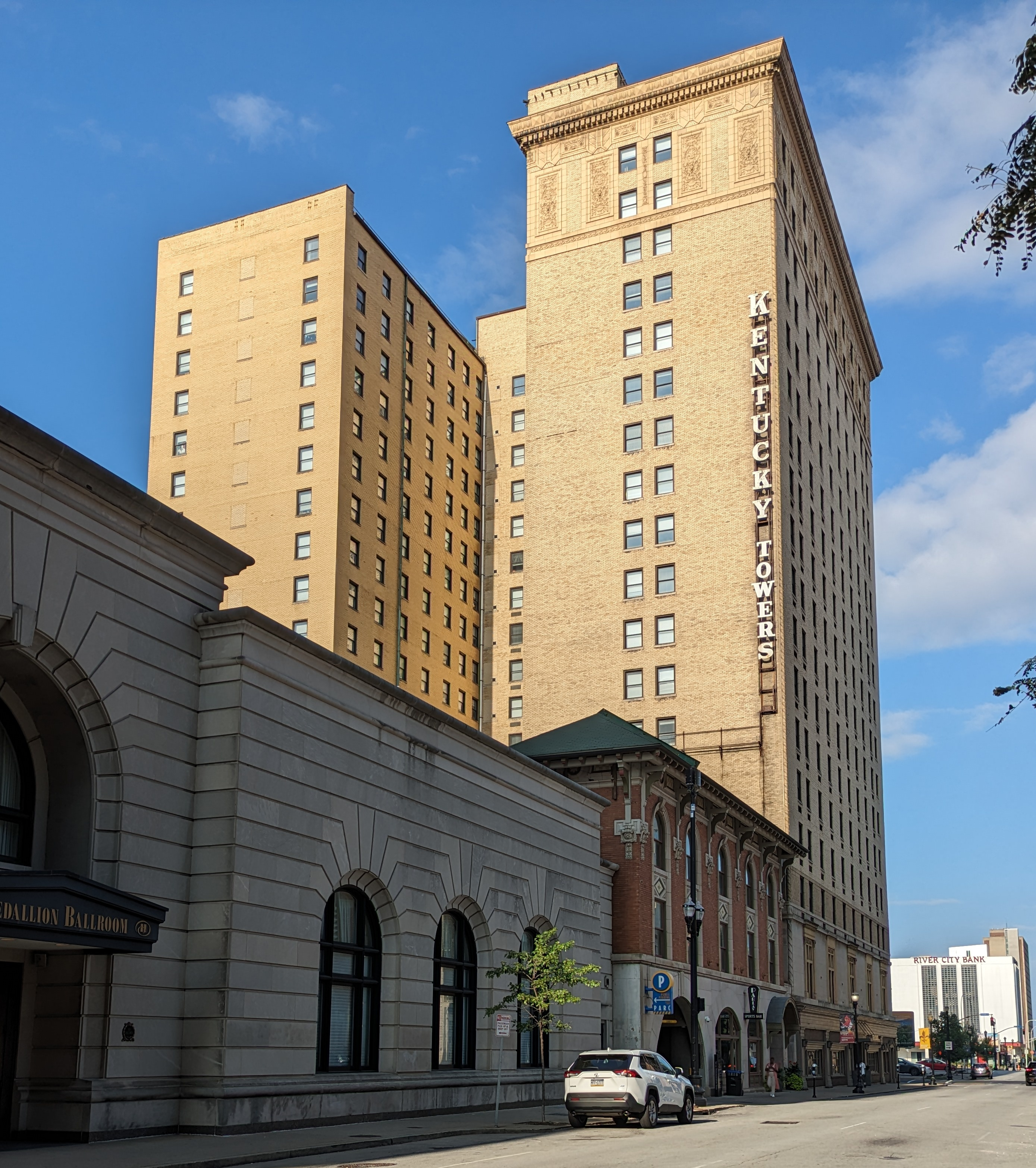
Kentucky Towers

Kentucky Towers is a historic apartment building located in Downtown Louisville, Kentucky, USA, at 430 W Muhammad Ali Blvd.

== History ==
The building was first built in 1925 on the corner of Fifth and Walnut streets as the Kentucky Hotel. It was the last hotel built in Downtown Louisville before World War Two. The late 1960s experienced a large growth in new apartment construction throughout the United States. At the same time, some buildings were converted into apartment buildings, and in 1972 the Kentucky Hotel was converted to an apartment building and renamed the Kentucky Towers. In 1978, the Louisville Board of Aldermen voted 6–5 to rename Walnut Street to Muhammad Ali Boulevard. In 1997, Kentucky Towers was the largest residential building in Downtown Louisville.

Other historic downtown buildings are in close proximity. To the east is the Seelbach Hotel, and directly across Muhammad Ali Boulevard, to the north, is the Republic Building and the Cathedral of the Assumption.

== Building ==
The building is 19 stories and includes 285 apartments. As of 1997, the swimming pool on the roof of the seventh floor was the highest swimming pool in the State of Kentucky.

In 2005, the building was purchased for $7.65 million by a New York City investor Aaron Parnes. In April 2010, PMR Companies, a local management company, began managing the building. In 2019, the building sold for $17.7 million to a New York-based firm. As of 2024, the building was managed by AMP Residential, leasing apartments under the branding of the Flats on Fifth.

== Notable inhabitants ==
- Maria Siemionow, Polish-American surgeon who performed the first face transplant

== See also ==
- List of tallest buildings in Louisville
