= Galt House =

Hotel in Louisville, Kentucky

The Galt House Hotel
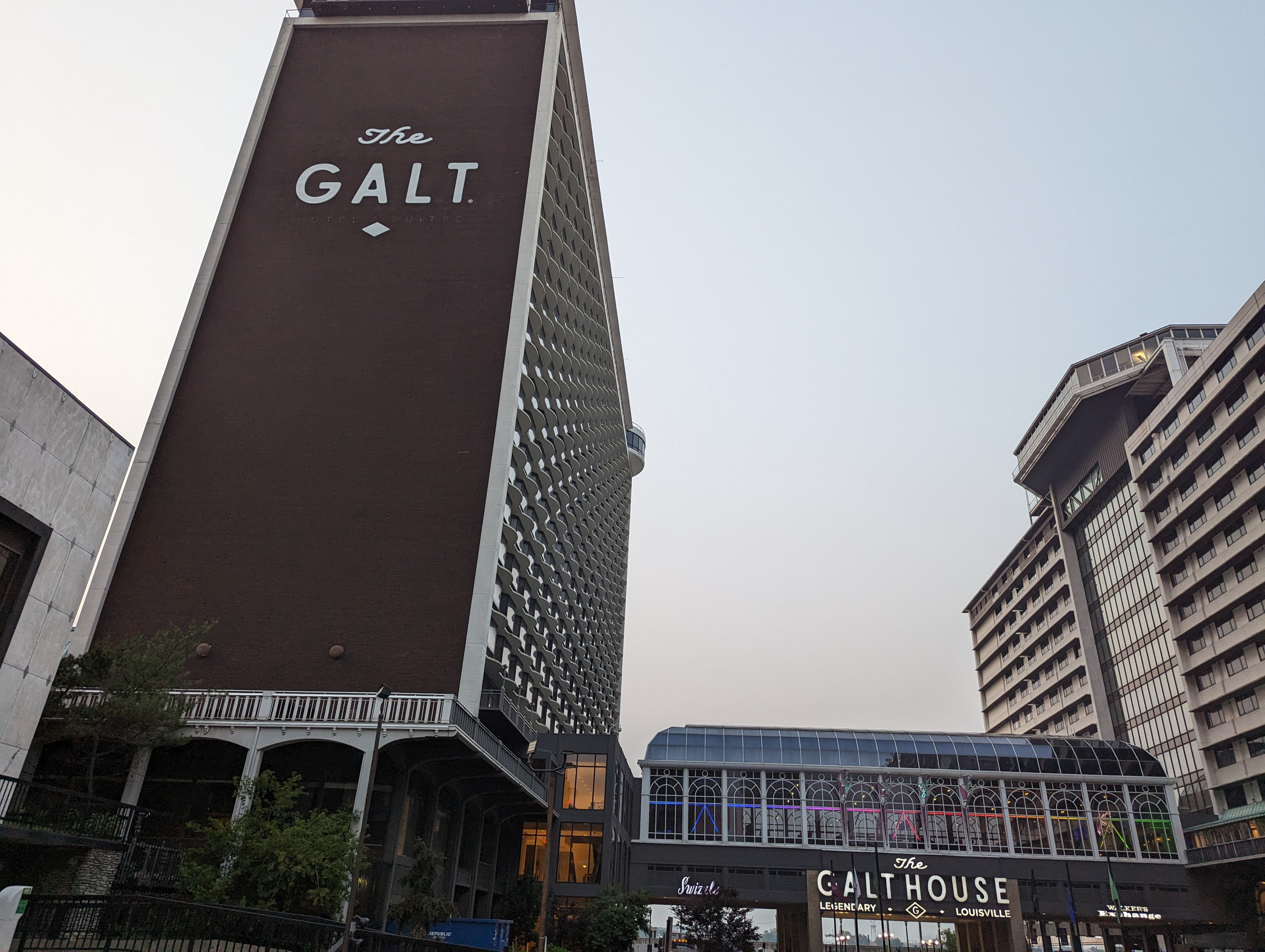
- The Galt House stands on Fourth Street, by the Ohio River.
- Interactive map of the The Galt House Hotel area

General information
- Location: 140 North 4th Street; Louisville, Kentucky 40202
- Coordinates: 38.25797°N 85.75690°W
- Opening: 1835 (first hotel); 1869 (second hotel); 1972 (current hotel); 2020 (renovation)
- Owner: Al J. Schneider Co.

Technical details
- Floor count: 25

Other information
- Number of rooms: 1,310
- Number of restaurants: 6

Website
- galthouse.com

The Galt House Hotel is a 25-story, 1,310-room hotel in Louisville, Kentucky, established in 1972. It is named for two consecutive nearby historic hotels, both named Galt House, erected in 1835 and 1869; the first was destroyed by fire in 1865, and the second, demolished in 1921. The Galt House is the city's only hotel on the Ohio River.

== Original Galt House (first and second hotels) ==
The namesake for the Galt House was, in the early 19th century, the residence of Dr. William Craig Galt. The house was located at the corner of Second and Main Street.

In 1835, the first Galt House, a 60-room hotel constructed on land purchased from Galt at the northeast corner of Second and Main, was opened by Col. Ariss Throckmorton. During the nineteenth century, the Galt House was acclaimed as Louisville's finest hotel. Novelist Charles Dickens was an especially noted guest of this original Galt House, which he called "a splendid hotel" where he was "handsomely lodged as though we had been in Paris, rather than hundreds of miles beyond the Alleghenies".

During the Civil War, the Galt House was utilized for meetings of Union generals. In September 1862, it was the scene of an unusual murder, when General Jefferson C. Davis (not to be confused with Confederate President Jefferson Davis) shot Union General William "Bull" Nelson after a dispute.

According to a historical marker for the original Galt House, in March 1864, Generals Ulysses S. Grant and William Tecumseh Sherman met at the Galt House to plan the invasion that led to the successful capture of Atlanta, Georgia, and Sherman's March to the Sea. As of 2014, this claim has fallen into dispute.

The first Galt House structure burned down in 1865. Four years later, in 1869, a larger Galt House designed by Henry Whitestone was established nearby, on the corner of First and Main streets. Known as the center of Louisville's social life during this time, noted guests included presidents Ulysses S. Grant and Theodore Roosevelt as well as Grand Duke Alexis of Russia. The hotel closed in 1919 due to financial difficulties and was demolished in 1921 to be replaced by a new headquarters building for the Belknap Hardware and Manufacturing Company, now known as the Waterside Building.

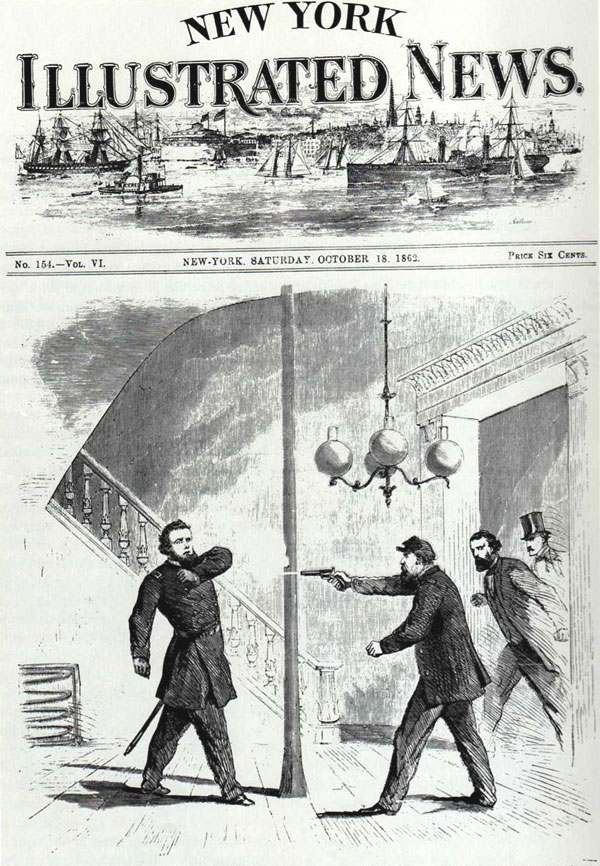
Union Gen. Jefferson C. Davis shoots Union Gen. William "Bull" Nelson at the first Galt House in 1862.

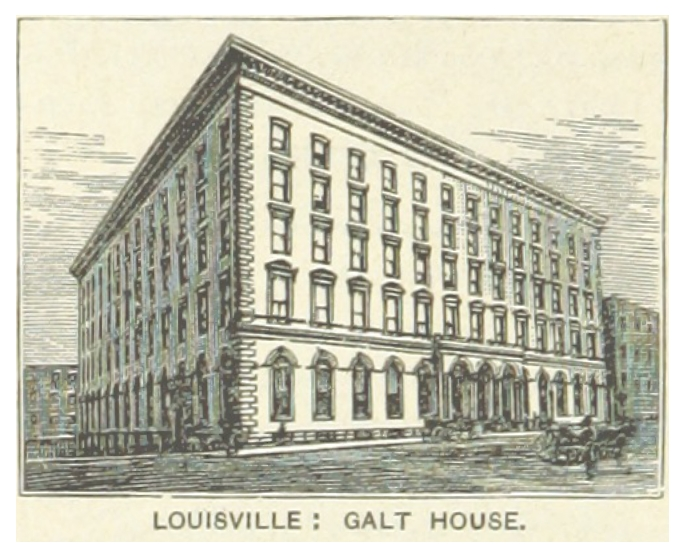
The second Galt House in 1891

== Current Galt House ==
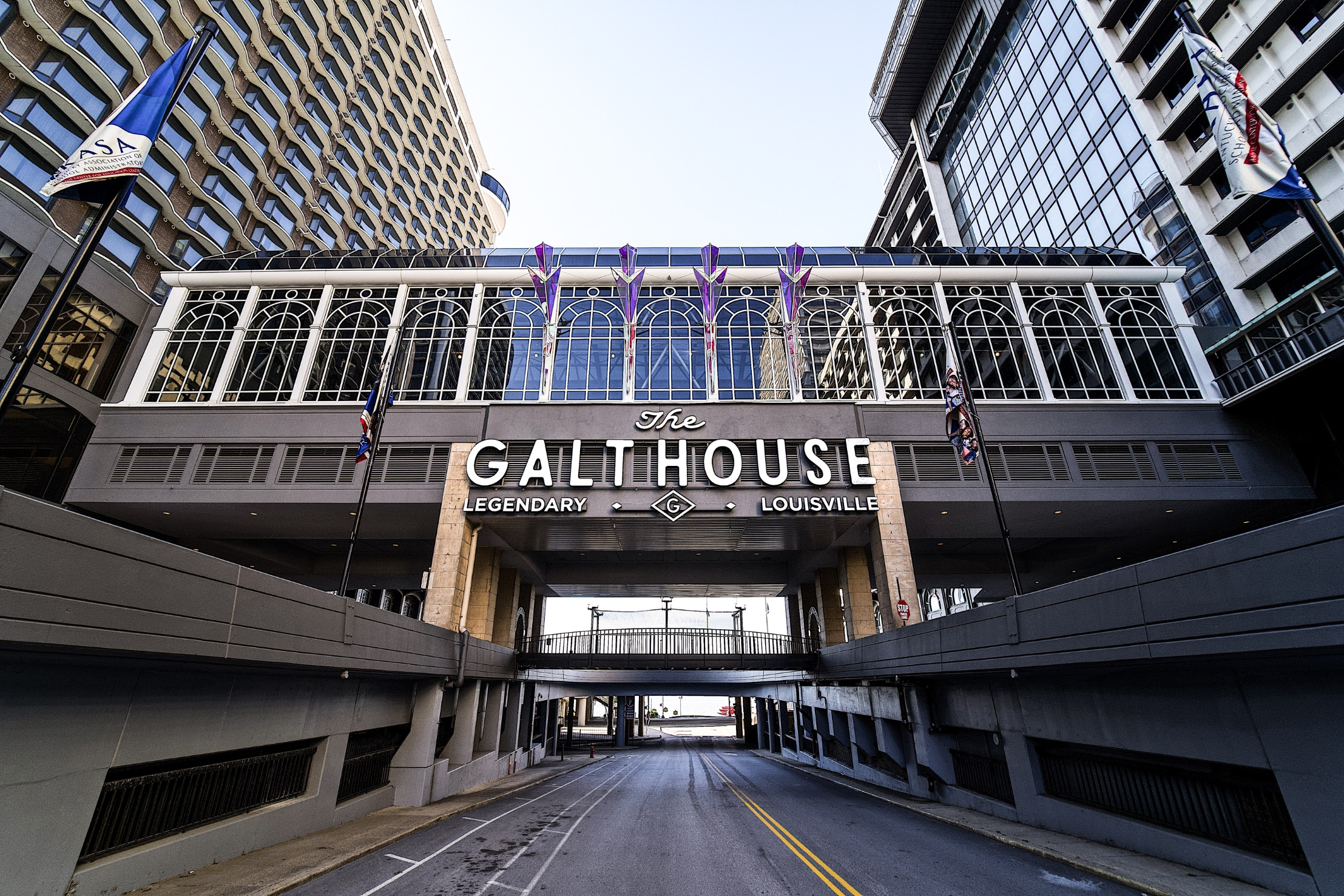
The Galt House, 2020

Over a half a century later, in 1972, the Galt House Hotel was re-established by developer Al J. Schneider as part of Louisville's Riverfront Urban Renewal Project. The West Tower is 25 stories high and features 130,000 square feet of meeting space, deluxe guest rooms, corner suites, and six restaurants – Walker's Exchange, Jockey Silks Bourbon Bar, Down One Bourbon Bar, Al J's, Thelma's, and Swizzle Dinner & Drinks restaurant on the 25th floor, which opened in spring 2020. An East Tower was added in 1984. It offers 650 suites, including waterfront balcony suites and waterfront apartments. With 1,310 guest rooms, the Galt House Hotel is the largest in Kentucky. It has 130,000 square feet of meeting space, including more than 50 meeting rooms, two ballrooms and an exhibit hall. Other amenities include a fitness center on the top floor of the East Tower, a business and shipping center, a spa and salon, a barbershop, retail shops, and Down One Bourbon Bar. The East and West Towers are connected by a three-story glass enclosed Conservatory, which features Thelma's Deli (named for founder Al J. Schneider's wife, Thelma French Schneider), Al J's Lounge, and indoor seating.

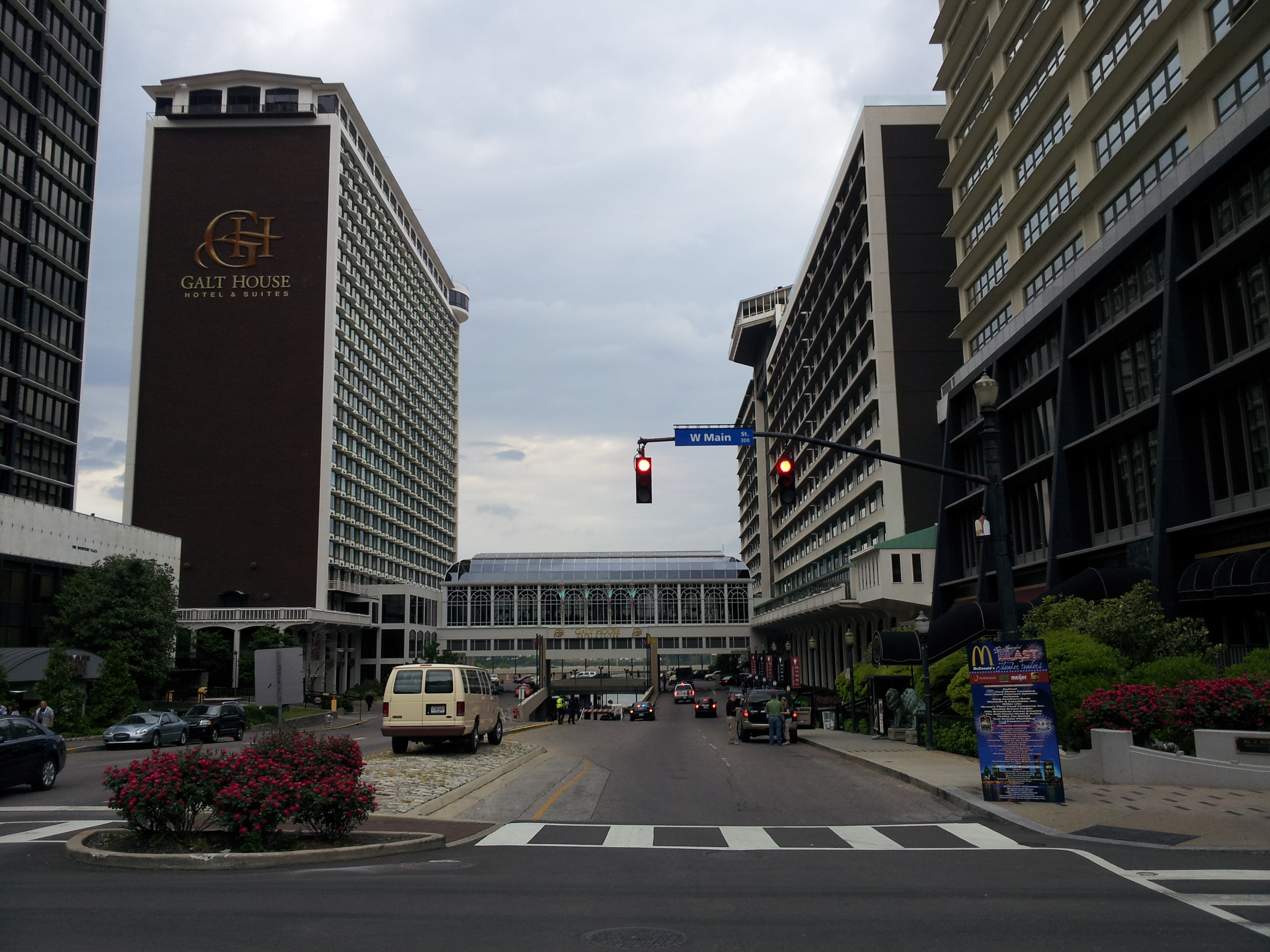
The Galt House, 2012 (pre-renovation)

The Galt House Hotel is the Official Hotel of Churchill Downs, the Kentucky Derby, the Kentucky Oaks, the Kentucky Derby Festival (hosting the command center of its kickoff event, Thunder Over Louisville), and the KFC Yum! Center. It also hosts the Kentucky State Governor's Cup academic competition every year. Area residents enlisting in the US military through the Louisville United States Military Entrance Processing Command station (Louisville MEPS) are often given a chance to stay at the hotel for free the night before their early-morning military medical exam.

On August 21, 2019, U.S. President Donald Trump visited the Galt House to deliver the keynote address at AMVETS 75th National Convention. At the end of the speech the president signed a presidential memorandum, directing the United States Department of Education to forgive all student debt incurred by disabled military veterans.

== See also ==
- Brown Hotel
- History of Louisville, Kentucky
- List of attractions and events in the Louisville metropolitan area
- List of tallest buildings in Louisville
- Louisville in the American Civil War
- Riverfront Plaza/Belvedere
- Seelbach Hotel
