= Humana Building =

1985 skyscraper in downtown Louisville, Kentucky, located at 500 West Main Street

Coordinates: 38°15′23.35″N 85°45′31.28″W

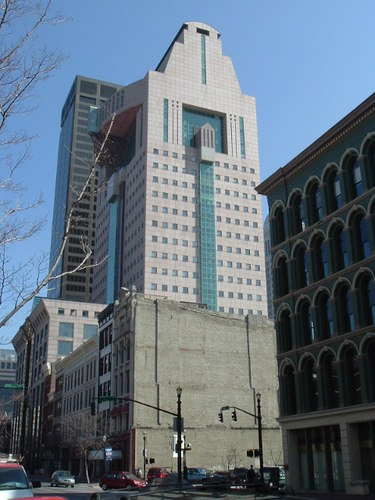
Viewed from 6th and Main

The Humana Building, also known as the Humana Tower, is a 1985 skyscraper in downtown Louisville, Kentucky, located at 500 West Main Street and is the former headquarters of the Humana Corporation.

== Description ==
The 26-story structure is headquarters of the Humana Corporation, and was designed by the Driehaus Prize winner and New Classical architect Michael Graves. Construction began in October 1982 and was completed in May 1985.

Each side of the building is designed slightly differently, up to a sloping pyramid style for the upper few floors. The building is also known for its exterior construction of flat pink granite. The north facade's loggia is respectful of the older downtown architecture, being flush with the original Main Street storefronts. The open-air front portion of the loggia contains a large fountain. The large, curved portion towards the top of the building is an open-air observation deck. The outermost point of the circle has space for a few people at a time to be surrounded by glass, allowing for views of the Ohio River and Main Street.

At the site of the Humana Building previously stood the six-story Kenyon Building, which was the first skyscraper in Louisville. Completed in 1886, that building was razed in 1974.

In February 2024, Humana announced it would vacate the building in a cost-cutting move, and that it would attempt to sell the building a year later.

On February 3, 2026, after the building was sold, Louisville mayor Craig Greenberg announced that the building would be turned into a 1,000-room convention center hotel.

== Awards ==
The American Institute of Architects awarded the Humana Building the National Honor Award in 1987. Time magazine listed it as one of the ten best buildings of the 1980s.

== See also ==
- List of tallest buildings in Louisville
