= 500 West Jefferson =

Skyscraper in Downtown, Louisville, Kentucky

Coordinates: 38°15′13″N 85°45′32″W

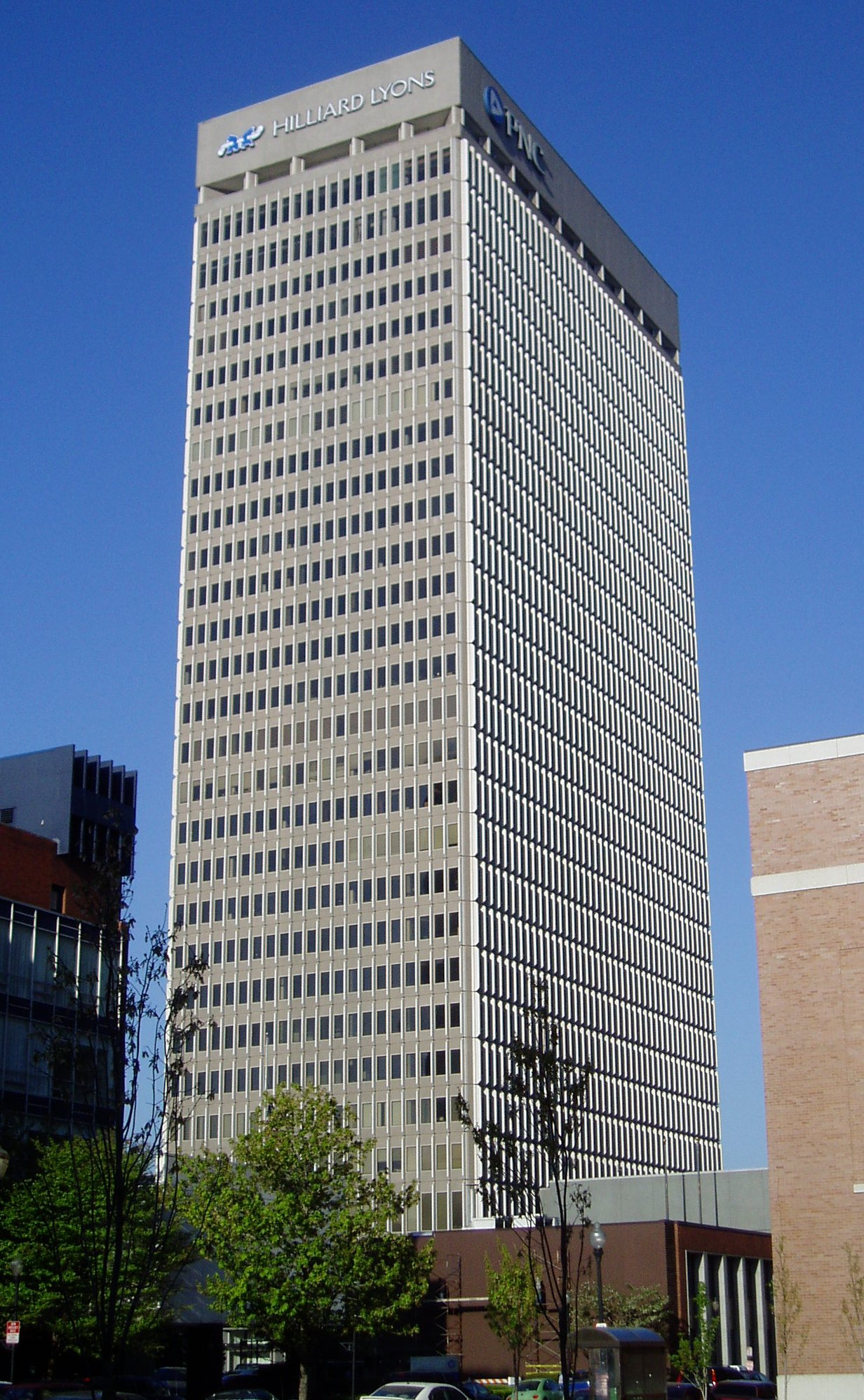
- Interactive map of the 500 West Jefferson area

General information
- Status: Completed
- Type: Office
- Location: 500 West Jefferson St; Downtown Louisville
- Opening: 1971

Height
- Roof: 420-foot (128 m)

Technical details
- Floor count: 31

Design and construction
- Architect: Welton Becket
- Main contractor: Charles Pankow Builders, Ltd.

500 West Jefferson, previously known as PNC Plaza for several decades until renamed in 2020, and now also called 500W or 500 West by its owners, is a skyscraper in Downtown, Louisville, Kentucky and located at 500 West Jefferson Street. Previously owned by Pittsburgh-based PNC Bank and currently owned by SomeraRoad Inc., the 31-story, 420-foot (128 m) high structure was designed by architect Welton Becket and was completed in 1971. A notable feature of the building is the pattern of pre-cast concrete panels on the exterior of its windows. The building, originally named Citizens Fidelity Plaza, was named after Citizens Fidelity Bank and renamed PNC Plaza when Citizens Fidelity was acquired by PNC Bank.

It was the tallest building in the state of Kentucky when it was completed in 1971, but lost that distinction a year later when National City Tower was completed in 1972. PNC now has offices in both buildings due to its own acquisition of National City Corp. in an unrelated move, however, it does not own National City Tower.

The Jefferson Club, a private city club, was located on the top floor of the building, until closing in February 2010.

The building was purchased by Optima International, a firm based in Miami and run by Chaim Schochet, for a $77 million cash and mortgage assumption deal that closed on September 21, 2011.

In 2019, Milwaukee-based financial services firm Baird purchased Louisville financial services firm Hilliard Lyons and became the anchor tenant, renovating and moving workers to the top five floors.

In August 2020, Federal prosecutors filed a lawsuit claiming that the Ukrainian owners were laundering billions of dollars over more than ten years.

In November 2020, the New York–based private equity firm SomeraRoad bought the tower for $22.5 million, renamed it to "500W", and began renovation plans. Vice President of SomeraRoad Andrew Marchetti said "What we're doing is going to change the trajectory of 500 West. And it'll be noticeable," saying the company hopes to attract new tenants with these amenities and updates. Spending $16 million, changes include a new entrance and lobby, a tenant lounge, a conference center, and fitness center. Ev's Deli is currently the only café or restaurant in the building. In September 2022, Tennessee-based Barista Parlor announced that it planned to open a new location in the atrium of the building, but did not say when that would happen.

== See also ==
- List of tallest buildings in Louisville

Preceded by The 800 Apartments	Tallest Building in Kentucky; 1971–1972	Succeeded by National City Tower
