= Brown Hotel =

- Brown Hotel Building and Theater
- U.S. National Register of Historic Places
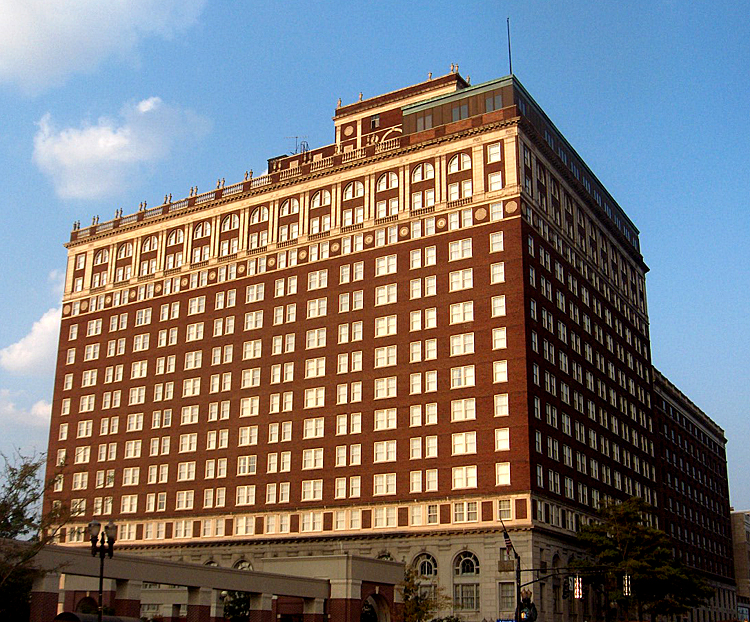
- Location: 335 W Broadway; Louisville, Kentucky 40202
- Coordinates: 38°14′47.76″N 85°45′28.09″W
- Area: Downtown Louisville, KY
- Built: 1923
- Architect: Preston J. Bradshaw
- Architectural style: Colonial Revival
- Website: brownhotel.com
- NRHP reference No.: 78001346
- Added to NRHP: February 17, 1978

The Brown Hotel is a historic 16-story hotel in downtown Louisville, Kentucky, U.S., located on the corner of Fourth and Broadway. It contains 294 rooms and over 24,000 ft^{2} of meeting space. It also contains special amenities, such as a fitness center and three restaurants. It is listed in the National Register of Historic Places. The Brown Hotel is a member of Historic Hotels of America, the official program of the National Trust for Historic Preservation.

== History ==
The hotel which featured 600 rooms, ballrooms, shoppes, meeting rooms, and restaurants, was designed by Preston J. Bradshaw and opened in 1923, only 10 months after construction began. The hotel cost $4 million, and was funded and owned by James Graham Brown, a local entrepreneur who wanted to compete with The Seelbach Hotel just a few blocks down the street. The hotel quickly became a central part of the growing downtown Louisville economy and the social lives of the locals.

In 1926 the hotel chef Fred K. Schmidt introduced the Hot Brown sandwich, consisting of an open-faced turkey sandwich with bacon with a delicate Mornay sauce. The Hot Brown became rather popular among locals and visitors alike. The sandwich has been featured in various programs about regional cuisine, such as the 2002 PBS documentary Sandwiches That You Will Like and a 2011 episode of the Travel Channel's Man v. Food.

Many famous people have visited the hotel in the past and present. David Lloyd George, former Prime Minister of the United Kingdom, was the first person to sign the guest register, and Queen Marie of Romania also visited. The famous soprano Lily Pons was allowed to bring her pet lion along with her, and it roamed free in her room. Actor Victor Mature was an elevator operator at the hotel before becoming famous; he lost his job after abandoning his post at the elevator and leaving a simple note so that he could go dance with a girl during one of the hotel's many roof-top parties.

The Broadway entrance to the Brown Hotel.

James Winkfield, a Black jockey who won two Kentucky Derbies, was refused admittance at the front door in 1961.

The combination of Prohibition and the Great Depression led to hard times for the hotel in the early 1930s. The Brown defaulted on its loan, and the bank threatened foreclosure. Employees were asked to work for periods without pay, and the Brown was only able to stay open due to the employees' willingness to do so.

When the 1937 Flood hit Louisville, the Brown's first floor was flooded. Although there was no electricity, the hotel stayed open, and many people whose homes were submerged stayed at the hotel. One resident recalled: "We were rowing down Broadway and there was The Brown Hotel. The doors were open and the place was filled with water so we just rowed our boat in one door, went through the lobby and rowed out another." Elmer H. Weck, a bell captain of the hotel at this time, is recorded to have caught a two-pound fish in the lobby. The fish was later mounted and hung in the hotel lobby for a number of years. WAVE radio, located on the 15th floor, was the only radio station to remain in operation in its own facilities during the flood.

Like much of the rest of the nation, economic recovery began in the buildup to World War II. Thousands of soldiers passing through from Fort Knox would stay in the area, and the hotel would frequently be filled to capacity. The week of the Kentucky Derby was and still is the most successful week of every year; celebrities such as The Duke of Windsor, Harry Truman, Elizabeth Taylor, Joan Crawford, Gene Autry, Eva Marie Saint, and Muhammad Ali have stayed here during this time.

As the city declined in the 1960s and 1970s, the fortunes of The Brown declined as well. Though $1.5 million was spent in 1965 to modernize the Brown and another downtown hotel, attendance remained low. Then on March 20, 1969, James Graham Brown died, leading to the further decline of the hotel, and in 1971, after financial shortfalls, The Brown closed. The building was sold to the Louisville Public Schools and became the headquarters for the city school system. When Louisville and Jefferson County schools merged in 1975 the new school system used the county schools' VanHoose Education Center as its headquarters and the Brown Education Center housed other school administrative offices.

The city of Louisville began to make many moves to revitalize the downtown area in the 1980s. As part of this project the "Broadway Group" was formed, which acquired The Brown from Jefferson County Public Schools and began its renovation in 1983. The schools took a toll on the building, but the grand public rooms were spared and were able to be saved. The Brown was then restored and reopened as a Hilton Hotel. In 1993, the hotel was purchased by the Camberley Hotel Company, which furthered the restoration and returned the hotel to its former glory, although the once two-story Bluegrass Room became a single-story room with three other meeting rooms overhead. Another alteration made to the hotel was the demolition of the dividing wall in every other room, thus doubling the size of each guest room and taking the hotel from 600 guest rooms to its present 294. After the restorations and alterations were completed, Camberley sold the hotel to its present owner, 1859 Historic Hotels LTD, based in Galveston, Texas, in 2006.

== In popular culture ==
The Brown served as location for numerous scenes in the 2005 film Elizabethtown, directed by Cameron Crowe.

== See also ==
- List of Historic Hotels of America
- Galt House
- History of Louisville, Kentucky
- List of attractions and events in the Louisville metropolitan area
- List of tallest buildings in Louisville
- Louisville Clock, formerly at Theatre Square (dismantled in 2015)
- National Register of Historic Places listings in Downtown Louisville, Kentucky
- Seelbach Hotel
