= Louisville Public Library (disambiguation) =

Louisville Public Library may refer to:

- Louisville Public Library, a branch of the Jefferson County Library System, in Georgia (U.S. state)
- Louisville Free Public Library, in Louisville, Kentucky
  - Louisville Main Library, in Louisville, Kentucky
  - Louisville Free Public Library, Crescent Hill Branch, in Louisville, Kentucky
  - Louisville Free Public Library, Western Branch, in Louisville, Kentucky
- Louisville Public Library, in Louisville, Ohio
