= Louisville Main Library =

Historic library building in Louisville, Kentucky

- Louisville Free Public Library
- U.S. National Register of Historic Places
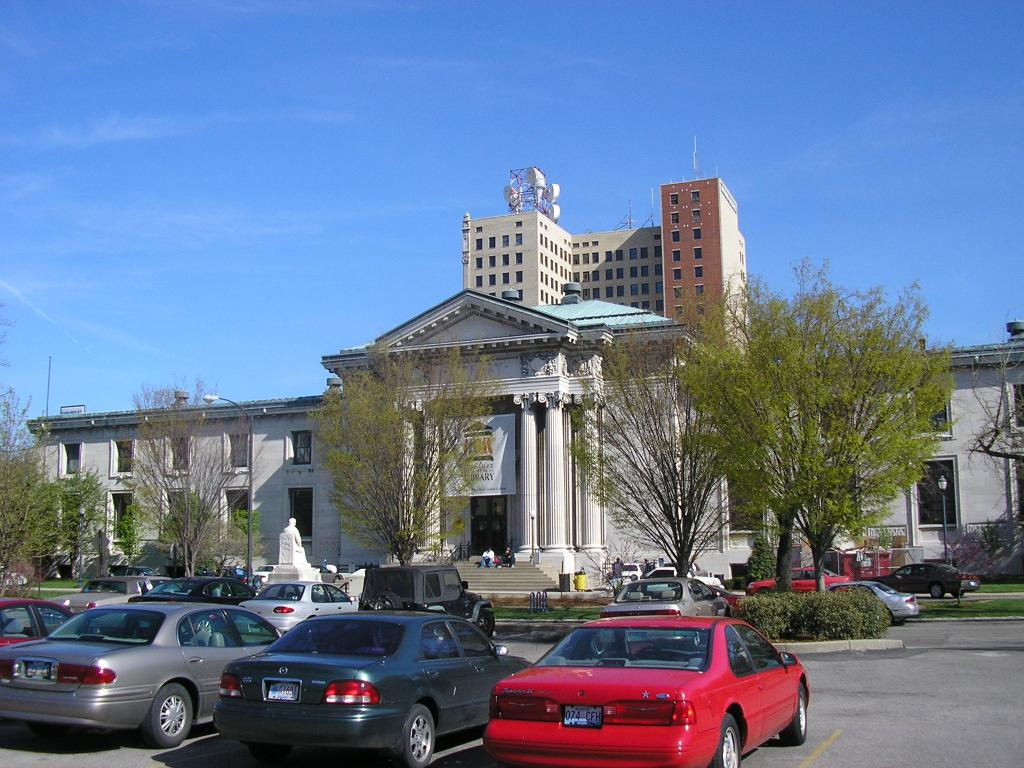
- The 1906 Carnegie building (South Building) on York Street
- Location: 301 W. York St., Louisville, Kentucky
- Coordinates: 38°14′39.98″N 85°45′28.23″W
- Area: 2.2 acres (0.89 ha)
- Built: 1906
- Architect: Pilcher and Tachau
- Architectural style: Beaux Arts
- NRHP reference No.: 80001608
- Added to NRHP: March 27, 1980

The Louisville Main Library is the main branch of the Louisville Free Public Library (LFPL), the largest public library system in Kentucky. Located at Fourth and York streets in SoBro, adjacent to downtown Louisville, the building comprises a 1906 Carnegie library designed by Pilcher and Tachau in the Beaux-Arts style (the South Building) and a 1969 addition by Louis and Henry Architects (the North Building). It was listed on the National Register of Historic Places on March 27, 1980.

== South Building (1906) ==
=== Design and construction ===
The Louisville Free Public Library was established in 1902 by an act of the Kentucky State Legislature and merged with the Polytechnic Society of Kentucky in 1904. With the promise of a grant from philanthropist Andrew Carnegie, acquired through the efforts of Louisville's Scottish Society, construction of a permanent building at the York Street site began in 1905. The building was designed by the New York City firm of Pilcher and Tachau (the latter, William S. Tachau, was a native Louisvillian) and completed in 1906, though construction worker strikes delayed the opening of patron services until 1908.

The building is considered one of the finest examples of Beaux-Arts architecture in Kentucky. The main entrance leads to the Delivery Room (now the foyer), a two-story space in the Louis XVI style featuring a stained-glass barrel vaulted ceiling, white marble columns, neo-Renaissance murals by Theodore L. Wilberg, and two staircases with bronze and iron railings. The building's open stack room, which allowed patrons direct access to the shelves rather than requesting books from a closed collection, was an innovation at the time and proved a popular feature upon opening.

=== Collections and museum ===
In addition to its book collection, the library originally housed a natural history museum in its basement (open to the public from 1908), an armory containing Daniel Boone's rifle along with medieval weapons and armor, collections of American Indian weapons and beads, and numerous paintings, drawings, etchings, and sculptures. The building was also the first local home of Tchaenhotep, an Egyptian mummy purchased by Lt. Governor Samuel Thruston Ballard after the 1904 St. Louis World's Fair and placed on display at the library. The natural history collections were relocated in 1971 to what is now the Kentucky Science Center.

A bronze statue of Abraham Lincoln, the third and final casting of a work by sculptor George Grey Barnard, was donated by Isaac W. Bernheim and his wife Amanda and dedicated in 1922 at the west end of the building facing Fourth Street. Ida B. Tarbell, the Lincoln biographer and muckraking journalist, attended the dedication ceremony. It is a long-held tradition that rubbing Lincoln's toe brings good luck.

=== Great Flood of 1937 ===
Along with 70 percent of Louisville, the library and its collections were submerged during the Great Flood of 1937, with floodwaters reaching thirty feet above flood stage. Collections of rare bird eggs were crushed, artwork was endangered, taxidermy specimens and moth and butterfly collections were damaged, and the mummy Tchaenhotep was crushed under a piano. Many books were also damaged or destroyed as they swelled with water and broke the shelves and ceiling supports. The mummy was eventually restored and returned to display.

== North Building (1969) ==
In 1969, a contemporary North Building designed by Louis and Henry Architects of Louisville was added to the Carnegie structure, funded through a bond issue. The addition more than doubled the library's floor space, expanding it from 42,000 square feet (3,900 m^{2}) in the original building to a combined 152,000 square feet (14,100 m^{2}). The North Building opened on September 2, 1969, with a time capsule sealed at the dedication that November; it was unsealed fifty years later in September 2019.

The expanded facilities allowed several departments to grow, including the Audio-Visual department, the Kentucky Division, special collections of rare books, and the depository for United States government documents. The building also housed the Foundation Center and a Talking Book Library for the visually impaired.

== Flood of 2009 ==
In early August 2009, the main branch was flooded when a storm dropped 7 inches (180 mm) of rain on Louisville in approximately 70 minutes. The library's servers, bookmobiles, offices, and processing rooms were submerged under 6 feet (1.8 m) of water. Approximately 50,000 books were destroyed, and the building sustained an estimated $5 million in damage, with structural, mechanical, electrical, and computer systems near-completely damaged. The main library closed for several weeks, the first major flooding the building had experienced since 1937. Following the disaster, the Library Foundation raised nearly $2 million through the Landmark Initiative and Flood Recovery Fund for restoration, and holding cisterns were added to prevent future flood damage.

== 2024 renovation ==
In the 2020s, the Main Library underwent a major renovation exceeding $8 million, funded by American Rescue Plan funds allocated by Louisville Metro Government along with private donations to the Library Foundation. The project includes the creation of more than 16,000 square feet (1,500 m^{2}) of usable public space by opening the historic closed stacks area of the 1906 Carnegie building, a fully accessible entrance to the York Street building, and the renovation and reopening of the North Building's third floor, which had been closed to the public since 2018 due to pension-driven budget cuts. The renovated third floor will include an enhanced Kentucky History Room, the library's book collection, and study rooms.

The Main Library is the largest public library facility in Kentucky and serves as the central hub of the LFPL system. It houses more than 500,000 books and other items and welcomes over 300,000 visitors annually.

== See also ==
- Louisville Free Public Library
- Louisville Free Public Library, Western Branch
- Louisville Free Public Library, Crescent Hill Branch
- National Register of Historic Places listings in Louisville, Kentucky
