= Rachel Davis Harris =

- Born: Rachel Jewell Davis; January 10, 1869; Louisville, Kentucky, U.S.
- Died: September 22, 1969 (aged 100)
- Education: Central High School (Louisville, Kentucky)
- Occupations: librarian, activist
- Spouse: Rev. E.G. Harris (1893)
- Relatives: John Everett Harris (son) William Henry Davis(brother) John P. Davis nephew

Rachel Davis Harris (January 10, 1869 – September 22, 1969) was an American librarian and activist. She was an influential female African American director and children's librarian of the Louisville Free Public Library, Western Colored Branch, one of the first segregated libraries built in the southern United States. She promoted library outreach to youths and equitable access to library services in the black community during the Jim Crow era.

== Early years ==
Born in Louisville, Kentucky, Rachel Jewell Davis was the daughter of Susan Davis (later Susan Johnson) and Jerry Davis. She was a graduate of Central High School in 1885. In Louisville, the illiteracy rate for blacks was very high in comparison to whites: 18.7% for blacks, 1.7% for whites. With a high school degree, Harris became a member of the upper echelon of the black Louisville community. Upon graduating, she began her career as a teacher from 1885 to 1903. During this time, Davis married the Rev. Everett G. Harris, pastor of the black Plymouth Congregational Church, and they had one son.

== Career ==
The Louisville Free Public Library opened the Western Colored Branch as a result of investment made by Carnegie funds. Alongside her mentor, Thomas Fountain Blue, Harris was hired as assistant librarian of the branch in 1905. Blue's passion for providing library services to the local black community influenced Harris to also push for more outreach, as well. The two librarians were Louisville's first black public librarians, acting as pioneers in creating a new municipal service for the black community in Louisville. Both were avid leaders in southern librarianship, actively writing and publishing articles locally and nationally.

Working at the Colored Branch in Louisville, Harris gravitated toward working with youths in outreach programs. She established story times on a weekly basis, boys' and girls' clubs, and school visits to promote the library to school children. Harris also worked with school faculty in Louisville to develop classroom book collections that supported the curriculum being taught, drawing on her years working as a teacher. Her early years taught her the importance of the availability of having access to reading material outside the classroom that was both entertaining and educational along with the need for classroom collections of books.

In five years, Harris' outreach project was deemed a success. Harris' efforts had increased book circulations from 18,000 to 55,000 in her five-year tenure, allowing her to conclude:

When we look back now at the time of our beginning we see that our fears were unfounded. Our people only needed an opportunity and encouragement. The success of the branch has exceeded the hope of the most sanguine of those interested in its organization, and we feel justly proud of those results attained.

Harris' prominence in the African American community continued to rise throughout her years working at the Colored Branch. In September 1913, she was named senior assistant in charge of the newly opened Eastern Colored Branch, constructed with Carnegie funds. Alongside Blue, Harris began conducting an apprenticeship training program for individuals interested in working in libraries around the state. Many of the apprentices went on to work at the Western and Eastern Colored Branches. By 1924, 37 local black women had participated and received training from Harris and Blue. The program's success continued to reaffirm Harris' status in the Louisville African American and library communities.

Her fame allowed her to open new branches for African Americans in Roanoke, Virginia and Georgetown, Kentucky. Harris continued to work with schools to expand collections and services in Louisville and Jefferson County. By 1923, 58 classroom collections had been established in 30 school buildings with Harris' influence.

Blue died in 1935, allowing Harris to take his seat as head librarian of the Colored Branch. As head of the division, she worked with members of a Louisville community named Parkland to establish a sub-branch situated in a rented space of a private residence. In 1954, this library was replaced by a full branch in the new Cotter Homes Project. The building was named after Harris in recognition of her outreach efforts to Louisville's African American youth. Despite her retirement in 1942, Harris continued to be an avid supporter of library services in the black community in Louisville. Her knowledge encouraged many young black female librarians to be just as passionate regarding social issues and activism for local communities.

== Legacy ==
Harris had a lasting impact on children's librarianship in Louisville and across the South. Her encouragement in the Western Branch to increase youth services marked her as one of the so-called "matriarchal profession" of librarians that introduced youths to folklore, fairy tales, and stories. Harris also followed in the pattern of the librarian as an educated, middle-class woman that served her community via encouraging development by focusing on the needs of children and their education. In this way, Harris assisted in the Civil Rights Movement that spread across the nation.
