= Paul Allen Towne =

American educator and librarian

Paul Allen Towne (December 8, 1823 – August 27, 1903) was an American educator, bibliophile, editor and librarian. He was the founder of the Polytechnic Society of Kentucky.

== Librarian in Louisville ==
Two years before coming to Louisville, Towne catalogued the library of the Young Men's Association of Buffalo, New York.

The following year Towne moved and conducted teachers' institutes throughout Kentucky.

In 1872, Towne was hired by Reuben T. Durrett, as librarian of the Public Library of Kentucky, located in downtown Louisville.

In 1876, Towne founded the Polytechnic Society of Kentucky, with the help of prominent members of Louisville. The purpose of the society was to help save the library from its financial debt.

In 1877, Towne wrote for the Louisville Monthly, a magazine, where he published articles about the Public Library of Kentucky and the Polytechnic Society. He also worked as editor for the magazine.

On December 13, 1878, Towne was discharged for insubordination. The Society was dissatisfied with his management of the library and festival halls, and ordered Towne to hand over his duties to the society's treasurer, Andrew MacDonald. His discharge came after he refused to surrender the safe in his office and card-index to his catalogue of books.

Towne relocated to New York and was hired at the Astor Library, now the New York Public Library.
