= Polytechnic Society of Kentucky =

The Polytechnic Society of Kentucky was an educational, cultural and scientific organization based in downtown Louisville, Kentucky, United States. The creation of the society was to serve as a funding source for the bankrupt Public Library of Kentucky. The society operated from 1876 to 1913, when its property was given to the 1908-opened Louisville Free Public Library.

== History ==
The Public Library of Kentucky, Louisville's first free public library, opened in 1872 with Reuben T. Durrett as founder and Paul Allen Towne as librarian. It was abandoned in 1875 after a scandal involving lotteries which were meant to pay for the library. On April 30, 1875, Towne inherited the Library of Kentucky and all its assets from the board of trustees, including the Central Market Building located on 4th St.

In February 1876, Towne hosted lectures to raise money for the library. By that summer, Professor Pepper of the Polytechnic Institute of London spoke for a series of lectures with his lantern slide projector, which at the time was high technology. Several other lectures were also held by scientists and artists of Louisville. These lectures brought in hundreds of people as well as financial assistance for the library.

In December 1876, Towne invited Louisville's leading citizens to help organize a new establishment. He purposed a way that could make it profitable to re-open the library by creating a society of science, literary and art for the public. A constitution was drafted based upon the Maitland Club of Scotland. The members of the society were divided into the five academies with their own presidents, vice-presidents and secretaries. The Polytechnic Society of Kentucky was named after a lantern slide projector bought from Professor Pepper. The projector was in the room during the naming of the organization. Dr. Theodore S. Bell was elected as the first president. On April 10, 1878, the Polytechnic Society of Kentucky was chartered.

Many members of the Polytechnic had misgivings about Towne's innocence in regards to his involvement in the Public Library of Kentucky's lottery scandal. On December 13, 1878, Towne was discharged as librarian of the Polytechnic for insubordination for refusing to surrender his safe and card catalog to the council. A new council was elected in January 1879 in exchange for paying off the lingering debt left over by the Public Library of Kentucky. Rev. Dr. Stuart Robinson became president, a position he would hold until his death in October 1881. The next month, Bennett H. Young became president of the society.

The Polytechnic Society reached its peak in the mid-1880s with 715 members. In 1887, a section of the Polytechnic Society building was leased out to Kaufman-Straus department store, to increase revenues. A new building was erected and opened in 1903. The Polytechnic Society continued to operate from the fifth floor until the new location on York Street was completed in 1908.

In 1908, the new Louisville Free Public Library building opened to the public. By 1912 membership of the Polytechnic Society had decreased to 37. In 1913, after eight years of controversy, the Polytechnic Society held its last meeting and relinquished its property to the Louisville Free Public Library.

=== Librarians ===
- Paul Allen Towne, 1873–1878
- William L. Hickman, 1878–1879
- Annie Virginia Pollard, 1879–1913

=== Museum curators ===
- Philip Lee Shane (1862–1943), until his retirement due to ill health at the end of the 19th century.
- Susan Belle Shane (1858–1943), Philip's sister; curator until 1942

== See also ==
- The Filson Historical Society
