= WFPK =

Public radio station in Louisville

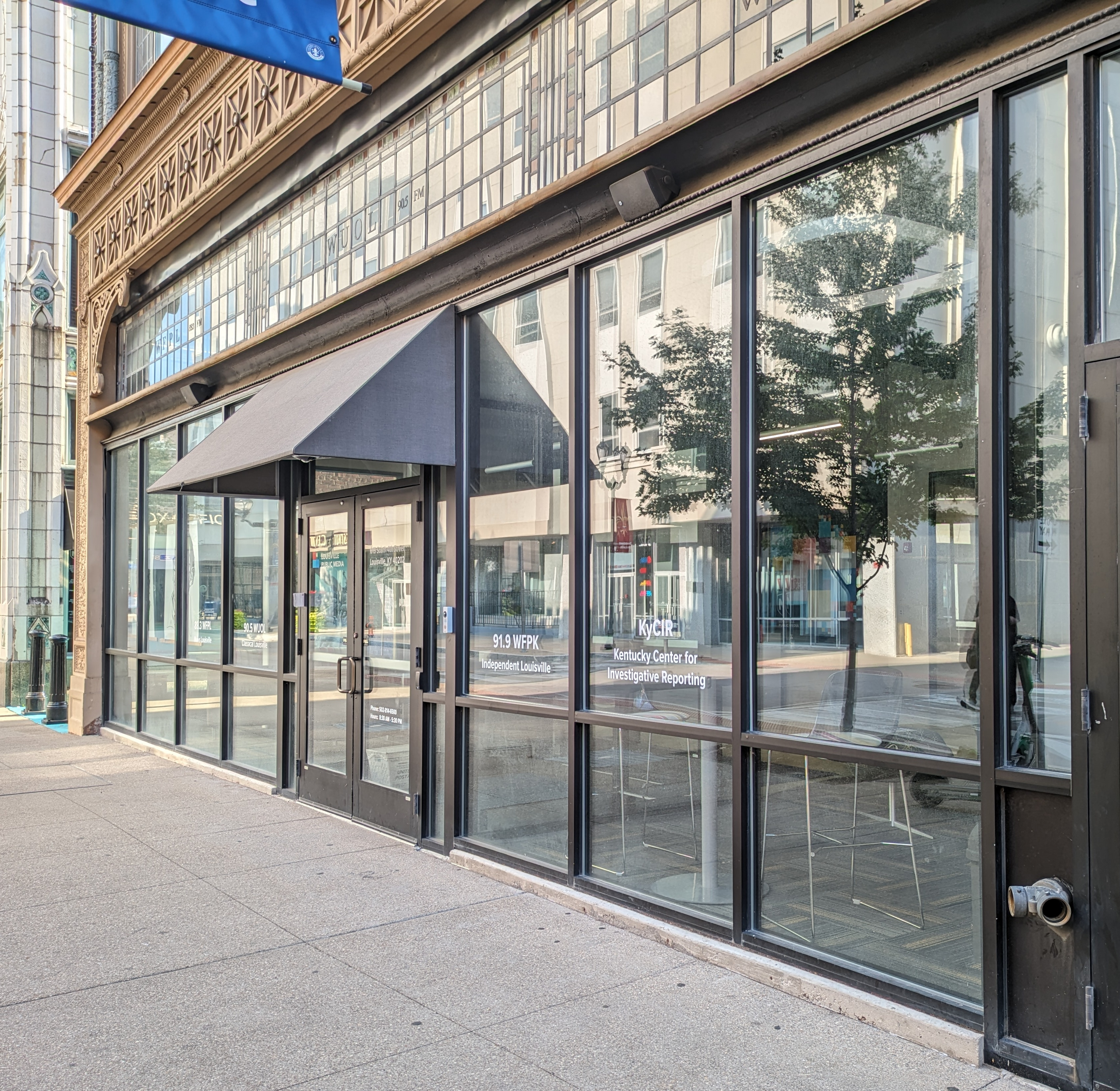
- Office in Louisville
- Louisville, Kentucky; United States
- Broadcast area: Louisville
- Frequency: 91.9 MHz
- Branding: LPM Music

Programming
- Format: Adult album alternative

Ownership
- Owner: Louisville Public Media; (Kentucky Public Radio, Inc.)
- Sister stations: WUOL-FM, WFPL

History
- First air date: 1954
- Call sign meaning: Derived from WFPL

Technical information
- Licensing authority: FCC
- Facility ID: 38621
- Class: B
- ERP: 6,800 watts
- HAAT: 236 meters (774 ft)
- Transmitter coordinates: 38°21′55″N 85°50′24″W

Links
- Public license information: Public file; LMS
- Webcast: Listen live
- Website: www.lpm.org/music

WFPK is a 24-hour listener-supported, noncommercial radio station in Louisville, Kentucky, United States, broadcasting at 91.9 FM with an adult album alternative format. The station plays national and local alternative music. It is owned by Louisville Public Media.

== History ==
The station was founded in 1954 by the Louisville Free Public Library as a classical music station. It was a sister station to WFPL.

In 1975, the station received the entire inventory of classical music recordings from commercial outlet WHAS-FM (now WAMZ-FM), which had discontinued the format after a nine-year run; that station, which carried little or no advertising, was mainly a public service by then-owners, the Bingham family. In 1993, the Free Public Library and the University of Louisville's WUOL-FM (which had competed against WFPK for classical listeners for some 17 years) joined forces to form the Public Radio Partnership, now Louisville Public Media. At that time, WFPK adopted its current format, with a gradual evolution from traditional genres such as jazz, folk, and blues music toward the present AAA playlist heard most of the week.

== Programming ==
WFPK hosts the weekly series Live Lunch, which features local and national acts performing live in front of a studio audience in the station's performance studio. Guests of Live Lunch have included Tommy Emmanuel, Will Oldham, Alejandro Escovedo, The Subdudes, Jonatha Brooke, The Decemberists, Over the Rhine, The Derek Trucks Band, Amos Lee, Edward Sharpe and the Magnetic Zeros and local Louisville bands My Morning Jacket, The Muckrakers and Digby. In 2007, the station released Best of WFPK Live Vol. 1, a limited-edition CD that contained recordings from the series; the disc was given away as an exclusive premium for new members during the spring 2007 membership drive. Since then, it has released 10 more member-exclusive CDs containing more live songs recorded during Live Lunch and other in-studio performances.

A very popular weekend show, Woody's Roadhouse (12 mid-6am Saturday) specializes in heritage R&B, C&W, Blues, Rockabilly and classic Southern Quartet Gospel.
