= The Filson Historical Society =

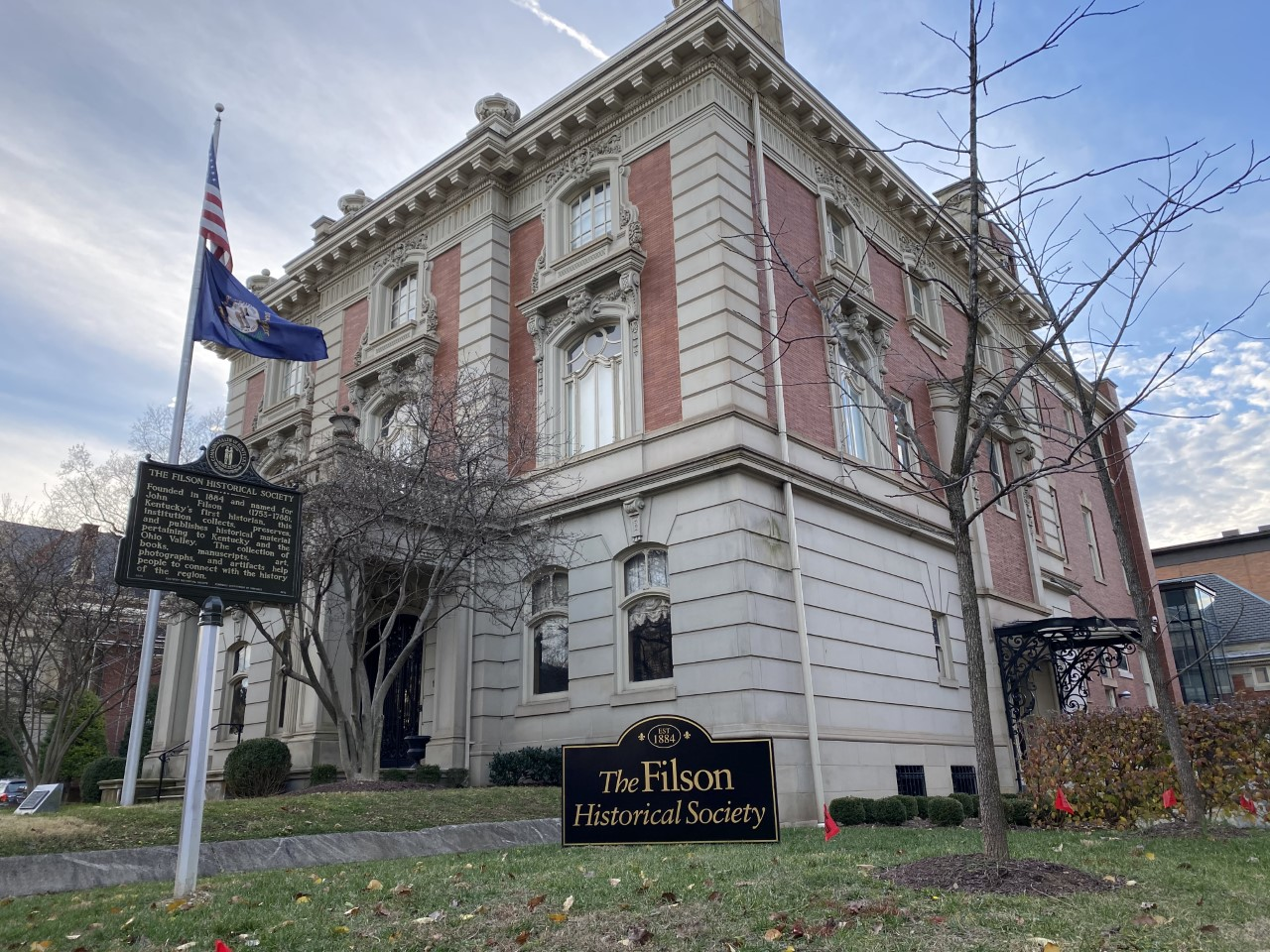
- The Ferguson Mansion, home of the Filson Historical Society in Old Louisville
- Former name: The Filson Club
- Established: 1884
- Location: 1310 South 3rd Street; Louisville, Kentucky 40208
- Coordinates: 38°13′56.2″N 85°45′34.6″W
- Type: History museum
- Founders: Reuben T. Durrett (1824–1913); Richard H. Collins (1824–1888); William Chenault (1835–1901); John Mason Brown (1837–1890); Basil W. Duke (1838–1916); George M. Davie (1848–1900); James Speed Pirtle (1840–1917); Thomas W. Bullitt (1845–1921); Alexander Pope Humphrey (1848–1928); Thomas Speed (1841–1905)
- President: Patrick A. Lewis
- Public transit access: TARC
- Website: filsonhistorical.org

The Filson Historical Society, previously known as The Filson Club, is a privately supported historical society located in the Old Louisville neighborhood of Louisville, Kentucky. Founded in 1884, the Filson is an organization dedicated to continuing adult education through a quarterly peer-reviewed academic journal, Ohio Valley History, a quarterly magazine, The Filson, weekly lectures, historical tours, and exhibits.

== Mission and programs ==
The Filson's mission is to collect, preserve, and tell the stories of Kentucky and Ohio Valley history and culture. The Filson hosts programs and exhibitions that engage critically and honestly with the past with topics such as: Commemorating Juneteenth, David Blight's talk on Frederick Douglass, Christina Snyder's discussion of Great Crossings: Indians, Settlers, and Slaves in the Age of Jackson, Alaina Roberts' I've Been Here All the While: Black Freedom on Native Land, and Dan Gediman's presentation on reckoning with slavery in Kentucky.

The Filson's programming hosts events such as the Gertrude Polk Brown lecture series, which regularly includes authors currently on national bestseller lists, such as David Blight, H. W. Brands, Liza Mundy, Fredrik Logevall, and Steve Inskeep; the Notable Louisville Neighborhoods series, a series designed to connect people with history in a meaningful way and to highlight resources available at the Filson; workshops and discussions led by Filson staff on how to archive and preserve your personal and family history, how to research your historic home, how to care for historic photographs, and more; a variety of concerts featuring regional artists; and authors, journalists, and historians discussing the history of the Ohio River valley.

== History ==
The Filson Club was founded on May 15, 1884, by ten men, primarily Louisvillians, with a shared love of history. The primary founder and first president was Reuben T. Durrett. The organization was named in honor of John Filson, Kentucky's first Anglophone historian, and the centennial of his historical works, including a 1784 map of Kentucky and his book, The Discovery, Settlement, and Present State of Kentucke. Filson members met at founding president Reuben Durrett's home at 202 E. Chestnut at Brook Street in Louisville from 1884 to 1913. Here, Durrett maintained an extensive historical collection.

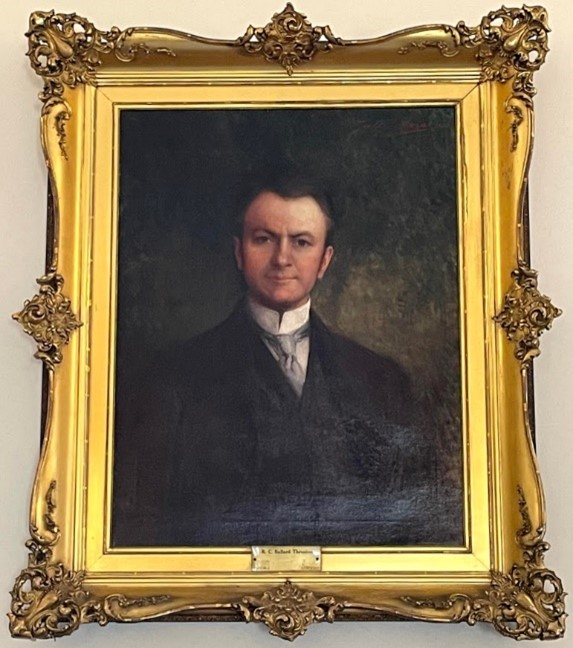
Rogers Clark Ballard Thruston (1858–1946) c. 1906 Jules-Charles Aviat (1844–1931) Oil on Canvas Filson Museum Collection (1929.8.60)

During Durrett's final illness in 1913, arrangements were made to sell his collection to the University of Chicago. This was due to the lack of a fireproof vault for document storage in Louisville. Unfortunately, much of the Filson Club's collections were incorporated into Durrett's collection, meaning a portion left the state. The Filson's collections that remained after the sale were transferred to the Filson Vice President Rogers Clark Ballard Thruston library, located in the Columbia Building at Fourth and Main Streets in Louisville, and were housed there until 1929. Thruston and other Filson members recognized the need for a stand-alone building. A drive for funds was successfully conducted in 1926, and a property was purchased, remodeled, and fireproofed.

In June 1929, the Filson's materials and Mr. Thruston's collection, which he gifted in full, were transferred to the club's new home at 118 West Breckinridge Street. Architect E. T. Hutchings renovated two townhouses into one Georgian-style building, housing the Filson's archives, library, museum, and offices.

As time passed, the administration and board began looking for a new location to accommodate a growing collection and staff, along with additional programming space. The purchase of the Edwin Hite Ferguson Mansion at 1310 South 3rd Street was finalized in 1984, the centennial of the Filson's existence, and the renovation and additions to the Filson's new home began. Building renovations and the addition of 6 levels of temperature-controlled/secure stacks were completed throughout 1985. In the summer of 1986, the Filson's collections and staff moved into the new location, encompassing the mansion for offices and library/archival storage and a carriage house for storage and display.

The Ferguson Mansion has been the Filson Historical Society's headquarters since 1986. Designed by the Dodd & Cobb architectural firm and completed in 1905, the Ferguson mansion is one of Louisville's finest examples of beaux-arts architecture. Built for industrialist Edwin Hite Ferguson, it showcased his success and family's social status. Sold to the Pearson family in the 1920s, the mansion was a funeral home for almost half a century. After passing through two other owners – including serving as the campaign headquarters for former Kentucky governor John Y. Brown Jr. (b. 1933, governor of Kentucky 1979–1983) – the Filson purchased the mansion and accompanying carriage house in 1984. Renovation and the addition of a stack for the collection were completed in the spring of 1986.

The library, archival, and museum collections continued to grow, as did programming and staff, throughout the 1980s and 1990s; the Filson's name changed from "Club" to "Historical Society" as a focus on scholarly research on Ohio Valley history was introduced. Plans to expand the 3rd Street campus began in 2002 with the purchase of the Bank One building located at 4th and Ormsby, a 60,000 sq ft building with two parking lots. The Filson's major expansion began in the 2010s with renovations to the Ferguson Mansion and carriage house and the construction of the Owsley Brown II History Center, creating space for exhibition galleries, expanded library and special collections reading rooms, programming, and event rental venues.

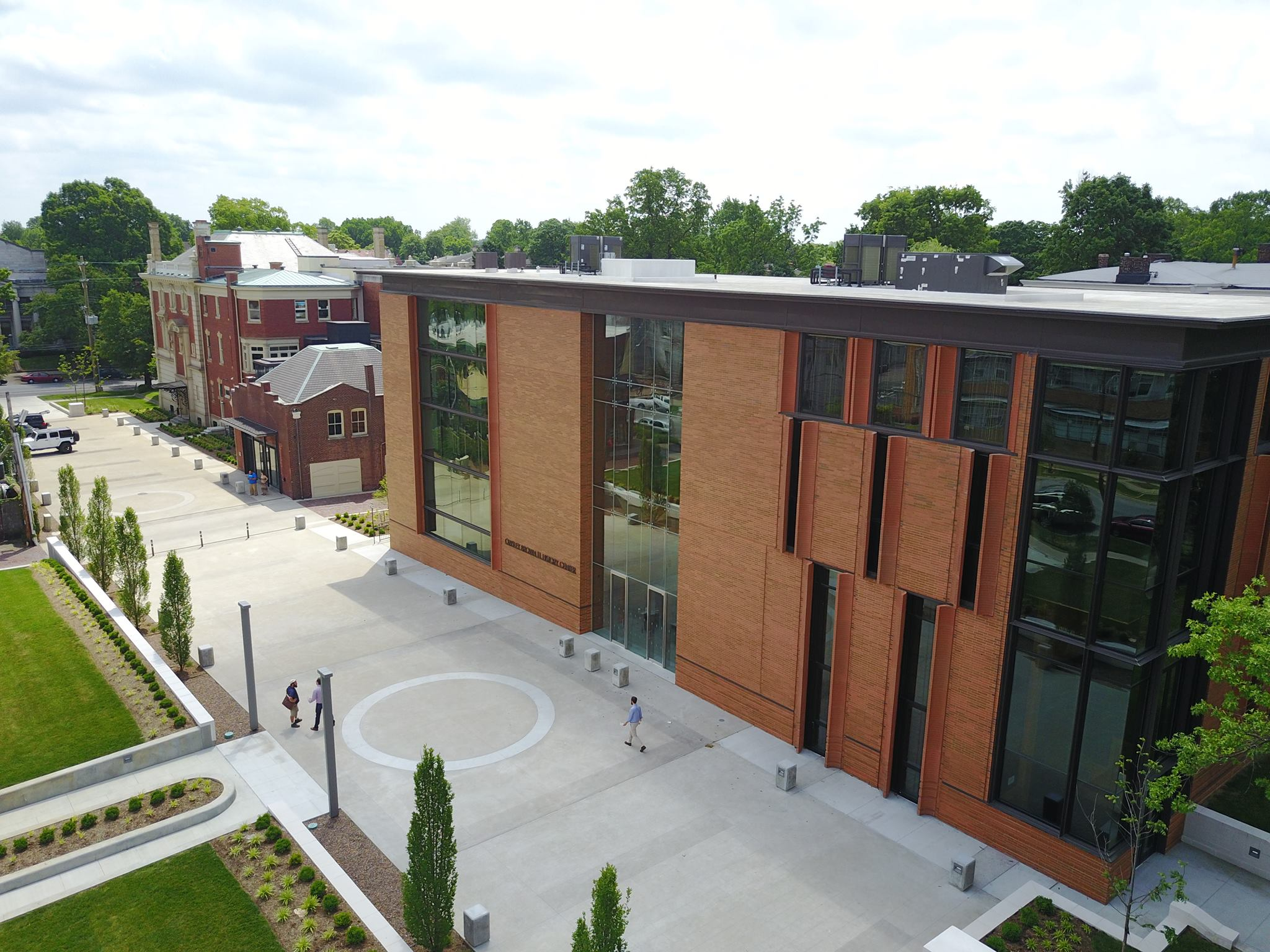
Owsley Brown II History Center

The Filson opened its renovated campus and the newly constructed Owsley Brown II History Center at 1310 South 3rd Street in October 2016.

In 2017, the Filson began a new initiative to document, preserve, and study the history of Jewish life and experience in Louisville and the Ohio Valley region, establishing the Jewish Community Archive.

In the summer of 2020, in response to protests against police killings of African-Americans, Filson published a list of historical resources on racial inequality in Louisville and issued a community response to racism.

=== Relationship to Oxmoor Farm ===
The Filson Historical Society has a unique relationship with the Bullitt family and the historic Oxmoor Farm in eastern Jefferson County. The original part of the Oxmoor mansion was built in 1791. It remained in the Bullitt family for six generations until the death of Thomas Walker Bullitt in 1991 and his widow, Katharine Stammers Bullitt, in 2005. The Filson Historical Society has no ownership interest in the mansion and grounds. The Oxmoor Preservation Committee was established under Thomas Walker Bullitt's will and is responsible for advising the Oxmoor trustee on the care and ongoing maintenance of the Oxmoor mansion and farm; the president and CEO of the Filson is a member of this committee, as are Bullitt family members.

Through Mr. Bullitt's estate, the Filson received generous support to develop and enhance programming and research in line with Mr. Bullitt's general interests in philanthropy, education, preservation, and Kentucky history. A subsequent agreement with the Bullitt family gave the Filson complete title to the collection of Bullitt family papers, spanning over two centuries of life at Oxmoor, and generously endowed additional funding for scholarship, archiving, and programming expenses. As a component of the relationship with Oxmoor, Filson conducts several annual programs and events at Oxmoor. Oxmoor and a surrounding parcel of land are owned in trust and managed by a trustee and are protected in perpetuity through a Commonwealth of Kentucky preservation easement administered by the Kentucky Heritage Council.

== Collections ==
The Filson Historical Society's Collection includes approximately 2.1 million documents, photos, and prints, 50,000 books, 10,000 museum items, and 400 portraits. The Filson began collecting historical material soon after its founding in 1884 when few other Kentucky institutions were doing so. With many of its early members belonging to Kentucky's oldest and most prominent families, the Filson was able to begin assembling an important collection of original letters, diaries, business records, and other primary sources. Its holdings for the late eighteenth through mid-nineteenth centuries are unrivaled in Kentucky.

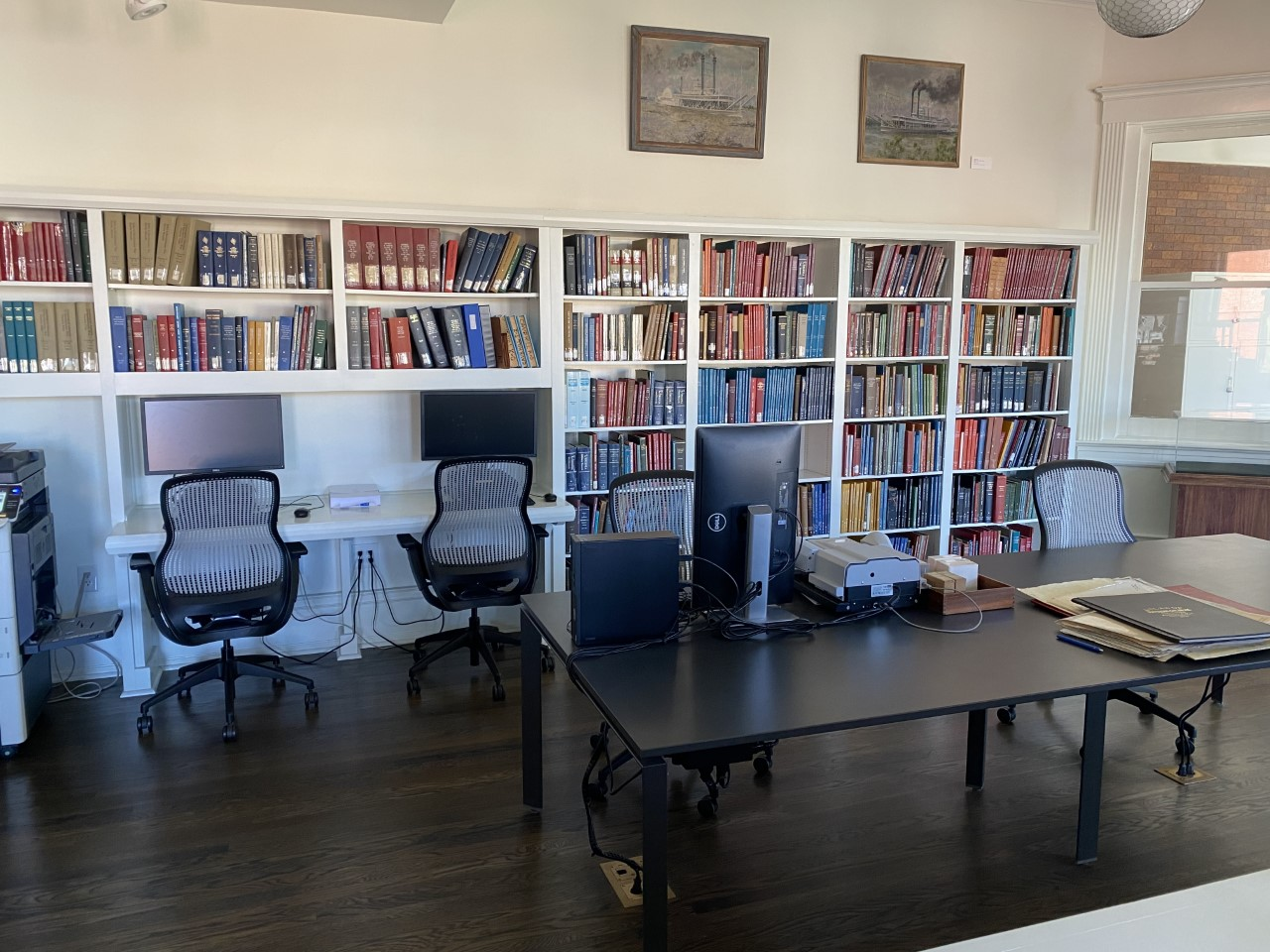
Library at the Filson Historical Society

The collection focuses on Kentucky, the Ohio Valley, and the Upland South. Still, it is national and even international in scope, with researchers from across the nation and abroad visiting each year. The Filson's unique holdings are essential primary sources for scholars of the Trans-Appalachian frontier; the Lewis and Clark Expedition; antebellum enslavement and emancipation; Southern Jewish history; regional architecture; Progressive-era urban reform; Suffrage and Women's Rights; regional theater, music, and literature; river and rail transportation; and military history from the 18th to 20th centuries. In addition to the manuscript and rare book holdings, the Filson holds an important museum collection of early Kentucky portraiture, Ohio Valley artists in various media, and textiles and historical clothing.

The Filson's website has extensive collections listings with finding aids, a keyword-searchable database of manuscript collections, digital collections of photographs and museum objects, and a library catalog of rare books and pamphlets. Ohio Valley History regularly publishes collections essays by Filson archivists and curators that discuss new acquisitions, themes running across collections, and raising awareness of marginalized voices from within the collection.

Since 2001, Filson has supported scholarly research in the collection with a fellowship program that has funded the work of over 250 scholars from institutions across the United States and the world.

== Publications ==
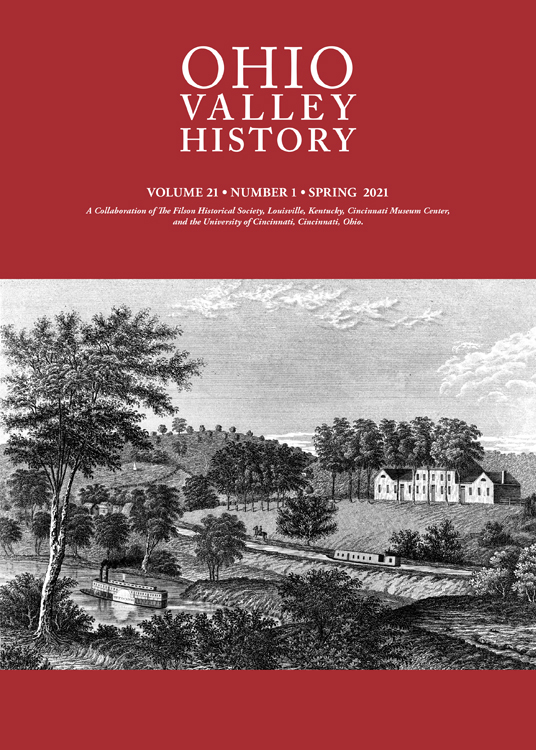
Ohio Valley History, Front Cover, Volume 21 No. 1

The Filson produces two quarterly publications: Ohio Valley History and The Filson news magazine.

Ohio Valley History, a collaboration of the Filson Historical Society, Cincinnati Museum Center, and the University of Cincinnati, is a quarterly journal of the history and culture of the Ohio Valley and the Upper South.

The Filson is a quarterly news magazine dedicated to giving members a more in-depth view into activities at the Filson Historical Society. With articles about recent acquisitions, staff research in the collections, and membership information, it fulfills the organization's mission to collect, preserve, and tell the stories of the Ohio Valley region.

Published between 1926 and 2002, The Filson Club History Quarterly offered scholarly articles related to the history of Kentucky and the surrounding area and genealogy, news, and comments geared toward the Filson membership. In 2010, using grant money from Joan and Burlyn Pike, all back issues of Filson Quarterly were digitized and published online as free PDF-format downloads. Article titles and authors are searchable and there is also a PDF-format table of contents for all published articles.

== See also ==
- List of attractions and events in the Louisville metropolitan area
- List of museums in the Louisville metropolitan area
- List of historical societies in Kentucky
- List of museums in Kentucky
