= Christ Church Episcopal (Chattanooga, Tennessee) =

- U.S. National Register of Historic Places
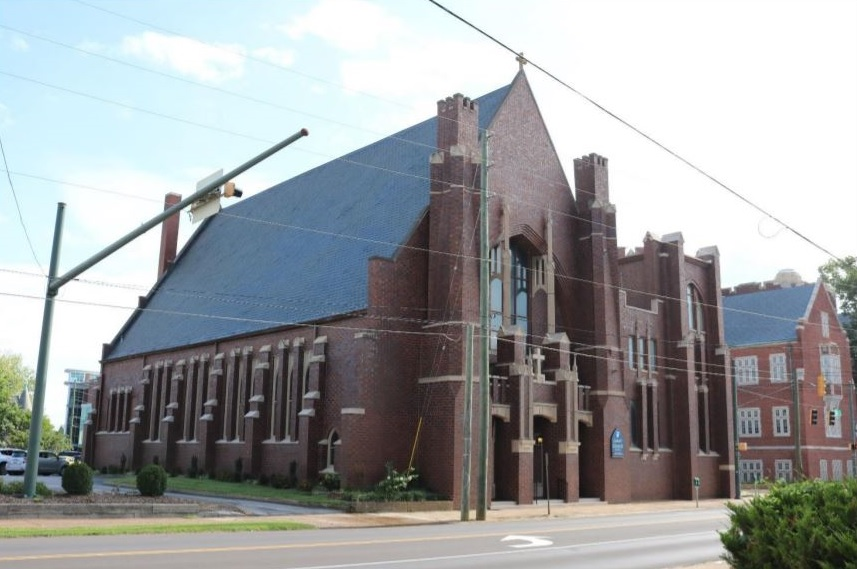

- Location within Tennessee Location within the United States
- Location: 663 Douglas St, Chattanooga, Tennessee
- Coordinates: 35°02′46″N 85°18′06″W
- Built: 1906
- Architect: Mason Maury
- Architectural style: Gothic Revival
- NRHP reference No.: 100006386
- Added to NRHP: April 09, 2021

Christ Episcopal Church is an Episcopal Church in Chattanooga, Tennessee. It is a part of the Episcopal Diocese of East Tennessee. The church reported 172 members in 2019 and 118 members in 2023; no membership statistics were reported in 2024 parochial reports. Plate and pledge income reported for the congregation in 2024 was $91,873 with average Sunday attendance (ASA) of 58 persons.

In November 1900, a small group from St. Paul’s, led by Prof. John Roy Baylor, founder of the Baylor School, obtained permission to establish a new parish on the east side of town. The inaugural service, conducted by the first rector, Fr. William C. Robertson of Nashville, took place in March 1901 at Masonic Hall, situated at 8th and Cherry Streets.

The present church building, a neo-Gothic structure, underwent remodeling by the Boston firm of Ralph Adams Cram.

During its early years, Fr. Robertson spearheaded the formation of the Christ Church Service League, engaging nearly the entire congregation in pioneering social service activities. These initiatives included working with inmates at the County Jail and residents of the County Poor House, Pine Breeze, and Erlanger. The Sisters of the Tabernacle, whose convent was located across McCallie Avenue from Christ Church, provided invaluable assistance.

Around 1916, responding to a plea for help from an African American hospital patient, Fr. Robertson organized St. Mary the Virgin on the corner of 8th and Douglas Streets. Fr. Robertson also served as St. Mary’s missioner, and the two congregations occasionally worshipped together, particularly during Christmas and other occasions. Before the establishment of the present Greek Orthodox Church, worshippers in that tradition were members of Christ Church parish.

As Christ Church continued to expand, a new parish house named Fox Hall was added in 1957. Additionally, a self-sustaining Canterbury Club was established for college students and staff. In 1982, the Community Kitchen opened in Fox Hall, with teams of volunteers from seven downtown churches taking turns preparing and serving food. This arrangement continued until 1986 when a larger building was required, prompting the kitchen to move to its current location on 11th Street.

In the 1990s, the adjacent Canterbury House, which had been housing university students for many years, was converted into apartments for HIV patients. The Metropolitan Ministry also relocated from its city office to share the same building. A memorial garden, initiated by an anonymous donor, was consecrated in the churchyard in 1999. Additionally, in the late 1990s, a new tracker organ was installed, which continues to be used for concerts, evensong, and regular solemn high masses.
