= WUOL-FM =

Radio station in Louisville, Kentucky

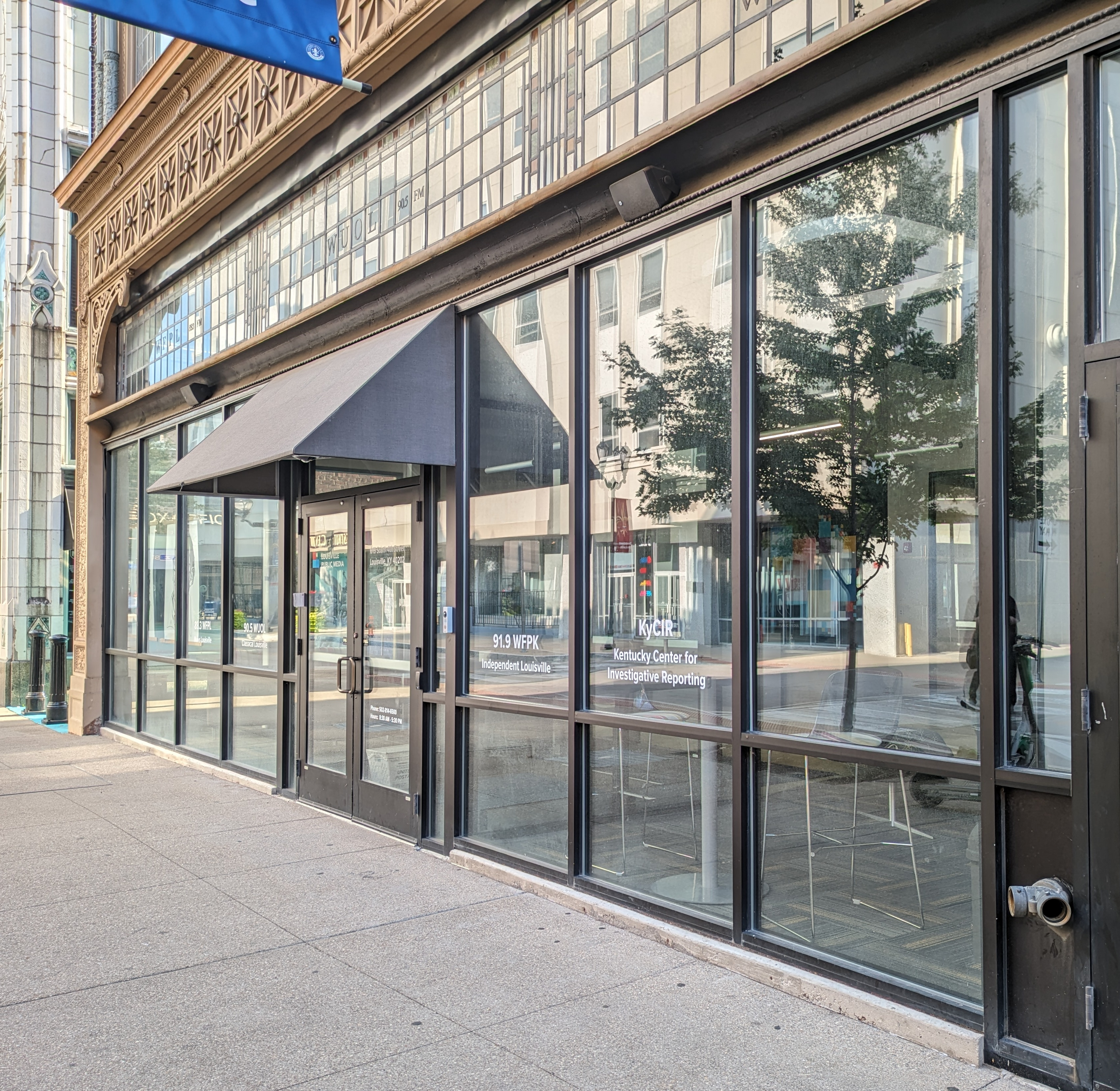
- Office in Louisville
- Louisville, Kentucky; United States
- Broadcast area: Louisville, Kentucky
- Frequency: 90.5 MHz
- Branding: LPM Classical

Programming
- Format: Classical

Ownership
- Owner: Louisville Public Media; (Kentucky Public Radio, Inc.)
- Sister stations: WFPK, WFPL

History
- First air date: 1976
- Former call signs: WUOL-FM (1976–1979); WUOL (1979–1982)
- Call sign meaning: University Of Louisville (original licensee)

Technical information
- Licensing authority: FCC
- Facility ID: 69113
- Class: B
- ERP: 21,000 watts
- HAAT: 236 meters (774 feet)

Links
- Public license information: Public file; LMS
- Webcast: Listen Live - direct streaming URL; Listen Live - player
- Website: lpm.org/classical

WUOL-FM (90.5 FM, "LPM Classical") is a 24-hour listener-supported noncommercial radio station in Louisville, Kentucky, broadcasting a classical music format. It began broadcasting in December 1976 as part of the University of Louisville.

All three stations have been licensed to the Louisville Public Media consortium (formerly Public Radio Partnership) since 1993. Prior to the university giving the station out and being a member of the Partnership, WUOL unintentionally competed with WFPK for the local audience for classical music.

The station was reassigned the WUOL-FM call letters by the Federal Communications Commission on March 19, 1982.
