= Kenyon Building =

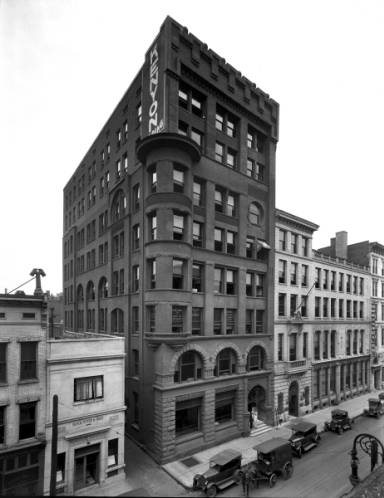
- Interactive map of the Kenyon Building area

General information
- Status: Demolished
- Type: Office
- Architectural style: Richardsonian Romanesque
- Location: 500 W Main
- Coordinates: 38°15′23.35″N 85°45′31.28″W
- Completed: 1886
- Demolished: 1973

Height
- Height: 115 feet (35.1 m)

Technical details
- Material: stone and brick
- Floor count: 6

Design and construction
- Architect: Mason Maury

The Kenyon Building was the first skyscraper in Louisville, Kentucky, United States. Standing six stories tall, the building was located on Fifth Street, between Main and Market Streets. The building was razed in 1974 and would eventually become the site of a much taller skyscraper, the Humana Building.

It was designed in the Chicago school style with Richardsonian Romanesque elements by architect Mason Maury for the Kentucky Conference of The Methodist Episcopal Church.

"I made all the plans for the Kenyon building with my own hands. No other architect, here or elsewhere, had anything whatever to do with them. Nother architect was consulted even. The only man who was consulted was Mr. Henning, whose enterprise erected the building. I made all the drawings and superintended the construction. When Mr. Henning proposed putting up the Kenyon, I suggested that we take a trip together, and see what they were doing in other cities. We visited several cities, New York and Chicago among them, and looked at their houses, but I made no drawings on this trip, and the building is not designed after anything we saw. It is entirely original in its plan. I suppose that the impression that I did not design the building grew out of the fact that a Chicago firm, for which my brother is the agent here, did the fire-proofing in the building, and put up a sign in the window to this effect, my brother's name appearing on this sign as agent. Then people confounded me with F.W. Maury. This fire-proofing, however, was but a small part of the cost of the house. Most of the contracts were let to Louisville people, who did the work. --Mason Maury, 1887"

Preceded by unknown	Tallest Building in Louisville; 1886-1890	Succeeded by Columbia Building
