= Louisville Public Media =

Non-profit organization in the USA

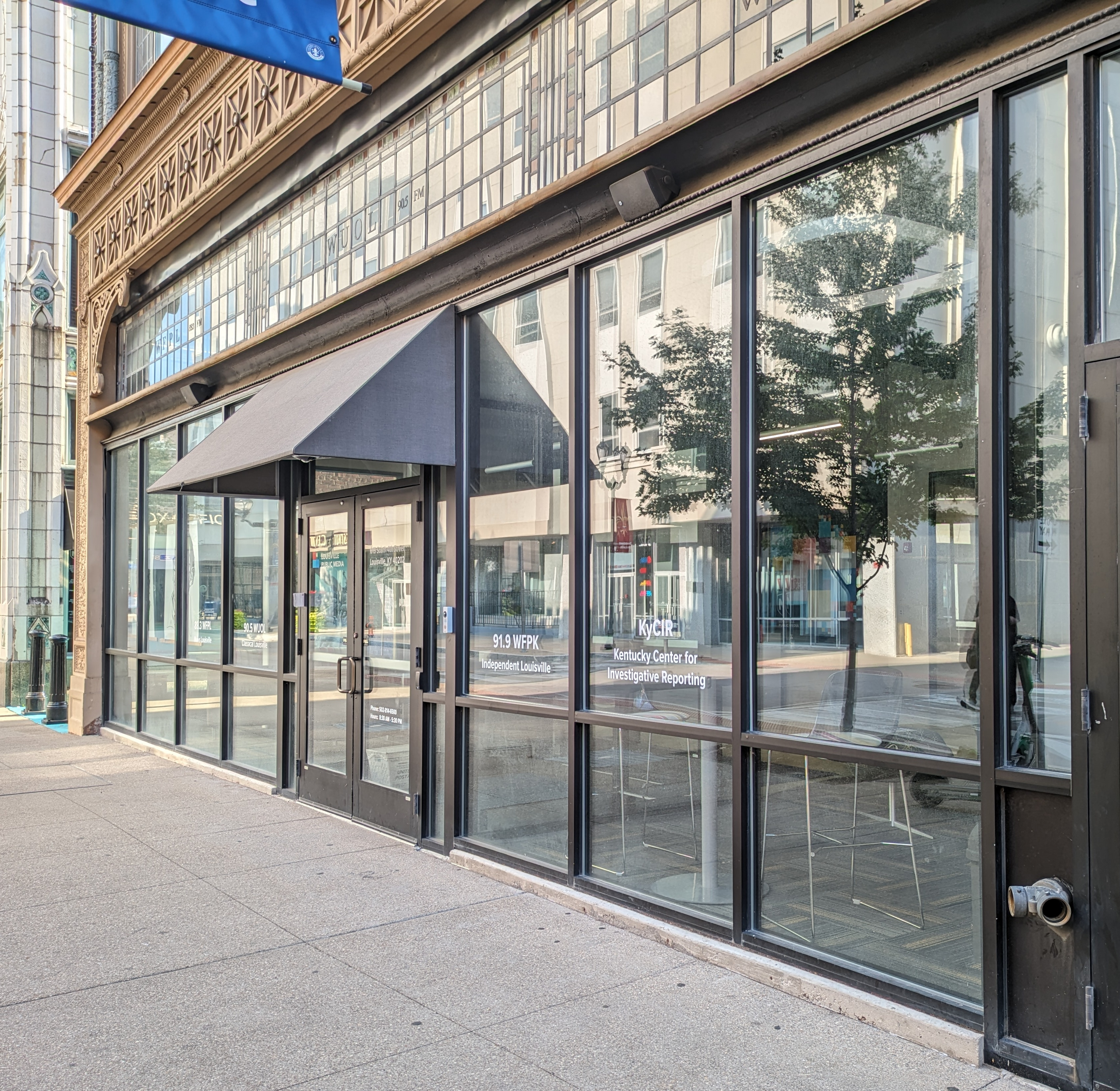
Office in Louisville

Kentucky Public Radio, doing business as Louisville Public Media, is a non-profit organization that operates the three National Public Radio member stations in Louisville, Kentucky—news and talk WFPL, classical WUOL-FM, and adult album alternative WFPK.

The current organization began in 1993, when the Louisville Free Public Library, licensee of WFPL and WFPK, along with the University of Louisville, which ran WUOL-FM, collectively transferred the licenses of the three stations to the community-licensed Public Radio Partnership. The organization has a board of directors which consists of three members appointed by the University of Louisville, four members appointed by the Metro Louisville government, 16 at-large members from the Louisville community including the chairman, and the organization's president.

It was the first public broadcasting organization (not counting state networks) to unite three radio stations under a single umbrella. This move came amid the expansion of NPR programming in the 1990s. WFPL, long the flagship NPR station in Kentuckiana, found it difficult to make room on its schedule for both the new programming and the jazz, bluegrass, and blues music that had been a staple on the station for years. At the same time, both WUOL and WFPK aired classical music in a market that was nowhere near large enough to support two classical music stations. The two stations had been competing for classical listeners since 1976, when UL launched WUOL. Even before then, WFPK had to contend with a commercial classical broadcaster, WHAS-FM, from 1966 to 1975; that station was the sister of heritage AM station WHAS and was mainly a civic service (it carried little or no advertising) by WHAS' longtime owners, the Bingham family.

After two years of discussions leading to the Partnership's formation, the stations launched a major format overhaul that took effect on air on January 8, 1996. WUOL became the sole outlet for classical music in Louisville, in part due to its longstanding ties with UL's School of Music. WFPL turned its focus to news and talk, ceding its entire recorded music inventory and most of its music-based programming to WFPK, which dropped classical entirely and eventually became a mostly Triple-A station, largely due to the decline in popularity of the genres WFPL featured earlier in its history. In 2000, the stations jointly moved their operations to the former Electric Building in downtown Louisville. Eight years later, the group changed its trade name to the current Louisville Public Media.

In 2013, Louisville Public Media created the Kentucky Center for Investigative Reporting (KyCIR), a nonprofit newsroom focused on investigative journalism.
