= WFPL =

Public radio station in Louisville

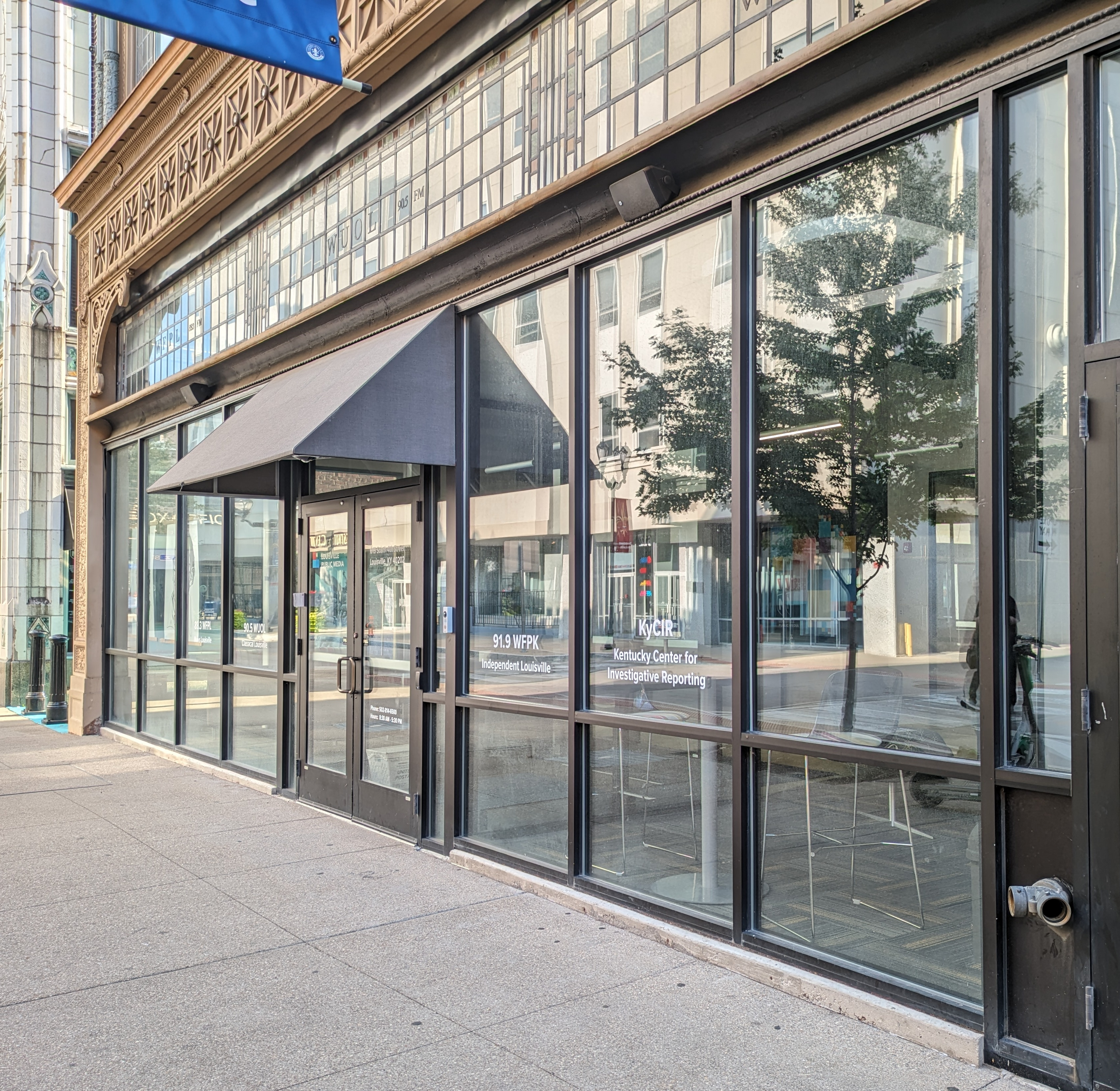
- Office in Louisville
- Louisville, Kentucky; United States
- Broadcast area: Louisville metropolitan area
- Frequency: 89.3 MHz
- Branding: LPM News

Programming
- Format: Public radio (news and information)
- Affiliations: Kentucky Public Radio; National Public Radio; American Public Media; Public Radio Exchange; BBC World Service

Ownership
- Owner: Louisville Public Media; (Kentucky Public Radio, Inc.)
- Sister stations: WFPK, WUOL-FM

History
- First air date: 1950
- Call sign meaning: "Free Public Library" (original licensee)

Technical information
- Licensing authority: FCC
- Facility ID: 4258
- Class: B
- ERP: 21,000 watts
- HAAT: 236 meters (774 ft)
- Transmitter coordinates: 38.365°N 85.840°W

Links
- Public license information: Public file; LMS
- Webcast: Listen live
- Website: lpm.org/news

WFPL (89.3 MHz) is a 24-hour listener-supported, noncommercial FM radio station in Louisville, Kentucky. The station focuses on news and information, and is the primary National Public Radio member for the Louisville radio market. WFPL is now owned by Louisville Public Media and was originally owned by the Louisville Free Public Library. When the station came on the air in 1950, it was the first library-owned radio station in the country.

WFPL's transmitter is off Moser Knob Road in New Albany, Indiana, amid the towers for other Louisville-area FM and TV stations. The 21,000 watt signal covers parts of Kentucky and Indiana.

== History ==
On February 20, 1950, WFPL first signed on the air. It began operating as a public radio station under the ownership of the Louisville Free Public Library, giving the station the distinction of being the first library-owned radio station in the country. Founded years before the Public Broadcasting Act of 1967 and National Public Radio's creation in 1970, the station was made possible by the donation of equipment by the Bingham family, who owned The Courier-Journal and WHAS (840 AM) radio at the time.

Originally airing a mix of school lessons and classical music, it ceded classical music to WFPK when it signed on in 1954. Gradually, the station began airing news, drama, and old radio shows–something approximating the format of what would eventually become full-service public radio. By the 1980s, WFPL had evolved into a typical full-service NPR member station, airing a mix of news, talk, jazz, bluegrass, and blues. However, with the expansion of NPR programming in the 1990s, WFPL found it difficult to shoehorn the new programming onto its schedule. A solution came when the Free Public Library partnered with the University of Louisville to create the Public Radio Partnership, now Louisville Public Media. Starting on January 8, 1996; WFPL ceded almost all of its remaining music programming to WFPK, becoming an NPR news talk station.

== Awards ==
In 1951 WFPL won a George Foster Peabody award for public service.

== See also ==
- WFPK
- WUOL-FM
