= Mason Maury =

American architect (1847–1919)

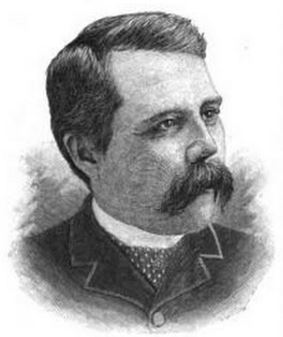
- Born: May 1, 1847; Louisville, Kentucky, U.S.
- Died: January 1, 1919 (aged 71); Louisville, Kentucky, U.S.
- Resting place: Cave Hill Cemetery; Louisville, Kentucky
- Education: Massachusetts Institute of Technology
- Occupation: Architect
- Spouse: Gertrude Vaughan (m. 1885; died 1888) Sarah Webb (m. 1895; died 1919)
- Awards: American Institute of Architects Fellow

Signature
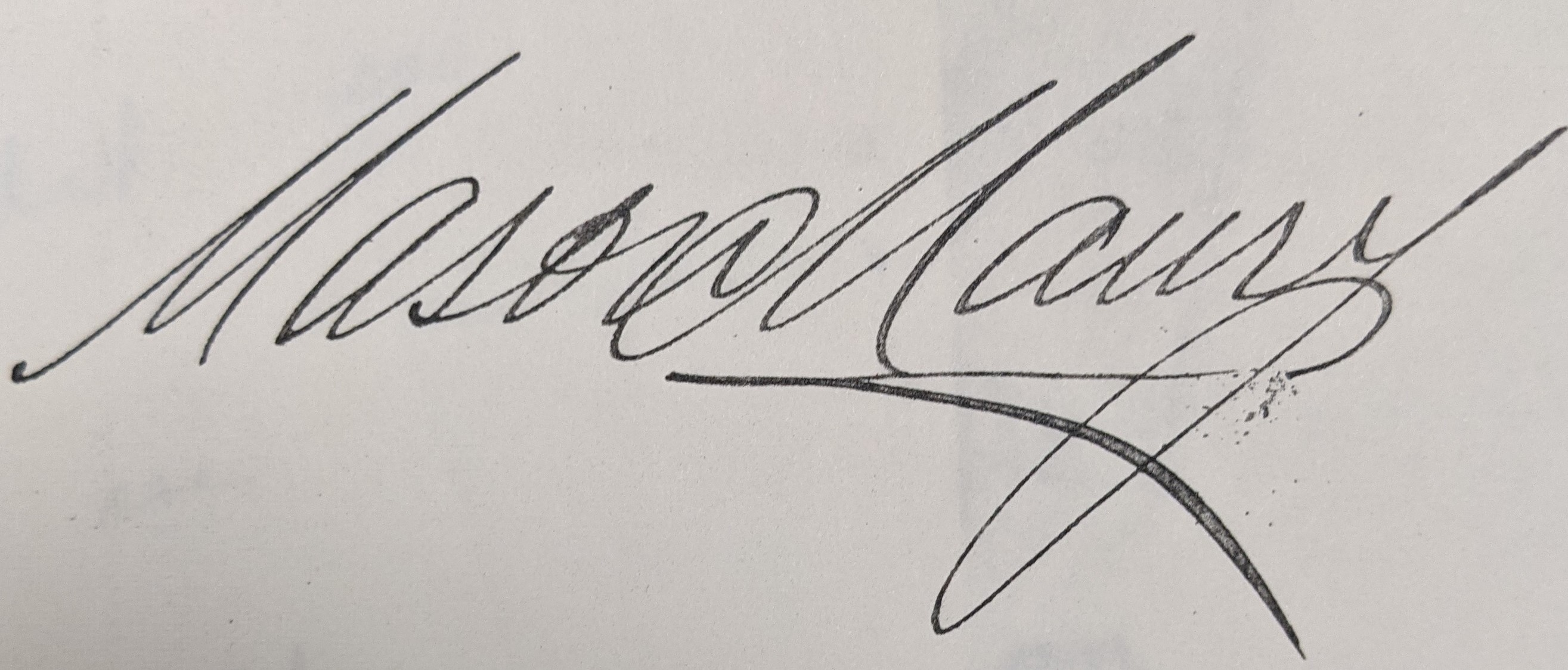

Johnson Mason Maury (May 1, 1847 – January 2, 1919) was an American architect and inventor who designed and built over 700 residential and commercial structures, mostly in Louisville, Kentucky where he pioneered Richardsonian Romanesque and Prairie School architecture in Kentucky. Maury is mostly known for his works on The Kenyon Building and The Kaufman-Strauss building. Maury attended Male High School. After graduation, Maury moved to Boston where he studied architecture for two years under architect H.H. Richardson who had designed the Grace Episcopal Church during the time of Maury's stay. Maury returned to Louisville and worked under Episcopal Church Architect William H. Redin for six years. Maury was also a founding member of The Kentucky Association of Architects, in which he served as Second Vice President, as well as President of the Louisville Chapter of the American Institute of Architecture.

== Associated architects, draftsman, and contractors ==
- William H. Redin
- William J. Dodd
- Oscar Haupt, Superintendent of Kenyan Building, later relocated to Birmingham, AL
- E. Walter Hillerich
- Arthur Raymond Smith (draftsman)
- Greiner & Sons

== Catalogue ==
=== Redin & Maury (1877) ===
Name	Photo	Location	Date Commissioned	Notes
W.H. Dillingham Residence		Second and Broadway; Louisville, Kentucky	1877	demolished

=== Mason Maury (1882–1887, 1895–1919) ===
Name	Photo	Location	Date Commissioned	Notes
S Bisley House		1029 Bardstown Rd (1925 Baxter Ave)	1884/1885	current building has unoriginal front addition
Charles P. Moorman Row Houses (St. Catherine)		313–337 E St Catherine; Louisville, Kentucky	1884	attributed design
Charles P. Moorman Row Houses (Preston)		1026–1040 S Preston; Louisville, Kentucky	1884/1885	attributed design
Henning & Sons, office building		Unknown	1886	
Judge Russell Houston residence		1332 South Fourth Street; Louisville, Kentucky	1886	Louisville Bourbon Inn
Dr. Hubbard M. Smith		Unknown	1886	
Unknown		Owensboro, Kentucky	1886	
Frederick H. Warren		Montgomery, Alabama	1886	potentially (51) 459 Goldthwaite St
Kenyon Building		112 South Fifth Street; Louisville, Kentucky	1886	demolished in 1974
W.S. Mathews Building House		1245 (1333) Fourth Street; Louisville, Kentucky	1886	demolished
Henry L. Stone House		1300 Third Street; Louisville, Kentucky	1886	Juo. Greiner & Bros, builders
Boyle Gill Boyle (B.O. Boyle) residence		1118 or 1209 S Second Street; Louisville, Kentucky	1886	J. N. Struck & Bros., builders
K.W. Smith House		1118 Third Street; Louisville, Kentucky	1886	interior extensively remodeled with a rear addition in the 1920s for Archbishop John A. Floersh and again remodeled in the 1960s for D.J. Dougherty & Sons Funeral Home
Charles P. Moorman House		Maybe St Catherine; Louisville, Kentucky	1886	
J.M. Bockner, dwelling		Maybe St Catherine; Louisville, Kentucky	1886	
William H. Mundy House		623 Third St; Louisville, Kentucky	1886	demolished
George Merz		Unknown	1886	
Thomas Shreve store and office building		353–355 S Fifth; Louisville, Kentucky	1886	
J.D. Reed, two residences		Unknown	1886	
Samuel Castleman House		406 West Chestnut; Louisville, Kentucky	1886	
Central Passenger, R.R. Co. (stables)		Unknown	1886	
Mrs. J. O'Riley House		403 West Chestnut Street; Louisville, Kentucky	1886	
Mrs. James B. Clay, Sr. House		4.5 miles on Versailles Pike, Lexington	1886	
W.F. Rubel House		1515 Hepburn Ave	1886	
O.T. Sutfield residence		1014 (1108) South Third Street	1886	
Mrs. Catherine M. Short House		1349 Fourth Street; Louisville, Kentucky	1886	
J.F. Smith House		1236 Second Street; Louisville, Kentucky	1886	
Charles E. Wood House		943 Cherokee Rd; Louisville, Kentucky	1886	
Louisville Girl's High School		Southwest corner, Fifth and Hill	1898	Charles Meyer's designed the 1899 addition. demolished in 1971
Barren County Courthouse		Barren County, Kentucky	1896	
Mary Meany House		1414 S Fourth; Louisville, Kentucky	1897	
Bullitt County Courthouse		Bullitt County, Kentucky	1900/1902	
Fountain Court Apartments		414–418 Fountain Court; Louisville, Kentucky	1901	
The Women's Club Building		1212 S Fourth Street; Louisville, Kentucky	1901	destroyed by fire in 1917
Kaufman-Straus Building(Polytechnic Society Library)	Louisville – Kaufman-Straus Building	427 South Fourth Street	1901	
John H. Heywood Elementary School	John H. Heywood Elementary School	422 Heywood Ave	1902	
First Lutheran English Church	First Lutheran Church in Louisville	417 E Broadway	1904	
Christ Church Episcopal (Chattanooga, Tennessee)	Christ Church, Chattanooga, Tennessee	663 Douglas St, Chattanooga, TN	1904	
William W Davies House		927 S Fourth Street; Louisville, Kentucky	1905	demolished
Mason Maury House		2119 Kenilworth Avenue; Louisville, Kentucky	1910	
Whiteside House		2409 Cherokee Parkway; Louisville, Kentucky	1910	
Broadway Zion Baptist Church		1301 W Broadway; Louisville, Kentucky	1910	
Ralph E. Hill House		2115 Maryland Avenue; Louisville, Kentucky	1911	
W.H. Dillingham House		215 West Broadway; Louisville, Kentucky	1910/1911	demolished
Office Building		106 N 3rd St, Bardstown, Kentucky	1911/1912	heavy exterior remodeling has changed the original first floor design
Russell Meriweather Hughes House		312 West Courtland Place; San Antonio, TX	1912	former home of Russell Meriweather Hughes Jr. (La Meri)
Sapinsky's Clothing Store		225 South Fourth; Louisville, Kentucky	1912	demolished
Highland Baptist Church		1101 Cherokee Rd; Louisville, Kentucky	1913	
Clement R. Manemann Store and Dwelling		St. Matthews	1914	
H.B. Bretney House	1602 N Fountain Blvd, Springfield, Ohio	1915		
William A Thomson, remodel		2100 Millvale Rd	1915	
Louisville Drying Machinery Company		451 Baxter Avenue; Louisville, Kentucky	1916	

=== Maury & Haupt (1887–1889) ===
Name	Photo	Location	Date Commissioned	Notes
W.L. Chambers (bank bldg.)		223 North Montgomery, Sheffield, Alabama	1887	
W.C. Hutchins House		Unknown	1887	
Mrs. Cecelia K. Crawford House		971 Third Street	1887	Demolished
Charles V Johnson House		1524 Brook Street	1887	
Foster Thomas House		1322 South Fourth	1887	
Cahaba Pump Station (Birmingham Water Works Company)		4012 Sicard Hollow Rd, Birmingham, AL	1887	
Jefferson Building Improvement Company (residence)		Birmingham, Alabama	1887	F.C. Thompson (contractor)
T. L. Jefferson (9 houses)		Floyd and Gray	1887	demolished
C. Johnson House		Unknown	1887	
James Leech (block of dwellings 75 by 120)		Unknown	1887	
McFarran Memorial Church (Louisville Church of Christ)		1201 South Fourth Street	1887	
Charles Strater House(41 by 54)		1439 St. James Ct.	1887	
W.T. Underwood House		Birmingham, Alabama	1887	

=== Maury & Dodd (1889–1895) ===
Name	Photo	Location	Date Commissioned	Notes
Southern Baptist Theological Seminary Memorial Library		Fifth and Broadway	1888–89	demolished in the 1960s
Louisville Baptist Orphans' Home Addition		northwest corner of First and St Catherine	1889	demolished
Charles T. Ballard House		1251 First Street	1889/1890	
Louisville Trust Company Building	Louisville Trust Building	308 Fifth Street	1890	contained sculptures and other works by Enid Yandell
Cave S. Ashbrook House		1037 S Third	1891	Demolished
Joshua Fry Bullitt, Jr. House		Big Stone Gap, Virginia	1891	
California Fig Syrup Company		Thirteenth and Lexington	1891	
Mrs. William Cornwall Jr. residence		521 West Oak	1891	demolished
Fifth Street Baptist Church (Covenant Presbyterian Church)		1901 W. Jefferson	1891	
Benjamin Flexner House		525 W Ormsby	1891	
J.A. Flexner House		531 W Ormsby	1891	
Miss Mary Lafon House		1343 (1505) Fourth Avenue	1891	demolished
T.A. Lyons House		1327 Brook	1891	
Dr. Joseph M. Mathews House		923 Fourth Street	1891	
Nelson County Courthouse		Bardstown, KY	1891	
George A. Newman House		1123 Third Street	1891	
Miss Belle Quigley House		1337 (1501) Fourth Avenue	1891	
Charles L. Robinson House		1334 Third Avenue	1891	
St. John's Episcopal Church		1115 West Jefferson street,	1891	Agudath Achim Synagogue (1927–1960) until demolition
Hopkins County Courthouse		Madisonville, Kentucky	1892	
William J. Dodd House		1469 St James Ct	1892	
Paul Cain House		1459 St James Ct	1892	
Sam Stone Bush House		230 Kenwood Hill Road	1893	
C.J.F. Allen House (alterations)		1371 (1523) Fourth Street	1893	
Curry Fertilizing		Buchanan and Washington Streets	1893	
F.H or Charles Hibbard House		Beechmont	1893	
H.M Caldwell House		Beechmont	1893	
The Kentucky Building	The official directory of the World's Columbian exposition, May 1st to October 30th, 1893. A reference book of exhibitors and exhibits; of the officers and members of the World's Columbian commission, (14580037647)	World's Columbian Exposition, Chicago	1893	demolished
Col Robert M. Martin residence and stables		Wilder Park	1893	lost in a fire around 1905
Macauley's flat building		Walnut Street, beside Stark's Building	1893	demolished
H. Straus Dry Goods House (alterations)		416–422 Market Street	1893	
H. Straus 6 residences		Second and Oak	1893	
Susette G. Stewart House		1208 First Street	1893	
George T. Wood House		1654 Cherokee Road	1893	
G.H. Moore (alterations)		(930) fourth street	1893	demolished
Edith Wilder(J.B. Wilder Trust)		519 W Main St	1893	demolished in 1979 for the Kentucky Center for the Arts building.
Harry McGoodwin House		1504 S Third Street	1893	
Adolph Rosenthal		Third near Oak	1893	
Presbyterian Church		Greenville, Kentucky	1893	
Block of residences (5) for Presbyterian Orphan's Home		Unknown	1893	
Cornelia Bush House		316 E. Kenwood Drive	1894	
C.J. Walton		Third and Hill	1894	
C.J. Walton		Third and Hill	1894	
John Otter		1329 (1429) S Third St	1894	
Standard Club		543(639) Fifth St	1894	
West End Baptist Church (St. Paul's Episcopal Church)		1400 South Fourth Street	1894	
T.H. Glover		(1417) Garvin Place	1894	demolished
Lockie Rhodes		Third and Hill	1894	
Columbia Trust (add)		Market, between Second and Third	1894	
Mary Curran (three residences)	Second and Breckenridge	1894		
J.S. Bockee		1230 Third Street (two brick and stone)	1895	
E. L. Brown House		1451 Fourth Street	1895	
J.W. Brown House		1455 Fourth Street	1895	
Joseph T. Burt House		Third Street near B (Bloom) Street	1895	possibly 1030 S Brook St
James Clarke House		1114 Third Street	1895	
Thomas Goudy House		Third and Hill	1895	
F. H. Higgins House		1517 Third Street (four residences)	1895	
Drs. Samuel W and James M Holloway office and flats		619(715) S Fourth	1895	demolished between 1912 and 1922
J.C. Hughes House		1467 St James Court	1895	
S. Jacobs store and flats		Market (7th and 8th)	1895	
William T. Johnston House		1457 Fourth Street	1895	
Dr. George W. Lewman House		1365 Third Street	1895	
Liederkanz Hall		601 Walnut Street	1895	
Ex. Stockdale House		1414 Third Street	1895	
H. Straus		218–236 Burnett Ave, 215–221 Burnett Ave	1895	
Patrick F. Walsh House		1397 Third Street	1895	
Design for a University Building		Unknown	1896	
Lucia Avenue School Building(Bloom Elementary)		1627 Lucia Avenue	1896	
Levering Gymnasium		711 S Fifth St (rear of Norton Hall)	1896	demolished
Design for a clubhouse		Memphis, Tennessee	Unknown	
Lagonda Club Building		Springfield, Ohio	1895	Principal designer: Frank Mills Andrews. NRHP Asset

=== Maury & Hillerich (1904–1909) ===
Name	Photo	Location	Date Commissioned	Notes
Mrs. M. Cassily House		Indiana	Unknown	
Mrs. H.R. Whiteside		Louisville, Kentucky	1907	
James A. Leech		Louisville, Kentucky	1907	
John H. Sale, ten story building		Fourth and Walnut	1907	

- Board of Trade Building
- The Tobacco Warehouse and Trading Company Building
- Underwriter's Reality Company Building
