= Reuben T. Durrett =

American lawyer and bibliographer (1824–1913)

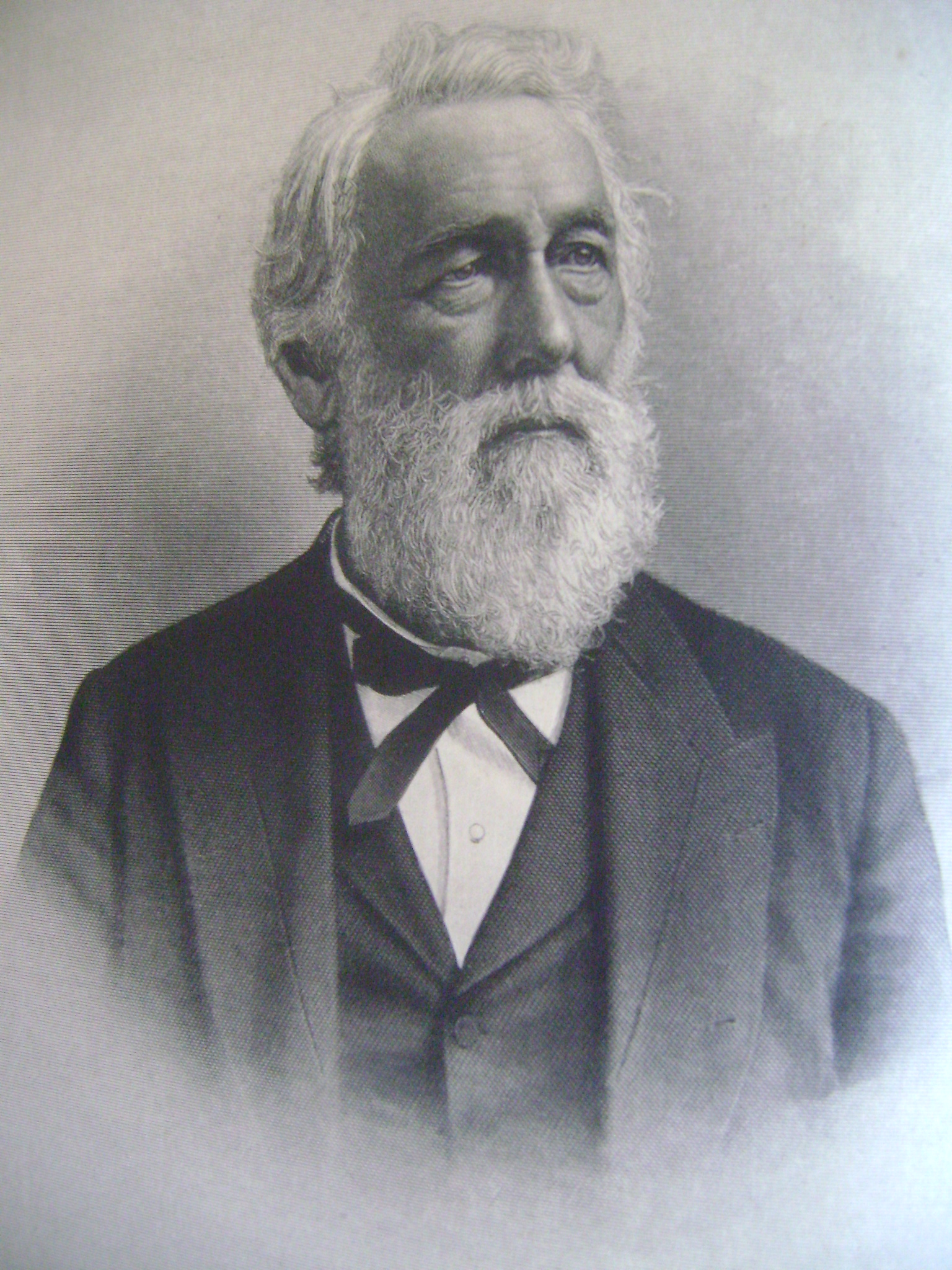
- Reuben T. Durrett in 1895
- Born: Reuben Thomas Durrett; January 22, 1824; Henry County, Kentucky, U.S.
- Died: September 16, 1913 (aged 89); Louisville, Kentucky, U.S.
- Resting place: Cave Hill Cemetery; Louisville, Kentucky, U.S.
- Other name: Col. Reuben T. Durrett
- Education: Georgetown College; Brown University; University of Louisville
- Occupation: Lawyer
- Known for: founder of the Louisville Public Library; Main organizer of Filson Historical Society
- Spouse: Elizabeth Humphreys Bates (m. 1852)
- Children: 4

Reuben Thomas Durrett (January 22, 1824 – September 16, 1913) was a lawyer, jurist, linguist, poet, editor, journalist, history writer, and Kentucky bibliographer. In 1871, Durrett founded the failed The Public Library of Kentucky. In 1884, Durrett founded the Filson Club, now the Filson Historical Society.

== Early life ==
Durrett was born January 22, 1824, in Henry County, Kentucky. Durrett was a son of William and Elizabeth Rawlings Durrett. His father, a wealthy farmer, built the first brick house in Henry County about 1813 some two miles north of New Castle and is where Durrett was born and raised. Francis Durrett, his paternal grandfather, served under George Rogers Clark during the Illinois campaign. After the campaign Francis went back to his home in Henry County, which was then part of Virginia.

Durrett is from French ancestors that can be traced back to a well known French physician named Louis Duret that lived in the sixteenth century. The American family line in the United States of all Durretts can trace their genealogy back to three brothers (John, Richard, and Bartholomew Durrett), descendants of Louis Duret that immigrated from England to Spotsylvania County, Virginia, in the eighteenth century.

Durrett's primary schooling as a boy was in Henry County. After graduating from high school, from 1844 until 1846, he attended Georgetown College some 50 miles away in Georgetown, Kentucky. Durrett then attended Brown University in Providence, Rhode Island. He earned a Bachelor's degree in 1849.

Durrett went then to the University of Louisville and took up courses in law. He earned a Bachelor of Laws degree in one year (1850), which was normally a two-year course of study. Durrett received an honorary Master's degree in 1853 from Brown University. In time he received from the three colleges he attended the Doctor of law honorary degree.

== Career ==
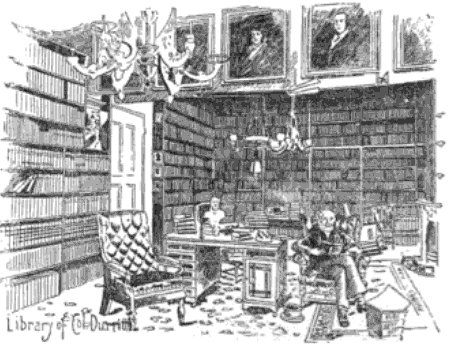
Durrett's personal library of 50,000 volumes

Durrett then practiced law in Louisville for almost thirty years after receiving his law degree. During his law career he served one term on the Louisville City Council and in 1852 campaigned for Winfield Scott for president. On July 21, 1857, Durrett was in a pistol duel with George D. Prentice over statements made between their two rival newspapers. In 1861 he spent a short time in prison for his views on secession. During the time he was a lawyer he obtained a half interest in Louisville Courier newspaper and was its editor until 1859.

Durrett was an avid collector of historical material, especially pertaining to Kentucky. He had an extensive library. In 1871 several citizens of Louisville were considering creating a local library. Some citizens thought a circulating library with an annual fee was a route to go. Durrett did a study on why libraries that charged for the use of books failed eventually. He had the viewpoint that books should be made available free to use by anyone. He drew up a library charter and created "The Public Library of Kentucky". He was the library's first president. Eventually this became the Louisville Free Public Library and it inherited Durrett's historical collection of rare books and historical material as its core collection.

Durrett wrote poetry in the 1850s and retired as a Louisville lawyer in 1880. His retirement hobby was that of writing and collecting historical material. In his historical activities he gathered friends and went on "historic excursions". These excursions consisted of trips throughout the Kentucky countryside using old authentic maps, some made by John Filson. It is believed that the notion for a local historical society was sparked when the 27th governor of Ohio, Charles Anderson, accompanied him and his friends on one of these excursions. On May 15, 1884, it was established that every first Monday of each month his friends would get together at Durrett's home library (Brook and Chestnut Streets). It eventually became the Filson Historical Society (a.k.a. The Filson Club). Its main purpose was the preserving of Kentucky history by collecting rare unpublished material. Durrett, being the main organizer, became its first president. Durrett's home became the meeting place of the club from 1884 to 1913. Many historians, including Theodore Roosevelt (Winning of the West), used The Filson Club and Durrett's library.

== Personal life ==
Durrett married Elizabeth Humphreys Bates from Cincinnati, Ohio, on December 16, 1852. They had four children. Durrett had one son that lived to adulthood, William T. Durrett, a medical doctor. His other children all died before he did.

- Lily Bates Durrett (1859 - 1881)
- Florence Montgomery Durrett (1863 - 1869)
- Reuben Thomas Durrett (1886 - 1890)

Durrett died in Louisville on September 16, 1913. He is buried at Cave Hill Cemetery of the same city.

== Legacy ==
Durett's manuscript collection was acquired by the University of Chicago Library in 1913. Also included was an important and large collection of rare books and periodicals. The collection is organized and divided into a dozen groups from "Pictures, Maps, and Sketches" to historical manuscripts and personal papers.

Durrett's Filson Club has changed its name to the Filson Historical Society and is now located in the Old Louisville neighborhood. The Filson Historical Society has a research facilities which includes a manuscript collection as well as a library that includes rare books, periodicals, maps, and other published materials. The Filson also maintains a small museum.

== Selected publications ==
- Night Scene at Drennon Springs (1850)
- Thoughts Over the Grave of Rev. Thomas Smith (1852)
- Old Year and New in the Coliseum at Rome (1856)
- John Filson, the First Historian of Kentucky (1884)
- The [Kentucky] Resolutions of 1798 and 1799 (1886)
- An Historical Sketch of St. Paul's Church, Louisville, Ky (1889)
- The Centenary of Kentucky (1892)
- The centenary of Louisville (1893)
- Public Library Paper: Supplement (1893)
- The Romance of the Origin of Louisville (1894)
- Boonesborough. Its Founding, Pioneer Struggles, Indian Experiences, Transylvania Days, and Revolutionary Annals (1901)
- Introduction to The Battle of New Orleans; Including the Previous Engagements Between the Americans and the British, the Indians, and the Spanish, which Led to the Final Conflict on the 8th of January, 1815 by Z. F. Smith (1904)
- The Quest for a Lost Race (1907)
- Traditions of the Earliest Visits of Foreigners to North America, the First Formed and First Inhabited of the Continents (1908)

== Bibliography ==
- Alderman, Edwin Anderson (1909). Library of Southern Literature: Biography. Martin & Hoyt Company. p. 1457.
- Kleber, John E. (2001). The Encyclopedia of Louisville. University Press of Kentucky. ISBN 978-0-8131-2890-0.
- National Americana Society (1913). Americana. National Americana Society.
- Stanley, Bradley (1892). The Builders of the Nation: A History of the United States, Including Portraits and Biographies of Presidents, Cabinet Officers, Statesmen, Legislators, Jurists, Educators, Authors, Editors, and Divines. Stanley-Bradley Publishing Company.
- White, James Terry (1895). The National Cyclopaedia of American Biography. J.T. White.
