= The Filson Club History Quarterly =

- Language: English

Publication details
- History: 1926–2002
- Frequency: Quarterly

Standard abbreviations
- ISO 4: Filson Club Hist. Q.

Indexing
- The Historical Quarterly
- LCCN: 88657027
- The Filson Club History Quarterly
- ISSN: 0015-1874
- LCCN: 28000524
- OCLC no.: 6674913
- Filson History Quarterly
- ISSN: 1536-0490
- LCCN: 2001233824
- OCLC no.: 46866752

The Filson Club History Quarterly was an academic journal of American history (focusing on history of the Ohio Valley and Kentucky) published by the Filson Historical Society. It was originally established as The Historical Quarterly in 1926 by Robert S. Cotterill, to supplement The Filson Club Publications, a series of monographs published by the club. Other editors of the journal include Otto A. Rothert (1928–1945), Lucien Beckner (1946), Richard H. Hill (1947–1971), Robert E. McDowell, Jr. (1971–1975), Nelson L. Dawson (1975–?).

The journal took the name The Historical Quarterly of the Filson Club in 1929, and The Filson Club History Quarterly the following year. It took the name Filson History Quarterly for its last two volumes (vol. 75 and 76) in 2001 and 2002. The journal was absorbed by Ohio Valley History, published by the Cincinnati Historical Society, in 2003.

In 2010, all articles were digitized and are now accessible through the Filson Club website.
