= Louisville Free Public Library, Western Branch =

- Louisville Free Public Library, Western Colored Branch
- U.S. National Register of Historic Places
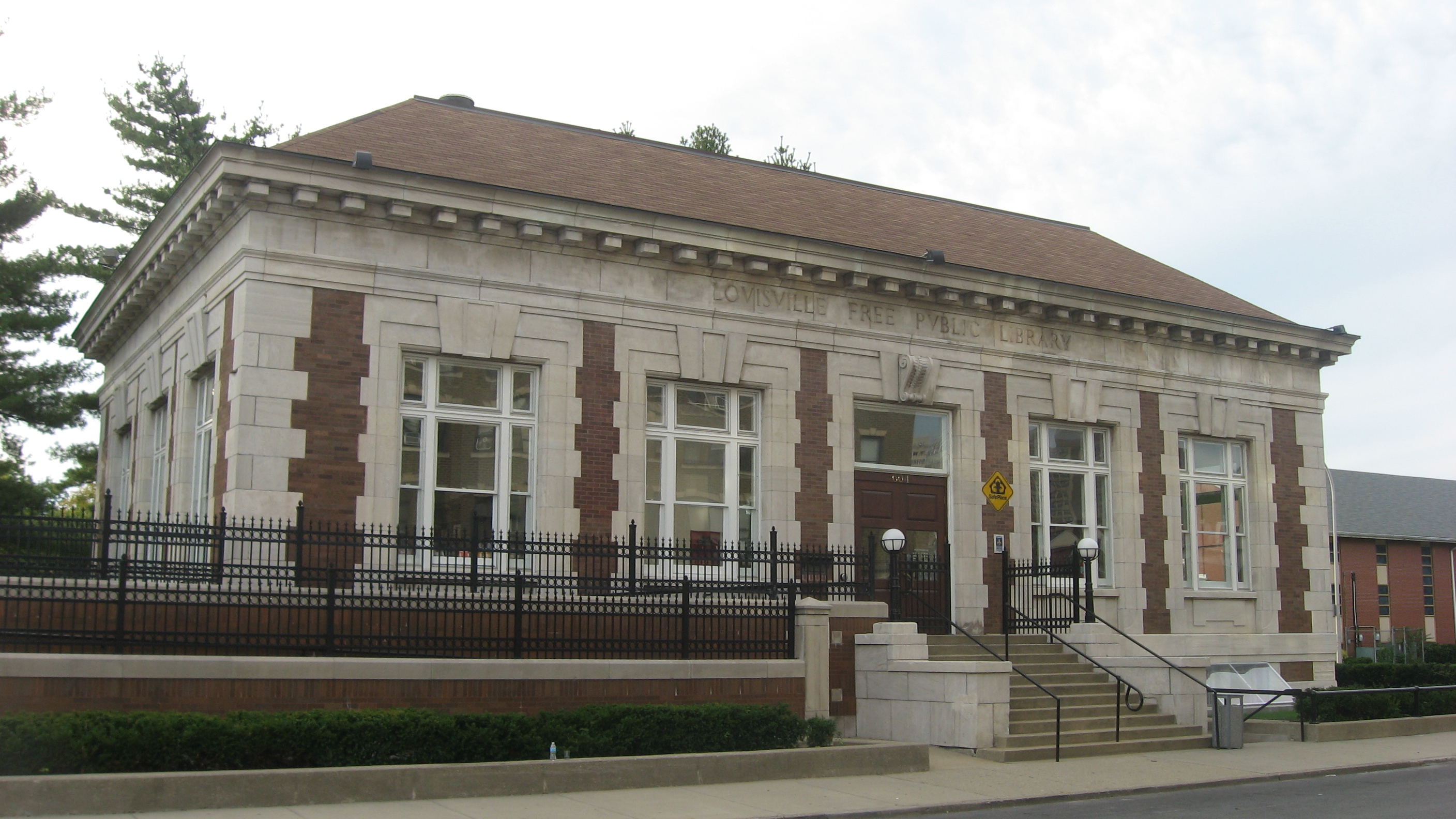
- Front of the library

- Location within Kentucky Location within the United States
- Location: 604 S. 10th St., Louisville, Kentucky
- Coordinates: 38°14′59″N 85°46′3″W
- Area: less than one acre
- Built: 1907
- Architect: McDonald & Dodd; Lortz & Frey Planing Mill Co.
- Architectural style: Beaux Arts
- NRHP reference No.: 75000771
- Added to NRHP: December 6, 1975

The Louisville Free Public Library's Western Branch or Western Library is a public library in Louisville, Kentucky. It is a Carnegie library and is the first public library built for African Americans staffed entirely by African Americans. (Note: It is not however the first Carnegie library built for African-Americans. Built in 1907 and opened the following year, it is predated by an academic library which opened in 1902 at the institution now known as Tuskegee University (a historically black university).) Previously known as Louisville Free Public Library, Western Colored Branch, and registered as a historic site in that name, it is a branch of the Louisville Free Public Library system. It is listed on the National Register of Historic Places.

== History ==
The Western Colored Branch library first opened in September 1905 and was originally located at 1125 West Chestnut Street. At the time it was common for black libraries to be housed in rented or converted private facilities; when the Western Colored Branch first opened it was operated in three rented rooms in a private home.

Albert Ernest Meyzeek, principal of Central High School at the time, was concerned about the lack of adequate reading and reference materials at the school. He challenged the 1902 legislation that created the Louisville Free Public Library system, on the basis that it did not adequately serve African Americans, and persuaded the city council to open a branch to fill this need. Meyzeek later pushed for a second black library, the Eastern Colored Branch (which opened in 1914).

=== Carnegie's involvement ===
In 1908, industrialist Andrew Carnegie donated funds to build a new library building. As a result, the Western Colored Branch became the first public library for African Americans in the American South that was housed in a Carnegie-funded facility. The new library building was designed by McDonald & Dodd.

The building is 75 by 45 feet (23 m × 14 m) in plan, and is built of brick with stone trim.

The library was well received by the community. It marked a new level of civic engagement by "the emerging, turn-of-the-century, southern black middle class" which was determined to "build positive community infrastructures for purposes of racial uplift."

=== Early success (1910s-1930s) ===
Several prominent African-American librarians worked in the Western Branch and assisted in education and outreach programs for the local black community. Of particular note are Reverend Thomas Fountain Blue, who served as the administrative head of the Western and Eastern Colored Branches as well as Rachel Davis Harris, who served as the children's library specialist and chief assistant. Blue and Harris were influential in providing services to Louisville's African American community during the Jim Crow era. In 1917, about 12,000 people attended 498 meetings at both branches. Blue created a community outreach strategy, he said the library was much more than a place to store books. “With its reading and study rooms, its lecture and classrooms, it forms a center from which radiate many influences for general betterment. The people feel that the library belongs to them, and that it may be used for anything that makes for their welfare.”

The two branches (Western and Eastern) became community social centers and regional models for other libraries like it. The library included a Children's Department, which developed story time, debates, and special events. The library also held an annual spelling bee with Cup winners and cash rewards sponsored by Joseph S. Cotter Sr., a local black educator. The prominent Douglass Debate Club for high school boys, which argued civil rights topics, studied and cooperated with this branch.

The library also helped set up forty classroom collections at eleven African American city and county schools. By 1935 this had expanded to eighty classroom collections as well as library services administered at two junior high schools and the development of 15 deposit stations. From 1912 to 1931, Blue also organized and held an apprenticeship librarian class, which was the "only opportunity for formal training for prospective black librarians" until the Hampton Library School was opened in 1925 in Virginia.

=== Recent developments ===
The library was listed on the National Register of Historic Places in 1975. In 2001, Prince anonymously donated $12,000 to keep the library from closure.

Today, the library is home to the African-American Archives, a collection of historical documents and resources focusing on African-American narratives and experiences. Also within the Archives are documents belonging to Reverend Blue and Joseph S. Cotter Sr., as well as his son, the poet Joseph Cotter Jr.

== See also ==
- Carnegie Branch Library (Meridian, Mississippi) has been asserted to be the only Carnegie library ever built for African Americans in the US. There are in fact 12 Carnegie libraries that were built to serve black residents. Louisville's Western branch was the first.
