= Kaufman-Straus =

- Kaufman-Straus Building
- U.S. National Register of Historic Places
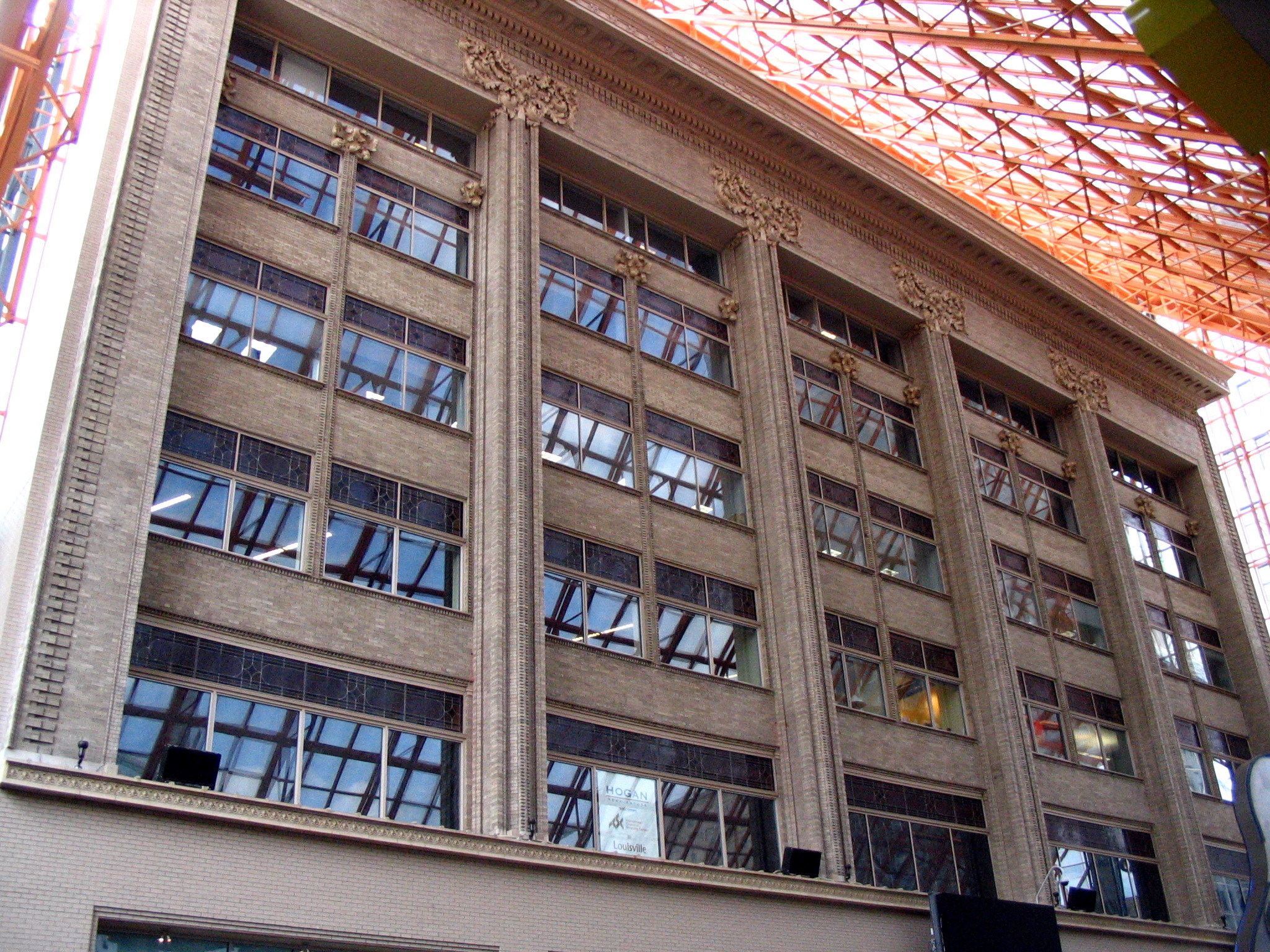

- Location within Kentucky Location within the United States
- Location: 427-437 S. 4th St., Louisville, Kentucky
- Coordinates: 38°15′7″N 85°45′26″W
- Area: 0.5 acres (0.20 ha)
- Built: 1902
- Architect: Maury, Mason
- Architectural style: Late 19th And Early 20th Century American Movements
- NRHP reference No.: 78001357
- Added to NRHP: February 14, 1978

Kaufman-Straus was a local department store that operated in Louisville, Kentucky, from 1879 to 1969. In 1879, local retail clerk Henry Kaufman opened the first store on Jefferson between 7th and 8th. Four years later, Benjamin Straus entered into partnership with Kaufman. In 1887, the Kaufman-Straus store moved to South 4th Street in space leased from the Polytechnic Society of Kentucky. The new flagship store opened in 1903, at 533-49 South 4th Street, designed by local architect Mason Maury. In 1924, Kaufman-Straus was acquired by City Stores Company and the following year the flagship store underwent extensive renovations. City Stores rebranded the company as Kaufman's in 1960. It operated two stores in suburban Louisville at The Mall and Dixie Manor. In 1969, Kaufman's was acquired by L. S. Ayres, and the downtown Louisville store was subsequently closed in 1971.

The flagship store was added to the National Register of Historic Places in 1983. It is a six-story building.
