= Columbia Building (Louisville, Kentucky) =

Skyscraper in Louisville, Kentucky, US

Coordinates: 38.2571°N 85.7570°W

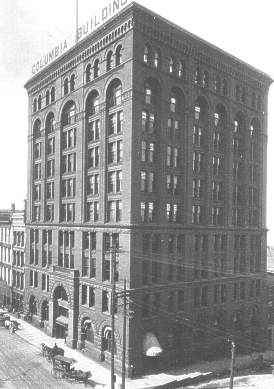
The Columbia Building in 1910

The Columbia Building, originally named the Commerce Building, was Louisville, Kentucky's second skyscraper, designed by Cornelius Curtin and completed in 1890 at a cost of $1 million. It was located at the northwest corner of Fourth and Main streets and built of pressed red brick in the Romanesque Revival style. It was built just five years after the world's first skyscraper, the Home Insurance Building in Chicago. It had 10 stories and a height of 162 feet.

The Columbia was first called the Commercial Club Building, and was the tallest building in Louisville for over a decade. It was demolished in 1966 as a part of a downtown redevelopment plan, and a 24-story highrise, now called the BB&T Building, was built on the site in 1972.

== See also ==
- History of Louisville, Kentucky

Preceded by Kenyon Building	Tallest Building in Louisville; 1890-1905	Succeeded by Lincoln Savings Bank Building
