= Thomas Fountain Blue =

American librarian (1866–1935)

- Born: March 6, 1866; Farmville, Virginia
- Died: November 10, 1935; Louisville, Kentucky
- Education: Hampton Normal and Agricultural Institute; Richmond Theological Seminary
- Occupations: Librarian, educator

Thomas Fountain Blue (March 6, 1866 – November 10, 1935) was a minister, educator, and civic leader who led the Colored Branches of the Louisville Free Public Library (LFPL) and was an early trainer of African-American librarians. Blue was the first African-American to head a public library and his efforts led to the Louisville Free Public Library being nationally recognized as a leader in segregated library administration and education for African Americans.

== Early years ==
Thomas Fountain Blue was the second child of Noah Hedgeman Blue and Henry Ann Crawley, both former slaves. Blue attended Hampton Normal and Agricultural Institute from 1885 to 1888, after which he taught school in Virginia. In 1894 he enrolled at Richmond Theological Seminary, graduating in April 1898 with a Bachelor of Divinity. During the Spanish–American War, Blue served in the Sixth Virginia Volunteers and was stationed in Camp Poland in Tennessee and Camp Haskell in Georgia. After the war he moved to Louisville, Kentucky, where he was in charge of the Colored Branch of the Louisville Young Men's Christian Association and served on a number of civic associations, including as a charter member of the Louisville Chapter of the Association for the Study of African American Life and History.

== Library career ==
Blue became the first African-American to head a public library in 1905. The Western Colored Branch was the first Carnegie colored library in Louisville, Kentucky. it was the first public library in the nation to serve African-American patrons with an exclusively African-American staff. In 1914 he was also made Librarian in charge of the newly opened Eastern Colored Branch of LFPL. Blue became known for the high value he placed on training library personnel:

Early in the history of the two Negro branch libraries, apprentice classes were conducted with the assistance of department heads from the Main Free Public Library. At this time there were no facilities in the South for training Negro librarians and several cities sent persons to Louisville for training.

— William R. Breyer and Edward L. Kinkade, Libraries and lotteries: a history of the Louisville Free Public Library (1944), page 122.

These classes were the first library training program for African Americans in the United States. Blue was dedicated to cultivating the library as a space for the use of the community; social clubs frequently made use of the Western and Eastern Colored Branches.

From 1919 to his death in 1935 Blue was the director of all library work for African Americans in Louisville, including work bringing library collections to seventeen schools in the Jefferson County area. At the American Library Association conference in 1922, Blue presented information about his training class; he was the first African American to be on an ALA program. Blue was the founder of the Negro Library Conference, which was first held at Blue's alma mater Hampton Institute in March 1927. The Negro library training program that Blue established at LFPL continued as the Hampton Library School. The Louisville apprenticeship program ended in the early 1930s when professional library schools began to fill the gap of educating librarians. Blue died November 10, 1935; a resolution passed later that month by the Louisville Free Public Library Board of Trustees referred to him as "a trusted, loyal and highly competent administrator" and "a pioneer in this field of public service among Colored People".

In 2003, the American Library Association passed a resolution recognizing "the leadership role of Reverend Thomas Fountain Blue in laying the foundation for the continued presence of African American libraries, library students, and library employees in all types of libraries within the United States and abroad".

== Personal life ==
Blue married Cornelia Phillips Johnson in 1925; they had two sons together. Through his marriage he was the brother-in-law of Lyman T. Johnson, an educator and advocate for racial desegregation in Kentucky. Blue continued to be a preacher and church leader throughout his life.
