= Louisville Free Public Library =

Public library system

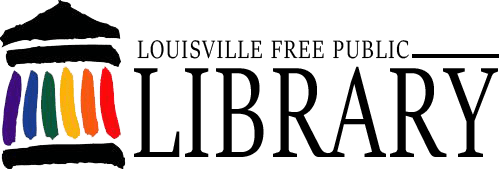
- Location: Louisville, Kentucky
- Type: Public Library
- Established: 1902
- Reference to legal mandate: KRS 173.105
- Branches: 17

Collection
- Size: 1,208,715

Access and use
- Circulation: 4,338,862
- Population served: 771,158
- Members: 316,153

Other information
- Budget: $23,221,100 (FY '23)
- Director: Heather Lowe
- Employees: 307
- Affiliation: AFSCME Local 3425
- Website: lfpl.org

The Louisville Free Public Library (LFPL) is the public library system in Louisville, Kentucky, and the largest public library system in the U.S. state of Kentucky.

== History ==
=== Formation ===
The Louisville Free Public Library was created in 1902 by an act of the Kentucky State Legislature, and in 1904 it merged with the Polytechnic Society of Kentucky. Services began in 1905 when the Polytechnic Society's collection, held in the top floor of the Kaufman-Straus Building, was open to the public. Although the Main Library was completed in 1906, patron services did not officially begin until 1908. After eight years of controversy, the privately run Polytechnic Society of Kentucky relinquished its property to the new public library in 1913.

Additional branches were added over time, including the Western Colored Branch, which was the first Carnegie-housed library in the U.S. built solely for African Americans. Thomas Fountain Blue was appointed head of the Colored Branch in 1905 as well as the Eastern Colored Branch when it opened in 1914; he also started the first library training program for African Americans in the United States. At one time LFPL had over 30 branches, but a number of them were forced to close due to lack of funding. Currently, there are 16 branches, in addition to the main library site. Internet services and inter-library loan have helped to make up for having fewer branches.

=== Flood of 1937 ===
The infamous Flood of 1937 damaged both the Portland and Main branches. Since 1908 a museum was opened to the public in the basement of the York Street branch. After the devastating flood, the museum was temporary relocated to the Monserrat school. In 1971, the museum moved downtown to West Main Street to become what is now the Kentucky Science Center.

=== Public radio in the 1950s ===
In 1950, the library established WFPL ("Free Public Library") as an educational radio station and then opened WFPK as a classical radio station in 1954. The library was the first library in the nation to put its own FM-radio station on the air. Both were donated in 1993 to help found Louisville Public Media.

=== Tax referendum of 2007 ===
In 2007, a proposed tax increase to pay for Louisville Free Public Library improvements and ongoing costs was soundly defeated in spite of strong support by many political and business leaders. Nonetheless, with the help of the Library Foundation and community support, a new education and technology-driven, $1.9 million branch library was completed and opened in the Newburg area (a traditionally underserved community) in August 2009.

=== Flood of 2009 ===
In early August 2009 the main branch was flooded when a storm dropped 7 inches (18 cm) of water on the city in 75 minutes. The library servers, bookmobiles, offices, and processing rooms were under 6 feet (180 cm) of water. 50,000 books were destroyed, and the building severely damaged, with a total estimate of $5 million. Structural, mechanical, electrical, and computer systems damage were near complete, forcing the main library to close for several weeks. Other branches in the system in hard-hit areas were closed for a few days while damage was assessed and cleanup undertaken. The library system itself remained open for business throughout the event. The last time the main building had flooded was in the Ohio River flood of 1937. Three other branches of the library system were damaged or affected in the flooding as well: Bon Air Regional Branch, Iroquois Branch, and Shawnee Branch libraries. Despite the level of damage, library services at all branches, including the main, were able to return to near full service.

== Branches ==
The Main Library serves as a central hub to the library system, including facilities, content management, and administration. In addition to the Main Library, LFPL has 17 branch libraries. The main library was listed on the National Register of Historic Places in 1980.

Name	Photo	Location
Main Library		301 York St, Louisville, Kentucky 40203
Bon Air		2816 Del Rio Pl. Louisville, Kentucky 40220
Crescent Hill		2762 Frankfort Ave., Louisville, KY 40206
Fairdale		10620 W. Manslick Rd, Louisville, KY 40118
Highlands-Shelby Park		1250 Bardstown Rd., #4, Louisville, KY 40204
Iroquois		601 W. Woodlawn Ave., Louisville, KY 40215
Jeffersontown		10635 Watterson Trail, Louisville, KY 40299
Middletown		12556 Shelbyville Road, Louisville, KY 40243
Newburg		4800 Exeter Ave., Louisville, KY 40218
Northeast Regional		15 Bellevoir Circle, Louisville, KY 40223
Parkland		2743 Virginia Ave, Louisville, KY 40211
Portland		3305 Northwestern Pkwy, Louisville, KY 40212
St. Matthews		3940 Grandview Ave., Louisville, KY 40207
Shawnee		3912 West Broadway, Louisville, KY 40211
Shively		3920 Dixie Highway, Louisville, KY 40216
South Central Regional		7300 Jefferson Boulevard, Louisville, KY 40219
Southwest Regional		9725 Dixie Highway, Louisville, KY 40272
Western		604 South Tenth Street, Louisville, KY 40203

== Staff unionization ==
The majority of LFPL's employees are employed through a collective bargaining agreement between AFSCME Local 3425 and Louisville Metro Government.

== See also ==
- Bennett H. Young, founder.
- Mayor Charles F. Grainger, founder.
- Marilla Waite Freeman, the library's Head of Reference from its opening until 1910, who would go on to become one of the most well-known librarians in the country
