= Louisville Free Public Library, Crescent Hill Branch =

- Crescent Hill Branch Library
- U.S. National Register of Historic Places
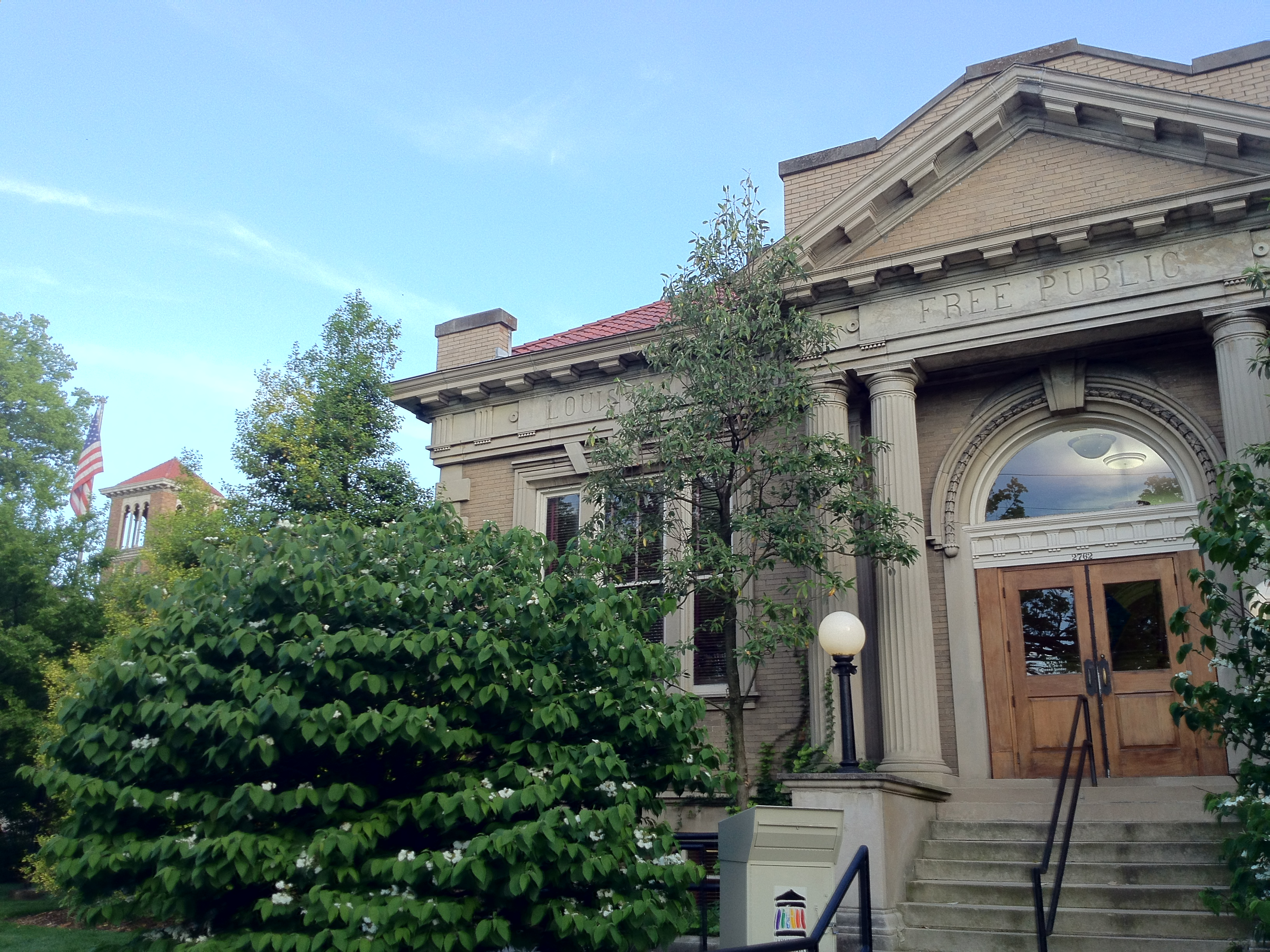

- Location within Kentucky Location within the United States
- Location: Louisville, Kentucky
- Coordinates: 38°15′15.98″N 85°41′28.58″W
- Built: 1908
- Architect: Thomas & Bohne
- Architectural style: Beaux Arts
- NRHP reference No.: 81000282
- Added to NRHP: March 10, 1981

The Crescent Hill Branch Library, constructed in 1908 in Louisville, Kentucky, was one of the first of nine Carnegie-endowed libraries built in Louisville, and is a branch of the Louisville Free Public Library. The building has a Beaux-Arts architecture style created by the Thomas & Bohne architect firm. The west side of the library was added in 1961 and the entire library was renovated in 1988. It was added to the National Register of Historic Places in 1981 for its architectural significance and the educational impact on the community up to 1924.

== Renovation ==
In 1988 the library began its renovation process and didn't reopen to the public until March 24, 1994, with a gala reception. During the renovation progress, library materials were stored at the Masonic Home on Frankfort Avenue and remained available for use by the public.

== Public relations ==
The library has a longstanding relationship with the community. Sallie T. Berryman, the second librarian, began in 1909 and stayed for 30 years. She started the first story hour, night classes, boy's and girl's clubs, a child health clinic, and two groups that would become the Crescent Hill Women's Club. In 1922 a memorial was created commemorating Crescent Hill residents that died in World War I.

The library also has public Wi-Fi available.
