= Clarksdale Housing Complex =

Former public housing project in Kentucky, United States

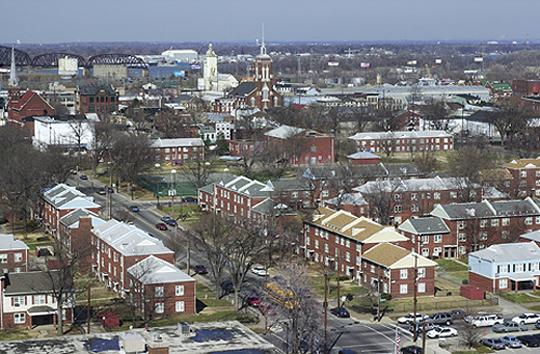
- Arial View of Clarksdale Housing Complex
- Interactive map of Clarksdale Housing Complex

General information
- Location: Louisville, Kentucky
- Coordinates: 38°15′03″N 85°44′29″W
- Status: Demolished
- No. of units: 728

Construction
- Constructed: 1939

Listing
- Demolished: 2005
- Replaced by: Liberty Green Homes

Other information
- Governing body: Louisville Metro Housing Authority

The Clarksdale Housing Complex was a housing project located in Louisville, Kentucky, directly east of downtown in the Phoenix Hill neighborhood.

== History ==
The Clarksdale Housing Complex was a public housing project built in 1939. Clarksdale was occupied from 1939 to late 2004. It was the first public housing complex built in the city, and up until its demolition, completed in 2005, it was the largest public housing project in the state of Kentucky. It consisted of 58 two- and three-story buildings. Like most public housing complexes, Clarksdale was initially built to support veterans and their families after World War II. Clarksdale was originally built for and occupied by white tenants, while Beecher Terrace, built several years later, was designed for blacks. However, entering the mid-1960s, Clarksdale's population slowly became predominantly black around the same time white flight began in the West End of Louisville. Until its demise, Clarksdale was one of many developments overseen by the Louisville Metro Housing Authority, which primarily served as housing for single-family units with low income.

Clarksdale's location was bounded by Jefferson Street to the North, Jackson Street to the West, Muhammad Ali Boulevard to the South, and Shelby Street to the East. It was located adjacent to its sister complex, Dosker Manor, which initially served as a complex for the elderly and is still standing today. St. Boniface Catholic Church, which also still stands today, was positioned within the boundaries of the complex on East Liberty Street. Both Clarksdale and Dosker Manor's locations also mark the eastern boundary line of downtown into what is known as the Phoenix Hill neighborhood of Louisville. The northern end of Phoenix Hill, especially along East Market and Jefferson Streets has been funded and developed by private business owners into what developers call "NuLu" (short for New Louisville), although the historical name for the area geographically is Phoenix Hill and East Market District.

As with most housing projects throughout the country, Clarksdale's age and maintenance were insufficient for such a large complex designed for single-family and low-income households. Clarksdale, in its prime, was one of the most notorious and crime-ridden housing projects within the city, with high drug activity, murder, and gang activity prevalent.

== Redevelopment ==
The 65-year-old complex was completely demolished in 2005 as part of the city's plan to redevelop housing in the downtown area due to Louisville's rapid economic growth within the downtown business district. The Clarksdale complex was the second public housing site in Louisville to undergo this process, after the Cotter/Lang Homes revitalization into what is now known as The Villages of Park Duvalle. This redevelopment plan was part of the Hope VI program responsible for the same revitalization of Chicago's Plan for Transformation as the demolition of housing projects in other major cities throughout the United States. East Louisville Park and two local liquor and grocery stores were also absolved of the process per eminent domain laws and the approval of the council. People came to realize that the area surrounding this publicly owned property was an epicenter for crime and a very high risk to public safety.

Tenants from Clarksdale were forced to relocate to other areas and other housing projects throughout the city, which often brought tension and issues with original residents from those particular areas. The newly redeveloped area, which is the prior site of Clarksdale, is now known as Liberty Green, named after Liberty Street, which ran directly through the middle of the complex West to East. The name Liberty Green also stems from the area in the late 19th century, which was rich with green fields. Liberty Green is nearing completion. However, building has halted on the eastern edge of the complex, and only vacant lots sit east of Clay Street to Shelby, with the exception of one row of housing facing Muhammad Ali Boulevard.

Prior to the demolition, many tenants argued that due to Clarksdale's close proximity to Downtown Louisville, that location became the prime factor of the revitalization more so than crime, which was proposed as one of the main purposes for the demolition. Many tenants who opposed the demolition have argued that with the growth, expansion, and development of downtown attractions such as Fourth Street Live!, an abundance of newly developed high-end apartments and condos, KFC Yum! Center, and Louisville Waterfront Park, having Clarksdale in the immediate area would cause concerns with property and retail value for such attractions, therefore raising questions about the safety of patrons, tourists, and citizens as a whole. Ironically, since the demise of Clarksdale and other housing projects in the city from these redevelopment plans, Louisville's crime and murder rate have now risen to an all-time high as a whole and in other parts of the city, particularly the West End, which were very high already. Crime has also risen in areas of the city where crime was almost nonexistent before, particularly certain areas of the Highlands, the South End, and smaller areas within the East End.

Today, a local TV repair shop and family-owned business, Clarksdale TV, located nearby on South Shelby Street and Broadway, along with a one-block alley between South Campbell and South Wenzel Streets near East Madison in Phoenix Hill, are the only remnants bearing the Clarksdale name within the city of Louisville.
