= David Armstrong Extreme Park =

Public skatepark near downtown Louisville, Kentucky

Coordinates: 38°15′25.29″N 85°44′24.89″W

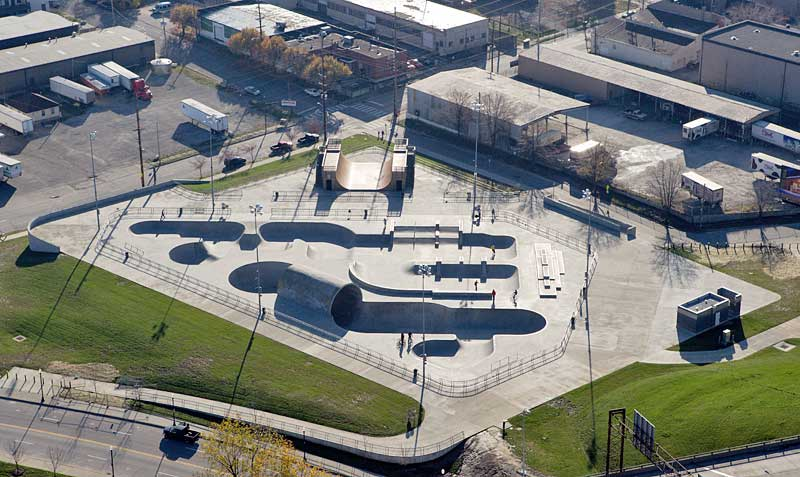
David Armstrong Extreme Park

The David Armstrong Extreme Park, formerly called the Louisville Extreme Park, is a 40,000 square foot (3,700 m^{2}) public skatepark located near downtown Louisville, Kentucky, United States, in the Butchertown neighborhood. It opened on April 5, 2002, and gained national recognition after the release of Tony Hawk's Gigantic Skatepark Tour, in which the park was featured. The park was designed Metro Parks with the input of a local task force under the guidance of project managers Mark Dutrow and Martha Berner. The public skatepark is owned by Louisville Metro Government and operated by Metro Parks.

In 2014, about one-third of the park was demolished, to be followed by the rebuilding of facilities on adjacent property, to make way for flyover ramps to support the new Abraham Lincoln Bridge. The rebuild was completed on April 14, 2015, where the park was dedicated in former Louisville Mayor David L. Armstrong's honor.

In 2023, it was announced that the park would be closing at 11PM every night, transitioning to a limited operating schedule for the first time since the park opened. This was a response to a rise in criminal activity and increased need for police presence at the park during late-night hours. At this time, several cameras were installed to enforce the curfew, and better monitor the park during operating hours.

== Park features ==
The park is known for its 24-foot (7.3 m) full pipe, but it also has other features, including two 11-foot (3.4 m) bowls, two 8-foot (2.4 m) bowls, two 4-foot (1.2 m) bowls, a 6-foot (1.8 m) bowl, a few fun boxes, a street course, a 6-foot (1.8 m) flat bank, several ledges, rails, and endless lines. It also has a 12-foot (3.7 m) wooden vert ramp with a 13-foot (4.0 m) extension. There are also publicly accessible restrooms and emergency telephones.

== See also ==
- List of attractions and events in the Louisville metropolitan area
- List of parks in the Louisville metropolitan area
