= Downtown Louisville =

Central business district in Kentucky, U.S.

Coordinates: 38°15′28.21″N 85°45′41.99″W

- Central business district
- Interactive map of Downtown Louisville
- Country: United States
- State: Kentucky
- County: Jefferson
- City: Louisville

Population (2015)
  - Total: 4,700
- Time zone: UTC−5 (EST)
  - Summer (DST): UTC−4 (EDT)
- ZIP Codes: 40202, 40203
- Area code: 502
- Website: louisvilleky.gov

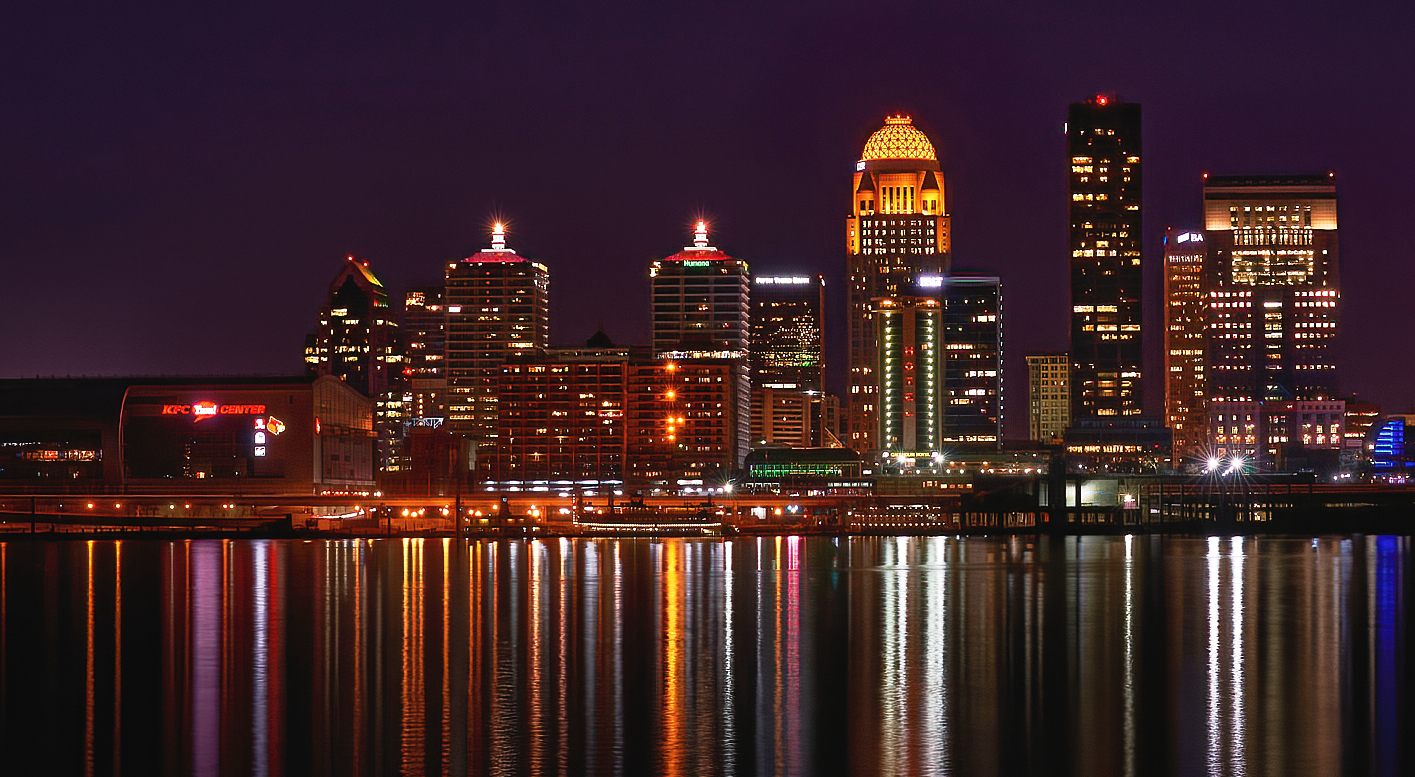
The Louisville skyline

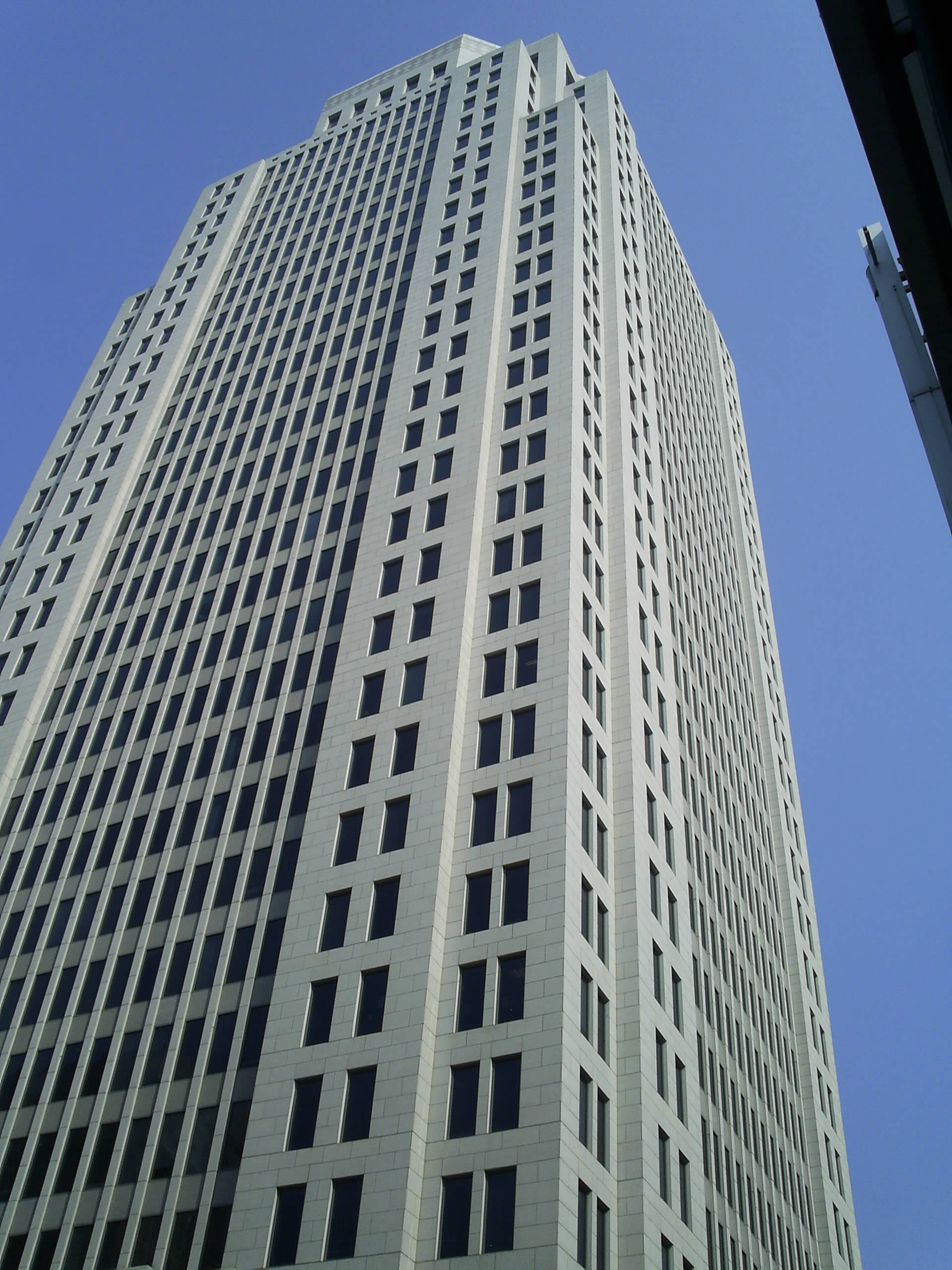
400 West Market

Downtown Louisville is the central business district of Louisville, Kentucky, the largest such in the state, as well as the urban hub of the Louisville metropolitan area. Its boundaries are the Ohio River to the north, Hancock Street to the east, York and Jacob Streets to the south, and 9th Street to the west. As of 2015, the population of downtown Louisville was 4,700.

The Central Business District is made up of five areas:

- West Main District (west of 2nd St., north of Market St., east of 9th St., and south of the Ohio River)
- East Main District (east of 2nd St., north of Market St., west of Hancock St., and south of the Ohio River; contains the Whiskey Row Historic District)
- Medical Center (east of 2nd St., south of Market St., west of Hancock St., and north of Jacob St.)
- Fourth St. District (south of Market St., west of 2nd St., north of York St., and east of 5th St.)
- Civic Center (south of Market St., west of 5th St., north of York St., and east of 9th St.)

The tallest buildings in Kentucky are located in downtown Louisville and include 400 West Market designed by John Burgee, PNC Tower designed by Harrison & Abramovitz, PNC Plaza designed by Welton Becket, and the Humana Building designed by Michael Graves. Of the 16 buildings in Kentucky over 300 feet (91 m), 12 are in downtown Louisville. In addition, it is the center of local and regional government.

A glassed-in skywalk called the Louie Link stretches six city blocks and links together the Kentucky International Convention Center (KICC), Fourth Street Live!, three hotels (Galt House Hotel & Suites, Marriott and Hyatt Regency), and 2,300 hotel rooms. In 2010 it was extended from the Galt House to the new $16 million Skywalk Garage, an eight-level, 860-space parking facility on Third Street, and a second skywalk connects from the garage across Third Street to the new KFC Yum! Center.

== History ==
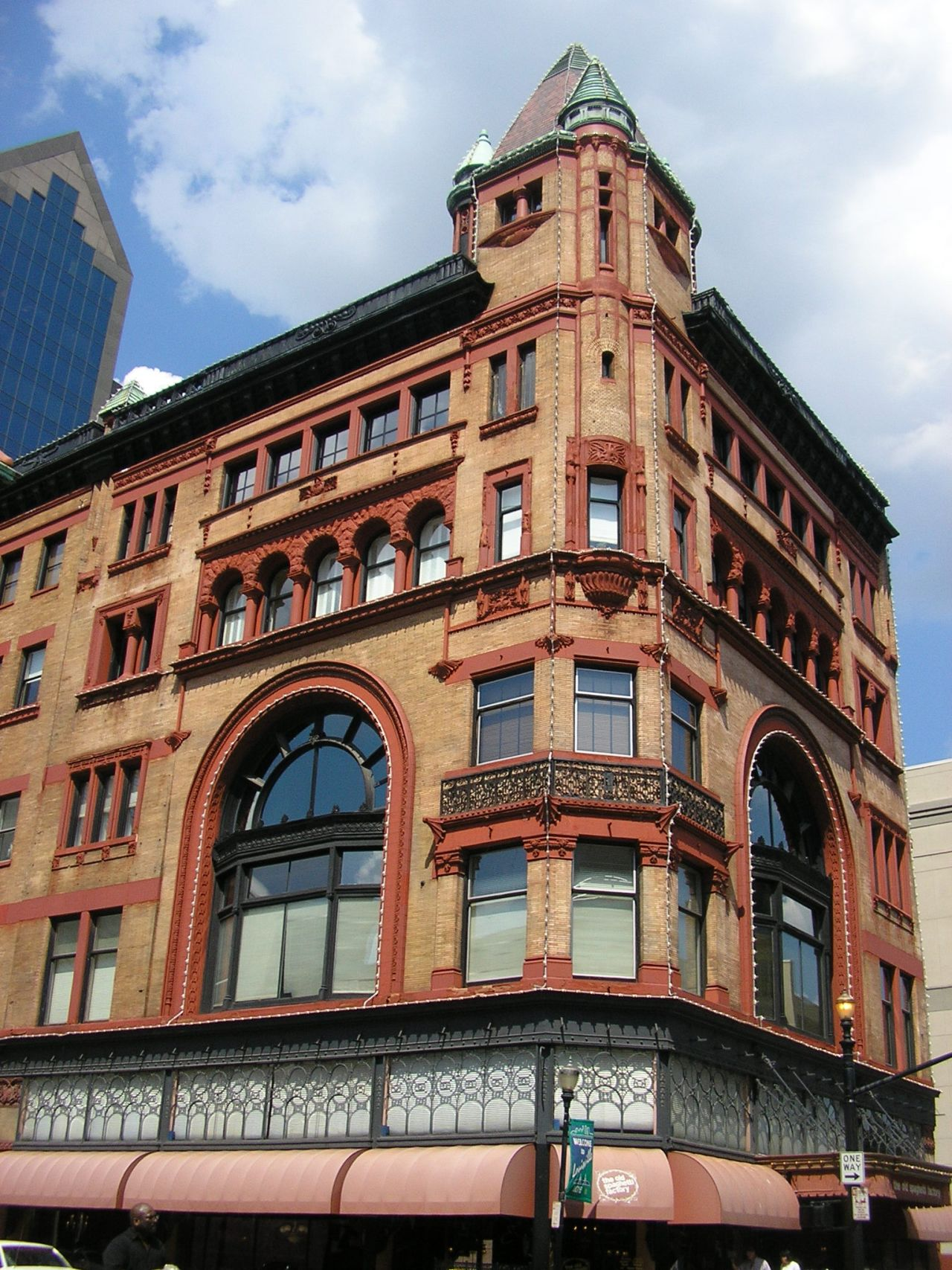
The Richardsonian Romanesque Levy Building, built in 1893, an example of downtown Louisville's classic architecture and revitalization; the upper four floors have been converted to 23 loft condominiums

Downtown Louisville is the oldest part of the city of Louisville, whose initial development was closely tied to the Ohio River. The largest early fort, Fort Nelson, was built in 1781 near what is today the corner of 7th and Main streets. Many early residents lived nearby after moving out of the forts by the mid-1780s, although little remains of the earliest (mostly wood) structures.

Early plans of the city, such as William Pope's original plan in 1783, show a simple grid on an east–west axis along the river. The earliest streets, Main, Market and Jefferson retain their original names from the plan, while the smaller Green Street is now known as Liberty (it was renamed after Green Street acquired a seedy reputation due to its many burlesque theaters). Main Street was the city's initial commercial hub for nearly a century.

By 1830, Louisville passed Lexington as Kentucky's largest city, with a population over 10,000. The steamboat era saw the opening of the Louisville and Portland Canal just west of downtown, and local commerce picked up further with the founding of banks and manufacturing. Most of Louisville's population was packed into downtown, which by this time stretched as far south as Prather Street (later renamed Broadway). Many still-remaining buildings reveal what the area was like at this time, with narrow, two to four-story buildings packing the streets.

The area and the city continued to grow during the railroad era. However, the increased mobility of early trolleys, as well as the sheer number and diversity of people moving to Louisville, saw a shift in focus as areas like Phoenix Hill, Russell and what is now Old Louisville began to be built on the edges of downtown, particularly after the city annexed those areas in 1868. Railroads lead to a diminished role for the river in transportation, further reducing the importance of downtown in favor of areas on what was then the edge of the city, along rail lines.

In 1886, the first skyscraper, the Kenyon Building, was completed on Fifth Street, followed in 1890 by the ten-story Columbia Building. The development of three large suburban parks and the electrified streetcar lead to the first true movement to the suburbs at this time. Some of downtown's business and industry followed people toward these areas. But by the 1920s the commercial center of Louisville was still nearby, at 4th and Broadway, dubbed the "magic corner" by the Herald-Post. The riverfront area of downtown was still being actively improved, such as with the building of what is now George Rogers Clark Memorial Bridge across the Ohio at Second Street in 1929.

After World War II, suburbanization increased and downtown began to decline as interstate highways further reduced the importance of its central location. Since the 1970s, downtown has been the subject of both urban renewal and historic preservation efforts. While many new buildings have been built, it has sometimes been at the expense of older landmarks, such as the Tyler Block.

Many buildings sat totally or mostly vacant at this time, and some became dilapidated to the point where they burned down or had to be razed. Many riverfront industrial sites were abandoned or saw limited use, many were eventually redeveloped into Louisville Waterfront Park. Other issues in the 1970s through the early 1990s included a former theater district on Jefferson Street that had become dubbed the "porno district". The businesses there were seen by the city as an eyesore since they were so close to the convention center, and most were demolished or burned down by the late 1990s. A few adult book stores and bars remained in the general area as of 2007.

From the late 1970s to early 1990s, nine new high rises over 200 feet (61 m) in height were built in downtown. Unlike the city's previous tallest buildings, which were all set along the Broadway corridor, these new buildings were set closer to the riverfront along Main and Market Streets.

Since 2000, downtown has seen another major growth spurt, although this one not only includes new high rises, but also a large scale return of large scale residential and retail back to the city center. The completion of Louisville Slugger Field along with a mass expansion of the city's Waterfront Park, both completed in 1998, sparked new development along the eastern edge of downtown, with entire abandoned blocks rebuilt with new condominium units and shops. Also, new to Louisville is the 22,000-seat KFC Yum! Center at Second and Main Streets which was completed in 2010.

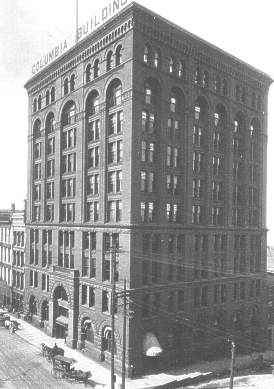
The Columbia Building, Louisville's second skyscraper

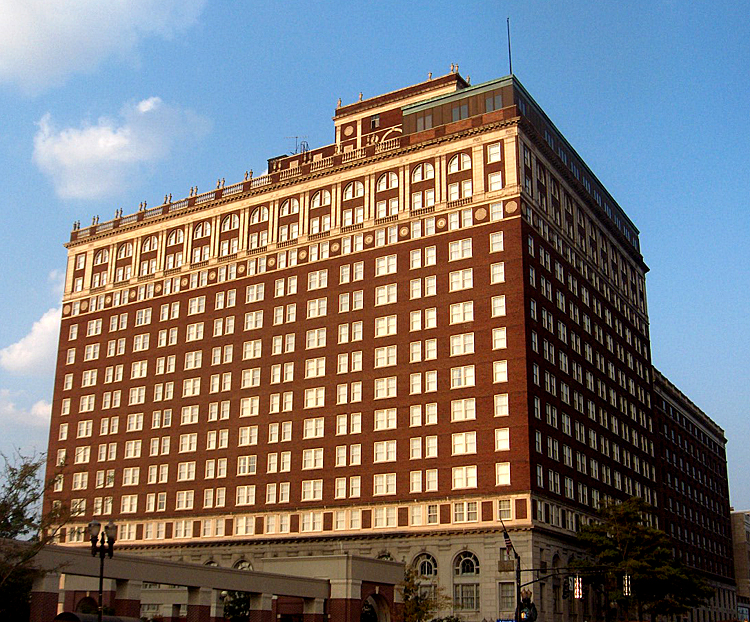
The Brown Hotel (built 1923)

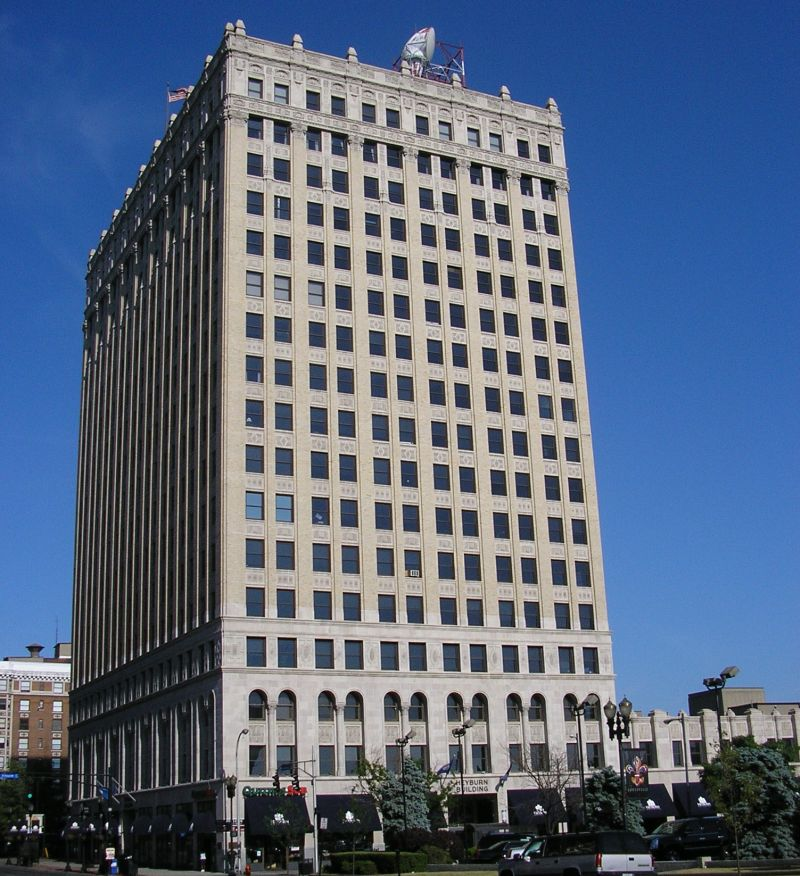
The Heyburn Building (built 1928)

== Residential ==
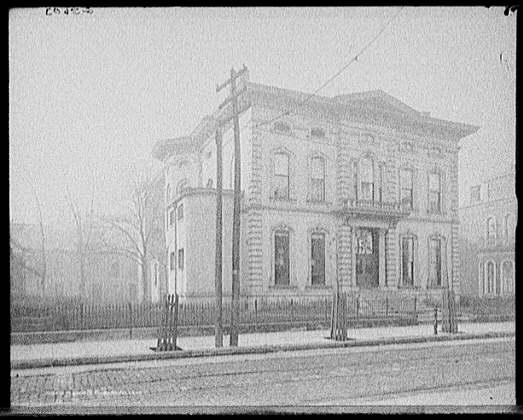
Example of an early downtown mansion, a Walnut Street mansion built by the Belknap family and used as the first clubhouse of the Pendennis Club before being razed

Early residences outside of the forts, still mostly wood structures, were built along the modern street grid on early lots sold to settlers, but have all been demolished over time. What became the almost entirely office and parking-lot dominated downtown still had many solidly single family residential blocks on its fringes up until the early 20th century. Streets near Broadway, such as Chestnut, were lined with large mansions of the owners of businesses on Main and Market streets.

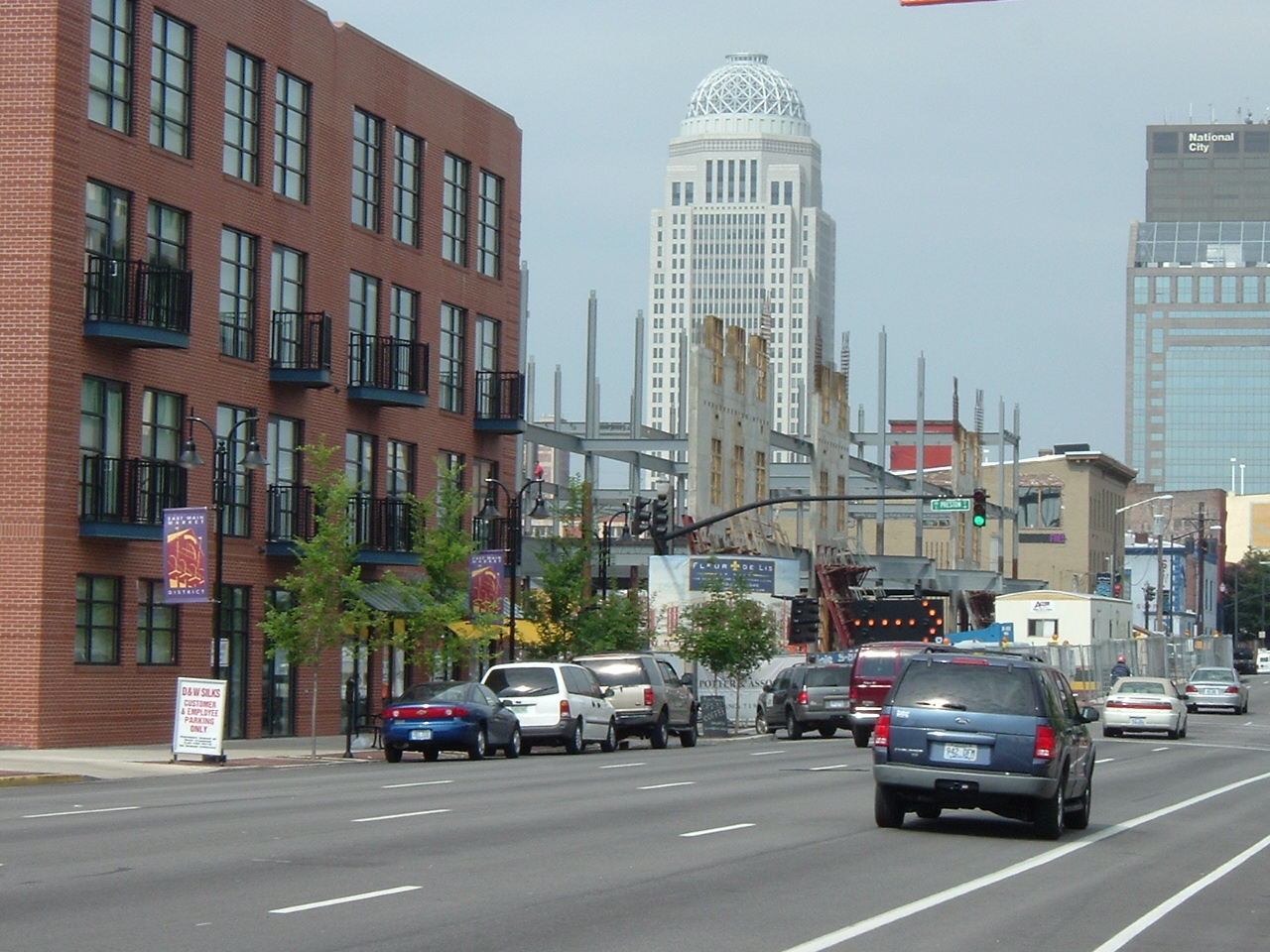
New development on East Main Street

Though these houses were built of brick and other longer-lasting materials, none remained single family homes by the 21st century, although some had been converted for other uses, such as office space. The Brennan House at 631 S. Fifth, which is operated as a historic property with daily tours, shows a glimpse of downtown Louisville's residential past. A structure at 432 South Fifth Street is the only example of a pre-Civil War residence remaining downtown; built in 1829 it has been converted to commercial use.

By the late 20th century, downtown Louisville had acquired a reputation as a place to work and visit during the week but which shuts down evenings and weekends. The first changes to this were the conversion of old warehouse and factory space to loft apartments in the late 1980s. By the late 1990s and early 2000s, new developments of luxury condominiums such as the 22-story Waterfront Park Place, and the $30 million project Fleur de Lis on Main, indicate increasing residential interest in downtown Louisville. On September 9, 2013, Mayor Greg Fischer joined groundbreaking ceremonies for the second phase of RiverPark Place, a marina apartment/condominium development covering 40 acres along River Road, with a walkway west to Waterfront Park. In 1997, the Kentucky Towers was the largest residential building in downtown Louisville, and in 2015, just south of downtown, The 800 Apartments started undergoing a more than $10 million modernization. In 2007 downtown Louisville became Jefferson County's tenth Multiple Listing Service zone.

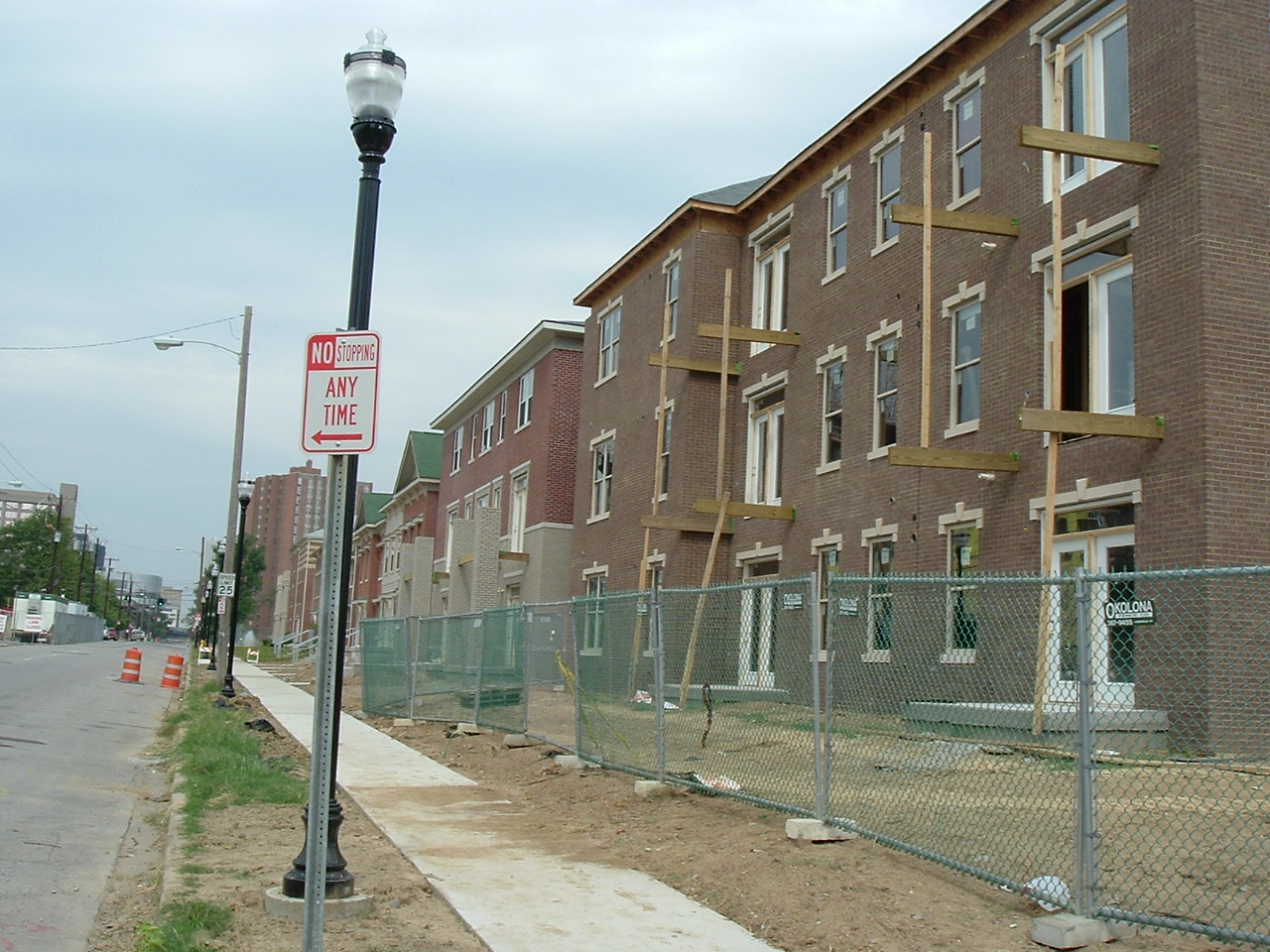
Liberty Greens will contain over 600 mixed-income housing units

Housing units available downtown were expected to double between 2005 and 2010, from 1,800 to nearly 4,000, after increasing by only 900 units from 1985 to 2005. This is both a result of new condominium construction and efforts to convert existing buildings into mixed usage, such as the $20 million redevelopment of the historic eight-story Henry Clay building at Third and Chestnut streets into a mix of residential, restaurant, retail and event space. The redevelopment also includes property that extends east to Fourth Street, which will become a public piazza, and the historic Wright-Taylor building, a two-story, 13,500-square-foot (1,250 m^{2}) structure that faces Fourth Street and is located behind the Henry Clay, and is now an upscale restaurant that occupies the entire Wright-Taylor building.

== Transportation ==
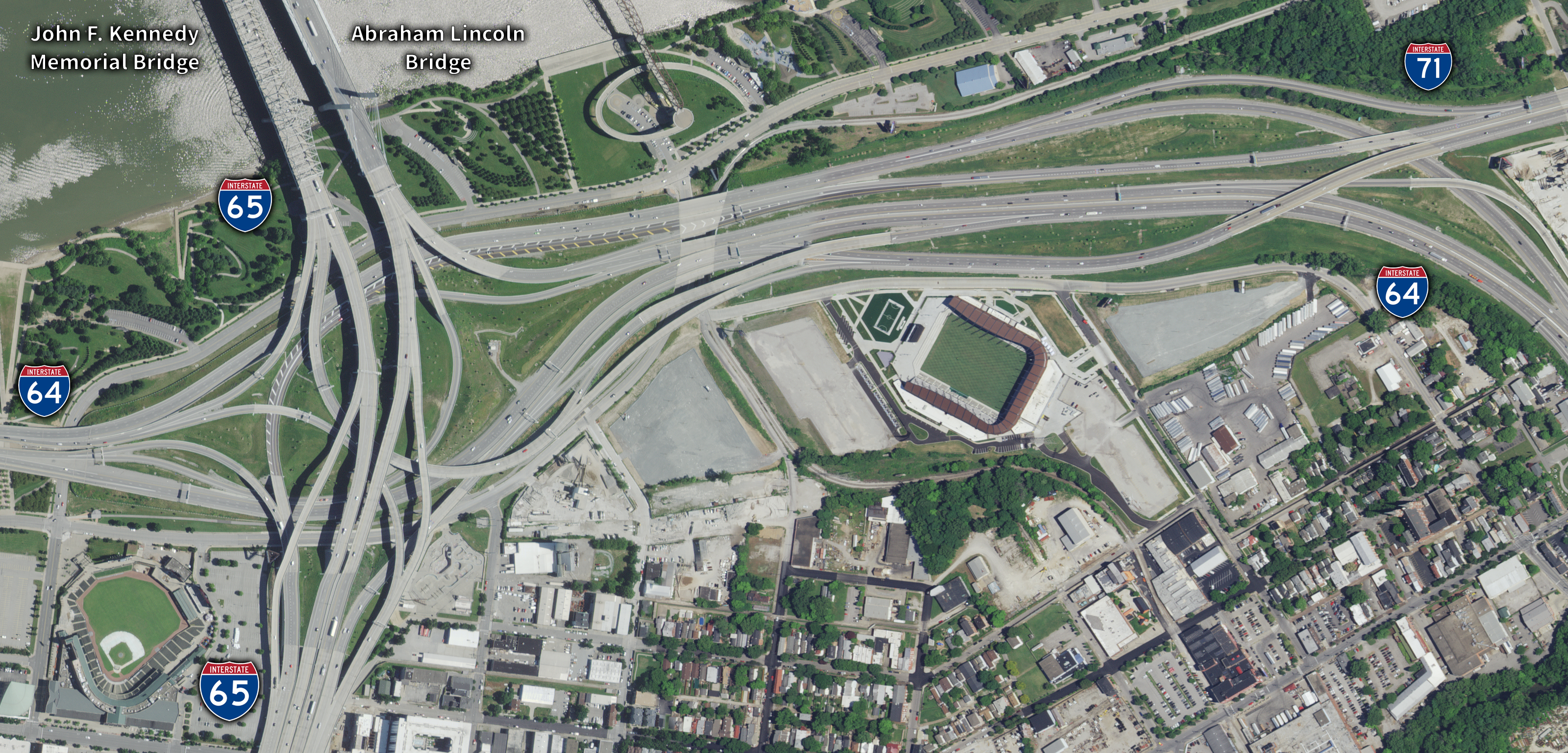
Aerial view of the Kennedy Interchange

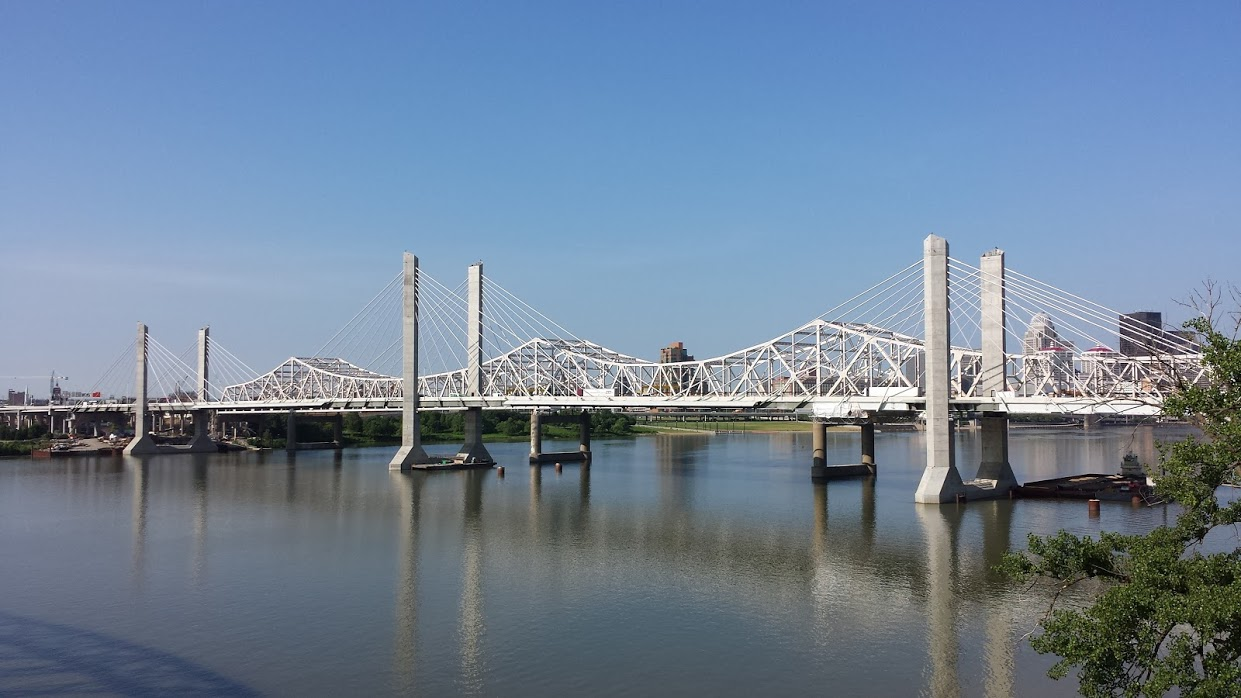
The Abraham Lincoln Bridge and John F. Kennedy Memorial Bridge viewed from the Big Four Bridge

Downtown Louisville has three major interstates: I-65, I-64, and I-71. I-65 is the main north–south interstate and bypasses downtown to the east., while I-64 is the main east–west interstate and bypasses downtown to the north. I-71 splits from I-64 northwest of downtown, and continues northeastward. All three interstates converge at the Kennedy Interchange, commonly referred to as "Spaghetti Junction". I-65 crosses the Ohio River on the Abraham Lincoln Bridge for northbound traffic, and the John F. Kennedy Memorial Bridge for southbound traffic. I-65 comes from Nashville, Tennessee, and heads due north to Indianapolis, Indiana, and eventually leads to Chicago, Illinois. I-64 comes from Lexington, Kentucky, and heads due west towards St. Louis, Missouri, and I-71 heads due northeast to Cincinnati, Ohio. the major U.S. Routes are U.S Route 31 (U.S Route 31W and U.S Route 31E converge in downtown), U.S Route 60, U.S Route 150, and U.S Route 42. Rapid transit is provided by TARC's Dixie Line. The Louisville Muhammad Ali International Airport is located 7 miles south of downtown with service by American, Delta, and United, among others.

== Plans ==
Projects in downtown have included the construction of a wharf along the Riverwalk Trail, and the Ohio River Bridges Project, which involved the reconstruction of the aforementioned Spaghetti Junction along with the addition of a new bridge for northbound I-65 traffic, as well as the conversion of the former Big Four railroad bridge into a pedestrian and bicycle only bridge, which opened on the Kentucky side in 2013 and the Indiana side in 2014.

On August 19, 2007, city leaders and the Cordish Company, developers of 4th Street Live!, announced Center City, a $442 million, multi-year plan to develop 23 acres (93,000 m^{2}), bounded by Second, Third and Liberty streets and Muhammad Ali Boulevard, that will include new housing, restaurants, a cinema and a boutique hotel. An estimated 500,000 square feet (46,000 m^{2}) of floor space being created, including a 15-story structure. As the plan would require $130 million in local and state tax rebates for Cordish, it requires approval from the Louisville Metro Council and Kentucky General Assembly. There is no official start time for the project, as financing is still being secured by the Cordish Company.

Also announced in 2007, the glass and steel $50 million shopping and office complex Iron Quarter was to be constructed within the Whiskey Row Historic District, but the project was delayed and eventually set aside when property owner Todd Blue made an agreement with the city of Louisville in January 2011 to demolish the seven original buildings. In May 2011, after all seven buildings had been landmarked, a new agreement was made with the city to save five of the seven buildings by donating one and selling the other four, with the remaining two to be demolished. Facades of all seven buildings are to be preserved.

== Attractions ==
Many attractions are located in downtown Louisville.

- "Museum Row" in the West Main District
  - Frazier History Museum
  - Kentucky Museum of Art and Craft
  - Kentucky Science Center
  - Louisville Slugger Museum & Factory
  - Muhammad Ali Center
  - National Society of the Sons of the American Revolution Genealogical Research Library
- East Market District, featuring a row of art galleries, prominently featured in the monthly First Friday Trolley Hop
- Belle of Louisville
- Early Times Distillery
- Fort Nelson Park
- Fourth Street Live!
- The Kentucky Center
- Louisville Extreme Park
- Louisville Slugger Field (home of the Louisville Bats and Louisville City FC, though Louisville City will move out of the stadium once it opens its own new stadium in Butchertown in 2020)
- Waterfront Park
- Riverfront Plaza/Belvedere
- KFC Yum! Center (home of Louisville Cardinals men's and women's basketball, as well as a secondary venue for women's volleyball)
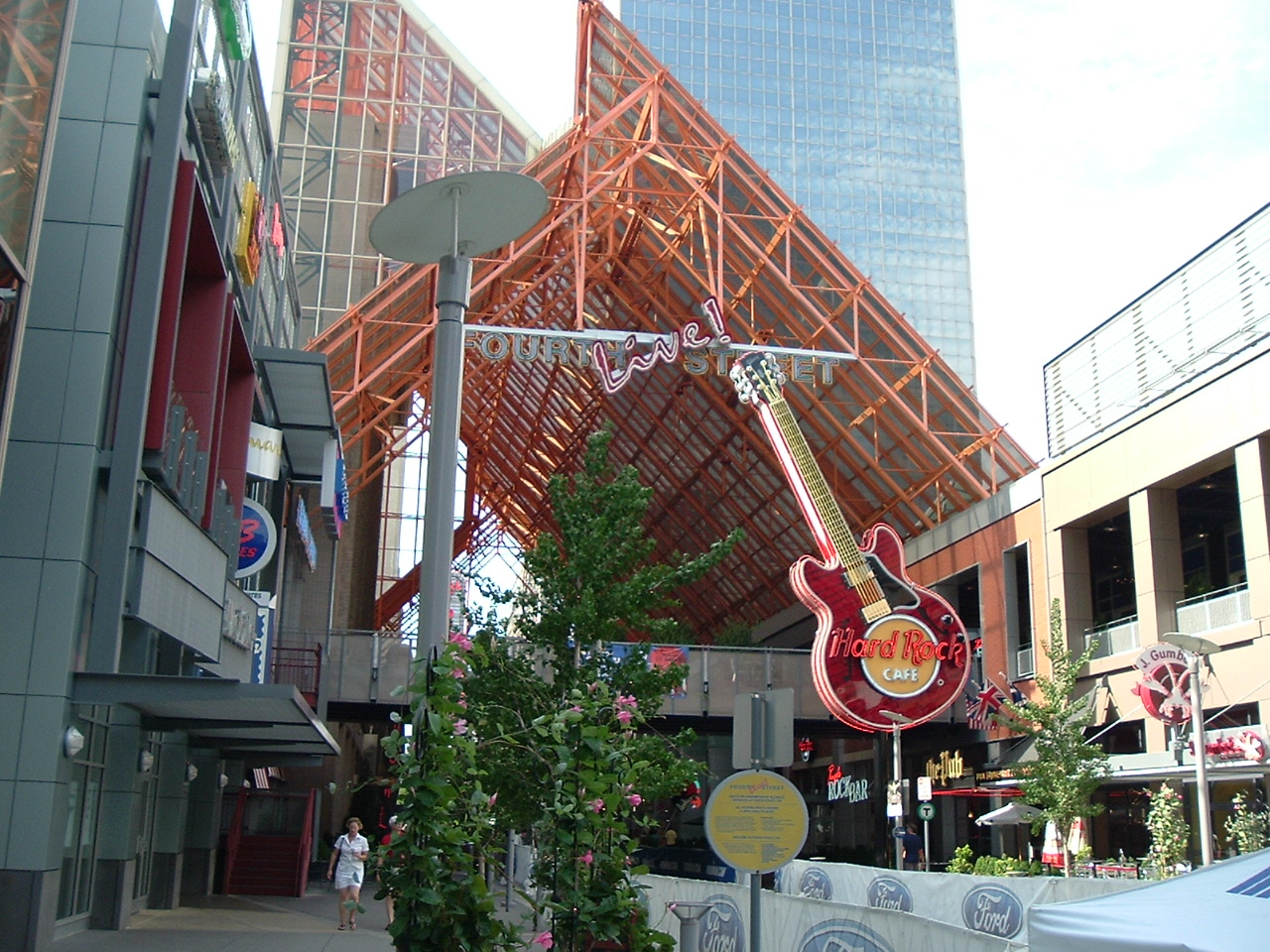
Fourth Street Live!

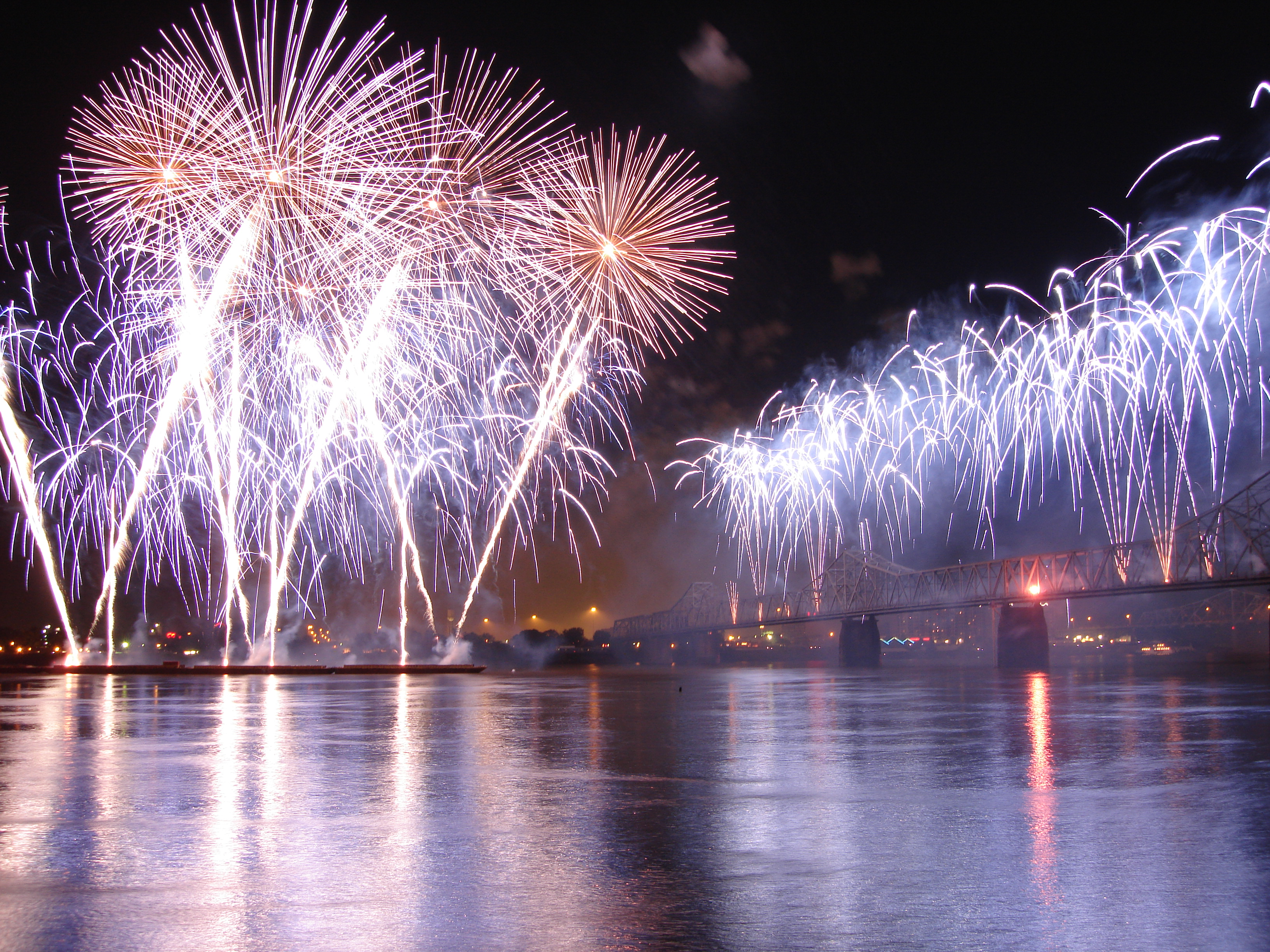
Thunder Over Louisville

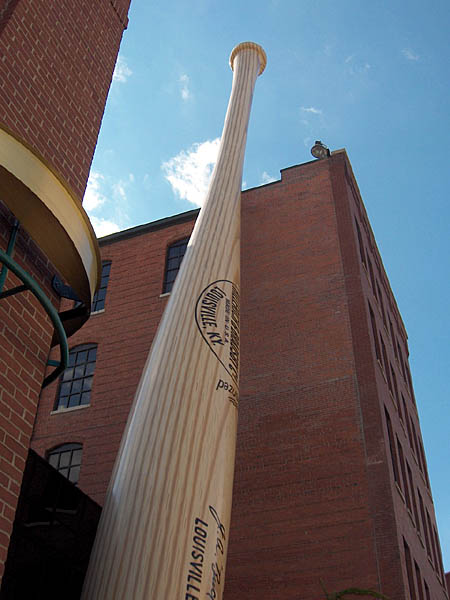
Louisville Slugger Museum & Factory

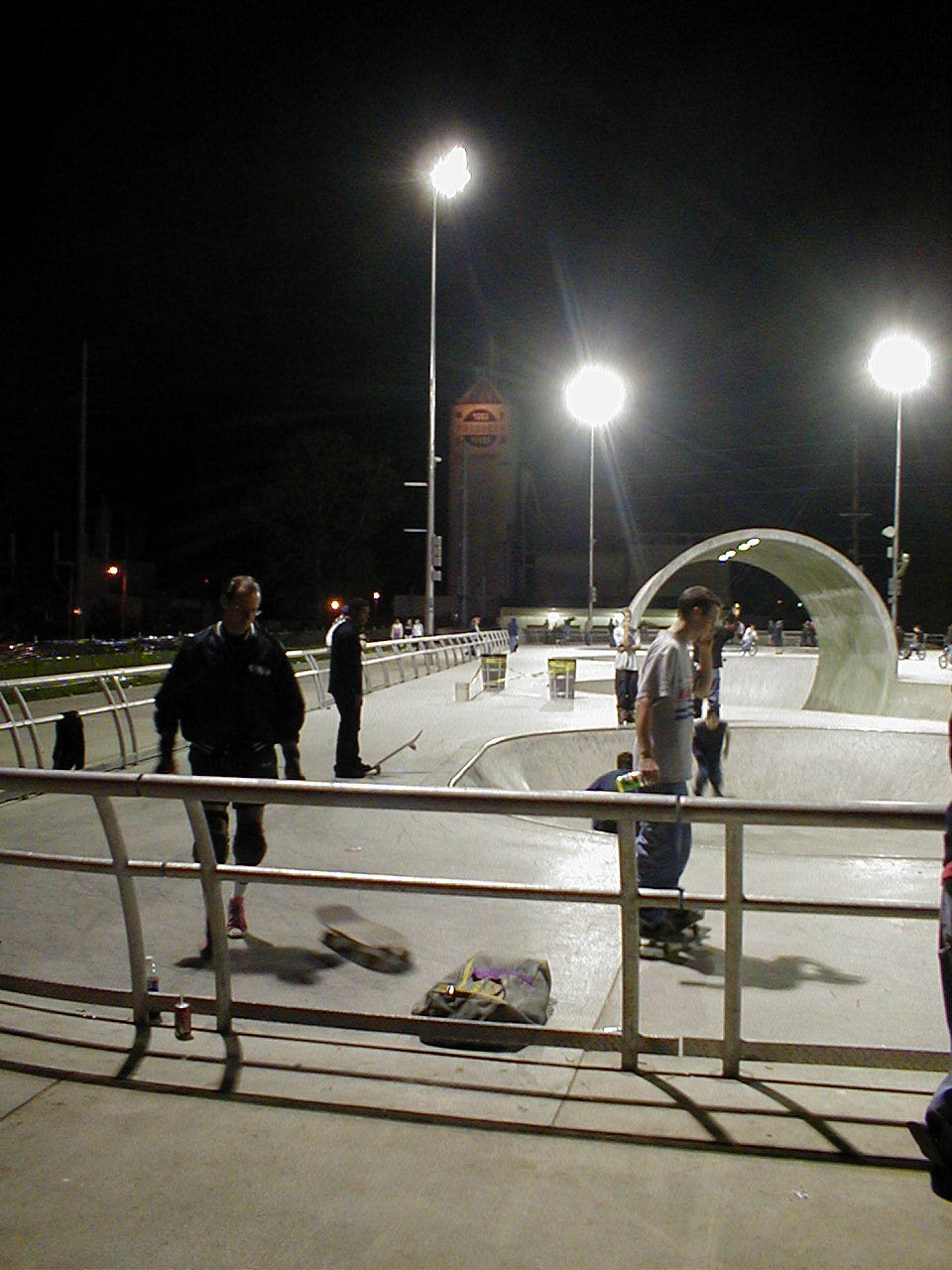
Louisville Extreme Park

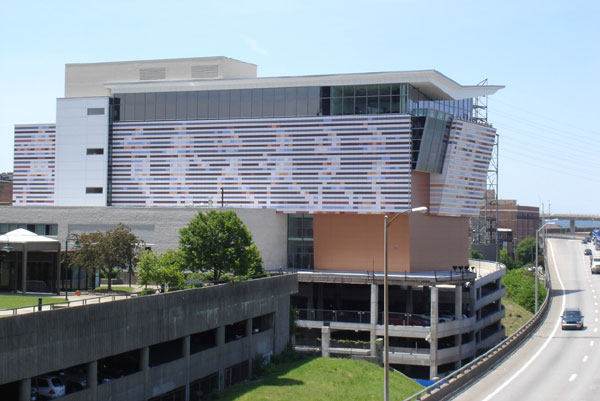
Muhammad Ali Center

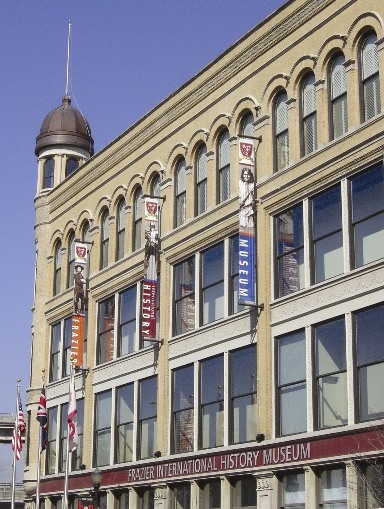
Frazier History Museum

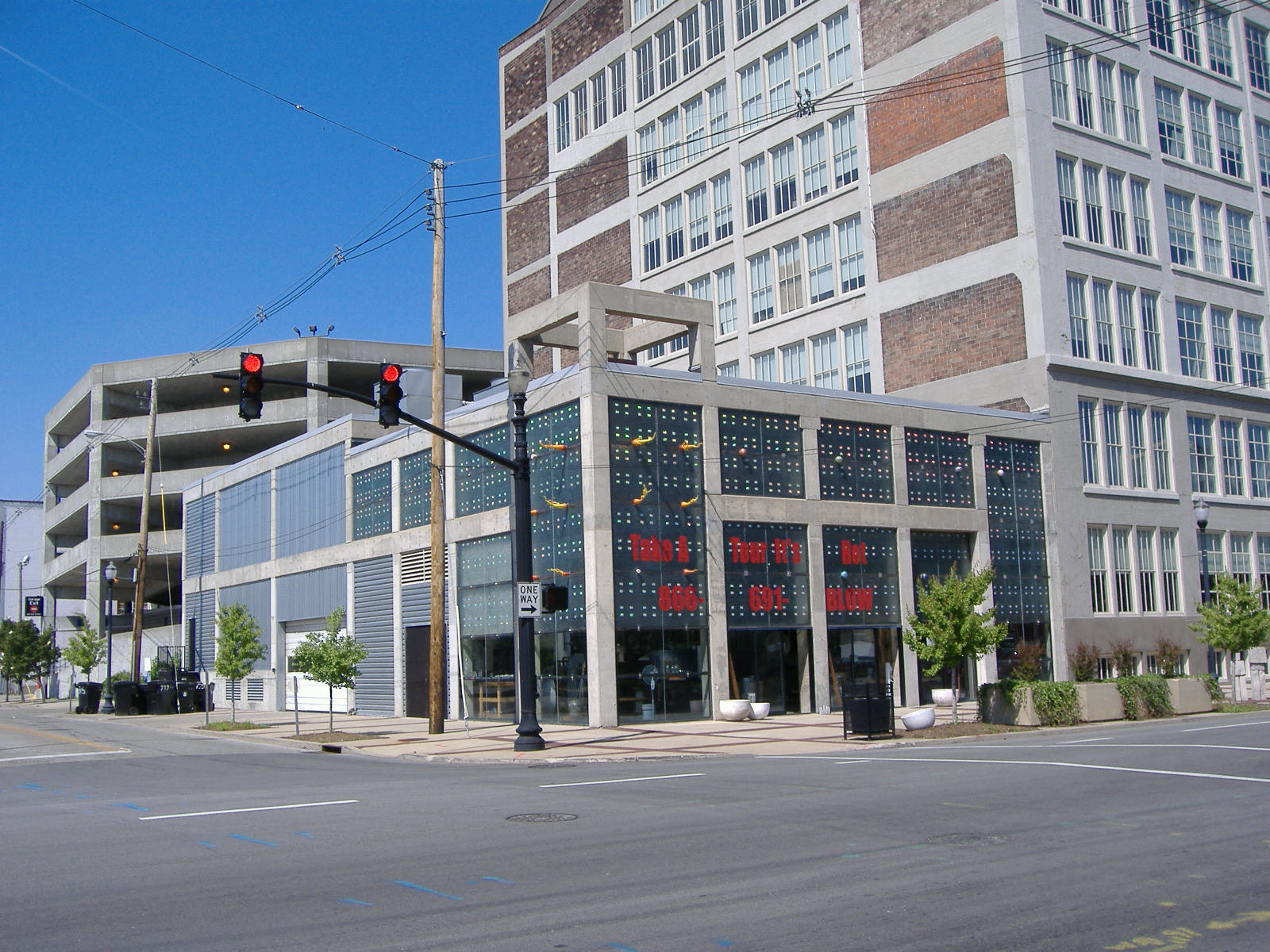
Louisville Glassworks Museum and Artists Studio

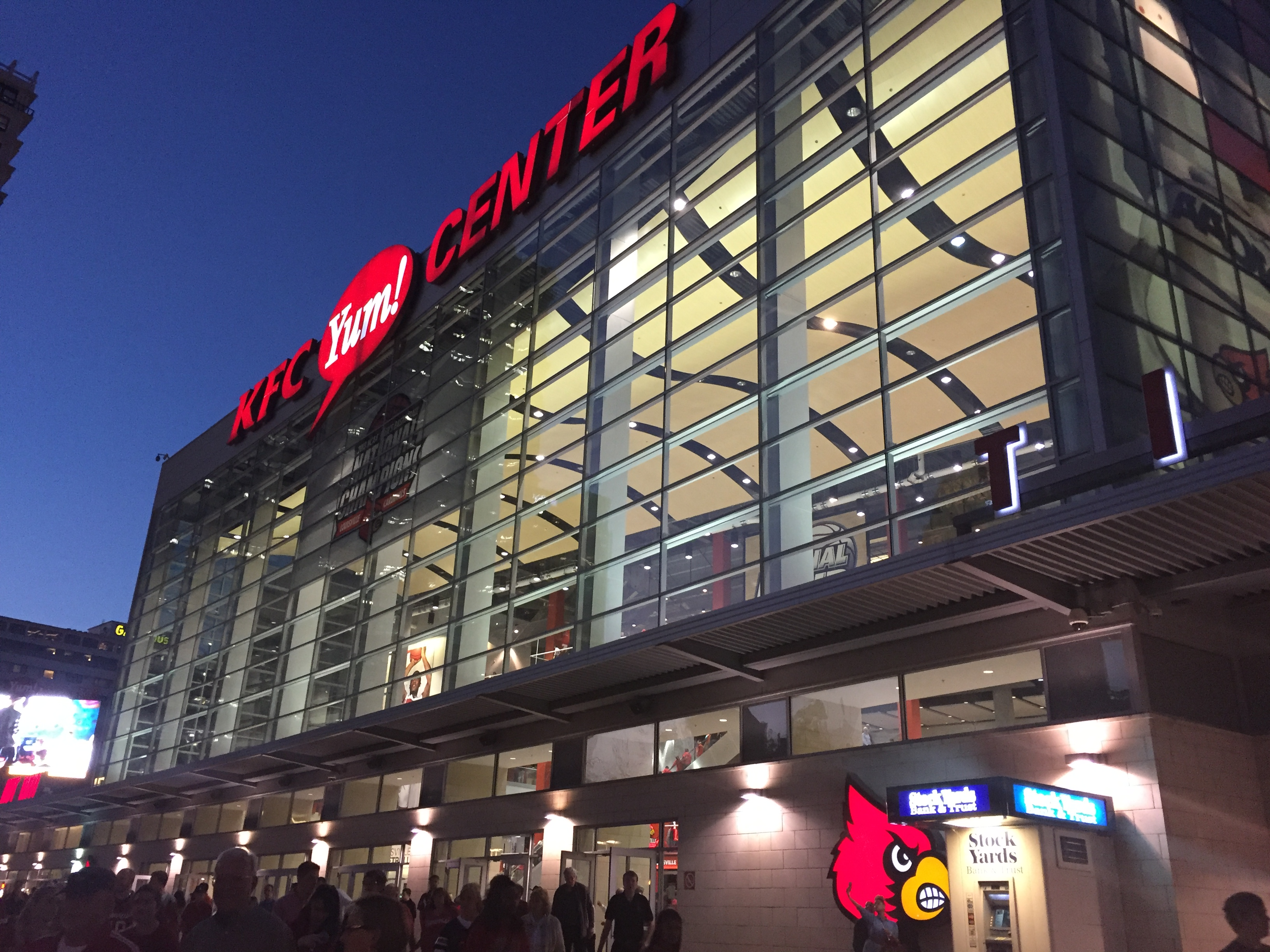
KFC Yum! Center

== Images ==
=== Modern high rises ===
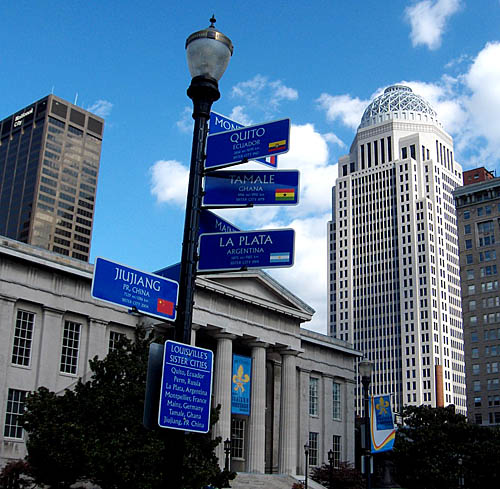
The distances to each of Louisville's sister cities are represented on this lightpost downtown.

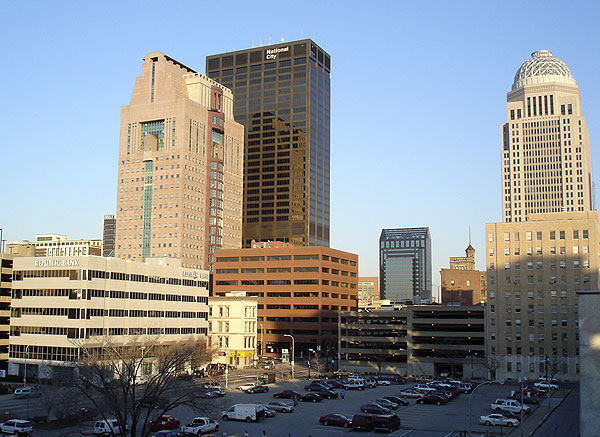
Many of Louisville's skyscrapers, from left: The Humana Building, PNC Tower, LG&E Center (distant) and 400 West Market

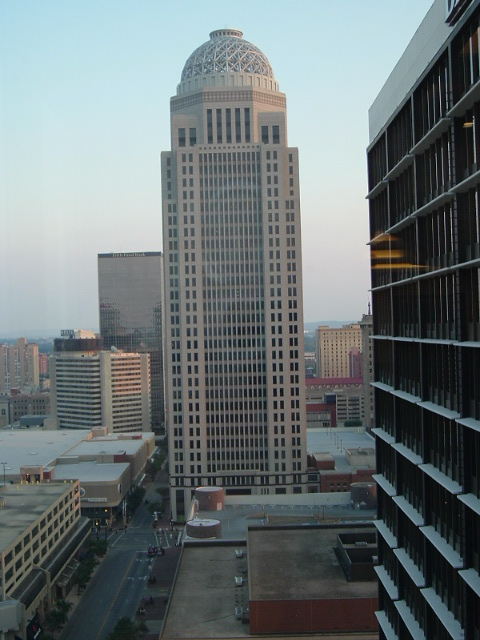
400 West Market, Kentucky's tallest building since 1993

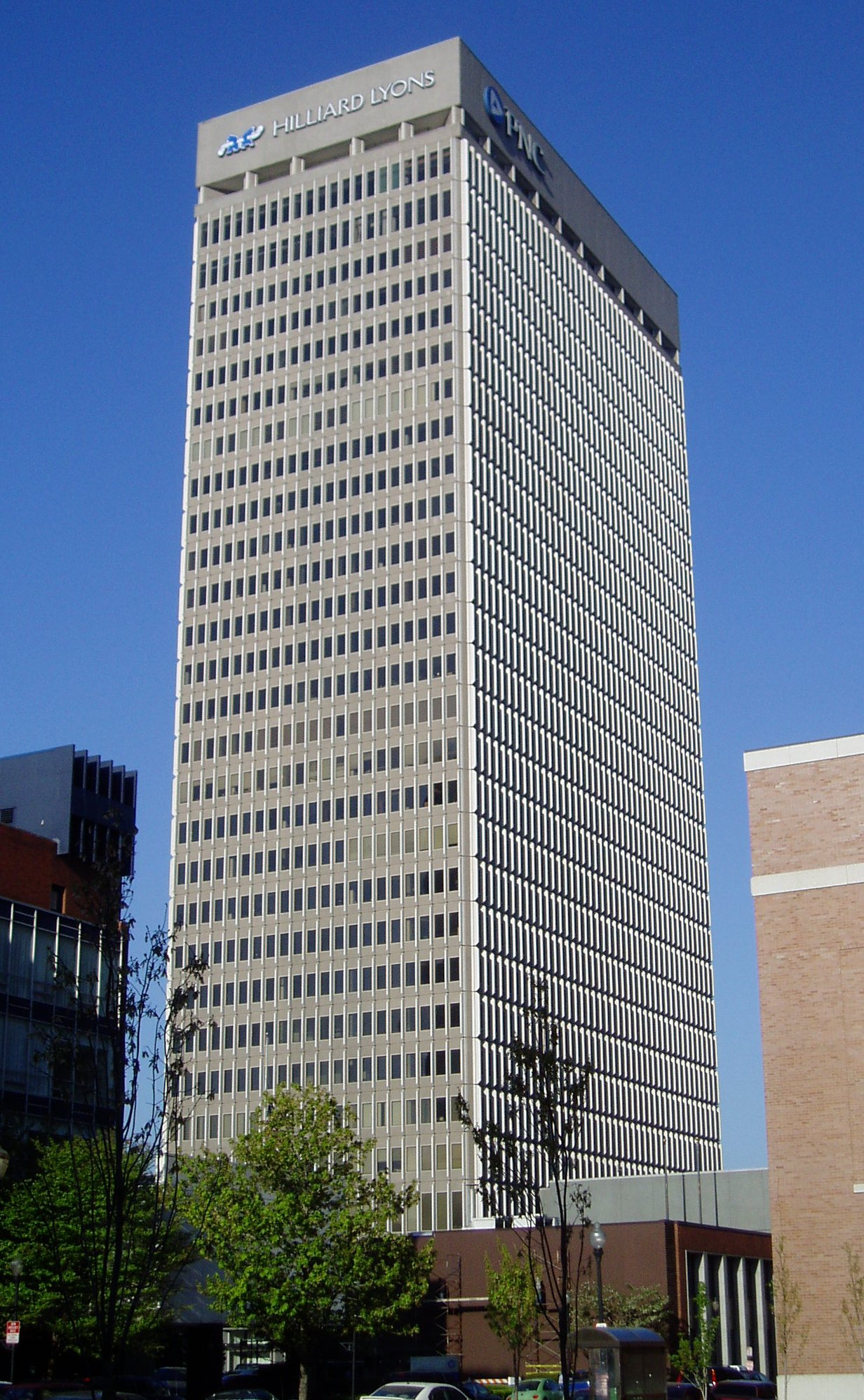
PNC Tower

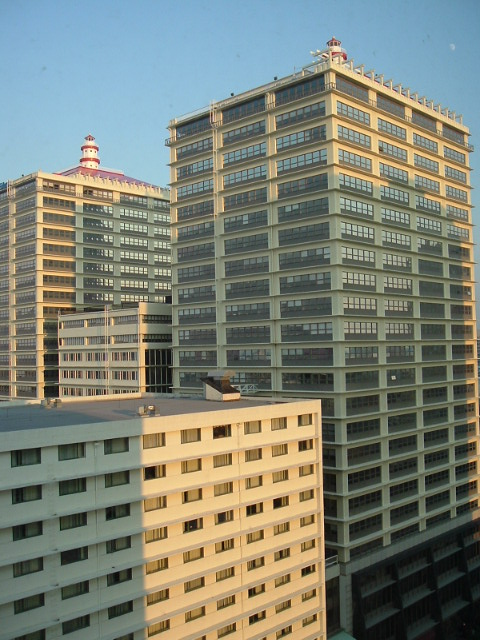
Waterfront Plaza I & II

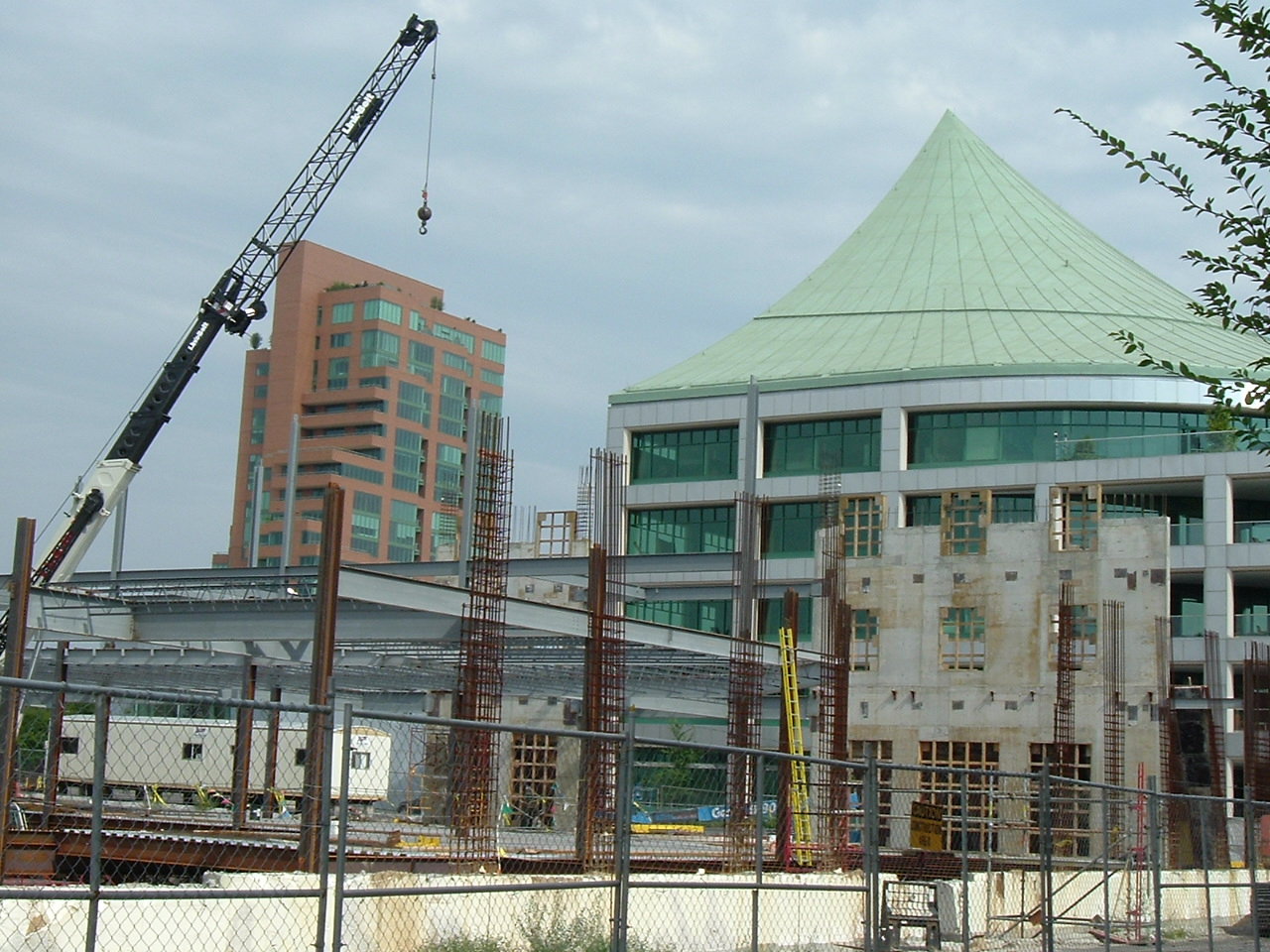
Top Left: Waterfront Park Place (2004), Right: Preston Pointe (2004)

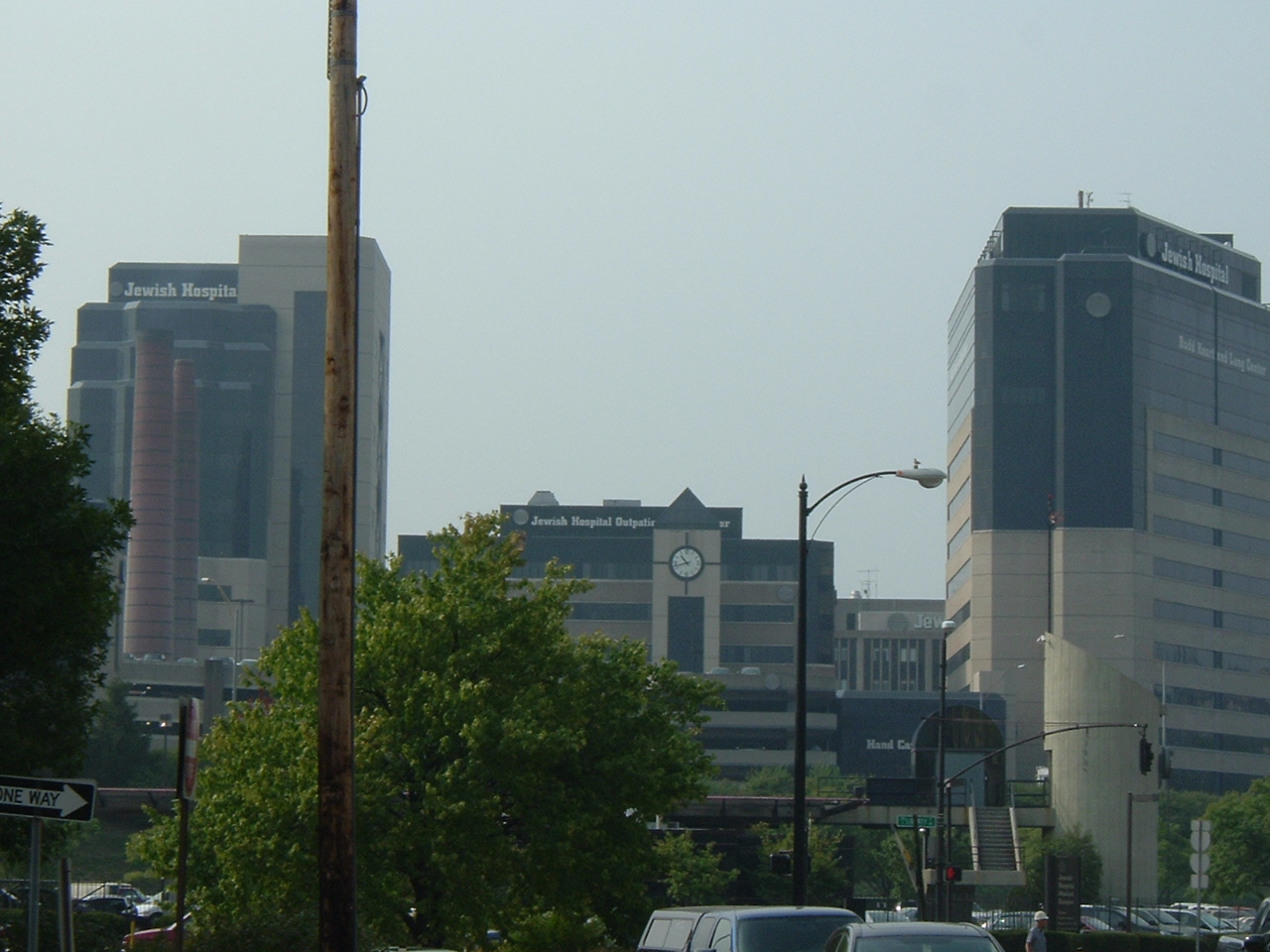
Jewish Hospital Medical Towers

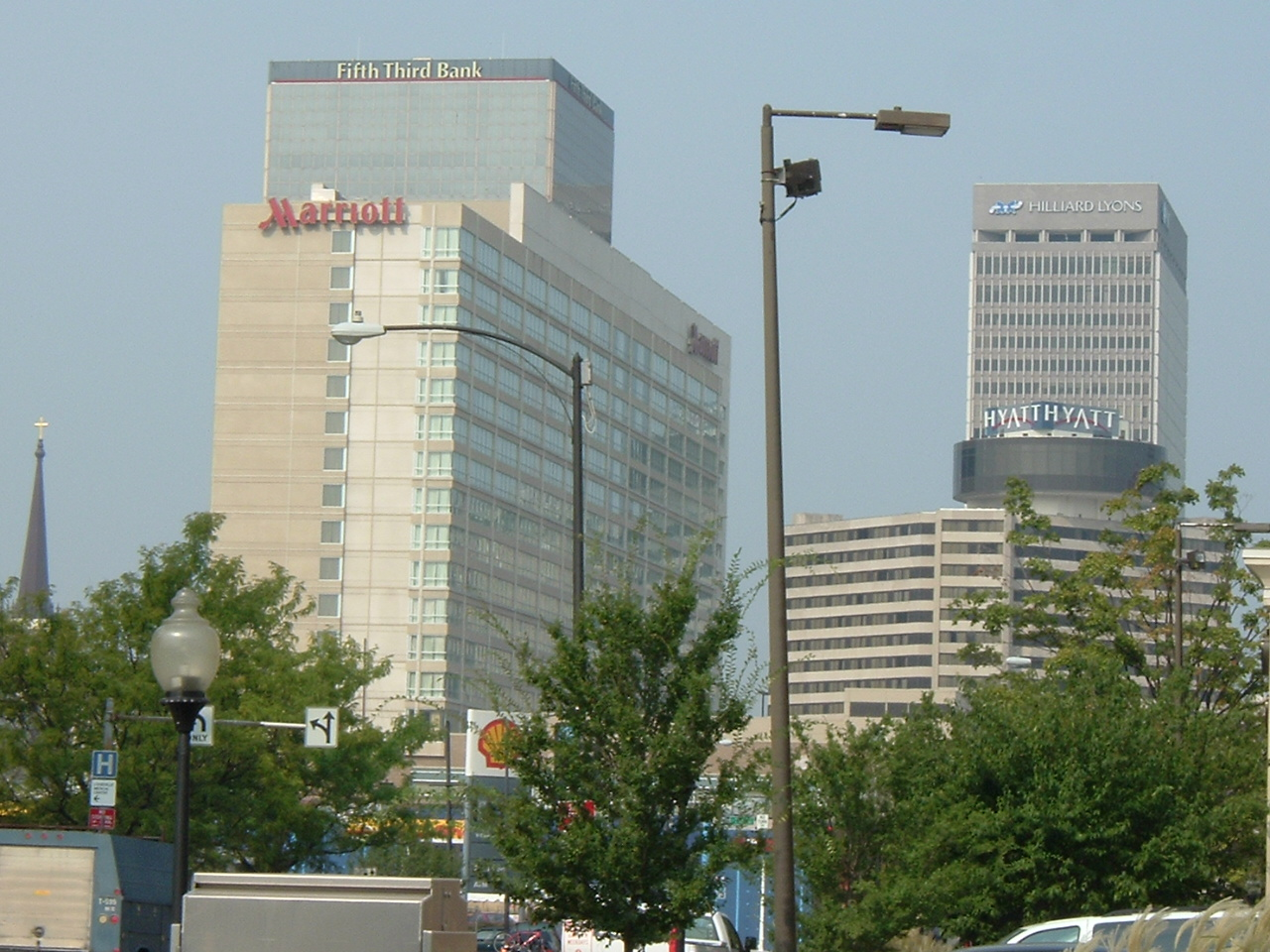
The Marriott and Hyatt Regency Hotels in downtown

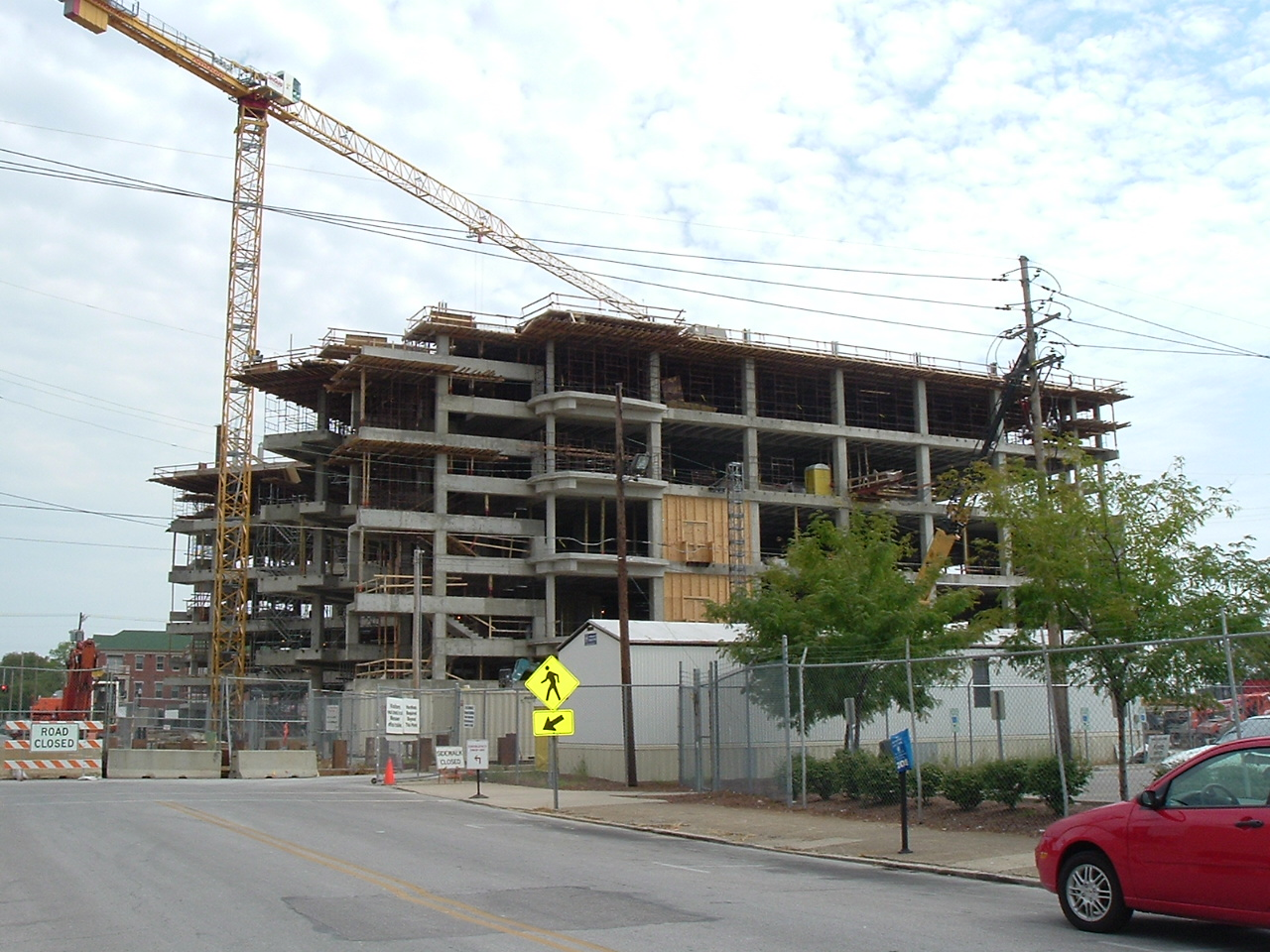
Construction on medical research building at Hancock and Liberty Streets

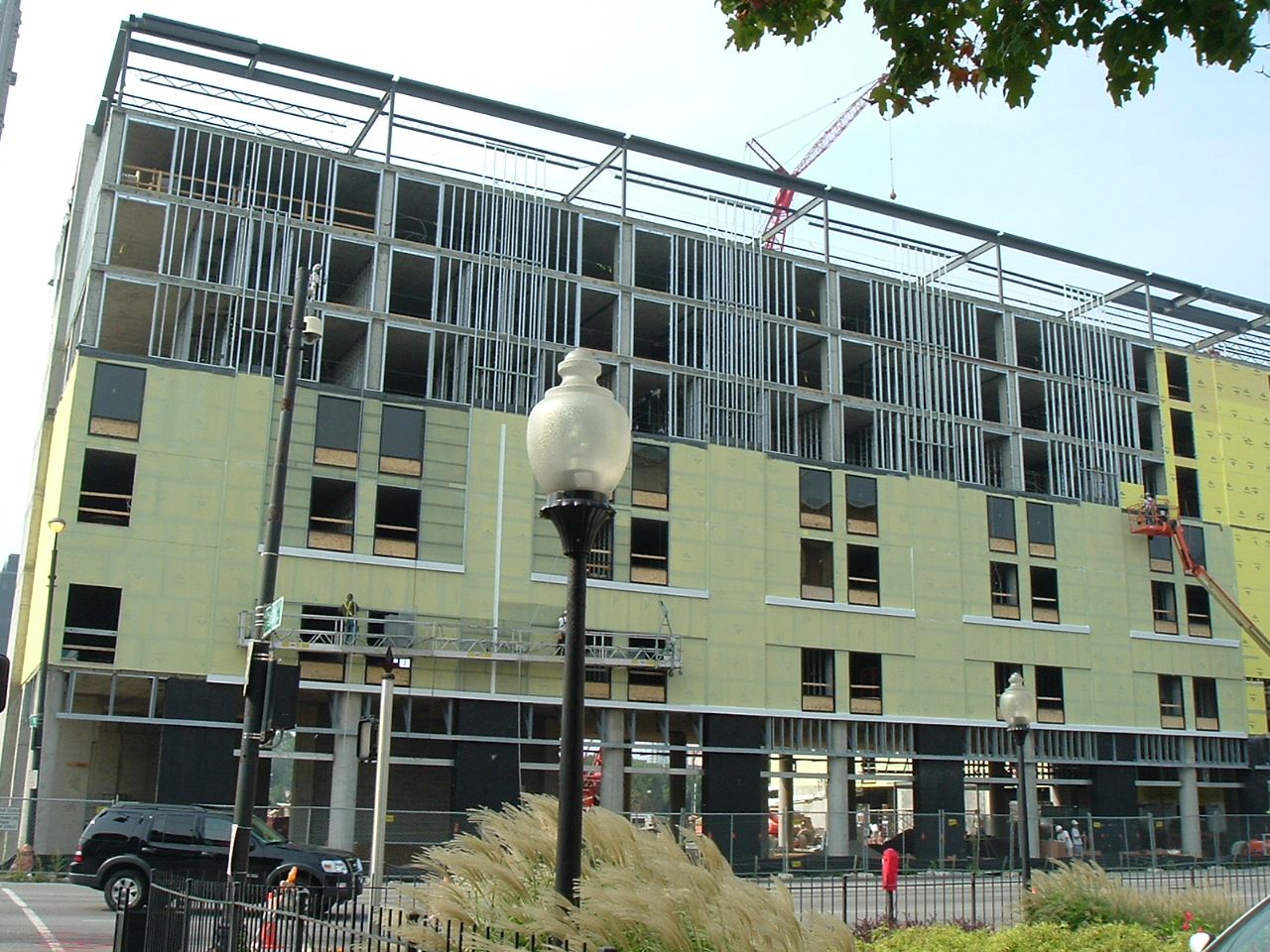
Construction on new hotel complex, Preston and Liberty Streets

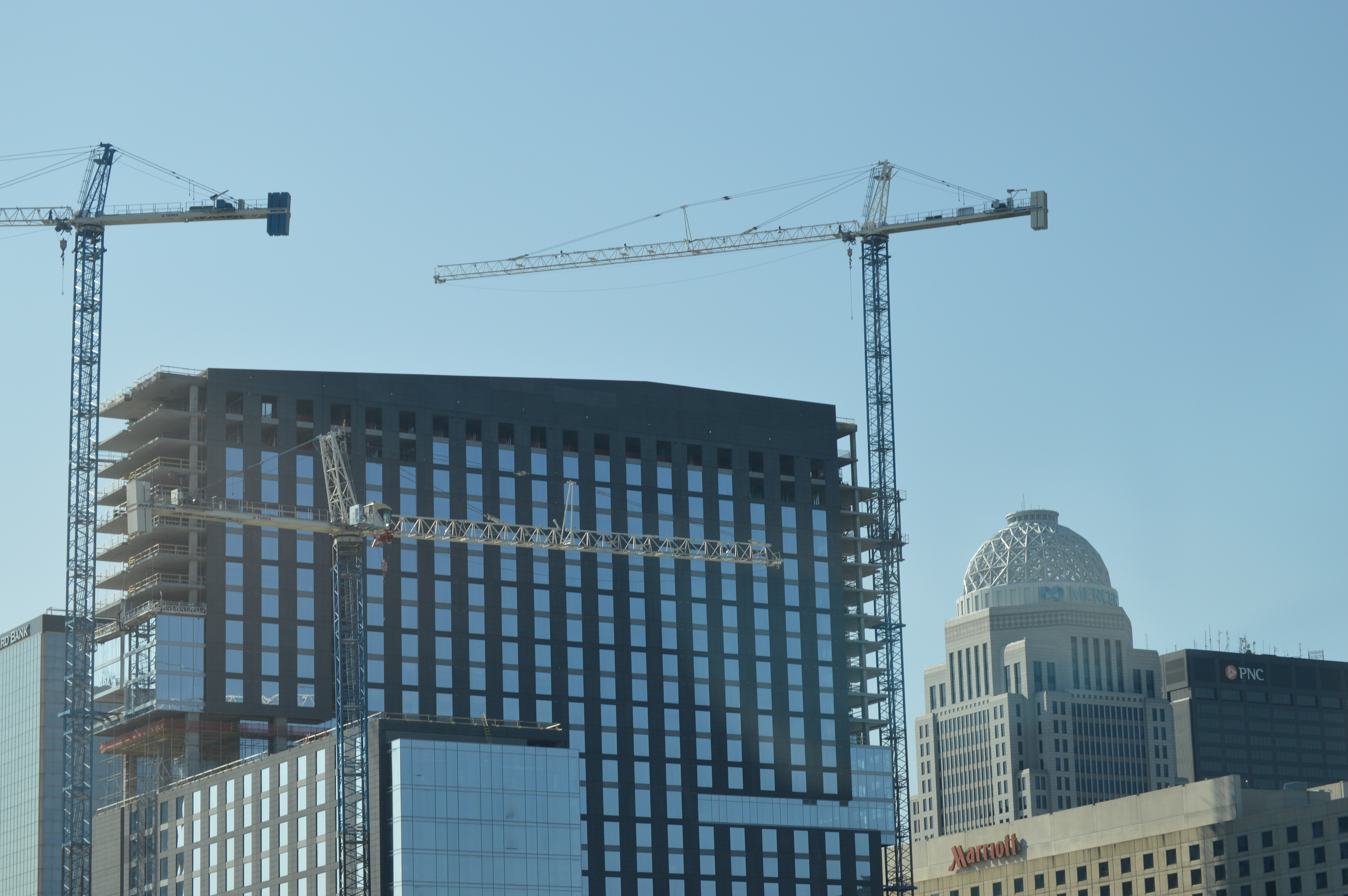
The Omni Louisville Hotel under construction in August 2017, completed March 2018

== Tallest buildings in downtown Louisville ==
Rank	Building	Height	Floors	Year completed/projected	Status
1	400 West Market (Capital Holding Center, Providian Center, AEGON Center)	549 ft (167 m)	35	1993	Completed
2	PNC Tower (National City Tower)	512 ft (156 m)	40	1972	Completed
3	PNC Plaza (Citizens Fidelity Plaza)	420 ft (128 m)	31	1971	Completed
4 (tie)	Humana Building	417 ft (127 m)	27	1984	Completed
–	Omni Louisville Hotel	417 ft (127 m)	30	2018	Completed
6	Waterfront Park Place	364 ft (111 m)	23	2004	Completed
7 (tie)	Meidinger Tower (South Tower)	363 ft (110.6 m)	26	1982	Completed
–	Brown & Williamson Tower (North Tower, Oxford Tower)	363 ft (110.6 m)	26	1982	Completed
9 (tie)	Waterfront Plaza I	340 ft (103.6 m)	25	1991	Completed
–	Waterfront Plaza II	340 ft (103.6 m)	25	1993	Completed
11	LG&E Center (One Corporate Plaza, LG&E Building)	328 ft (100 m)	23	1989	Completed
12	Galt House (West Tower)	325 ft (99 m)	25	1972	Completed
13	Galt House (East Tower)	322 ft (98 m)	20	1985	Completed
14	BB&T Building (Louisville Trust Building, United Kentucky Building, Liberty Bank Building)	312 ft (95 m)	24	1972	Completed
15 (tie)	Avenue Plaza Apartments; Metro Housing Authority	250 ft (76.2 m)	18	1974	Completed
–	Heyburn Building	250 ft (76.2 m)	17	1928	Completed
17 (tie)	J O Blanton House; U.S. Housing and Urban Development	246 ft (74.98 m)	20	1972	Completed
–	Hyatt Regency	246 ft (74.98 m)	18	1978	Completed
–	Dosker Manor East and West; Metro Housing Authority	246 ft (74.98 m)	18	1968	Completed
20	Kentucky Home Life Building	235 ft (71.6 m)	19	1913	Completed
21 (tie)	Kentucky Towers	202 ft (61.5 m)	18	1924	Completed
–	Starks Building	202 ft (61.5 m)	14	1913	Completed
23	River View Place	201 ft (61 m)	19	1925	
24	Marriott Louisville	200 ft (61 m)	17	2005	Completed
25	Brown Hotel	164 ft (49.99 m)	16	1923	Completed
26	ZirMed Gateway Towers	157.11 ft (47.89 m)	12	2009	Completed

== See also ==
- Cityscape of Louisville, Kentucky
- Geography of Louisville, Kentucky
- Ohio River Bridges Project
- National Register of Historic Places listings in Downtown Louisville, Kentucky
