= 2023 Louisville bank shooting =

Mass shooting in Kentucky, U.S.

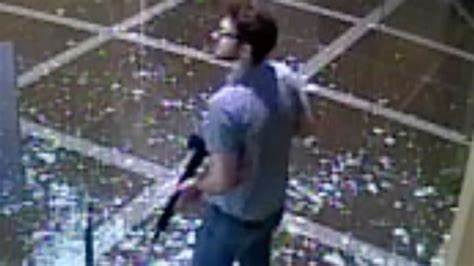
- Connor Sturgeon inside of the bank during the shooting
- Location: 38°15′20.51″N 85°44′46.42″W; Old National Bank, Louisville, Kentucky, U.S.
- Date: April 10, 2023; 3 years ago 8:35 – 8:43 a.m. (EDT; UTC−04:00)
- Attack type: Mass shooting; mass murder; workplace shooting; shootout
- Weapon: Radical Firearms RF-15 (AR-15–style rifle)
- Deaths: 6 (including the perpetrator)
- Injuries: 8
- Perpetrator: Connor James Sturgeon
- Motive: Desire to highlight lax gun laws in the United States

On April 10, 2023, a mass shooting occurred at an Old National Bank branch in Louisville, Kentucky, United States. Five people were killed, and eight others were injured, including two responding police officers. The shooter, 25-year-old former employee Connor James Sturgeon, was fatally shot by police at the scene. It was determined that Sturgeon was motivated by a desire to highlight lax gun laws in the United States.

== Shooting ==
External videos
- Footage of LMPD response to shooter
- https://www.youtube.com/watch?v=JoAtXY24Wpw

The shooting happened in the Old National Bank on the first floor of the Preston Pointe building on East Main Street, near Louisville Slugger Field and Waterfront Park. The shooter used an AR-15 style rifle, according to an anonymous federal law enforcement source.

At 8:15 a.m. EDT, Sturgeon arrived at the Old National Bank in his car and took out a gym bag from the trunk. He walked to his office to prepare for the shooting. Around 17 minutes later, while sitting in his office, Sturgeon started an Instagram livestream from his cellphone. He would make last minute adjustments before finally stepping out of his office about three minutes later.

At 8:35:12 a.m., Sturgeon came out of his office, carrying the rifle, three loaded magazines, and a cellphone placed in his shirt pocket. He briefly walked into a nearby office to check for people before walking out. As he walked out, he encountered a female co-worker. He aimed the rifle at her and said, "it's time to go" before pulling the trigger. However, no round was fired. He pulled the charging handle of the rifle and tried shooting a round at her again. This time, he managed to hit her leg with a single shot. The co-worker ran away as Sturgeon turned his attention towards the conference room while releasing a live round. The first shot happened at 8:35:35 a.m.

In the conference room, 13 people were attending a meeting physically while some were attending through a video call. A male co-worker, who was aware of the gunshot, ran out of the conference room to the hallway just as Sturgeon walked towards the room. Sturgeon shot the man to death before walking up to the entrance of the conference room. Sturgeon proceeded to open fire at the occupants of the conference room while blocking the entrance. He fired in different angles to reach people hiding underneath the table. He shot eight people inside the conference room, killing four, before turning away and reloading his rifle. The entire assault on the conference room, beginning from the moment the male co-worker was shot to death outside, lasted 23 seconds. 25-30 rounds were fired at the conference room.

For the next four minutes, Sturgeon would pace and hide around the first floor of the building waiting for police to arrive, even checking his watch. No shots were fired during the interval.

At 8:40:53 a.m., Sturgeon opened fire on a police vehicle that had arrived at the shooting scene. He also quickly fired a shot at two civilians in the office lobby, hitting no one, before pacing between the lobby and the office area. At 8:41:35 a.m., two police officers, Nickolas Wilt and Cory Galloway, tried approaching the building on foot. Sturgeon fired several rounds at the officers, hitting both of them and a civilian who was across the street from the bank. About 30 seconds later, Sturgeon fired two more rounds at Wilt and other officers trying to rescue him. For the next two minutes, Sturgeon paced around the building without firing any more shots. At 8:43:46 a.m., police engaged in a shootout with Sturgeon. Officer Galloway fired several rounds at Sturgeon with his duty rifle, killing him and ending the incident.

Phone calls placed at around 8:38 a.m. EDT from the Old National Bank reported an active shooter in the area. The call was later changed to an active aggressor report. The employees of Old National Bank were in a conference room during a scheduled virtual meeting when the shooter opened fire. A manager at the bank said she observed the shooting through her computer. Before the first shots were fired, the shooter began livestreaming the shooting on Instagram until he was killed by officers from the Louisville Metro Police Department (LMPD). The livestream was then taken down by Instagram.

An eyewitness in the conference room recounted that those in the room heard a click before the shooter opened fire. Another had just walked past the conference room and thought the shooting was construction noise, before being alerted of the shooting by another employee. Officers arrived at the bank three minutes after the first call. A woman who was at the intersection at the start of the shooting recounted that she saw a man lying near the entrance to a hotel before hearing shots and speeding off to a safer location. The shooter had set himself up in an ambush position to target police officers. Around 8:45 a.m., the LMPD confirmed that officers had exchanged gunfire with the shooter, who died of five police-inflicted bullet wounds approximately five minutes after the police arrived.

== Victims ==
Five people were killed in the shooting. All of the victims were employed at Old National Bank. They were: Josh Barrick, 40; Deana Eckert, 57 (who died in the hospital the same day); Tommy Elliott, 63; Juliana Farmer, 45; and Jim Tutt, 64. Elliott was a personal friend and mentor of Kentucky Governor Andy Beshear.

The chief medical officer at University of Louisville Hospital said they had received nine patients, (Note: This figure includes the victim who died at the hospital.) including two police officers, who were injured in the shooting. Three of them had been released later that afternoon, three were still in the hospital with non-life-threatening injuries, and three who were critically wounded had required operations. One police officer required brain surgery.

== Perpetrator ==
The LMPD identified the perpetrator as 25-year-old Connor James Sturgeon (February 11, 1998 – April 10, 2023), who was raised in Greenville, Indiana. Sturgeon attended Floyd Central High School in Floyds Knobs as a teenager. A former student told The Daily Beast that Sturgeon was a star athlete, and seen as a smart and popular student at Floyd Central. Another student claimed that Sturgeon was kept home for most of the eighth grade after repeatedly suffering concussions playing football. A spokesperson for Sturgeon's family confirmed that Sturgeon suffered several concussions. After graduating from Floyd Central in the spring of 2016, Sturgeon moved to Tuscaloosa, Alabama, where he attended the University of Alabama and graduated in December 2020, before moving to Louisville where he was employed by the Old National Bank beginning in June 2021. According to a LinkedIn page, he interned at the bank over previous summers, and had worked full-time at the bank for nearly two years. A bank manager recalled him as being "low key" and "relaxed", and family members noted that he had depression. Several of his friends and members of his family expressed surprise over him being the perpetrator.

Prior to the shooting, Sturgeon messaged one of his friends stating that he felt suicidal and added that he wanted to kill as many people in the bank as he could, according to a police dispatcher. Sturgeon's Instagram account featured mostly pictures of his family and friends, and some dark memes. One had the caption, "I could burn this whole place down," another featured a gif of a scene from Star Wars: The Force Awakens where character Kylo Ren says "I know what I have to do, but I don't know if I have the strength to do it", and the last post before the attack said, "They won't listen to words or protests. Let's see if they hear this."

Sturgeon legally purchased the AR-15 rifle from a Louisville dealer six days before the shooting. Law enforcement sources said that Sturgeon left notes, one at his home and one on him, saying that part of his plan was to show how easily a person with mental illness could legally acquire a firearm in the United States. Sturgeon noted targeting "upper class white people" for its potential impactfulness on the issue was a motive for his actions.

== Investigation ==
The Federal Bureau of Investigation and the Bureau of Alcohol, Tobacco, Firearms and Explosives are assisting with the investigation of the incident.

The LMPD blocked streets and conducted a joint search of Sturgeon's home in the Camp Taylor neighborhood near Interstate 264, located 7.4 miles (11.9 km) south of the bank.

The LMPD report documented the shooter's motive as:

Connor Sturgeon writes his "goals" to "tell my story" and "impact change - gun access." Connor Sturgeon then proceeds to list his "story" involving having good family and friends and doing everything right in his professional and social life. Connor goes on to say he was able to buy a gun and highlighting again "politicians with no interest in making things better" and "stop letting anyone buy guns or this will keep happening."

== Aftermath ==
The Old National Bank building closed in the aftermath of the shooting, and reopened in June 2023 at a new location in Louisville.

Sturgeon's brain was retained and was tested for chronic traumatic encephalopathy, a degenerative brain condition caused by repeated trauma to the head. In November, the results were released and found no evidence of CTE.

== Reactions ==
Governor of Kentucky Andy Beshear said one of the victims, Tommy Elliott, was among his closest friends. Elliott was the senior vice president of Old National Bank. Beshear tweeted that he was heading to the city in response to the shooting. Senate Minority Leader Mitch McConnell (R-KY) issued a statement that he and his wife, Elaine Chao, were devastated. A similar statement was made by Louisville mayor Craig Greenberg, who stated that the community would come together to heal and help prevent similar acts of gun violence. Representative Morgan McGarvey, whose district includes Louisville, thanked first responders, and noted that the shooting took place only weeks after the Nashville school shooting.

President Joe Biden offered his condolences to the victims of the shooting and pushed for gun reform from Senate Republicans. He had made similar comments shortly after the Nashville school shooting, saying he had exhausted what he can do through executive action and that Congress needed to act.

Old National Bank CEO Jim Ryan issued a statement that the safety of employees and those they serve was extremely important and that the company was deploying employee assistance support.

== See also ==
- Gun violence in the United States
- List of mass shootings in the United States in 2023
- Standard Gravure shooting
- List of filmed mass shootings
