= Preston Pointe =

Building in Louisville, Kentucky

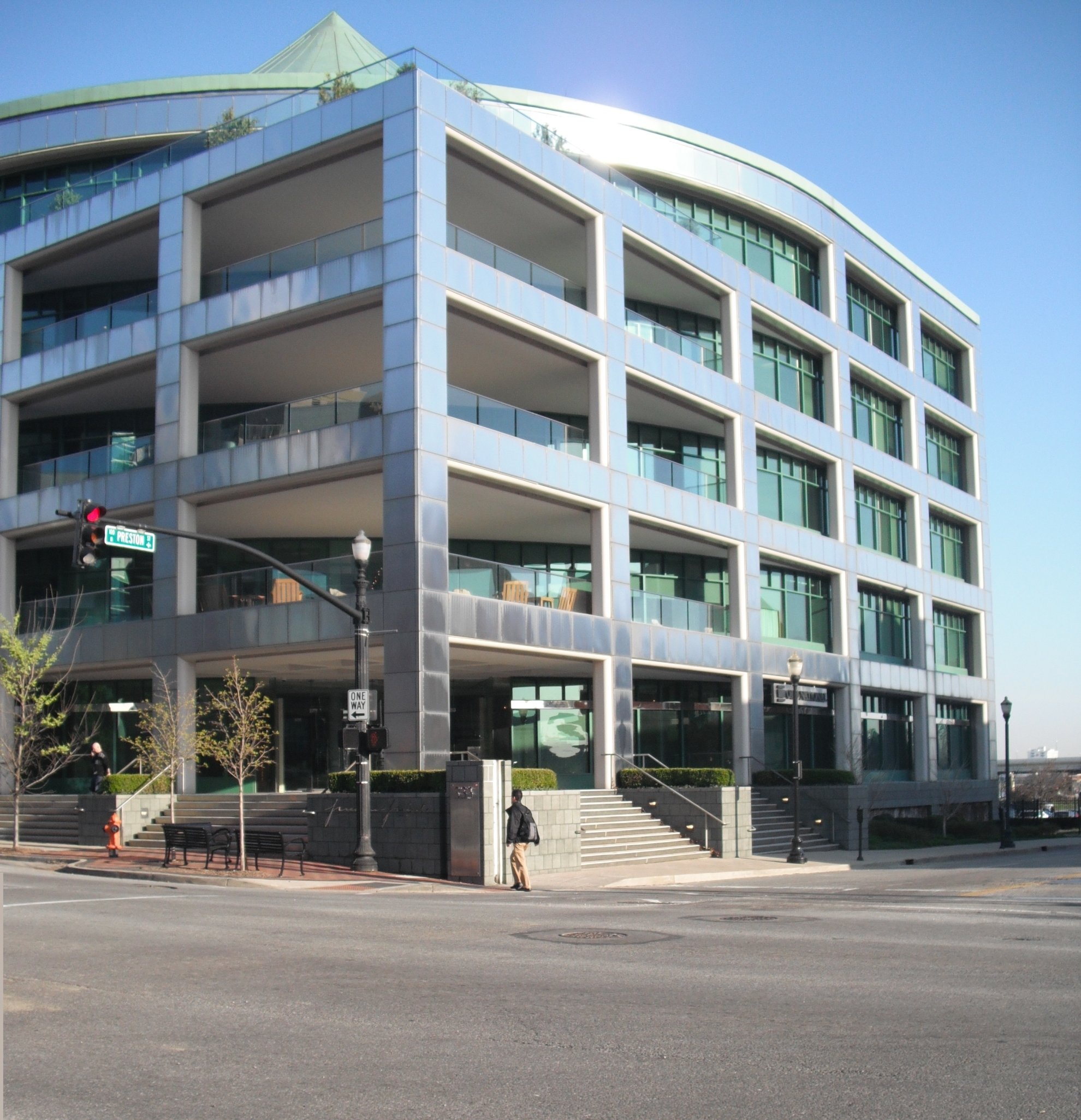
- Interactive map of the Preston Pointe area

General information
- Location: 333 East Main; Downtown Louisville
- Coordinates: 38°15′20.9″N 85°44′46.4″W

Technical details
- Floor count: 7
- Floor area: 63,821 sq ft (5,929.2 m^{2})

Preston Pointe is a mixed-use commercial and residential building in Downtown Louisville, Kentucky. The building is square in shape with a unique sloped steel roof. The first five floors consist of office space, the sixth and seventh consist of two-story condominiums, and the eighth floor is mechanical space.

== Design and construction ==
Preston Pointe was designed and co-developed by Henry Potter and his architectural firm Potter & Associates.

== History ==
Old National Bank began opening a branch in Preston Pointe in October 2004, marking the building's first commercial presence. On April 10, 2023, a mass shooting occurred at the bank by a former employee, prompting Old National Bank to close the location and relocate to 400 W. Market.

== Awards ==
The Kentucky Society of Architects American Institute of Architects (AIA) awarded Preston Pointe the Citation for Excellence in Architectural Design in 2007, with the jury commenting: "This building’s bold, iconic design creates a landmark statement, and as a consequence, brings new vitality and interest to an older urban neighborhood."
