= Louisville Metro Housing Authority =

Government agency based in Louisville, Kentucky

The Louisville Metro Housing Authority is the government agency in Louisville, Kentucky that is charged with providing affordable housing and financial aid to homeowners and renters. It was formed in 2003 from the merger of the Housing Authority of Louisville and Jefferson County Housing Authority.
