= National Register of Historic Places listings in Nelson County, Kentucky =

Location of Nelson County in Kentucky

This is a list of the National Register of Historic Places listings in Nelson County, Kentucky.

This is intended to be a complete list of the properties and districts on the National Register of Historic Places in Nelson County, Kentucky, United States. The locations of National Register properties and districts for which the latitude and longitude coordinates are included below, may be seen in an online map.

There are 43 properties and districts listed on the National Register in the county.

This National Park Service list is complete through NPS recent listings posted May 1, 2026.

== Current listings ==
	Name on the Register	Image	Date listed	Location	City or town	Description
1	Archeological Site 15 Ne 3		September 27, 1979 (#79001027)	11 miles (18 km) north of Bardstown along the road to Lenore; 37°55′55″N 85°30′21″W	Lenore	
2	Baldwin's Tourist Court Residence-Office	Baldwin's Tourist Court Residence-Office	November 10, 2011 (#11000797)	321 W. Stephen Foster Ave. 37°48′36″N 85°28′20″W	Bardstown	No longer extant.
3	Bardstown Historic District	Bardstown Historic District	February 17, 1983 (#83002837)	Roughly bounded by 1st, 3rd (U.S. Routes 31E/150), and 5th Sts., Muir Ave., and railroad track; also generally bounded by 1st St., 5th St., Muir Ave., Beall Ave., Maiden's Alley, Cherry Alley, and Mulberry Alley; 37°48′40″N 85°27′57″W	Bardstown	Second set of boundaries represents a boundary increase of November 10, 2010
4	Beechwold	Beechwold	November 29, 1984 (#84000355)	500 E. Stephen Foster Ave. (U.S. Routes 62/150); 37°48′34″N 85°27′19″W	Bardstown	
5	Bloomfield Historic District	Bloomfield Historic District	March 18, 1991 (#91000234)	Central Bloomfield, including parts of Hill, Main, Perry, and Depot Sts. and Fairfield, Springfield, and Taylorsville Roads; 37°54′43″N 85°19′09″W	Bloomfield	
6	Bruntwood	Bruntwood	September 9, 1975 (#75000814)	714 N. 3rd St. (U.S. Routes 31E/150); 37°49′15″N 85°27′51″W	Bardstown	
7	Cobblestone Path	Cobblestone Path	November 16, 1989 (#89002018)	Eastern end of Flaget Ave., northeastern to Broadway; 37°48′36″N 85°27′46″W	Bardstown	
8	Confederate Monument of Bardstown	Confederate Monument of Bardstown	July 17, 1997 (#97000674)	North Bardstown Cemetery, 0.3 miles south of the junction of U.S. Routes 31E/150 and KY-245; 37°49′28″N 85°27′42″W	Bardstown	
9	Coombs-Duncan-Brown Farmhouse		August 5, 2010 (#10000525)	2985 Chaplin-Taylorsville Rd. 37°56′11″N 85°16′53″W	Bloomfield	
10	Cottage Grove Historic District	Cottage Grove Historic District	April 18, 1991 (#91000390)	1015 Old Bloomfield Pike; 37°49′06″N 85°27′07″W	Bardstown	
11	Culpeper		May 26, 1988 (#88000674)	Northern side of Springfield Rd./U.S. Route 150; 37°47′59″N 85°26′23″W	Bardstown	
12	Henry Duncan House		December 6, 1990 (#90001843)	Taylorsville Rd. north of Maple Grove Cemetery; 37°55′06″N 85°19′01″W	Bloomfield	
13	Edgewood	Edgewood	July 30, 1975 (#75000815)	310 S. 5th St. 37°48′21″N 85°28′17″W	Bardstown	
14	Frankfort and Cincinnati Model 55 Rail Car		October 8, 1998 (#97001344)	136 S. Main St. 37°39′22″N 85°35′34″W	New Haven	
15	Holiday Inn of Bardstown		May 10, 2023 (#100008960)	1875 New Haven Rd. 37°47′14″N 85°29′17″W	Bardstown	
16	Howard Brothers' Store		October 16, 1986 (#86002861)	General Delivery; 37°34′21″N 85°35′32″W	Howardstown	
17	Ben Johnson House	Ben Johnson House	July 16, 1979 (#79001026)	1003 N. 3rd St. (U.S. 31E/150); 37°49′42″N 85°27′38″W	Bardstown	
18	Silvester Johnson House and Business	Silvester Johnson House and Business	April 12, 2002 (#02000345)	151-153 N. Main St. 37°39′31″N 85°35′36″W	New Haven	
19	John S. Kelley House	John S. Kelley House	March 6, 1992 (#91001103)	306 S. 5th St. 37°48′24″N 85°28′18″W	Bardstown	
20	Kurtz Restaurant and Bardstown-Parkview Motel-Office	Kurtz Restaurant and Bardstown-Parkview Motel-Office	November 15, 2011 (#11000798)	418 E. Stephen Foster Ave. 37°48′32″N 85°27′26″W	Bardstown	
21	L & N Steam Locomotive No. 152	L & N Steam Locomotive No. 152	December 30, 1974 (#74000883)	Junction of Depot and 1st Sts. 37°39′25″N 85°35′31″W	New Haven	
22	Louisville and Nashville Combine Car Number 665	Louisville and Nashville Combine Car Number 665	November 19, 1997 (#97001343)	136 S. Main St. 37°39′25″N 85°35′33″W	New Haven	
23	Mattingly House		January 8, 1987 (#87000201)	Off U.S. Route 150; 37°48′27″N 85°25′27″W	Bardstown	
24	Newell B. McClaskey House	Newell B. McClaskey House	March 24, 2000 (#00000269)	1795 KY 1066; 37°55′24″N 85°16′16″W	Bloomfield	
25	MT. BRODERICK Pullman Lounge-Obs-Sleeping Car	MT. BRODERICK Pullman Lounge-Obs-Sleeping Car	November 18, 1997 (#97001345)	136 S. Main St. 37°39′22″N 85°35′34″W	New Haven	
26	My Old Kentucky Home	My Old Kentucky Home	March 11, 1971 (#71000354)	U.S. Route 150, Stephen Foster Ave. 37°48′25″N 85°27′24″W	Bardstown	
27	Nelson County Jail	Nelson County Jail	January 8, 1987 (#87000178)	111 W. Stephen Foster St. 37°48′32″N 85°28′05″W	Bardstown	
28	New Sherwood Hotel	New Sherwood Hotel	March 26, 1992 (#92000291)	138 S. Main St. 37°39′26″N 85°35′37″W	New Haven	
29	Old Kentucky Home Motel	Old Kentucky Home Motel	November 10, 2011 (#11000799)	414 W. Stephen Foster Ave. 37°48′40″N 85°28′28″W	Bardstown	
30	Old L & N Station	Old L & N Station	July 12, 1990 (#87002613)	602 N. 3rd St. (U.S. 31E/150); 37°49′02″N 85°27′53″W	Bardstown	
31	Old Talbott Tavern	Old Talbott Tavern	October 30, 1973 (#73000822)	Court Sq. 37°48′32″N 85°28′03″W	Bardstown	
32	St. Joseph Cathedral and College Complex	St. Joseph Cathedral and College Complex	June 3, 1976 (#76000930)	W. Stephen Foster Ave. 37°48′39″N 85°28′15″W	Bardstown	
33	St. Joseph Proto Cathedral	St. Joseph Proto Cathedral	January 9, 1974 (#74000897)	W. Stephen Foster Ave. 37°48′39″N 85°28′17″W	Bardstown	
34	St. Thomas Roman Catholic Church and Howard–Flaget House	St. Thomas Roman Catholic Church and Howard–Flaget House	July 12, 1976 (#76000931)	3 miles south of Bardstown off U.S. Route 31E; 37°46′00″N 85°29′01″W	Bardstown	
35	T. W. Samuels Distillery Historic District		November 1, 1988 (#88002047)	Junction of KY 523 and Corman Railroad tracks 37°54′00″N 85°33′31″W	Deatsville	
36	Wilson Samuels House		April 2, 2024 (#100010189)	160 South St. Gregory Church Road; 37°53′07″N 85°31′56″W	Samuels	
37	Sisters of Charity of Nazareth Historic District		March 15, 1984 (#84001425)	North of Bardstown off U.S. Route 31E/150; 37°50′59″N 85°28′22″W	Bardstown	
38	Spalding Hall, St. Joseph's College	Spalding Hall, St. Joseph's College	May 7, 1973 (#73000823)	N. 5th St. 37°48′41″N 85°28′16″W	Bardstown	
39	Stone House on Buffalo Creek		August 18, 1983 (#83002838)	Off KY 245; 37°50′29″N 85°31′11″W	Bardstown	
40	John Stone House		July 12, 1984 (#84001885)	U.S. Route 62; 37°54′11″N 85°18′45″W	Bloomfield	
41	Walnut Groves Farm	Walnut Groves Farm	April 1, 1980 (#80001662)	North of Bloomfield on KY 55; also 801 Taylorsville Rd. 37°55′24″N 85°19′15″W	Bloomfield	Taylorsville Road address represents a boundary increase
42	Wickland	Wickland	February 16, 1973 (#73000824)	0.5 miles east of Bardstown on U.S. Route 62; 37°48′47″N 85°27′12″W	Bardstown	
43	Wilson Motel		November 10, 2011 (#11000800)	530 N. 3rd St. 37°49′01″N 85°27′54″W	Bardstown	

== See also ==
- List of National Historic Landmarks in Kentucky
- National Register of Historic Places listings in Kentucky
- List of attractions and events in the Louisville metropolitan area
