= Bardstown station =

- Old L & N Station
- U.S. National Register of Historic Places
- U.S. Historic district – Contributing property
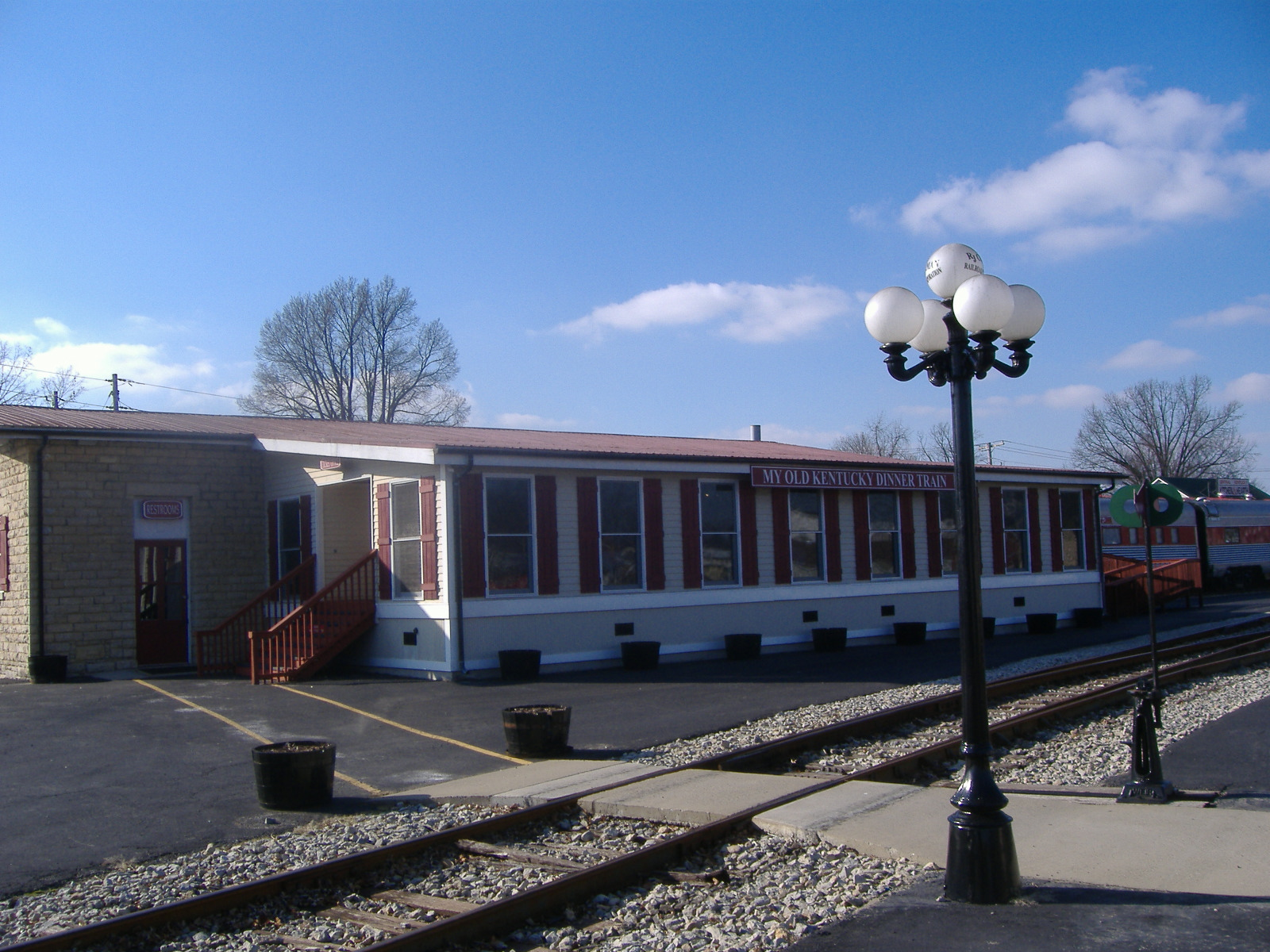
- North side of station

- Location within Kentucky Location within the United States
- Location: 602 N. 3rd Street, Bardstown, Kentucky
- Coordinates: 37°48′52″N 85°27′54″W
- Built: 1860
- Architectural style: Greek Revival
- Part of: Bardstown Historic District (ID83002837)
- MPS: Early Stone Buildings of Kentucky TR
- NRHP reference No.: 87002613

Significant dates
- Added to NRHP: July 12, 1990
- Designated CP: February 17, 1983

The Bardstown station, also known as Old L & N Station, is a historic railroad station on the National Register of Historic Places in the northernmost section of the Bardstown Historic District of Bardstown, Kentucky. Long owned by the Louisville and Nashville Railroad (L&N), it is currently used as the station for the My Old Kentucky Dinner Train, owned by the R.J. Corman Railroad Group.

== History ==
The impetus for a railroad departing south from Louisville was begun in 1832 by the citizens of Bardstown. However, after a $300,000 bond issue was defeated by other residents of Bardstown, the main line of the Louisville and Nashville instead bypassed Bardstown.

The station was built in 1860 by the Bardstown and Louisville Railroad, which the Louisville and Nashville Railroad purchased the assets of in 1864. It was the only railroad station in Kentucky built of dry-stone. However, the 18 miles (29 km) line to connect the station to the L&N's main line wasn't until March 1860.

On February 1, 1888, the line was lengthened to connect Bardstown to Springfield, Kentucky.

In 1953 service was discontinued to the station by the L&N, and the passenger section of the station demolished. In 1987 CSX, who had purchased the L&N in the meanwhile, sold the old Bardstown line, including the station, to the R.J. Corman Railroad Group, which has since used it as a shortline railroad.

Preceding station	Louisville and Nashville Railroad	Following station
Nazareth toward Bardstown Junction	Bardstown Junction – Springfield	Booker toward Springfield

== Structure ==
The total land area of the station is 30 feet (9.1 m) by 75 feet (23 m). Both the structure, exterior, and foundation are made of dry-stone. There are two rooms in the structure. The roof is made of shallow gable. The original passenger section was destroyed in 1953, but a waiting room addition was added to the station in 1992.

== Today ==
Currently the station is part of the complex for the My Old Kentucky Dinner Train, named for the My Old Kentucky Home State Park, where Stephen Foster allegedly got the inspiration for his song My Old Kentucky Home. Customers ride on vintage 1940s-era dining cars pulled by diesel-electric FP7A locomotives for a 150-minute, 37-mile ride to Limestone Springs and back, while engaging in lunch or dinner. Sights to be seen during the ride include Bernheim Forest and the Jim Beam distillery.

== Gallery ==
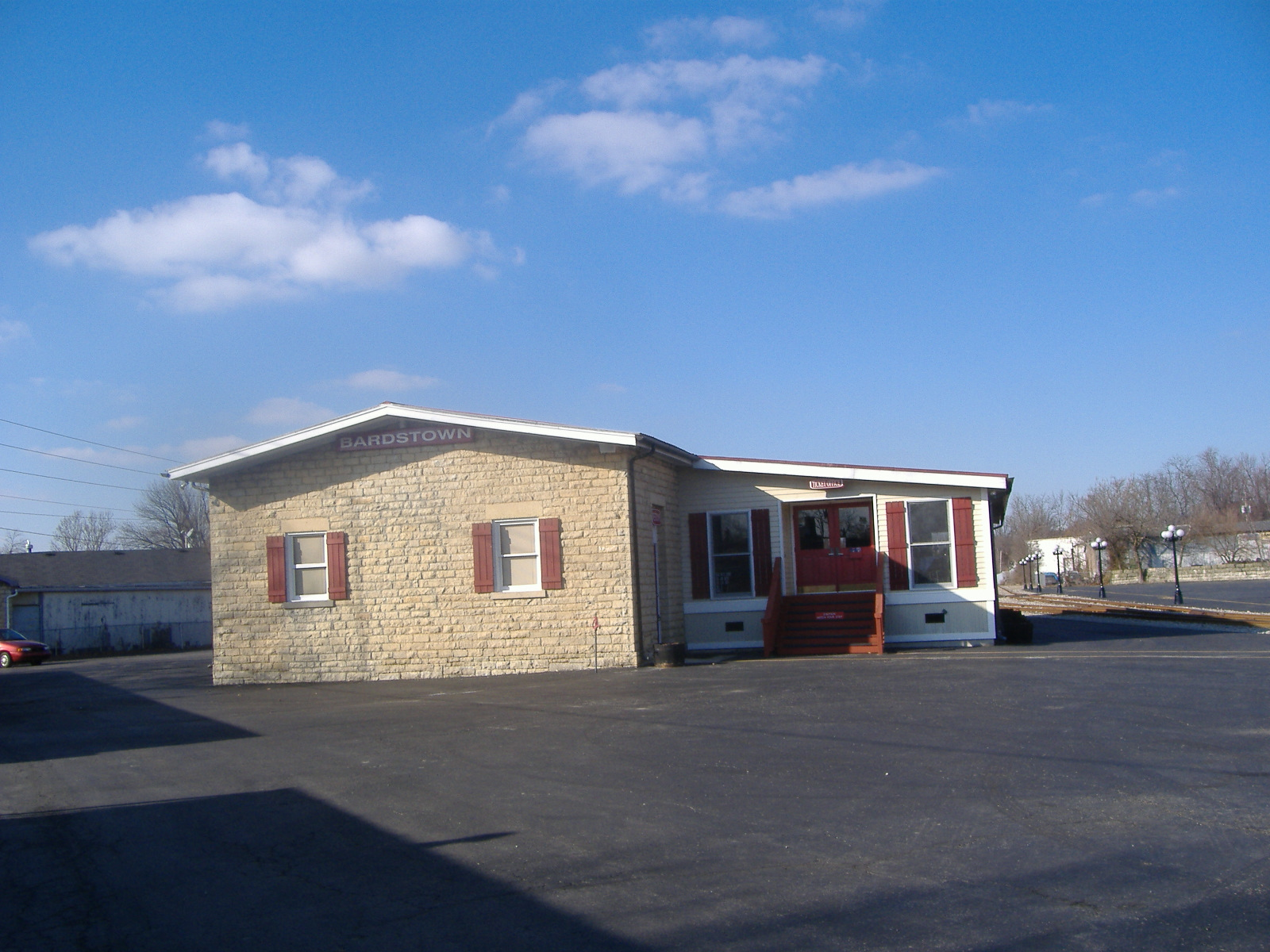
East side of station

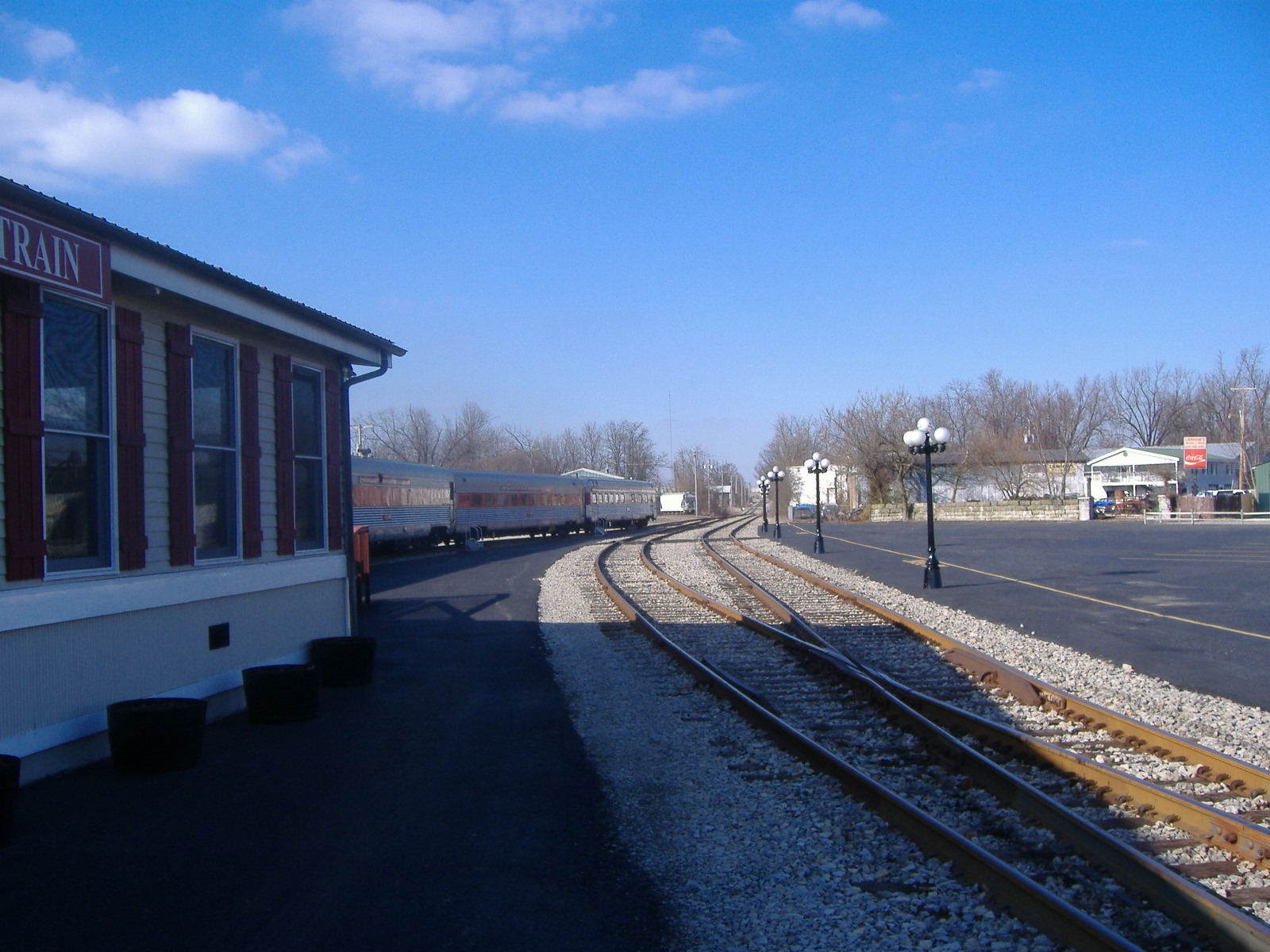
Rails beside the station
