= Bardstown City Schools =

School district in Kentucky, United States

Address
- 308 North Fifth Street Bardstown, Kentucky, 40004; United States
- Coordinates: 37°48′51″N 85°28′08″W

District information
- Type: Public
- Grades: Pre-K–12
- Established: 1908; 118 years ago
- Superintendent: Ryan Clark
- Affiliation: Southern Association of Colleges and Schools

Students and staff
- Enrollment: 2,803 (2023–24)
- Teachers: 156.00 (FTE) (2018–19)
- Student–teacher ratio: 17.67:1 (2018–19)
- District mascot: Tigers
- Colors: Purple Gold

Other information
- Website: bardstown.kyschools.us

Bardstown High School

Location
- 400 North Fifth Street; Bardstown, Kentucky 40004; United States

Information
- School type: Public high school
- School district: Bardstown City Schools
- Principal: Dr. Amy Compton
- Grades: 9–12
- Enrollment: 707 (2023–24)
- Website: bhs.bardstown.kyschools.us

Bardstown Middle School

Location
- 410 North Fifth Street; Bardstown, Kentucky 40004; United States

Information
- School type: Public Secondary
- School district: Bardstown City Schools
- Principal: Mr. Matt Bartley
- Grades: 6–8
- Enrollment: 564 (2023-2024)
- Website: BMS web page

Bardstown Elementary School

Location
- 1345 Templin Avenue; Bardstown, Kentucky 40004; United States

Information
- School type: Public Primary
- School district: Bardstown City Schools
- Principal: Dr. Josh DeWar
- Grades: 2–5
- Enrollment: 853 (2023-2024)
- Website: BES web page

Bardstown Primary School

Location
- 1000 Templin Avenue; Bardstown, Kentucky 40004; United States

Information
- School type: Public Primary
- School district: Bardstown City Schools
- Principal: Dr. John Eveland
- Grades: K-1
- Enrollment: 424 (2023-2024)
- Website: BPS web page

Bardstown Early Childhood Education Center

Location
- 980 Templin Avenue; Bardstown, Kentucky 40004; United States

Information
- School type: Public Preschool
- School district: Bardstown City Schools
- Principal: Mrs. Michelle Sharp
- Grades: PK
- Enrollment: 289 (2023-2024)
- Website: BEC web page

Bardstown City Schools is a school district located in Bardstown, Kentucky that was established in 1908. It operates Bardstown High School, Bardstown Middle School, Bardstown Elementary School, Bardstown Primary School, and Early Childhood Education Center. These six school buildings are located on three campuses with currently 2,803 students enrolled for the 2023–2024 school year.

== See also ==
- Bardstown Historic District
