= Louisville and Nashville Turnpike =

Route information
- Existed: 1829–1901

Major junctions
- North end: Louisville, Kentucky
- South end: Nashville, Tennessee

Location
- Country: United States
- States: Kentucky, Tennessee

Highway system
- Auto trails
- Louisville-Nashville Turnpike Segment
- U.S. National Register of Historic Places
- Location within Kentucky Location within the United States
- Nearest city: Ft. Knox, Kentucky
- Coordinates: 37°57′22″N 85°57′23″W
- Area: 68 acres (28 ha)
- Built: 1837
- Architectural style: stone-arch bridge
- NRHP reference No.: 96000790
- Added to NRHP: July 31, 1996

The Louisville and Nashville Turnpike (Note: Neither section was ever designated as the Louisville and Nashville Turnpike, as this name was only ever used by locals) was a toll road that ran from Louisville, Kentucky to Nashville, Tennessee during the 19th century. From Louisville, one route now designated US 31W ran through Elizabethtown, Munfordville, Glasgow Junction (now Park City), Bowling Green, and Franklin before crossing into Tennessee. In Tennessee, the route would continue through Portland, Cross Plains, Millersville and Goodlettsville before going into Nashville. The other route ran through Bardstown, Buffalo, Glasgow, and Scottsville and is currently named US 31E. The name survives in abbreviated form along routes including Kentucky State Routes 335 and 470. US 31W is usually named for the Dixie Highway which succeeded the Turnpike.

== History ==
US 31W replaced the western segment

US 31E replaced the eastern segment

The western section was first proposed in 1825 by Kentucky Governor Joseph Desha. Approval of charters and allocation of funds was slow to come, typical of turnpike projects at the time, which represented very large endeavors. A portion was first approved in 1829 but was not started before the 3-year limit expired. Sections of the turnpike were approved in five separate Kentucky legislature bills, passed from 1833 to 1849.

Work began in 1837 and by 1849 about 106 miles (171 km) were completed. The surface was macadamized, with toll booths about every 5 miles (8.0 km). Travel from Louisville to Nashville by stagecoach took about 3 days. Traffic was at its peak in the 1850s, but saw a decline in popularity when the Louisville and Nashville Railroad was completed in 1859.

Along the turnpike in Sumner County, Tennessee, there was a small inn owned by Richard Stone Wilks. This inn was the namesake of the town White House, Tennessee. Another building up the road was the Cheek's Tavern which was built by a bridge crossing the Red River, which became notorious for rumors surrounding murders and robbery.

During the latter half of the 19th century the turnpike fell into disrepair, and portions were gradually purchased by the counties through which they ran. In 1901, Jefferson County bought the remaining tolled part of the turnpike for $210,774.54 ($7,035,306.99 in 2022 dollars). Prior to the creation of the Federal United States Numbered Highway System, the portion of the Turnpike from Bowling Green to Louisville was designated as part of the Dixie Highway System. Then on November 11, 1926, the entirety of the old Turnpike's right-of-way were designated as US 31W and US 31E, parts of the pre-Interstate US Numbered Highway System, which has existed to this day.

== Preservation ==
In 1996, a portion of the turnpike was listed on the National Register of Historic Places as Louisville-Nashville Turnpike Segment. The segment includes three stone-arch bridges and a quarry.

A portion of the turnpike which ran through what is now Fort Knox has been preserved in its original form and is known as Bridges to the Past, and in use as a hiking trail. A section of the other Louisville and Nashville Turnpike has been preserved in Bardstown, Kentucky as the Cobblestone Path, which can be seen at the end of Flaget Street in the downtown area.

Two bridges on the former turnpike have survived in Tennessee, both from the western segment. In the Portland area, a stone-arch bridge named Cheek's Tavern Bridge has survived crossing the Red River. It was built around 1841. The second bridge is in Goodlettsville and is named the Old Stone Bridge. It crosses Mansker Creek and was built around 1839.

== Related route ==
Louisville and Nashville Branch Turnpike
- Dickerson Pike

Route information
- Existed: c. 1852-1853–c. 1890s

Major junctions
- North end: Springfield Turnpike / Louisville and Nashville Turnpike in Goodlettsville, Tennessee
- Long Hollow Pike in Goodlettsville
- South end: Brick Church Turnpike in Nashville, Tennessee

Location
- Country: United States
- States: Tennessee

Highway system
- Auto trails

A related turnpike was created in Nashville in 1852 called the Louisville and Nashville Branch Turnpike. It ran from downtown Nashville to Goodlettsville connecting with the main Louisville and Nashville Turnpike. The entire road cost $16,000. By 1903, the turnpike company likely fell into bankruptcy, and the turnpike was renamed Dickerson Pike.
