= Cobblestone Path =

- U.S. National Register of Historic Places
- U.S. Historic district – Contributing property
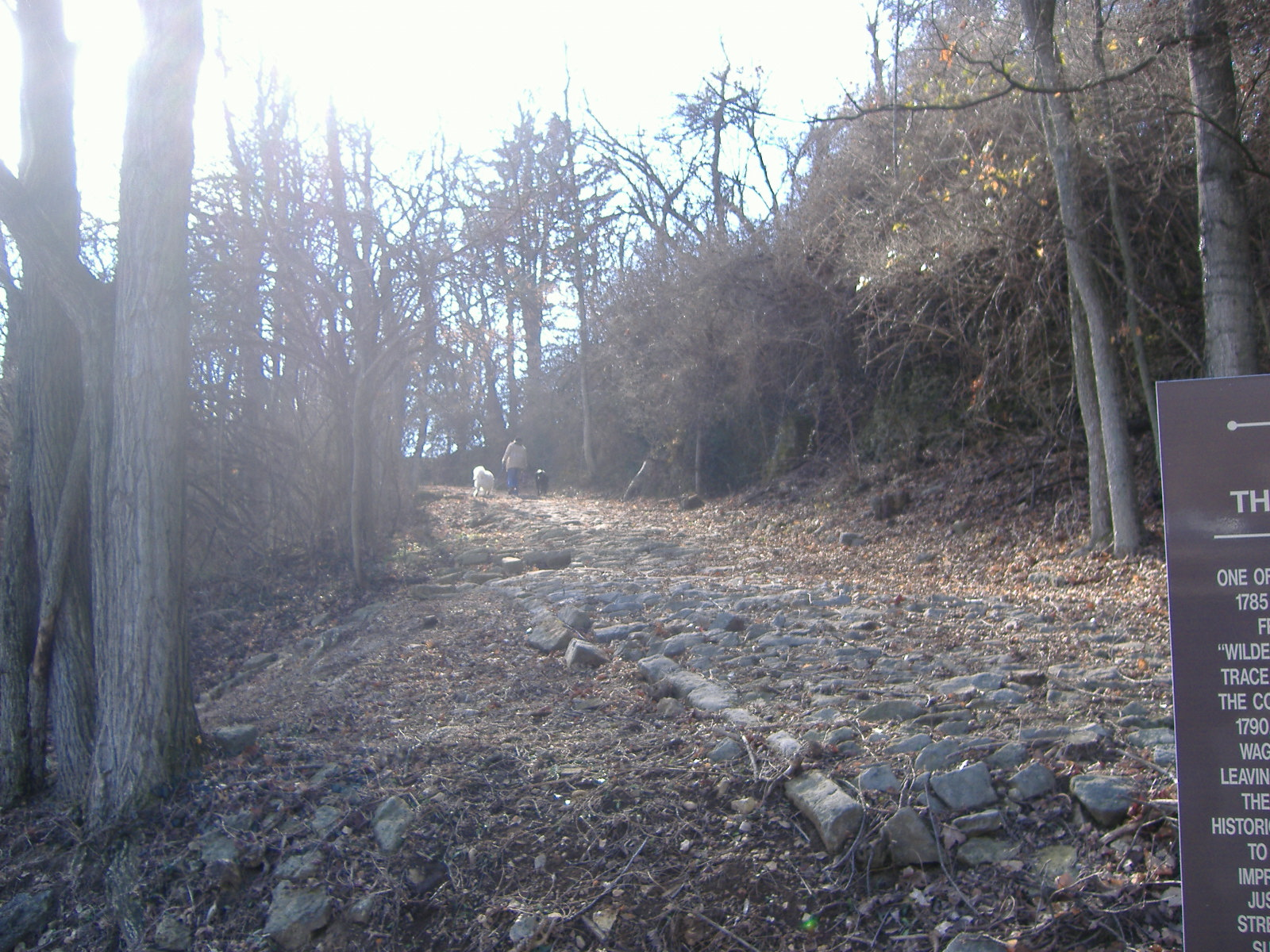

- Location within Kentucky Location within the United States
- Location: E end of Flaget Ave., NE to Broadway, Bardstown, Kentucky
- Coordinates: 37°48′36″N 85°27′46″W
- Built: 1785
- Architectural style: Limestone cobbled-paving
- Part of: Bardstown Historic District (ID83002837)
- NRHP reference No.: 89002018

Significant dates
- Added to NRHP: November 16, 1989
- Designated CP: February 17, 1983

The Cobblestone Path is a historic pathway along the east side of the Bardstown Historic District of Bardstown, Kentucky, passing by eight acres of land. Once longer, due to various construction it now remains between Flaget Avenue and Broadway, directly across from the Bardstown Civil War Museum. Because it was always considered part of the city's street system, the Cobblestone Path is owned by the City of Bardstown, even though it now serves only pedestrian traffic.

== History ==
The Cobblestone Path was built in 1785. The path was built by the citizens of Bardstown. Non-minister men between the ages of 16 and 50 were forced by a corvée law to help build it and the other roads, or be forced to pay a fine of $1.25 a day when they were assigned to work, but didn't. It served as the main entryway to the town of Bardstown from 1785 to 1825, including the Wilderness Road. It was due to this importance that both the Kentucky legislature and the United States Congress paid for its improvements prior to 1800. It was briefly part of the Louisville and Nashville Turnpike as well. With the building of the turnpikes to Bloomfield, Kentucky and Springfield, Kentucky, the pathway was reduced to walkers and equestrians.

The Cobblestone Path lies on top of a bluff created by Stewart's Creek Towne Branch's deep canyon, the other side of which rests My Old Kentucky Home State Park. The remaining path is 350 feet (110 m) long and varies in width from twenty-eight feet to twelve feet. The dolomite limestone used to cobble the pathway are not uniformly shaped, and range from six to ten inches (250 mm) thick. Natural outcroppings of limestone and even a limestone boulder lie beside the path, some of which may serve as a bench. The top portion of the path was long a popular picnic spot from the 1870s to 1900, and gained the name Lovers Leap. Less than thirty feet below the Leap is a small dry cave almost impossible to gain access to.

Erosion has always been a threat to the path, with few cobblestones remaining at the bottom of the path. During the 1920s and 1930s, Mrs. Ernest Fulton planted many flowers along the path, and did her best to fight the erosion. As a result, the path has bush honeysuckle, evergreens, jonquils, and a spruce tree. With this and the natural undergrowth, vines, and native hardwoods, the path is essentially a tunnel.

On November 16, 1989, the Cobblestone Path was placed on the National Register of Historic Places, due to its importance in the history of transportation to Kentucky.

== Gallery ==
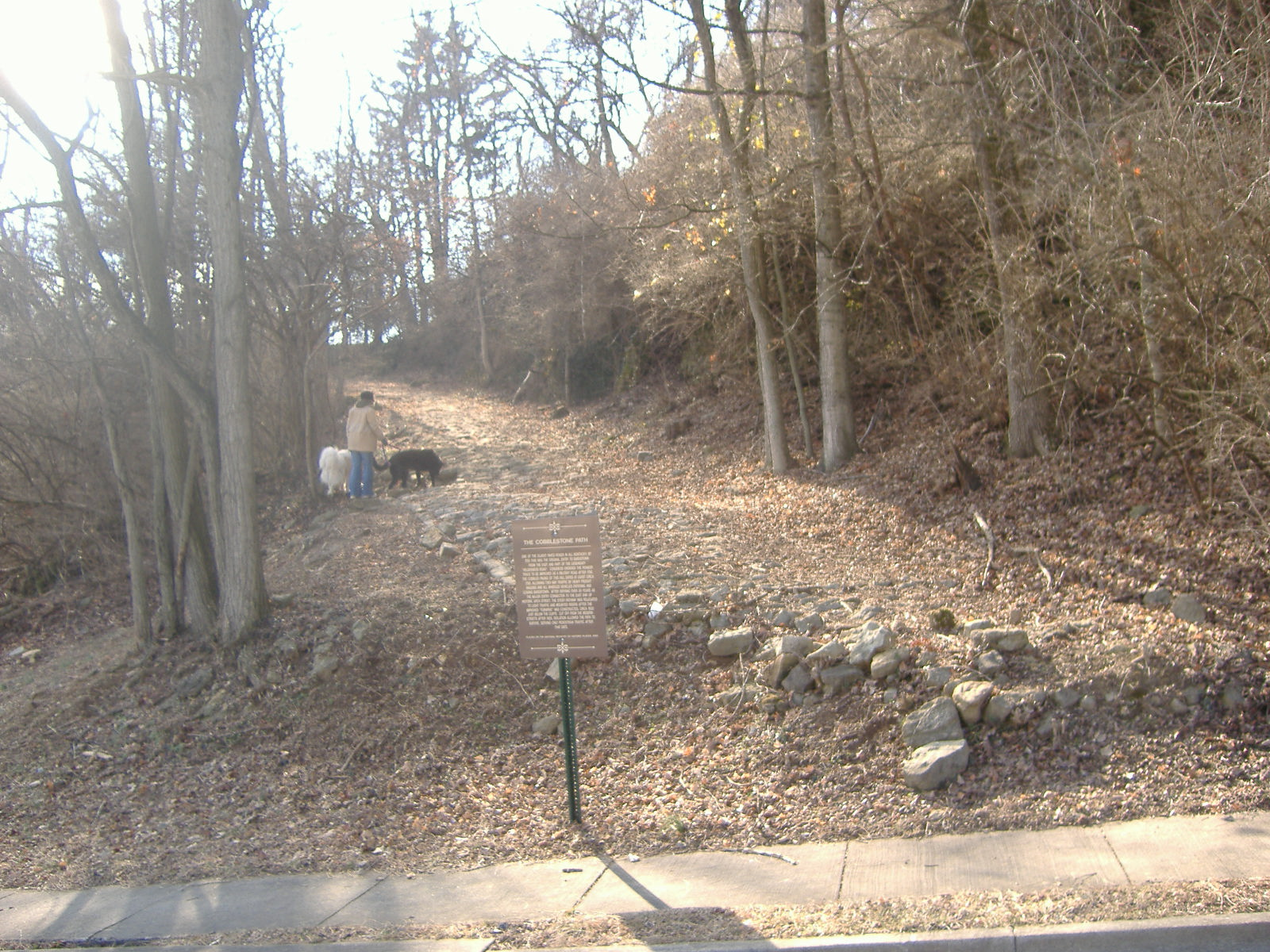

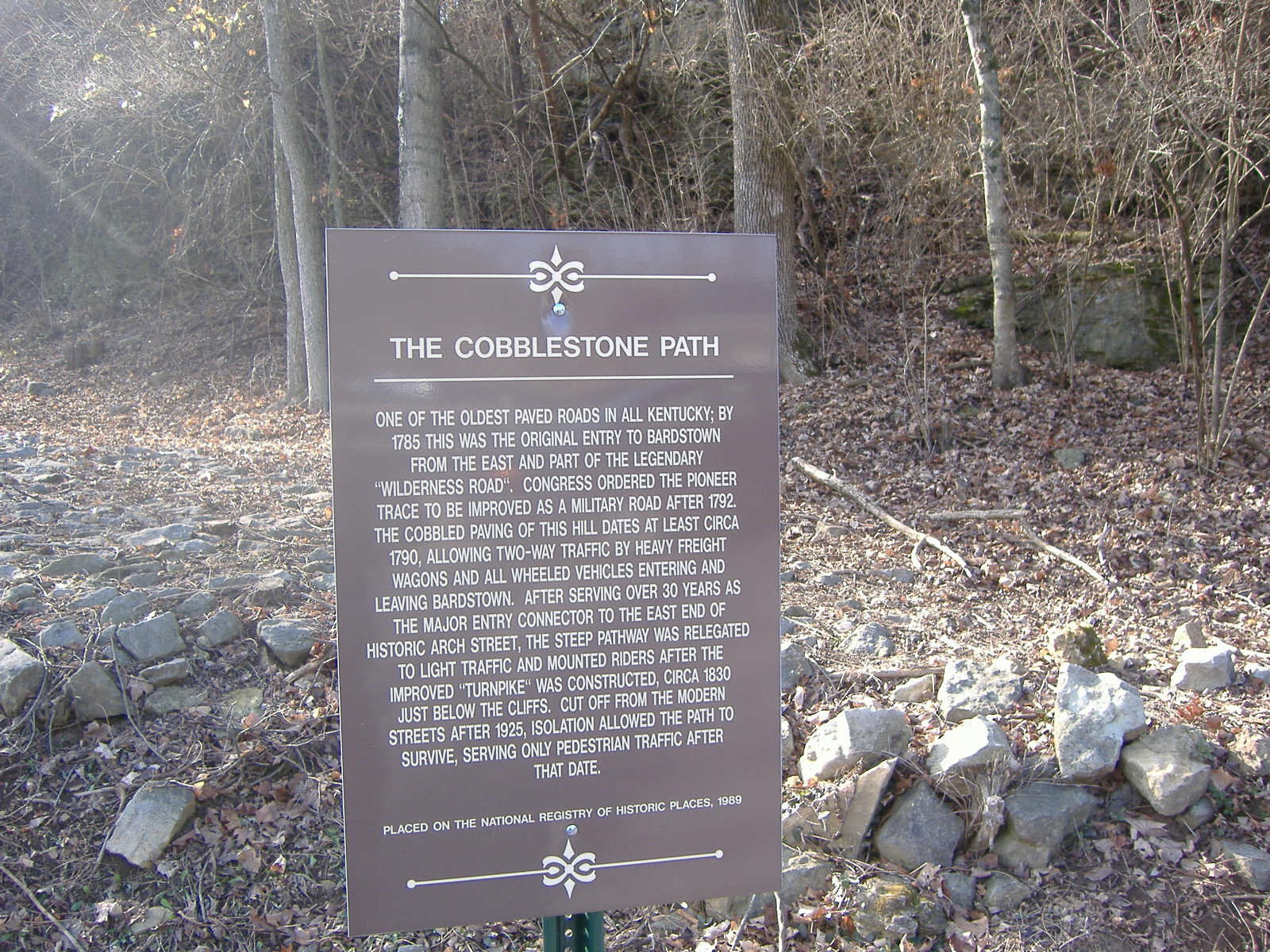
