= Disappearance of Crystal Rogers =

American missing person

Crystal Rogers
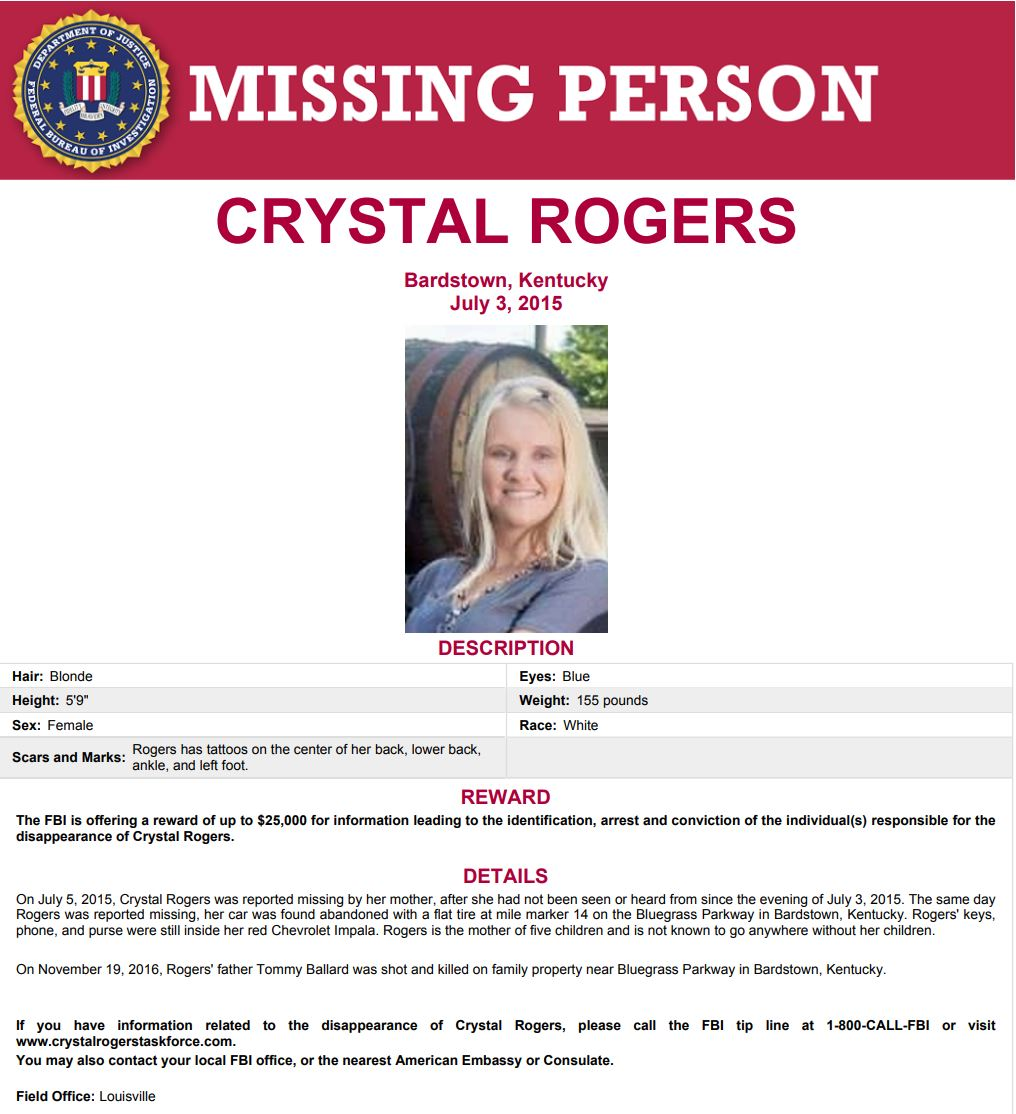
- Crystal Rogers FBI missing poster
- Born: Crystal Maria Ballard; April 4, 1980; Bardstown, Kentucky, U.S.
- Disappeared: July 3, 2015 (aged 34–35); Bardstown, Kentucky, U.S.
- Status: Missing for 11 years, 4 months and 6 days

Crystal Maria Rogers was reported missing from her home in Bardstown, Kentucky, United States, on July 5, 2015. Her car was found on a nearby highway two days later. Authorities believe the case is connected to the unsolved 2016 shooting death of Rogers' father while hunting. In 2023, three area men including her former boyfriend, Brooks Houck, were indicted on charges connected to the case. In 2025, all three men were convicted in connection with Rogers' murder. No trace of Rogers has ever been found.

== Disappearance ==
On July 5, 2015, Crystal Rogers was reported missing by her mother. She had not been seen since July 3, 2015. At the time of her disappearance, the 35-year-old mother of five was living with her boyfriend, Brooks Houck, their two-year-old son, and her other children. Houck is the last person known to have seen her, stating "she was on her phone playing games" at their home when he went to bed. She was gone the next morning when he woke up, and her car was not in the driveway.

Her family began to worry after multiple attempts to contact her that day failed. Two days later, on July 5, Crystal's 2007 Chevrolet Impala was found parked with a flat tire by mile marker 14 of the Bluegrass Parkway. The keys were still in the ignition and her purse and cellphone were also found inside. She was officially reported missing by her mother, Sherry Ballard, the same day.

== Investigation and suspects ==
The Ballard family was very vocal about their suspicion of Brooks Houck having some sort of involvement in Rogers's disappearance early on in the case. In an interview, Crystal's sister said, "[Brooks] has not offered once to search, or help, or do anything for the family." On July 8, Houck was brought in by the Nelson County Sheriff's Office for questioning. Nick Houck, Brooks' brother and a Bardstown Police officer, called mid-interview and told him not to speak with police. The next day, Nick was called to testify in front of a grand jury, which led police to suspect he also had involvement in the disappearance. It was at this time that Nick stopped cooperating with the Sheriff's Office; however, he agreed to a polygraph test after being interviewed by Kentucky State Police. Nick finally took a polygraph test on July 20, after being contacted by the FBI. The examiner expressed "grave concerns" about the results with Bardstown Police Chief McCubbin. On October 16, 2015, Nick was fired from the Bardstown Police Department and Brooks was officially named a suspect in the case.

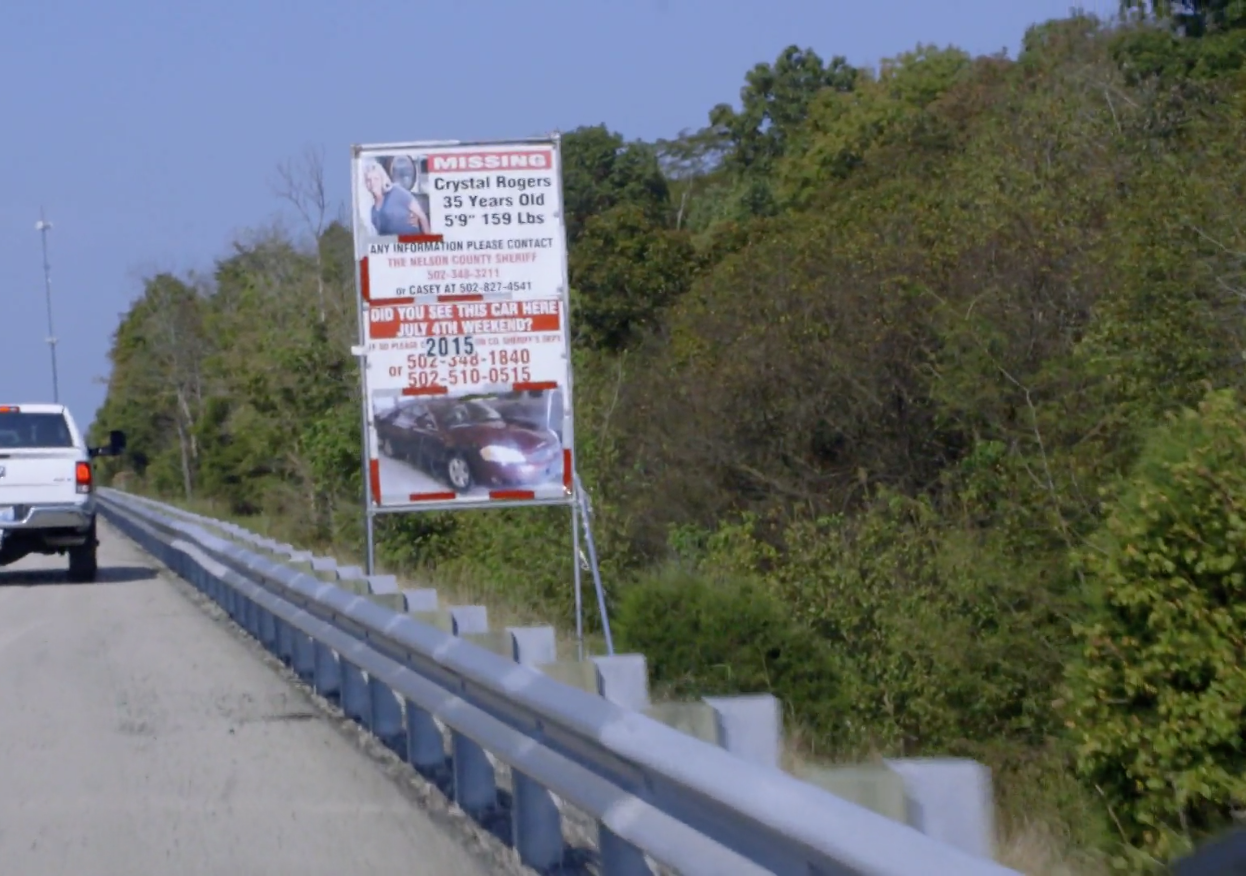
Sign along the Bluegrass Parkway with information on Crystal's disappearance near where her car was found abandoned.

A white Buick became an important piece of evidence when a private investigator found that one was parked at the Houck farm the night Rogers disappeared. The Houck brothers' grandmother, Anna Whitesides, owned a white Buick but sold it several weeks after Rogers went missing. Authorities issued a subpoena for the 82-year-old to testify in front of a grand jury. The subpoena stated the car may have been used to dispose of a body, cleaned, and sold in an attempt to prevent evidence from being discovered. Whitesides refused to testify in front of a grand jury. Attorney Jason Floyd said her statement to police and the car buyer's information was enough. A judge later ruled to keep all future proceedings involving Whitesides confidential. In August 2016, police searched the residences of Whitesides and Nick Houck for DNA.

Despite multiple search efforts and a $100,000 reward being offered for any information, Rogers remains missing. Ramon Pineiroa, the new Nelson County Sheriff appointed in 2019, has stated his commitment to solving the case. In an interview, Pineiroa said the agency has a good idea of what happened to Rogers, and his mission is to find enough facts and evidence to make an arrest.

== Murder of Tommy Ballard ==
Sixteen months after Rogers disappeared, her 54-year-old father, Tommy Ballard, was shot and killed on the morning of November 19, 2016. He had been hunting on his private property with his 12-year-old grandson, Rogers' eldest son, when he was shot once in the chest. Police have cleared the grandson of foul play and have also ruled out suicide, as Tommy's gun was never fired. The Federal Bureau of Investigation is seeking information in Ballard's unsolved death, which is classified as a homicide.

== FBI in Bardstown ==
The FBI has conducted two searches in Bardstown; the first search occurred during August 2020 and the second was in August 2021. The second search took place in the Woodlawn Springs subdivision, where Brooks Houck's construction company built several houses shortly after the disappearance of Crystal Rogers. The FBI has not disclosed any details of their findings at this location, but on August 27, 2021, they did announce that an "item of interest" had been recovered from the concrete at one of the homes. During this most recent search, the FBI also stated that they know there are people in Bardstown who have information on this case, and added that it was time for those people to come forward.

== 2023 indictments and 2025 trials ==
In September 2023, a Nelson County grand jury indicted a local man, Joseph Lawson (born 1991), 32, on charges of conspiracy to commit murder and complicity in tampering with physical evidence. The indictment did not identify a victim. However, the dates given for the murder correspond with Rogers' disappearance and her relatives confirmed they had been notified of the indictment before it was made public.

Rogers' former boyfriend, Brooks Houck (born 1982), was arraigned in Nelson Circuit Court on October 5, 2023, on a murder charge; he had been arrested the previous week. Prosecutor Shane Young asked for a $10 million bond. The prosecutor also revealed investigators had recovered a gun sold by Houck's brother under an assumed name that could be a match for the murder weapon in the killing of Rogers' father, Tommy Ballard.

In December 2023, Steve Lawson, Joseph's father, was arrested and indicted on charges of conspiracy to commit murder.

In May 2025, Steve Lawson was convicted of conspiracy to commit murder and tampering with physical evidence and sentenced to 17 years in prison. In July 2025, Houck was found guilty of Rogers' murder and complicity in tampering with physical evidence. Joseph Lawson was also convicted of conspiracy to commit murder and tampering with physical evidence. On September 17, Houck was sentenced to life in prison, while Joseph Lawson was sentenced to 25 years in prison.

No trace of Rogers has been found since her disappearance. Authorities presume Rogers to be dead.

== See also ==
- List of people who disappeared mysteriously (2000–present)
