= Old Talbott Tavern =

- U.S. National Register of Historic Places
- U.S. Historic district – Contributing property
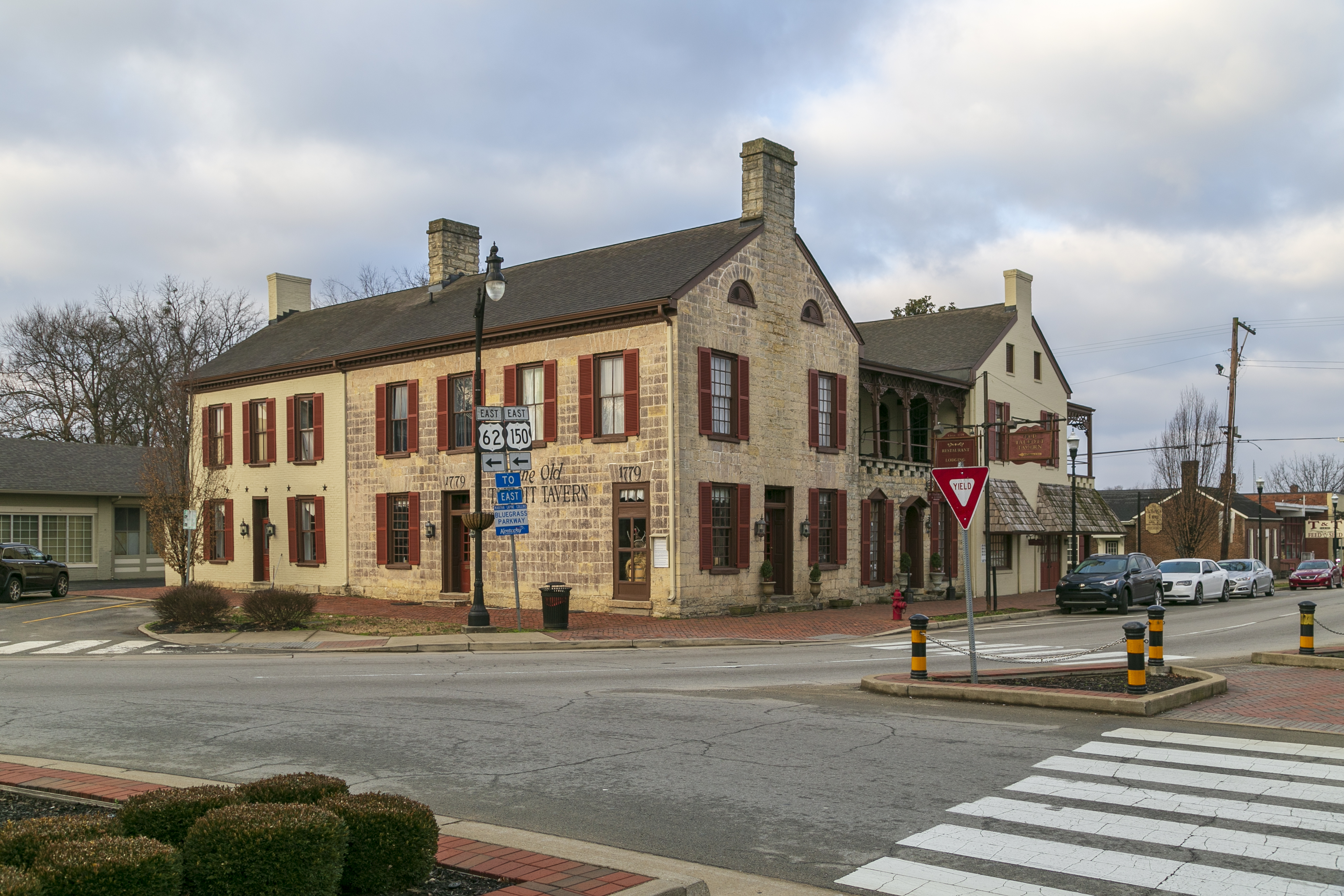
- The Tavern in 2020

- Location within Kentucky Location within the United States
- Location: Bardstown, Kentucky
- Coordinates: 37°48′32″N 85°28′3″W
- Built: 1779
- Website: talbotttavern.com
- Part of: Bardstown Historic District (ID83002837)
- NRHP reference No.: 73000822

Significant dates
- Added to NRHP: October 30, 1973
- Designated CP: February 17, 1983

The Old Talbott Tavern, also known as the Old Stone Tavern, a historic tavern built in 1779, is located in the Bardstown Historic District of Bardstown, Kentucky, across from the historic Nelson County Courthouse. It was placed on the National Register of Historic Places on October 30, 1973.

According to tradition, the tavern has never closed since its opening in 1779. It is rumored as well to have guests that have never checked out. Each room is named after a historical person who is said to haunt the corresponding room. It is likely the oldest surviving building in the state of Kentucky.

== History ==
The Old Talbott Tavern was built in 1779, a year before the settlement of Salem (later renamed Bardstown) began, making it the "oldest western stagecoach stop" still in operation. According to an old map of Bardstown, the lot was originally purchased by a man named Hynes; the tavern was called the Hynes Hotel. It was strategically located near the end of the stagecoach road that once led east to Philadelphia and Virginia. George Rogers Clark used it as a resource base during the end of the American Revolutionary War; Daniel Boone stayed here, and the exiled Louis-Philippe of France, stayed at the tavern on October 17, 1797, with a member of his entourage painting murals that were rediscovered in the 20th century and were on display until the 1998 fire.

Visitors in the 19th century included future presidents Andrew Jackson, William Henry Harrison, and Abraham Lincoln. Lincoln's parents stayed at the tavern when a court ruling went against them, leading the family to move to Indiana when Lincoln was seven years old. Other prominent figures who visited the tavern were Henry Clay, the inventor of steamboats John Fitch, environmentalist John James Audubon, songwriter Stephen Foster, and Jesse James, who is said to have been the cause of the bullet holes in the murals as he was drunk and shooting at the birds in the tree on the mural.

George Talbott purchased the tavern in 1886. Within two years, six of his children died in the tavern.

Queen Marie of Romania is known to have lunched at the tavern in 1926. Likewise, World War II general George Patton once visited the tavern.

Throughout its history, the tavern has been called different names: Hynes House, Bardstown Hotel, Chapman's House, Shady Bower Hotel, the Newman House, Talbott Hotel, Talbott Tavern, and the Old Stone Tavern. The Talbott Tavern was the official name from 1885 to 1968.

On March 7, 1998, a fire damaged the tavern, severely damaging the roof and second floor. The fire also damaged the Louis-Philippe murals, which have still not been restored. The renovations to repair the fire damage were described as "generic". The Old Talbott Tavern reopened on November 8, 1999.

The Old Talbott Tavern currently serves as both a restaurant and a five-room bed and breakfast. A writer for Travel and Leisure magazine described it as having "slightly spooky charm". It has been featured on Food Network and Travel Channel, and was once ranked the 13th most haunted inn in the United States.

The inn's most famous ghost is the outlaw Jesse James. Legend has it that even now he haunts the inn. Another legend is that of a mysterious woman who continues her haunting of the hotel.

It is next to the historic Nelson County Jail.

== Construction ==
The original tavern consisted of the present eastern section, built of stone walls two feet thick and heavy ceiling timbers, with two separate fireplaces to cook the food. It originally had two guest rooms on the second floor: one for men and one for women, as individual rooms for guests did not become widespread in the United States until the early 19th century. The brick western section was built a century later.

== See also ==
- Gaines Tavern History Center: Walton, Kentucky
- Old Stone Tavern: Frankfort, Kentucky
- Sherman Tavern: Sherman, Kentucky
- National Register of Historic Places listings in Nelson County, Kentucky
