= Nelson County Jail =

- U.S. National Register of Historic Places
- U.S. Historic district – Contributing property
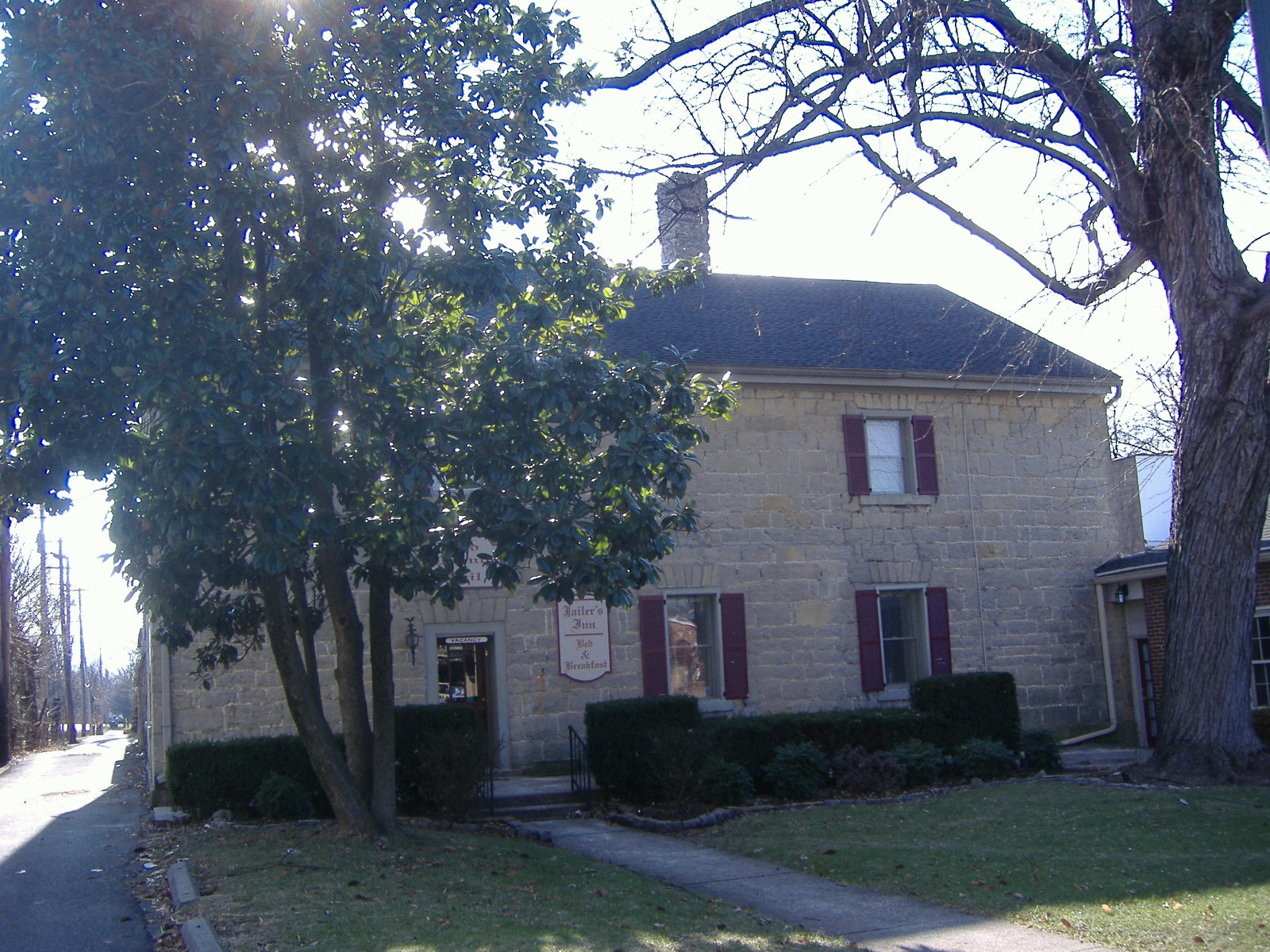

- Location within Kentucky Location within the United States
- Location: 111 W. Stephen Foster, Bardstown, Kentucky
- Coordinates: 37°48′33″N 85°28′3″W
- Built: 1800
- Architectural style: Italianate, Federal
- Part of: Bardstown Historic District (ID83002837)
- MPS: Early Stone Buildings of Kentucky Outer Bluegrass and Pennyrile TR
- NRHP reference No.: 87000178

Significant dates
- Added to NRHP: January 8, 1987
- Designated CP: February 17, 1983

The historic Nelson County Jail in the Bardstown Historic District in Bardstown, Kentucky is a property on the National Register of Historic Places. It is next door to the Old Talbott Tavern.The property served as Nelson County, Kentucky's jail from 1797 to 1987. The old jail was originally built in 1819.

== Contents of the jail ==
The addition was built in 1874. It has two stories, three bays and an attic, with a total land area of 36 feet by 56 feet. The stones of the main building is of laurel dolomite, and are 30 inches thick. The roof is gabled. There was living space for the man employed as jailer, and was done in the Federal architectural style.

The 1874 addition is behind the 1819 main building. It is a two-story, five-bay, building made of dry stone. When it was constructed, the entire first building was made into the jailer's residence. A tall stone wall was built around the new jail.

== Further info ==
When placed on the National Register it was still an active jail, the only such early stone jail still in use in Kentucky. It currently serves as the Jailer's Inn Bed and Breakfast, having stopped being an active jail in 1987. After Nelson County stopped using it as a jail, it was sold on public auction. It was purchased by Paul, Challen and Fran McCoy, and in 1989 opened as a bed and breakfast. It has six guest rooms, with one of the rooms featuring bunks that were used by the prisoners during its years as a jail.

The Travel Channel ranked the place as one of the ten most haunted places in the United States. One of the purported ghosts was of a man, Martin Hill, who died painfully while waiting to be hanged for murdering his wife. A psychic that spent the night said that most of the spirits were peaceful.
