= Wickland (Bardstown, Kentucky) =

Historic house in Kentucky, United States

- U.S. National Register of Historic Places
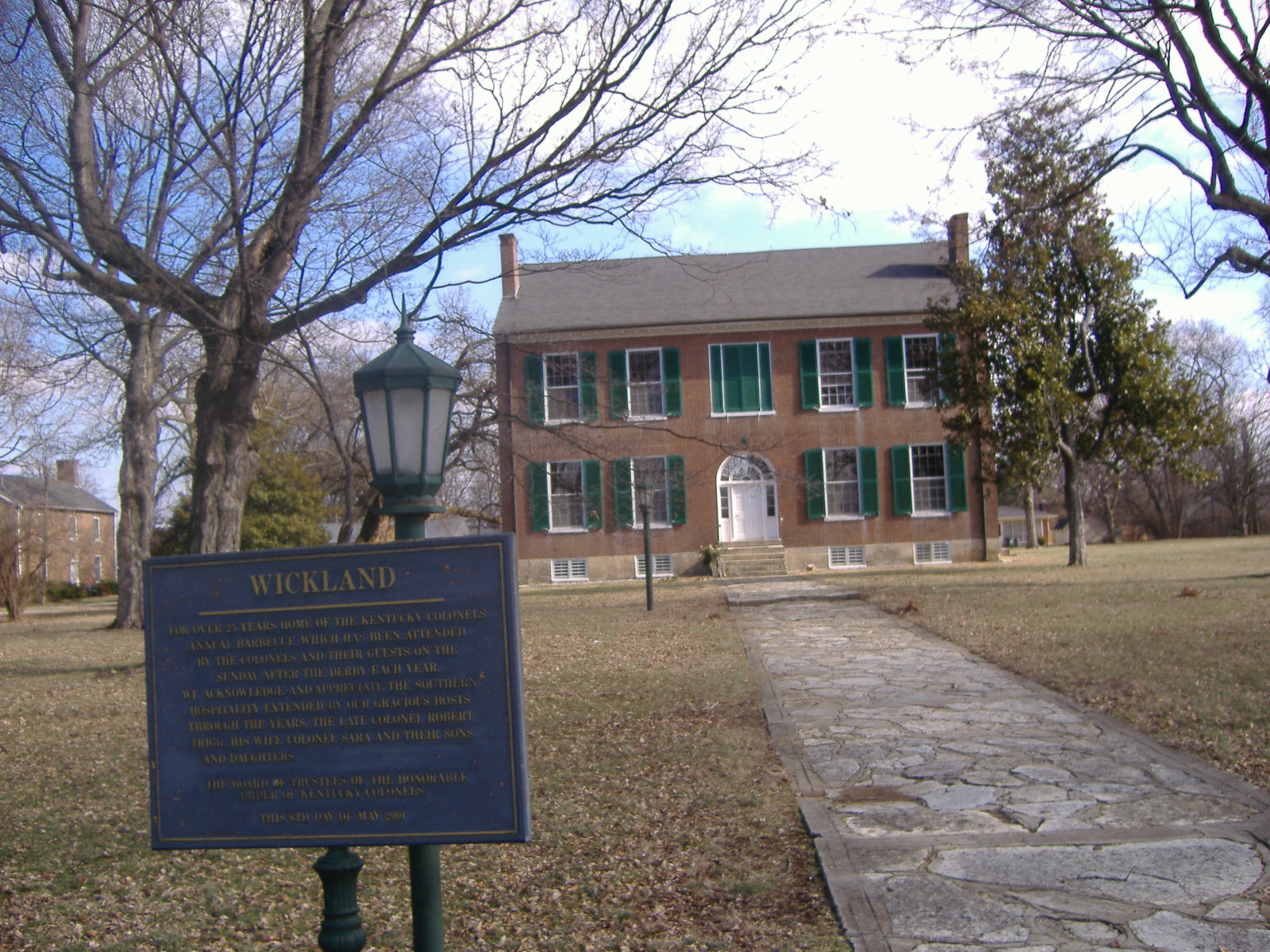

- Location within Kentucky Location within the United States
- Location: 0.5 mi. E of Bardstown on U.S. 62, Bardstown, Kentucky
- Coordinates: 37°48′49″N 85°27′8″W
- Built: 1815
- Architectural style: Georgian
- NRHP reference No.: 73000824
- Added to NRHP: February 16, 1973

Wickland is a historic mansion in eastern Bardstown, Kentucky. It has been the home of three state governors: two for Kentucky, and one in Louisiana.

== Description ==
Wickland is a three-story mansion considered one of the best domestic Georgian buildings in the commonwealth of Kentucky. The first and second floors have identical floor plans. Each has a 44-by-14-foot (13.4 by 4.3 m) hall with four well proportioned rooms on each side. On the first floor the dining room and the library are on opposing sides. The third floor consists of a front attic and two ample rooms. The staircase which connects all three floors is cantilevered from the walls, with no visible support.

Originally, the kitchen was separated from the house by an open porch. It was a two-story building, with the second floor being used by transient workers and as a nursery. The roof tiles had been replaced four times from its construction in 1815 to 1972. In the 1930s amenities were added to the house, which included running water, electricity, baths, and furnaces.

Two other buildings are part of the 66-acre (27 ha) property. One is a heated outhouse large enough for two rooms. The other is a two-story brick building the Wickliffe family lived in before the construction of Wickland.

== History ==
Wickland was built between 1813 and 1817 for Charles A. Wickliffe, a Whig member of the Kentucky House of Representatives. Wickliffe used plans by John M. Brown and John Rogers. From September 27, 1839, to September 2, 1840, Wickliffe served as governor of Kentucky. Wickliffe's son Robert C. Wickliffe was governor of Louisiana from 1856 to 1860. J. C. W. Beckham, grandson of Charles, was born at Wickland and became governor of Kentucky from 1900 to 1907, later serving a term as United States senator. Hence, the nickname for Wickland "Home of Three Governors".

The Wickland in Shelbyville is named for this mansion. The wife of its builder, Charles Marshall, was the former Elizabeth Wickliffe, the daughter of Robert C. Wickliffe.

The Honorable Order of Kentucky Colonels had an annual barbecue at the site, on the Sunday after the Kentucky Derby, for 25 years. They placed a marker by the house denoting the fact.

It is open for tours from March to October.

== Gallery ==
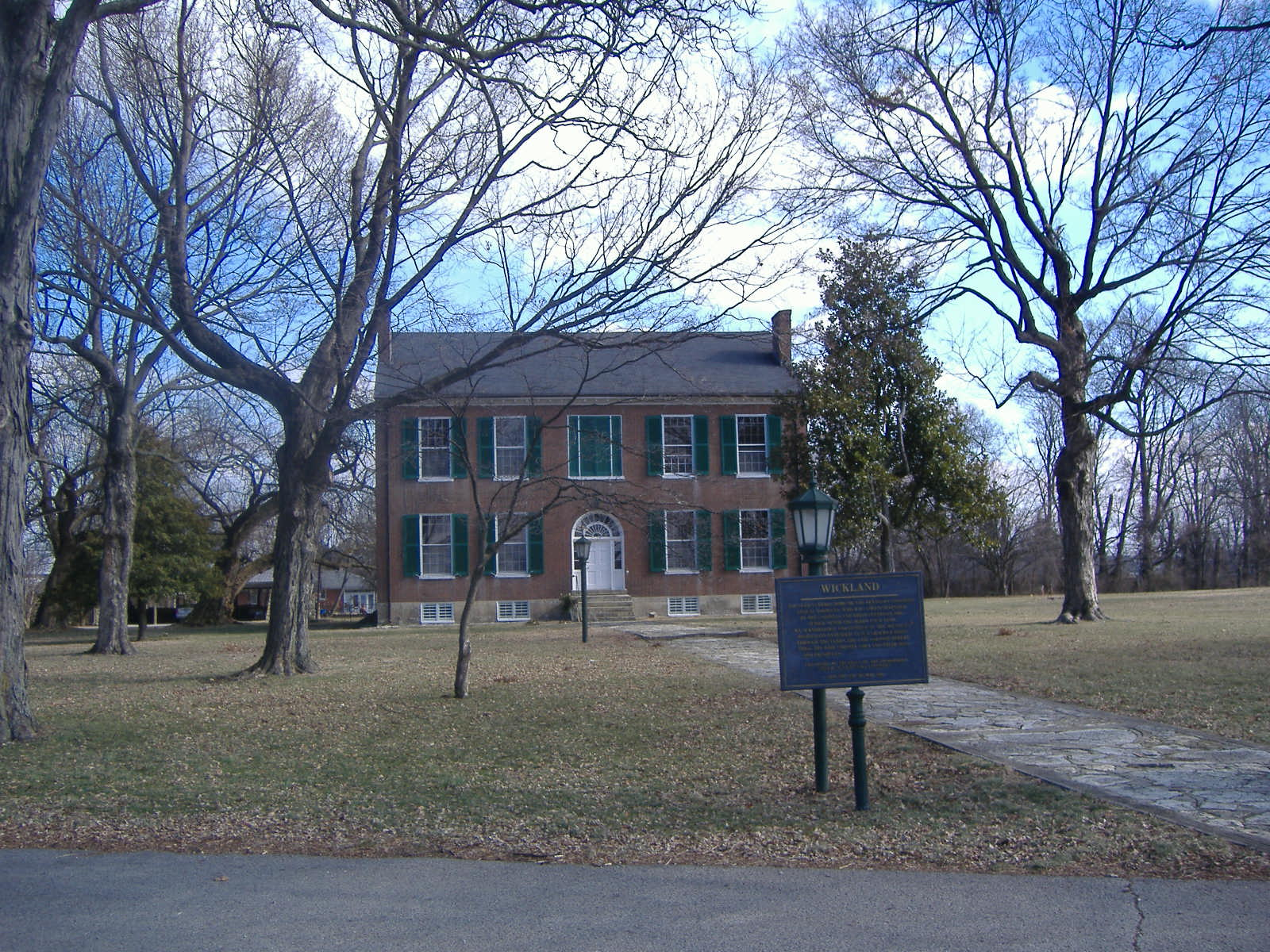

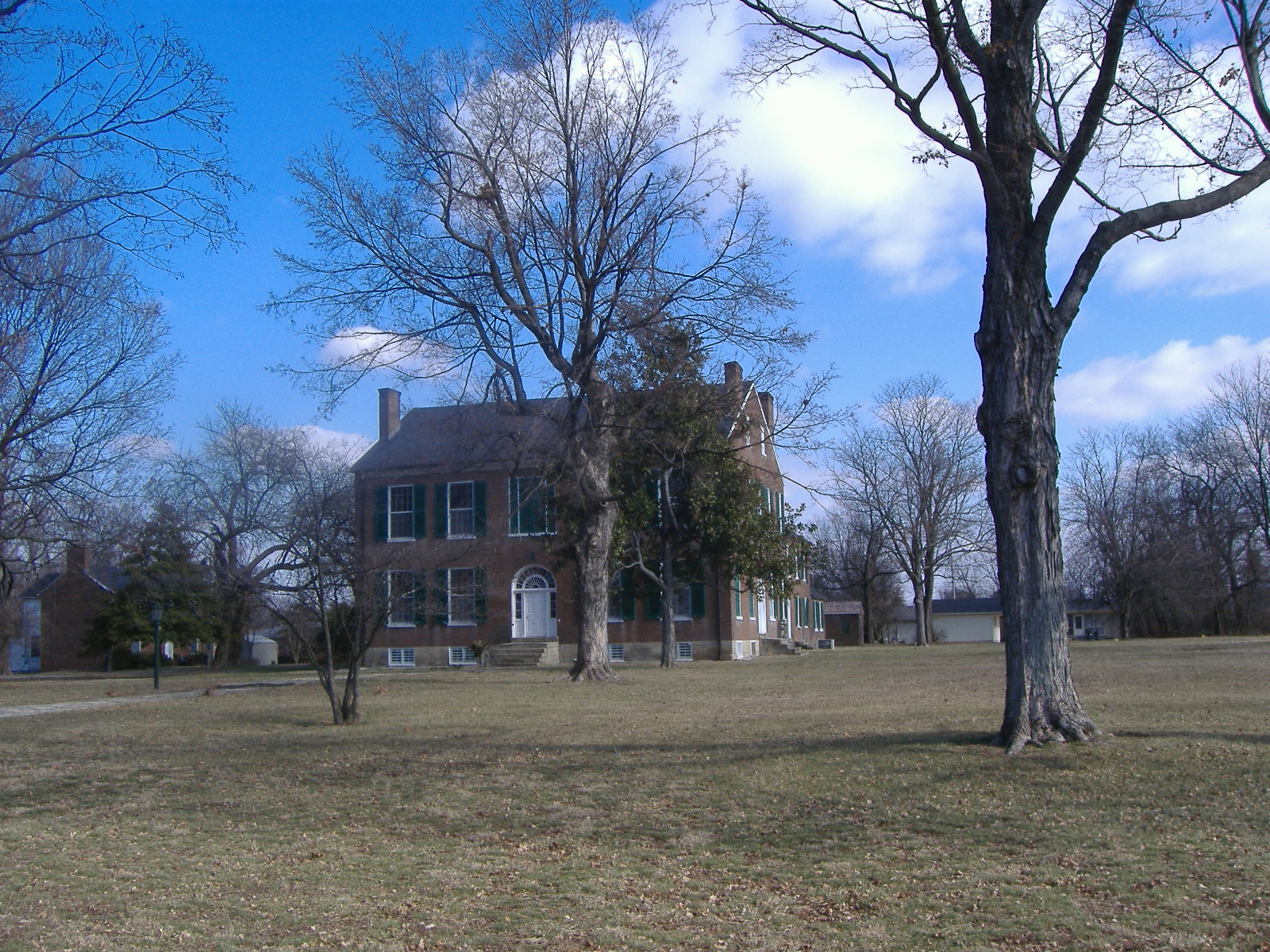

== See also ==
- National Register of Historic Places listings in Nelson County, Kentucky
