= Bardstown Junction, Kentucky =

Unincorporated community in Kentucky, United States

Coordinates: 37°56′24″N 85°41′58″W

Bardstown Junction is an unincorporated community in Bullitt County, Kentucky, in the United States.

== History ==
Bardstown Junction was built up at the junction of two railroads. A post office was established at Bardstown Junction in 1866, and remained in operation until it was discontinued in 1957.
