= Bardstown Historic District =

Historic district in Kentucky, United States

- U.S. National Register of Historic Places
- U.S. Historic district
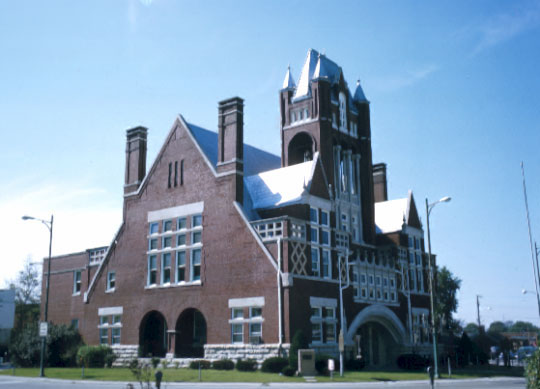
- The 1892 County Courthouse, now the Bardstown Visitor Center

- Location within Kentucky Location within the United States
- Location: Bardstown, Kentucky
- Coordinates: 37°48′40″N 85°27′57″W
- Architectural style: Georgian, Federal
- NRHP reference No.: 83002837
- Added to NRHP: February 17, 1983

The Bardstown Historic District, comprising the center of Bardstown, Kentucky, is a registered historic district on the National Register of Historic Places. Prominent architecture located within the district include the Cobblestone Path, Nelson County Jail, Old L & N Station, Old Talbott Tavern, and Spalding Hall, all individually on the National Register, and the historic old Nelson County Courthouse.

The district consists of twenty-six blocks with a total of 279 properties. Over one third of the buildings in the district are Federal or Georgian architecture dating from the 1780s to 1850, reflecting Bardstown's status as one of the first towns in Kentucky, first settled in 1780 and formally established in 1788. Twenty-four of the blocks are in the initial grid pattern used to lay out the town's lots in 1797.

The town was originally to be called Salem when it was first settled in 1780 by 33 people, on land given as 1,000-acre (4 km^{2}) grant to John Owings and David Bard by Virginia governor Patrick Henry. Bard sent his brother William Bard to manage the holdings, and with William donating 2 acres (8,100 m^{2}) for a courthouse, the town was renamed Bardstown. In 1789 alone 150 log houses were built in the district. In the antebellum area the district became a cultural center for nearby localities, especially for Catholics; Bardstown had the largest concentration of Catholics of any town in Kentucky for a time. Its decline began when the Louisville and Nashville Railroad decided to initially bypass Bardstown, not building a railroad for the town until 1860, and not extending the line from Bardstown until 1887, after which Bardstown's population remained steady until it became the center of bourbon production.

At different times during the Civil War, commanders from both armies held their headquarters within the district.

The Old Courthouse, which lies in the center of the district surrounded by US 31E and US 150, was constructed in 1892 at the cost of $30,000. It now serves as the Visitor Center for Bardstown, with the new courthouse being built where the original Wal-Mart in Bardstown was located.

Thanks to the Nelson County Historical Society and the 1965 Historical District Zoning laws, much of the district retains its historical nature, save for a few commercial buildings along Third Street, also known locally as Louisville Road (which eventually reaches Louisville, where it is called Bardstown Road). By the 1980s over 200,000 tourists visited the town, which has steadily increased due to the continuing attractions of the Kentucky Bourbon Festival and My Old Kentucky Home State Park, located on the next hill to the east of the historic district.

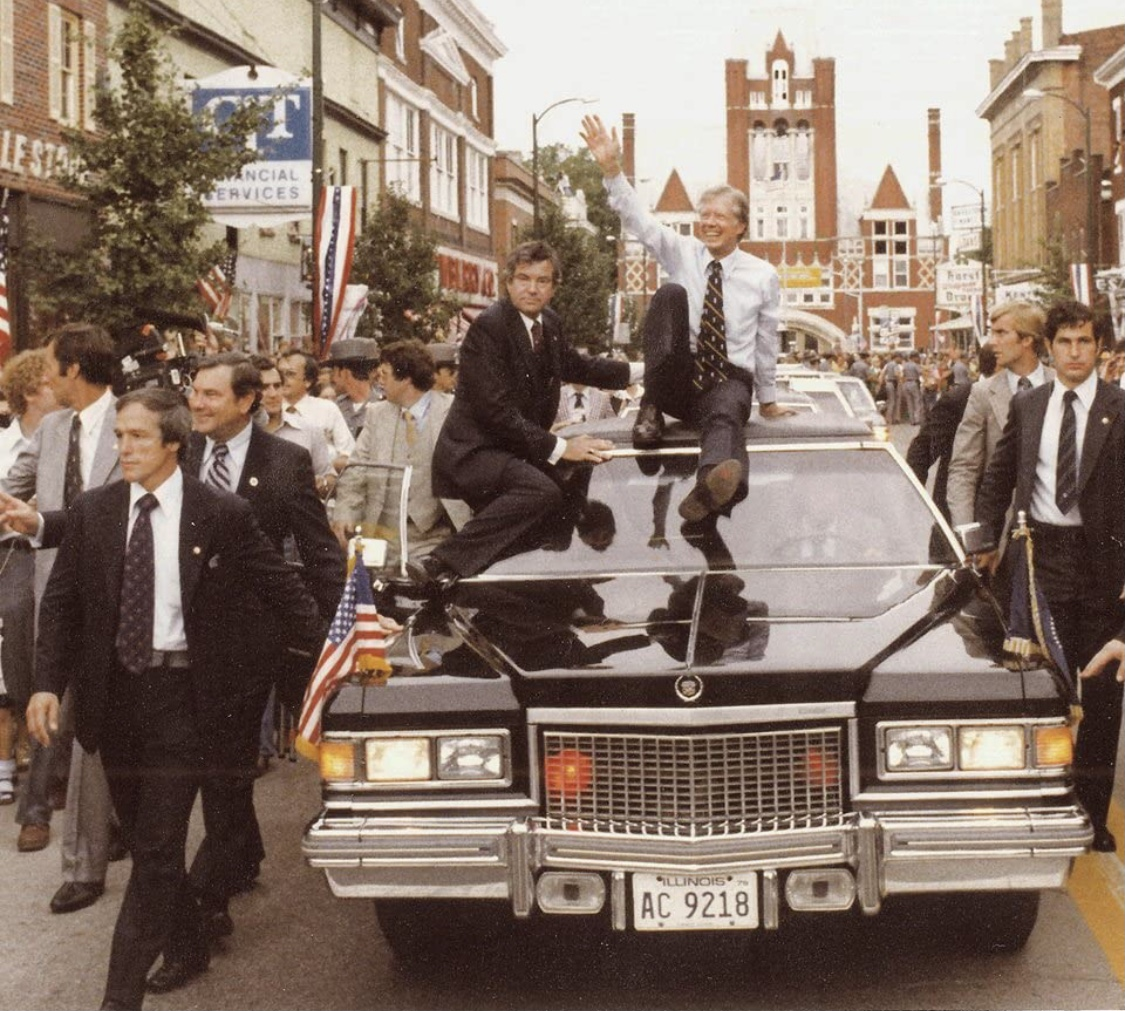
President Jimmy Carter visiting Bardstown in 1979

United States President Jimmy Carter held a town hall meeting in the district in 1979.

== Gallery ==
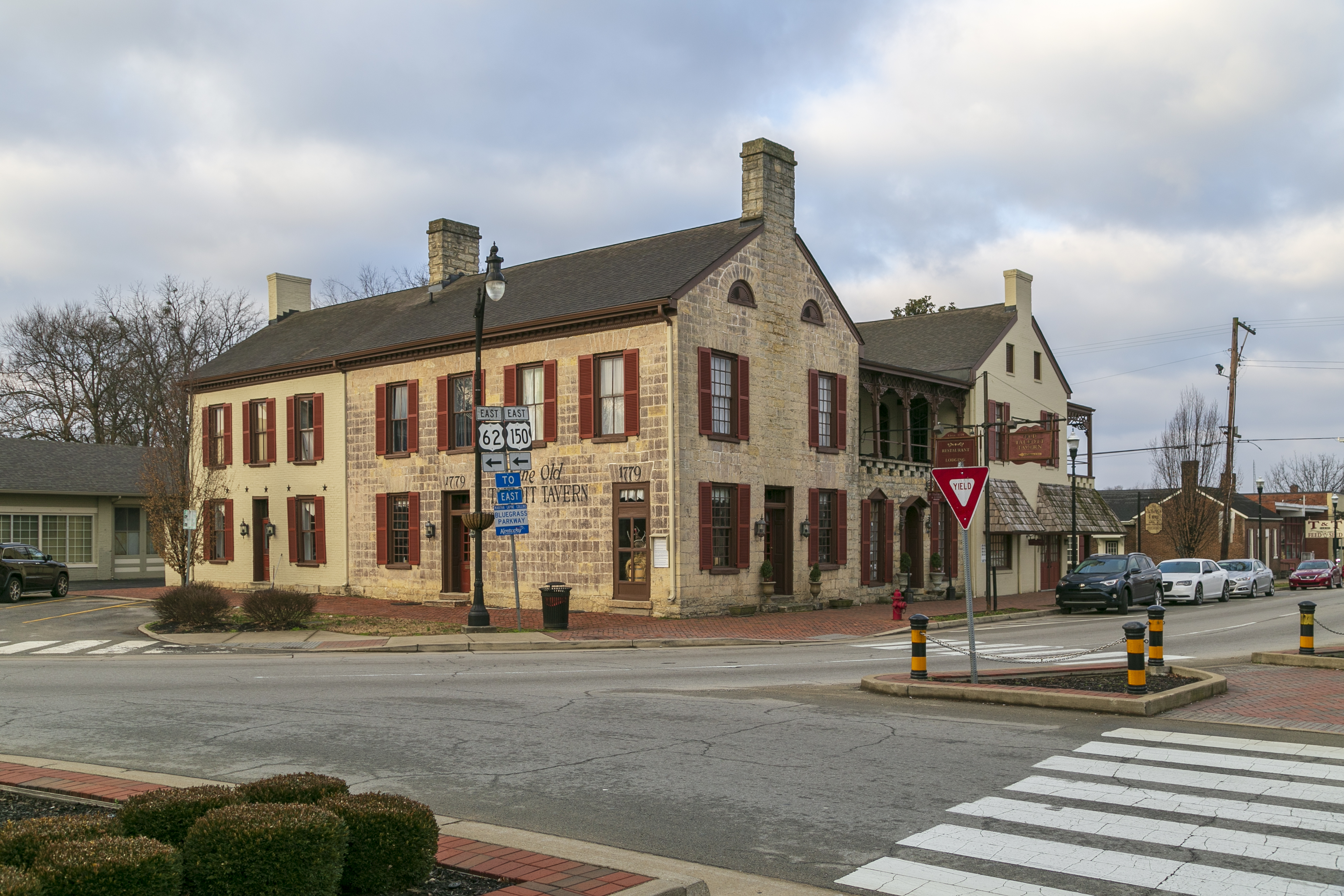
Old Talbott Tavern

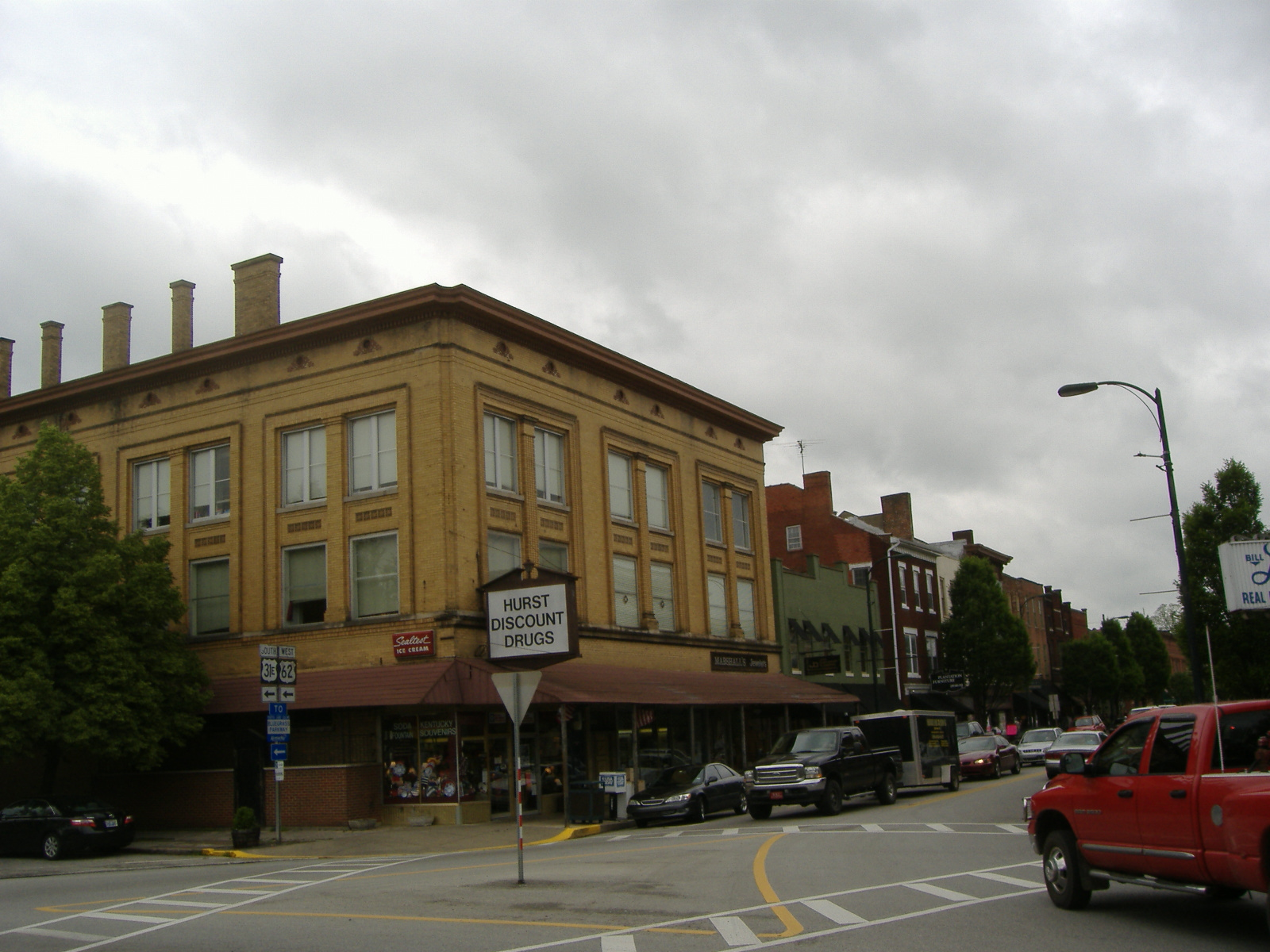
Shops along 3rd Street

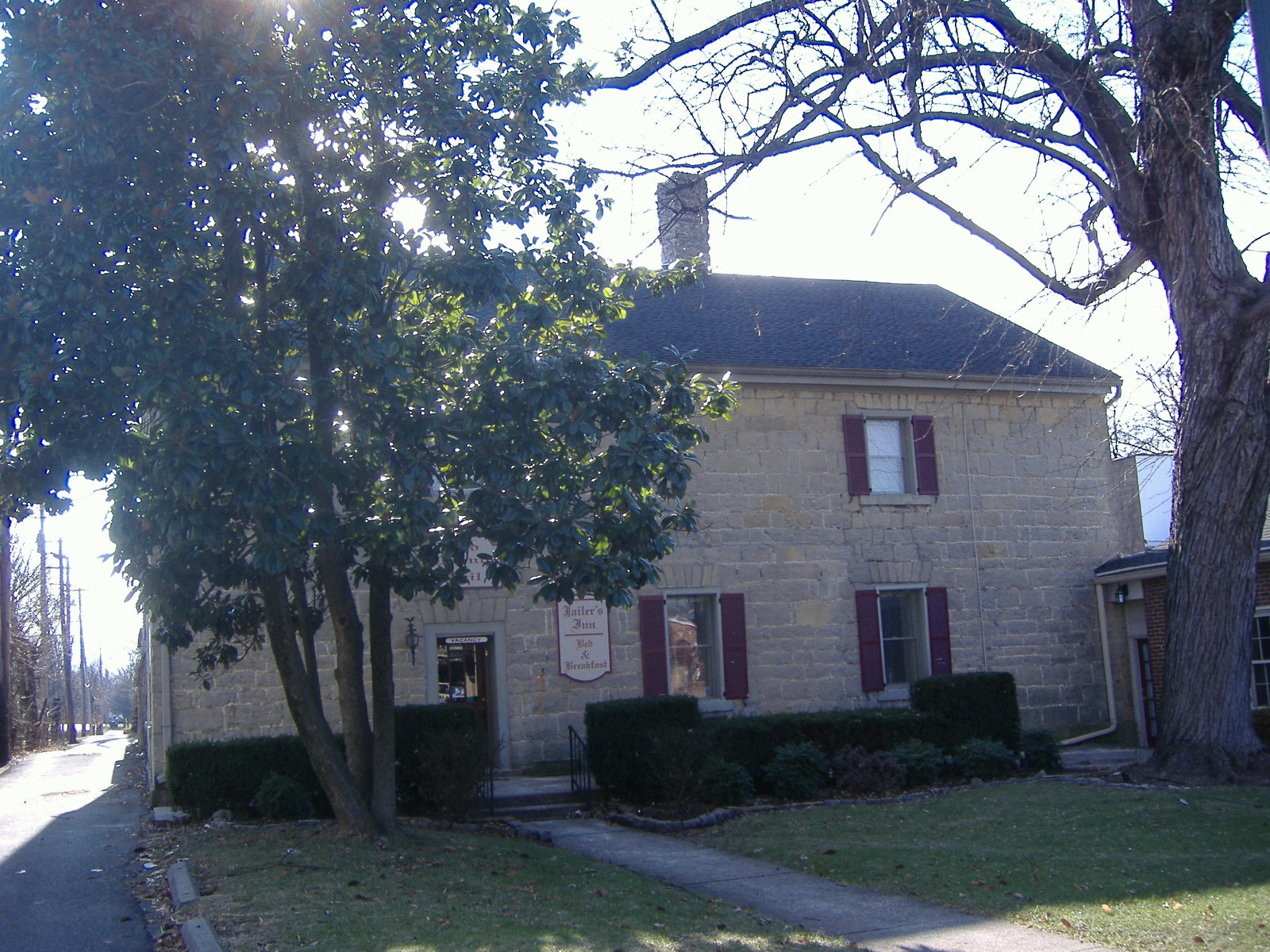
Historic old stone jail

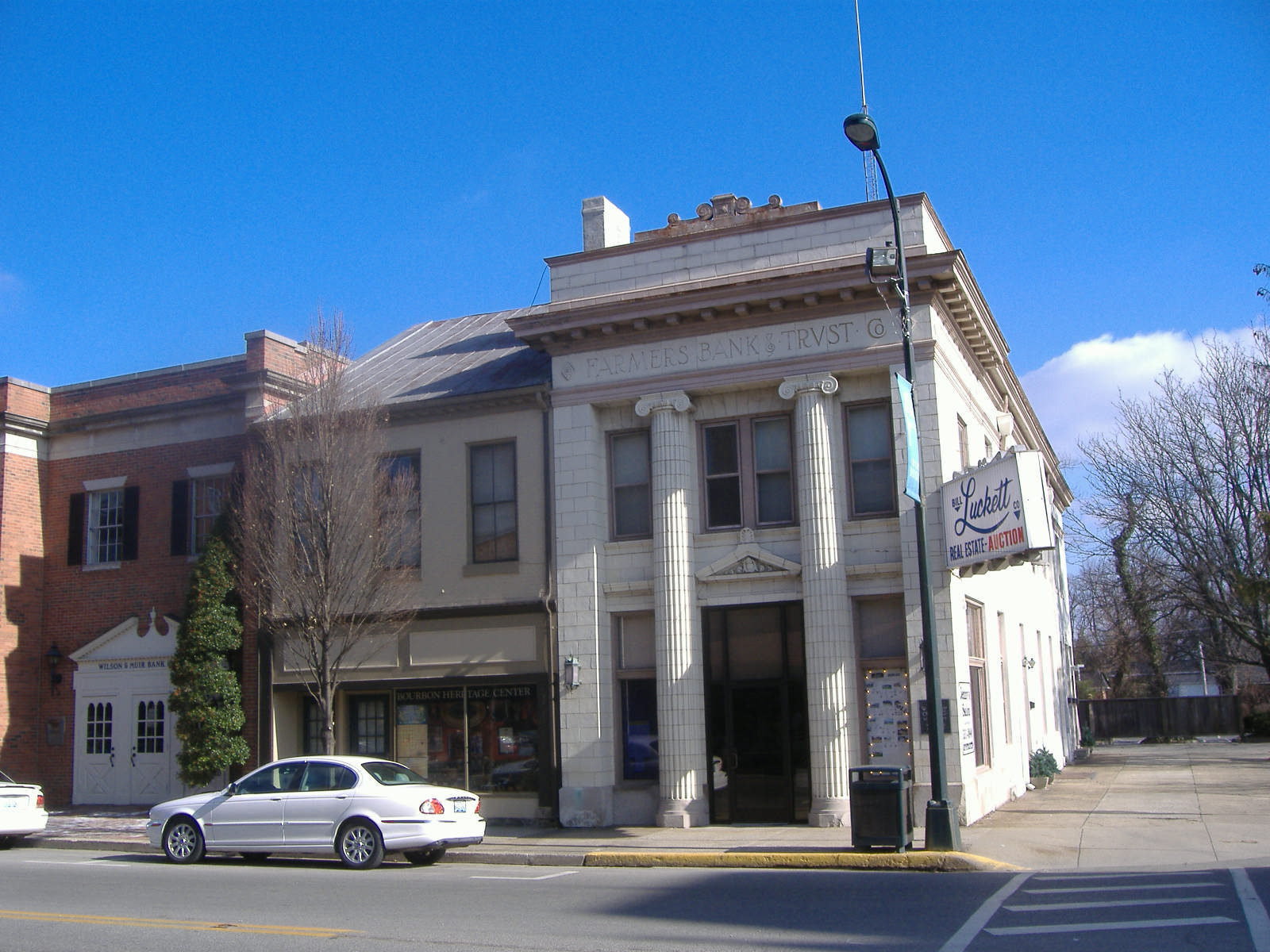
Farmer's Bank & Trust

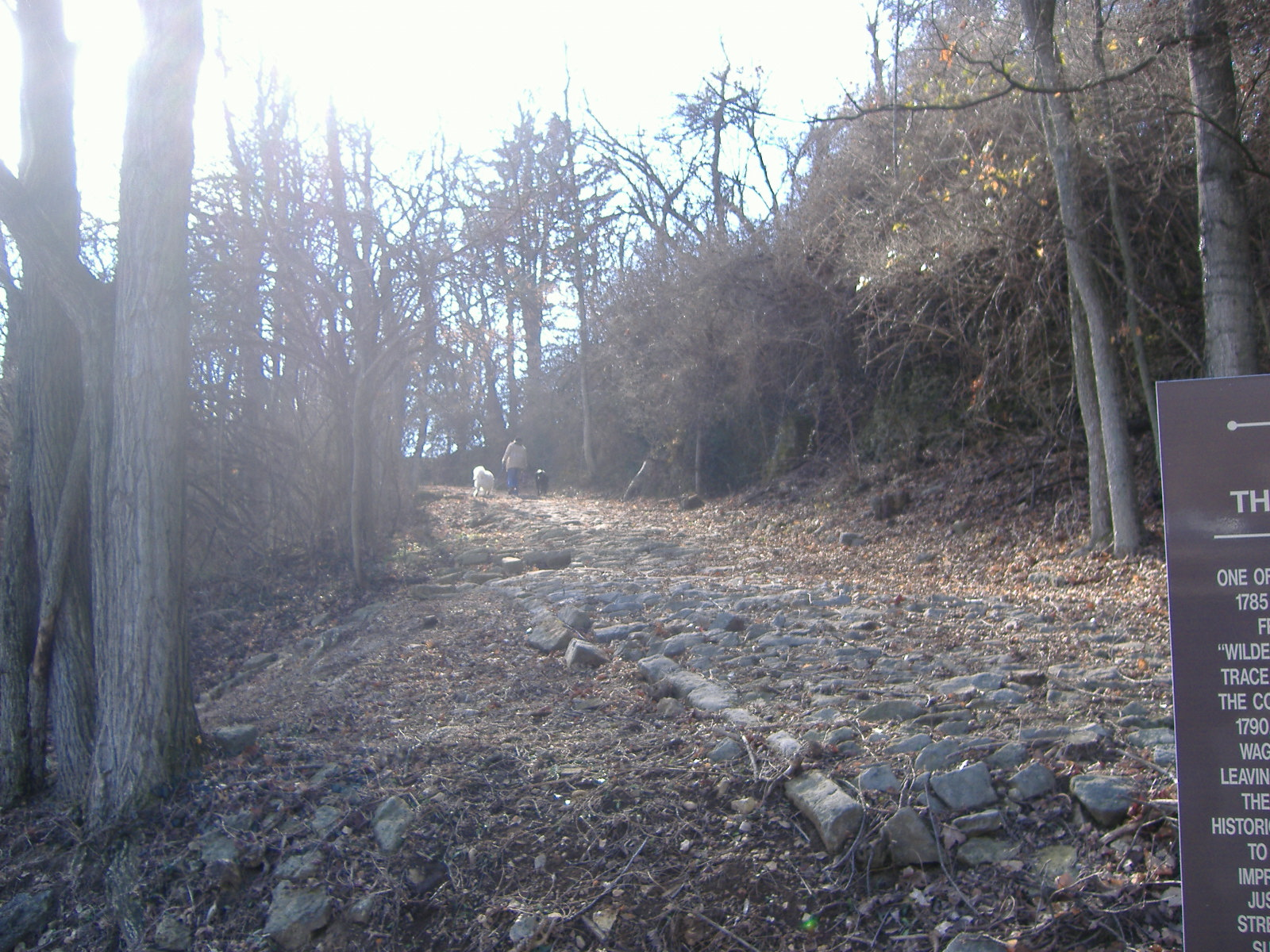
Cobblestone Path

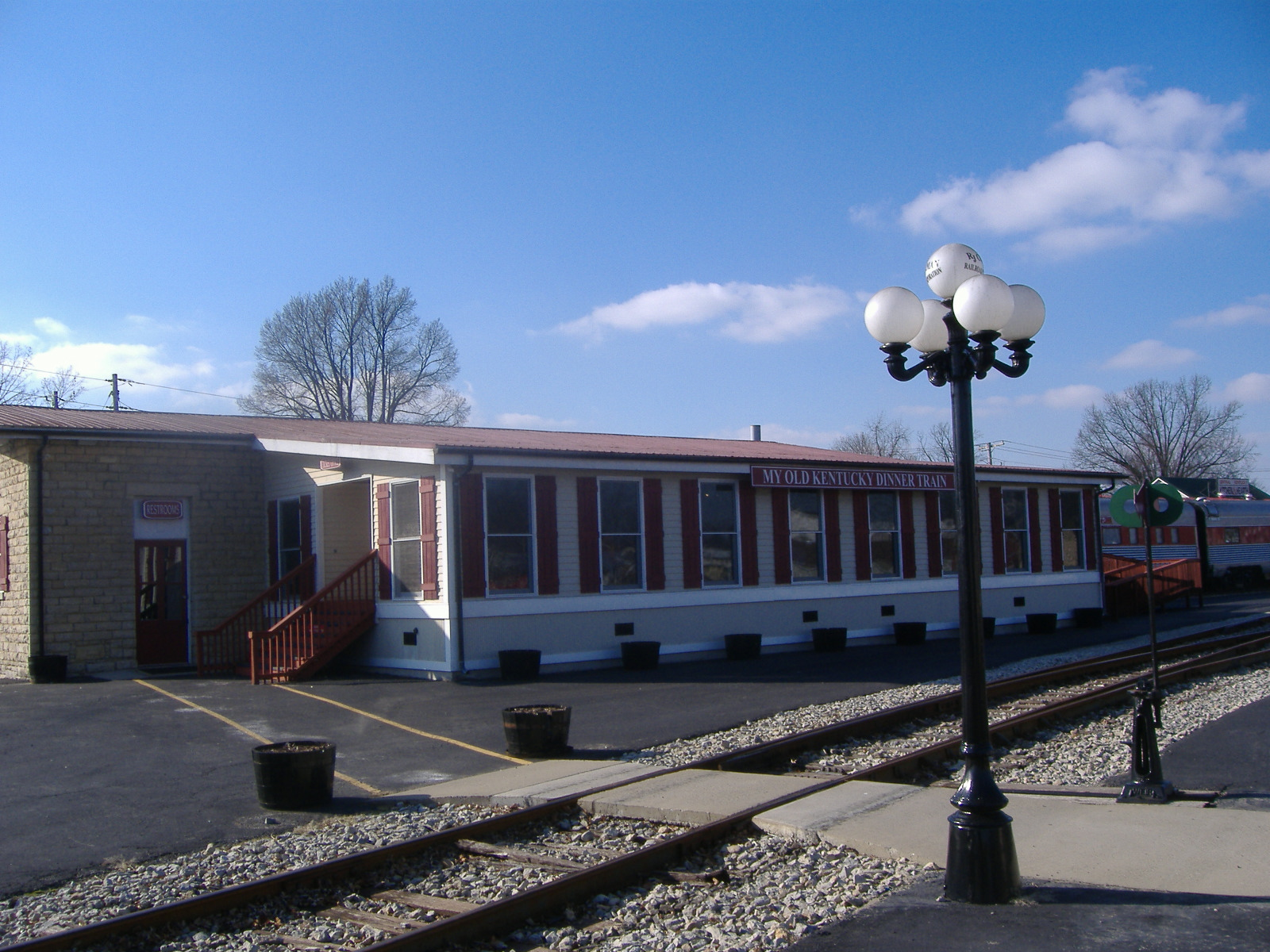
Old L & N Station

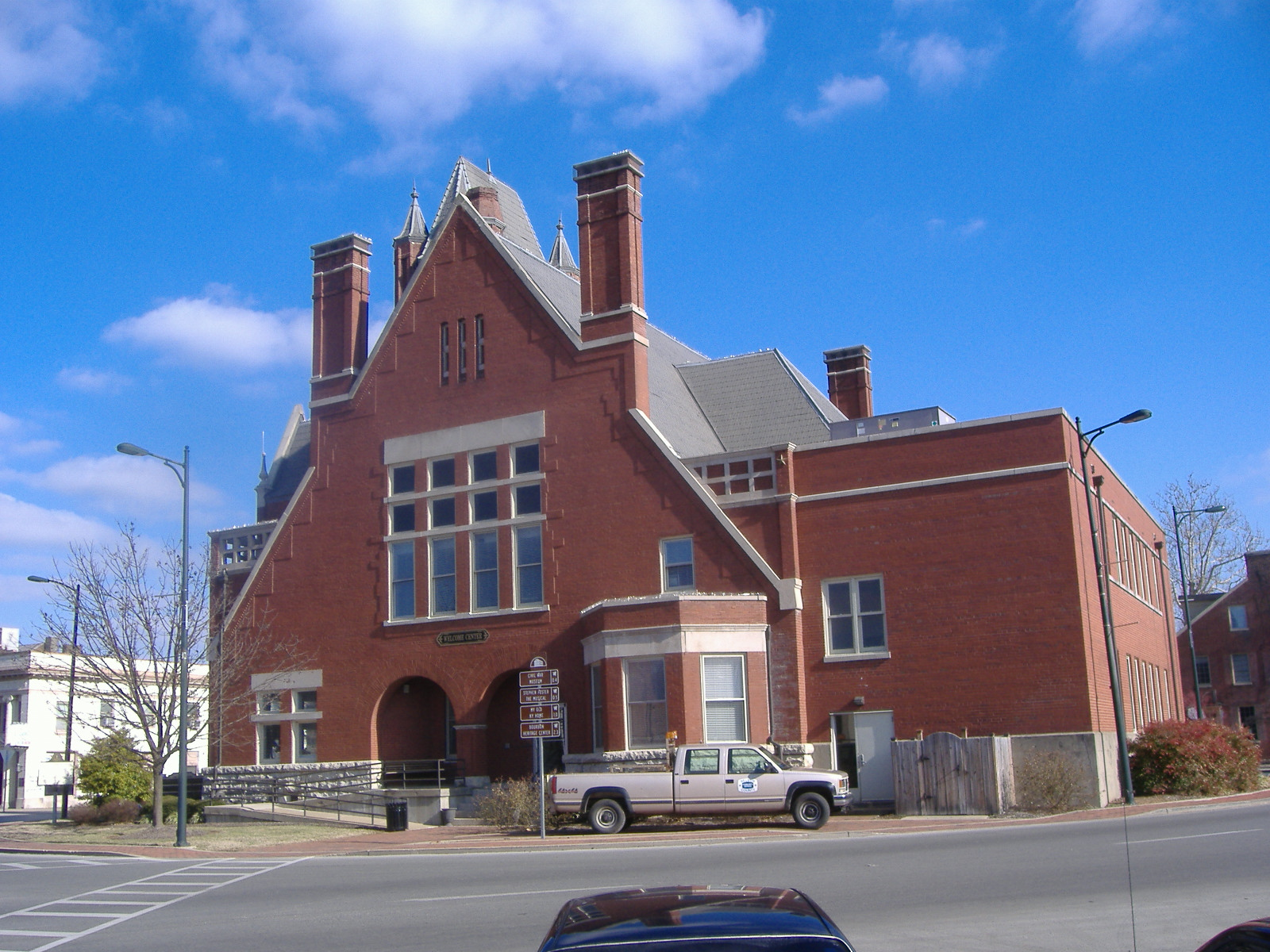
Backview of old Court House
