= My Old Kentucky Home State Park =

State park in Kentucky, United States

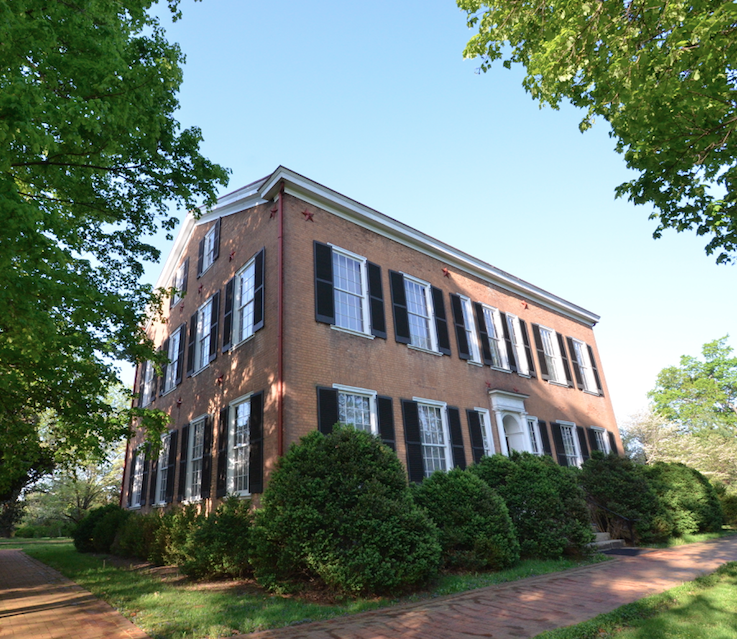
- Federal Hill Mansion

- Location within Kentucky Location within the United States
- Type: Kentucky state park
- Location: Bardstown, Kentucky, United States
- Coordinates: 37°48′23″N 85°27′25″W
- Area: 235 acres (95 ha)
- Elevation: 643 ft (196 m)
- Established: June 19, 1936
- Administrator: Kentucky Department of Parks
- Website: Official website
- My Old Kentucky Home
- U.S. National Register of Historic Places
- Location: Bardstown, Kentucky
- Area: 235 acres (0.95 km^{2})
- Built: 1795
- Architect: John Rowan
- Architectural style: Federal
- NRHP reference No.: 71000354
- Added to NRHP: March 11, 1971

My Old Kentucky Home State Park is a state park located in Bardstown, Kentucky, United States. The park's centerpiece is Federal Hill, a former plantation home owned by United States Senator John Rowan in 1795. During the Rowan family's occupation, the mansion became a meeting place for local politicians and hosted several visiting dignitaries.

The farm is best known for its association with American composer Stephen Foster's sentimental ballad "My Old Kentucky Home, Good Night". Foster was a cousin of the Rowan family and reputedly an occasional visitor to Federal Hill, though Foster was likely inspired to write the ballad by Harriet Beecher Stowe's anti-slavery novel Uncle Tom's Cabin.

After the popularity of the song increased throughout the United States, Federal Hill was purchased by the Commonwealth of Kentucky, dedicated as a historic site, and renamed "My Old Kentucky Home" on July 4, 1923. Foster's song by the same name was made the state song of Kentucky in 1928. The Federal Hill mansion was featured on a U.S. postage stamp in 1992, and it is one of the symbols featured on the reverse of the Kentucky state quarter issued in 2001.

== Federal Hill ==
Federal Hill, commonly known as "My Old Kentucky Home", is a historic 7,501 square feet (696.9 m^{2}) mansion that was planned and commissioned by Judge John Rowan and his wife Ann Lytle. The mansion's original surrounding 1,200 acres were also known as "Federal Hill.” Built in two phases, the rear ell portion of the mansion was constructed in 1795, while the main block, in the form of a five-bay, three-story mansion was completed in 1818, using slave labor. With Rowan in residence, Federal Hill was a local power center in the realms of legal, political, and social events. Prominent visitors to the home included Marquis de Lafayette, Andrew Jackson, and Henry Clay. According to Stephen Foster's brother Morrison Foster, Stephen was an occasional visitor to Federal Hill. Stephen's sister Charlotte visited Federal Hill, where her cousin Atkinson Hill Rowan unsuccessfully proposed to Charlotte. Judge Rowan occupied a Louisville residence during the majority of his later years and was rarely in residence at Federal Hill near the end of his life.

In 1839, the house suffered fire damage to the third story and roof. Carpenter Alexander Moore was hired to repair the damage, as he had worked on the design elements and woodwork in 1818. John Rowan Jr. occupied Federal Hill after the death of his father. When John Jr. died in 1855, his widow, Rebecca Carnes Rowan, occupied Federal Hill until 1897. The house then passed to their daughter, Madge (Rowan) Frost.

In 1922, the "My Old Kentucky Home Commission" purchased Federal Hill from Madge Rowan Frost, the last heir of Federal Hill farm. The Commission renovated the property and gave the farm to the Commonwealth of Kentucky for use as a state park, with the official dedication on July 4, 1923.

=== Architecture ===
Federal Hill is designed in the Federal Style that was popular at the beginning of the 19th century. The mansion is constructed on a native limestone foundation that supports an English basement and two and a half stories, with an exterior primarily of brick that were fired on-site and laid in the Flemish bond pattern. The interior of the mansion has a center-hall floorplan, ceilings of 13 feet (4.0 m) and ash wood flooring throughout. The principal rooms of the house are located on the ground floor and consists of the dining room, parlor, and library, while the second floor has three bedrooms similarly spaced to the rooms below. All the rooms feature mantels and windowsills that were finely carved by a free black craftsman.

Auxiliary farm buildings associated with the mansion include the original springhouse. To the rear of the home the oldest section of residence can be seen. The ell consists of four rooms as well as the kitchen and smokehouse. The smokehouse was built as part of the existing structure, and not free-standing as is most often seen. The rear ell structure served as the first residence for the family while the primary residence was constructed. To the east of the house is the family burial ground. Behind the house is a modern flower garden. A burial ground of enslaved men, women, and children is located to the southwest of the mansion, adjacent to the site of the property's "sugar camp.". Documented but no longer existing buildings include multiple slave houses, a large stable due-west of the mansion, an ash house, and garden house.

== State park ==
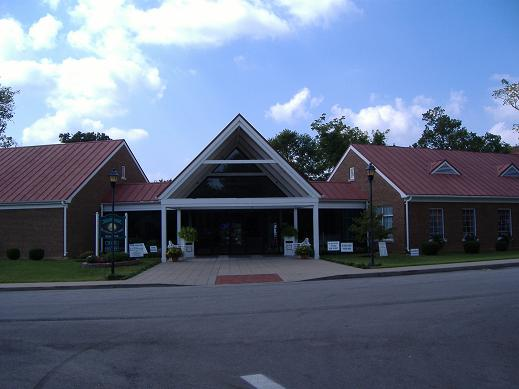
Visitor Center

The property was originally a State Historic Site, but it was passed to the Division of State Parks in 1936 with intentions to increase the amount of activities surrounding the historic mansion. Today, the tour focuses on the career of Stephen Foster, the life of enslaved people at Federal Hill, Kentucky traditions, and information regarding 19th century daily life on a Kentucky farm. 85% of the furniture exhibited inside the mansion was owned by the Rowan family. The Judge Rowan family coin silver is also exhibited there.

The mansion was renovated in 1977, and again in 2006. The 2006 renovation was funded by an anonymous donor. New floor coverings, elaborate wallpapers, and period window treatments were used to interpret the mansion to the period in which John Rowan Jr. occupied the mansion. The use of family letters, photos from the 1920s, and 1950s, assisted in the renovation. The 2006 renovation cost nearly $1 million. Tour guides dress in period costumes and as of 2015, the tour has been altered to include the singing of "My Old Kentucky Home" by tour guides, many of whom also play in The Stephen Foster Story, a musical that typically is performed daily at the park from May until August of every year. Throughout the year, various events are held at My Old Kentucky Home State Park. Special Christmas candlelight tours are offered during the holiday season each year in which the mansion is decorated for the holiday and is lit by candlelight.

A new visitors center was added to the park in the 1990s, and houses a conference and wedding space, a giftshop, and kitchen. The gift shop contains Items concerning the park and the state of Kentucky, especially books by Kentucky authors and Kentucky Derby items. The park also features the Kenny Rapier Golf Course, a regulation 18-hole golf course named for a previous Kentucky Commissioner of Parks and Bardstown native, that also features a fully equipped pro shop. The 39-site campground is available mid-March to mid-November.

== State quarter ==
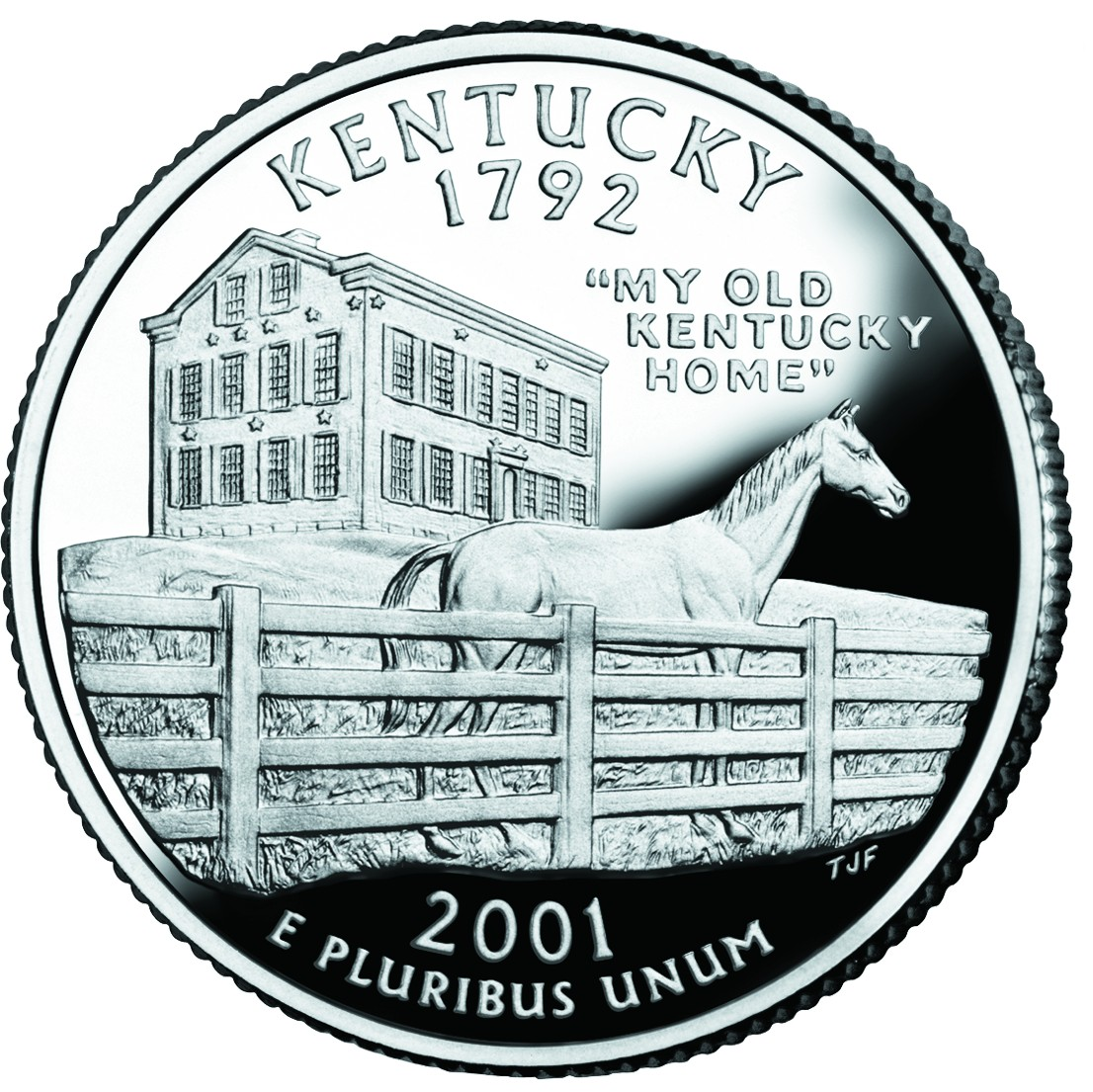
The reverse side of the Kentucky State Quarter

On June 1, 1992, a 29-cent stamp was issued honoring the park. The Federal Hill mansion was also chosen to be one of the icons featured on the Kentucky State Quarter. To the right of the stately mansion, an inscription on the coin reads "My Old Kentucky Home". It was the 15th state quarter, released on October 18, 2001, denoting the fact that Kentucky was the 15th state to join the United States. The official ceremony revealing the quarter was held in the park, and was said by then-governor Paul E. Patton that the mansion and the accompanying thoroughbred were: "...the two most visible, beloved symbols in Kentucky".

== The Stephen Foster Story and other outdoor productions ==
The park features an amphitheater that is home to the long-running outdoor musical, The Stephen Foster Story, which is staged during the summer. It is the longest running outdoor drama in the state of Kentucky, having started in 1959. It was written by playwright Paul Green. Matinees are performed in an indoor theater with air conditioning. Many Foster songs are performed, with the actors dancing in antebellum period costume, in a retelling of Foster's life.

Recently, the amphitheater has incorporated new musicals into its performance schedule, in addition to The Stephen Foster Story. In 2008, the amphitheater produced The Civil War in celebration of the Lincoln Bicentennial. In 2009, a second musical, Joseph and the Amazing Technicolor Dreamcoat, was staged. Other musicals have included The Wizard of Oz, and All Shook Up. In addition, the amphitheater hosts a summer concert series.

== See also ==
- List of attractions and events in the Louisville metropolitan area
- National Register of Historic Places listings in Nelson County, Kentucky
