= Bardstown, Kentucky =

- City
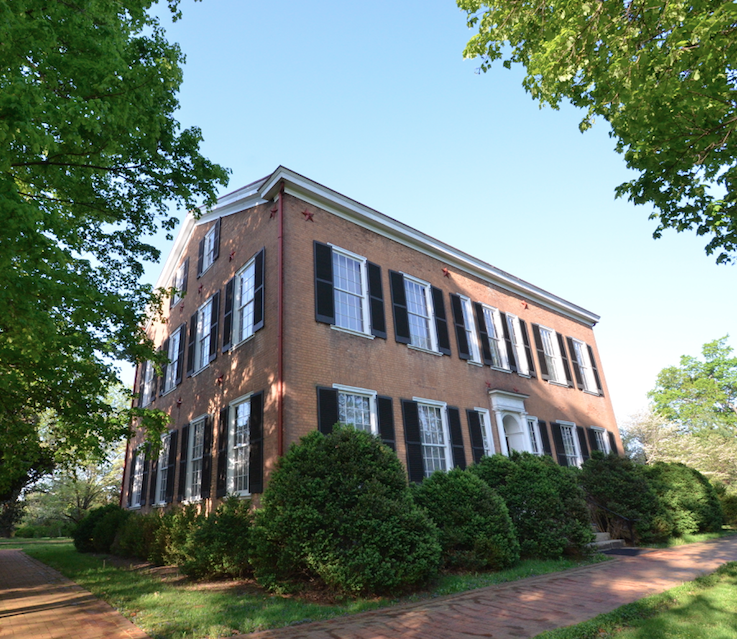
- My Old Kentucky Home in Bardstown
- Nickname: Bourbon Capital of the World
- Location of Bardstown in Nelson County, Kentucky.

- Location in Kentucky Bardstown (the United States) Bardstown (North America)
- Coordinates: 37°49′03″N 85°27′18″W
- Country: United States
- State: Kentucky
- County: Nelson
- Settled: Salem, 1770s
- Established: Bard's Town, 1780
- Incorporated: Bardstown, 1790

Government
  - Mayor: J. Richard Heaton

Area
  - Total: 12.19 sq mi (31.57 km^{2})
  - Land: 12.11 sq mi (31.36 km^{2})
  - Water: 0.081 sq mi (0.21 km^{2})
- Elevation: 659 ft (201 m)

Population (2020)
  - Total: 13,567
  - Estimate (2022): 13,739
  - Density: 1,120.6/sq mi (432.67/km^{2})
- Time zone: UTC-5 (EST)
  - Summer (DST): UTC-4 (EDT)
- ZIP Code: 40004
- Area code: 502
- FIPS code: 21-03628
- GNIS feature ID: 2403156
- Website: cityofbardstown.org

Bardstown is a home rule-class city in Nelson County, Kentucky, United States. The population was 13,567 in the 2020 census. It is the county seat of Nelson County.

Bardstown is named for the pioneering Bard brothers. David Bard obtained a 1,000-acre (400 ha) land grant in 1785 in what was then Jefferson County, Virginia. William Bard surveyed and platted the town. It was originally chartered as Baird's Town in 1788, and has been known as Beardstown, and Beards Town. The production of bourbon whiskey is a major industry.

== History ==
First settled in 1780, Bardstown is among the oldest cities in Kentucky. That year, the Old Talbott Tavern was built, a year before the settlement of Salem (later renamed Bardstown) began, making it the "oldest western stagecoach stop" still in operation. Named county seat of the newly created Nelson County, Virginia (now Kentucky) in 1784, the town was formally established in 1788. It was incorporated by the state assembly in 1838.

Reflecting the westward migration of Americans over the Blue Ridge Mountains after the Revolutionary War, Bardstown was also the first center of Catholicism west of the Appalachian Mountains in the original western frontier territories of the United States. The Diocese of Bardstown was established on February 8, 1808, to serve all Catholics between the Appalachians and the Mississippi River. This divided the previous all-encompassing Diocese of Baltimore, established in 1789. In 1841, the seat of the diocese was transferred to nearby Louisville, Kentucky. The Bardstown cathedral is the Basilica of Saint Joseph Proto-Cathedral, and the city has a Roman Catholic parochial high school, Bethlehem High School.

== Geography ==
Bardstown is located in north central Nelson County. It is at the intersection of U.S. Routes 31E, 62 and 150. The Bluegrass Parkway passes to the southeast.

According to the United States Census Bureau, the city has a total area of 7.4 square miles (19.2 km^{2}), all but 0.1 square miles (0.3 km^{2}) of which is land.

=== Climate ===
The climate in this area is characterized by hot, humid summers and generally mild to cool winters. According to the Köppen Climate Classification system, Bardstown has a humid subtropical climate, abbreviated "Cfa" on climate maps.

Climate data for Bardstown, Kentucky (1991–2020 averages)
Month	Jan	Feb	Mar	Apr	May	Jun	Jul	Aug	Sep	Oct	Nov	Dec	Year
Record high °F (°C)	73 (23)	81 (27)	91 (33)	94 (34)	102 (39)	105 (41)	112 (44)	109 (43)	106 (41)	97 (36)	85 (29)	78 (26)	112 (44)
Mean daily maximum °F (°C)	43.3 (6.3)	48.1 (8.9)	57.4 (14.1)	68.7 (20.4)	76.5 (24.7)	83.6 (28.7)	86.6 (30.3)	86.2 (30.1)	80.7 (27.1)	69.5 (20.8)	56.6 (13.7)	46.5 (8.1)	67.2 (19.6)
Mean daily minimum °F (°C)	26.1 (−3.3)	29.1 (−1.6)	36.5 (2.5)	46.0 (7.8)	55.4 (13.0)	62.9 (17.2)	66.3 (19.1)	64.5 (18.1)	58.0 (14.4)	47.1 (8.4)	37.2 (2.9)	30.1 (−1.1)	33.7 (0.9)
Record low °F (°C)	−26 (−32)	−25 (−32)	−8 (−22)	19 (−7)	27 (−3)	37 (3)	45 (7)	43 (6)	27 (−3)	16 (−9)	−5 (−21)	−20 (−29)	−26 (−32)
Average precipitation inches (mm)	3.71 (94)	3.86 (98)	4.92 (125)	4.71 (120)	5.46 (139)	4.9 (120)	4.5 (110)	3.65 (93)	3.90 (99)	3.71 (94)	3.70 (94)	4.51 (115)	51.61 (1,311)
Average snowfall inches (cm)	4.20 (10.7)	3.70 (9.4)	1.3 (3.3)	0.00 (0.00)	0.00 (0.00)	0.00 (0.00)	0.00 (0.00)	0.00 (0.00)	0.00 (0.00)	0.00 (0.00)	0.20 (0.51)	2.50 (6.4)	11.9 (30)
Source: NOAA

== Demographics ==
Historical population
Census	Pop.	Note	%±
1790	216		—
1800	579		168.1%
1810	821		41.8%
1830	1,629		—
1840	1,492		−8.4%
1860	1,536		—
1870	1,835		19.5%
1880	926		−49.5%
1890	1,524		64.6%
1900	1,711		12.3%
1910	2,126		24.3%
1920	1,717		−19.2%
1930	1,767		2.9%
1940	3,152		78.4%
1950	4,154		31.8%
1960	4,798		15.5%
1970	5,816		21.2%
1980	6,155		5.8%
1990	6,801		10.5%
2000	10,374		52.5%
2010	11,700		12.8%
2020	13,567		16.0%
2024 (est.)	14,104		4.0%

=== 2020 census ===
As of the 2020 census, Bardstown had a population of 13,567. The median age was 37.1 years. 24.9% of residents were under the age of 18 and 16.1% of residents were 65 years of age or older. For every 100 females there were 89.5 males, and for every 100 females age 18 and over there were 86.3 males age 18 and over.

96.7% of residents lived in urban areas, while 3.3% lived in rural areas.

There were 5,572 households in Bardstown, of which 32.7% had children under the age of 18 living in them. Of all households, 36.8% were married-couple households, 18.7% were households with a male householder and no spouse or partner present, and 34.7% were households with a female householder and no spouse or partner present. About 32.3% of all households were made up of individuals and 12.8% had someone living alone who was 65 years of age or older.

There were 5,995 housing units, of which 7.1% were vacant. The homeowner vacancy rate was 1.8% and the rental vacancy rate was 5.9%.

Racial composition as of the 2020 census
Race	Number	Percent
White	10,698	78.9%
Black or African American	1,614	11.9%
American Indian and Alaska Native	32	0.2%
Asian	104	0.8%
Native Hawaiian and Other Pacific Islander	2	0.0%
Some other race	237	1.7%
Two or more races	880	6.5%
Hispanic or Latino (of any race)	571	4.2%

=== 2010 census ===
As of the census of 2010, there were 11,700 people, 4,712 households, and 2,949 families living in the city. The population density was 1,577.9 per square mile (609.2/km^{2}). There were 5,113 housing units at an average density of 689.5 per square mile (266.2/km^{2}). The racial makeup of the city was 82.31% White (80.79% non-Hispanic), 12.39% African American, 0.21% Native American, 0.75% Asian, 0.01% Pacific Islander, 1.56% from other races, and 2.78% from two or more races. Hispanics or Latinos of any race were 3.71% of the population.

There were 4,712 households, out of which 32.9% had children under the age of 18 living with them, 37.3% were married couples living together, 19.5% had a female householder with no husband present, 5.9% had a male householder with no wife present, and 37.4% were non-families. 31.5% of all households were made up of individuals, and 9.7% had someone living alone who was 65 years of age or older. The average household size was 2.42 and the average family size was 3.01.

The age distribution was 27.7% under 18, 8.8% from 18 to 24, 27.1% from 25 to 44, 24.2% from 45 to 64, and 12.2% who were 65 or older. The median age was 34.0 years. For every 100 females, there were 88.3 males. For every 100 females age 18 and over, there were 83.3 males.

As of the 2010 Census, the median income for a household in the city was $50,046, and the median income for a family was $60,609. Full-time male workers had a median income of $46,500 versus $36,551 for females. The per capita income for the city was $26,059. About 11.3% of families and 15.3% of the population were below the poverty line, including 21.6% of those under age 18 and 9.0% of those age 65 or over.

=== 2000 census ===
As of the census of 2000, there were 10,374 people, 4,195 households, and 2,701 families living in the city. The population density was 1,445.3 per square mile (558.0/km^{2}). There were 4,488 housing units at an average density of 625.3 per square mile (241.4/km^{2}). The racial makeup of the city was 82.11% White, 15.07% African American, 0.13% Native American, 0.94% Asian, 0.01% Pacific Islander, 0.67% from other races, and 1.07% from two or more races. Hispanic and Latino of any race were 1.38% of the population.

There were 4,195 households, out of which 34.6% had children under the age of 18 living with them, 42.7% were married couples living together, 17.6% had a female householder with no husband present, and 35.6% were non-families. 31.2% of all households were made up of individuals, and 10.9% had someone living alone who was 65 years of age or older. The average household size was 2.40 and the average family size was 3.00.

In the city, the population was spread out, with 27.7% under 18, 9.8% from 18 to 24, 29.8% from 25 to 44, 19.7% from 45 to 64, and 12.9% who were 65 or older. The median age was 33 years. For every 100 females, there were 87.8 males. For every 100 females age 18 and over, there were 83.6 males.

The median income for a household in the city was $31,497, and the median income for a family was $41,065. Males had a median income of $31,850 versus $20,537 for females. The per capita income for the city was $17,681. About 14.6% of families and 17.7% of the population were below the poverty line, including 25.6% of those under age 18 and 15.8% of those age 65 or over.

== Arts and culture ==
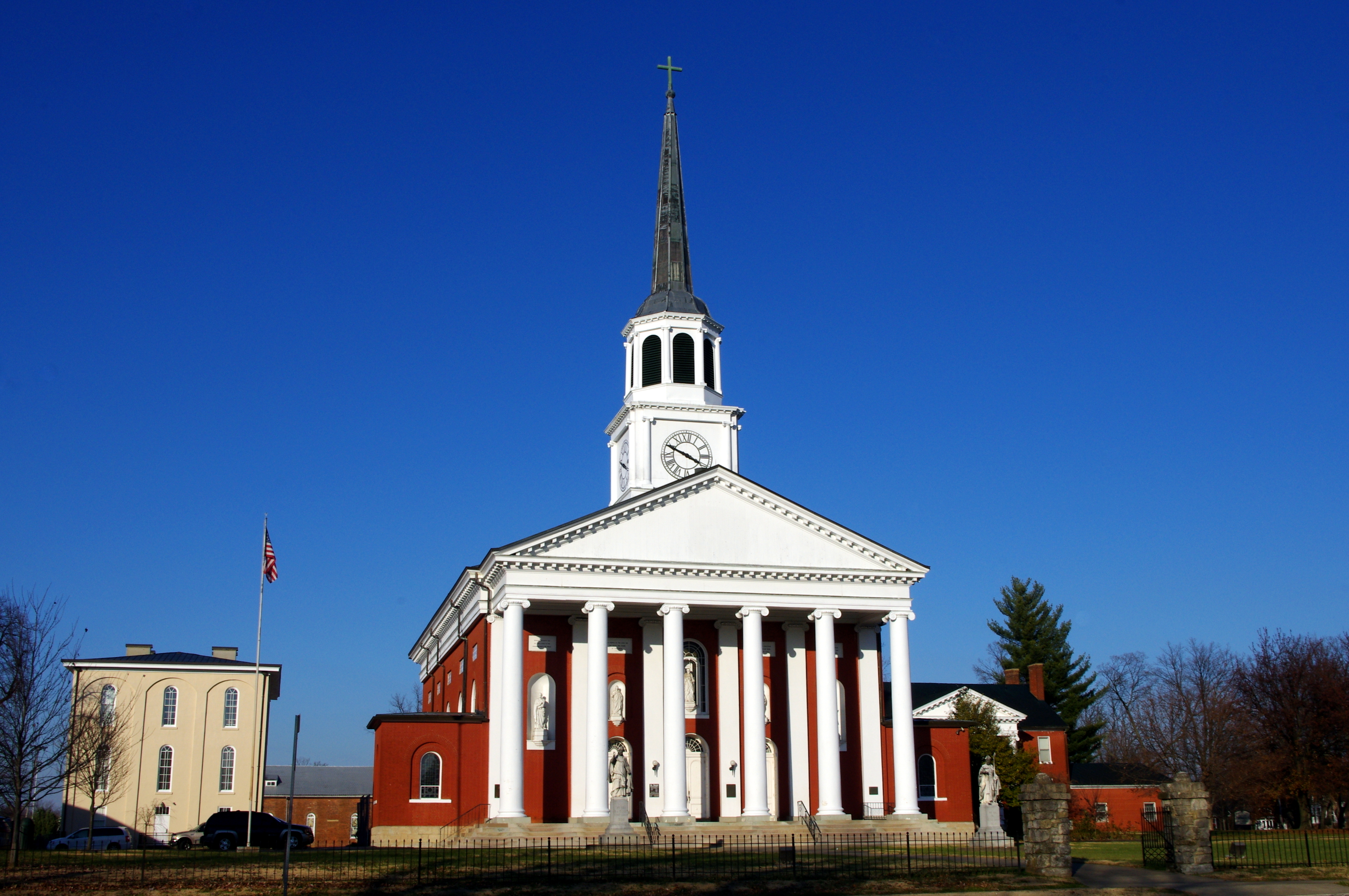
Basilica of St. Joseph Proto-Cathedral in Bardstown

The Old Talbott Tavern, built in 1779, has been patronized by frontiersman Daniel Boone, and future 16th President Abraham Lincoln. Bullet holes in an upstairs wall are reputed to have been shot by Jesse James. It had been rumored that the Tavern is haunted.

Distilleries operating in Bardstown include Heaven Hill, Barton 1792, Willett, and Lux Row Distillers. The regional production of bourbon is celebrated at the annual Kentucky Bourbon Festival, whose promoters have trademarked the phrase "Bourbon Capital of the World" to apply exclusively to Bardstown. The festival was designated Kentucky's official bourbon festival by the Kentucky General Assembly in 2000.

The Civil War Museum in Bardstown is the fourth-largest Civil War museum in the United States.

Other notable sites include:

- Bardstown Historic District, listed on the National Register of Historic Places.
- Bardstown Historical Museum.
- Oscar Getz Museum of Whiskey, which celebrates Bardstown's history in the production of whiskey.
- Wickland, a private residence that has been the home of three governors (two of Kentucky and one of Louisiana) and is open to the public for tours.
- A memorial to steamboat inventor John Fitch in Courthouse Square, including a replica of his first steamboat.
- Anatok, a now-demolished slave plantation built by Charles Haydon; also the birthplace of Daniel Rudd.

Bardstown has a lending library, a branch of the Nelson County Public Library.

== Parks and recreation ==
My Old Kentucky Home State Park is located in Bardstown. Judge John Rowan and his wife Ann Lytle Rowan commissioned the construction of a large mansion there named Federal Hill. The Stephen Foster Story is an outdoor musical at the park about Stephen Foster, composer of "My Old Kentucky Home." It was designated Kentucky's official outdoor musical by the Kentucky General Assembly in 2002.

== Education ==
Almost all of the city is served by the Bardstown City Schools; the district also includes significant portions of the built-up area outside the city limits. Ryan Clark is the Superintendent of Schools.

The school district includes an Early Childhood Education Center, Primary School, Elementary School, Middle School and High School.

Some of the city is instead served by the surrounding Nelson County School District. By contrast, one of the county district's two high schools, Nelson County High, physically lies within the Bardstown school district.

Bardstown is also home to St. Joseph School and Bethlehem High School, both of which have been operational since 1819. Both schools are under the jurisdiction of the Roman Catholic Archdiocese of Louisville.

== Media ==
The Kentucky Standard is a newspaper in Bardstown.

In early 2023, Bardstown was ranked as number 8 of Travel and Leisure 20 Most Beautiful Small Towns in America. Mentioned were the Federal and Georgian architecture, cobblestone paths, and gateway to Kentucky Bourbon Trail.

== Infrastructure ==
=== Transportation ===
The Bluegrass Parkway is a limited-access highway that passes just south of Bardstown. A part of the Kentucky parkway system, the highway was formerly a toll road. Tolls were removed in 1991 after its construction bonds had been paid off.

Railroad freight service is provided by the R.J. Corman Railroad Central Kentucky Lines, over the former Bardstown Branch of the Louisville and Nashville Railroad.

== Notable people ==
- J. C. W. Beckham, grandson of Charles A. Wickliffe, U.S. Senator from Kentucky, 35th Governor of Kentucky, born in Wickland
- Francis Ridgley Cotton, first bishop of the Diocese of Owensboro
- William Pope Duval, first civilian governor of the Florida Territory
- Ephraim H. Foster, U.S. Senator from Tennessee
- Lucy Ann Kidd-Key, president of North Texas Female College (later Kidd-Key College)
- Candy Massaroni, Kentucky state representative
- Marie Mattingly Meloney, journalist
- Hal Moore, retired U.S. Army lieutenant general, co-author of We Were Soldiers Once… And Young
- Daniel Arthur Rudd, early civil rights activist, Black Catholic journalist
- Jessie Belle Smothers, pro wrestler
- Leroy Augustus Stafford, Confederate brigadier general, educated in Bardstown
- Charles A. Wickliffe, 14th Governor of Kentucky, United States Postmaster General, built and resided in Wickland
- Robert C. Wickliffe, son of Charles A. Wickliffe, Lieutenant Governor and 15th Governor of Louisiana, born in Wickland

== See also ==
- Bardstown Historic District
- Disappearance of Crystal Rogers
- Abbey of Our Lady of Gethsemani
