= List of museums in the Louisville metropolitan area =

This is a list of museums, galleries and interpretive centers in the Louisville metropolitan area.

== Art ==
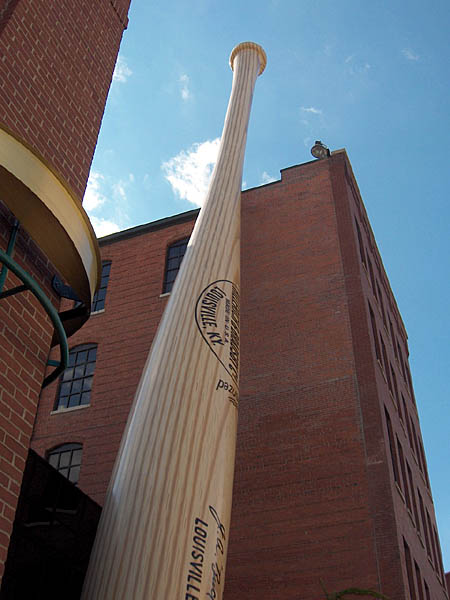
A giant baseball bat adorns the outside of Louisville Slugger Museum & Factory in downtown Louisville.

- 21c Museum Hotel
- Carnegie Center for Art & History (New Albany, Indiana)
- KMAC Museum
- Speed Art Museum

== Regional history ==
- Falls of the Ohio State Park interpretive center, a museum covering the natural history related to findings in the nearby exposed Devonian fossil beds as well as the human history of the Louisville area
- The Filson Historical Society, features a museum and extensive historical collections, currently undergoing major expansion
- Frazier History Museum
- Historic Locust Grove Visitors Center, which includes a museum
- Howard Steamboat Museum (Jeffersonville, Indiana)
- Kentucky Derby Museum
- Kentucky Railway Museum (New Haven)
- Louisville Slugger Museum & Factory
- My Old Kentucky Home State Park (Bardstown)
- Portland Museum
- Riverside, The Farnsley-Moremen Landing Visitors Center, which includes a museum
- Thomas Edison House
- Whitney Young Birthplace and Museum

=== Bourbon ===
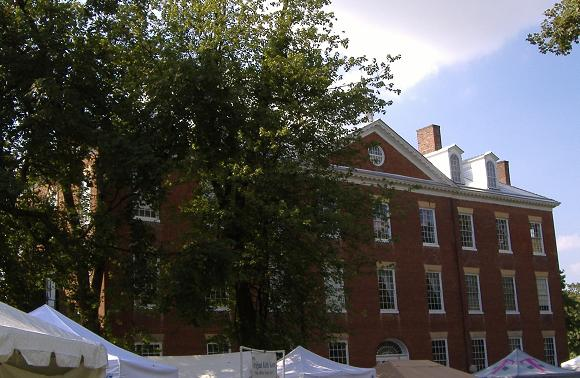
Spalding Hall in Bardstown, which houses both the Bardstown Historical Museum and the Oscar Getz Museum of Whiskey History

- Evan Williams Bourbon Experience, located on Louisville's Whiskey Row, featuring bourbon history and tastings, and interprets Louisville's wharf history in the 1790s
- Heaven Hill Distilleries Bourbon Heritage Center (Bardstown)
- Jim Beam American Stillhouse (Clermont)
- Oscar Getz Museum of Whiskey History (Bardstown)
- Stitzel-Weller Distillery (Shively)

=== Cities ===
- Bardstown Historical Museum (Bardstown)
- Corydon Capitol State Historic Site (Corydon, Indiana)
- Historic Middletown Museum
- Jeffersontown Historical Museum (Jeffersontown)

=== Counties ===
- The Bullitt County History Museum (Shepherdsville)
- Clark County Museum (Jeffersonville, Indiana)
- Henry County Historical Society (New Castle)
- Oldham County History Center (La Grange)

More regional historical collections can be found at the Louisville Free Public Library and the University of Louisville.

== U.S. and world history ==
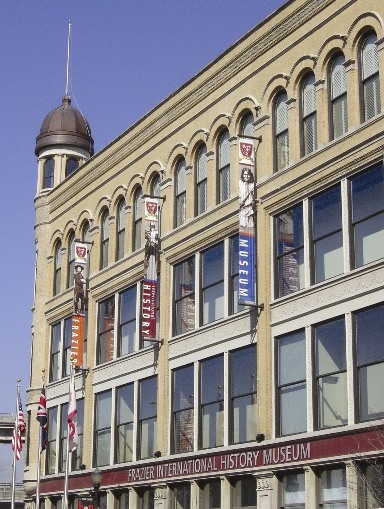
Front facade of the Frazier History Museum

- Museum of the American Printing House for the Blind
- Civil War Museum (Bardstown), including the Civil War Museum of the Western Theater, Pioneer Village, Women's Civil War Museum, War Memorial of Mid America and the Wildlife Museum
- John Hay Center
- Louisville Slugger Museum & Factory, showcases the history of the Louisville Slugger and baseball in general
- General George Patton Museum of Leadership (Fort Knox)
- SAR Education Center and Museum (opening in 2027), features a historical museum, education center, library, and a genealogical collection by the National Society of the Sons of the American Revolution

== Other subjects ==
- Kentucky Science Center, hands-on science museum featuring a four-story digital theater
- Louisville WaterWorks Museum, located at the Louisville Water Tower
- Muhammad Ali Center
- Schimpff's Candy Museum (Jeffersonville)
- Thomas Merton Center

== See also ==
- List of attractions and events in the Louisville metropolitan area
