= Kentucky Bourbon Festival =

American whiskey-tasting event in Bardstown

Coordinates: 37.8110°N 85.4707°W

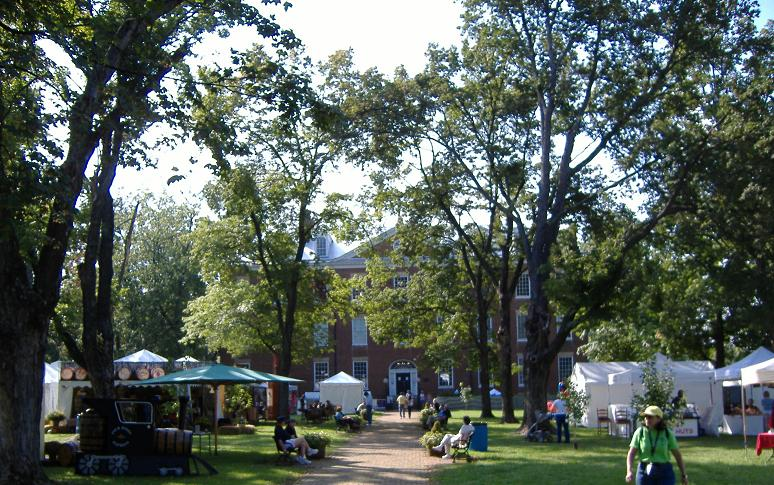
Lawn of the festival

The Kentucky Bourbon Festival is a weeklong activity consisting of more than thirty events in Bardstown, Kentucky, United States, dedicated to celebrating the history and art of distilling bourbon whiskey. The organizers of the festival promote the strong association between bourbon and the city of Bardstown, and have trademarked the phrase "Bourbon Capital of the World" to apply specifically to Bardstown. Bardstown has been the site of bourbon distilleries since 1776.

The event started in 1991 as a dinner and bourbon tasting for 250 people. The event now draws more than 6,000 ticketed guests each year from more than a dozen countries including Japan and the U.K. The festival has sold out every year since becoming a ticketed event in 2021.

The Kentucky Bourbon Festival is held on the scenic grounds of Spalding Hall, home to the Oscar Getz Museum of Whiskey.

More than 65 distilleries participate in the Kentucky Bourbon Festival, offering opportunities to taste and buy products, meet master distilleries, and explore festival-only release. A slate of premium events include cocktail, pairing, and culinary sessions.

The festival moved online in 2020 as the physical part was scrapped on grounds of COVID-19 pandemic.

The festival, since 2021, has been moved back to an in-person event in its original place of Bardstown, Kentucky.

== See also ==
- American Whiskey Trail
- Kentucky Bourbon Trail
- List of attractions and events in the Louisville metropolitan area
- Whiskey
- Oscar Getz Museum of Whiskey History
