= Grady Clay =

American journalist (1916–2013)

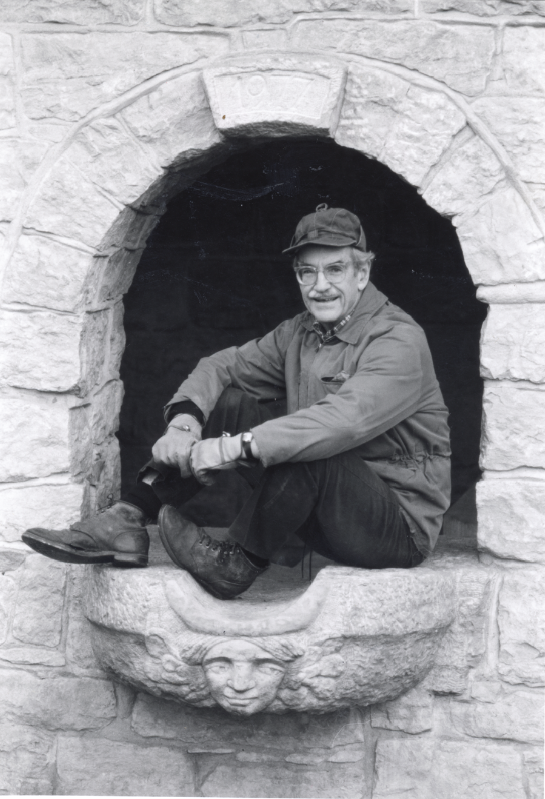
- Born: Grady Edward Clay, Jr; November 5, 1916; Ann Arbor, Michigan, U.S.
- Died: March 17, 2013 (aged 96); Louisville, Kentucky, U.S.
- Occupations: Journalist; Author; Magazine editor

Grady Edward Clay Jr (November 5, 1916 – March 17, 2013) was an American journalist and urbanist specializing in landscape architecture and urban planning.

In 1962, the American Institute of Architects said of Clay: "The editor of Landscape Architecture is becoming one of the best known and most widely listened to writers and speakers on the problems of land and the city today".

In his 1974 book Close-Up: How to Read the American City, Clay offered a way to "read" modern American cities, saying “A city is not as we perceive it to be by vision alone, but by insight, memory, movement, emotion and language. A city is also what we call it and becomes as we describe it".

== Early life ==
Born in Ann Arbor, Michigan in 1916, Clay was the first of Grady Edward (1889–1946) and Eleanor (née Soloman) (1889–1941) Clay Sr.'s two children. Clay grew up in Atlanta, Georgia, where his father was an ophthalmologist, eye surgeon and the head of the Emory University and Grady Clay Eye clinics.

Clay credited his early family experience for his curiosity that made him a successful urban expert. "I was very lucky to grow up in a family with a zestful curiosity about the world. I inherited a lot of that. I had 26 first cousins, the greatest boon a kid could have. They are surrogate brothers and sisters and confidants".

Clay's appreciation of urban design started early. He said Atlanta's Ansley Park was one of his favorite neighborhoods and an inspiration for him throughout his life. Growing up in Atlanta, he lived first on Walker Terrace, a block from Piedmont Park. Later his family moved to a Neel Reid house on Fifteenth Street. Clay explained the neighborhood, with its curvilinear streets was the first major subdivision added to Atlanta's north side that broke with the old rectangular grid of streets, beginning at Fifteenth Street. His mother gardened in Ansley Park which he said also enhanced his sense of design.

== Newspaper career ==
Clay earned a bachelor's degree from Emory University. After earning his master's degree in journalism from Columbia University, Clay hitch-hiked to Louisville, Kentucky in 1939 for a job interview with the Louisville Times. His first job as a reporter there paid $25 a week.

Enlisting in the U.S. Army at Fort Knox in 1942, he became the distribution officer of the European Edition of YANK Magazine, due to his experience as the rotogravure picture editor at the Courier Journal in Louisville. Later promoted to captain, Clay was placed in charge of the Alaska Edition of YANK.

In 1948, Clay was awarded a Nieman Fellowship for Journalism at Harvard University and spent the year studying urban geography.

Returning to Louisville in 1949, Clay continued to work as a reporter for the Courier Journal and The Louisville Times, reporting primarily on real estate and "urban affairs", (a post he apparently invented, possibly the first such position in the nation).

In 1966, while discussing real estate sections in US newspapers, Ferdinand Kuhn, a writer for the Washington Post, wrote in the Summer 1966 edition of the Columbia Journalism Review: "Of the papers I have seen, the outstanding one in the field is the Louisville Courier-Journal. Its management proceeds from the assumption that the changes around us are too important to be left to the real estate advertisers and their handout men. The Courier-Journal renamed its real estate section, accurately, "City and Countryside" and reshaped it. It put the section, not in charge of a salesman who is called an editor but under an urban affairs editor, Grady CIay, and a building editor, Simpson Lawson. If downtown Louisville has developed a clutter of light poles, signs and other ugly street furniture, the Courier-Journal editors don't hide it from their readers. They put it in a feature, with pictures, on the front page of their City and Countryside section. If commercial zoning is gobbling too much residential space, they dip into this subject too. Their choice of stories is as wide as the field of urban design. They dig up examples, contrasts, ideas applicable to their city from other cities and countries."

Clay left the Courier-Journal and Louisville Times in 1966.

== Urban design career ==
Clay was considered one of the first authorities on urban design. For example, in 1961 he was quoted in Jane Jacobs' seminal Death and Life of Great American Cities, accurately predicting the damage that would be caused by the construction of Interstate 65 to the then-successful shoe district on Louisville's East Market Street.

In his role as an urban affairs observer and reporter, Clay spoke of the popular press at an American Institutes of Architects (AIA) Western Mountain Region conference in Santa Fe the fall of 1965, saying "The architectural profession, i.e., that part of it represented by the AIA, will have to continue its efforts to understand and support a quality environment whether its members are in on the deal (get jobs out of it). If there's really 'No Time for Ugliness,' it's got to cut both ways; and ugliness committed by members will have to get the same rough treatment as ugliness committed by package dealers and other nonmembers of the AIA Anti-Ugly Club." He also suggested that "the Institute (should) re-examine its rule that prohibits one member from making any public evaluation of the work of another."

Upon resigning from the Louisville newspapers in 1966, Clay joined Northwestern University's Medill School of Journalism to help establish its new Urban Journalism Center. Financed by a $1,092,000 grant from the Ford Foundation, Clay was hired to "shape its four-year program" to "offer fellowships" and "conduct briefings, short courses and seminars on urban problems for working journalists and news executives working on urban affairs".

=== Expert consultant ===
Clay's expertise and opinions were sought across the US and the world.

In 1958, Clay was one of eight US citizens chosen to take part in the Netherlands' International Seminar on Urban Renewal at The Hague. Clay also attended the annual congress of the International Federation of Housing and Planning at Liège, Belgium.

In the 1960s, Clay served as a member of the Potomac River Basin Task force, providing advice to Department of the Interior Secretary Stewart Udall. In 1965, he served as panel chairman during the White House Conference on Natural Beauty. His presentation at President Johnson's conference discussed "Water and Waterfronts".

In 1966–1968, Clay served as a member of the Advisory Committee on Urban Development, providing advice to Department of Housing and Urban Development Secretary Robert Weaver. Clay served on President Johnson's Task Force on Suburban Problems in 1967–1968.

Clay also served as an advisor on many land development projects, including the Environmental Planning Advisory Council for the Amelia Island, Florida developments of the Sea Pines Corporation (1971–1975) and the Review Committee for Williamsburg and Busch properties, for the Kingsmill community development project in Williamsburg, Virginia.

=== Landscape Architecture magazine ===
From 1960 to 1984, Clay was the editor of the then quarterly Landscape Architecture magazine, the journal of the American Society of Landscape Architects. It is the magazine of record for the landscape architecture profession in North America.

Before Clay became editor, most articles had been written by professional landscape architects. During Clay's tenure, many contributions were by writers without architecture credentials. He published Ian McHarg's ecological planning research, and covered areas that included use of native species for plantings, landscape sculpture and adventure playgrounds.

Clay regularly filled the pages of the Landscape Architecture magazine with tough, critical stories on land reclamation; pending legislation; and ecology, among others, which he hoped would spur his readers into action.

In an article from the July 2006 Landscape Architecture magazine, editor J. William "Bill" Thompson noted that Clay "once forecast that the design profession with the best information was going to dominate the others – and he wasn't at all sure that landscape architecture had the capacity to generate the best information".

Clay also served as president of the National Association of Real Estate Editors.

== Broadcast career ==
Clay wrote and produced Unknown Places: Exploring the Obvious, a television documentary broadcast in 1982 on the Kentucky Educational Television network. The documentary featured footage of five American cities as an introduction to urbanology. Clay produced the show to illustrate the forces that cause changes in the urban environment and included examples of how cities handle resources, rubbish and environmental threats.

In the 1990s, Clay recorded several commentaries for public radio, in a series titled Crossing the American Grain. The segments aired locally on Louisville's WFPL public radio station during National Public Radio's Morning Edition.

== Monument design competition chair and juror ==
In 1981, Clay served as chair of the selection committee for the design of the Vietnam Veterans Memorial. Columnist James J. Kilpatrick predicted designer Maya Lin's memorial would be "the most moving war memorial ever erected". Clay vigorously defended Lin's design during the initial controversy over the memorial's minimalist design, saying the proposed addition of a realistic statue of Vietnam War era US troops would be "a hell of an intrusion," and that Lin's design "ought to be built and judged. Let the public see what a great work of beauty it is. Once that has happened, I think the public would be in outrage that anything could be foisted on it". Clay later said in March, 1983 "In retrospect, this is what we concluded about Ms. Lin's winning design. It reflected the genius loci, the spirit of the place, and went beyond it to echo the national trauma arising from the Vietnam war and its aftermath. It thus became a memorable work of art in itself."

On March 30, 1986, Clay was elected to serve as chair of the selection committee for the design of the Kent State Memorial. Clay said he believed the competition and the building of a memorial commemorating the events of May 4, 1970 would "serve as a catharsis for the university". Clay also said he hoped the Kent State memorial would encourage cities that experienced racial violence to consider memorial competitions so residents might "deal with their collective memories and to acknowledge the sometimes tragic events that took place."

Clay was a design juror for the Patriots Peace Memorial on River Road in Louisville, Kentucky.

== Community activities ==
He was a founder of the Crescent Hill Community Association, a neighborhood association in Louisville.

== Honors ==
- 1947 - Clay was named a Nieman Fellow at Harvard University.
- 1958 - Clay was elected president of the National Association of Real Estate Editors.
- 1959 - Clay was made an honorary member of the American Institute of Architects (AIA) "for articles appearing in national magazines".
- 1960 - Clay was named a research associate to the Joint Center of Urban Studies at the Massachusetts Institute of Technology.
- Clay was made an honorary member of the American Society of Landscape Architects
- 1973 - Clay was elected president of the American Society of Planning Officials, "an organization of professionals and laymen interested in urban planning".
- 1973 - Clay received a Guggenheim Fellowship for Humanities, US & Canada for Architecture, Planning, & Design.
- 1986 - Clay was awarded an honorary doctorate by Emory University.
- 1999 - Clay was awarded the Olmsted Medal by the American Society of Landscape Architects.
- 2006 - Clay was awarded the Bradford Williams Medal by the American Society of Landscape Architects "to recognize superior writing in Landscape Architecture magazine and excellence in writing about landscape architecture in other mainstream periodicals".
- 2008 - Clay was awarded a Lifetime Achievement Award by the Urban Communication Foundation for his work as "a distinguished urban observer-critic and “extraordinary scholar/journalist who has written about the city for many years... He pioneered the recognition of the inherent connection of design, architecture, quality of life and communication technology".
- 2009 - The Congress for the New Urbanism (CNU) honored Clay with its Athena Medal for his early work in naming and helping define the "New Urbanism" movement. In Clay's 1959 article Metropolis Regained, he identified the principles of a group he named the New Urbanists: "We believe in the city, they would say, not in tearing it down. We like open space, but hold that too much of it is just as bad as too little. We want that multiplicity of choice that the city has always offered, but is now in danger of losing," Clay wrote. "I can only say that all great movements start in murmurs and that I can hear murmurs."
- 2021 - Clay was honored by having a new luxury hotel in Louisville, The Grady, named after him.

== Death ==
Clay suffered an inoperable blood clot in his right leg and died in Louisville, on March 17, 2013, at the age of 96.

== Publications ==
Most of Clay's professional papers were donated to the University of Louisville. His journals and other papers going back to 1939 are in the archives of the Loeb Library at Harvard.

Clay's authorship includes:

- (as contributor) an essay in William H. Whyte's book The Exploding Metropolis 1958, ISBN 978-0520080904
- Metropolis Regained, an essay, Horizon Magazine, 1959
- Close-Up: How to Read the American City, 1974, The University of Chicago Press, ISBN 9780226109459
- Alleys - Being a disquisition upon the origins, natural disposition and occurrences in the American scene of alleys ... a hidden resource 59 pages, 1978, ASIN B0006CY1F2
- Water and the Landscape (as editor), 193 pages, McGraw-Hill Education (February 1, 1979), ISBN 978-0-07-036190-4
- Right Before Your Eyes: Penetrating the Urban Environment, 241 pages, American Planning Association (October 1987), ISBN 978-0-918286-47-5
- 1988 - Off the Beaten Track - Subtitled: Shifting Sands, Sticky Wicket, Fast Track, Outback, Last Ditch, and Armpit of the Nation; an essay, Nieman Reports
- Real Places: An Unconventional Guide to America's Generic Landscape. 322 p., 100 halftones, 16 line drawings. 8½ × 9¼ 1994, ISBN 978-0-226-10946-6
- Crossing the American Grain 2003, ISBN 978-1-884532-51-1
