= Michelle J. Wong =

Costa Rican photojournalist

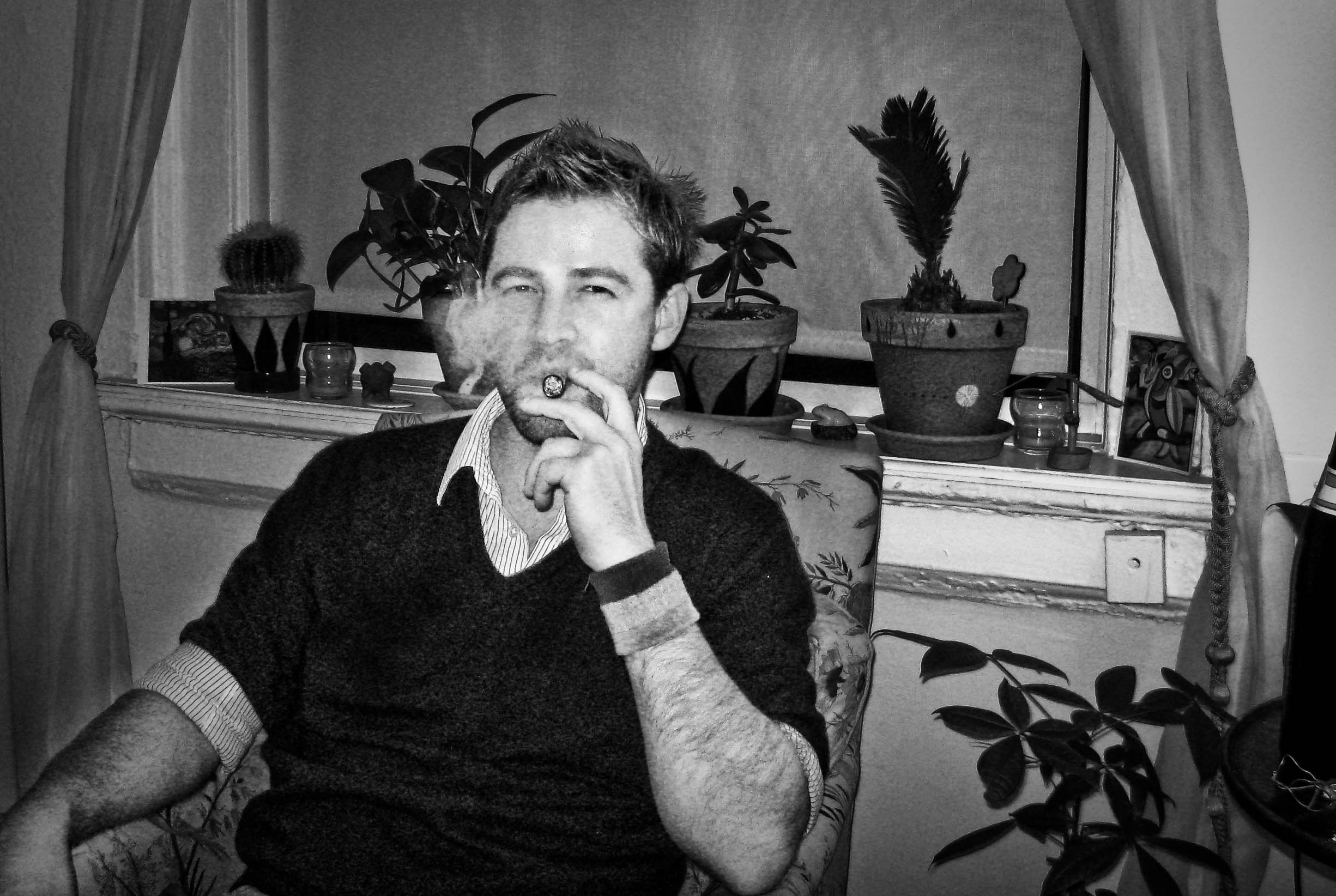
- Photojournalist Michelle J. Wong
- Born: 31 December 1979 (age 46); Heredia, Costa Rica
- Education: Communications, Journalism with emphasis en visual arts, editing, writing and broadcasting, International & Global Studies
- Known for: Photojournalism, journalism, literature
- Website: http://www.mediaadvocacynetwork.org/

Michelle Jefté Wong (born 31 December 1979), also known as Michelle J. Wong, is a Costa Rican independent activist, photographer, journalist, and writer. Wong is a columnist and international correspondent for Latin America and the world, and a leading emerging photojournalist.

== Life ==
Wong was born in Heredia, Costa Rica. At the age of 15 he left home and began his world travels. In 2003, he established himself in Santa Barbara, California, where he began his Journalism, International and Global Studies.

Wong has worked as a photographer and journalist around the world. In 2009, he worked as an intern for Steve McCurry in New York City.

His work in photojournalism has been presented in photography exhibitions in the School of International and Public Affairs at Columbia University, Washington DC, California, New York, Costa Rica, and South America.

In 2011, Wong was awarded 2nd place in the Feature/Multiple Picture category of the National Press Photographers Association (NPPA)'s Monthly News Clip Contest, and in 2013 he was recognized during the humanitarian awards at the Muhammad Ali Center.
