= ITMS =

ITMS may refer to:

- International Thomas Merton Society
- Indian Trails Middle School, a school in Winter Springs, Florida
- Ion trap mobility spectrometry, an instrumental method for chemical detection and analysis
- iTunes Music Store, the former name of the iTunes Store
