= Thomas Merton Center =

Thomas Merton Center may refer to:

- Thomas Merton Center (Pittsburgh)
- Thomas Merton Center (Louisville)
