= Jeffersontown Gaslight Festival =

- Genre: Festival
- Dates: Third weekend in September
- Locations: Jeffersontown, Kentucky, United States
- Years active: 1970–2019, 2021–
- Sponsor: Jeffersontown Chamber of Commerce
- Website: jtowngaslight.com

The Gaslight Festival is an annual festival held in Jeffersontown, Kentucky. It takes place the third weekend of September and the week prior and is considered the unofficial start to fall in Louisville.

== History ==
In 1966 the Jeffersontown Restoration Society led by Peggy Weber and Petra Williams were remodeling Jefersontown's town square. Jeffersontown had just built a new City Hall building in the Federal style and the Restoration Society was able to convince business owners on the town square to remodel their store fronts in the same style. During a separate renovation at a local church one of the original gaslights that lined the town square until 1912 was found under a stairwell. This prompted several replica gaslights to be built and installed in the newly renovated town square and eventually led to the town square's current name; Gaslight Square. To showcase the new renovations and promote the businesses there a festival was held.

The inaugural Gaslight Festival was held on June 7, 1970, immediately preceding the Jeffersontown Community Fair scheduled for June 10–13. Although the festival was originally conceived to promote the Gaslight Square it was decided by Mayor Franklin Chambers that the square was too new and clean to risk throwing a party there. Instead it was held at J-Town Center. The first Gaslight Festival has a half-day event and included a parade that went from City Hall to the Jeffersontown Community Center and carnival rides. The first festival was a success but was overshadowed by that year's Jeffersontown Community Fair.

The second Gaslight Festival in 1971 was again held in June but was Gaslight Square where has been held ever since. The third Gaslight Festival in 1972 was used to celebrate the 175th anniversary of Jeffersontown's founding and was a multi-day event held from September 30 to October 2. Attendance continued to grow and by 1977 it was estimated that 150,000 people attended the festival. Although originally intended to supplement the Community Fair the Gaslight Festival would eventually replace it entirely. The 28th festival celebrated the bicentennial, in 1997.

Today the festival is a ten-day event beginning in early September and attracts over 200,000 visitors, making it the second-largest festival in Kentucky behind the Kentucky State Fair, fifth largest in the region, and in the top 20 in the southeast. Over this ten-day stretch several events take place such as a motorcycle rally, 5K road race, and a parade culminating with the gaslight festival weekend. The gaslight festival weekend is a three-day street festival with over 250 booths, live music, and carnival rides.

After being mostly virtual during 2020 in response to the COVID-19 pandemic, the live events were reinstated in 2021.

== Official events ==
- Motorcycle Rally
- Car Show
- Parade
- 3 Day Street Festival
- Golf Scramble
- 5K Road Race
- Gaslight Bowl, a youth football game
- Workout Series
- Balloon Glow
- Kentucky Pipe Smoking Championship, the oldest gaslight festival tradition

== See also ==
- List of attractions and events in the Louisville metropolitan area
