= Thomas Edison House =

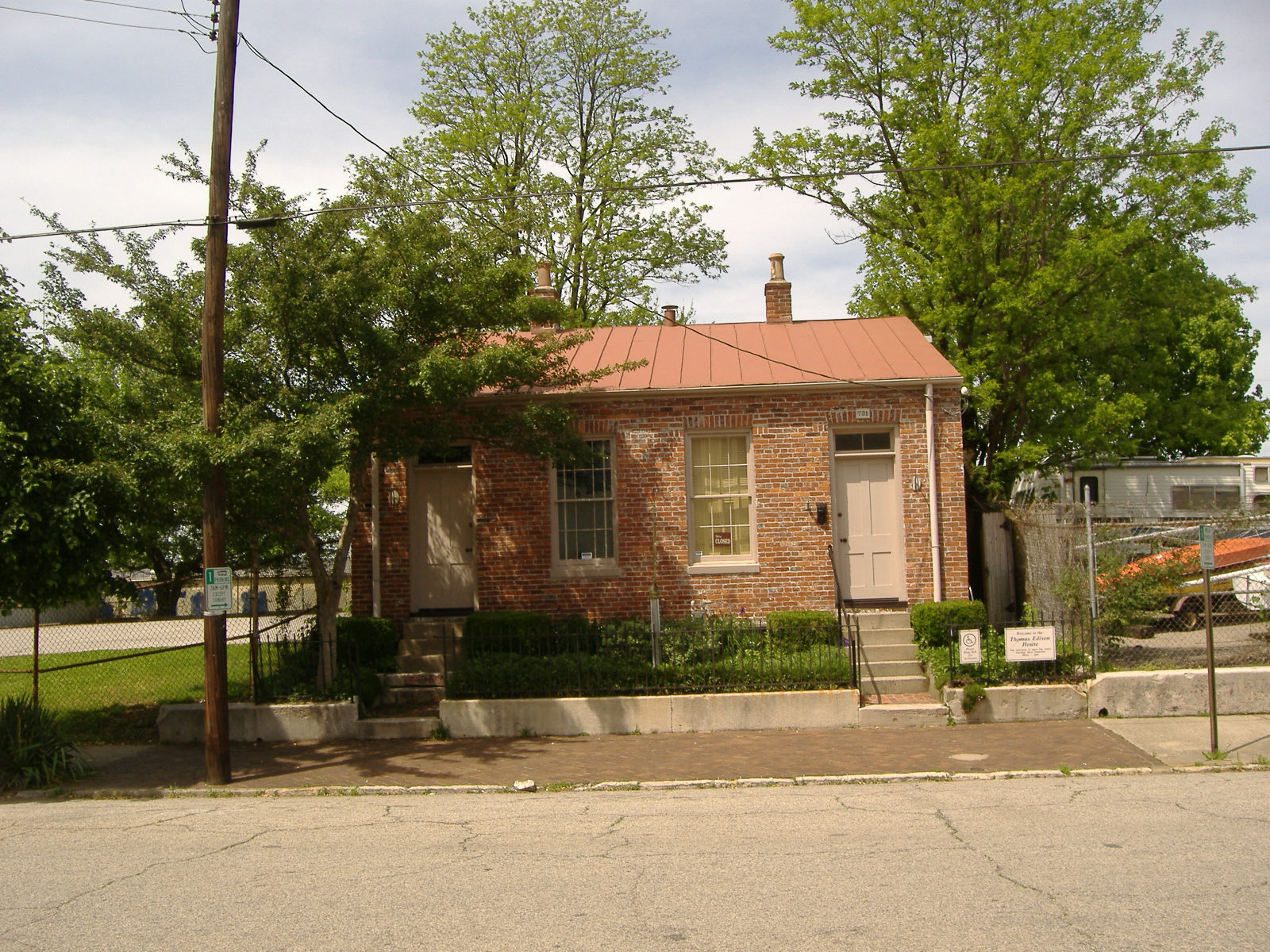
- Thomas Edison House
- Location: 729 East Washington Street; Louisville, Kentucky 40202
- Coordinates: 38.2555°N 85.7383°W
- Type: History museum

Thomas Edison House is a historic house located in the Butchertown neighborhood of Louisville, Kentucky. The house is a shotgun duplex built around 1850. Thomas Edison took up residence in the same neighborhood, possibly even at this location, a part of the time he lived in Louisville from 1866 to 1867. The house features a museum that honors Edison and his inventions.

== See also ==
- List of attractions and events in the Louisville metropolitan area
- List of museums in the Louisville metropolitan area
