= Seneca Park (Louisville, Kentucky) =

Park in Louisville, Kentucky

- Interactive map of Seneca Park
- Type: Municipal
- Location: Louisville, Kentucky
- Coordinates: 38.235496°N 85.671565°W
- Area: 333 acres (1.35 km^{2})
- Created: 1928
- Operator: Louisville Metro Parks
- Status: Open all year

Seneca Park was the last park designed by Frederick Law Olmsted's firm in Louisville, Kentucky, United States. The park system in Louisville was the last of five designed by the Olmsted firm. The park resides in the Louisville neighborhood of Seneca Gardens, Kentucky. The park has been updated over the years to include restrooms and playground equipment that supplements a myriad of trails for people or horses.

According to The Trust for Public Land, Seneca Park has 500,000 visitors annually, making it tied for the 69th most popular municipal park in the United States.

A notable feature of the park's design lies in its location in reference to other parks. As a part of the Louisville Olmsted park system, it is connected to other parks built by the firm, most notably Cherokee Park. This connection can be seen by the parks’ close proximities of one another, and they are easily accessible from another. The park is also located nearby many neighborhoods, likely contributing to the vast number of visitors it sees every year.

== History ==
=== The Olmsted Firm ===
Over the years, the Olmsted Firm has gained increasing notability for their work in landscape and architectural design. Having been founded by Frederick Law Olmsted and Calvert Vaux, the firm has done work in New York, Connecticut, Massachusetts, and more. Between the years of 1857 and 1979, the firm was involved in over 6,000 projects including various suburban communities, private estates and public parks, with Seneca Park being one such project. Frederick Law Olmsted held great ambition for his designs, and believed they could improve the general public's quality of life as well as move society away from the bustling cities and towards suburban community and nature. His predecessors in the firm held similar beliefs and maintained his established standard in their later projects. Seneca Park was created in 1928, decades after Olmsted's death, but his ideals can still be seen reflected in the park's design.

One of many of Olmsted's objectives was to design spaces in a way that each area would have a different style and different activity. This can clearly be seen in the layout of Seneca park where the areas between the golf course, tennis courts, playground, and other features are clearly defined, not only with the actual structures themselves, but also in the utilization of style and variation of the plant life. Another notable design of the park that was purposeful in Olmsted's design is the separation of traffic. As can be seen in the separation of the roads, as well as the 1.2 mile loop that is separated from the road, there is a clear distinction between pedestrian and automobile traffic to increase both the safety and aesthetic of the park.

=== Crime ===
As is with many public spaces, Seneca Park frequently deals with all sorts of crime, ranging from petty misdemeanors such as speeding or littering, to more serious crime like assault or even murder.

For example, Lazaro Pozo Illas was sentenced to 30 years in prison after being found guilty of causing a crash that killed a man and injured another. The devastating incident occurred on the Seneca Park golf course, where Pozo Illas' vehicle struck a golf cart at a crosswalk while driving intoxicated. It was also found that he had been illegally driving previously that day, also through the park going over twice the posted speed limit.

Another incident involved the assault of a nine-year-old boy. In 2021, an unidentified man launched a foreign object at the child using a slingshot. The assault resulted in a fractured skull, and the boy had to undergo several surgeries including the implantation of a titanium plate to fully recover.

== Features ==
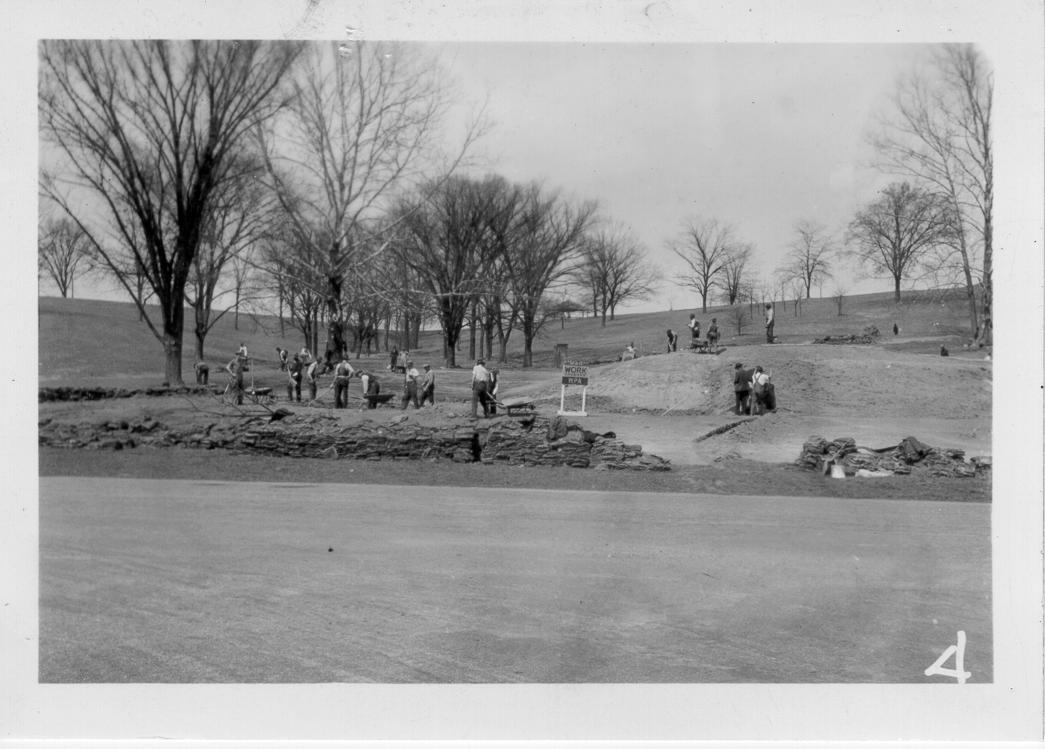
WPA workers building #17 Green at Seneca Park Golf Course

Seneca Park contains a variety of features to attract and entertain visitors of all types. These features include, but are not limited to, hiking trails, horse trails, a variety of sports facilities, and vast amounts of green space for general public use.

- 1.2 mile (1.9 km) track
- 18-hole professional golf course
- Tennis courts
- Playground (divided for older and younger kids)
- Mountain bike trail
- Various other trails for both horses and people
- 5K course
- Baseball field
- Basketball court
- Restrooms

== Biodiversity ==
=== Plant life ===
Seneca Park contains a surprising amount of invasive species (22%) and is dominated by a large number of invasive warm-season grasses. There is also a large amount of diversity that results from its age. This diversity results in higher productivity, but also indicates its low retentive nature. Many of the original plants that were put there are now in much lower proportion, due to the large amount of invasive species that were introduced. Sustaining plant life is a large part of the functionality of parks, and helps decrease environmental degradation. The purpose of the park is not just to provide a public attraction, but also preserves green space and encourages increased biodiversity.

=== Arthropods ===
The park also contains a high diversity of arthropods, likely due to the park's age, and its plant diversity. This is includes a large amount of detritivores and isopods, but surprisingly, no scavengers. However, due to the upkeep done on the grasses in the main area of the park, the arthropod diversity in those areas is significantly decreased because they are given less time to colonize and are consistently disturbed by this maintenance. Additionally, the proportion of prey and predators is about equal, with sap-suckers and herbivores being the primary prey group. The high amount of plant diversity actually results in beneficial aspects for prey, as it makes out increasingly difficult for predators to locate them.

== See also ==
- City of Parks
- List of attractions and events in the Louisville metropolitan area
- List of parks in the Louisville metropolitan area
