= Alpine Ice Arena =

Sports facility in Kentucky, U.S.

- Interactive map of Alpine Ice Arena
- Location: 1825 Gardiner Lane; Louisville, Kentucky
- Coordinates: 38.20789°N 85.68265°W
- Capacity: Various
- Surface: Ice

Website
- alpineicearena.com

Alpine Ice Arena is an arena and recreational sport facility in Louisville, Kentucky. It features ice for hockey, figure skating, and open skating.

== See also ==
- List of attractions and events in the Louisville metropolitan area
