= Danger Run =

- Genre: Outdoor game
- Frequency: Annual, runs approx. a month before Halloween
- Locations: Louisville, Kentucky, U.S.
- Years active: 32
- Inaugurated: 1994
- Most recent: 2023
- Major events: Driving game / scavenger hunt
- Website: www.dangerrun.com

The Danger Run is a Halloween driving game played in a car. Since its founding in 1994 in Louisville, Kentucky, it has been an "interactive Halloween attraction where drivers are given a list of clues to get them from one haunted spot to another." The scavenger hunt provides access to commercial haunted houses. The game is marketed as "The Most Fun You've EVER Had In Your Car!".

== Rules and stops ==
The objective of this game is for participants to precisely decipher a book of clues in the style of a scavenger hunt. Participants are given a book of cryptic directions written as 5-line limerick clues. Clues are solved and used as directions for participants to find their way to selected locations that participate in the Danger Run, which are usually two haunted attractions.

At the beginning of the game, drivers reset their mileage to see if they can match the mileage set by the contest. Participants can check their mileage online afterwards, and if the closest to the correct distance, they go to the finals. Prizes are awarded to the mileage winners.

== History ==
=== 1994–2008 ===
The Danger Run was founded in 1994 in Louisville, Kentucky by Joseph Bulleit. The first "ghost run" in Louisville to incorporate a major haunted house into the event, Danger Run was also the first ghost run to create clues with limericks, which were styled after limericks in The Andy Griffith Show.

During the first season, Danger Run had an attendance of 2,194 people, with Bulleit making a deal with a major commercial haunted house in Louisville, the Haunted Hotel. Attendance in 1995 jumped to over 5,000 people, with the Danger Run expanding to two starting locations in the Louisville area. In addition to the Clarksville, Indiana location, Danger Run offered a starting location on Dixie Highway in Louisville. In 1996, the Danger Run expanded again to a third location. A location was opened at Bigg's Hypermarket in Middletown.

In 1997, 10,000 people participated. By 1997, the ghost runs that originally inspired the idea of Danger Run were all gone. The Danger Run had become the only ghost run in existence. The Danger Run was then bought from Joseph Bulleit by the Nightmare Network. It operated under this umbrella company for 12 years.

In the 2005 season, the Danger Run expanded to open a second attraction called Nightmare Run. Nightmare Run was also a ghost run, but written in a different style. However, upon the occurrence of Hurricane Katrina gas prices skyrocketed. This caused a major decrease in participation in Danger Run. So for the first time, in 2006 Danger Run closed its doors to find a solution, and in 2007 Danger Run offered free gasoline for groups of four or more.

=== 2009–2018 ===
Then in 2009, Joseph Bulleit along with Michael Kimzey and Michael Book purchased the Danger Run from the Nightmare Network. While Joseph was the original owner, both Michael Kimzey and Michael Book had worked for Nightmare Network to produce the Danger Run year after year. In 2009, the organization expected 12,000 to 14,000 people, with routes of about 45 miles that should take 3 hours to finish.

In 2016, it had three starting points, continued to use clues with rhymes and riddles, and led people to two haunted houses in Louisville.

In 2017, the run included admission to two haunted houses, with available "FastLane" tickets reducing wait time in the general admission line.

For 2018, it is again starting in a Lowe's parking lot, with admission to 2 haunted houses and vouchers for cars with 4 or more people. The theme was "looking to find answers to the mysteries surrounding the disappearance of a group of paranormal investigators." Danger Run has had corporate sponsorships through Dairy Queen, Domino's Pizza, Lowe's and Speedway.

== See also ==
- List of attractions and events in the Louisville metropolitan area
