= List of attractions and events in the Louisville metropolitan area =

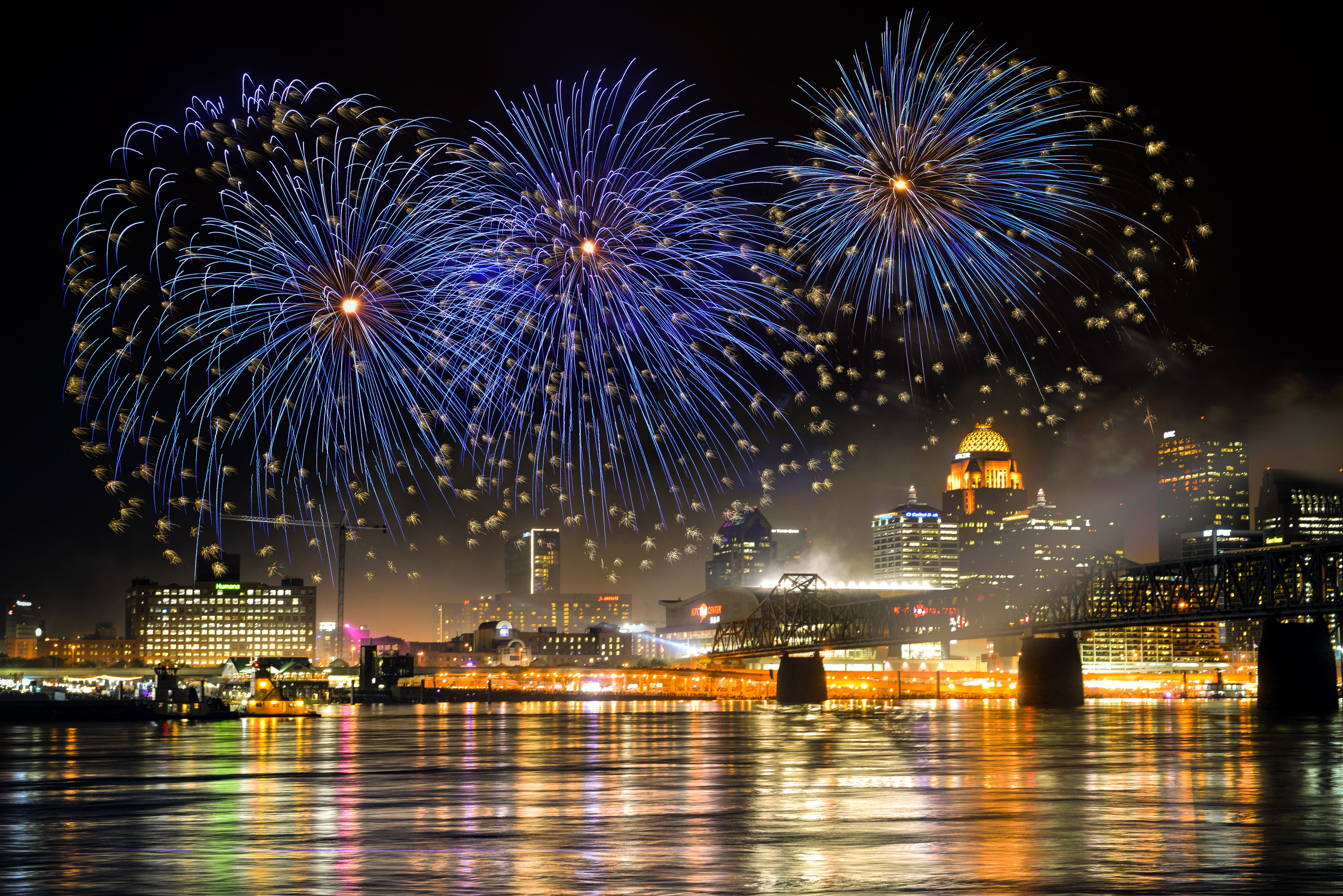
Thunder Over Louisville fireworks during the Kentucky Derby Festival

The following is a list of tourist attractions and organized annual events in the Louisville metropolitan area comprising Louisville, Kentucky and surrounding counties in Kentucky and Indiana.

== Annual festivals and other organized events ==
=== Spring ===
- Abbey Road on the River, a salute to The Beatles with many bands, held Memorial Day weekend in Louisville 2005–2016, but moved across the river to Jeffersonville, Indiana in 2017
- Cherokee Triangle Art Fair, held the weekend before the Kentucky Derby
- ConGlomeration, a multigenre convention held in April
- Frankfort Avenue Easter Parade, a family-friendly event that takes place in the Crescent Hill and Clifton neighborhoods of Louisville, held annually in April
- Highland Renaissance Festival in Eminence, festivities that reproduce aspects of Scottish life during the Renaissance period, along with highland games, held from late May through early July
- Hillbilly Outfield: Kentucky Derby party (Middletown), held in early May to coincide with the Kentucky Derby
- Kentucky Derby Festival, Kentucky's largest single annual event; includes Thunder Over Louisville, Great Steamboat Race, Great Balloon Race, Pegasus Parade and the miniMarathon & Marathon, and is held for two weeks from late April through early May, leading up to the Kentucky Oaks and Kentucky Derby thoroughbred races
- Kentucky Reggae Festival, held Memorial Day weekend
- Starlight Strawberry Festival (Starlight, Indiana), held during Memorial Day weekend
- VEX Robotics World Championships, held Wednesday through Saturday in the week of the Kentucky Derby (2015–17)
- WHAS Crusade for Children, fundraiser held over the first weekend in June

=== Summer ===
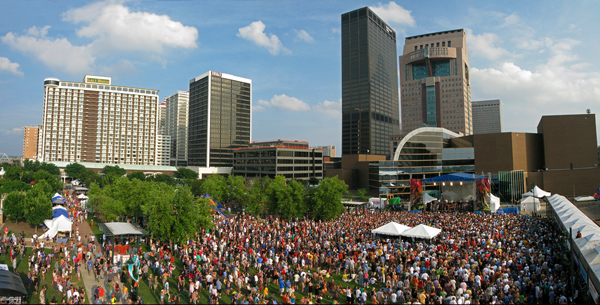
View of the Forecastle Festival on the Belvedere

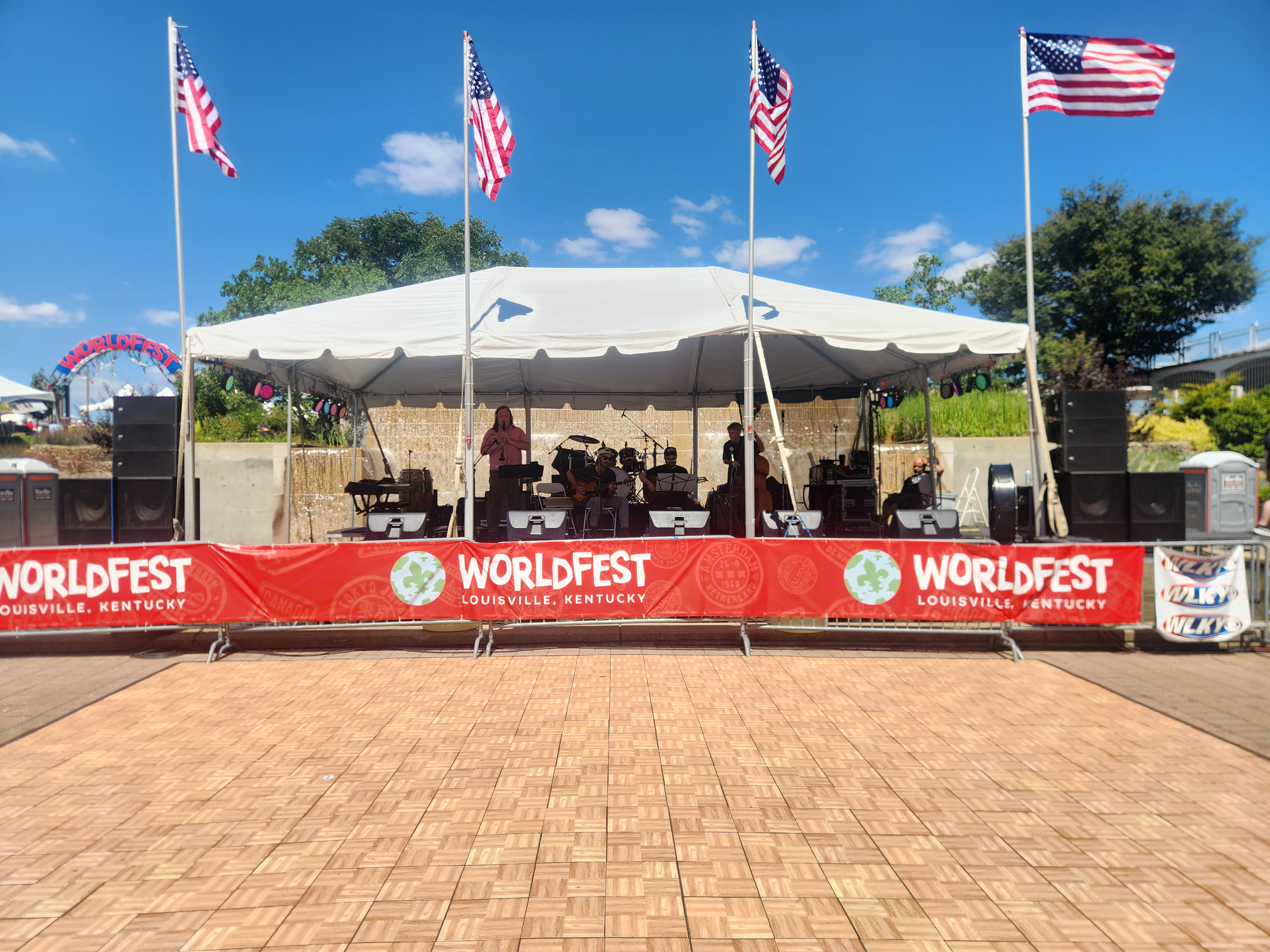
Louisville WorldFest 2024 on the Belvedere

- Jane Austen Festival, a three-day event and the largest Jane Austen event in North America, held on the third weekend of July at Locust Grove
- Bourbon & Beyond, a four-day music festival, touted as "the world's largest music, food & bourbon festival", held in September (late summer)
- Derby City Comic Con, held in late June
- Fandom Fest Comic Expo, held in mid-summer
- Forecastle Festival, a three-day nationally renowned music, art and environmental activism festival, held in July (paused after the 2022 event)
- Fright Night Film Fest, typically held in July
- Jeffersontown Gaslight Festival (Jeffersontown), held in September
- Kentucky Art Car Weekend, held in August
- Kentucky Bourbon Festival (Bardstown), held in September
- Kentucky Shakespeare Festival (commonly called "Shakespeare in Central Park"), with the main productions being a series of plays presented free to the public at Central Park during the summer
- Kentucky State Fair, Kentucky's official state fair, which runs for 11 days at the Kentucky Exposition Center; includes amusements, exhibits, competitions, concerts and the World's Championship Horse Show, ends on the last Sunday of August
- Kentuckiana Pride Festival, series of events in June (around start of summer) in support of LGBT pride and rights
- Lebowski Fest, held in July
- Louder Than Life, a four-day rock/heavy metal music festival, held in September (late summer)
- Louisville Zombie Attack, where thousands of locals dressed and made up as zombies walk down Bardstown Road to a set location; annual event traditionally held on August 29 at 8:29 pm, but now held on the last Saturday in August at the same clock time
- Oktoberfest, held in September (late summer)
- St. Joseph Orphans Picnic, held the second Saturday in August
- Steamboat Days (Jeffersonville, Indiana), three-day festival held in early September
- Street Rod Nationals, held from Thursday to Sunday in the first full week of August
- WorldFest, a four-day international festival, held on Labor Day weekend

=== Fall ===
- Asylum Haunted Scream Park, the subject of the documentary Monsters Wanted, this is five haunted attractions in one location; held from mid-September through Halloween
- Cropped Out, a multi-venue music festival, held in early fall
- Danger Run, from the end of September through the end of October
- Farmington Harvest Festival, held the second Sunday in October at Farmington Historic Plantation
- Garvin Gate Blues Festival, held in Old Louisville in October
- IdeaFestival, a three-day conference that seeks to engage attendees with innovative thinking, held in early fall
- Light Up Louisville & 40 Nights of Lights, begins the day after Thanksgiving
- National FFA Organization Convention & Expo, previously held in Indianapolis, Indiana, was moved to Louisville again in 2013 after a 14-year absence, held in late October/early November
- North American International Livestock Exposition, held in November
- Spirit Ball, a Victorian-inspired masquerade ball held annually the Saturday before Halloween at the Conrad-Caldwell House on St. James Court
- St. James Court Art Show, one of the top-ranked shows of its kind in the country; held in Old Louisville the first weekend of October
- The World's Largest Halloween Party, Louisville Zoo, held 14 nights in October
- Big Four Bridge Arts Festival, held on the first weekend after labor day.
- Festival of Faiths, a multi-day national interfaith gathering featuring music, poetry, film, art and dialogue with internationally renowned spiritual leaders, thinkers and practitioners, held at The Kentucky Center in November.

=== Winter ===
- Carl Casper's Custom Auto Show, held in February at the Kentucky Exposition Center
- Kosair Shrine Circus, held in February
- Louisville Boat, RV & Sportshow, held in January
- National Farm Machinery Show, held in February

== Distinctive locales ==
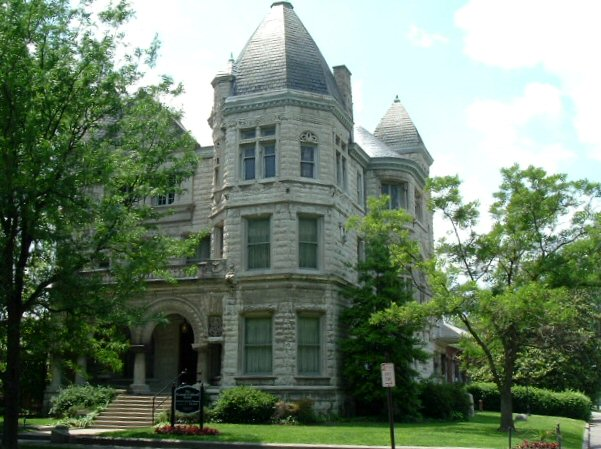
The Conrad-Caldwell House at St James Court and Magnolia Avenue in Old Louisville

=== Louisville Metro ===
- East Market District (NuLu), featuring many art galleries and restaurants, prominently featured in the monthly First Friday Hop
- The Highlands area, which features:
  - Distinctive shops, restaurants and nightlife along Baxter Avenue and Bardstown Road
  - Cherokee Triangle and Original Highlands historic neighborhoods
- Frankfort Avenue, including the Clifton and Crescent Hill neighborhoods—another area with distinctive shops and restaurants
- Louisville Urban Bourbon Trail
- Old Louisville, the third largest historic preservation district in the U.S., which features:
  - the highest number of buildings of Victorian architecture in a U.S. neighborhood
  - Louisville's Central Park
  - St. James Court, famous for the annual St. James Court Art Show
- The West Main District of downtown, including "Museum Row" and featuring some of the oldest structures in the city

=== Southern Indiana ===
- Corydon Historic District
- Mansion Row Historic District (New Albany)
- New Albany Downtown Historic District
- Old Jeffersonville Historic District

== Historic properties ==
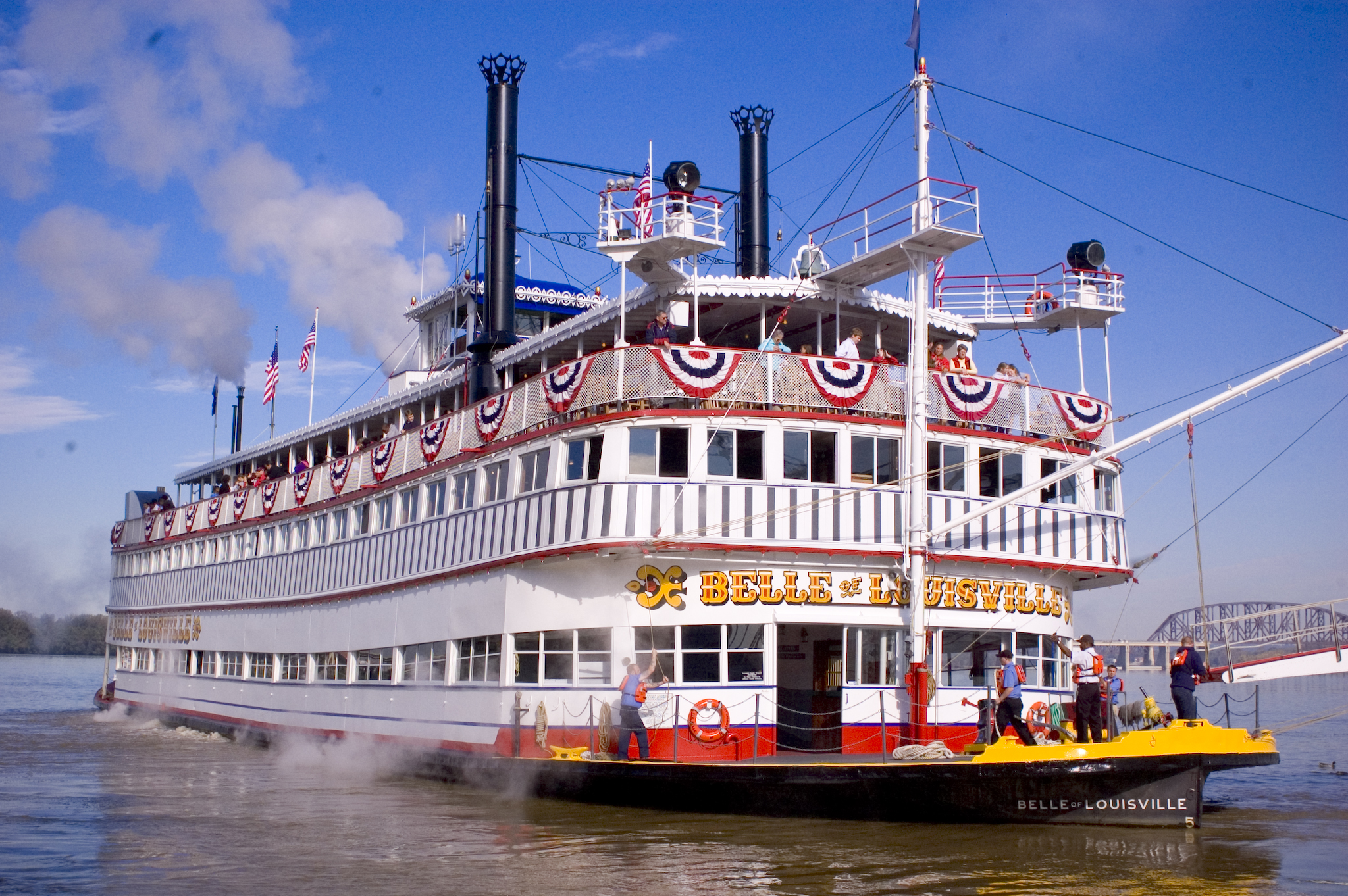
The Belle of Louisville still serves as the symbol of Louisville. She celebrated her 100th birthday in 2014.

- Basilica of St. Joseph Proto-Cathedral (Bardstown), the first Roman Catholic cathedral west of the Appalachian Mountains
- Belle of Louisville, the oldest Mississippi-style steamboat in operation on the inland waterways of the U.S. (built 1914–1915 in Pittsburgh for service in Memphis as the Idlewild, renamed Avalon in 1948, purchased by Jefferson County and renamed Belle of Louisville in 1962)
- Bray Place, the land and 1796 home, now called the Bashford Manor Bed and Breakfast, one of the oldest houses in Kentucky
- The Brennan House
- Brown Hotel, where the Hot Brown was invented
- Cathedral of the Assumption
- Colgate Clock (Clarksville, Indiana), the fourth largest clock in the United States
- Colonial Gardens, a restaurant complex and local landmark in the Kenwood Hill neighborhood, originally built in 1902, and renovated 2017–2021
- Conrad-Caldwell House
- Crescent Hill Reservoir
- Culbertson Mansion State Historic Site (New Albany, Indiana), most noted for its annual haunted house located in the mansion's carriage barn
- Farmington Historic Plantation, including the Thomas Jefferson-designed home of the Speed family, visited by Abraham Lincoln
- The Filson Historical Society, a historical society and research library housed in the Ferguson Mansion, a Beaux-Arts style mansion built in 1906
- Fort Duffield, a Civil War fort
- Fort Knox, including the U.S. Bullion Depository and General George Patton Museum of Leadership (Bullitt, Hardin and Meade Counties)
- Fort Nelson Park, located in the same spot as the second on-shore fort in Kentucky
- Historic Locust Grove farm, home of George Rogers Clark and site of the homecoming of Lewis and Clark
- Little Loomhouse
- Louisville Stoneware, making pottery since 1815
- My Old Kentucky Home State Park (Bardstown), featuring the Federal Hill mansion (inspiration for Stephen Foster's My Old Kentucky Home) and Stephen Foster - The Musical
- Peterson–Dumesnil House
- Riverside, The Farnsley–Moremen Landing
- Scribner House (New Albany, Indiana)
- Seelbach Hotel, the famous hotel written about by F. Scott Fitzgerald and frequently visited by Al Capone
- Spalding Hall (Bardstown)
- Thomas Edison House
- Union Station
- United States Marine Hospital
- Vogue Theater, a movie theater in St. Matthews that closed in 1998, known for showing The Rocky Horror Picture Show for 25 years. Its sign is being refurbished as a historical landmark.
- Waverly Hills Sanatorium
- Whiskey Row, located in the first block of West Main Street, a collection of Revivalist and Chicago School-style buildings with cast-iron storefronts built between 1852 and 1905
- Whitehall House & Gardens
- Whitney Young Birthplace and Museum

=== National Register of Historic Places listings ===
- Jefferson County
  - Anchorage
  - Downtown Louisville
  - The Highlands
  - Old Louisville
  - Portland
  - West End
- Bullitt County
- Henry County
- Meade County
- Nelson County
- Oldham County
- Shelby County
- Spencer County
- Trimble County
- Clark County, Indiana
- Floyd County, Indiana
- Harrison County, Indiana
- Washington County, Indiana

== Museums, galleries and interpretive centers ==
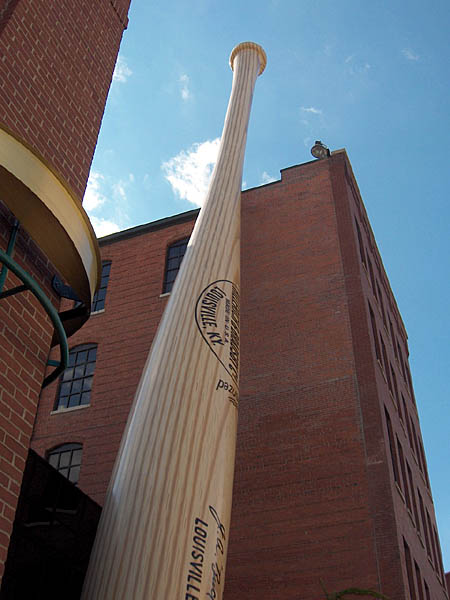
A giant baseball bat adorns the outside of Louisville Slugger Museum & Factory in downtown Louisville

=== Art ===
- 21c Museum Hotel
- Carnegie Center for Art & History (New Albany, Indiana)
- KMAC Contemporary Art Museum
- Speed Art Museum

=== Regional history ===
- Falls of the Ohio State Park interpretive center, a museum covering the natural history related to findings in the nearby exposed Devonian fossil beds as well as the human history of the Louisville area
- The Filson Historical Society, features a museum and extensive historical collections, currently undergoing major expansion
- Historic Locust Grove Visitors Center, which includes a museum
- Howard Steamboat Museum (Jeffersonville, Indiana)
- Kentucky Derby Museum
- Kentucky Railway Museum (New Haven)
- Louisville Slugger Museum & Factory
- My Old Kentucky Home State Park (Bardstown)
- Portland Museum
- Riverside, The Farnsley–Moremen Landing Visitors Center, which includes a museum
- Thomas Edison House
- Whitney Young Birthplace and Museum

==== Bourbon ====
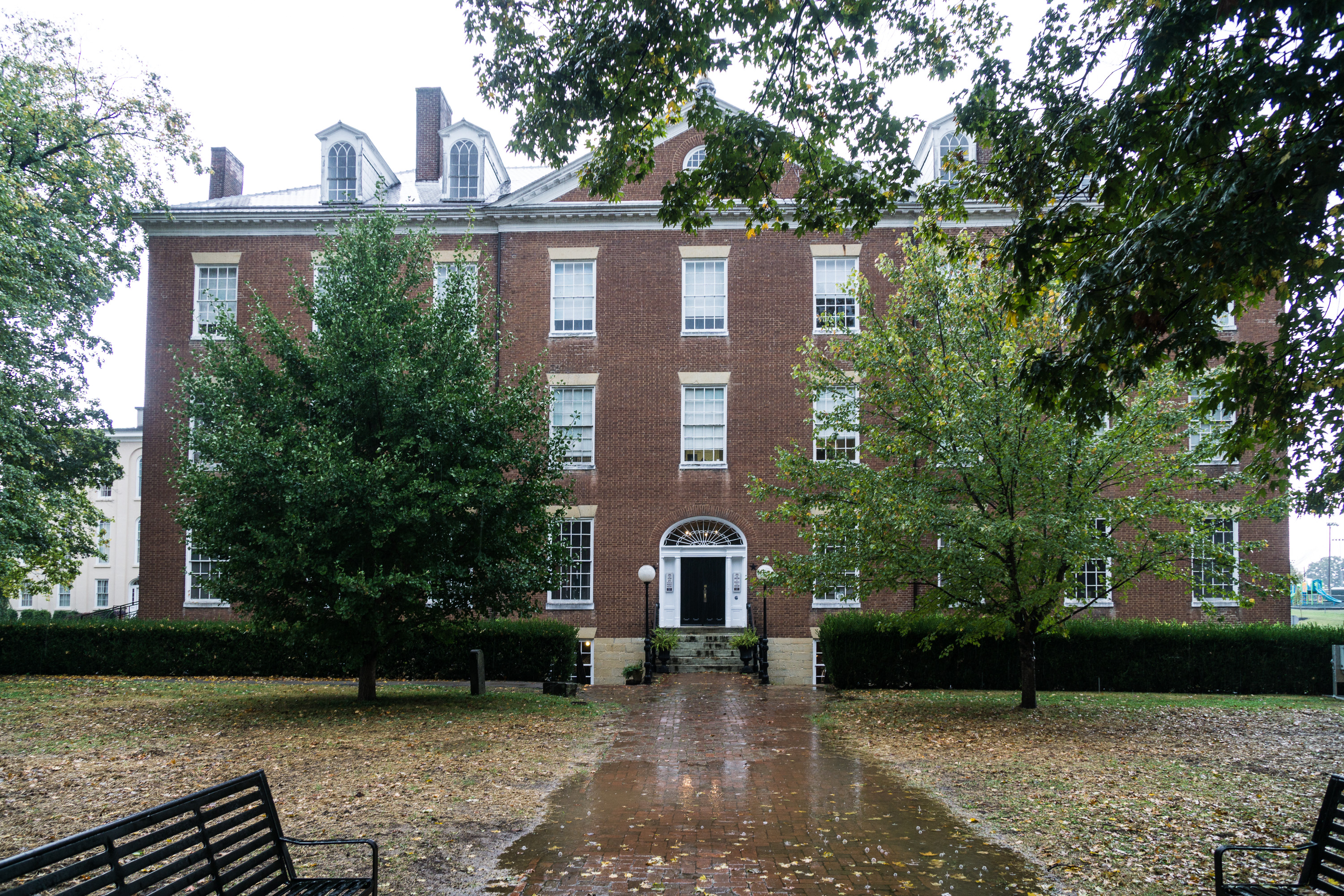
Spalding Hall in Bardstown, which houses both the Bardstown Historical Museum and the Oscar Getz Museum of Whiskey History

- Evan Williams Bourbon Experience, located on Louisville's Whiskey Row, featuring bourbon history and tastings, and interprets Louisville's wharf history in the 1790s
- Heaven Hill Distilleries Bourbon Heritage Center (Bardstown)
- Jim Beam American Stillhouse (Clermont)
- Oscar Getz Museum of Whiskey History (Bardstown)
- Stitzel–Weller Distillery (Shively)

==== Cities ====
- Bardstown Historical Museum (Bardstown)
- Corydon Capitol State Historic Site (Corydon, Indiana)
- Historic Middletown Museum
- Jeffersontown Historical Museum (Jeffersontown)

==== Counties ====
- The Bullitt County History Museum (Shepherdsville)
- Clark County Museum (Jeffersonville, Indiana)
- Henry County Historical Society (New Castle)
- Oldham County History Center (La Grange)

More regional historical collections can be found at the Louisville Free Public Library and the University of Louisville.

=== U.S. and world history ===
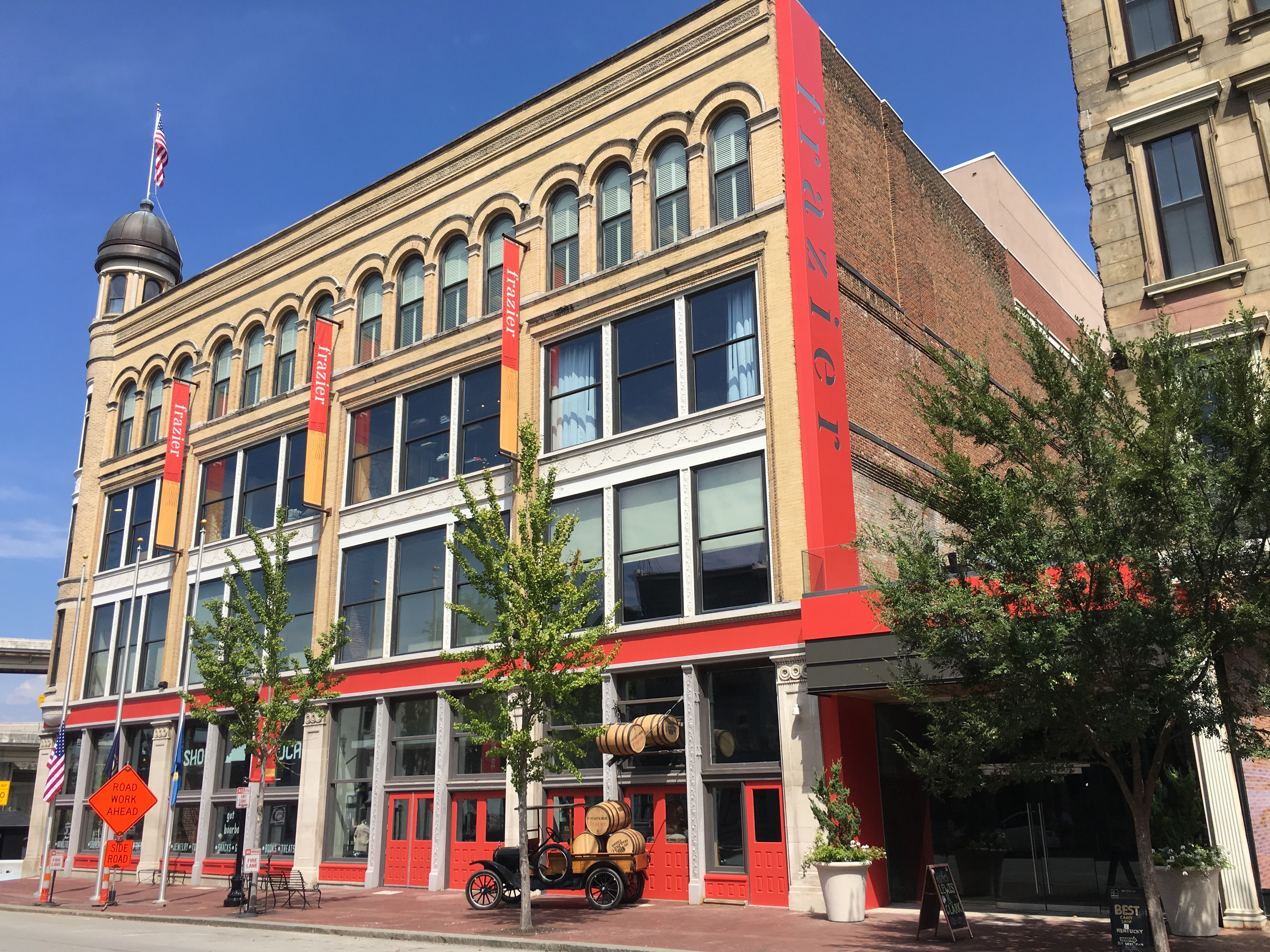
Front facade of the Frazier History Museum

- Museum of the American Printing House for the Blind
- Civil War Museum (Bardstown), including the Civil War Museum of the Western Theater, Pioneer Village, Women's Civil War Museum, War Memorial of Mid America and the Wildlife Museum
- Frazier History Museum, features war weaponry and related historical artifacts, especially focusing on British and U.S. conflicts
- John Hay Center
- Louisville Slugger Museum & Factory, showcases the history of the Louisville Slugger and baseball in general
- General George Patton Museum of Leadership (Fort Knox)
- SAR Education Center and Museum (opening in 2027), features a historical museum, education center, library, and a genealogical collection by the National Society of the Sons of the American Revolution

=== Other subjects ===
- Kentucky Science Center, hands-on science museum featuring a four-story digital theater
- Louisville WaterWorks Museum, located at the Louisville Water Tower
- Muhammad Ali Center
- Schimpff's Candy Museum (Jeffersonville)
- Thomas Merton Center

== Parks and other outdoor attractions ==
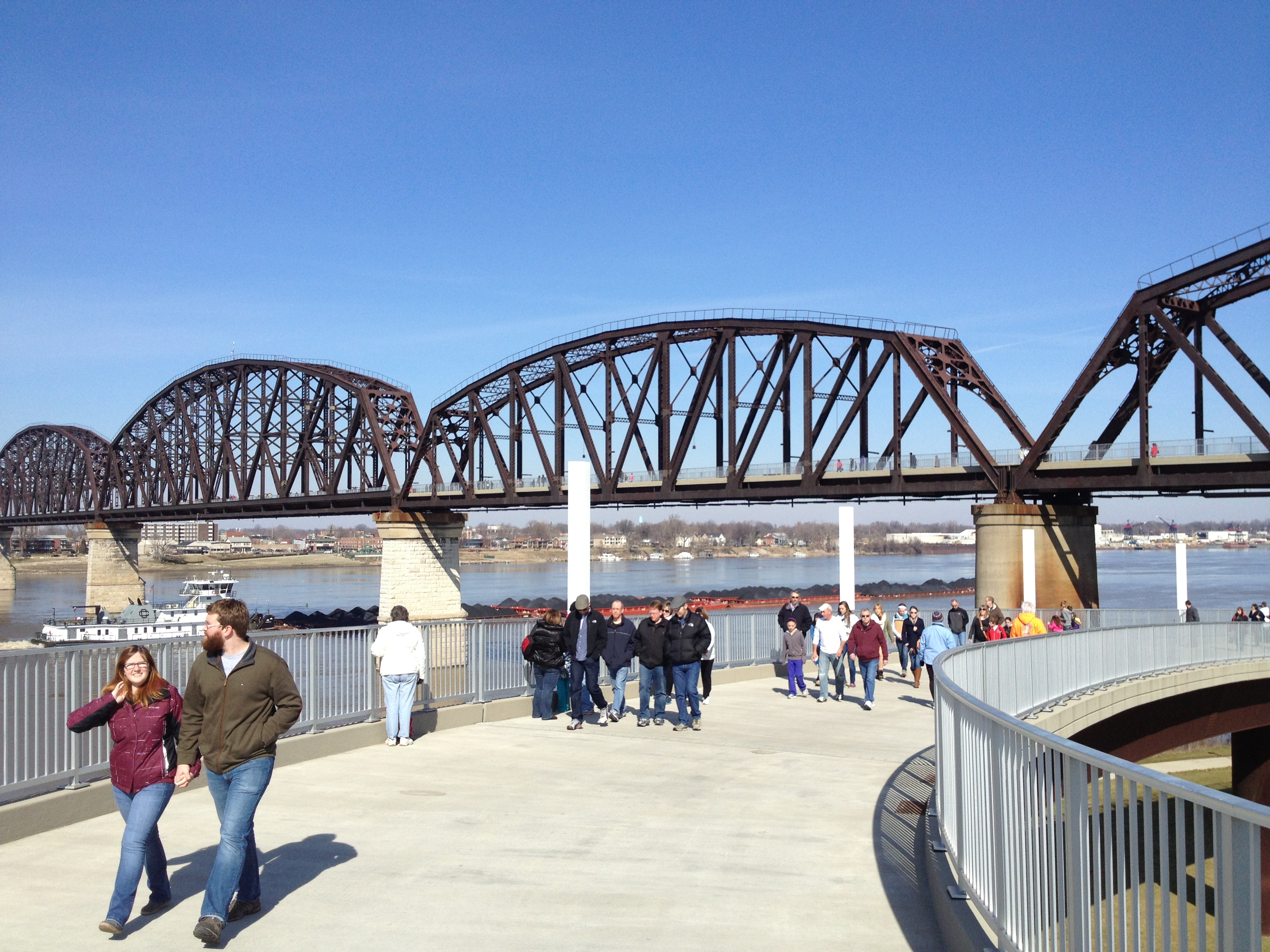
The Big Four Bridge is a pedestrian bridge that connects the downtown area to Jeffersonville, Indiana

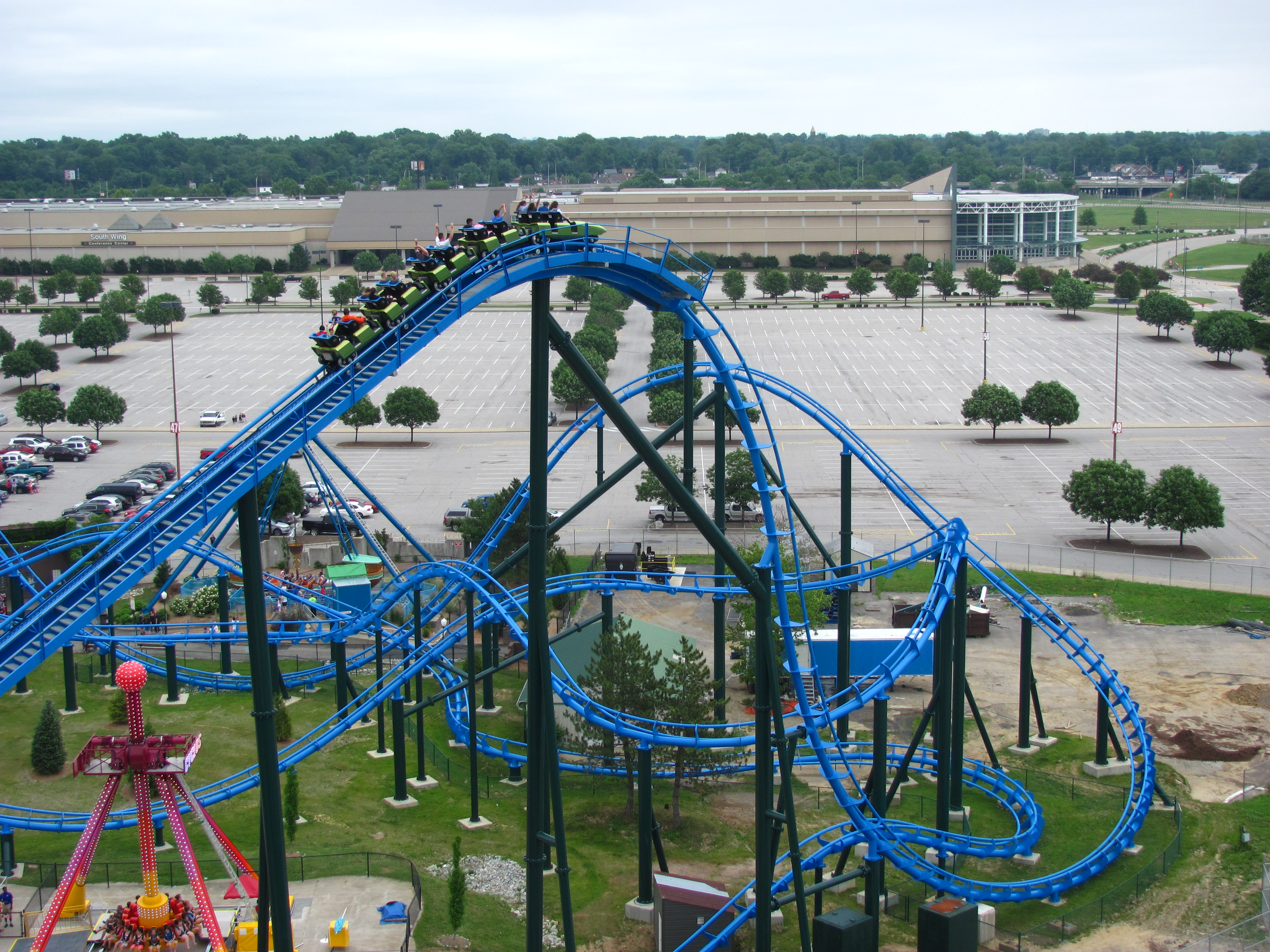
Lightning Run, a steel roller coaster at Kentucky Kingdom

Louisville is home to many spacious city parks, several designed by Frederick Law Olmsted, as well as forested areas, trails and other outdoor attractions; distinctive examples include:

- Beargrass Creek State Nature Preserve
- Bernheim Arboretum and Research Forest (Bullitt County)
- Big Four Bridge, a pedestrian and bicycle bridge connecting Louisville and Jeffersonville, Indiana
- Blackacre Nature Preserve and Historic Homestead
- Bridges to the Past (Fort Knox), closed indefinitely due to work on railroad bridge
- Camp Carlson (Fort Knox)
- Cave Hill Cemetery
- Central Park
- Cherokee Park, includes the Hogan's Fountain Pavilion and Cherokee Golf Course, and many other landmarks and features
- Falls of the Ohio National Wildlife Conservation Area (Clarksville, Indiana), which includes Falls of the Ohio State Park and features the oldest exposed Devonian fossil beds in the United States
- Huber's Orchard, Winery and Vineyards (Starlight, Indiana)
- Indiana Caverns (near Corydon, Indiana)
- Iroquois Park, includes the locally popular Iroquois Amphitheater, scenic overlooks and the Iroquois Golf Course
- Jefferson Memorial Forest, in southwest Louisville, the largest municipal urban forest in the United States
- Kentucky Kingdom and Hurricane Bay, previously known as Six Flags Kentucky Kingdom, a 63-acre (25 ha) amusement park with 50 amusement rides and a water park. Named by MSN Travel as one of the top ten amusement parks in America for 2015.
- Louisville Clock, formerly at Theatre Square (dismantled in 2015)
- Louisville Loop, a partially completed 110-mile (180 km) bike and pedestrian trail encircling Louisville, including:
  - Riverwalk
  - Levee Trail
  - Mill Creek Trail
- Louisville Water Tower Park
- Louisville Waterfront Park, features annual Thunder Over Louisville fireworks and air show during the Kentucky Derby Festival
- Louisville Zoo
- McAlpine Locks and Dam
- Mega Cavern
- Otter Creek Outdoor Recreation Area (Meade County)
- The Parklands of Floyds Fork
- Patriots Peace Memorial
- Renaissance Fun Park (Middletown)
- Riverfront Plaza/Belvedere, adjacent to Downtown Louisville and Louisville's wharf
- E. P. "Tom" Sawyer State Park
- Seneca Park, includes the Seneca Golf Course
- Shawnee Park, includes the Shawnee Golf Course
- Squire Boone Caverns (Mauckport, Indiana)
- Tioga Falls Hiking Trail (Fort Knox), closed indefinitely due to work on railroad bridge
- Waterfront Botanical Gardens
- Waverly Park, includes the 9-hole Bobby Nichols Golf Course
- Yew Dell Botanical Gardens (Crestwood)
- Zachary Taylor National Cemetery

== Shows and performing arts ==
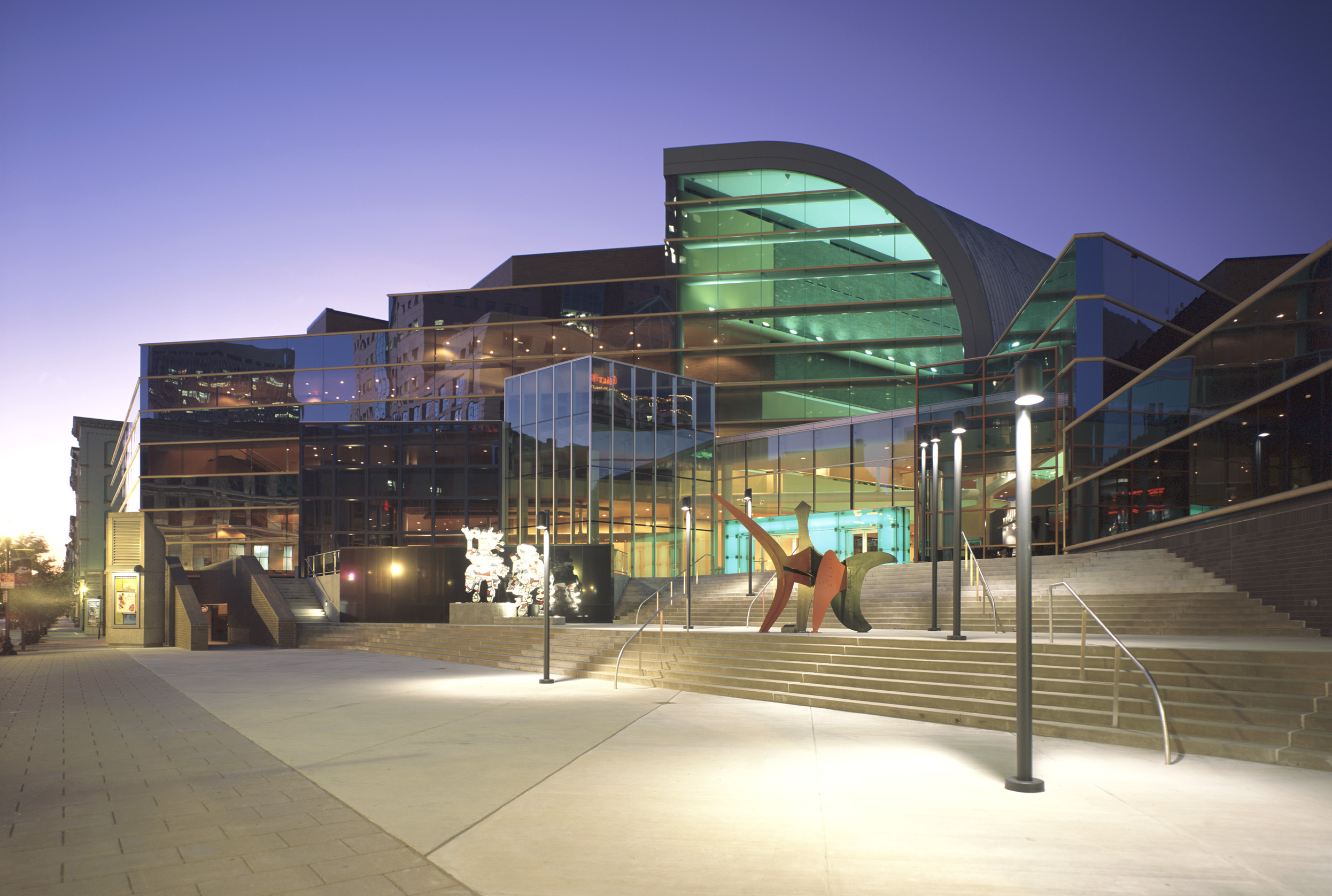
The Kentucky Center in Downtown Louisville

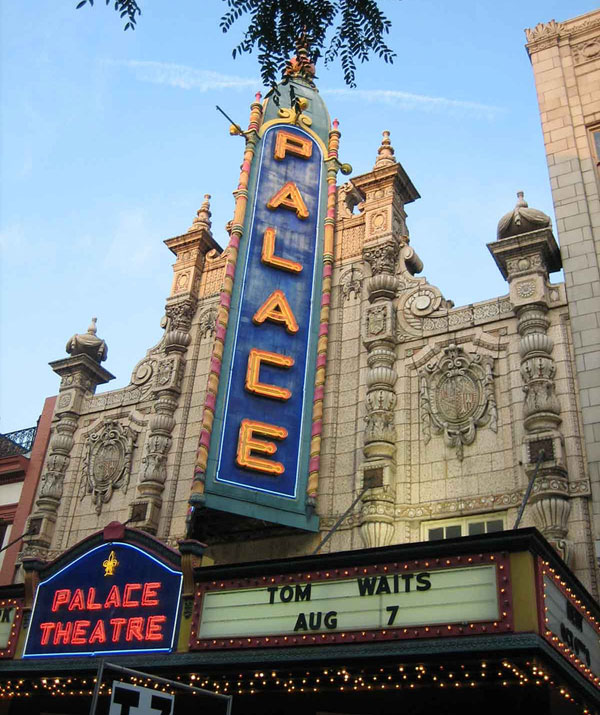
The Louisville Palace

=== Venues ===
- Actors Theatre, producing the Humana Festival of New American Plays, among many other productions
- Baxter Avenue Filmworks, with a monthly audience participation showing of The Rocky Horror Picture Show
- Caesars Southern Indiana (Elizabeth, Indiana)
- Derby Dinner Playhouse (Clarksville, Indiana)
- Fourth Street Live!, a downtown entertainment and retail complex
- Gheens Science Hall and Rauch Planetarium (University of Louisville)
- Headliners Music Hall
- Highview Arts Center
- IMAX theaters at the Kentucky Science Center and Showcase Stonybrook Cinemas
- Iroquois Amphitheater
- The Kentucky Center
- KFC Yum! Center
- The Laughing Derby at Comedy Caravan
- Louisville Gardens
- The Louisville Palace
- Mercury Ballroom

=== Performers ===
- Actors Theatre of Louisville
- Bunbury Theatre Company
- The Chamber Theatre
- Commonwealth Theatre Center
- Faithworks Studios
- Highview Arts Center
- Kentucky Shakespeare Festival
- Little Colonel Players (Pewee Valley)
- Looking For Lilith
- Louisville Chorus
- Louisville Fringe Festival
- Louisville Orchestra
- Louisville Thoroughbreds
- Mind's Eye Theatre Company
- Pandora Productions
- Squallis Puppeteers
- StageOne Family Theatre
- Teatro Tercera Llamada
- Voices of Kentuckiana
- Wayward Actors Company

== Sports-related attractions and venues ==
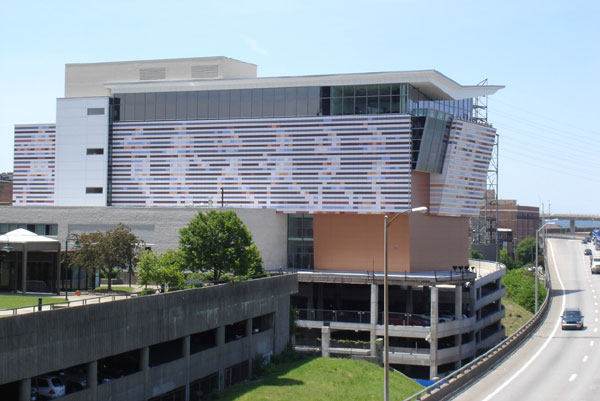
The Muhammad Ali Center

- Alpine Ice Arena
- Churchill Downs thoroughbred racetrack and the Kentucky Derby Museum
- David Armstrong Extreme Park
- Freedom Hall
- Jim Patterson Stadium, home of University of Louisville baseball
- Kentucky International Convention Center
- KFC Yum! Center, home of University of Louisville basketball
- Knob Creek Gun Range (in Bullitt County near West Point), which was famous for its twice-yearly machine gun shoot until the event was discontinued after the October 2021 edition
- L&N Federal Credit Union Stadium, home of University of Louisville football
- Lindsey Golf Course (Fort Knox)
- Louisville Champions Park, a park that "offers flexible space for a variety of field sports", including soccer
- Louisville Metro Parks public golf courses
  - Charlie Vettiner Park
  - Cherokee Park (9-hole)
  - Crescent Hill Park (9-hole)
  - Iroquois Park
  - Long Run Park
  - Seneca Park
  - Shawnee Park
  - Sun Valley Park
  - Waverly Park (Bobby Nichols) (9-hole)
- Louisville Slugger Field, a baseball park that is home to the Louisville Bats
- Louisville Slugger Museum & Factory
- Lynn Family Stadium, home of Louisville City FC (USL Championship), Racing Louisville FC (NWSL), and the Louisville Kings (UFL)
- Dr. Mark & Cindy Lynn Stadium, not to be confused with the above; home of Louisville Cardinals men's and women's soccer
- Muhammad Ali Center
- Owsley B. Frazier Stadium, home of several outdoor sports at Bellarmine University, most notably men's lacrosse
- Valhalla Golf Club, designed by professional golfer Jack Nicklaus

== Miscellaneous ==
- Rooster Run (Nelson County), a general store well known for baseball caps featuring its logo and a 13.5-foot (4.1 m)-tall fiberglass rooster statue standing in front of the store. According to The Kentucky Encyclopedia, it is "one of the best-known general stores in the country and one of Kentucky's best-known unincorporated businesses".

== See also ==
- Kentucky § Tourism
- List of attractions and events in Indianapolis
