= Louisville Zombie Attack =

The Louisville Zombie Attack, which started on August 29, 2005, as a flash mob, is a public event in Louisville, Kentucky held annually in August.

== History ==
Before 2016, the event had been held on August 29 at 8:29 p.m., but the 2016 event was moved to August 27 (which fell on a Saturday that year) at the same time and rebranded as the "Louisville Zombie Walk". This resulted in a lawsuit between two of the event's co-founders, John King and Lyndi Curtis, which resulted in Curtis abandoning all rights to the event. The Louisville Zombie Walk's co-organizer, Jason Bessemann, was not named in the suit and went on to promote the 2017 Louisville Zombie Walk as a separate event three days before the original. Several thousand participants dressed and made up as zombies gather in the Highlands area and march down Bardstown Road to the end point of the walk. An after party is typically thrown by all the bars included in the nightlife throughout the street after the walk. Some of the bars included are: Nowhere Bar, Highlands Taproom, Big Bar, Baxter's, and many others in the local area. Throughout the years, the walk grew by thousands as word of mouth caught on. The last few years, the walk has generated over 10,000 walkers, with 30,000 in 2013 and 32,000 in 2014. Over 40,000 walkers were anticipated for the 2015 event. It began as a birthday party for three friends, but has turned into a real event recognized by local businesses. The event typically costs around $10,000 to function, but the event is kept free to the public due to donations.

The 2015 event ended in a minor controversy due to excessive amounts of trash left behind by participants. That year's event coincided with the Highlands Festival, another major annual neighborhood event, and according to one media report, the city government failed to follow some standard procedures that could have assured a timely cleanup. In the wake of the event, the office of mayor Greg Fischer indicated that the city would reconsider whether to allow the event in the future if cleanup issues were not addressed. The Louisville government has since established policies requiring that the organizers of public events submit a cleanup plan in advance, with the plan being reviewed before a permit is issued. The organizers of the Zombie Walk hired a cleanup company for the 2016 event.

In 2017, King organized a revamped event on the original date of August 29 billed as "Louisville Zombie Attack: A Funeral for Indecency", since the original Zombie Attack could not compete with an identical event in the same place only three days before. This will feature live music and entertainment, costume contests, a George A. Romero tribute movie marathon and a pinball tournament.

== See also ==
- List of attractions and events in the Louisville metropolitan area
