= Louisville Chorus =

Louisville Chorus, established 1939 in Louisville, Kentucky, is the longest-running and most frequently performing choral arts agency in Kentuckiana and neighboring states.

Louisville Chorus has filmed concerts for international broadcast on EWTN, the largest religious media network in the world, and has recorded music for Hollywood in the making of movies. Louisville Chorus is also a member of Chorus America and has had music chosen for nationwide broadcast on the first nationally distributed radio series to focus exclusively on the art of choral music performance.

A professional chorus of auditioned singers, Louisville Chorus provides a repertoire ranging from choral masterworks with orchestra to pops, family-oriented, Broadway, and celebrations of Christmas, Valentine's Day, and Fourth of July. It performs with other arts agencies including adult and youth ensembles, and offers concerts for arts series and other events throughout Kentuckiana.

The Kentucky Arts Council, the state arts agency, provides partial operating support to Louisville Chorus with state tax dollars and federal funding from the National Endowment for the Arts.

Louisville Chorus is supported by the Louisville Fund for the Arts.

== History ==
In 1939, Father Joseph Emrich founded The Holy Name Choral Club, which later became The Choral Club of Louisville in 1972 and Louisville Chorus in 1987. Joseph Herde succeeded Father Emrich. Richard Spalding, Conductor Emeritus, devoted 20 years to this choral arts agency and made possible its 1985 European Sister Cities Concert Tour.

From 1991 to 2002, the Louisville Chorus was led by director Daniel Spurlock. S. Timothy Glasscock became the new artistic director in late 2002. Therese Davis was the long-time executive director and pianist.

Davis has collaborated with the music directors since 1969 to ensure high standards and the successful growth and development of the chorus. In June 2009 Daniel Spurlock returned as music director. David Borman is the chorus' artistic director.

== See also ==
- List of attractions and events in the Louisville metropolitan area
