= Civil War Museum (Bardstown) =

Museum in Bardstown, Kentucky, United States

Coordinates: 37°48′39.95″N 85°27′44.44″W

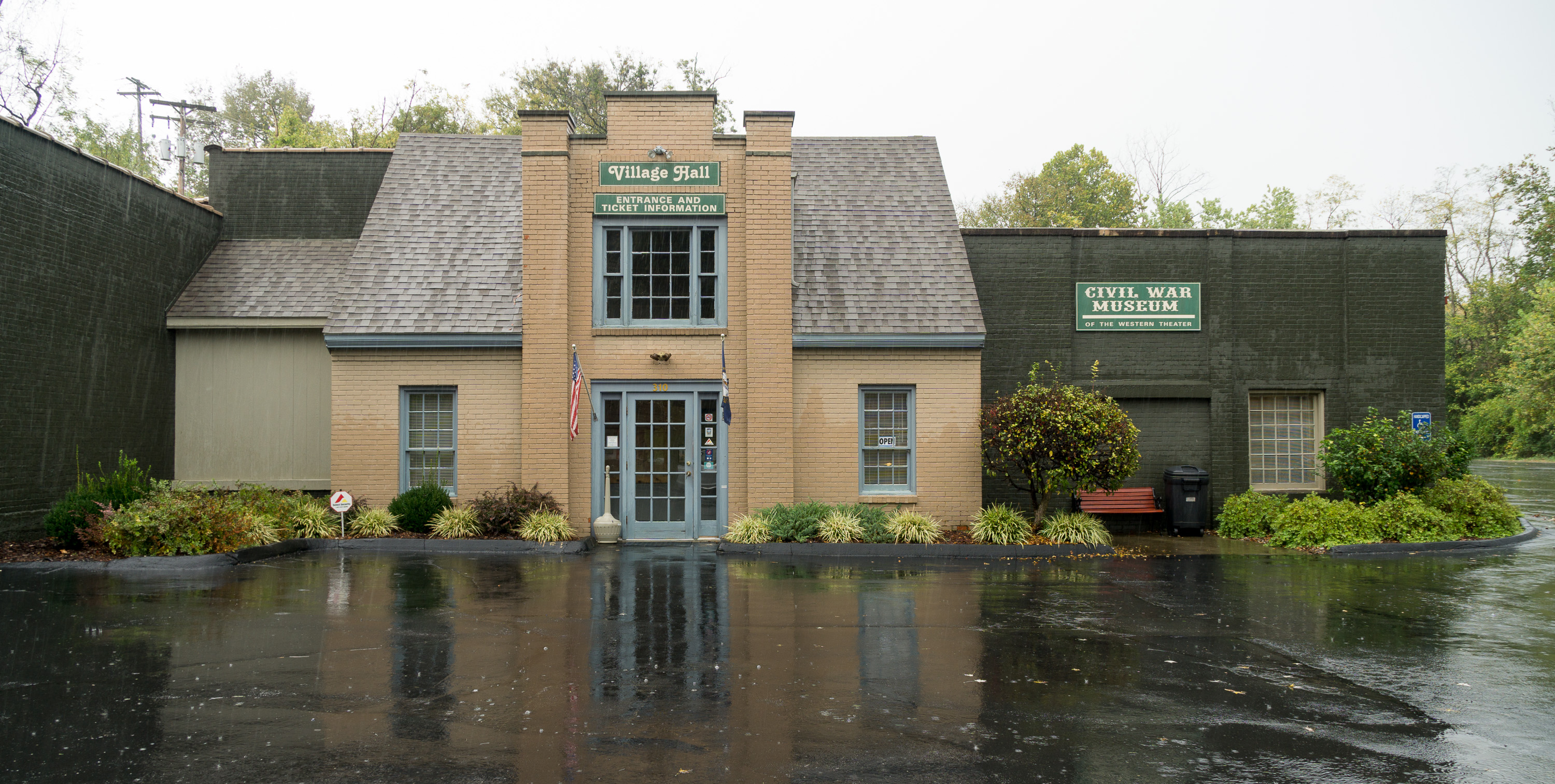
Main Museum

The National Civil War Battles of the Western Theater Museum in Bardstown, Kentucky, is a collection of five attractions along what is called "Museum Row". It was established in 1996 by Dr. Henry Spalding. The leading attraction is The National Civil War Battles of the Western Theater Museum, which is the fourth largest American Civil War museum and is dedicated to the Western Theater of the war. The main building was originally the icehouse and waterworks of Bardstown, and is 8,500 square feet (790 m^{2}).

The four attractions are:

- The National Civil War Museum Battles of the Western Theater: organized by chronology and geography. It is the largest collection of Civil War Artifacts of the Western Theater in America. A notable exhibit is the flag of the 2nd Kentucky Cavalry, which was captured when John Hunt Morgan was captured after his Raid ended in Ohio.
- Old Bardstown Village: Commonly called the "Old Bardstown Village", it features buildings built in Nelson County, Kentucky, from 1776 to 1820.
- Women's Civil War Museum: Opened in 1999, it is the only museum that looks into the role of women during the American Civil War. It is in the historic (c1840) Wright Talbott House.
- Hal Moore Military Museum: Honors those who came from the middle of the United States who fought for freedom from the first Revolutionary War to Operation Desert Storm.
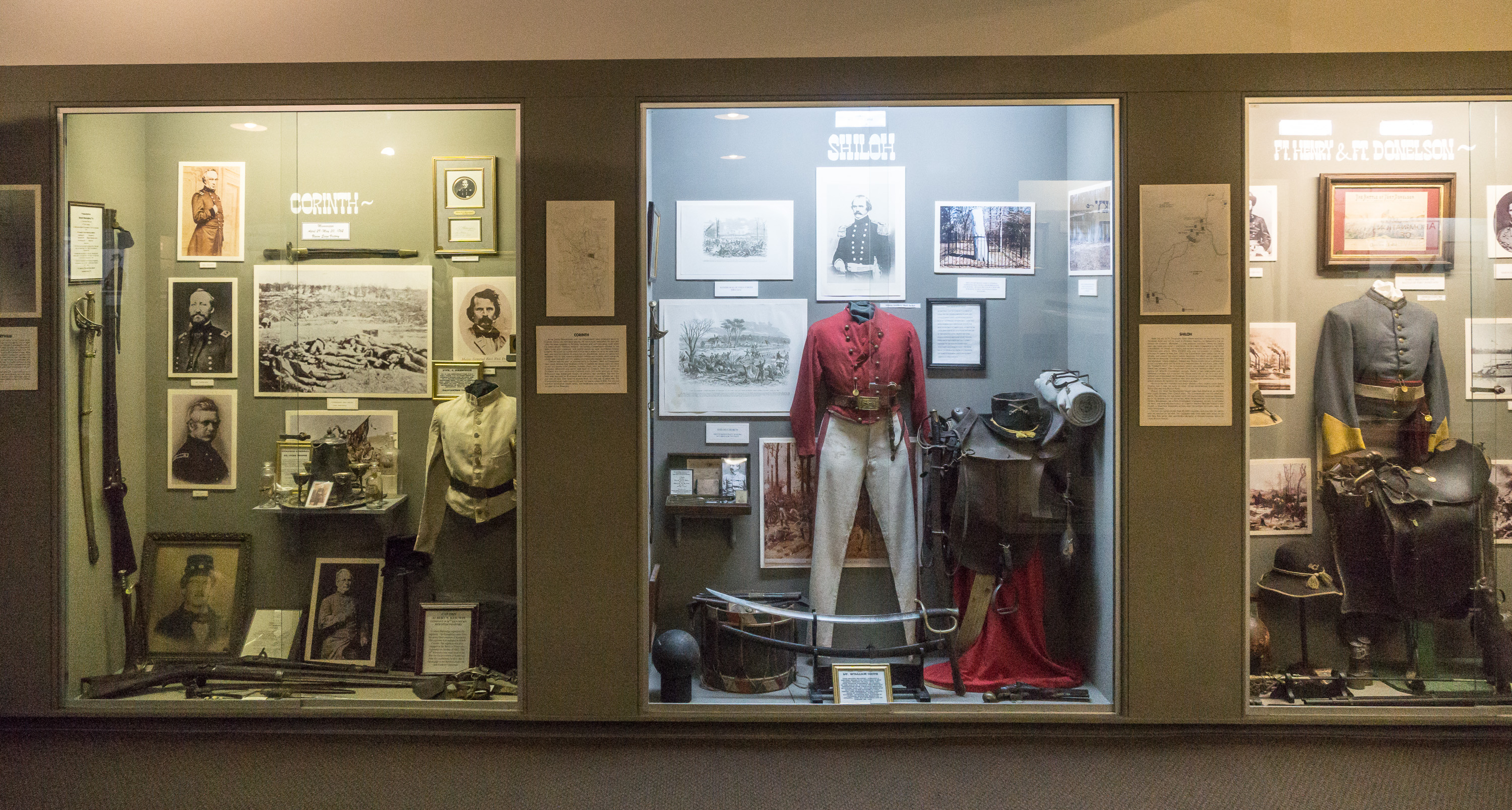
Displays in the Civil War museum

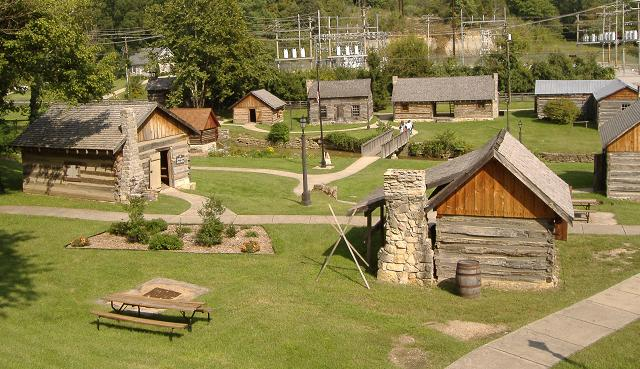
Civil War Village

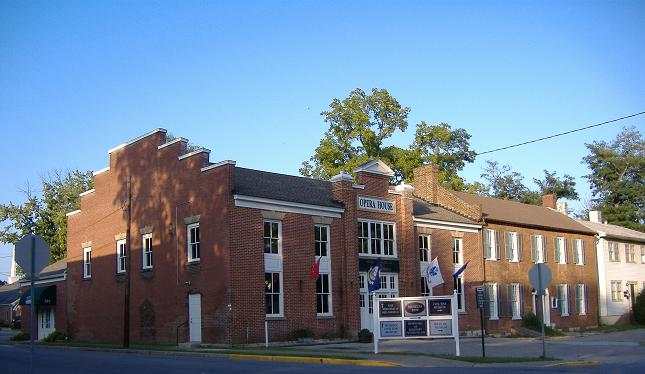
Auxiliary museums

== See also ==
- Kentucky in the American Civil War
- List of attractions and events in the Louisville metropolitan area
