= Monsters Wanted =

- Directed by: Brian Cunningham; Joe Laughrey
- Written by: Brian Cunningham; Joe Laughrey
- Produced by: Brian Cunningham; Joe Laughrey; Kaley Roberts
- Starring: Richard Teachout; Janel Nash; Kenneth Schell
- Edited by: Brian Cunningham; Kaley Roberts
- Production company: ThoughtFly Films
- Release date: July 27, 2013 (FandomFest)
- Running time: 89 minutes
- Country: United States
- Language: English

Monsters Wanted is a 2013 documentary film that was directed by Brian Cunningham and Joe Laughrey. The film marks the directorial debut of Laughrey and is the first feature-length documentary by Cunningham. The film, which explores the haunted house industry in Louisville, Kentucky, had its world premiere on July 27, 2013, at FandomFest in Louisville. The film was also released on DVD and VOD August 27, 2013.

== Plot ==
The documentary follows Rich Teachout, a businessman who has quit his job in order to focus on cultivating a unique haunted attraction. Together with Janel Nash, the two will work on building and operating the Asylum Haunted Scream park during its first year of operation. The documentary also follows other haunted attractions in the Louisville area.

== Reception ==
Critical reception has been positive. Mark L. Miller of Ain't It Cool News wrote that the end seems like "a five minute filler section out of nowhere" but that he "loved almost every second of Monsters Wanted". Culture Crypt gave the film a score of 75, writing, "The story is disjointed at times, and some of the issues are artificially inflated into problems that are resolved quickly. But the film creates a fun portrayal of how disparate personalities with a similar dream find commonality in their passion. And how commitment and community are the key ingredients that bring their unified vision together." Mania.com gave a favorable review, writing, "You can't help but admire the dedication that the entire staff has in the face of all the problems they encounter and days which last 20 hours. Cunningham and Laughrey do a great job of letting the people tell the story as they stay back and just record the drama. For any horror or haunted house them park fan, this is a fascinating look inside the industry."

== Accolades ==
The film won "Best Documentary" at the 2013 Rhode Island International Horror Film Festival, was an official selection at the 2013 Orlando Film Festival, and was the opening night film at the 2014 Transworld Halloween and Attraction Show.
