= International Thomas Merton Society =

The International Thomas Merton Society (ITMS), founded in 1987, is a learned society which studies the works of American Catholic writer and mystic Thomas Merton. It sponsors conferences and co-publishes a journal, The Merton Seasonal. The society and the Thomas Merton Center are located at Bellarmine University in Louisville, Kentucky, U.S. In 2005 the ITMS led a public campaign arguing for Merton to front the most recent edition of the Vatican-published U.S. Catholic Catechism for Adults, arguing that he was a more worthy recipient of the honor than Elizabeth Ann Seton, whose biography was eventually selected to open the book.
