= Bardstown Historical Museum =

Coordinates: 37.8114°N 85.4711°W

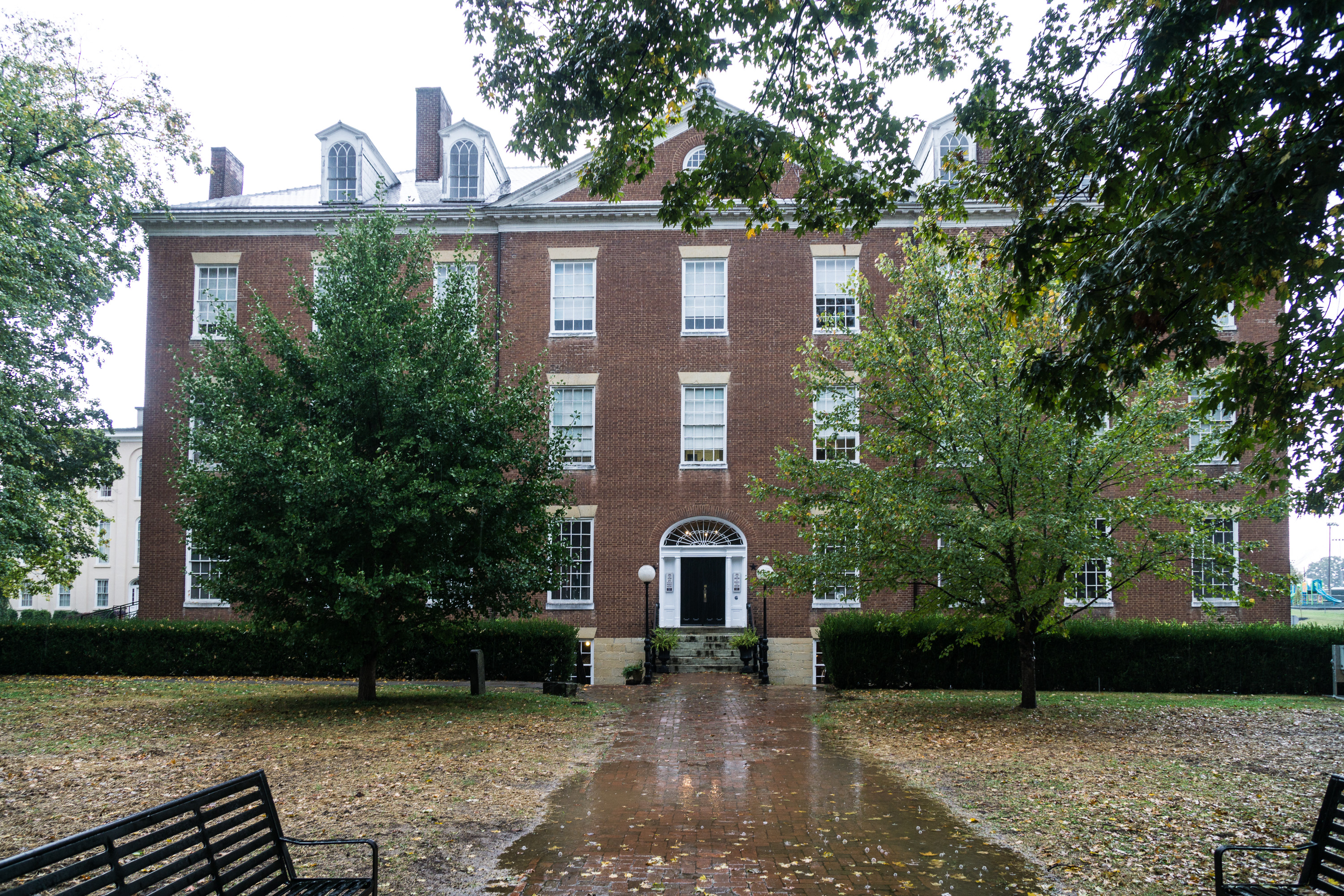
Spalding Hall

The Bardstown Historical Museum is a museum of local history in Bardstown, Kentucky, USA, that is located in Spalding Hall, along with the Oscar Getz Museum of Whiskey History.

The exhibits at Bardstown Historical Museum include Native American and American Civil War clothing, weapons and artifacts, items from St. Joseph Preparatory School, Stephen Foster memorabilia, an exhibit about Trappist monks, and other local historic cultural items, documents and photographs. The museum also features a large collection of American silver dating from 1860 to 1990.

== See also ==
- List of attractions and events in the Louisville metropolitan area
