= Whitney Young Birthplace and Museum =

Historic house in Kentucky, United States

- Whitney M. Young, Jr. Birthplace
- U.S. National Register of Historic Places
- U.S. National Historic Landmark
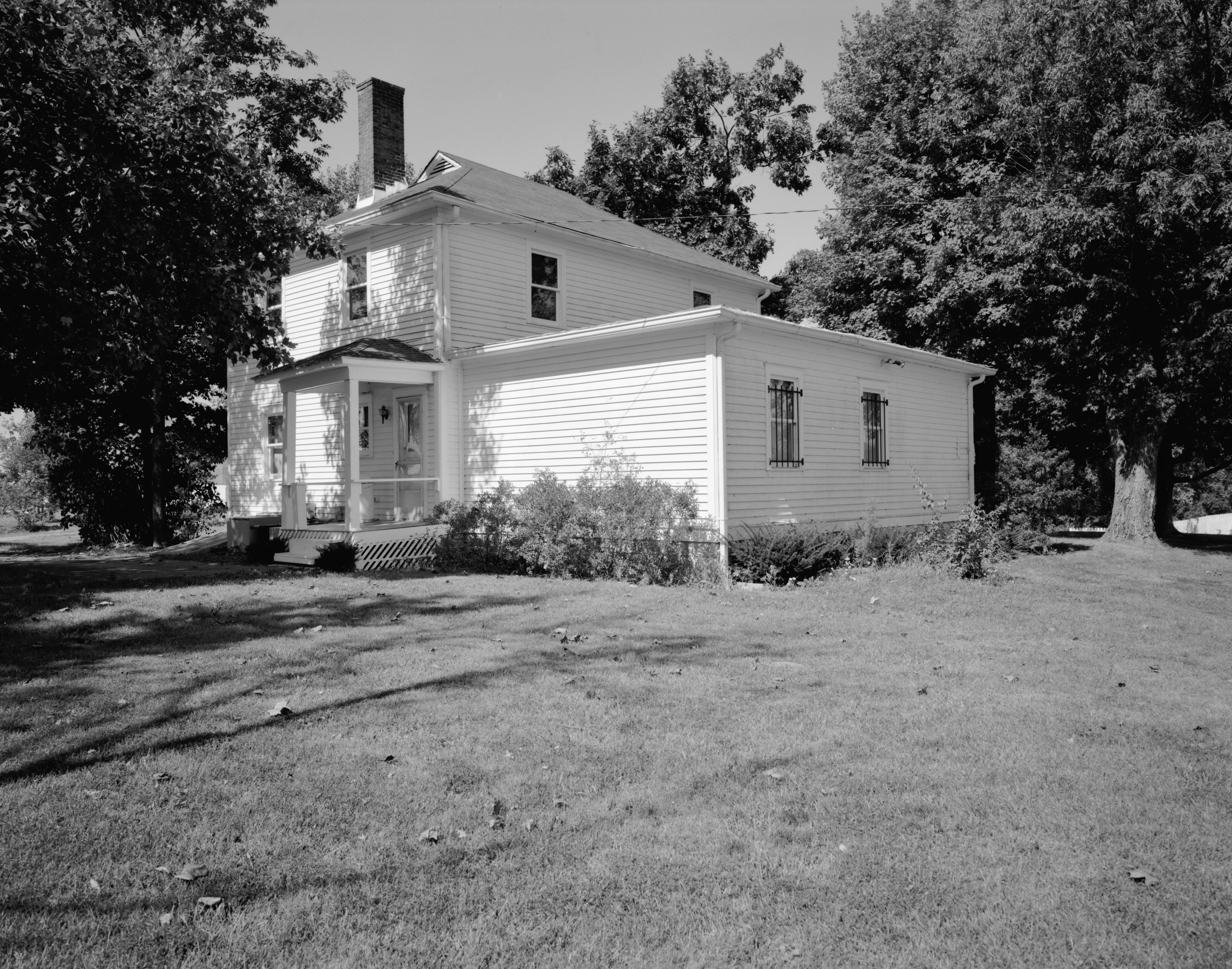
- Side of the house

- Location within Kentucky Location within the United States
- Nearest city: Simpsonville, Kentucky
- Coordinates: 38°13′21.6″N 85°22′20″W
- Area: less than one acre
- Built: 1921
- NRHP reference No.: 72000543

Significant dates
- Added to NRHP: October 18, 1972
- Designated NHL: April 27, 1984

The Whitney Young Birthplace and Museum is a historic house museum on the campus of the former Lincoln Institute in rural Shelby County, Kentucky, near Shelbyville. It was the birthplace and childhood home of Whitney M. Young Jr. (1921–71), an American civil rights leader. Young became prominent for his leadership of the National Urban League between 1961 and 1971. The house is now managed by the Lincoln Foundation, a successor to the Lincoln Institute, as a museum to its and Young's history. The house appears on the National Register of Historic Places and was designated as a National Historic Landmark in 1984.

== Description and history ==
The Lincoln Institute was founded by Berea College in 1912 after Kentucky passed legislation forbidding mixed-race colleges and operated until 1966. The Whitney Young Birthplace stands on its former campus, south of United States Route 60 west of Shelbyville. It is a modest two-story wood-frame structure with a clapboarded exterior and hip roof. A porch extends across the front, supported by stuccoed square columns.

Young was born in the house in 1921 and lived there through his high school years. Particularly in his role as leader of the National Urban League (1961–71), Young was influential in improving conditions for African Americans with respect to housing, education, and employment opportunity. Young's birthplace and childhood home remained the property of the Lincoln Institute, and its successor, the Lincoln Foundation. After Young's death in 1971, the house was dedicated as a shrine to his memory. Today, numerous photographs, articles, and other items related to Young and the Lincoln Institute are on display inside the house.

The house is now a museum, accessed through the Whitney M. Young Jr. Jobs Corps Center, a unit of the United States Department of Labor.

== See also ==
- List of attractions and events in the Louisville metropolitan area
- National Register of Historic Places listings in Shelby County, Kentucky
