= Patriots Peace Memorial =

Coordinates: 38°17′19″N 85°40′58″W

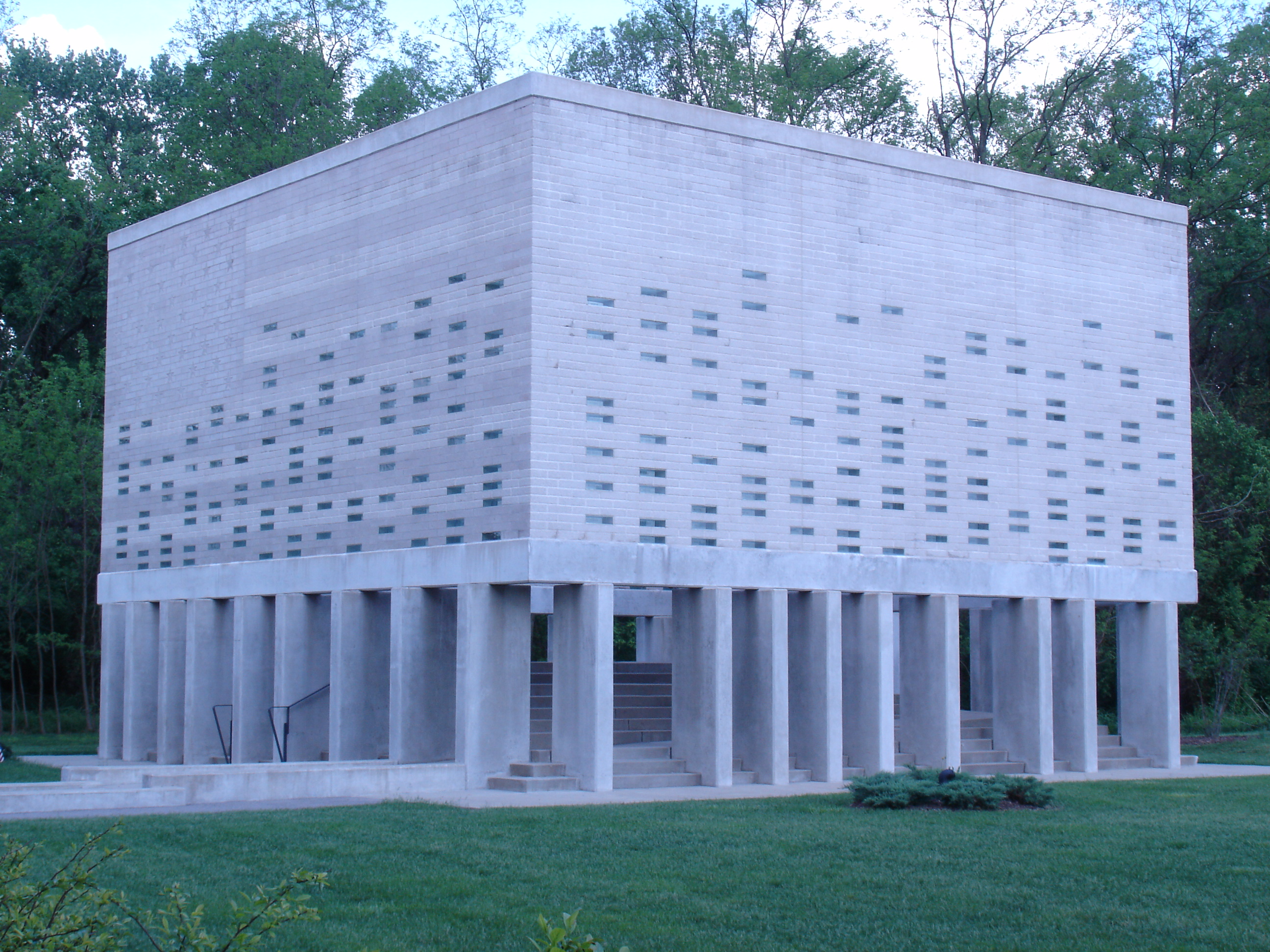
Patriots Peace Memorial in Louisville, Kentucky

Patriots Peace Memorial is a monument in eastern Louisville, Kentucky near the banks of the Ohio River. In 2000, County Judge-Executive Rebecca Jackson appointed a committee of local retired and former military personnel, as well as family members of local United States military personnel, to visualize, conceive, fund and erect a suitable memorial honoring fallen patriots from all the military services. With the generous financial support of David and Betty Jones, as well as numerous local foundations, corporations, veterans' organizations, families, friends and patriotic citizens, the dream became a reality on Veterans Day, November 11, 2002.

An international design competition was held and received over 120 entries. The winning design was by David D. Quillin Architecture, a small architecture firm located in Berlin, Maryland. The monument includes an elevated, 4-sided structure with brick walls. Each time a new fallen patriot is inscribed, a brick is removed from the wall and replaced with a personalized etched glass identifying each patriot, signifying our loss. This void in an otherwise solid wall becomes a portal of light transforming the interior by day and radiating outward at night through each name as a reminder to celebrate daily the joy of freedom purchased and safeguarded by these brave men and women. When a visitor walks under the four walls and ascends the pyramidical steps, the walls visually descend until, once at the topmost viewing pad, the busy park and highway nearby are obscured.

Ever mindful that military readiness is a dangerous endeavor, as of 2007, this community has now enshrined 421 patriots in this memorial.

The memorial honors fallen patriots from all services of the armed forces who died during honorable service in the line of duty, under conditions other than those of declared hostile action.

The emphasis has been to find and honor veterans with local ties, who have died in service after the Vietnam War. There is a memorial service at the site for honorees annually at noon on Memorial Day.

Official documentation is required from the member's service to certify that a potential honoree was serving honorably at the time of his or her death and that it was not a result of misconduct or through some circumstance caused by the service member. The death may have occurred during regular off-duty time or official leave. In the case of Reservists and National Guard personnel, the death may have occurred while traveling to or from official duty or during any period of time while the service member was in a paid status.

Despite its unique design incorporating an etched relief of an American flag on its north wall, the memorial lacked an actual American flag flying in silent tribute to those enshrined therein. On Memorial Day, May 29, 2006, during the annual memorial service, an American flag was solemnly raised in an enduring tribute to those honored by the memorial.

== See also ==
- List of attractions and events in the Louisville metropolitan area
