= Muhammad Ali Center =

Non-profit organization in the USA

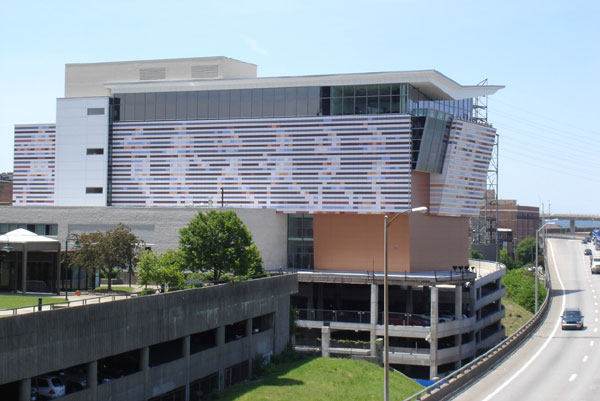
- The Ali Center, alongside I-64 on Louisville's riverfront
- Established: November 19, 2005; 20 years ago
- Location: 144 N. Sixth Street; Louisville, Kentucky, U.S.
- Coordinates: 38°15′29.4″N 85°45′36.2″W
- Type: Biographical, boxing
- Founders: Muhammad Ali; Lonnie Ali
- President: Lonnie Ali
- Website: alicenter.org

The Muhammad Ali Center is a non-profit museum and cultural center dedicated to boxer Muhammad Ali in Louisville, Kentucky, United States. Ali, a native of Louisville, and his wife Lonnie Ali founded the museum in 2005.

The six-story, 96,750 sq ft (8,988 m^{2}) museum is located in the city's West Main District. It opened on November 19, 2005, at a cost of $80 million. It also includes a 40,000 sq ft (3,700 m^{2}) two-level amphitheater and plaza.

On April 4, 2013, a new pedestrian bridge opened, helping residents and visitors connect from the Muhammad Ali Center's plaza to the Belvedere, the Waterfront, and other downtown attractions. The 170-foot-long walkway is nine feet wide, with exterior metal panels that complement the Ali Center plaza's design.

== History ==
In 2020, the Muhammad Ali Center in Louisville and the SEEK Museum in Russellville were added to the U.S. Civil Rights Trail.

== Description ==
The cultural center features exhibitions regarding Ali's six core principles of confidence, conviction, dedication, giving, respect, and spirituality. Throughout his life, Muhammad Ali strived to be guided by these core principles in his quest to inspire people around the world, dedicating himself to helping others, being the best athlete he could be and by standing up for what he believed in.

An orientation theater helps present Ali's life. A mock boxing ring is recreated based on his Deer Lake Training Camp. A two-level pavilion, housed within a large elliptical room, features Ali's boxing memorabilia and history. A large projector displays the film The Greatest onto a full-sized boxing ring. There are also booths where visitors can view clips of Ali's greatest fights on video-on-demand terminals, which also feature pre- and post-fight interviews.

Two art galleries, the LeRoy Neiman Gallery and the Howard L. Bingham Gallery, feature rotating exhibits that are located on the third floor.

== Gallery ==
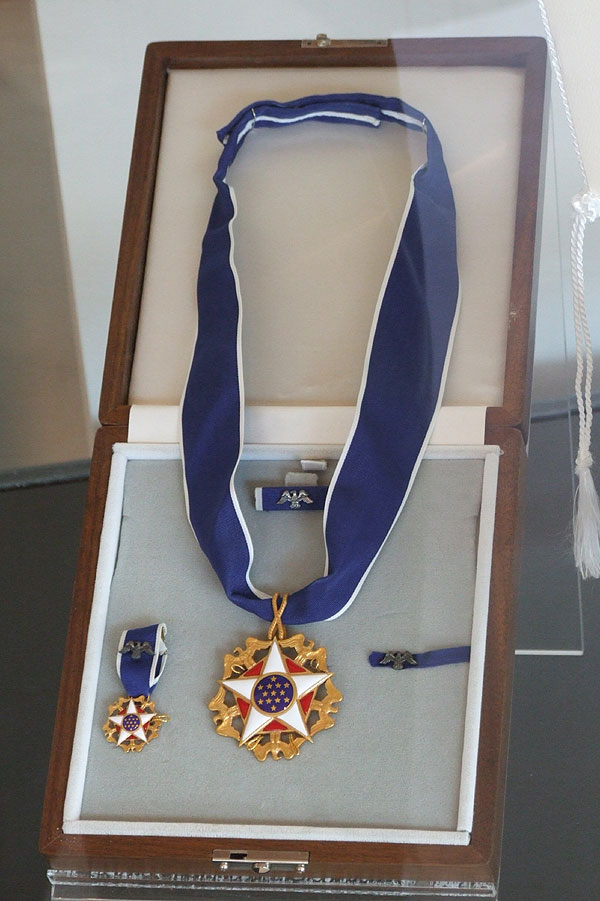
Ali's Presidential Medal of Freedom on display

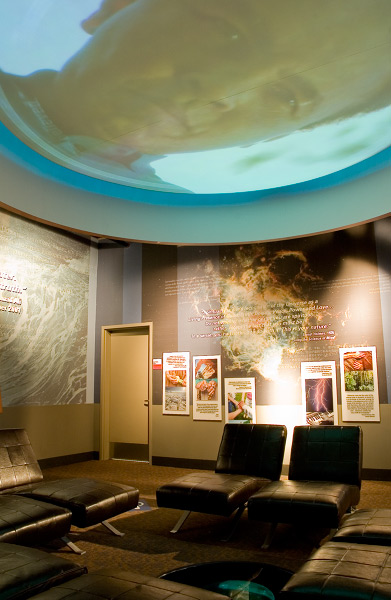

== See also ==
- List of attractions and events in the Louisville metropolitan area
- List of museums focused on African Americans
- List of museums in the Louisville metropolitan area
