= Thomas Merton Center (Louisville) =

The Thomas Merton Center is the home of the largest collection of the works of Thomas Merton, a Trappist monk of the Abbey of Gethsemani. It is located on the second floor of the W.L. Lyons Brown Library at Bellarmine University in Louisville, Kentucky, United States.

While the Thomas Merton Center at Bellarmine is not the only facility with this name, it is the official home of the Thomas Merton Collection. The roots of the center lie in the Merton Legacy Trust, established by Merton in 1967, one year before his death. In the trust, he named the then-Bellarmine College as the repository of his works. The center was established in 1969 by the school. The center is an international resource for scholarship on Merton and his beliefs, including social justice, ecumenism, spirituality and peace. The resources of the Thomas Merton Center has provided source material for numerous academic writings on these topics and Thomas Merton himself, and it regularly hosts and sponsors related events for scholars, students and the general public.

The center works in conjunction with the International Thomas Merton Society in the publication of the quarterly Merton Seasonal and the Merton Annual. The center is also the central office for the Society, founded in 1987.

== See also ==
- List of attractions and events in the Louisville metropolitan area
- List of museums in the Louisville metropolitan area
