= Spalding Hall =

- U.S. National Register of Historic Places
- U.S. Historic district – Contributing property
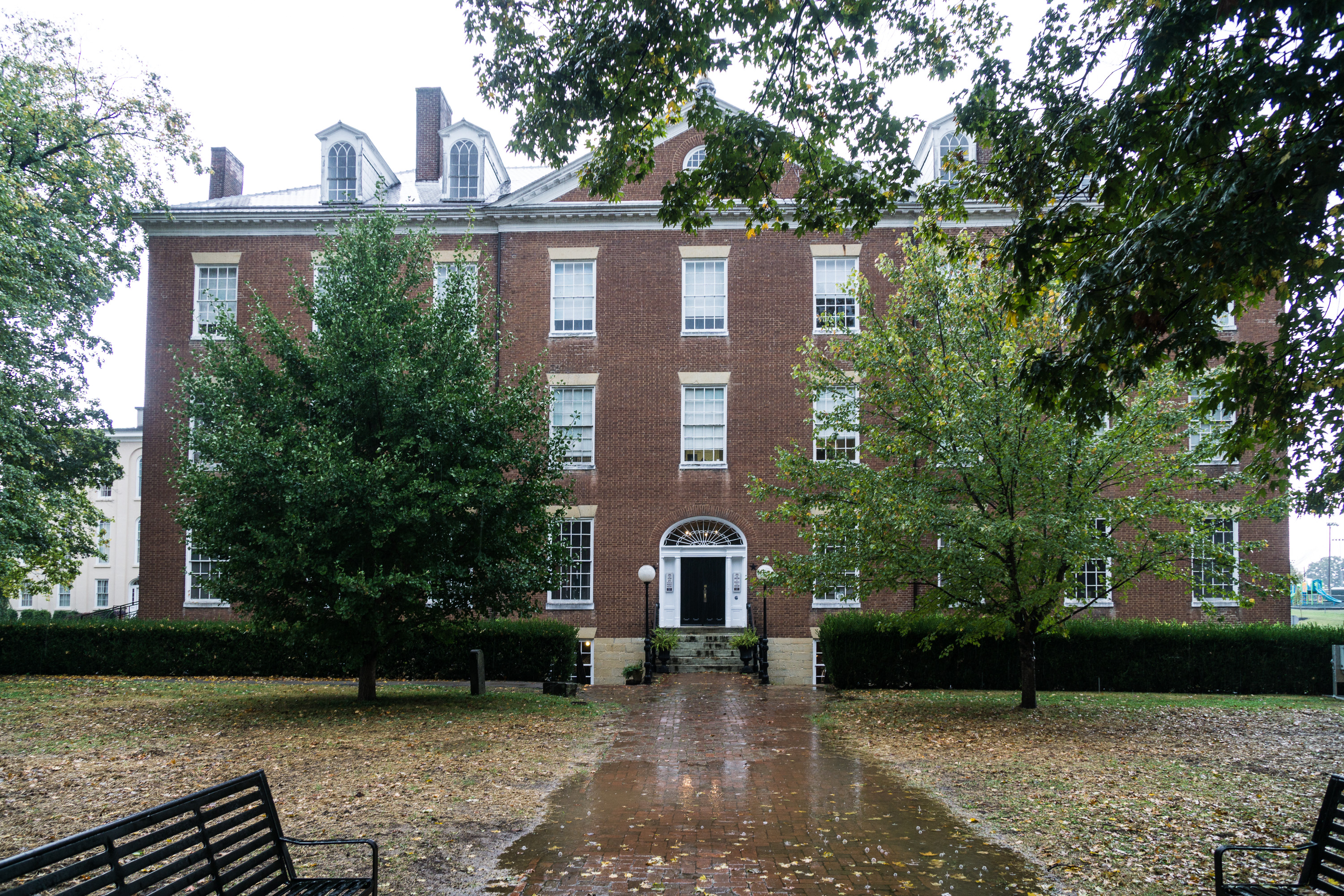
- Main façade of Spalding Hall
- Location: North 5th Street, Bardstown, Kentucky
- Coordinates: 37°48′40.84″N 85°28′16.12″W
- Built: 1839
- Architectural style: Federal
- Part of: Bardstown Historic District (ID83002837)
- NRHP reference No.: 73000823

Significant dates
- Added to NRHP: May 7, 1973
- Designated CP: February 17, 1983

Spalding Hall is a building listed on the National Register of Historic Places in Bardstown, Kentucky. It was built in conjunction with the Basilica of St. Joseph Proto-Cathedral. The hall was originally built in 1826 and named for Bishop Martin John Spalding.

It was the main building of St. Joseph's College, a Catholic college in the 19th century, which was the first Catholic college in Kentucky. The current building was built in 1839 to replace the previous building, which had been destroyed in a fire. The college was closed during the American Civil War and the building briefly served as a hospital for Union soldiers.

It served as St. Joseph's Preparatory School from about 1911 until 1968.

The building houses the Oscar Getz Museum of Whiskey History and the Bardstown Historical Museum.

== See also ==
- List of attractions and events in the Louisville metropolitan area
- National Register of Historic Places listings in Nelson County, Kentucky
