= Oscar Getz Museum of Whiskey History =

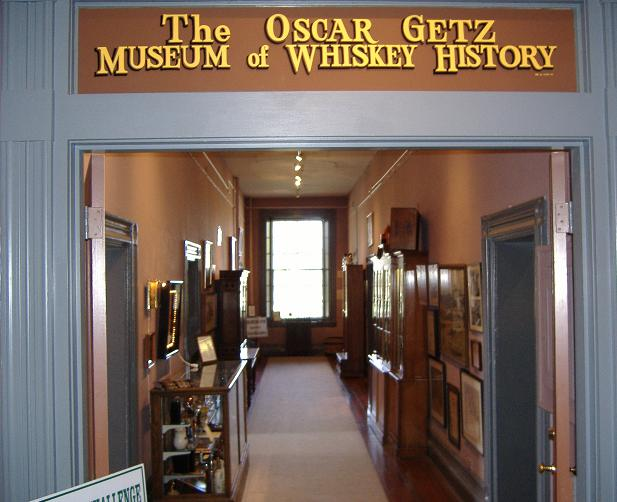
- Established: 1984
- Location: Bardstown, Kentucky, U.S.
- Coordinates: 37.8113°N 85.4710°W
- Type: History museum
- Collections: Artifacts related to American whiskey history
- Executive director: Jack Rein

The Oscar Getz Museum of Bourbon History is a museum in Bardstown, Kentucky, that chronicles the history of American whiskey from Colonial days through the 1960s. Located in Spalding Hall, built in 1826 and registered with the National Historic Registry, the museum harbors one of the finest collections of Bourbon, Whiskey and Whiskey Artifacts in the world. They include Abraham Lincoln's liquor license, advertising posters, prescriptions for the medicinal use of alcohol during National Prohibition, whiskey bottles, and other artifacts, including several moonshine stills and a still that quite possibly belonged to George Washington.The museum has a collection of over 3600 bottles and includes extremely rare one-of-a-kind bourbons and whiskeys. The museum also features the Bardstown Historical Museum, a collection of artifacts and personalities from 1785 Colonial Kentucky through the Civil War to the present day

The museum is part of the American Whiskey Trail.

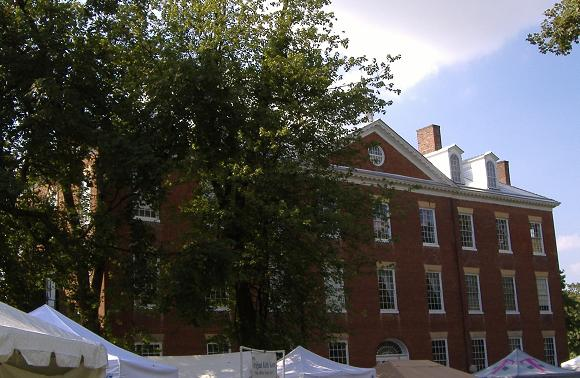
Spalding Hall, which houses the Getz Museum

== See also ==
- List of attractions and events in the Louisville metropolitan area
