= National Register of Historic Places listings in Old Louisville, Kentucky =

This is a list of properties and historic districts on the National Register of Historic Places in Old Louisville, Kentucky (roughly bounded by York St. and E. Jacob St. on the north; S. Floyd St. and I-65 on the east; E. Brandeis St. on the south; and S. 5th St., S. 7th St. and the CSX Railroad tracks on the west). Latitude and longitude coordinates of the 33 sites listed on this page may be displayed in a map or exported in several formats by clicking on one of the links in the adjacent box.

National Register sites elsewhere in Jefferson County are listed separately.

This National Park Service list is complete through NPS recent listings posted October 16, 2026.

== Current listings ==
	Name on the Register	Image	Date listed	Location	Description
1	Adath Israel Temple	Adath Israel Temple	December 31, 1974 (#74000882)	834 S. 3rd St. 38°14′35″N 85°45′27″W	
2	Bayly-Schroering House	Bayly-Schroering House	November 14, 1978 (#78001345)	1012 S. 4th St. 38°14′18″N 85°45′37″W	
3	Board of Extension of the Methodist Episcopal Church, South	Board of Extension of the Methodist Episcopal Church, South	June 3, 1983 (#83002636)	1115 S. 4th St. 38°14′12″N 85°45′33″W	
4	Calvary Episcopal Church	Calvary Episcopal Church	January 18, 1978 (#78001347)	821 S. 4th St. 38°14′36″N 85°45′31″W	
5	Church of the Messiah	Church of the Messiah	April 21, 1976 (#76000903)	805 S. 4th St. 38°14′38″N 85°45′30″W	
6	College Street Presbyterian Church	College Street Presbyterian Church	November 29, 1978 (#78001350)	113 W. College St. 38°14′36″N 85°45′17″W	
7	Theophilus T. Conrad House-Rose Anna Hughes Presbyterian Widows Home	Theophilus T. Conrad House-Rose Anna Hughes Presbyterian Widows Home	June 9, 2021 (#100006661)	1402 St. James Ct. 38°13′45″N 85°45′48″W	
8	Cornwall and Brown Houses	Cornwall and Brown Houses	July 19, 1978 (#78001351)	957 S. 4th St. 38°14′23″N 85°45′33″W	
9	District #1	District #1	June 3, 1983 (#83002655)	S. Brook and E. Breckinridge St. 38°14′29″N 85°45′05″W	
10	District #2	District #2	June 3, 1983 (#83002656)	W. Breckinridge St. and S. 2nd St. 38°14′31″N 85°45′22″W	
11	William J. Dodd Residence	William J. Dodd Residence	August 5, 2010 (#10000530)	1448 St. James Court; 38°13′39″N 85°45′50″W	
12	D.H. Ewing & Sons Creamery	D.H. Ewing & Sons Creamery	June 3, 1983 (#83002662)	981 S. 3rd St. 38°14′20″N 85°45′28″W	
13	The Filson Club	The Filson Club	June 20, 2013 (#13000476)	118 W. Breckinridge St. 38°14′28″N 85°45′19″W	
14	First Christian Church	First Christian Church	July 16, 1979 (#79001005)	850 S. 4th St. 38°14′32″N 85°45′34″W	
15	First Street District	First Street District	July 14, 1984 (#84001555)	Roughly bounded by E. Breckinridge, E. Kentucky, and Interstate 65; 38°14′26″N 85°45′15″W	
16	Fourth Avenue Methodist Episcopal Church	Fourth Avenue Methodist Episcopal Church	July 16, 1979 (#79001006)	318 W. St. Catherine St. 38°14′14″N 85°45′35″W	
17	Harig, Koop & Company-Columbia Mantel Company	Harig, Koop & Company-Columbia Mantel Company	March 14, 1996 (#96000279)	845 S. 9th St. 38°14′36″N 85°46′01″W	No longer extant.
18	Jewish Hospital Complex	Jewish Hospital Complex	July 22, 1994 (#94000732)	236 E. Kentucky St. 38°14′16″N 85°45′05″W	
19	Kentucky Street School	Kentucky Street School	June 3, 1983 (#83002691)	119 E. Kentucky St. 38°14′19″N 85°45′13″W	
20	Landward House	Landward House	September 20, 1973 (#73000809)	1385-1387 S. 4th St. 38°13′46″N 85°45′39″W	
21	Louisville Gas and Electric Company Service Station Complex	Louisville Gas and Electric Company Service Station Complex	March 17, 2015 (#15000082)	1228 S. 7th St. 38°14′03″N 85°45′56″W	
22	Louisville Male High School	Louisville Male High School	April 18, 1979 (#79001011)	911 S. Brook St. 38°14′26″N 85°45′08″W	
23	Louisville War Memorial Auditorium	Louisville War Memorial Auditorium	December 27, 1977 (#77000625)	970 S. 4th St. 38°14′22″N 85°45′36″W	
24	Dr. J.B. Marvin House	Dr. J.B. Marvin House	June 3, 1983 (#83002700)	809 S. 4th St. 38°14′38″N 85°45′31″W	
25	Nugent House		July 1, 2020 (#100005342)	845 South 6th St. 38°14′35″N 85°45′44″W	
26	Old Louisville Residential District	Old Louisville Residential District	February 7, 1975 (#75000772)	Irregular pattern roughly bounded by S. 7th St. on the west, North-South Expressway (Interstate 65) on the east, Kentucky St. on the north, and Avery St. on the south; also roughly bounded by Interstate 65 and 7th, Kentucky, and Avery Sts. 38°13′46″N 85°45′33″W	Second set of boundaries represents a boundary increase of July 12, 1984
27	The Olympic	The Olympic	July 9, 2007 (#07000677)	223 W. Breckinridge St. 38°14′31″N 85°45′26″W	
28	Porter–Todd House	Porter–Todd House	April 30, 1979 (#79001013)	929 S. 4th St. 38°14′24″N 85°45′33″W	
29	Presentation Academy	Presentation Academy	December 22, 1978 (#78001364)	861 S. 4th St. 38°14′32″N 85°45′32″W	
30	Puritan Apartment Hotel	Puritan Apartment Hotel	February 28, 2019 (#100003475)	1244 S. Fourth St. 38°14′02″N 85°45′38″W	
31	Rauchfuss Houses	Rauchfuss Houses	August 12, 1982 (#82002716)	837-847 S. Brook St. 38°14′29″N 85°45′08″W	
32	St. James–Belgravia Historic District	St. James–Belgravia Historic District	December 5, 1972 (#72000538)	Roughly bounded by Central Park, S. 4th, S. 6th, and Hill Sts. 38°13′40″N 85°45′48″W	
33	Steam Engine Company No. 7	Steam Engine Company No. 7	November 7, 1980 (#80001631)	821 S. 6th St. 38°14′38″N 85°45′43″W	
34	Thierman Apartments	Thierman Apartments	June 3, 1983 (#83002740)	416-420 W. Breckinridge St. 38°14′30″N 85°45′36″W	
35	Tompkins-Buchanan House	Tompkins-Buchanan House	April 27, 1977 (#77000628)	851 S. 4th St. 38°14′33″N 85°45′32″W	

== See also ==
- National Register of Historic Places listings in Jefferson County, Kentucky
- List of National Historic Landmarks in Kentucky
- List of attractions and events in the Louisville metropolitan area
