= Cherokee Triangle, Louisville =

Coordinates: 38.23526857°N 85.71244061°W

- Cherokee Triangle Area Residential District
- U.S. National Register of Historic Places
- U.S. Historic district
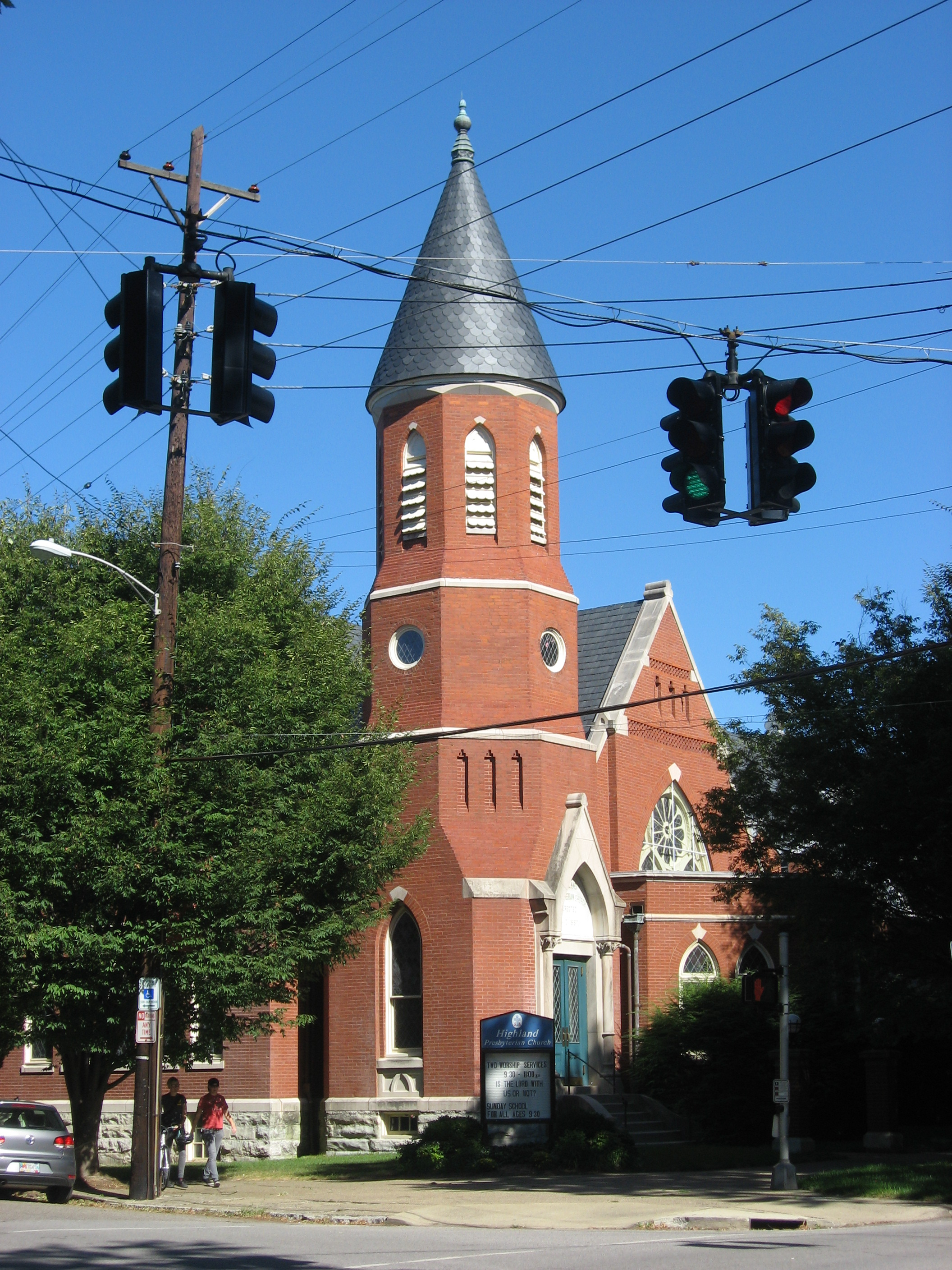
- Highland Presbyterian Church, built in 1888, is a fixture in the Cherokee Triangle neighborhood.

- Location within Kentucky Location within the United States
- Location: Roughly bounded by Bardstown Rd., Sherwood Rd., Broadway, E to jct. of Grinstead Dr. and Cherokee Pkwy., Louisville, Kentucky
- Area: 500 acres (200 ha)
- Built: 1882
- Architect: Multiple
- Architectural style: Late 19th And 20th Century Revivals, Late 19th And Early 20th Century American Movements, Late Victorian
- Website: cherokeetriangle.com
- NRHP reference No.: 76000902
- Added to NRHP: June 30, 1976

The Cherokee Triangle is a historic neighborhood in Louisville, Kentucky, USA, known for its large homes displaying an eclectic mix of architectural styles. Its boundaries are Bardstown Road to the southwest, Cherokee Park and Eastern Parkway to the southeast, and Cave Hill Cemetery to the north, and is considered a part of a larger area of Louisville called The Highlands. It is named for nearby Cherokee Park, a 409 acres (1.7 km^{2}) park designed by Frederick Law Olmsted, the designer of New York's Central Park.

== History ==
The land was part of a 6,000-acre (24 km^{2}) military land grant in 1779 to Southall and Charlton, and changed hands numerous times between then and 1863, when most of the land that is today's neighborhood was purchased by George Douglass. His home was located at the corner of Dearing Court (formerly Douglass Place) and Dudley Avenue, and is now included in the grounds of Cave Hill. In 1869, he sold 125 acres (0.5 km^{2}) to realtors James W. Henning and Josiah S. Speed for $135,000.

The largest portion of Cherokee Triangle was developed by Henning and Speed in the 1880s, as an early streetcar suburb of Louisville. While the two were long-time developers, they had plans to establish residences for themselves there and develop the neighborhood as "the best possible environment of suburban living." They laid out the first subdivision, the Highland Addition, in 1870, containing just 150 lots, with an average size of 60 by 180 feet. The first house in the neighborhood, located at the corner of Transit Avenue (now Grinstead Drive) and New Broadway (now Cherokee Road), was completed in 1871 as a wedding present for Henning's daughter.

Henning and Speed sold lots briskly for an average of $1,200 each, between 1870 and 1873, but development virtually halted in Cherokee Triangle and everywhere else after an economic depression known as the Panic of 1873. Development was slow until 1883, when the opening of Louisville's Southern Exposition, which had the greatest impact on Old Louisville, stimulated the real estate market in the Highlands. Clayton Longest subdivided his property in 1884. But prices for lots were still relatively low.

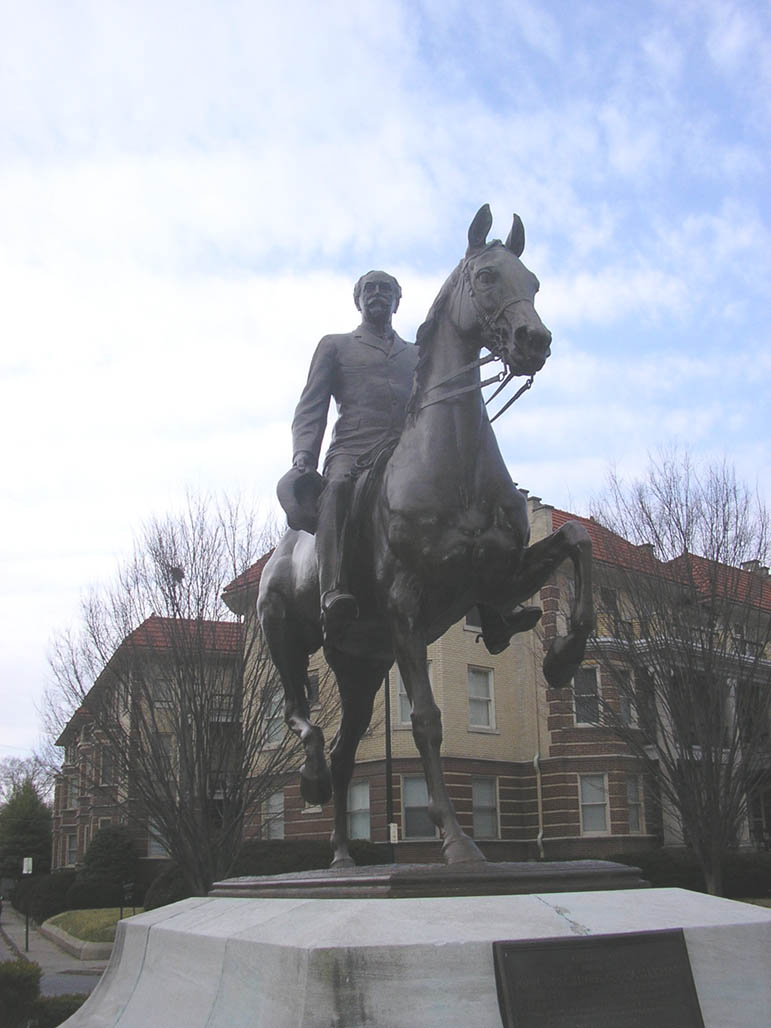
John Castleman Statue, a neighborhood landmark before removal in 2020

After the opening of Cherokee Park in 1891, The area quickly became a popular site for affluent families to build homes, and the Baringer Farms subdivision, as well as the rest of the undeveloped land in the area, was soon developed.

Much of Cherokee Triangle was originally part of a city called Enterprise, which had incorporated in 1884 for tax reasons and to keep liquor sales out of the community. Enterprise had a school, which is now Bloom Elementary. The city was annexed by Louisville in 1896.

Many wealthy residents left for new suburbs after World War II, and as was typical of older affluent neighborhoods such as Old Louisville, large multi-story buildings were split up into apartments. The Cherokee Triangle Association formed in 1962, and new rules and down-zoning slowed the trend. It was designated a preservation district in 1975, with suburban-style zoning restrictions, partially to prevent developments such as modern apartment complexes that were seen as out of place. Largely as a result of the preservation district status, the neighborhood has undergone a period of sustained gentrification and enjoyed the greatest appreciation in property values in the city over the past decade.

The Aquarius Apartments on Cherokee Road, the construction of which was a major factor in establishing the preservation district, was cited as an example of an "incompatible intrusion". As a sign of how the neighborhood has appreciated in recent years, the property was recently purchased by a developer who submitted a controversial plan to raze the apartments and build a 29-unit luxury condominium building on the site. Though his proposal was rejected by the local Architectural Review Committee due to its size, it is reflective of the increased attractiveness of the neighborhood.

The neighborhood is known for its annual art fair, which occurs over a weekend in late April, one week before the Kentucky Derby. A local landmark was a statue of General John Breckinridge Castleman, dedicated in 1913, and supposedly the only equestrian statue in the world for which the horse posed also. The statue was removed on June 8, 2020.

== Demographics ==
As of 2000, the population of Cherokee Triangle was 4,290, of which 94.1% are white, 2.2% are listed as other, 2% are Hispanic, and 1.7% are black. College graduates are 51.8% of the population, people w/o a high school degree are 5.9%. Females outnumber males 50.2% to 49.8%.

== See also ==
- Episcopal Church of the Advent (Louisville, Kentucky)
- Old Louisville
- West Main District, Louisville
- List of attractions and events in the Louisville metropolitan area
