= Calvary Episcopal Church (Louisville, Kentucky) =

- U.S. National Register of Historic Places
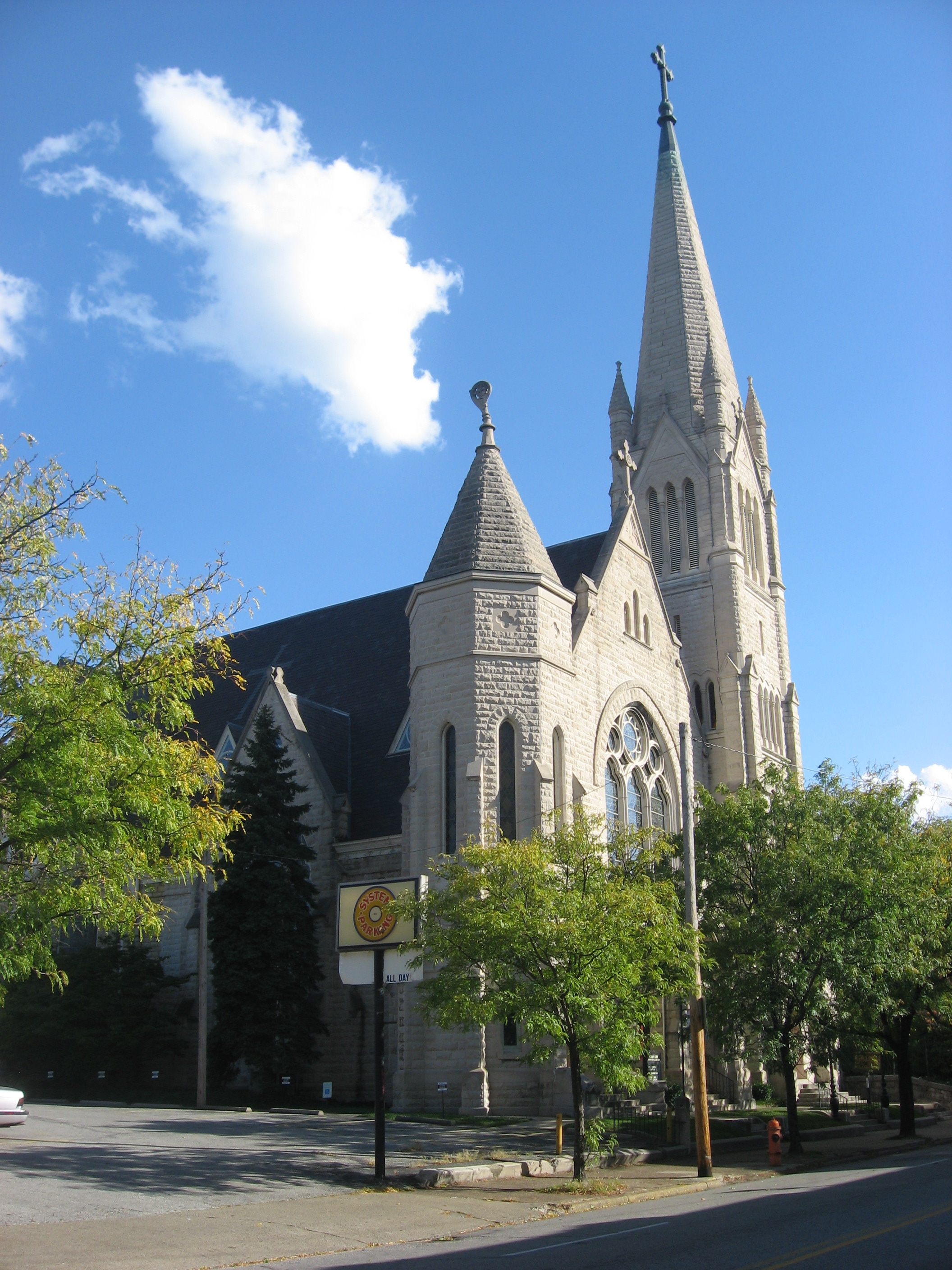
- Front of the church

- Location within Kentucky Location within the United States
- Location: Louisville, Kentucky
- Coordinates: 38°14′35″N 85°45′31″W
- Built: 1876
- Architect: Redin, W.H.; McDonald, Henry P.
- Architectural style: Gothic
- NRHP reference No.: 78001347
- Added to NRHP: January 18, 1978

The historic Calvary Episcopal Church was established in 1857 and is located at 821 South 4th Street Louisville, Kentucky. This stone gothic church was built in Old Louisville in 1888 and is listed on the National Register of Historic Places. The church is a member parish of the Episcopal Diocese of Kentucky.

It has a Latin Cross plan. The NRHP nomination document describes its front as:

The main facade consists of a central gable pierced by a massive equilateral arch window, and two flanking towers of differing shapes and heights. These elements of the exterior announce the three-part division of the interior. A modest porte-cochere is attached to the square tower at the southwest corner where a spire achieves a height of 250 feet. The entrance occupies a centered position, and its arched portion is enveloped by a rather plain accolade, as is the entrance to the square tower.

== See also ==
- National Register of Historic Places listings in Old Louisville, Kentucky
