= Old Louisville =

Coordinates: 38.22995°N 85.76297°W

- Old Louisville Residential District
- U.S. National Register of Historic Places
- U.S. Historic district
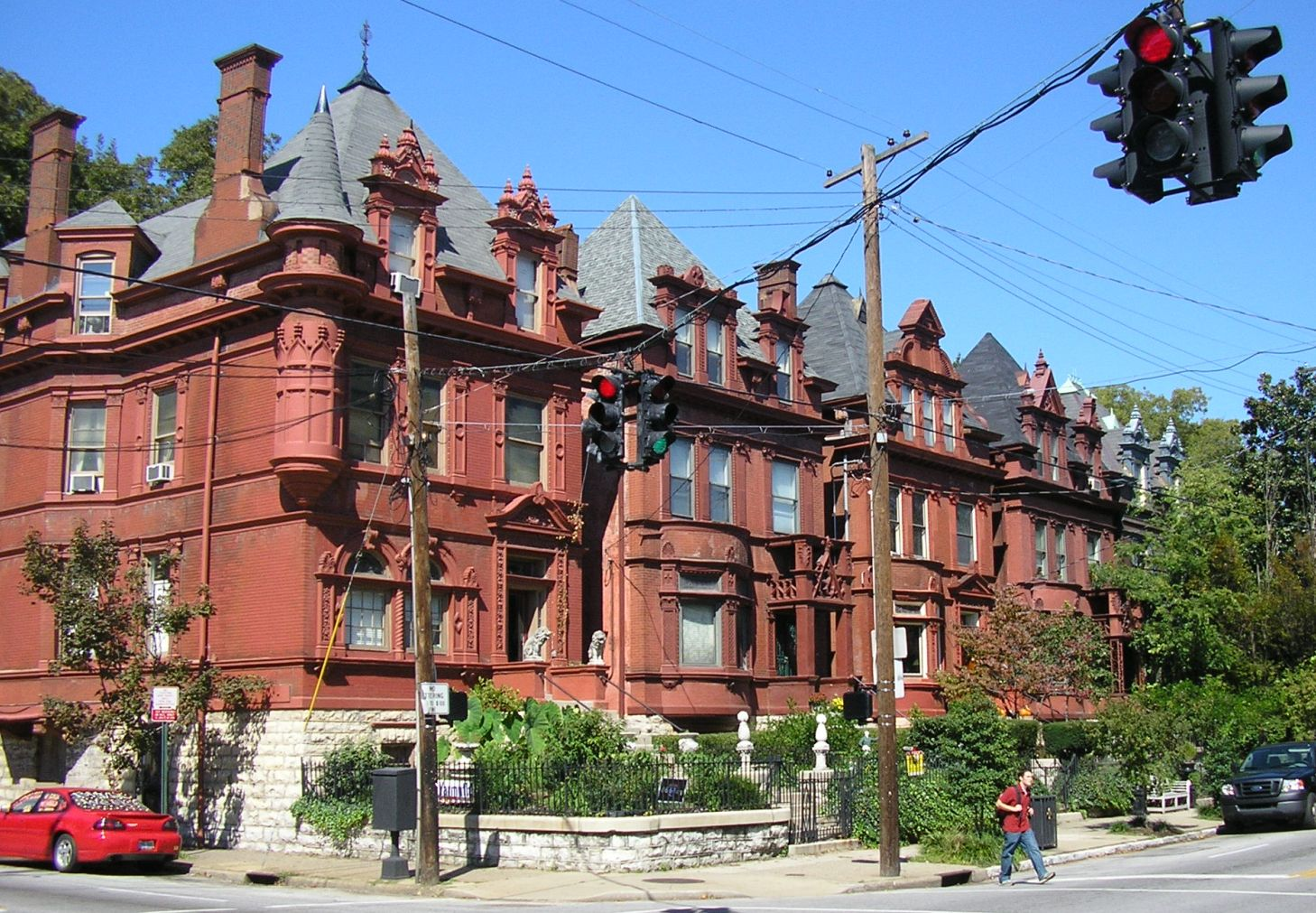
- Werne's Row at the corner of 4th and Hill

- Location within Kentucky Location within the United States
- Location: Louisville, Kentucky
- Built: 1850-1920s
- Architectural style: Late Victorian
- Website: oldlouisville.org
- NRHP reference No.: 84001583
- Added to NRHP: July 12, 1984

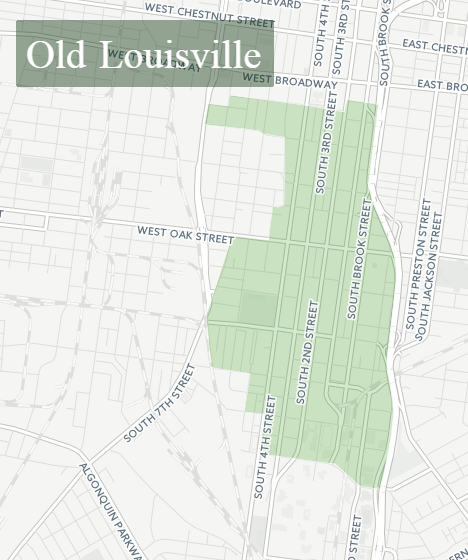
Old Louisville

Old Louisville is a historic district and neighborhood in central Louisville, Kentucky, United States. It is the third largest such district in the United States, and the largest preservation district featuring almost entirely Victorian architecture. It is also unique in that a majority of its structures are made of brick, and the neighborhood contains the highest concentration of residential homes with stained glass windows in the U.S. Many of the buildings are in the Victorian era styles of Romanesque Revival, Queen Anne, or Italianate, and many blocks have had few or no buildings razed. There are also several 20th-century buildings from 15 to 20 stories.

Old Louisville consists of about forty-eight city blocks and is located north of the University of Louisville's main campus and south of Broadway and Downtown Louisville, in the central portion of the modern city. The neighborhood hosts the annual St. James Court Art Show on the first weekend in October.

Old Louisville was built as a suburb of Louisville starting in the 1870s, nearly a century after the city was founded. It was initially called the Southern Extension, and the name "Old Louisville" did not come into use until the 1960s. Old Louisville was initially home to some of Louisville's wealthiest residents, but saw a decline in the early and mid-20th century. Following revitalization efforts and gentrification, Old Louisville is currently home to a diverse population with a high concentration of students and young professionals.

== History ==
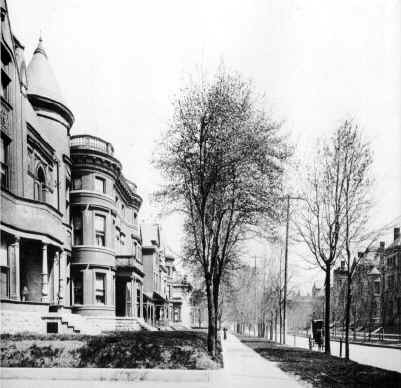
Third and Park Avenue intersection in 1897

Large-scale development in Louisville south of Broadway did not begin until the 1870s, nearly a century after what is now Downtown Louisville was first settled. The area was initially part of three different military land grants issued in 1773, and throughout the early and mid-19th century the land passed through the hands of several speculators while much of it was used as farmland. Some of the land south of Broadway was still in its natural state during this time, such as the 50-acre (200,000 m^{2}) tract between Broadway and Breckenridge, known as Jacob's Woods, a popular picnic ground as late as 1845. A major attraction was Oakland Race Track.

Country estates had been built in the area as early as the 1830s, and some of Louisville's great early mansions, predominantly in the Italianate style, were built along Broadway, very near Old Louisville, before the Civil War. Development from 1850 to 1870 occurred between Broadway and Kentucky Street, the northern extreme of what came to be called Old Louisville. North-south city streets were extended throughout the area in the 1850s, and a mulecar line was extended down Fourth to Oak in 1865.

The land south of Broadway that became Old Louisville was annexed by the city in 1868, as a part of larger expansion efforts. This annexation moved the southern boundary of the city as far south as the city's House of Refuge, an area which is now the University of Louisville campus and the southern border of Old Louisville. A year later, architect Gideon Shryock called the area "a growing and beautiful suburban locality". By 1876 about a quarter of the area was occupied.

Development continued as lots were sold southward to present day Oak Street, about a third of the way between Broadway and the House of Refuge. The principal road through the suburb at this time was Central Plank Road, which became Third Street. The emerging area was called the Southern Extension by this time. Growth south of Oak was very slow until the Southern Exposition was held annually in the area from 1883 to 1887.

At the urging of Courier Journal editor Henry Watterson, the city held the Southern Exposition, which in the words of Watterson, was meant to "advance the material welfare of the producing classes of the South and West." It was held on 45 acres (180,000 m^{2}) at the heart of Old Louisville, where St. James Court and Central Park (originally Dupont Square) would eventually be located, and included a 600 by 900-foot (270 m) enclosed exhibition building. The Exposition was opened by President Chester Arthur and attracted nearly one million visitors in its first year. The exhibition featured the first public display of Thomas Edison's light bulb, as well as what was billed as the largest artificial lighting display in history with 4,600 lamps, in a time when electric lighting was considered a novelty.

During the 1880s, after the exposition ended, the area between Oak and Hill Streets rapidly developed and became one of the city's most fashionable neighborhoods. According to historian Young E. Allison, 260 homes valued at a total of $1.6 million were constructed in Old Louisville from 1883 to 1886. The dominant styles by this time were Queen Anne and Richardsonian Romanesque. An example of the latter, which was known for its turrets, towers and bay windows, was the Conrad house at St. James Court.

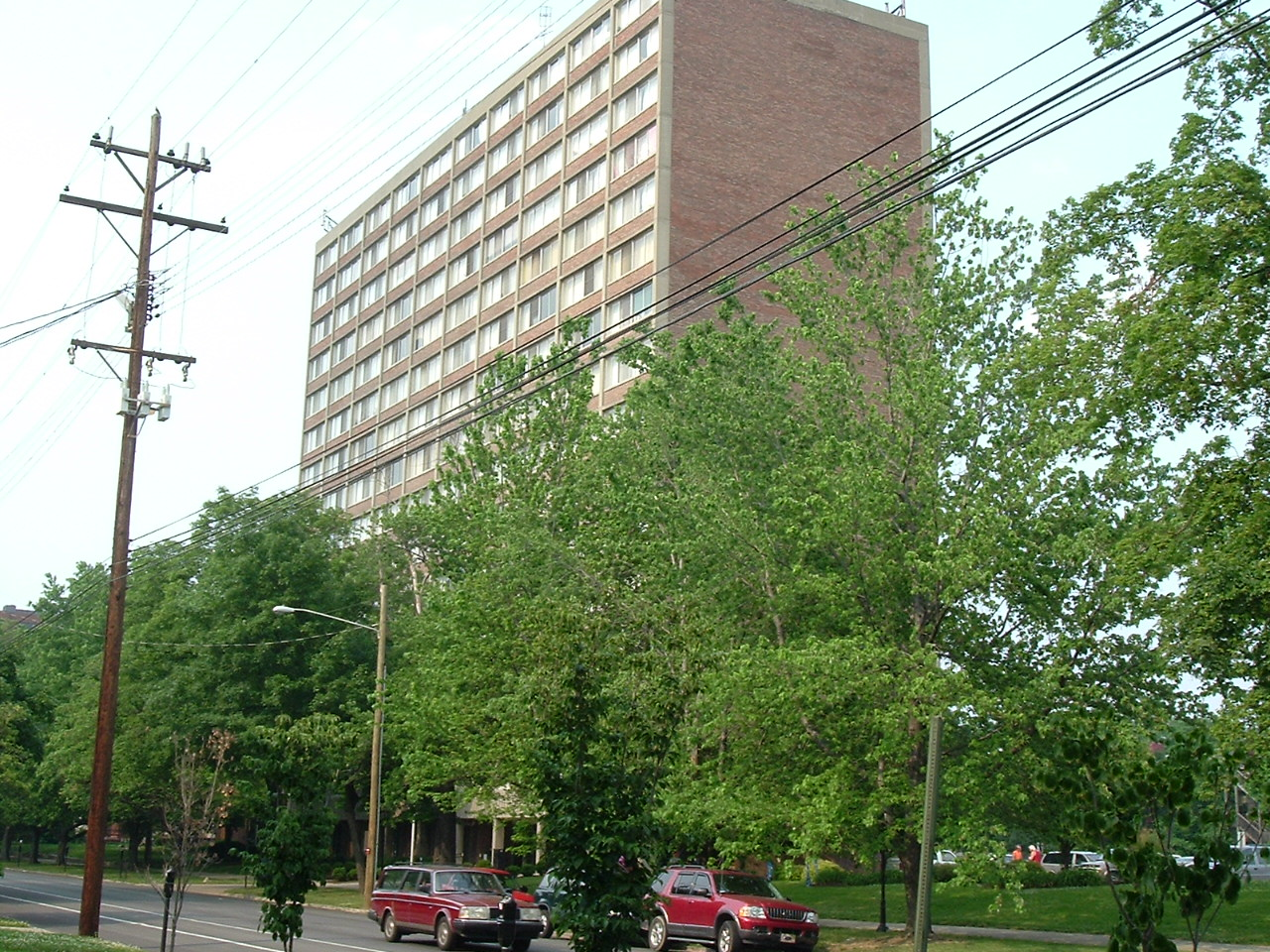
The Hillebrand house is one of several residential high rises in Old Louisville

These styles became less prevalent in the 1890s as the remaining southern portions of Old Louisville, between Ormsby and the House of refuge, were filled in, predominantly with buildings in the Chateauesque and Renaissance Revival styles. This included one of Old Louisville's most famous sections, St. James Court, developed starting in 1890 and envisioned as a haven for the upper class, and was completely occupied by 1905. Described as "the epitome of Victorian eclecticism", the area included houses in such styles as Venetian, Colonial, Gothic and others.

From 1890 to 1905 the area was home to the Amphitheatre Auditorium, which claimed the second-largest stage in the United States and showcased many of the day's best actors. The structure, located at the corner of 4th and Hill Streets, was razed after its owner William Norton Jr. died. Another form of entertainment in the area was baseball, with the game first being played by 1860 and an early ballpark at Fourth and Ormsby emerging after the Civil War. By 1875, a new park had been built near St. James Court.

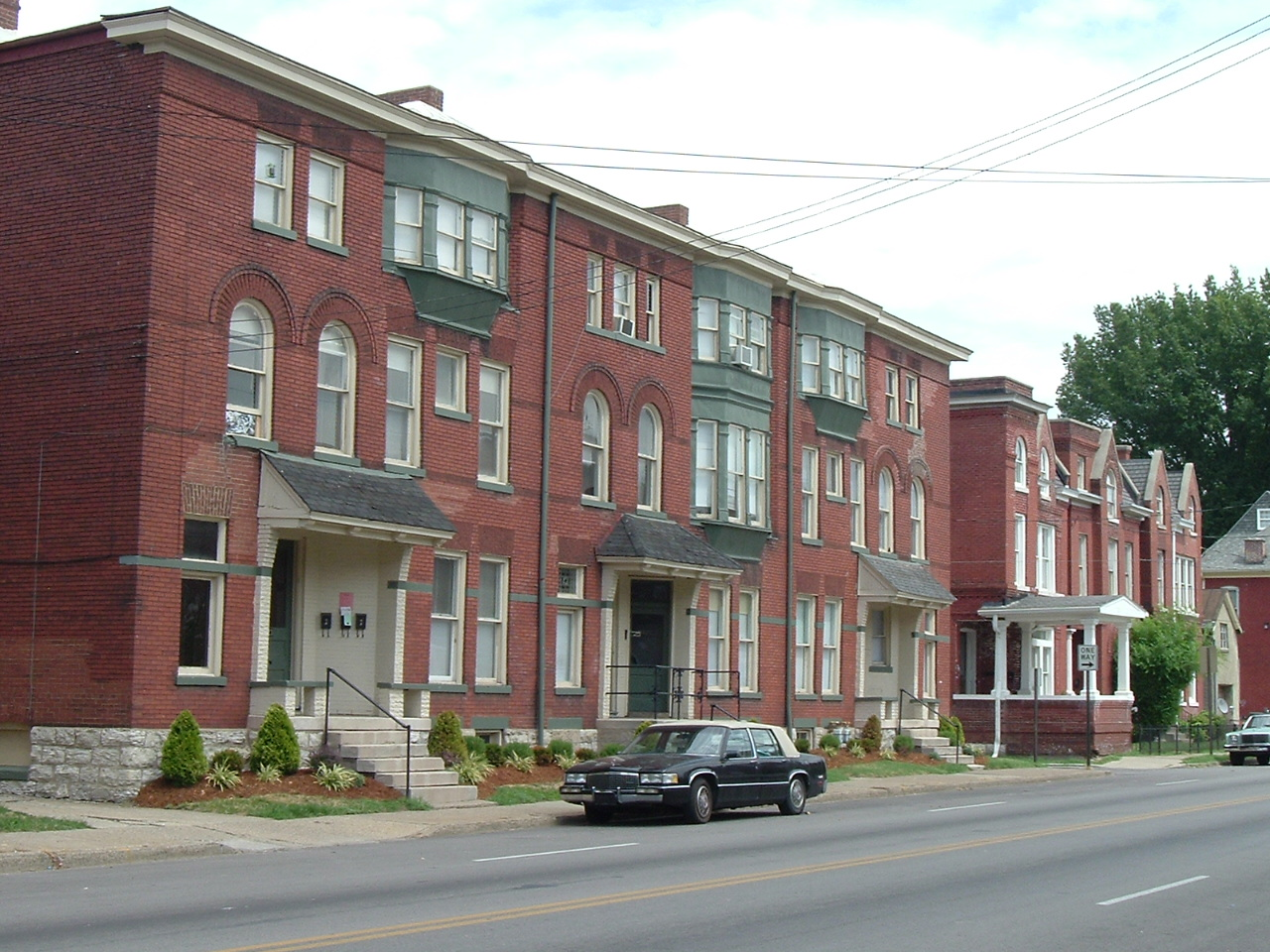
A Townhouse along Hill Street

Old Louisville is also home to the Ferguson Mansion, built by Edwin Hite Ferguson. Ferguson commissioned the Louisville architectural firm of Cobb and Dodd—the same firm responsible for designing the Seelbach Hotel and the new capitol building in Frankfort—to design his home in 1901. Construction of the mansion took four years (1901–1905) and cost $100,000, which was approximately ten times the cost of the neighboring Victorian homes. At the time, the mansion was the most expensive home in Louisville. In the 1920s, the Fergusons sold the home to the Pearson family, and it served as the Pearson Funeral Home until the mid-1970s. The house also provided the headquarters for John Y. Brown Jr.'s successful 1979 gubernatorial campaign. In 1986, the mansion became the headquarters of The Filson Historical Society.

At its peak in the late 19th century, Old Louisville was the center of Louisville's high society, with nearly all persons listed in the Society Directory of Louisville having Old Louisville addresses. The directory also listed the reception days and hours of Old Louisville's leading ladies, which varied by street (such as Tuesdays on Fourth Street or Thursdays on Second).

=== Decline ===
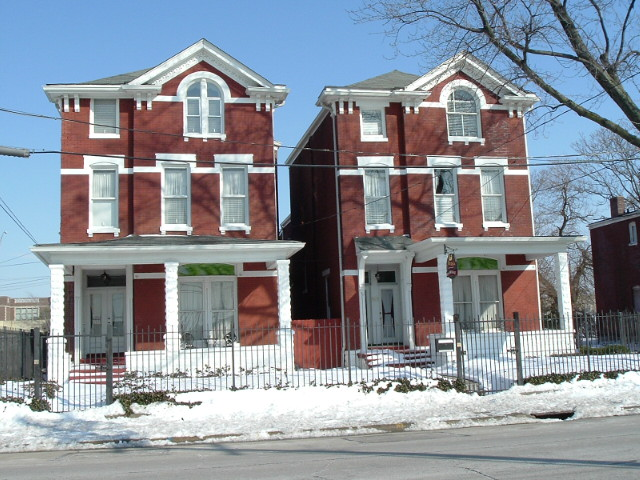
Two Victorian Homes just 3 blocks from Broadway. Old Louisville's residential section once extended all the way to Downtown prior to the 1960s

Old Louisville gradually declined as many of its wealthy inhabitants moved to newer streetcar suburbs such as Cherokee Triangle or built estates in areas east of Louisville recently connected by railroad such as Anchorage and Glenview. Many of the large homes in Old Louisville were converted to boarding houses during the Great Depression, and the Ohio River flood of 1937 caused many of the remaining wealthy households to move above the river's flood plain.

The gradual abandonment of Old Louisville by the wealthy was a reflection of changing lifestyles brought on by technology. Many homes of Old Louisville were originally built as mansions that would require several servants to maintain. Because of the relatively high wages offered by manufacturing jobs, servants were no longer affordable to all but the wealthiest families by the mid-20th century. Interurban rail lines, and increasingly automobiles, meant that the wealthy no longer had to live so close to their businesses, and many chose to live in what had previously been summer homes in the county's east end. The lifestyle that created Old Louisville was effectively obsolete.

In the interwar period, many of the neighborhood's old mansions were hastily converted into apartments to house the growing labor supply, a practice encouraged by the federal government at the time through low-interest loans. However, after World War II, with the housing shortage solved by large-scale suburban development affordable to the middle class, vacancy rates in Old Louisville surged. To attract renters, landlords in Old Louisville had to lower rents dramatically, attracting less affluent tenants.

A large section of the neighborhood, from around Kentucky Street to Broadway, was razed. Many buildings south of Lee Street, and nearly all south of Avery Street (renamed Cardinal Boulevard) were razed for the construction of Noe Middle School, expansions to DuPont Manual High School and the University of Louisville, and expansions to industry east of Floyd Street. From 1965 to 1971, 639 buildings were razed as a part of this effort. However, the plan did spur the restoration of over 100 buildings in other parts of Old Louisville.

During the 1960s many low income residents downtown who were displaced as a result of urban renewal moved into the newly converted apartments, especially on the north side of the neighborhood. The area was now considered drug ridden and undesirable by most Louisvillians. The very term Old Louisville, first becoming associated with the area in the 1940s, had mostly negative connotations initially, as historian Samuel W. Thomas put it, "In an Era where architectural styles were changing dramatically, old meant out of fashion".

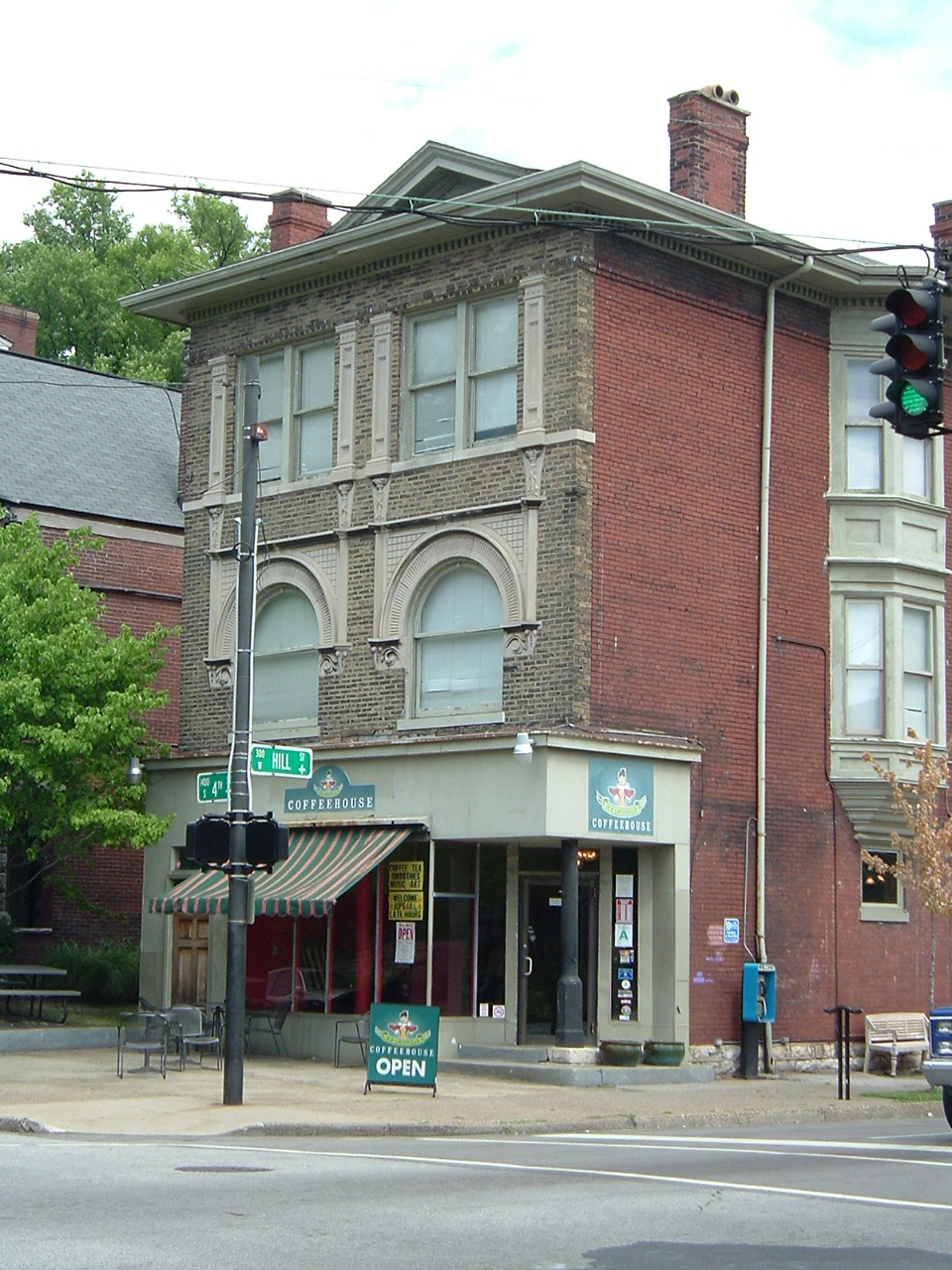
The Old Louisville Coffee House at 4th and Hill Streets

=== Revitalization ===
One of the first to take an active role in preserving and revitalizing Old Louisville was Louisville Courier Journal writer J. Douglas Nunn. In 1960, he began a vigorous public information campaign concerning the area. Nunn compared it to neighborhoods such as Georgetown in Washington, D.C. and Beacon Hill in Boston. In 1961 Nunn took a leave of absence from his job and started "Restoration, Inc.", a group that restored ten homes in Old Louisville's Belgravia Court in 1961. This spurred interest in preservation that led many local activists to move to the area, and led to the first use of the name "Old Louisville" in print in that year. With the activists' efforts, the area was made a historic preservation district in 1975. The area has continued to improve, with new restaurants and shops opening and many students, and young professionals moving into the area. Property owners, who once cheaply converted the old houses to apartments, have invested more in improvements since the 1980s, and several properties have been converted into luxury condominiums. The median home value more than doubled between 1990 and 2000, increasing at a faster rate than Louisville as a whole. This process has been described as gentrification.

The area is now one of the most ethnically and economically diverse in Louisville. Crime is becoming less of a problem. While in 2003 there were 11.5 crimes per 1,000 residents, over twice the average for the city of Louisville as a whole, which was 5.0 crimes per 1,000 residents Old Louisville now has a similar number of calls for police assistance as other parts of Louisville. The Louisville Metro Police 4th Division is responsible for a large portion of Louisville beyond Old Louisville, but is conveniently located in Central Park in Old Louisville. It had 134 officers assigned to it in 2006. Most calls are related to car break-ins and non-violent crimes. Murders are still rare, with one or two per year. Overall crime rates for both Old Louisville and the city as a whole increased sharply in 2005 over the 2004 rate, although there was a decline again the first half of 2006.

== Features and attractions ==
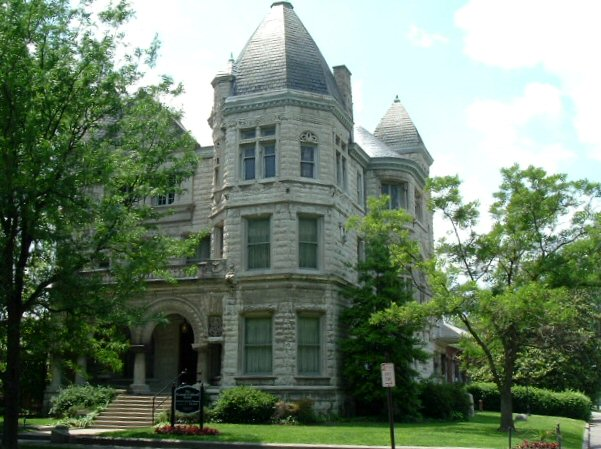
The Conrad-Caldwell House at St James Court and Magnolia Avenue

Old Louisville features the largest collection of pedestrian-only streets of any U.S. neighborhood. Eleven such "courts", where houses face each other across a grass median with sidewalks, were built in the neighborhood from 1891 to the 1920s. Most of the courts are centered off of 4th Street. Belgravia Court and Fountain Court were the first ones to be built in 1891 and are the most well known. Later ones included Reeser and Kensington (1910), which were built with large Victorian styled apartments instead of single family homes; and Eutropia and Rose Courts, which were the last ones built in the 1920s and featured small, single story houses. Belgravia and St. James Court were partially rehabilitated as a part of the urban renewal that began in the 1960s. These developments are apparently unique to Louisville.

Two of the three major four-year universities in Louisville are located adjacent to Old Louisville, with Spalding University to the north and the University of Louisville to the south. DuPont Manual High School, a public magnet school, and Presentation Academy, a Catholic girls' high school, are also located in Old Louisville.

The neighborhood contains The Filson Historical Society, Louisville's Central Park, which features the Kentucky Shakespeare Festival every summer, the Actors Theatre of Louisville Production Studio, and the Conrad-Caldwell House. The area of 6th and Hill Streets in the neighborhood was the setting of the best selling novel Mrs. Wiggs of the Cabbage Patch by Louisvillian Alice Hegan Rice. Today there is a non-profit counseling and services center, named Cabbage Patch Settlement House for the novel, on 6th Street at Magnolia Avenue, which serves children of low-income families. During the Christmas holiday season a number of private homes are toured in the Old Louisville Holiday Home Tour.

West End Baptist Church, originally St. Paul's Episcopal, designed by Louisville architects Mason Maury and William J. Dodd

Old Louisville's boundaries are Kentucky Street to the north, Avery Street (Cardinal Boulevard) to the south, I-65 to the east, the CSX railroad tracks to the west. Originally, the neighborhood extended all the way to Broadway on the north, Attwood Street on the south, and Floyd Street on the East; but the northern part was mostly razed for parking lots and light industry, the southern area between Attwood and Avery Streets (now Cardinal Blvd) was razed when the University of Louisville doubled the size of its main campus, and I-65 was built through the area in the 1960s, which created a physical barrier between it and Shelby Park neighborhood.

=== Architecture ===
Old Louisville is well known for its architecture, with styles ranging from Federal to Queen Anne. Very few antebellum buildings remain, and the most impressive buildings were built in the late 19th century. There are a few Italianate, Beaux-Arts and Second Empire-style houses, but Victorian styles dominate. Victorian Gothic styles are commonly seen. Many styles in Old Louisville are united by their use of red sandstone trim, which became popular by the 1880s to the point that the Courier-Journal said that "few new residences are going up in Louisville in which it is not being used". Another common Victorian style in the area is Richardsonian Romanesque.

Aside from the best represented styles of architecture listed above, Old Louisville also has several great examples of the Chateauesque style of architecture in select buildings throughout the area. For example, one of these examples is a residential building, a mansion, at 400 Belgravia Court, which is a "walking court" where the mansions face a park like walk rather than a street. This specific building was completed in 1897 and one of its first residents was William H. Wathen, M.D., an eminent medical educator in Louisville from a family of successful distillers.

Although some portions have been razed, many entire blocks remain almost untouched, and historian Theodore M. Brown said "it remains the only nineteenth-century segment of the city that is mostly intact". Some American Craftsman style houses can be found in Old Louisville, which were built as infills.

=== Tallest buildings ===
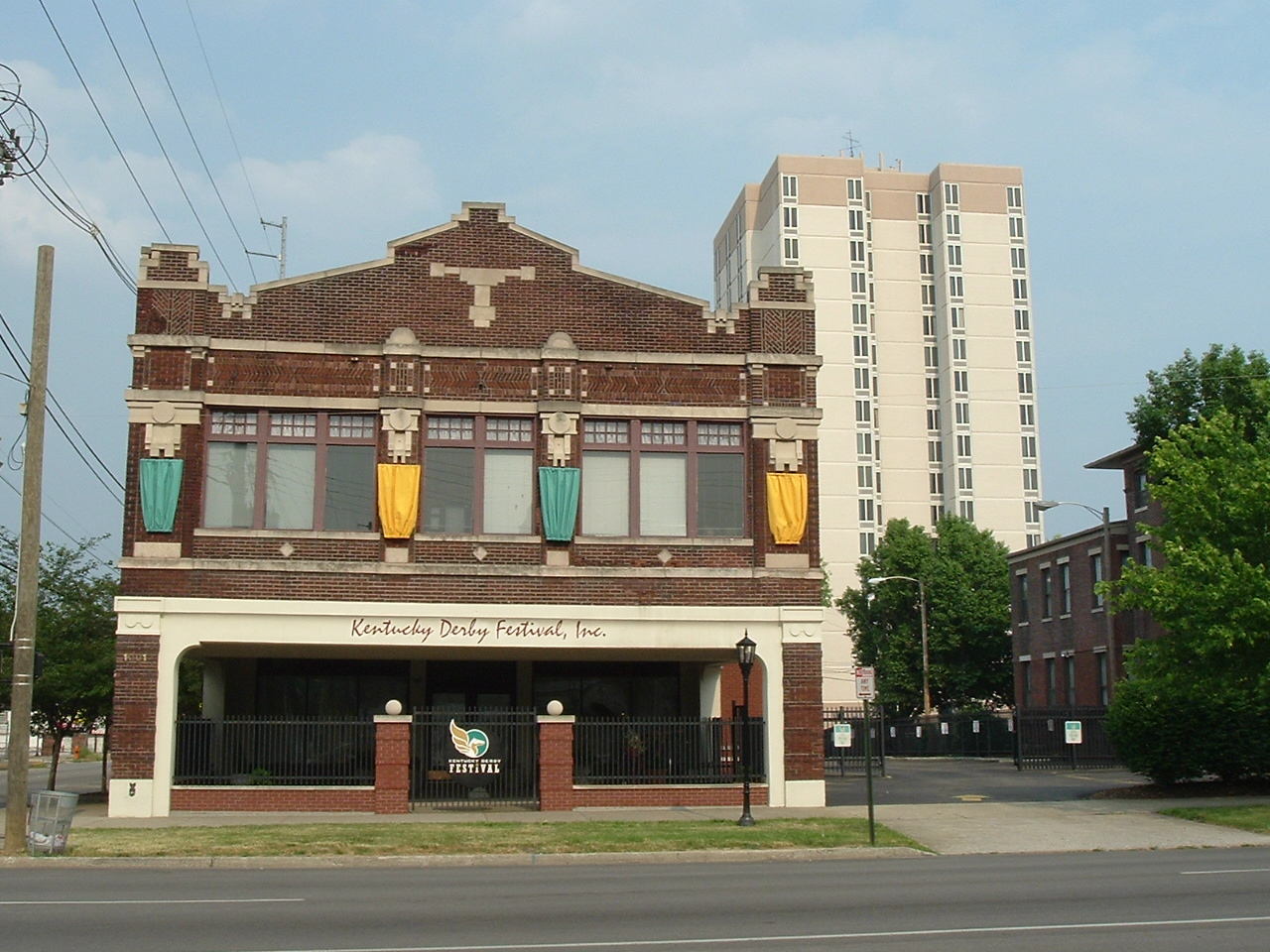
Baptist Towers is pictured in the background.

Building	Stories	Location
Baptist Towers	17	1014 South 2nd Street at Kentucky Street
Hillebrand House	16	1235 South 3rd Street at Ormsby Ave
St Catherine Court	15	114 South 4th Street at St Catherine Street
Treyton Oak Towers	12	211 West Oak Street at 2nd Street

=== St. James Court Art Show ===
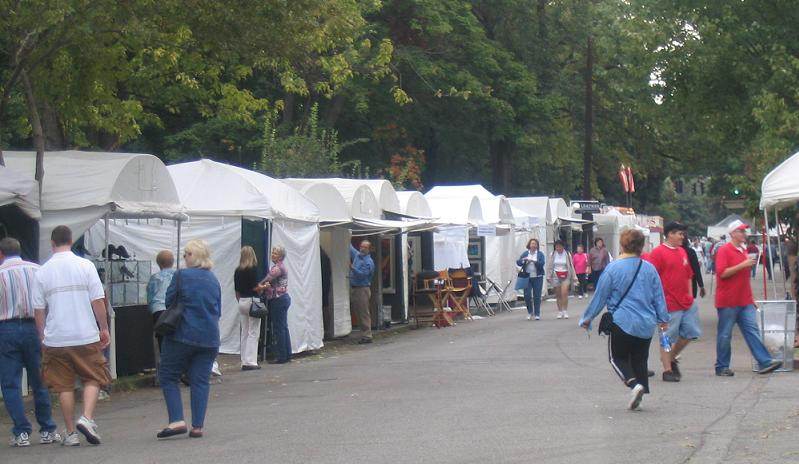
St. James Court Art Show in 2004

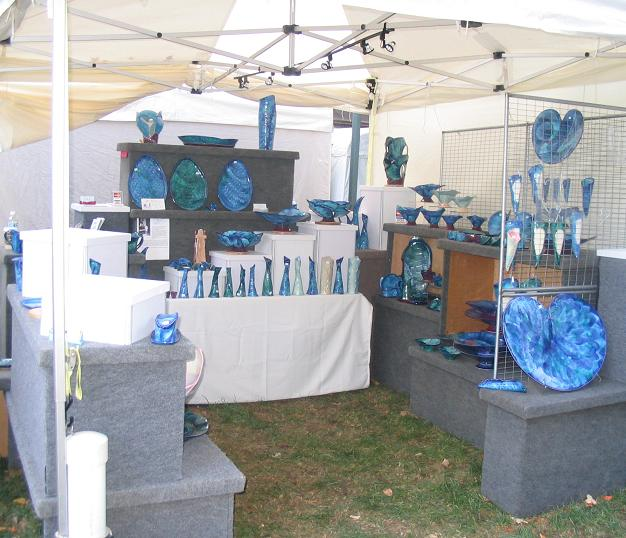
Each booth showcases a unique set of artistic works

The St. James Court Art Show, colloquially called the St. James Art Fair, or just St. James, is a popular free public outdoor annual arts and crafts show held since 1957 in Old Louisville. Mostly situated to the south of Central Park, the show is normally held on the first weekend in October, and includes more than 700 artisans from various locations throughout the Americas. The show draws nearly 300,000 people, one-third from out of state, each year. The show is put together by a group of various neighborhood associations in Old Louisville. In addition to the various items for sale, the show attracts various state and local politicians, charities, churches, radio stations and publishers who take the opportunity to promote themselves to the public. The event is sponsored by various corporate donors. There are various awards given out for "Best of Show," "People's Choice," the poster contest and several scholarships. The show has been ranked #1 in the nation by Sunshine Artist Magazine.

Being held in the neighborhood Old Louisville has a particular significance because the St James Art show was founded in order to produce revenue and sustain the surrounding area. Old Louisville at the time the St James Art Show was created was in a financial decline; however, today it is known as one of the most popular areas of Louisville. Old Louisville became a historic district in 1975, and also has the United States largest collection of Victorian style homes. The art show is almost exclusively outdoors. The 2020 show went virtual due to the COVID-19 pandemic, but the 2021 show resumed in person.

== Demographics ==
Year	Population
1970	16,338
1980	12,678
1990	13,349
2000	13,317

As of 2000, the population of Old Louisville was 11,043, of which 55.9% are white, 35.0% are black, 6.3% are listed as other, and 2.3% are Hispanic. College graduates are 24.5%, people without a high school degree are 22.6%, and people with college experience without a bachelor's degree are 28.4%. Females are 52.3% of the population, males are 47.7%. Households making less than $15,000 a year are 40.8%; although that is largely a function of the 27% of residents who are full-time college students. Ironically, Old Louisville has the youngest median age of any Louisville neighborhood and the highest percent of people between the ages of 20–29 (25%).

Old Louisville's is about 1.7 square miles (4.4 km^{2}) in area, and its population density is 7,800 persons per square mile. The best preserved portions, between Kentucky and Hill streets, have a density of over 10,000 persons per square mile.

== Regions ==
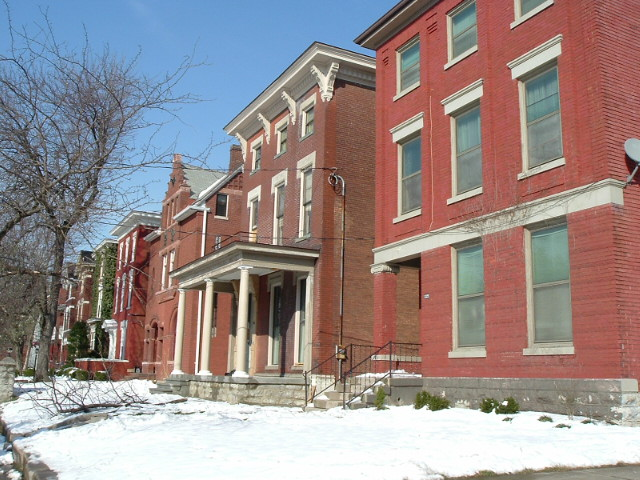
Brook Street in eastern Old Louisville

Old Louisville is broken up into five different census tracts by the US Census Bureau. There are stark differences revealed by the different tracts from north to south.

Census Tract	Location	Percent Bachelor's Degree or Higher	Percent w/o HS degree	Percent White	Percent Black
53	Generally South of Hill Street	53.9%	4.3%	58.4%	29.1%
52	btw Hill Street and Ormsby Ave	38.6%	13.3%	61.4%	32.3%
66	btw Hill and Kentucky Streets, East of 1st Street	24.9%	24.6%	56.1%	38.5%
51	btw Ormsby Ave and Kentucky Street	15.2%	24.9%	53.3%	42.9%
50	btw Kentucky and York Streets	9.7%	31.7%	49.3%	47.3%

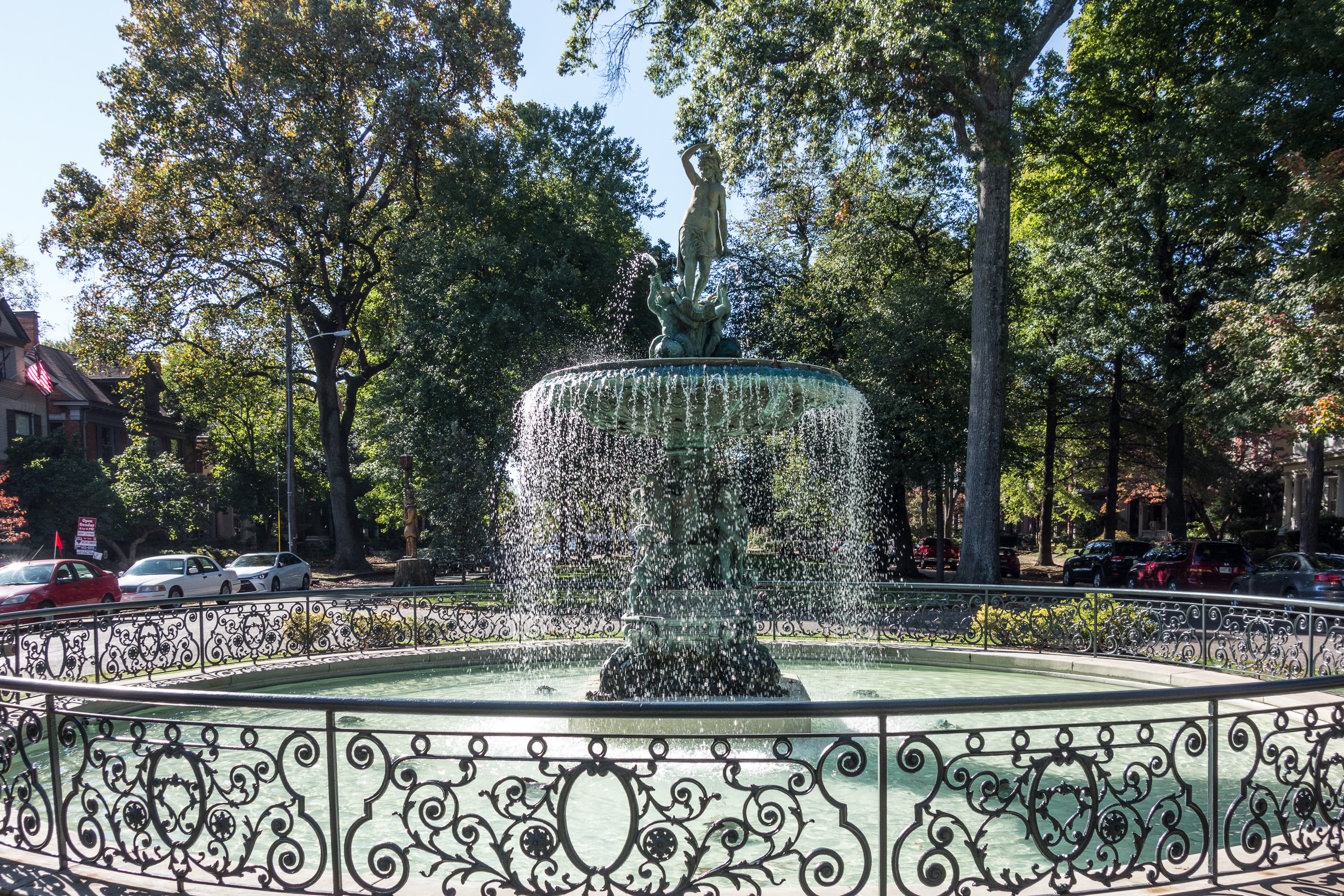
St. James Court Fountain was installed 1892.

Old Louisville has eight different neighborhood associations, each of which provides different infrastructure. For example, on 4th Street the street lights are designed as old lamp posts and trash cans are ornamented with fleurs-de-lis, while on St. James Court there are gas lamp posts, 3rd and 2nd Streets have small light posts on the sidewalks, and Ouerbacker Court has cast iron decorative gates.

== Culture ==
After years of decline with abandoned buildings and high elderly populations, the demographics of Old Louisville began to change noticeably in the 1990s. New residents were not just college students using the area as housing, but also young professionals who wanted to live in Old Louisville. The Courier-Journal's Velocity weekly has reported the area as a hip, emerging center of culture in Louisville. This change is reflected in numerous coffeehouses, restaurants and bars opening in Old Louisville in the 1990s and early 2000s targeting at the younger crowd.

Old Louisville is one of the most liberal neighborhoods in Louisville and the state of Kentucky. In 2004, it voted for Democratic presidential nominee John Kerry by a 60% margin and against a successful proposal to amend the state constitution to define marriage as "between one man and one woman" by a 66% margin.

== Images ==
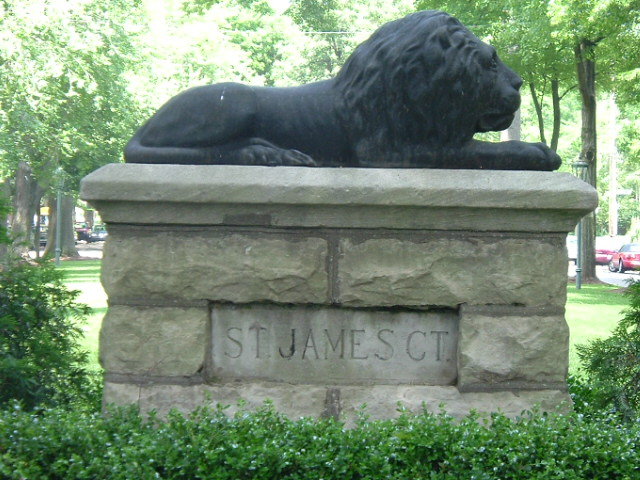
A stone lion at the entrance to St James Court

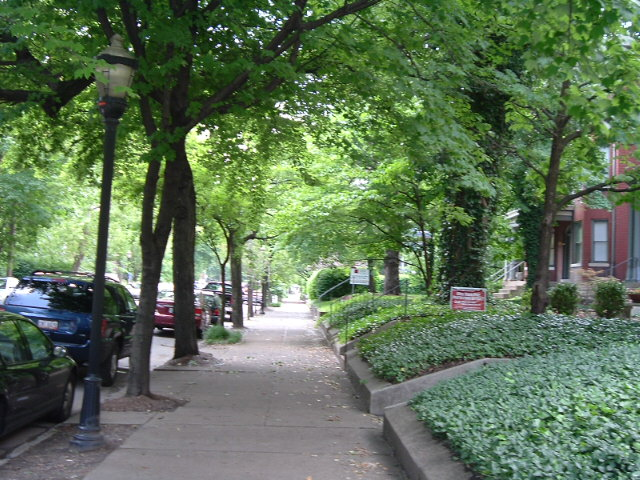
Tree-lined 4th Street

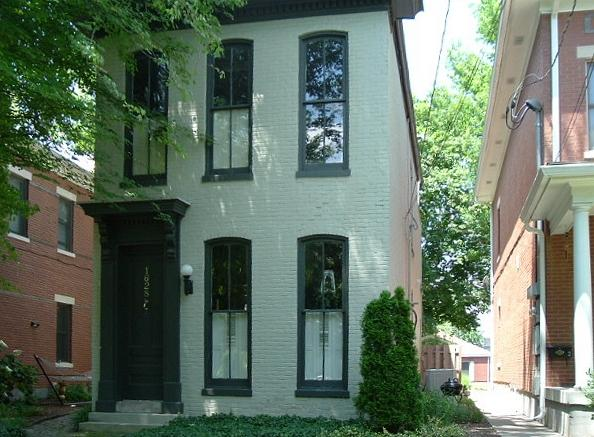
A two-story house on 4th Street

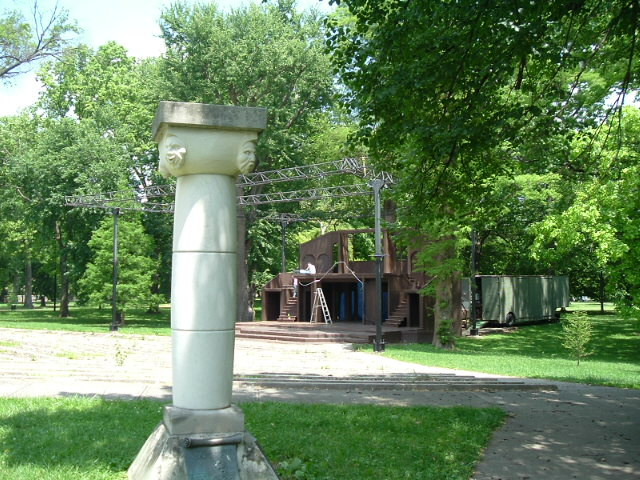
The Shakespeare monument in Central Park

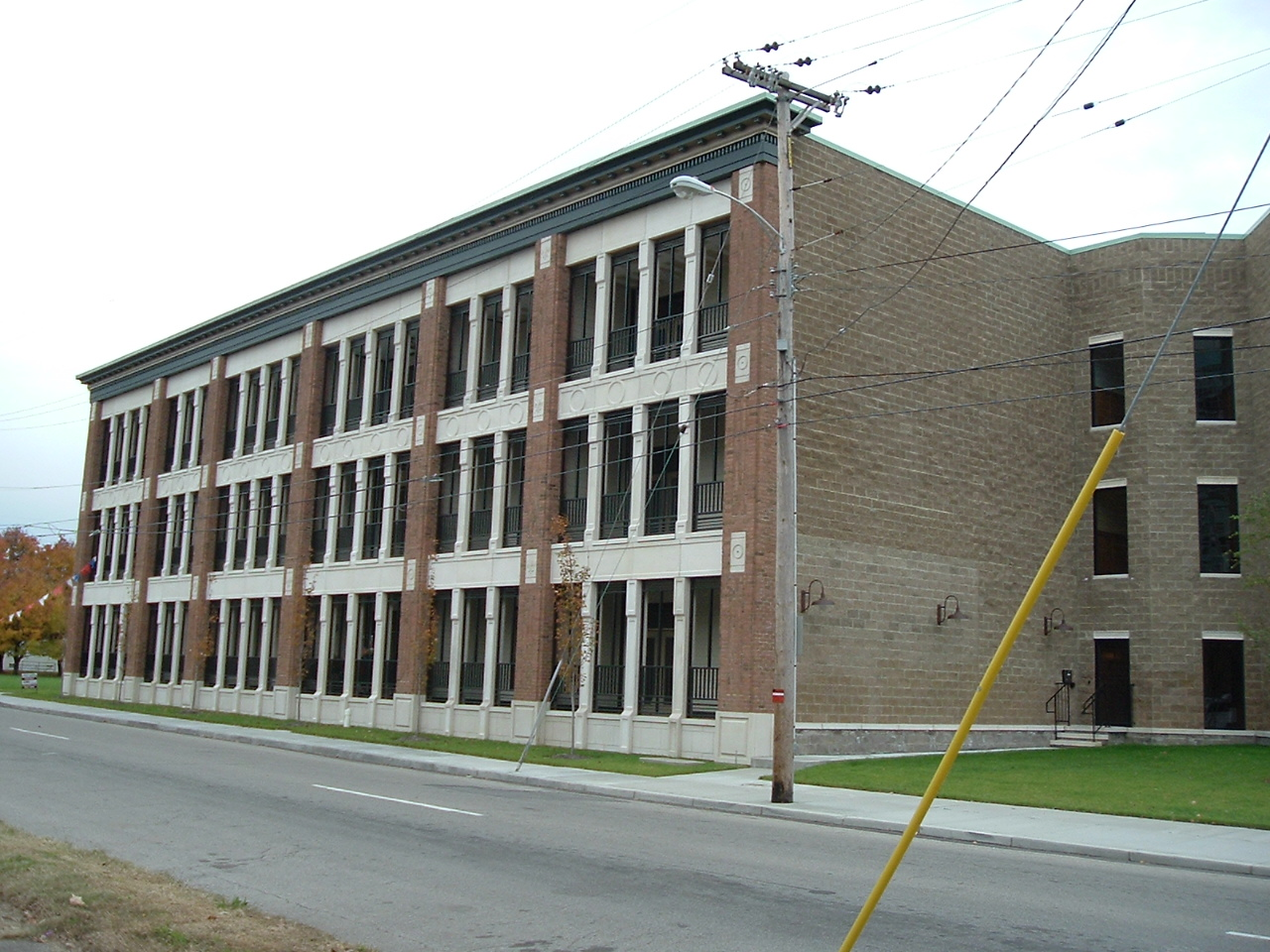
SoHo Condominiums at 6th and Breckinridge Streets

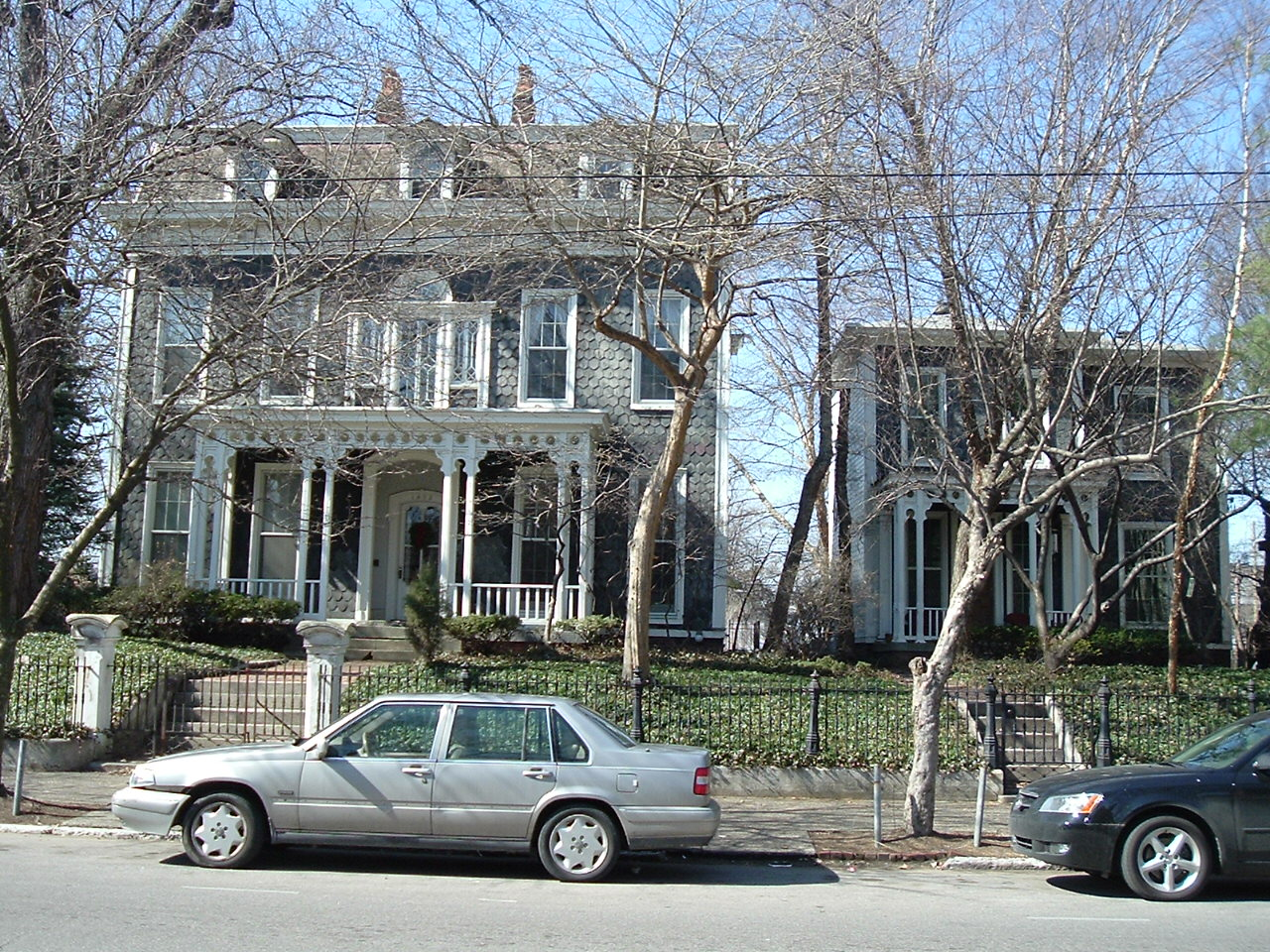
Locally dubbed the "Hansel and Gretel House", this home on 6th Street is believed to be sided with the original roofing from the Southern Exposition Building. It was opened as a center for disadvantaged women and children

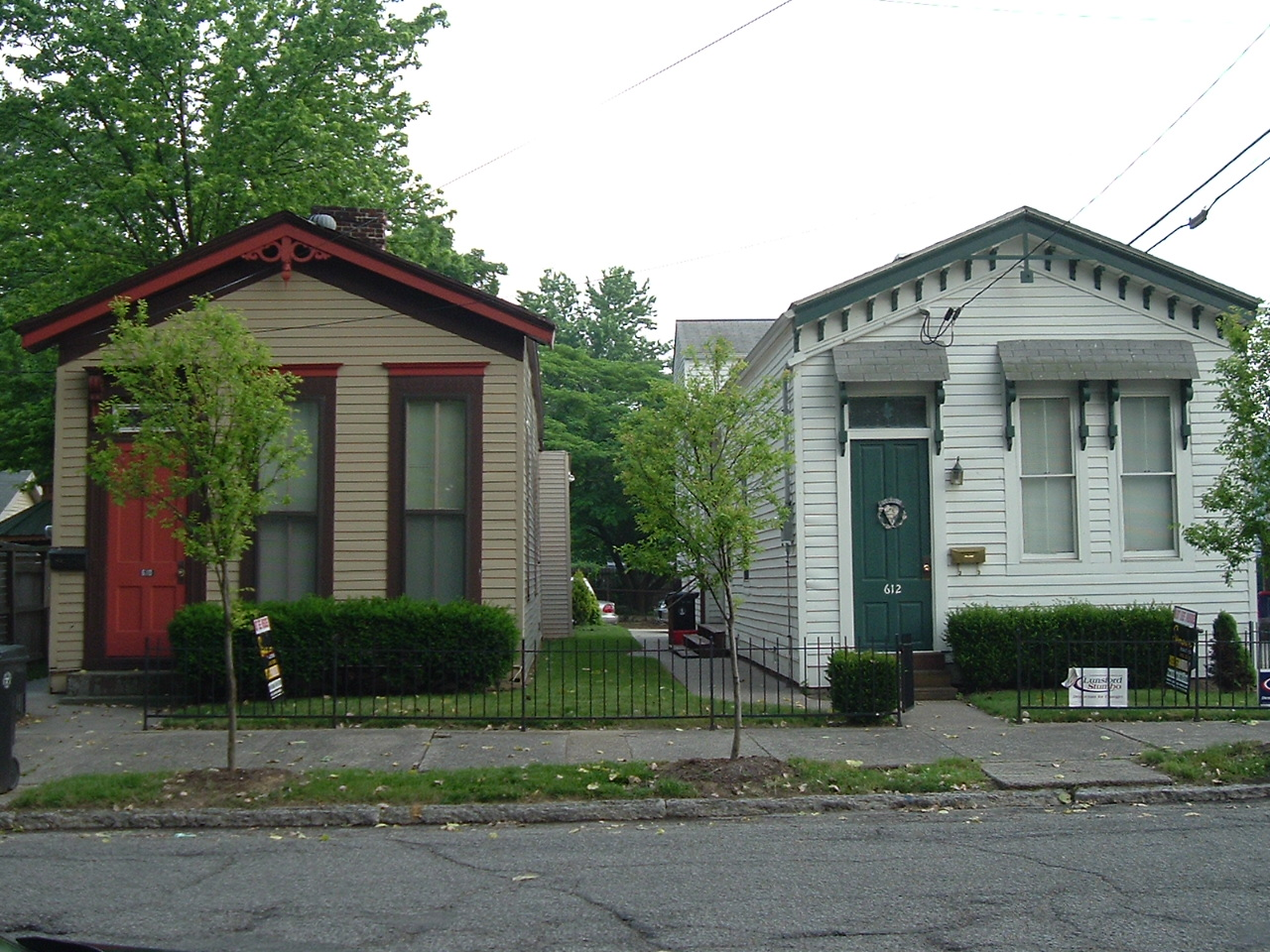
Shotgun houses on Myrtle Street

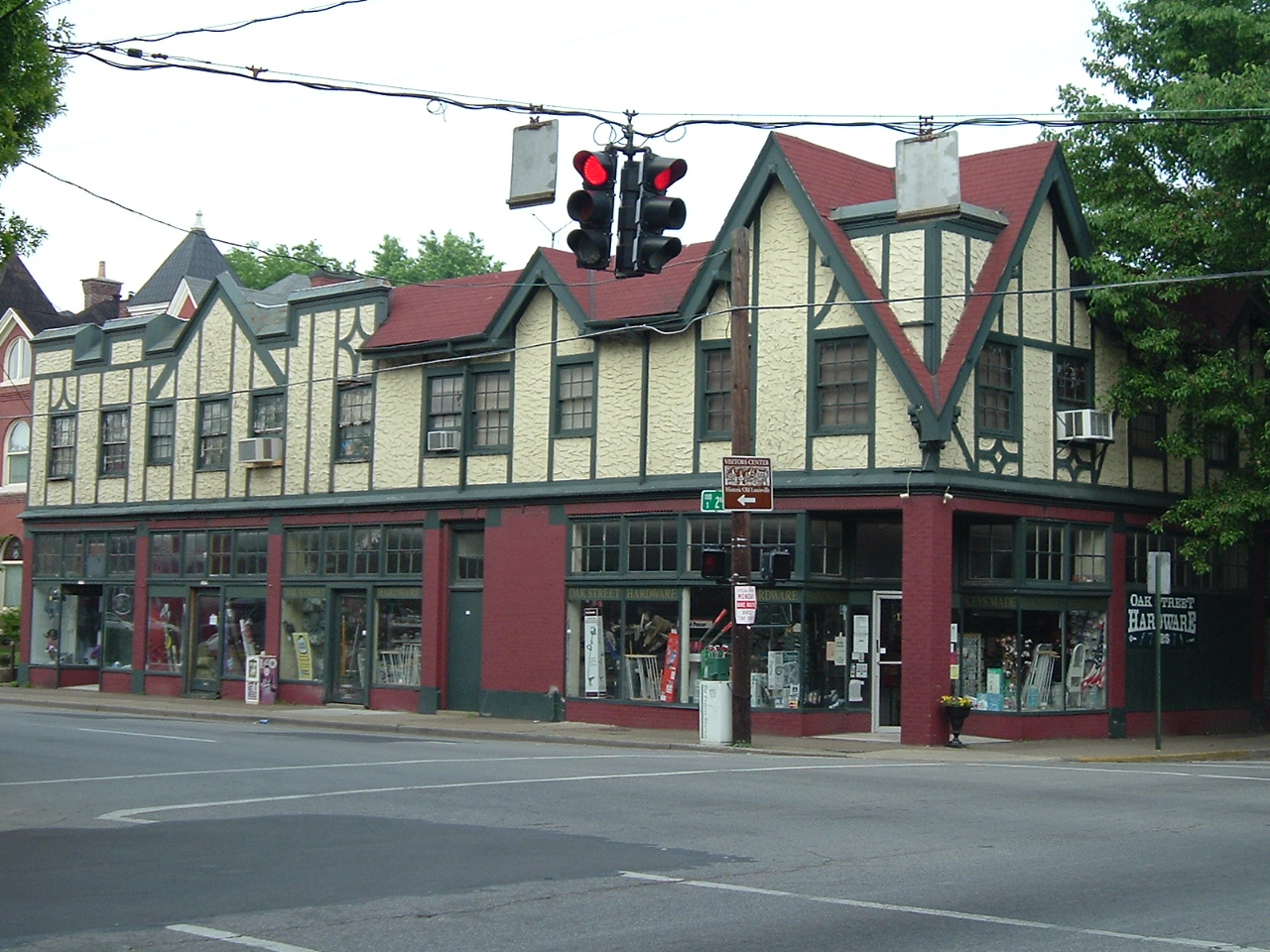
Northeast corner of 2nd and Oak Streets

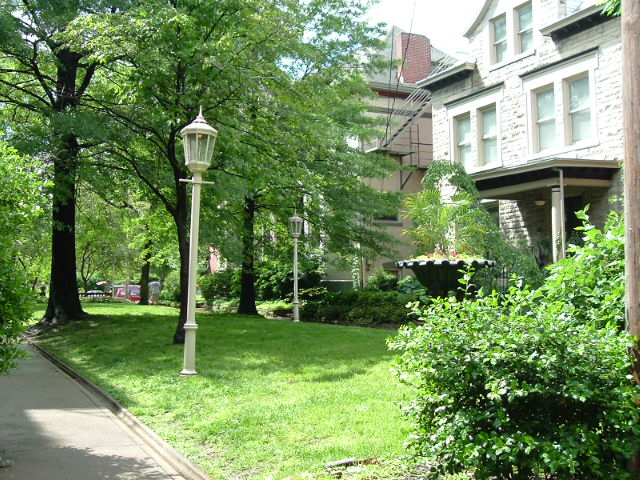
St James Court

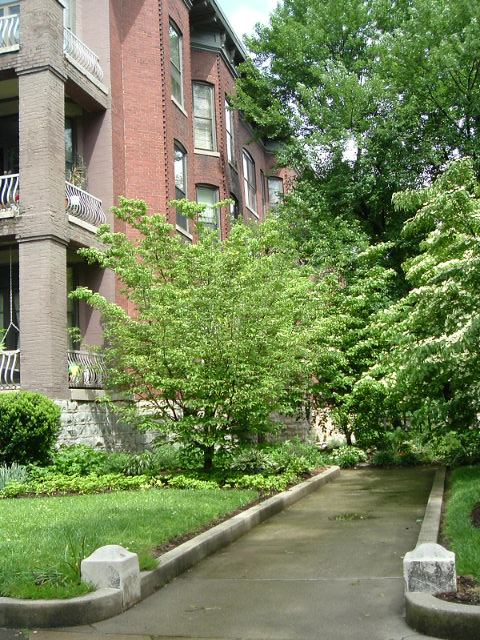
Fountain Court

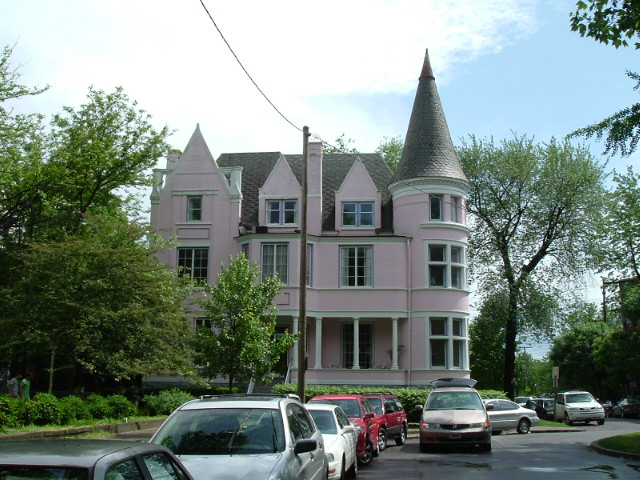
St. James Court's "Pink Palace"

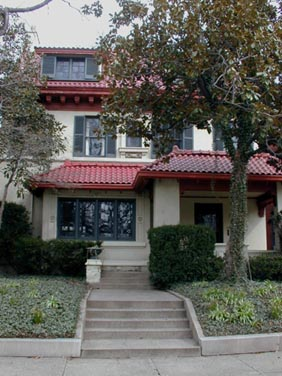
T. Hoyt Gamble House in the 100 West block of Ormsby Ave. Built in late 1912.

== See also ==
- Cherokee Triangle, Louisville
- West Main District, Louisville
- List of attractions and events in the Louisville metropolitan area
- National Register of Historic Places listings in Old Louisville, Kentucky
