= Episcopal Church of the Advent (Louisville, Kentucky) =

Church in Kentucky, United States

Coordinates: 38°14′34.8″N 85°43′33.7″W

The Episcopal Church of the Advent is located in Louisville, Kentucky. The congregation began as a Sunday school of Louisville's Christ Church Cathedral in 1870 which met in a store at Broadway and Baxter Avenue and was called "Sunday School of the Advent". In 1872 it moved to Rubel Avenue near Broadway, and was formally organized as a congregation in 1874.

As the Cherokee Triangle neighborhood of Louisville was being subdivided, the creation of East Broadway (soon renamed Cherokee Parkway) cut off a triangle of land that belong to Cave Hill Cemetery, which rendered it useless for burials in the carefully planned facility, so the cemetery company sold the land to the Church of the Advent.

The congregation hired Frederick C. Withers of New York to construct the church building, and the cornerstone was laid in 1887. The church was built in a late Victorian style, with limestone walls, a slate roof, a series of gables and a tower. The first service was held on April 15, 1888, two Sundays after Easter that year.

When Cherokee Triangle was added to the National Register of Historic Places as a district, the Church of the Advent was described in the listing document as "the architectural and historical keystone of the district".

The Rev. Dr. Timothy Mitchell, a Louisville native, was installed as Rector in May 2008.

== See also ==
- List of Registered Historic Places in Jefferson County, Kentucky
