= Werne's Row =

Coordinates: 38°13′34.8″N 85°45′43.7″W

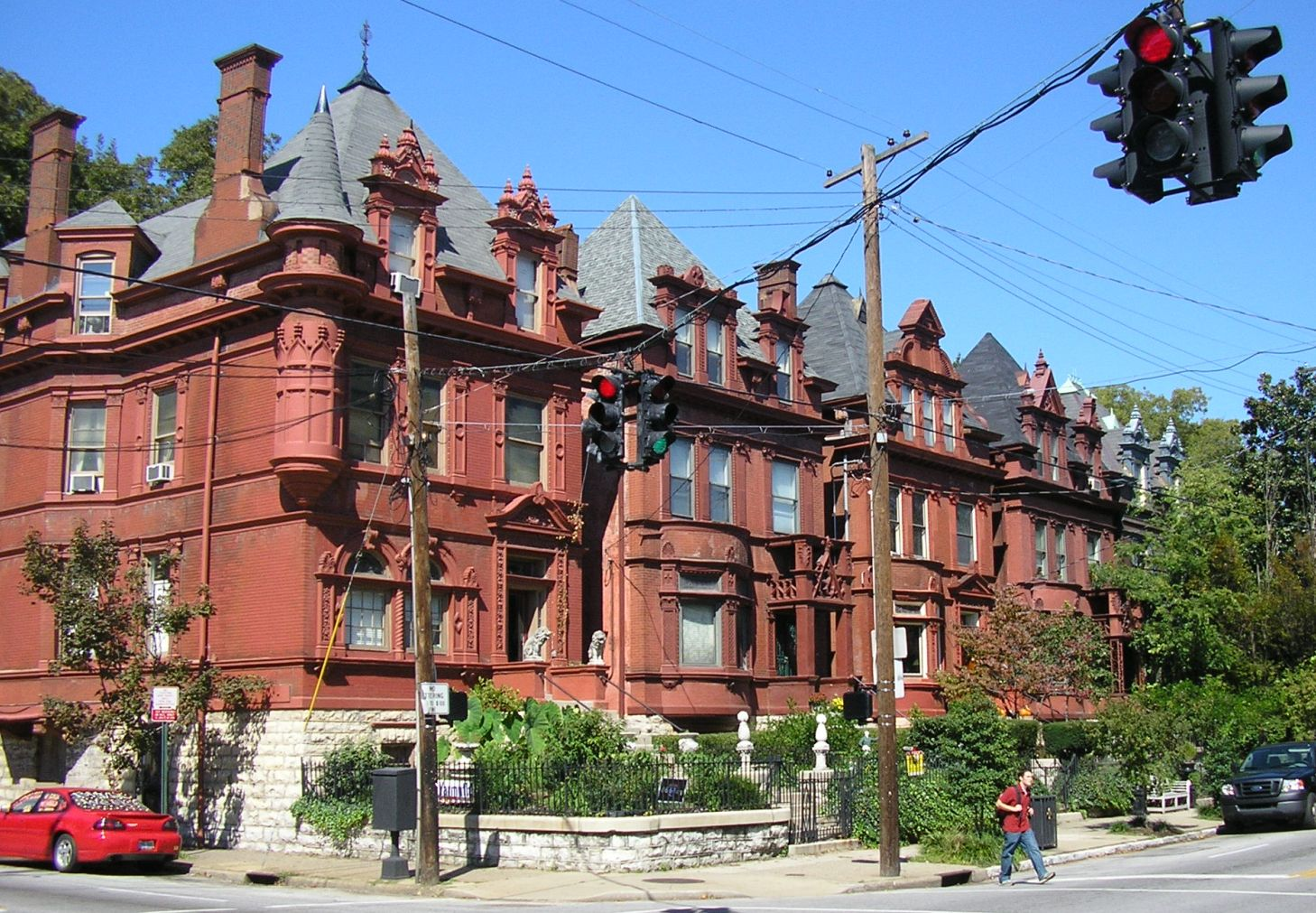
Werne's Row

Werne's Row-- located at 1476-1468 South 4th Street and 102 Belgravia Ct—is a row of five nearly identical Châteauesque mansions in the Old Louisville neighborhood of Louisville, Kentucky, United States. Built in 1897 for prominent jeweler and antiques dealer Joseph Werne, the residences were designed by local architect F.W. Mowbray, who also designed Louisville's Union Station. Interior designer Claude Balfour handled the home's interiors.

Werne and his wife lived in the house overlooking the southwest corner of 4th & Hill, while surgeon Dr. William Wathen resided in the house bordering Belgravia Court to the north.

All five homes are very similar in style, except for small ornamental features. Although only one foot apart, none of the houses touch. A private park for the Wernes existed behind the five houses; it has since become a parking lot for the Belgravia Court Association.

Three of the homes are subdivided into apartments, while the other two remain single-family dwellings.

== Images ==
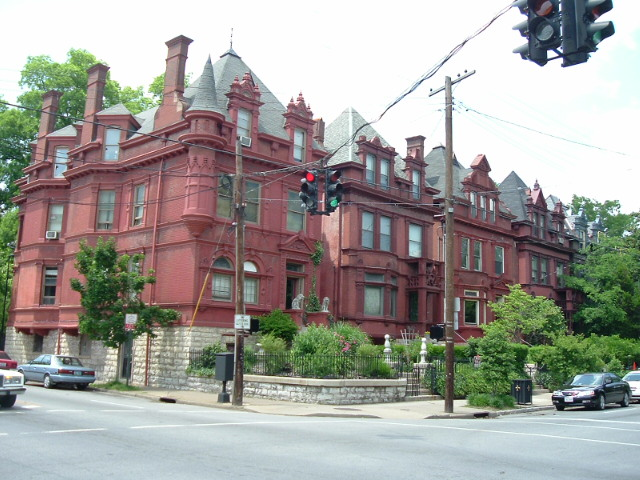

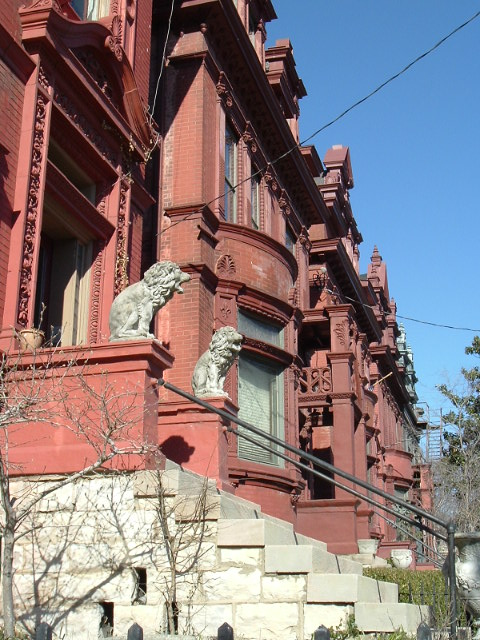

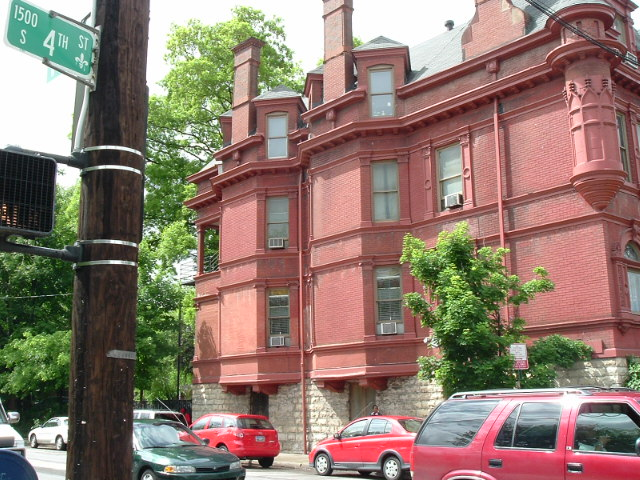

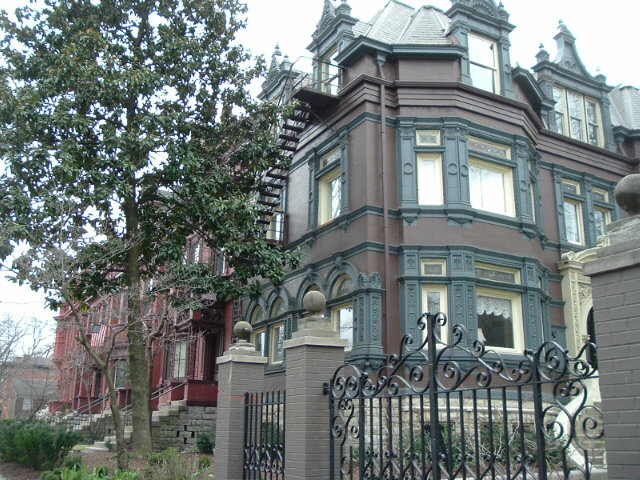

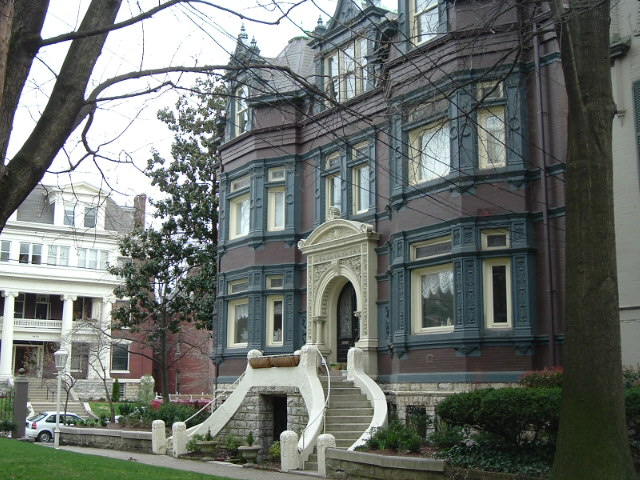

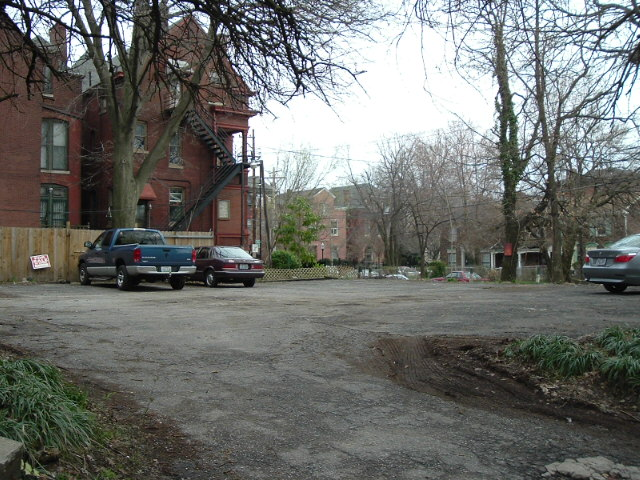
The Werne's former private park is now a parking lot
