= Highland Presbyterian Church (Kentucky) =

Coordinates: 38°14′27.7″N 85°43′20.5″W

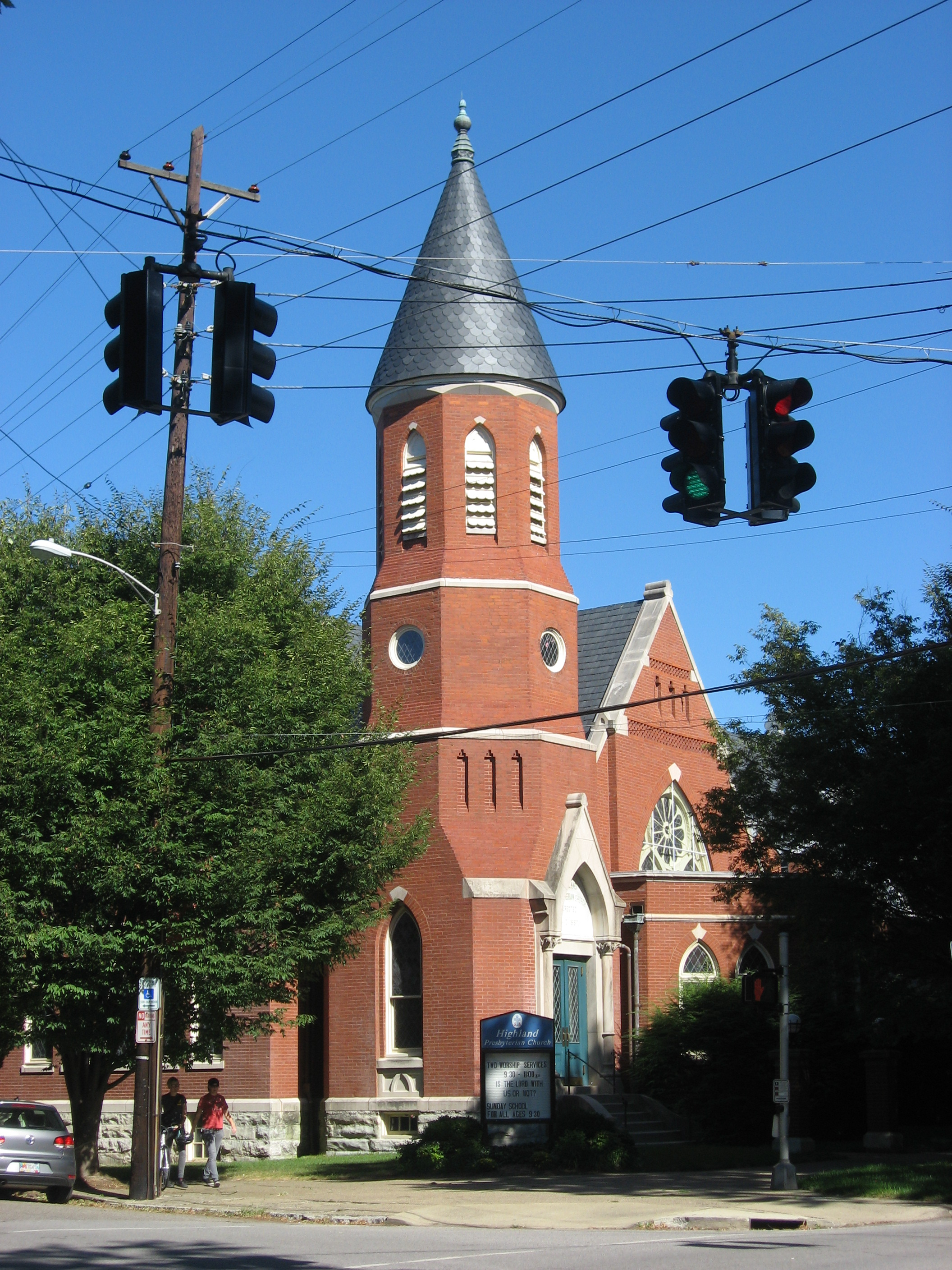
- "sharing hope from the heart of the Highlands" (motto)
- Highland Presbyterian Church
- Location: Cherokee Triangle, Louisville, Kentucky
- Country: United States
- Denomination: Presbyterian Church (USA)
- Website: www.hpclouisville.org

History
- Founded: 1873

Clergy
- Pastor(s): Rev. Megan McCarty and Rev. Adrian White

Highland Presbyterian Church is a Presbyterian Church (USA) church located in Louisville, Kentucky, US. The church was founded in 1873 with a meeting in a local physician's home; the current sanctuary was built in 1888. Former Pastor Cynthia Campbell was an outspoken advocate for social justice issues in the city and has contributed her thoughts on the topic in The Courier-Journal.
