= St. James–Belgravia Historic District =

Historic district in Kentucky, United States

Coordinates: 38°13′49.2″N 85°45′45.5″W

- U.S. National Register of Historic Places
- U.S. Historic district
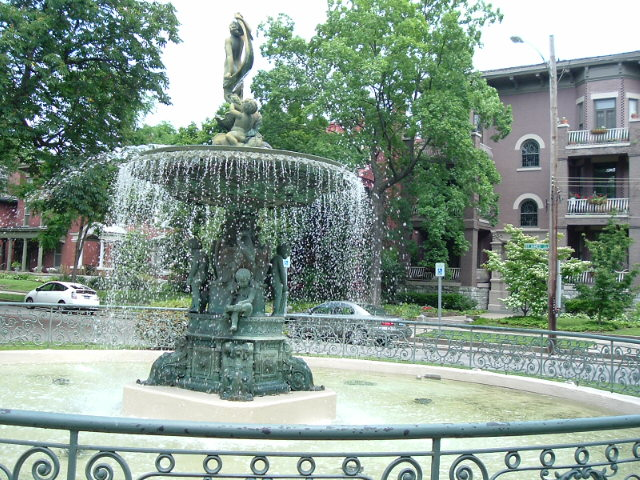
- St. James Court fountain

- Location within Kentucky Location within the United States
- Location: Louisville, Kentucky
- Area: Old Louisville
- Architect: Arthur Loomis
- Architectural style: Richardsonian Romanesque
- NRHP reference No.: 72000538 and 75000772
- Added to NRHP: December 5, 1972

The St. James–Belgravia Historic District, within Old Louisville, was placed on the National Register of Historic Places in 1972. It comprises St. James Court (north) and Belgravia Court (south). It is bordered to the north by Louisville's Central Park. The area was the site of the Southern Exposition and hosts the St. James Court Art Show which takes place annually the first weekend of October. Belgravia Court takes its name from Belgravia, an affluent district in London, England. Belgravia Court has no immediate street access for vehicles and is a "walking court" with a common green area and parallel sidewalks. St. James Court features two important houses: the Conrad–Caldwell House, and the Pink Palace.

== History ==
The history of St. James and Belgravia Courts is part of the broader story of what is now known as Old Louisville. As the city continued to develop south of the Ohio River, areas like this were used for various purposes over time. The land that is today St. James and Belgravia was at one time used for truck-farming and by 1875 became the site of the Louisville Baseball Park. The land was later cleared, buildings were erected, and it hosted the Southern Exposition from 1883 to 1887. The exhibition was held on 23 acres of open land south of Central Park.

After the close of the Exposition, the buildings were razed, and William H. Slaughter began acquiring the land in 1889. By June 1890, The Courier-Journal reported that William H. Slaughter purchased 52 lots of land between S. Fourth and S. Sixth Streets. The report also detailed his plan to develop a new area of homes that would “result in the establishment of one of the most beautiful residence sites in this city of beautiful residences.” The announcement noted without explanation that this new area would be named St. James Court. Although not stated, the selection of the names St. James and Belgravia, with their connections to London, England, were meant to enhance the exclusiveness of this new area and these new homes.

=== St. James Court ===
The plan announced in The Courier-Journal in June 1890 described the layout of the homes, sidewalks, streets, trees, and common green space. What would have been S. Fifth Street became an open green space that was 800 feet long by 125 feet wide and flanked by single lane streets flanking the green space. Homes were set back from the streets paralleling the central green space. The planned homes were fronted by sidewalks and rows of shade trees. In this original design, the landscape plan also called for three fountains, although only one was eventually installed.

The orientation of the long, wide central green space and the tall shade trees lining the perimeter echo the pattern of the central nave of a cathedral with trees forming columns and a canopied vault overhead. Walking the length of the central green space delivers a sense of progression and expansiveness given the overall proportions. The cathedral pattern continues with the dual streets forming aisles, a second row of trees providing additional columns, and the homes themselves forming proportional chapels along the perimeters. None of the surviving reports note a designer nor a specific precedent. The overall design, symmetry, and proportions of all the elements harmonize well together.

Slaughter's plan in 1890 included later developments of a stable for homeowners to house their horses and carriages, and a club or restaurant for residential entertainment.

In July 1890, Slaughter began working with a development group known as the Victoria Land Company to develop the court. The Victoria Land Company, composed of Messrs. John D. Taggard, John Stites, George H. Moore, and George Birob, acquired the entire tract of land from Slaughter for the price of $300,000. Leading residents of the city acquired lots from the Victoria Land Company and built homes over the next decade. Each home is unique and represents a distinctive expression of Victorian architecture and of Louisville's prosperity and growth. Nearly all the lots were sold and developed into single family homes.

One lot directly across from the central fountain was sold by the Victoria Land Company to Oscar Turner Jr. The Phillips Investment Company began developing this lot in 1895 into a five-story apartment building. Dr. L.S. McMurtry filed suit against Turner and Phillips Investment Company to prevent the development of the apartment building on the grounds that it violated the terms of the deed transfers for St James. The case alleged that when the property was subdivided the terms stipulated that the lots should be “used exclusively for the erection of private residences, according to a plan of uniformity and symmetry”. Neighbors objected not only to the height of the structure, but also to the nature of rental units and a proposed restaurant in the basement of the building. The apartment building was ultimately built with all five stories and stood eighty-two feet high. The upper floors of the building were damaged by fire in February 1912, and the building was refurbished and redesigned with only the current three stories.

Most homes on St. James (and Belgravia Court) were built between 1892 and 1905. Unfortunately, it was not long after the area was developed that the seeds of its decline took root and grew. A longer summary of the decline of Old Louisville provides more detail, but those same factors quickly affected St. James and Belgravia Courts. Changes in transportation (autos, street cars, and rail) and increased costs for domestic help made these homes less desirable within a couple decades of being built. The Great Depression in 1929, the Ohio River Flood of 1937, and two World Wars accelerated the decline. By 1952 the deterioration in Old Louisville was obvious, but St. James and Belgravia retained much of their charm and distinctiveness. To reverse this decline and to market the value of the architecture, neighbors came together to start a fundraiser for St. James, and in 1957 they held the first St. James Court Art Show.

=== Belgravia Court ===
Belgravia Court was also developed by the Victoria Land Company simultaneously with St. James Court. St. James runs north and south between Fourth and Sixth Streets, while Belgravia runs perpendicular to St. James and crosses it near the south end Hill Street intersection. There is little documentation for the design and planning of Belgravia, and it appears that it was simply part of the larger plan for the St. James area. The Courier-Journal reports deed transfers contemporaneous with those of St. James from the Victoria Land Company to individuals who purchased lots and built homes. The first three houses built on the court were originally numbered 3, 7 and 9 but are now numbered 504, 510 and 512. Mr. Southern K. Davie, a dealer in leaf tobacco, built the home at 504. The first residents of number 510 were newly weds Mr. and Mrs. Benjamin H. Ridgely. (Mr. Ridgely was an author and political appointee under President Grover Cleveland.) From those first houses in 1891 through 1901/1902, buyers purchased lots and built homes in a variety of late Victorian styles.

Belgravia's design copies that of St. James with a central common green space that is flanked by parallel sidewalks and two rows of tall shade trees. It also resembles the cathedral pattern of nave, aisles, columns, and side chapels. Belgravia is distinctly different in two important ways, however. First, Belgravia is on a significantly smaller scale. Whereas homes on St. James may average around 7,000 sq. ft. per house, homes on Belgravia average around 3,000-3,500 sq. ft. The common spaces are also reduced in size. Those size reductions lead to the second distinction from St. James, and that is that Belgravia is strictly a pedestrian court. There are two parallel sidewalks running the length of the court that mirror the one-way streets on St. James, but no access for carriages in the 1890s or later for automobiles. The architect Philip Johnson, who toured Belgravia in 1952, said that Belgravia was “a wonderful place”. He appreciated Belgravia because “of the sense of enclosed space you get in there. And no cars honking, tearing the spaces apart.”

== Significant structures ==
=== The Conrad–Caldwell House Museum ===
Conrad–Caldwell House Museum

The Conrad–Caldwell House, once nicknamed "Conrad's Castle", was built in 1893 by Arthur Loomis for Theophilus Conrad and his wife, Mary. Mr. Conrad found his fortune in the tanning business. After Conrad died on February 13, 1905, William E. Caldwell bought it for his family's residence and called it their home for 35 years. In 1947 the local Presbyterian church acquired it, and for the next forty years it was the Rose Anna Hughes Presbyterian Retirement Home.

This building's style is Richardsonian-Romanesque. Made of Bedford (Indiana) limestone, it cost "at least $35,000" to build. Its vertical framework comes from its heavy corner towers features and turrets that are one of three shapes: coned, hexagonal, and pyramid shaped. Randomly placed on the building are carving of animals, gargoyles, and other objects, fenestration, and intricate foliation. As fitting for a house to receive members of society in the Victorian Era, the interior features elaborately carved fireplaces, stained-glass windows, high ceilings in parlors and dining rooms, with carved arched fretwork leading the way into these rooms from the reception hall with its large staircase. The interior woodwork is cherry, bird's eye maple, and golden oak. Known for its parquet flooring, the designs mimic quilt patterns and feature the woodwork in the room.

The St. James Court Historic Foundation, Inc, a 501(c)3 non-profit organization, has owned the building since 1987, and uses it for a museum. The building complex also offers rental spaces for a variety of uses.

=== The Pink Palace ===
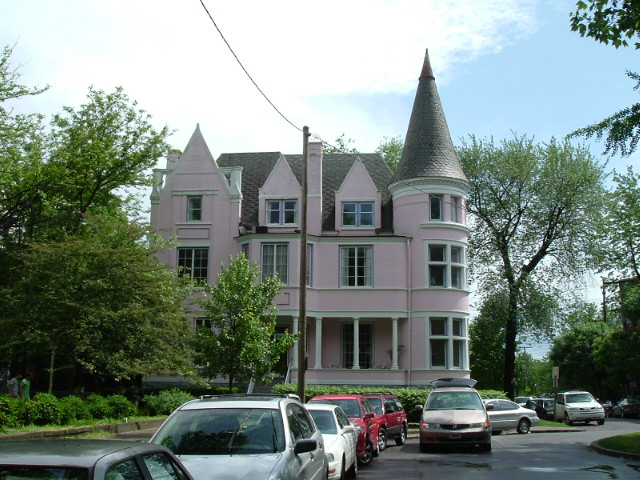
The Pink Palace

Located at the corner of St. James and Belgravia Courts, the Pink Palace, built in 1891, was not originally a home, but an exclusive Gentleman's Club and Casino for the residents of the Court.

The Jefferson County Women's Christian Temperance Union purchased the property on May 28, 1948, and held the property until September 1972.
