= Porter–Todd House =

Historic house in Kentucky, United States

- U.S. National Register of Historic Places
- Location within Kentucky Location within the United States
- Location: 929 S. 4th St., Louisville, Kentucky
- Coordinates: 38°14′29″N 85°45′33″W
- Area: 0.1 acres (0.040 ha)
- Built: 1869
- Architectural style: Italianate
- NRHP reference No.: 79001013
- Added to NRHP: April 30, 1979

The Porter–Todd House, an Italianate house at 929 S. 4th St. in Louisville, Kentucky, was built in 1869. It was listed on the National Register of Historic Places in 1979.

It is a white-painted brick building with two front porches that are "among a very few fine examples of decorative Victorian cast iron work remaining in Louisville."

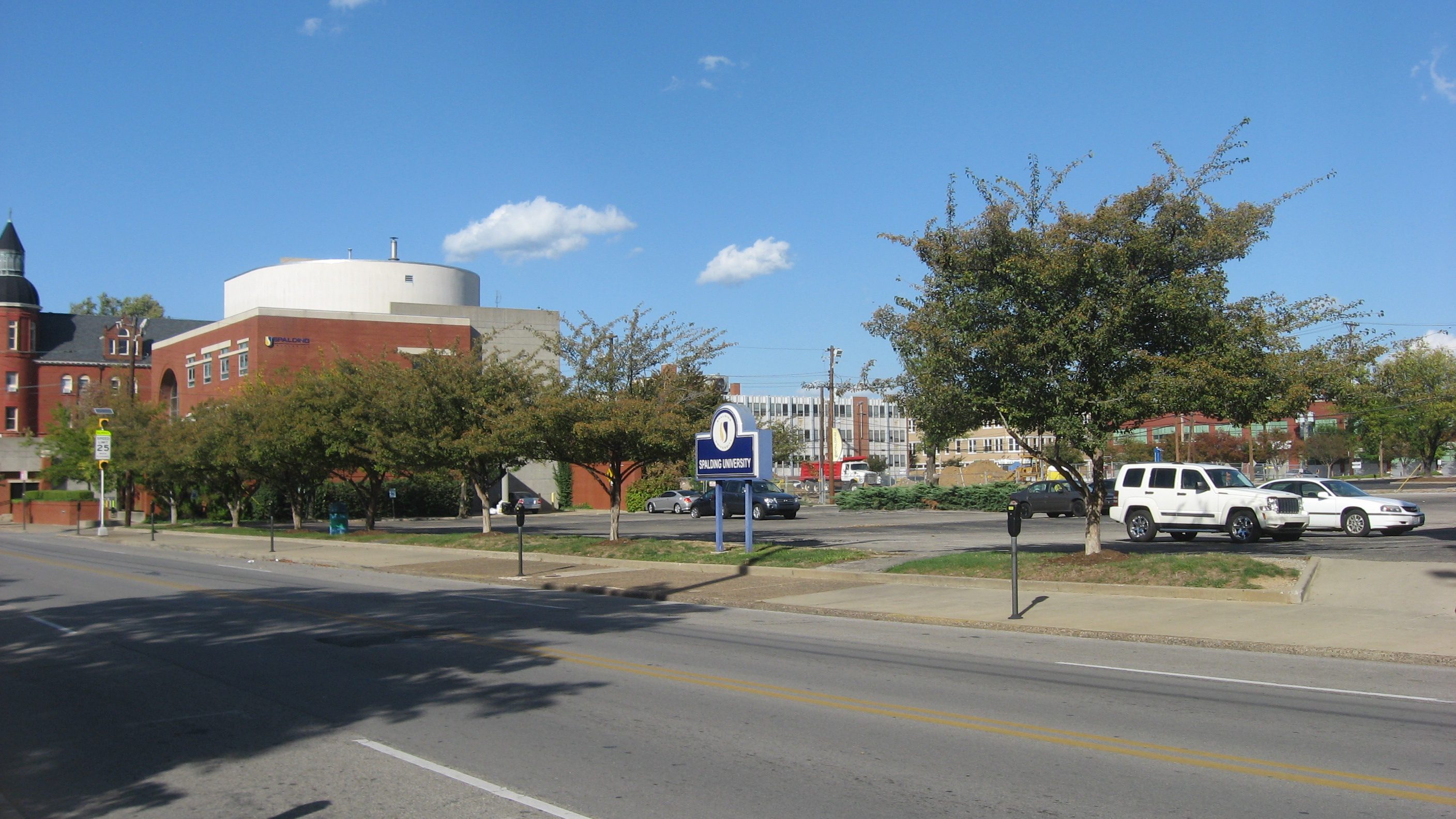
Site of the house

The house was built for Charles C. Porter, a milliner, sometime during 1869–1875, but Porter had to mortgage the house by 1876. The mortgage-holder, James Todd, eventually acquired the property at a bankruptcy auction, and descendants of Todd seem to have owned and rented out the house until 1929.

In 1979 it was the home of the American Saddle Horse Breeders Association.

The house may have been moved or destroyed.
