= Amphitheatre Auditorium =

Coordinates: 38°13′33″N 85°45′44″W

Amphitheatre Auditorium or just the Auditorium was a theatre building in Louisville, Kentucky, United States at the southwest corner of 4th and Hill Streets. Upon its completion in 1889, the large wooden structure boasted the second-largest stage in the United States. The New York Opera House was the largest stage at the time.

== History ==
The Louisville theater was built with materials from the nearby dismantled remains of the Southern Exposition building, which was located just a block away. It contained over 2,000 electric lights, could seat 3,072, and had a stage was 90 feet across and 60 feet deep. The theater opened on September 23, 1889.

The theater was operated by philanthropist William Norton Jr., who went by the name Daniel Quilp, a villain in Charles Dickens' novel The Old Curiosity Shop. He promoted the auditorium with the phrase "Only for great attractions". Norton also used the theatre as a place for the poor to collect handouts once a week. Upon his death he willed that his theatre workers receive three months' salary. He also gave 900,000 dollars of his estate to the Louisville Baptists' Orphans' Home.

On March 6, 1890, the highly acclaimed opera singer Adelina Patti gave her first performance of a three-day stop in Louisville during a six-city tour in the United States. The theater began having significant success following her performance. The summer season was the most productive.

Many of the day's great actors and political figures performed there, including Edwin Booth, Lawrence Barrett, John Philip Sousa, Theodore Roosevelt, and Booker T. Washington. The theater was part of a large entertainment complex that included a bike riding park, a man-made lagoon, a promenade, and a ten-thousand-seat outdoor amphitheatre used for fireworks shows, including The Last Days of Pompei and Americus.

After Norton's death in 1903, no buyers could be found for the Auditorium or surrounding attractions. The last event, the Children's Floral Ball, was held on April 30, 1904. Later, the site was purchased for $900 and razed on May 5, 1905, only 16 years after its completion.

== See also ==
- History of Louisville, Kentucky
