= Central Park, Louisville =

Municipal park in Louisville, Kentucky

Central Park
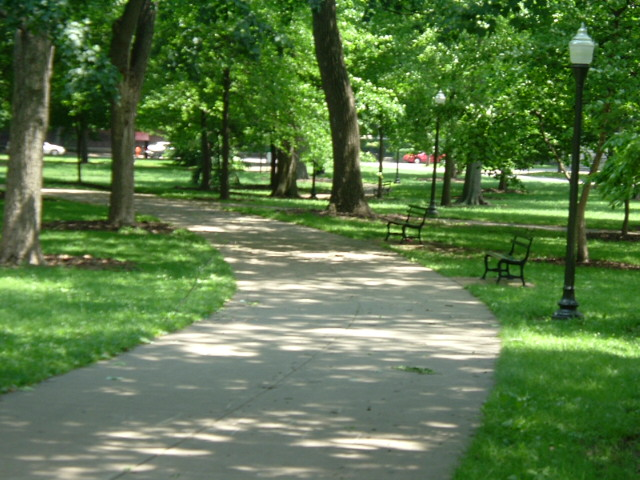
- Walking trails in Central Park
- Interactive map of Central Park
- Type: Urban park
- Location: 1340 S 4th Street, Louisville, Kentucky
- Coordinates: 38.229194°N 85.763088°W
- Area: 17 acres (0.069 km^{2})
- Created: 1872
- Operator: Louisville Metro Parks
- Status: Open
- Website: City's park webpage

Central Park is a 17-acre (69,000 m^{2}) municipal park maintained by the city of Louisville, Kentucky. Located in the Old Louisville neighborhood, it was originally the country estate of the DuPont family. Early in its existence, the park was the site of the Southern Exposition, but later became mostly known for hosting the Kentucky Shakespeare Festival and northern portions of the annual St. James Court Art Show.

== History ==
Interest in developing park space for Louisville's growing population arose in the late 1860s, but it was not until the DuPonts decided to open the front lawn of their estate to the public on June 15, 1872, that the city earned its first park. Although first open only during warm months, it became immensely popular. The first known production of a Shakespeare play in the park took place on July 1, 1895, when a national touring company presented As You Like It in the area where the Kentucky Shakespeare Festival's stage is now located.

During the 1883 Southern Exposition in, 13 of the park's 17 acres (69,000 m^{2}) were temporarily "roofed in" and used to showcase Thomas Edison's light bulb, one of the first large-scale public displays of the invention. In 1885 the park was unroofed, and was instead used as an outdoor exposition, with an Edison-designed electric trolley line transporting visitors around the park to see such sites as a roller coaster, bicycle trails, and an art museum surrounded by a lake.

The park's future became less certain after the 1893 murder of Alfred DuPont. In the late 1890s, after Alfred's brother Biderman moved to Delaware, the family sought to sell the estate to the city for a permanent park space, but negotiations dragged on and the family began making plans to subdivide it into building lots. Around that time the city renamed the park DuPont Square, perhaps to encourage the family to keep it a park, but the name never stuck. Louisville ultimately purchased the old estate for $297,500 in 1904 (equivalent to $10,660,416.67 in 2025).

The DuPonts had made contingency plans for a public park on their property as early as 1883. In 1901, they hired nationally renowned landscape architect Frederick Law Olmsted to draw up a ground plan. Those plans finally came to fruition in 1904–05 when the old DuPont mansion was demolished and the basic outlines of the park as seen today were put into place. At the time, the Spanish mission style of architecture was in vogue, and Olmsted's firm used it in its design for an open-air women and children's shelter and a gymnasium for men and boys. This building is one of few of Spanish Mission style structures in the city. He also created a wading pool and athletic fields. The original walking trails from Louisville's 1883 Southern Exposition, which spilled over into the DuPont estate, were kept in place.

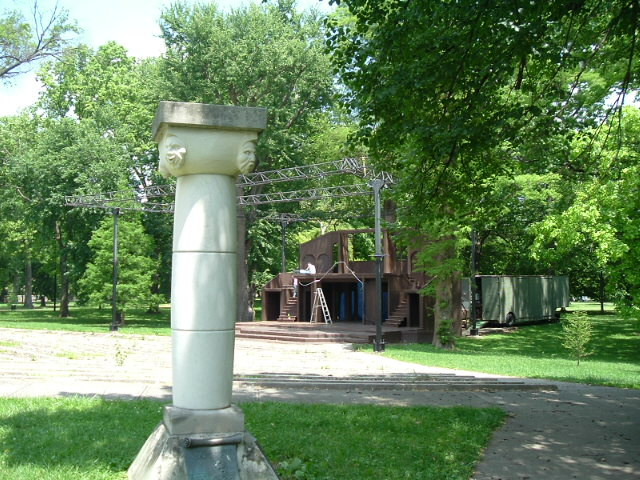
The playhouse at Central Park

In 1970, the gymnasium, by then long gone, was turned into a police station. A few years later, the shelter was radically altered. Its windows were filled in with concrete block and stucco and a drop ceiling installed to cover up the yellow pine ceiling so that it could become an enclosed meeting place for the Old Louisville Neighborhood Council and other neighborhood associations. In 1976, an amphitheater and wooden playhouse were built, which have been used to host the annual Kentucky Shakespeare Festival since.

In 2004, the park celebrated its centennial. Over the last ten years, due to the financial contributions of the Old Louisville Neighborhood Council, neighborhood associations, and several neighborhood philanthropists, the old women and children's shelter has been restored. The park now hosts the Old Louisville LIVE concert series, Jazz in Central Park, and an annual Halloween event called Victorian Tales of Terror.

== Facilities ==
Besides the C. Douglass Ramey Amphitheater, where the Kentucky Shakespeare Festival is held, the park also includes the Historic Old Louisville Visitors Center and the Fourth Precinct station of the Louisville Metro Police Department. The park also includes tennis courts, a playground, and a sprayground.

== See also ==
- History of Louisville, Kentucky
- List of attractions and events in the Louisville metropolitan area
- List of parks in the Louisville metropolitan area
