= Kentucky Shakespeare Festival =

Non-profit professional theatre company in Louisville, Kentucky

Kentucky Shakespeare Festival is a non-profit, professional theatre company in Louisville, Kentucky that produces and performs the works of William Shakespeare. The main productions offered are the annual summer series of plays presented free to the public at the C. Douglass Ramey Amphitheater in the city's Central Park. This series, commonly called "Shakespeare in Central Park", sprung from an initial production in the park by The Carriage House Players in the summer of 1960. They also perform shows in other venues, as well as conduct educational programs related to acting and other theater-related skills.

== Educational programming ==
=== Camp Shakespeare ===
Programs consist of theatre instruction combined with competitions, games, and activities designed to engage the campers. Summers often include field trips and will culminate in an invited performance, or "Share Day", for family and friends showcasing what the campers have been working on during their session.

== See also ==
- List of attractions and events in the Louisville metropolitan area
