= Southern Exposition =

Series of world's fairs in Louisville, Kentucky (1883–1887)

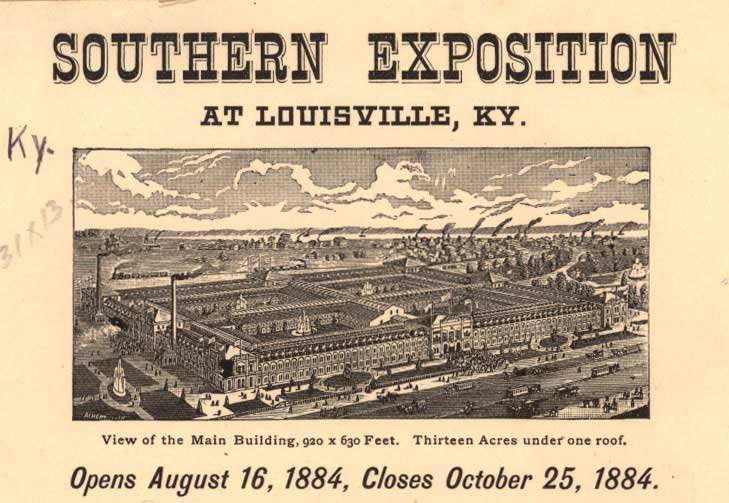
- Portion of poster for 1884 Southern Exposition

Overview
- BIE-class: Unrecognized exposition
- Name: Southern Exposition
- Area: 45 acres (180,000 m^{2})

Location
- Country: United States
- City: Louisville, Kentucky
- Venue: Louisville's Old Louisville neighborhood.

The Southern Exposition was a five-year series of world's fairs held in Louisville, Kentucky, from 1883 to 1887 in what became Louisville's Old Louisville neighborhood. The exposition, held for 100 days each year on 45 acres (180,000 m^{2}) immediately south of Central Park in what became the St. James–Belgravia Historic District, was essentially an industrial and mercantile show. At the time, the exposition was larger than any previous American exhibition with the exception of the Centennial Exposition in Philadelphia in 1876. U.S. President Chester A. Arthur opened the first annual exposition on August 1, 1883.

== Highlights ==
One highlight of the show was the largest installation yet, of incandescent light bulbs, recently invented by Thomas Edison (a resident of Louisville sixteen years earlier), to bring light to the exposition in the nighttime. The contract with the Louisville Board of Trade was for 5,000 incandescent lamps, 4,600 lamps for the exhibition hall and 400 for an art gallery. More than all the lamps installed in New York City at the time were used.

George H. Yater writes in his book Two Hundred Years at the Fall of the Ohio:

The Exposition was the first large space lighted by incandescence and many electrical pioneers felt that the Louisville success did more to stimulate the growth of interior electric lighting than any other Edison plant.

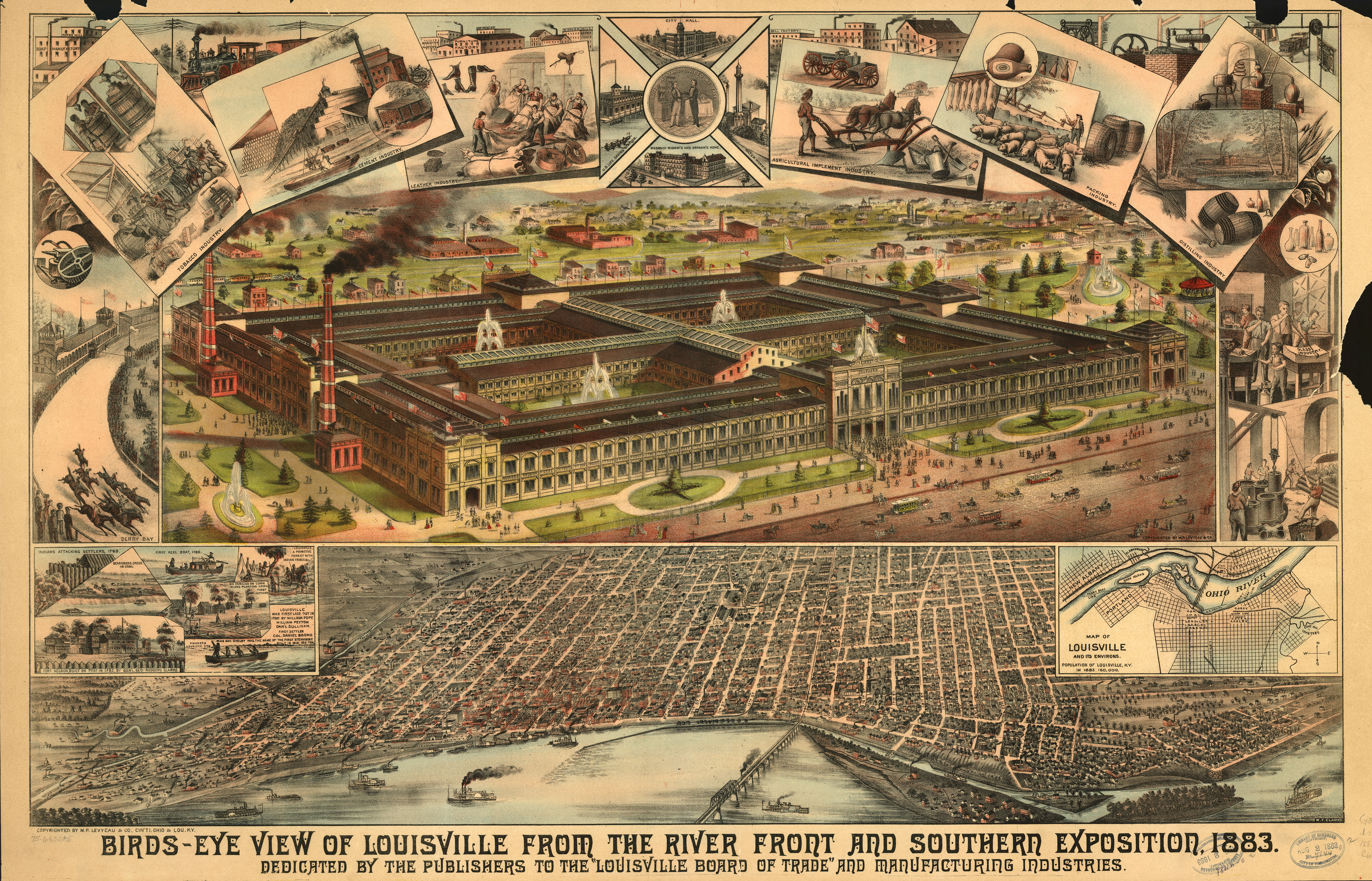
"Birds-eye view of Louisville from the river front and Southern Exposition, 1883" by William F. Clarke

== See also ==
- Amphitheatre Auditorium, built with materials from the nearby dismantled remains of the Southern Exposition building
- St. James Court Art Show, held in the same location
