= Theodore Scowden =

American architect

Theodore Ransom Scowden (June 8, 1815, Pennsylvania – December 31, 1881, Cleveland, Ohio) was an engineer and architect. He designed the Louisville Water Tower with his assistant Charles Hermany. He also designed waterworks for Cleveland and Cincinnati.

He was the son of Theodore Scowden II and Sarah Ransom Hazard of Pittsburgh, Pennsylvania, and was educated at Augusta College in Kentucky.

His designs for the Louisville Water Works may have been based on Philadelphia's Fairmount Water Works (1812). The design is described as being an example of Palladian architecture. The buildings were renovated for conversion into the Louisville WaterWorks Museum.
