= Louisville Water Tower =

- Louisville Water Company Pumping Station
- U.S. National Register of Historic Places
- U.S. National Historic Landmark
- Location: Louisville, Kentucky
- Coordinates: 38°16′50″N 85°42′4″W
- Built: 1860
- Architect: Scowden, Theodore R.
- Architectural style: Classical Revival
- NRHP reference No.: 71000348

Significant dates
- Added to NRHP: November 11, 1971
- Designated NHL: November 11, 1971

The Louisville Water Tower, located east of downtown Louisville, Kentucky, near the riverfront, is the oldest ornamental water tower in the world, having been built before the more famous Chicago Water Tower. Both the actual water tower and its pumping station are a designated National Historic Landmark for their architecture. As with the Fairmount Water Works of Philadelphia (designed 1812, built 1819–22), the industrial nature of its pumping station was disguised in the form of a Roman temple complex.

In 2014, the Louisville WaterWorks Museum opened on the premises.

== History ==
Unknown to residents at the time, the lack of a safe water supply presented a significant health risk to the city. After the arrival of the second cholera pandemic in the United States (1832), Louisville in the 1830s and 40s gained the nickname "graveyard of the west", due to the polluted local water giving Louisville residents cholera and typhoid at epidemic levels. This was because residents used the water of tainted private wells, but the linkage was not discovered until 1854 by the English physician John Snow, and not accepted as fact until decades later. Due to the water project's completion in 1866, Louisville was free of cholera during the epidemic of 1873.

After several devastating fires in the 1850s, Louisvillians were convinced of the importance of the project. The decision was made by the Kentucky Legislature to form the Louisville Water Company on March 6, 1854. Private investors showed little interest and so after only 55 shares had been sold and the failure of a first attempt to secure voter approval to buy shares, the project was widely promoted. In 1856 voters approved purchase of 5500 shares in 1856, and another 2200 shares in 1859, transforming it into an almost completely government-owned corporation.

The inspiration for the architecture of Louisville's Water Tower came from the French architect Claude Nicolas Ledoux, who merged "architectural beauty with industrial efficiency". It was decided to render the water station an ornament to the city, to make skeptical Louisvillians more accepting of a water company. Theodore Scowden and his assistant Charles Hermany were the architects of the structures. They chose an area just outside town, on a hill overlooking the Ohio River, which provided excellent elevation. The location also meant that coal boats could easily deliver the coal necessary to operate the station. The main column, of the Doric order, rises 183 feet (55.8 m) out of a Corinthian portico surrounding its base. The portico is surmounted by a wooden balustrade with ten pedestals also constructed of wood, originally supporting painted cast-zinc statues from J. W. Fiske & Company, ornamental cast-iron manufacturers of New York. Even the reservoir's gatehouse on the riverfront invoked the castles along the Rhine.

The water tower began operations on October 16, 1860. The tower was not just pretty; it was effective. In 24 hours the station could produce 12 million US gallons (45,000 m^{3}) of water. This water, in turn, flowed through 26 miles (42 km) of pipe.

A tornado on March 27, 1890 irreparably changed the Water Tower. The original water tower had an iron pipe protected by a wood-paneled shaft, but after the tornado destroyed it, it was replaced with cast iron. The tornado also destroyed all but two of the ten statues that were on the pedestals. Shortly thereafter, a new pumping station and reservoirs were built in Crescent Hill, and the original water tower ceased pumping operations in 1909. The pumping station was renovated in 2010.

In January 2013, extensive renovations of the water tower property, including the addition of the Louisville WaterWorks Museum, began, and the museum opened on March 1, 2014.

== Statues ==
There are ten zinc statues above the first level's balustrade, each standing on a pedestal over a Corinthian column. They are listed clockwise below with identifiable features:

- An Indian hunter: a tomahawk and a dog on a leash. He represents possibly the element earth.
- A Danaide: emptying a large amphora on her raised leg. She represents "tasks that are never complete".
- Mercury: winged helmet.
- Winter: headscarf, censer of flame in hand. (The four seasons here are all women.)
- Hebe: raising a small jug above her head, a cup in the other hand.
- Neptune: a trident.
- Spring: a flower bud in one hand, a basket in another.
- Flora: a wreath in her hand.
- Summer: shielding her eyes from the sun with her hand.
- Autumn: a plate of harvest, grapes in her hair.

The statues were originally urns in the plans. The first set of statues included Ceres, Diana, and a girl in a bonnet.

== Gallery ==
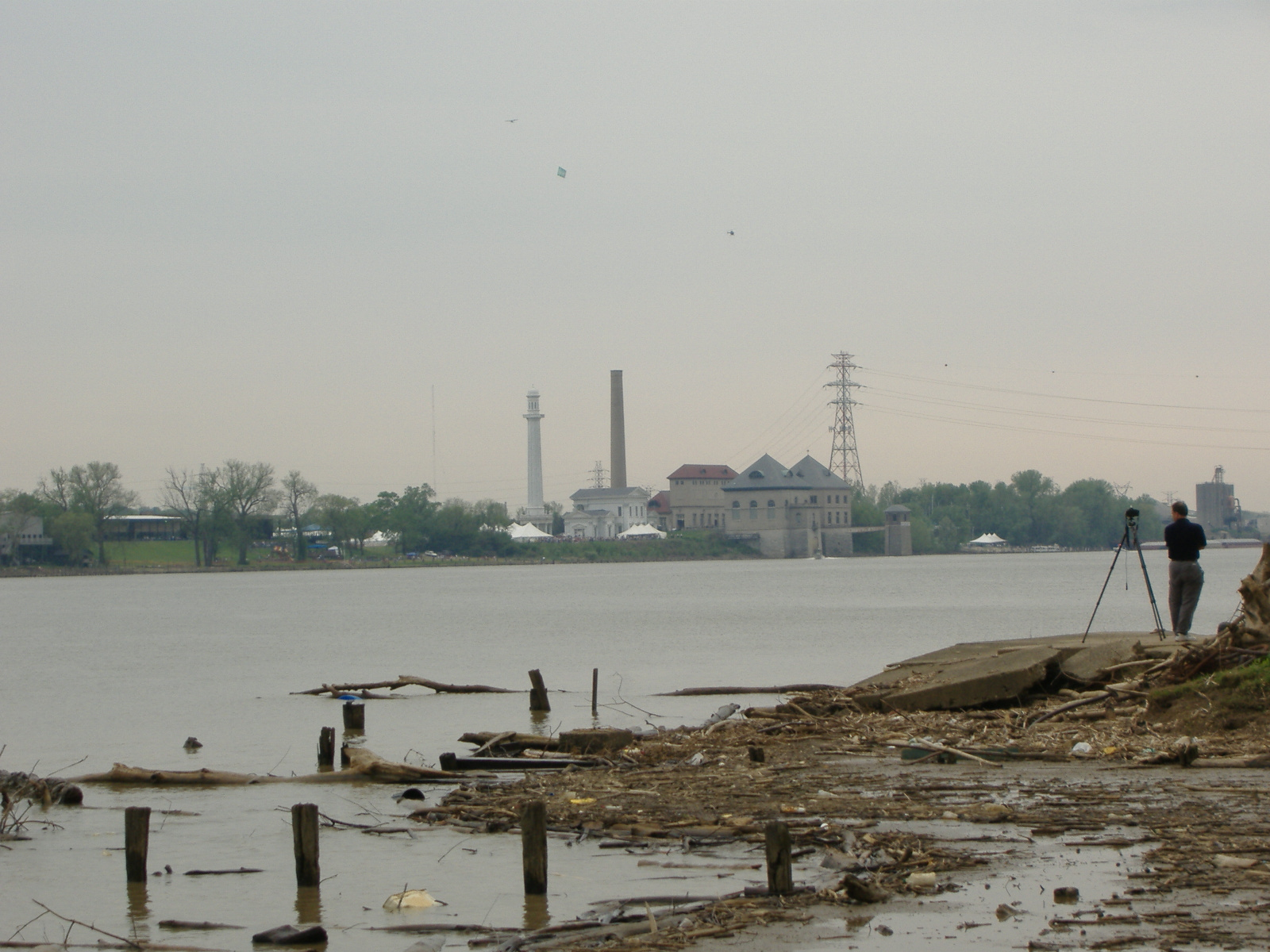
View of the tower from Duffy's Landing in Jeffersonville, Indiana

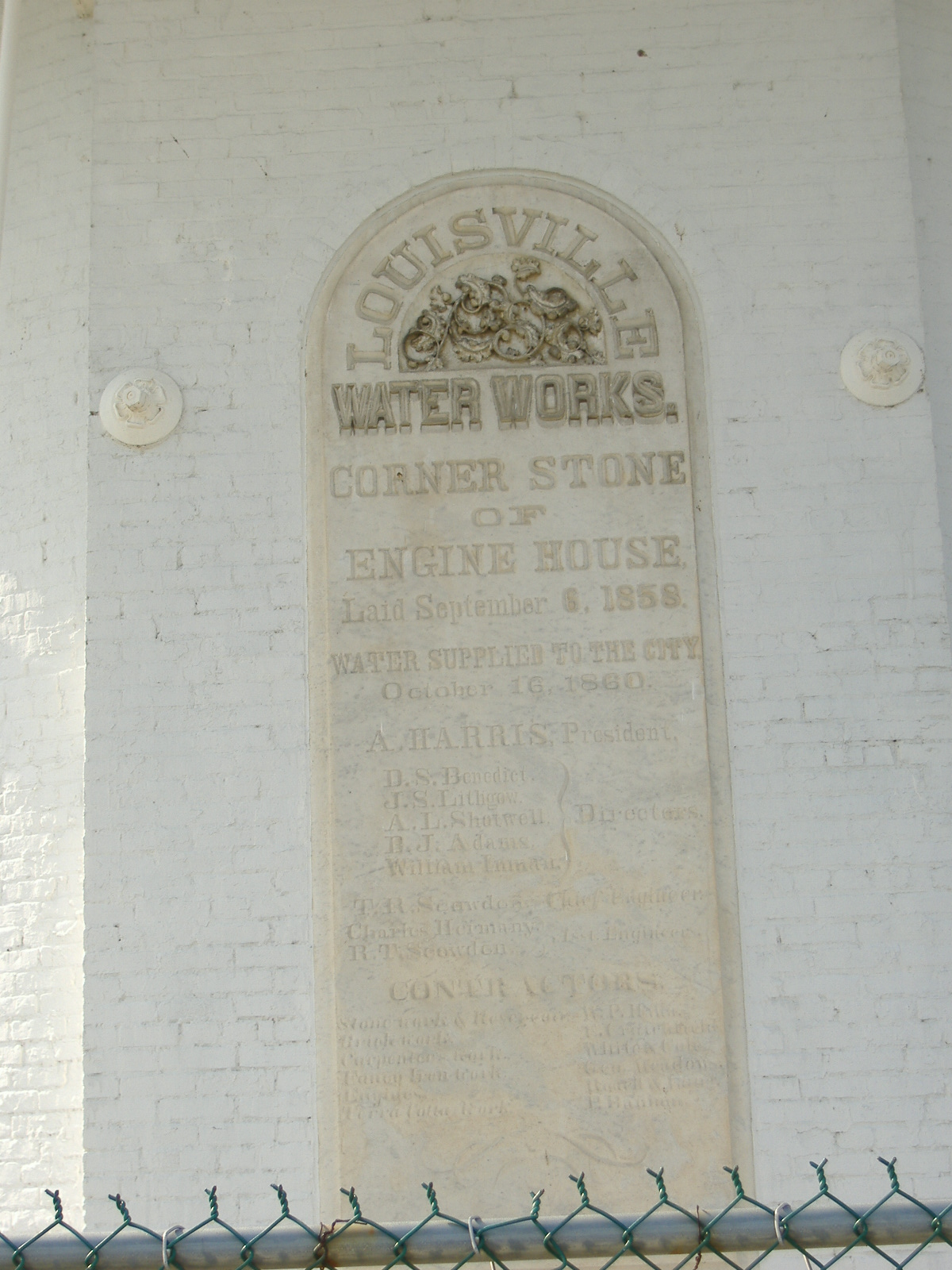
Inscription upon the tower

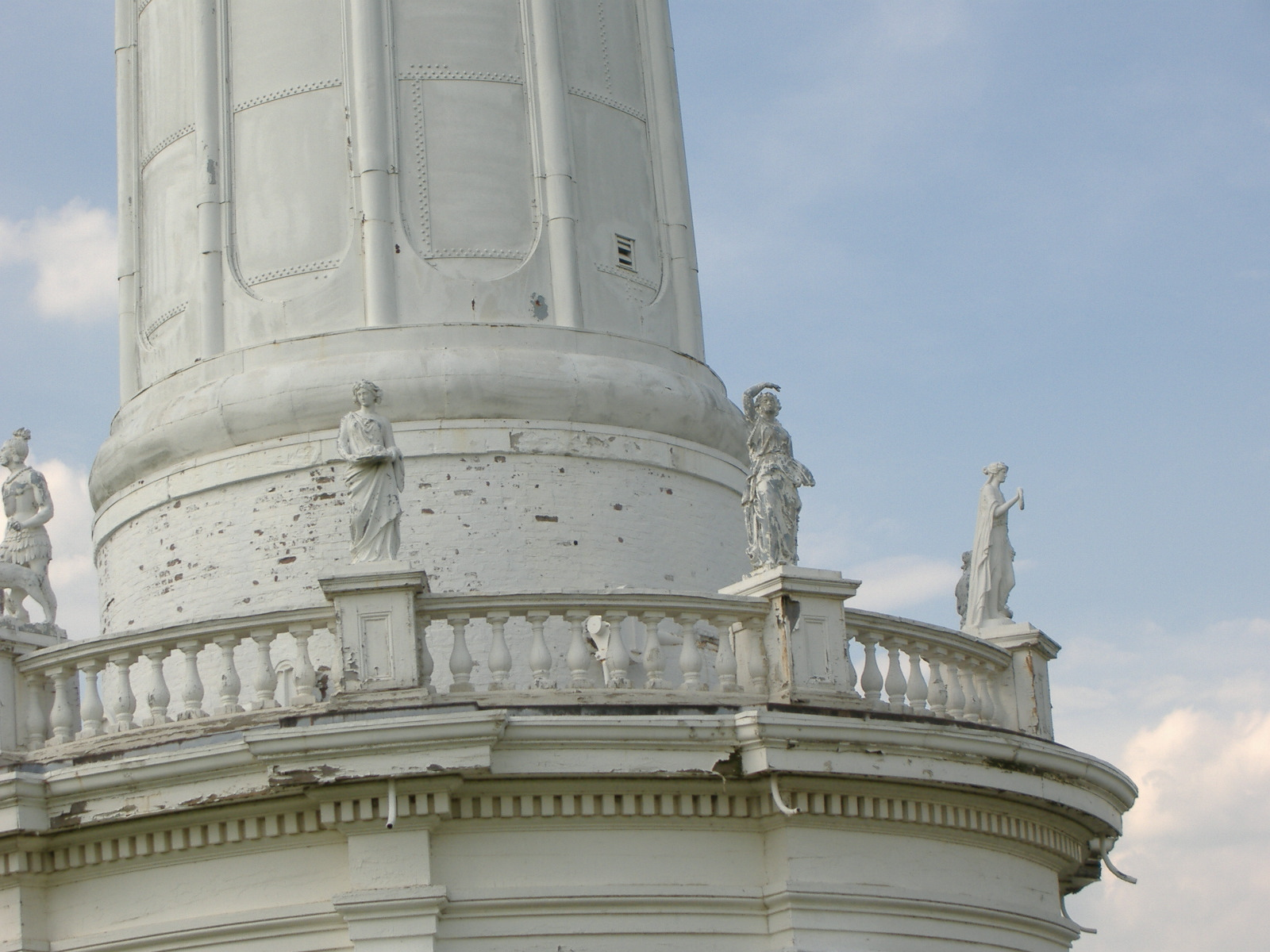
The Indian, Autumn, Summer, and Flora

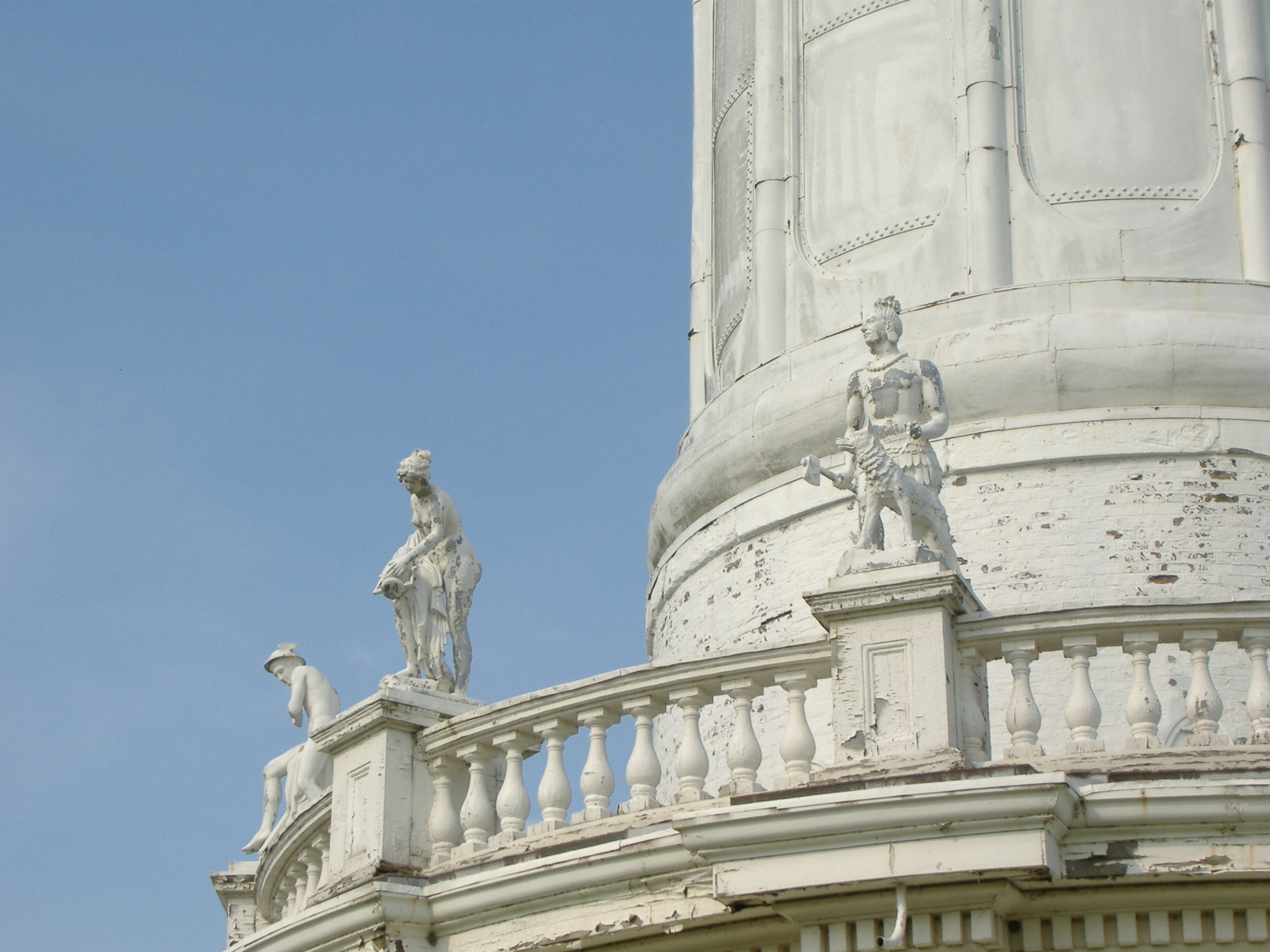
Mercury, the Danaide, and the Indian

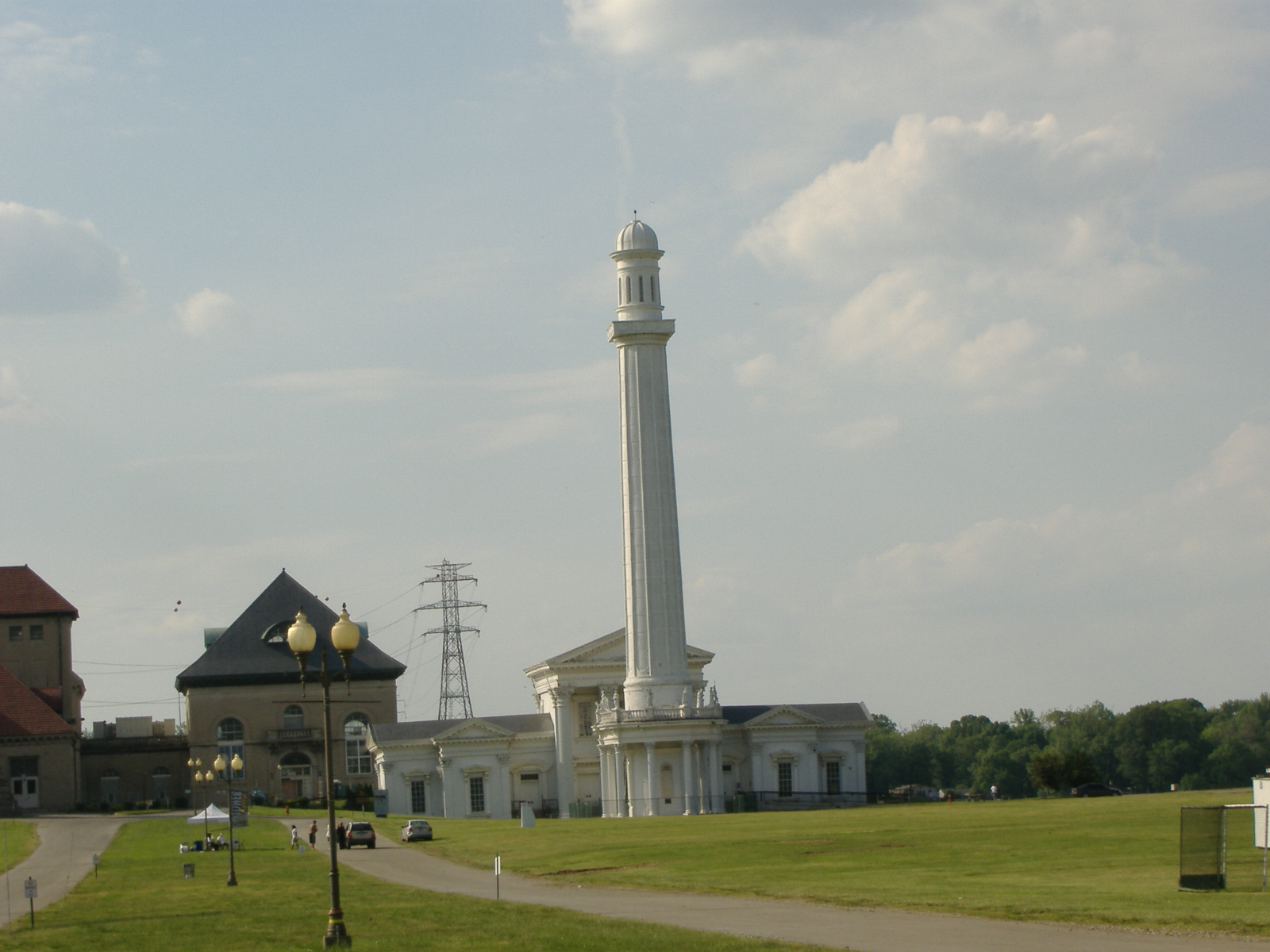
A view from Zorn Avenue of the Tower

== See also ==
- Crescent Hill Reservoir
- Cardinal Hill Reservoir
- List of attractions and events in the Louisville metropolitan area
- National Register of Historic Places listings in Jefferson County, Kentucky
