= Victor Andre Matteson =

American architect

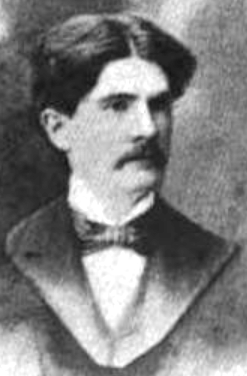
- Born: August 22, 1872; Chicago, Illinois
- Died: March 9, 1951 (aged 78); Chicago, Illinois
- Education: University of Illinois
- Occupation: Architect

Victor Andre Matteson (August 22, 1872 – March 9, 1951) was an American architect. His practice was based in Chicago and LaSalle, Illinois.

His work includes the Cardinal Hill Reservoir (1931) in Jefferson County, Kentucky; the Saginaw Water Works plant in Saginaw, Michigan (1926–1929); the Westclox plant building in Peru, Illinois; and the LaSalle Theater (1912) in LaSalle, Illinois.

Matteson became a member of the American Institute of Architects in 1917. In 1934, he became a Fellow of the American Institute of Architects, an honor reserved for "exceptional work and contributions to architecture and society."

== Early life and education ==
He was born in Chicago, the second son of Andre and Ellen C. (née McNaughton) Matteson, grandson of Zerrubbable and Tryphena (née Whitford) Matteson and great-grandson of William Matteson. His sister was Jean Matteson (1859-1936). Andre's and Ellen's first son was born in 1869, but Guy lived only until the next year.

Matteson received his early schooling at Evanston, Illinois. His technical education started at the Chicago Manual Training School, where he graduated in 1891. He continued in the architectural department of the College of Engineering at the University of Illinois. He was a member of the Kappa Kappa chapter of the Sigma Chi fraternity.

== Career ==
He was trained in offices of prominent Chicago architects: Shepley, Rutan & Coolidge, Jenney & Mundie, and Frost & Granger. During this time he assisted with the planning and construction of the Art Institute, Chicago public library, and a number of large office buildings. He supervised the construction of the LaSalle Street Station.

Having been given so much architectural work by the M&H Zinc Co, in 1903, he moved to LaSalle and opened his office, but continued practicing in Chicago. The Illinois Pavilion of the Lewis & Clark Centennial Exposition in Portland was his work. Nearly all of the newer buildings of importance around LaSalle-Peru are his work. He specialized in hospital planning and traveled to study the architecture of England, France, and Italy. He was the architect of the Spring Valley Hospital in Spring Valley and the St. Joseph's Hospital in Chicago. He was a member of the Illinois Chapter of the American Institute of Architects and the Chicago Architectural Club.

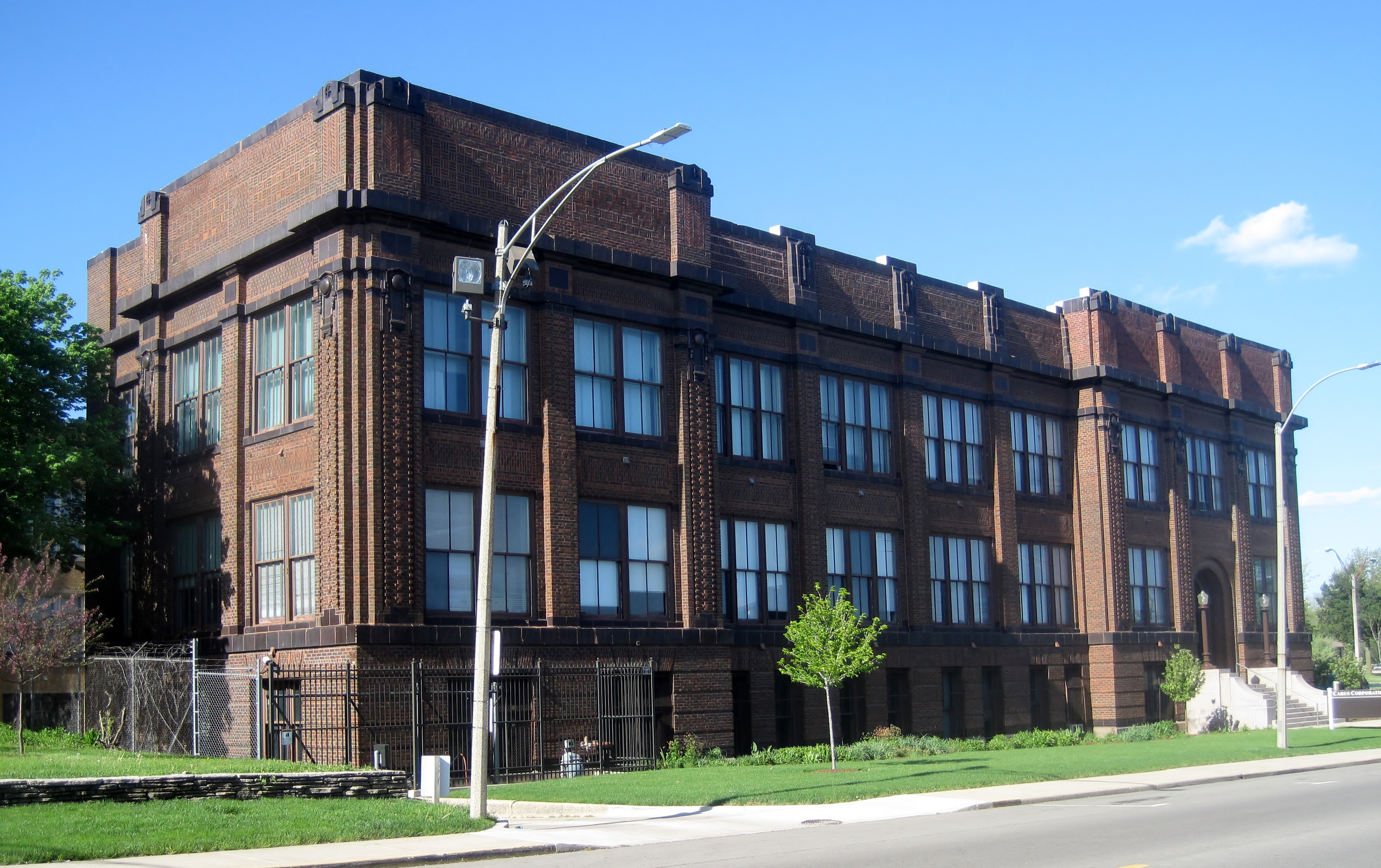
Westclox Administration Building

At the 34th Annual Chicago Architectural Exhibit of 1924, Mattheson was listed in the index: "Matteson, V. A. (Hartford Building, Chicago) Entrance to Home of 'Big Ben', Western Clock Works La Salle, Ill."

Matteson was employed at the firm of Graham, Anderson, Probst & White in Chicago. He spoke at the 1933 dedication of the Three Rivers Water Filtration Plant in Fort Wayne, Indiana. Matteson commented that there is "no more beautiful spot could be wished for than the Three Rivers Park site, affording as it does a splendid view from across the rivers in any direction" and said that "The exterior design of the building is not 'modernistic', but an adaptation of the spirit of the Gothic to modern requirements. Most of the pleasing architectural effect is secured by a careful study of mass and proportion, light and shade, and color… While the effect is rich and massive, befitting the purpose of so important a building to the community, the design is really one of extreme simplicity.”

Matteson was known for his water plant designs. Matteson was a member of the American Water Works Association and had at least twenty years of experience in water plant design before planning the Saginaw Water Works plant in the 1920s. He wrote that "it is economic to give the public beautiful, as well as useful things, especially when one considers that of all the money expended on a complete water system, only about twenty-five percent of the total is applied to works above ground and visible." The Saginaw Water Works plant, designed and built from 1926 to 1929, has been characterized as "beautiful and functional".

Matteson believed in the equal importance of form and function, not just architecture as a fine art. In a 1921 letter to the editor of The American Architect journal, Matteson called for engineering to be included as an integral part of architecture. He wrote that "Architecture should be considered as the combined Art and Science of Building" and urged a closer working relationship between architects and engineers.

== Death and burial ==
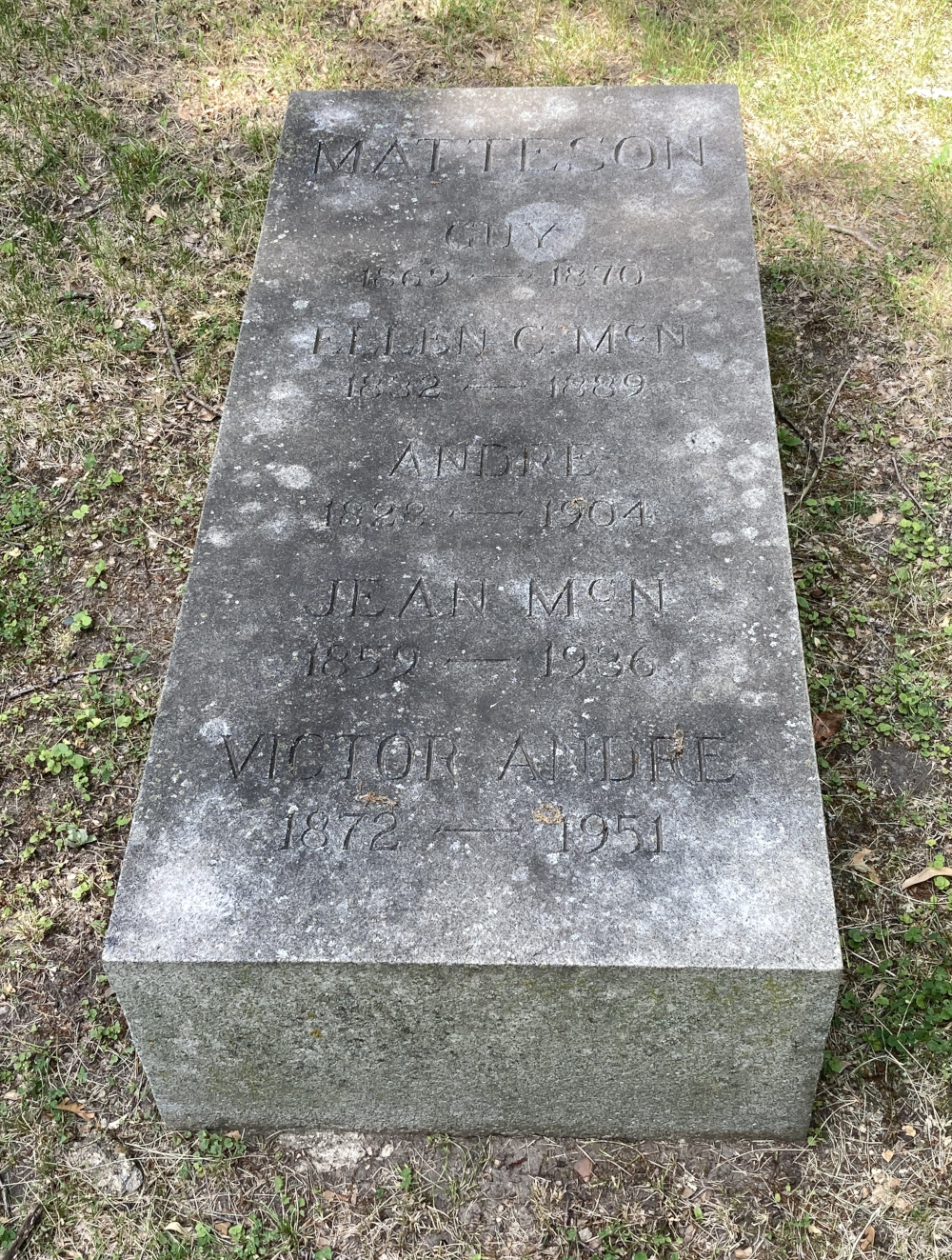
Matteson's grave at Rosehill Cemetery

Matteson died in Chicago on March 9, 1951, at age 78. He is buried in a plot alongside his parents and siblings at the Rosehill Cemetery and Mausoleum in Chicago.

== Selected works ==
LaSalle works:

- LaSalle City Hall
- LaSalle Carnegie Library Building
- LaSalle Theater (1912) – demolished
- Orsinger Building
- Manual Training School
- LaSalle Tribune Headquarters, 225-229 Gooding Street, Illinois
- Koenig Building
- W. E. Fitch Residence
- Thomas Noon Residence
- Matthiessen & Hegeler Zinc Co. General Office

Works near LaSalle, Illinois:

- Westclox plant building in Peru – partially destroyed by fire
- Residence of Walter Ashby in Peru
- Deer Park, the country residence of F.W. Matthiessen near LaSalle - demolished
- Spring Valley Hospital in Spring Valley

Other works:

- St. Joseph's Hospital in Chicago, Illinois
- Illinois Pavilion of the Lewis & Clark Centennial Exposition in Portland, Oregon
- Saginaw Water Works plant in Saginaw, Michigan – Gothic architecture adapted to "modern requirements" with a large central tower enclosing a steel water tank including "interesting detail and stone carvings" covering the history of the site on the tower and along the north and east building faces
- Summer home of Dr. A. Lagorio in Delavan Lake, Wisconsin
- Gate Lodge, summer home of Dr. A. Lagorio in Delavan Lake, Wisconsin
- Cardinal Hill Reservoir (1931), Louisville Water Company in Jefferson County, Kentucky – listed on the National Register of Historic Places – the one-story, stone (ashler) structure includes Doric pilasters, full entablature, parapet wall, shouldered architraves, quoins, and balustraded stairs; lights along front bank of old reservoir set on pedestal bases "with tomb-like structures" holding lights at corners
- Cedar Rapids Water Works Plant (1926)

== Gallery ==
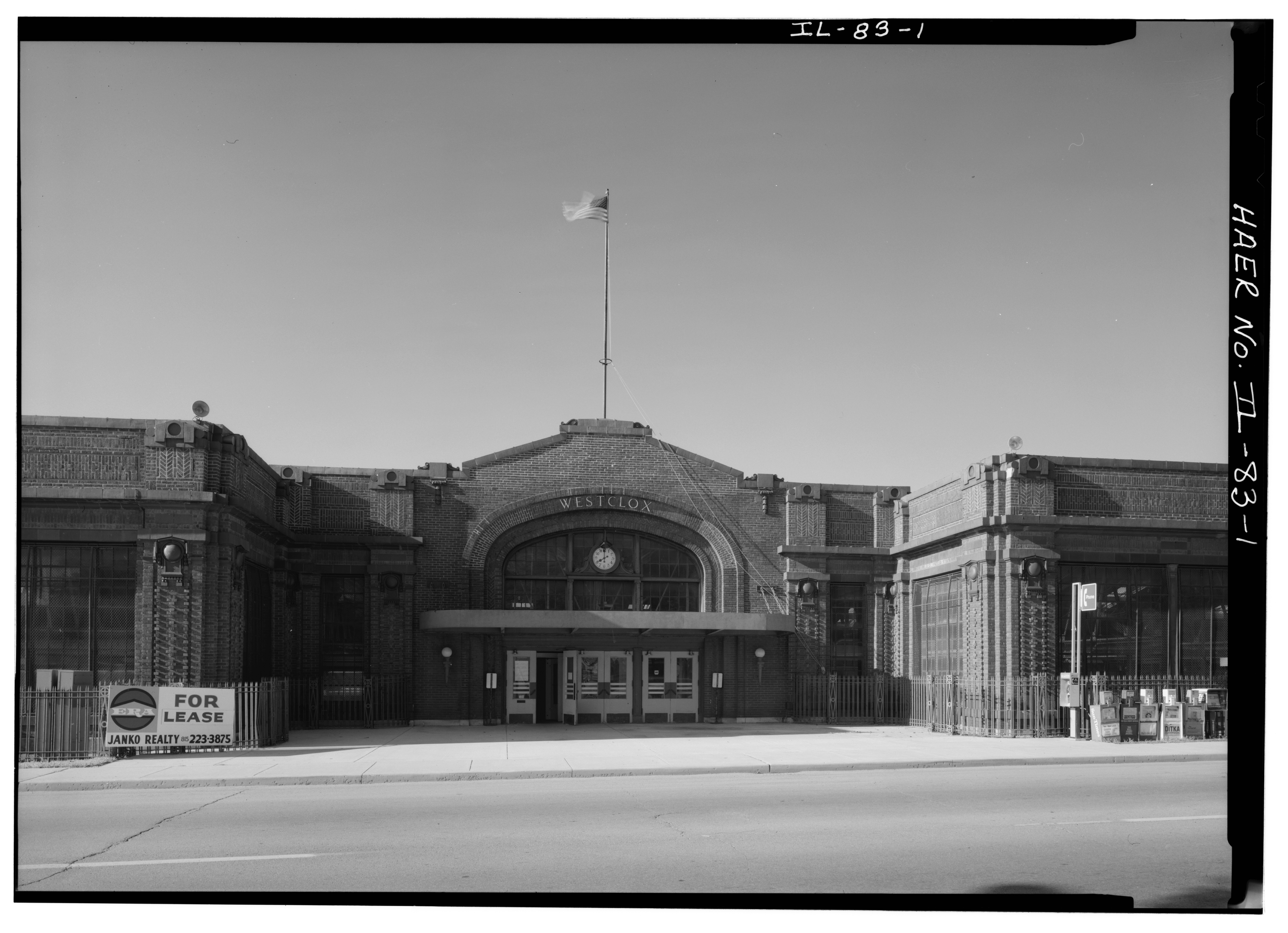
Westclox plant: "Big Ben" entry on north facade, looking south (taken 1960)

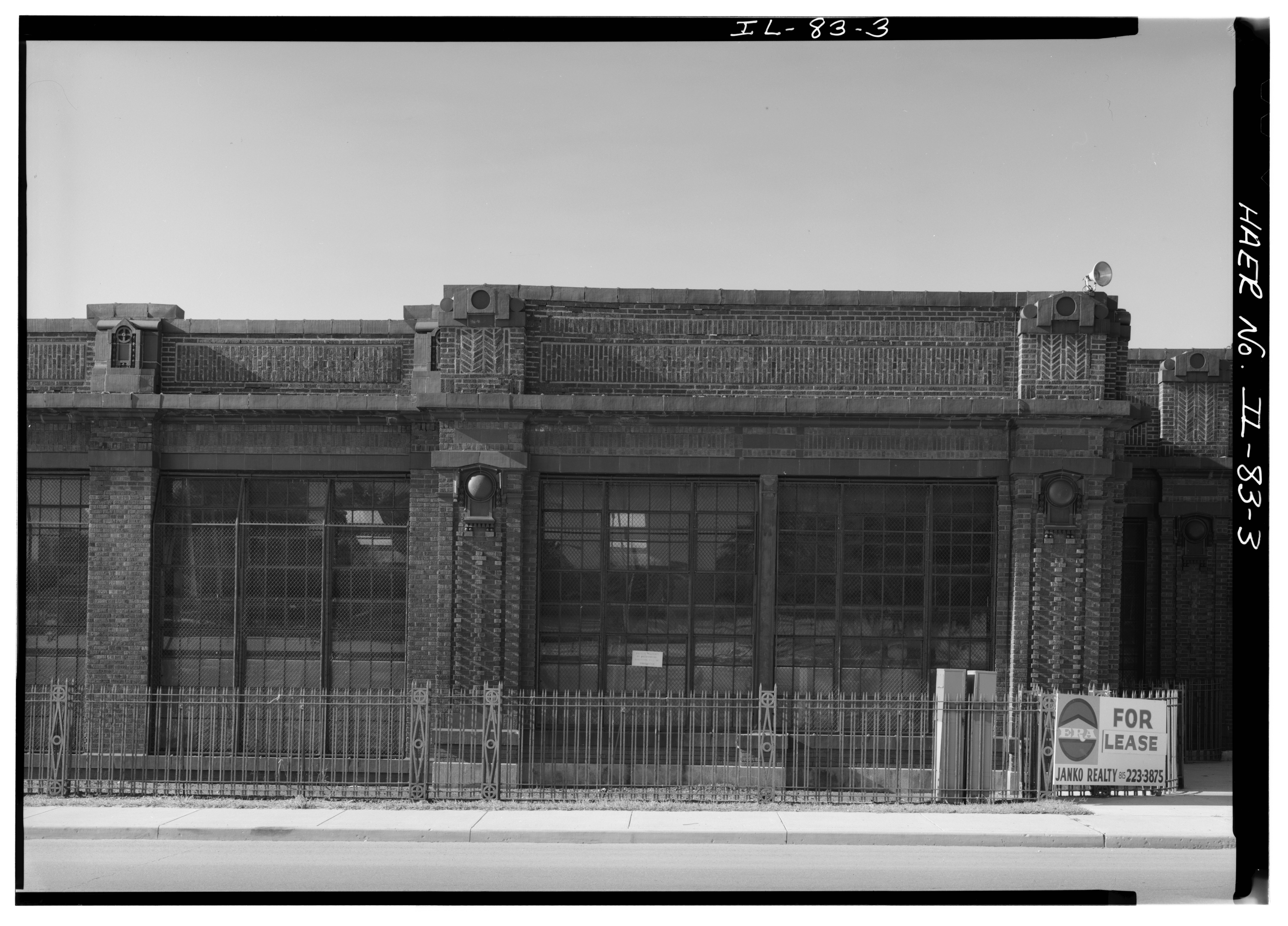
Westclox plant: detail of north facade, looking south (taken 1960)

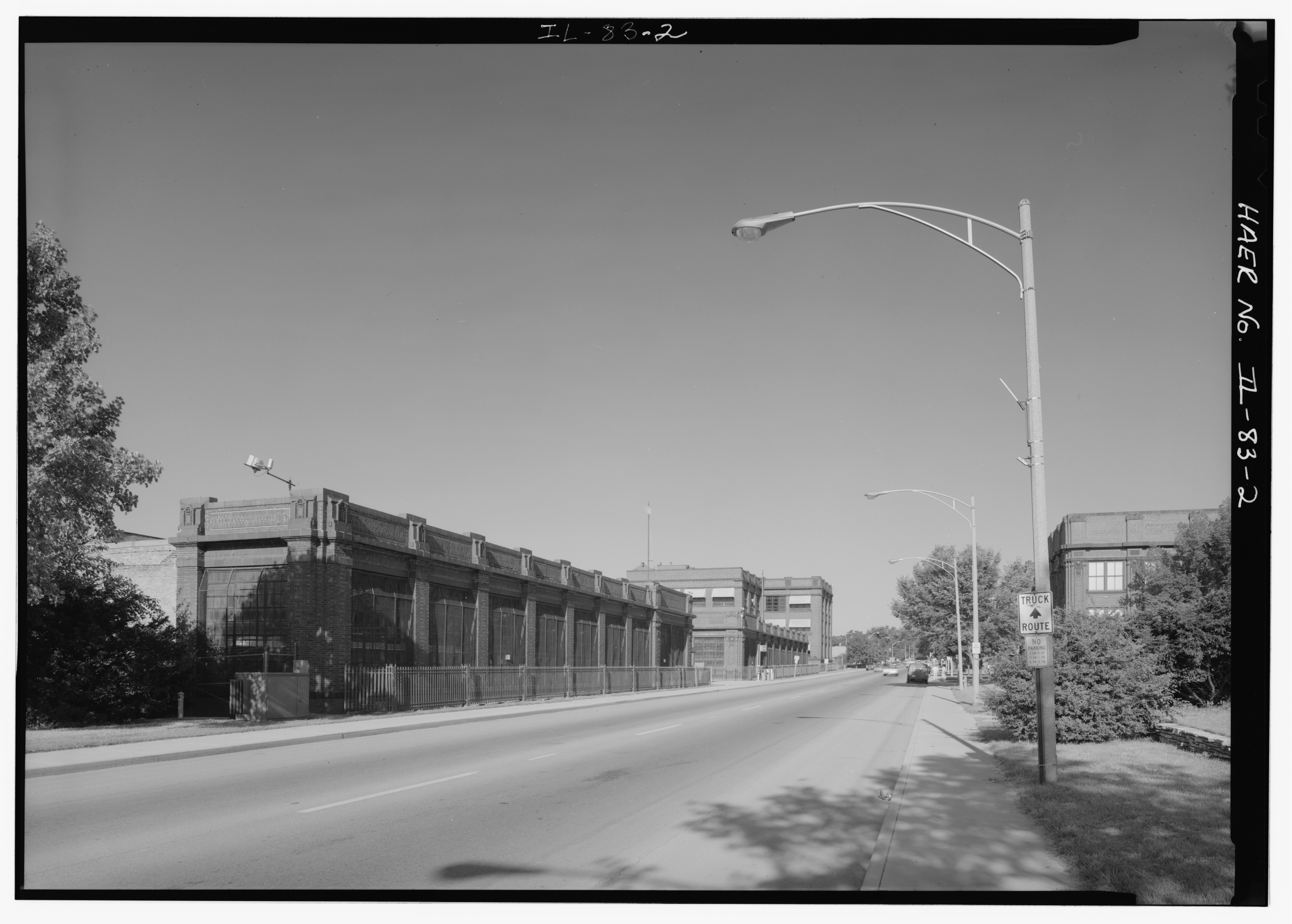
Westclox plant: north facade from the opposite direction (taken 1960)

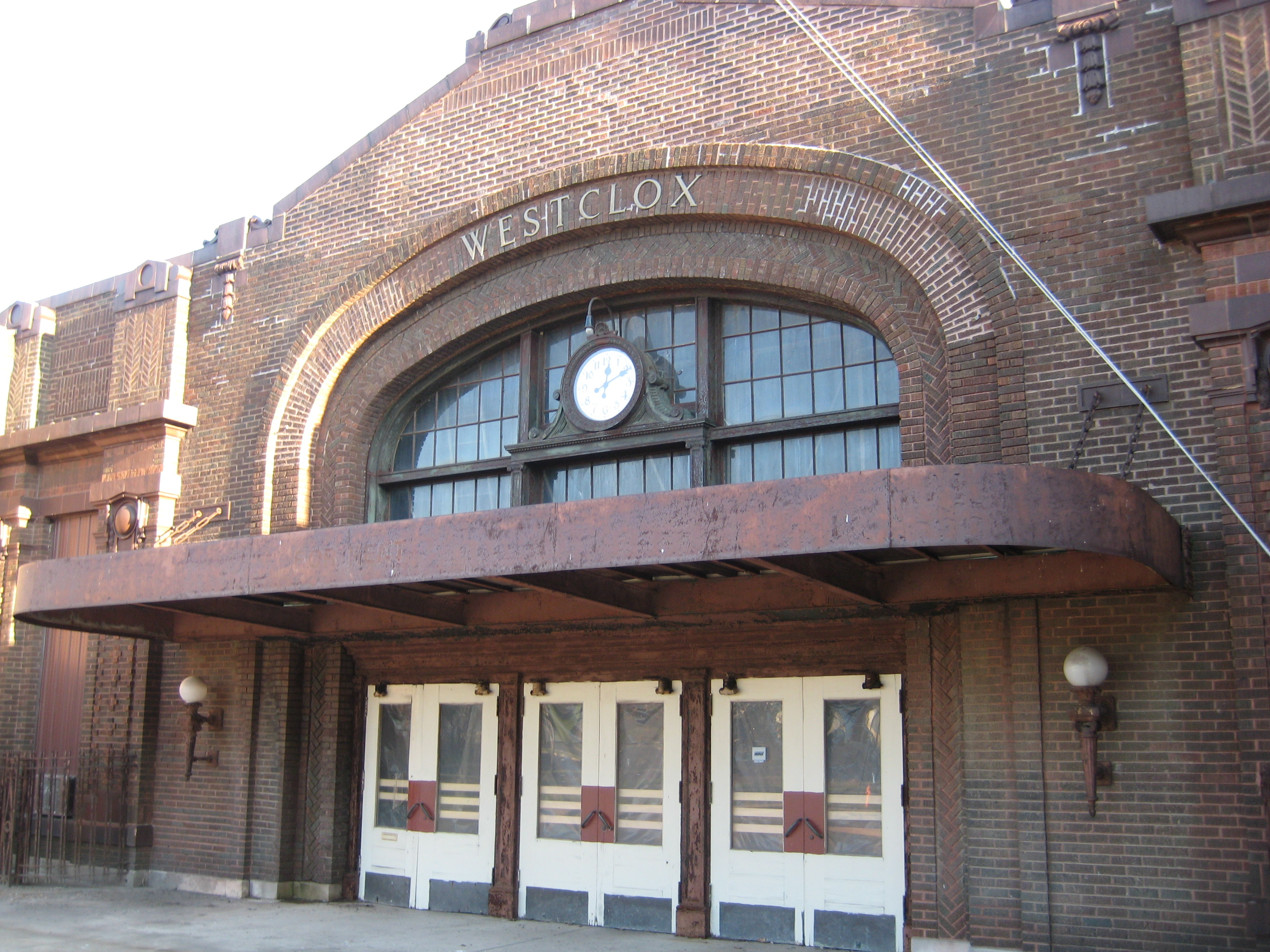
Close-up of Westclox "Big Ben" entrance to the plant (taken 2007)

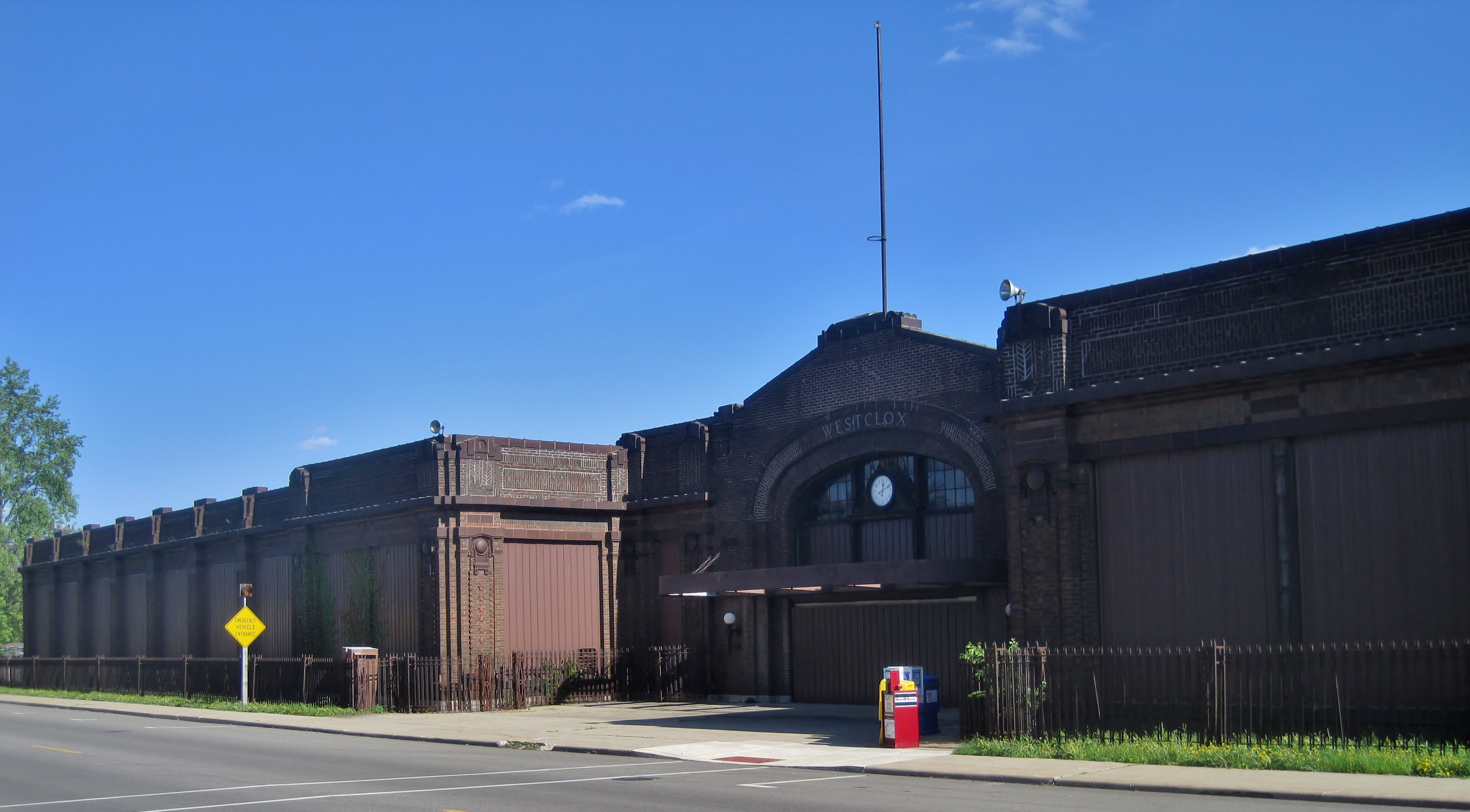
Westclox manufacturing plant (taken 2013)

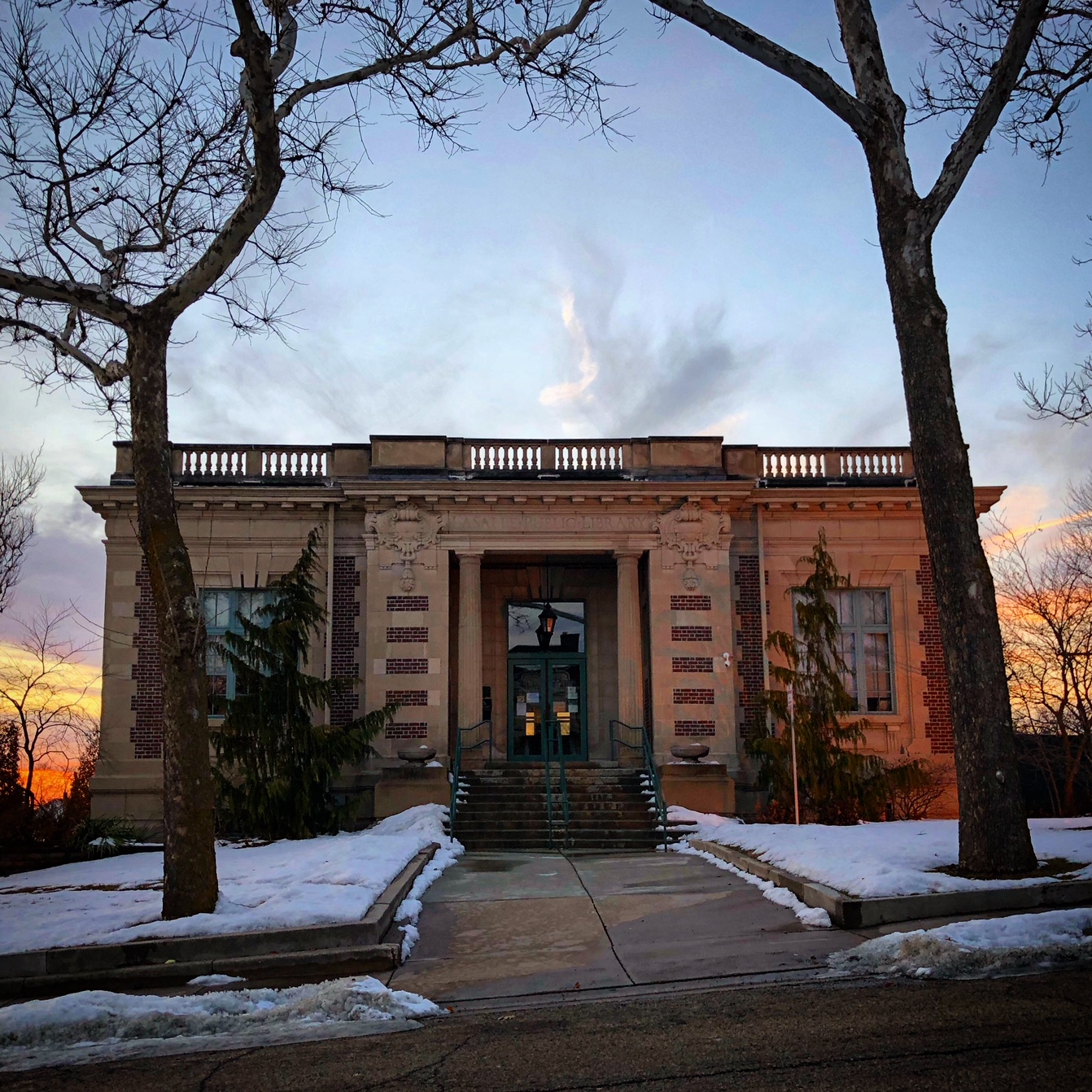
LaSalle Carnegie Library

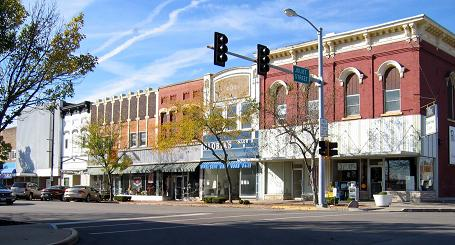
The Orsinger Building (furthest right) and building to its left, both designed by Matteson

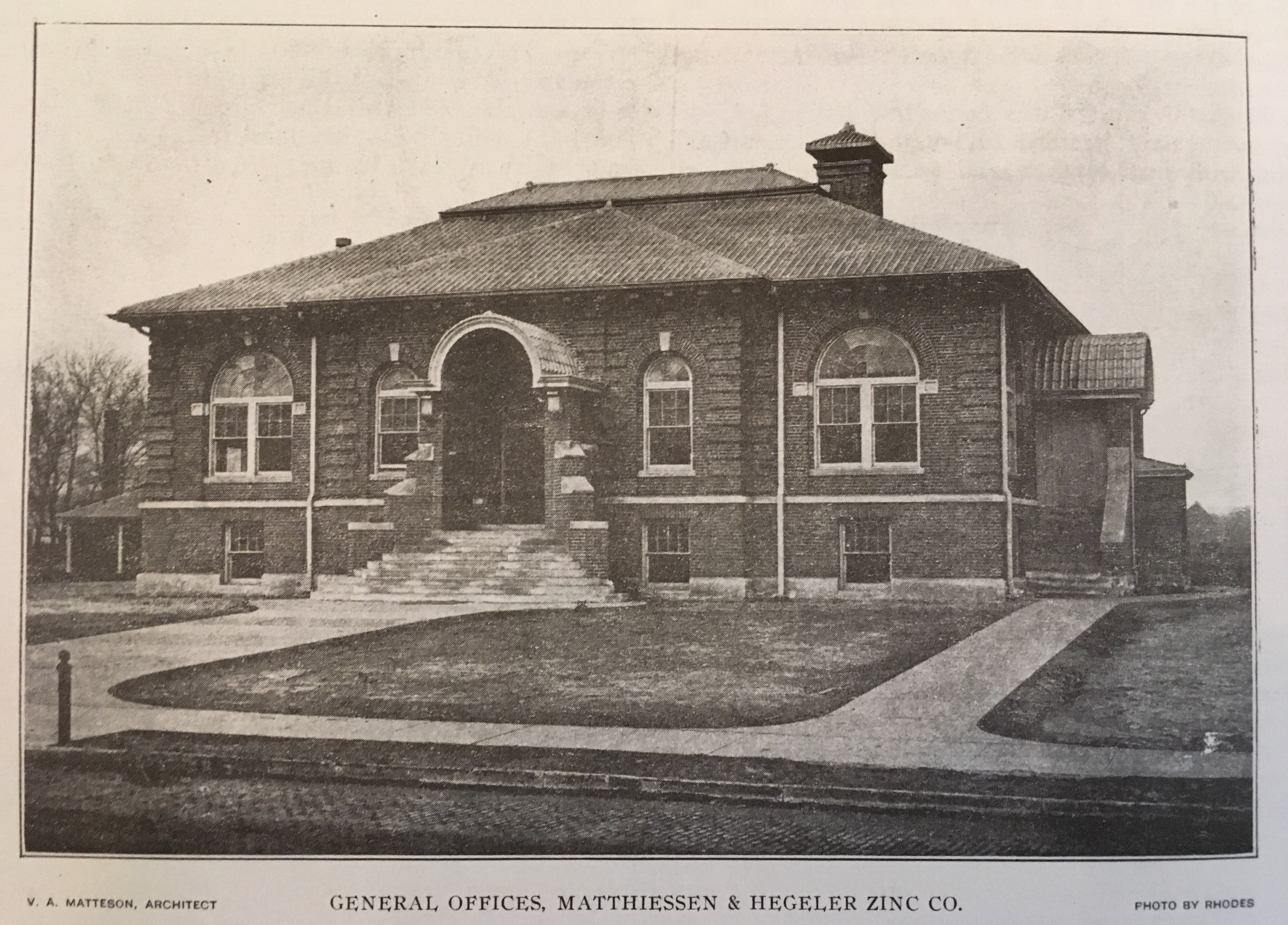
General Office of M&H Zinc Company

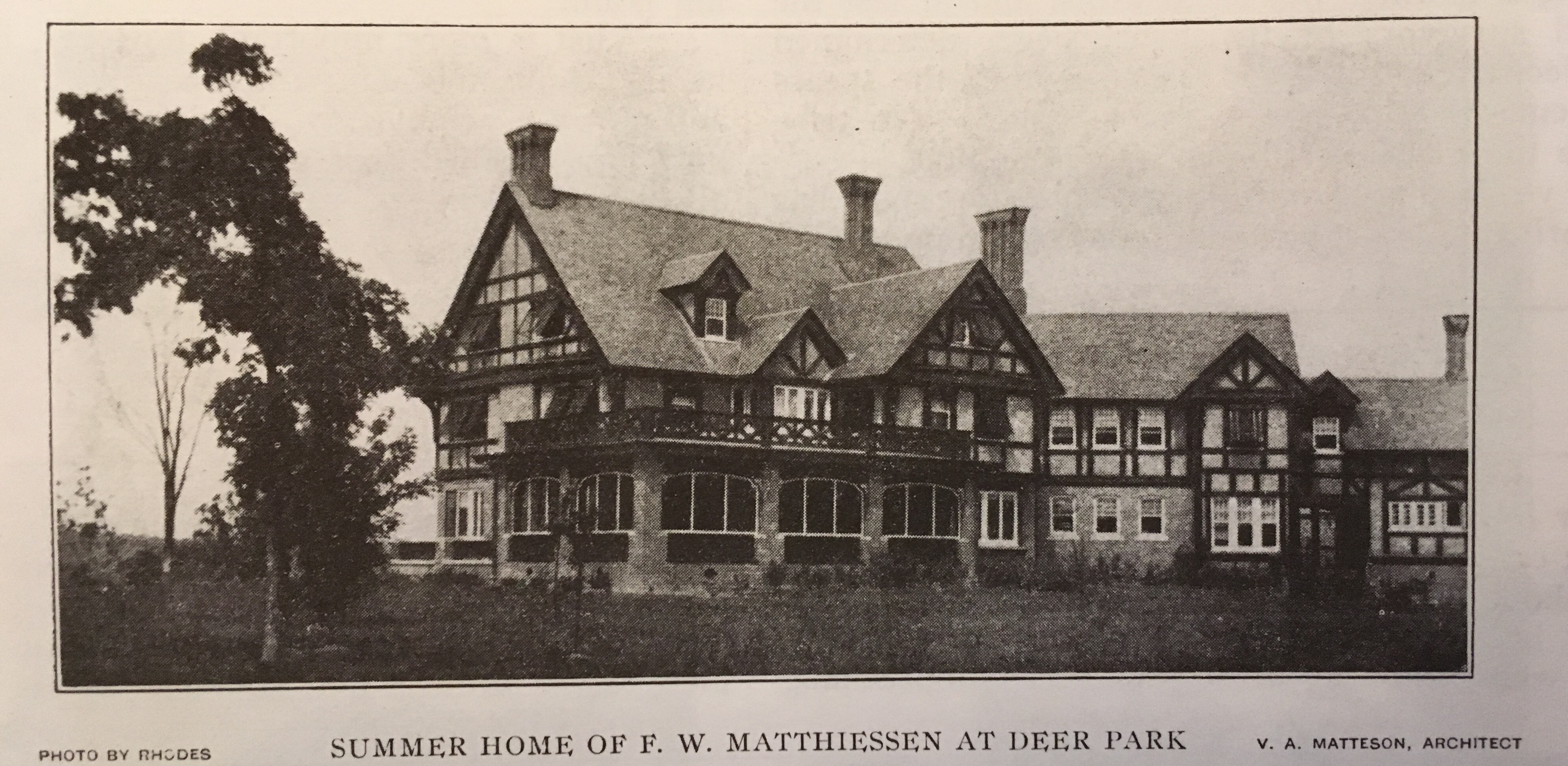
Home of Frederick William Matthiessen at Deer Park

== See also ==
- List of American architects
- List of people from Chicago
