= George Floyd protests in Illinois =

2020 civil unrest after the murder of George Floyd

- Part of George Floyd protests
- Date: May 28 – August 10, 2020 (2 months, 1 week and 6 days)
- Location: Illinois, United States
- Caused by: Police brutality; Institutional racism against African Americans; Reaction to the murder of George Floyd; Economic, racial and social inequality

Cities in Illinois in which a protest with about 100 or more participants was held

There were a series of George Floyd protests in Illinois. Demonstrations and protests were held in at least 30 communities around the state, with major demonstrations happening in Chicago. The vast majority of demonstrations were peaceful, though there were several instances of property damage or violence attributed to demonstrators or counter-protesters, the worst of which occurred in Aurora. In some cities, curfews were issued or orders released advising residents to avoid the areas in which protests were taking place.

== Locations ==
=== Aurora ===
On the night of May 31, rioters in Aurora looted shops and set a series of fires throughout the suburb's downtown area, already financially debilitated by the COVID-19 lockdown. Police responded by firing tear gas and shooting rubber bullets at the crowd, which reached about 500 people in size at its height. The demonstrators, in turn, hurled pieces of concrete and other items at officers. Besides plundering local businesses, the crowds set fire to three police vehicles, a bank drive-thru, and a Family Dollar location. A gas tank on one squad car exploded, and flames consumed the entire vehicle.

=== Barrington ===
On June 6, hundreds gathered in Citizens Park to protest police brutality and other issues in the black community.

=== Belleville ===
On June 3, around 175 people marched to the St. Clair County Building in support of Black Lives Matter and called for justice for George Floyd.

=== Bloomington ===
On May 29, a group of around 10 to 15 protesters gathered during the evening and demonstrated at the median of the intersection of Veterans Parkway and Clearwater Avenue. Protesters stated that the event initially consisted of a small group of people, but others eventually joined the demonstration. On May 31, another protest was held, this one with around 800 demonstrators. A man on a motorcycle hit several protesters.

=== Bradley ===
The Kankakee County sheriff department encouraged residents and motorists to avoid the Northfield Square Mall after reports of looting on May 31.

=== Carbondale ===
On May 31, more than a hundred gathered to demonstrate against racism and police brutality at Turley Park. On June 5, hundreds more participated in a peaceful march that began at the Carbondale civic center and concluded in front of the city's police station.

=== Calumet City ===
Following reports of looting and damaged buildings at River Oaks Mall the evening of May 31, a mandatory curfew was implemented.

=== Canton ===
On June 2, dozens of protesters gathered at Jones Park for the Stop the Hate protest. The event remained peaceful with no violence, looting, or arrests.

=== Cicero ===
On June 1, four people were shot, and two Cicero residents were shot and killed during rioting by "outside agitators." Over 60 people were arrested in the day-long rioting incident. The incident also brought out long-simmering racist attitudes, which has been criticized by local officials and sources.

=== Champaign–Urbana ===
Hundreds of protesters organized by Champaign–Urbana Black Lives Matter gathered at the Champaign County Courthouse in Urbana on June 1. Speakers and city officials were heard and then the crowd took to the streets. At one point, a road was unblocked so a vehicle could get to Carle Foundation Hospital. The protesters marched to the Urbana Police Department for more speeches, particularly concerning the April arrest in Urbana of Aleyah Lewis, and then continued towards downtown Champaign, ending at the Champaign Police Department. A second march through Champaign on June 6, primarily organized by high school students and recent graduates, drew thousands of protesters. Hundreds of protesters marched through Champaign in an "All Black Lives Matter" rally on June 28, the anniversary of the Stonewall riots, with a focus on injustices faced by LGBTQ black people.

=== Chicago ===
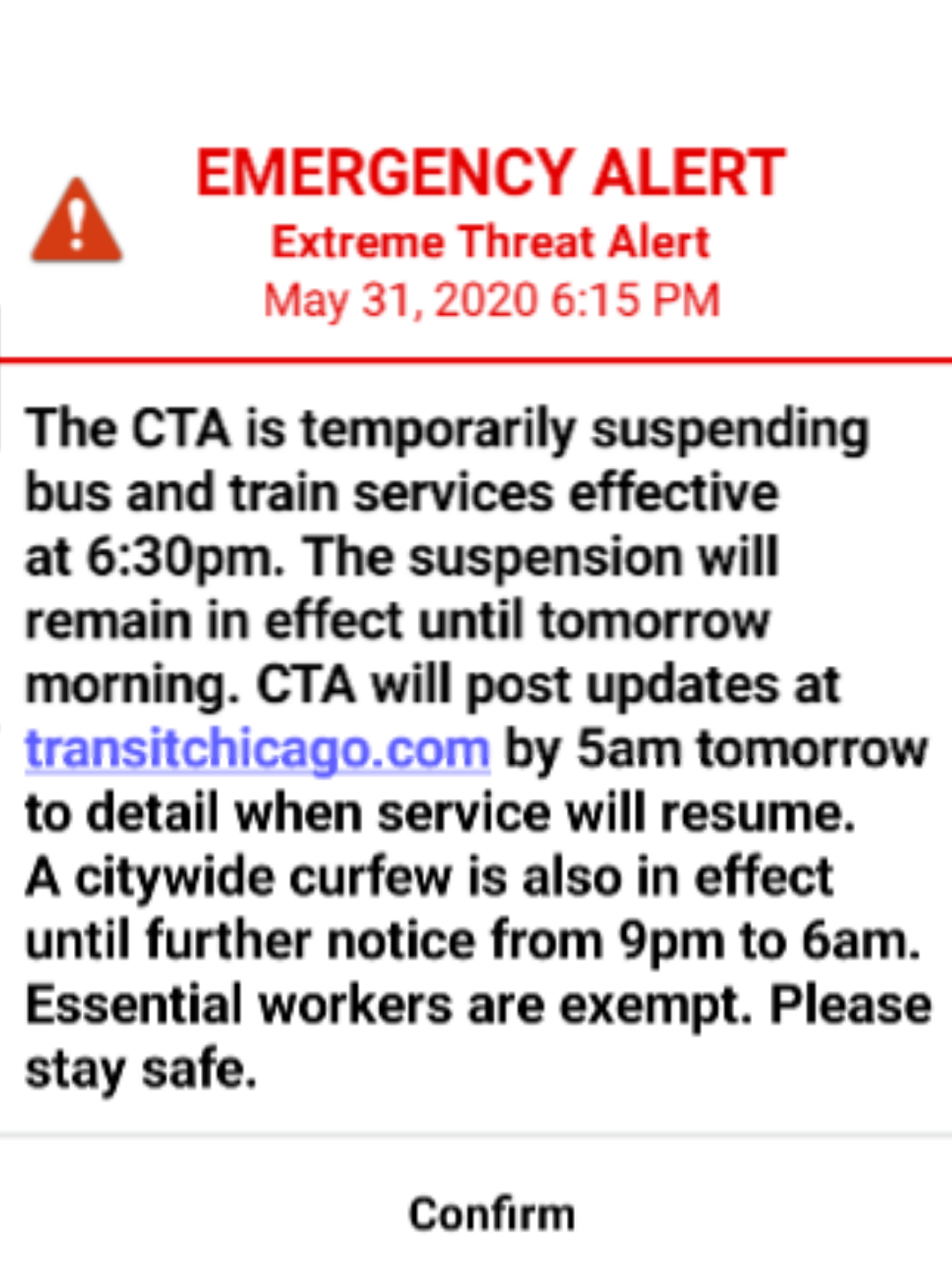
Warning sent to smartphones regarding a temporary suspension of CTA services on the night of May 31, 2020.

Numerous protests occurred over the course of five days in Chicago.

=== Decatur ===
A peaceful protest was held on May 30 outside the Decatur Civic Center. A few days later a peaceful protest march was held with hundreds of participants.

=== Deerfield ===
On June 3, a peaceful protest was held for over two hours in the evening at the corner of Deerfield and Waukegan roads. It was organized by a group of high school students.

=== Downers Grove ===
Authorities were responding to reports of looting at a Best Buy location on the 1400 block of Butterfield Road. Village officials encouraged residents to remain in their homes and for establishments to close immediately.

=== Elgin ===
On June 5, a crowd of protesters marched from Kiwanis Park to city hall to support Black Lives Matter. The event was peaceful, and an Elgin police officer performed a break dance for protesters.

=== Evanston ===
Over a thousand gathered for a protest on May 31.

=== Evergreen Park ===
On June 3, hundreds gathered for a peaceful protest at Klein (Circle) Park in the afternoon. The protest was organized by a group of local high school students.

=== Glenview ===
On June 4, there was a small protest near the intersection of East Lake and Shermer Road in the afternoon.

On June 10, there was another small protest on Glenview Road near the Metra station downtown.

=== Joliet ===
On May 29, a Black Lives Matter protest began at 2:00 p.m. at the intersection of Caton Farm Road and Route 59. The event was scheduled to end at 4:30 p.m., and around 100 protesters had gathered by 3:00 p.m.. The demonstration remained peaceful, and one group consisted of local high school students.

=== La Grange ===
On June 3, protesters gathered outside the La Grange Village Hall and marched to the Stone Avenue Metra Station.

=== LaSalle ===
On the afternoon of June 1, hundreds of peaceful protesters in LaSalle marched from the LaSalle Fire Station to City Hall and observed nine minutes of silence. Many local residents threatened to bring guns to the protest in case it turned violent, but no violence occurred.

=== Lincoln ===
A protest was held in Lincoln on June 4, with hundreds of demonstrators gathering at a park.

=== Macomb ===
A series of protests were held in early June, growing to over a hundred demonstrators at their peak.

=== Monticello ===
About 500 protesters gathered at the Piatt County Courthouse in Monticello on June 6 for speeches, then marched around the business district and concluded the protest back at the courthouse.

=== Mount Vernon ===
On May 30, an estimated 40-60+ marched against brutality on Broadway. No arrests were made.

=== Naperville ===
Hundreds of protesters gathered outside the Naperville Police Department on June 1. The Mayor and other officials "took a knee" with the protesters.

=== New Lenox ===
Residents received an alert on May 31 warning them to “stay close to home and remain vigilant,” as protesters were traveling during the afternoon near the stretch of the Lincoln Highway in the area.

=== Oregon ===
About 300 protesters gathered and marched peaceful around the Ogle County Courthouse Square on June 12, 2020. The protesters held a moment of silence for 8:46 in honor of Floyd at the end of the march. Money was also raised through donations and the sale of goods to fund various BLM causes.

=== Orland Park ===
On May 31, protests took place near Orland Square Mall as well as near 159th Street and LaGrange Road, according to the Orland Park Police Department.

=== Peoria ===
Thousands of protesters marched from the Gateway Building to the Peoria Police Department on May 30; the crowd was peaceful and people from a variety of races and ages, including children, attended. Protests also started at a Walmart in Peoria, then appeared at the Walmart in East Peoria. The East Peoria police chief said that the protests were mostly peaceful, but that the police responded with pepper balls in instances when projectiles were thrown at the police line, and the side of a nearby Lowe's hardware store was set on fire. No one was injured in those incidents.

Near Peoria's malls on May 31, businesses closed early and police blocked mall access. No protests or other crowds gathered near Northwoods Mall that night, but looting at other locations were reported. A local black man was later arrested on federal criminal charges for posting Facebook videos from various business areas, from 5 p.m. on May 31 to early on June 1, telling people to come to vandalize and loot, and complaining that locations were "peaceful as hell"; it appeared that he first targeted Northwoods Mall but changed locations after discovering a police presence.

On June 3, a peaceful vigil with a drum circle was held on the south side of Peoria and attended by about 200 people.

=== Rockford ===
On May 30, about 1,000 protesters gathered in Rockford to protest the murder of George Floyd. The protests soon turned violent when Rockford Police Department officers used minor damage to the District 1 building sign and broken windows to justify the beating of protesters. Rockford Police Department officers worked in coordination with Winnebago County sheriffs to shoot pepper spray bullets into crowds, and smash and pull individuals leaving the protests out of their cars, tased unarmed individuals, and beat people with riot shields and sticks. This event would eventually lead to the Rockford-based May 30 Alliance direct action organization.

=== Schaumburg ===
Peaceful protesters gathered at the town square at the corner of Schaumburg Road and Roselle Road on June 1.

=== Skokie ===
On June 4, around 2,000 people marched peacefully from Dempster and McCormick to Golf.

On June 14, people gathered in Oakton Park and downtown Skokie for a "Vigil for Black Lives". Businesses, houses of worship, and cultural organizations also participated.

=== Springfield ===
More than 1,000 protested peacefully on Ninth Street on June 1. The chief of Police said there were no problems with the protesters. Roads were blocked by the city to protect the demonstrators.

=== St. Charles ===
On June 6, around 1,000 people gathered in Lincoln Park for a peaceful Black Lives Matter rally.

=== Tinley Park ===
On June 2, around 150 people gathered in Downtown Tinley Park, just west of the Oak Park Avenue Metra train station, for a peaceful Black Lives Matter rally.

=== Waukegan ===
On the night of May 31, around 50 businesses were looted along Glen Flora Avenue. Five police squad cars were damaged, and 16 people were arrested. Peaceful protests would take place in the following weeks.
