= Louisville Water Company =

American water utility company

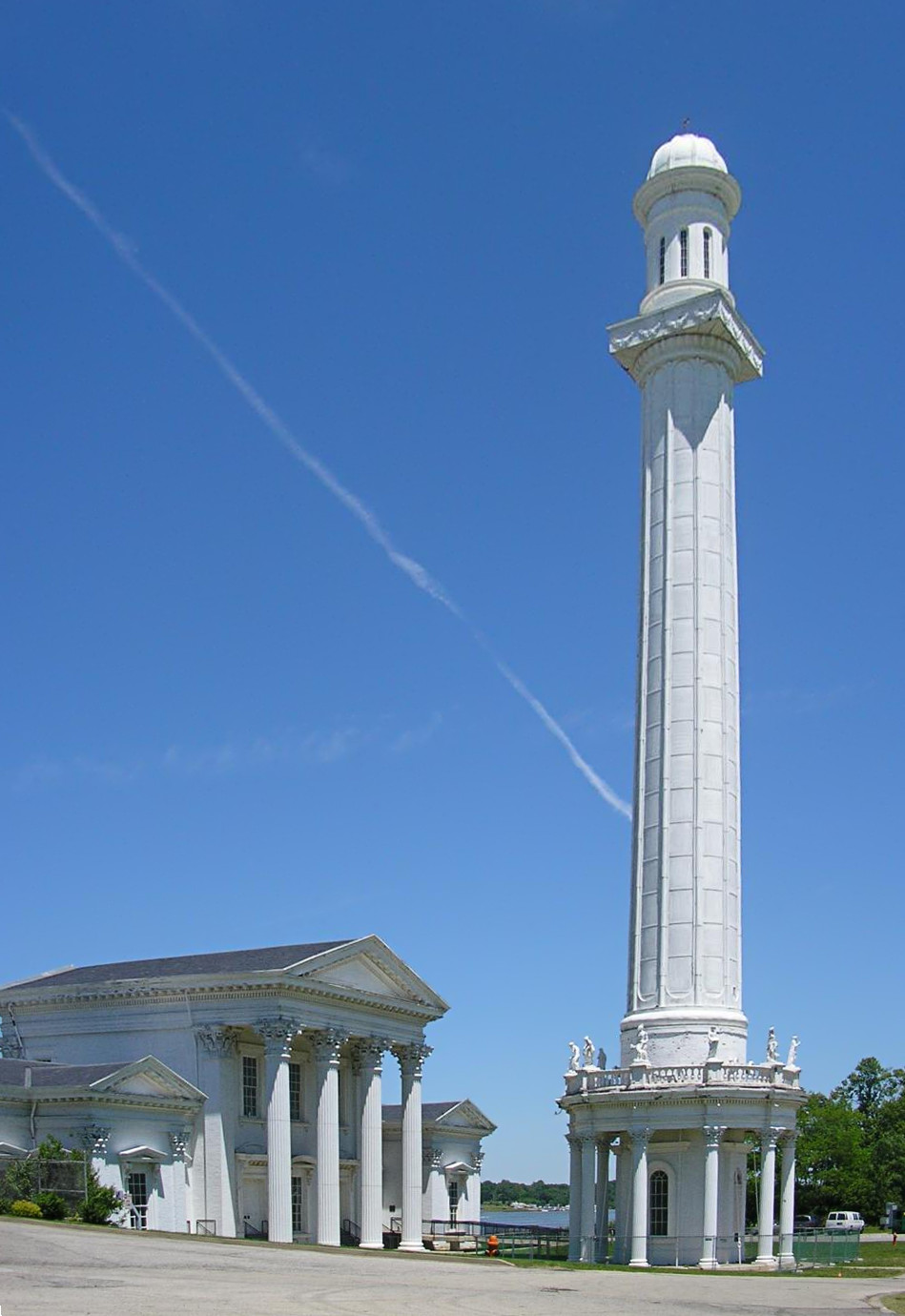
- Built between 1857-1860, the Louisville Water Tower is the oldest water tower in the United States.
- Formerly: Louisville Water Works
- Industry: Utilities; Water and wastewater
- Founded: March 6, 1854; 172 years ago
- Founder: Kentucky General Assembly
- Headquarters: 550 S 3rd Street, Louisville, Kentucky, United States
- Key people: Spencer Bruce, CEO; Greg Fischer, Chairman (ex-officio)
- Products: Water
- Owner: Louisville Metro Government (sole shareholder)

The Louisville Water Company is a water company based in Louisville, Kentucky.

== History ==
The Louisville Water Company has been in operation since 1860. First known as "The Water Works", the company served water to 512 customers. Water delivery began on 6 October 1860.

In 1879, the Crescent Hill Reservoir, developed by Charles Hermany and with a capacity of 100 million gallon, opened to retain more mud from the water cleaning process. Starting in 1896, sanitary engineer George W. Fuller launched experiments in filtration on the site.

The Water Company's Crescent Hill Treatment Plant, located in Crescent Hill, was opened on July 13, 1909, which enabled Louisvillians to get clean water. In 1914, the company started to use chlorine as a disinfectant. In 1917, a report from the US government sanitary service called the Louisville water "almost perfect".

In 1957, the company added anthracite to the sand and gravel water-filtering mixture.

The original Louisville Water Tower and pumping station have been preserved and are listed on the National Register of Historic Places since 1971.

In 1997, the company trademarked its drinking water as "Louisville pure tap".

In December 2010, the Environmental Working Group published a report on the quality of tap water in major US cities, and revealed that the Louisville tap water may contain significant levels of hexavalent chromium (chromium-6). The spokesperson of the company denied the allegations, stating their tap water was safe.

In 2014, the old Pumping Station No1 was restored and opened to the public as the new WaterWorks Museum.

In 2018, the company distributed 33.7 billion gallons of drinking water.

== Activities ==
The Louisville Water Company provides water to the more than 800,000 people in Louisville, Kentucky, as well as parts of Oldham and Bullitt counties.

The Louisville Water Company also provides wholesale water to the outlying counties of Shelby, Spencer, and Nelson counties.

Within the water-cleaning complex, 200 water quality tests are operated daily.

== See also ==
- Crescent Hill Reservoir
- Cardinal Hill Reservoir
