= Crescent Hill Reservoir =

- U.S. National Register of Historic Places
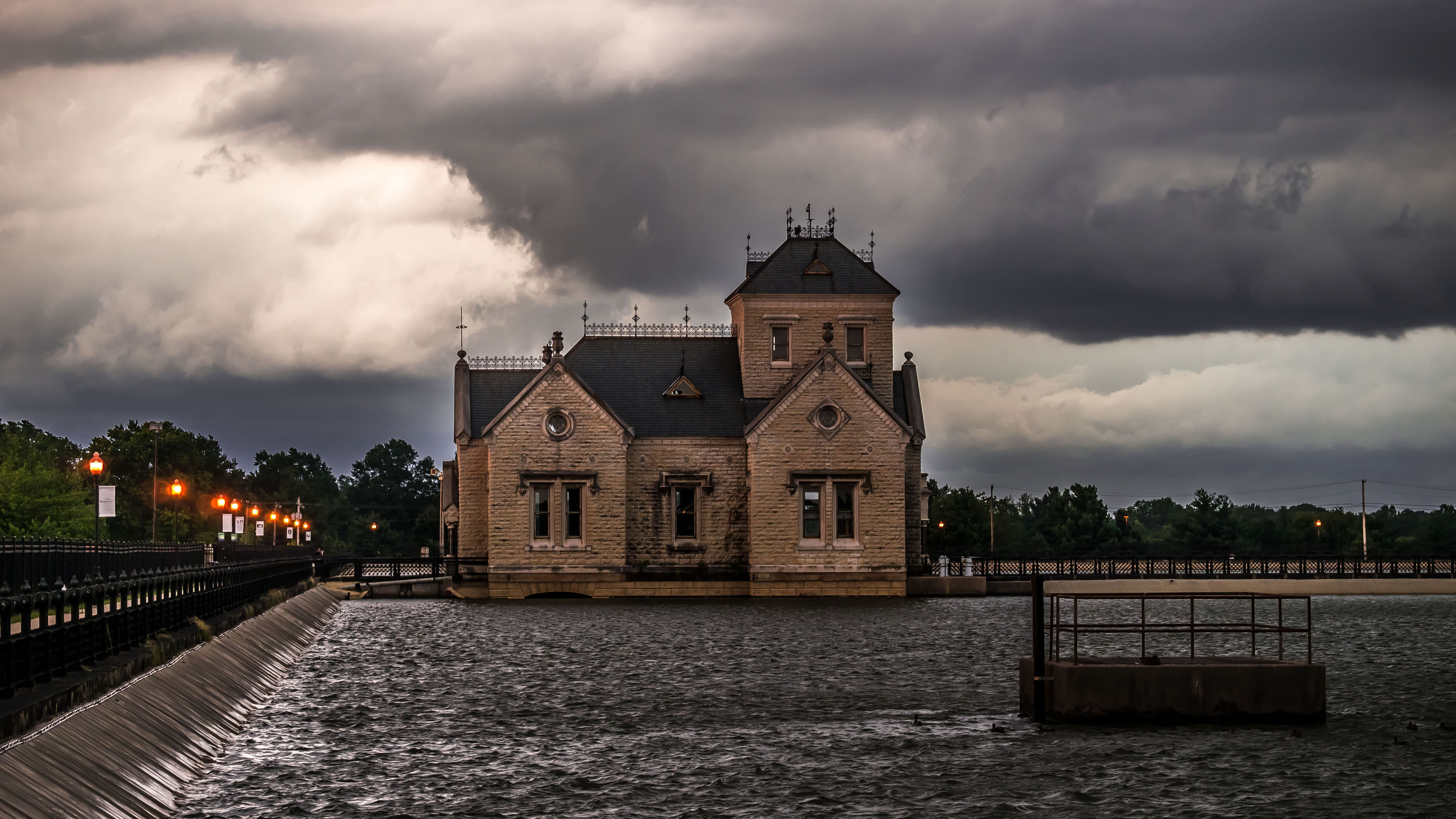
- Gatehouse at Crescent Hill Reservoir

- Location within Kentucky Location within the United States
- Location: Reservoir Ave., Louisville, Kentucky
- Coordinates: 38°15′24.9073″N 85°40′44.8086″W
- Area: 110 acres (45 ha)
- Built: 1879
- Architectural style: Gothic
- NRHP reference No.: 79001001
- Added to NRHP: September 10, 1979

Crescent Hill Reservoir is a historic site in Crescent Hill, Louisville, Kentucky. It is listed on the National Register of Historic Places. Historic tours and walks have been hosted at the site and it is a popular area for walkers and runners. It is located at the intersection of Reservoir Avenue and 3018 Frankfort Avenue.

The Gothic architecture-style gatehouse building was constructed in 1879. It was designed by water company chief engineer Charles Hermany. The Crescent Hill Filtration Plant opened in 1909 "culminating landmark experiments" in sand and gravel filtration. The site includes historical markers.

== See also ==
- Louisville Water Tower
- Cardinal Hill Reservoir
- List of attractions and events in the Louisville metropolitan area
- National Register of Historic Places listings in Jefferson County, Kentucky
