= Cardinal Hill Reservoir =

- U.S. National Register of Historic Places
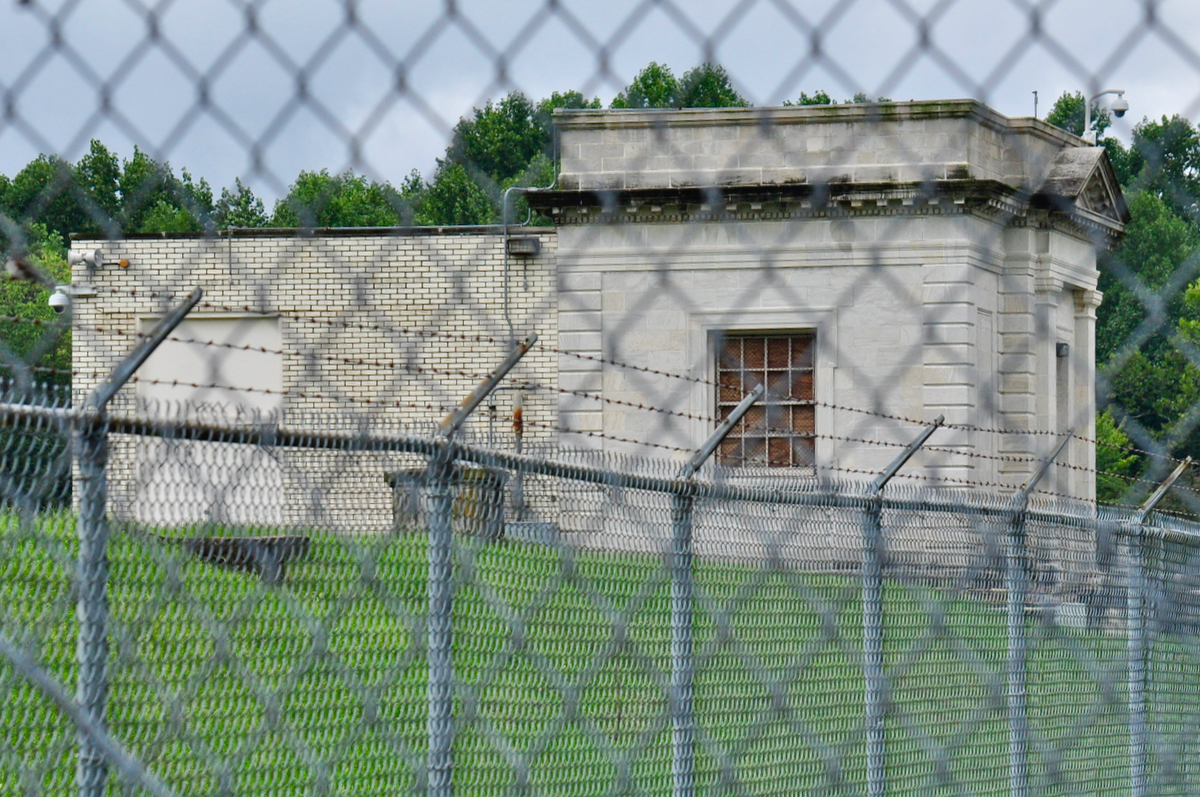

- Location within Kentucky Location within the United States
- Location: Cardinal Hill Rd., Louisville, Kentucky
- Coordinates: 38°8′47.2488″N 85°48′14.8655″W
- Area: 0 acres (0 ha)
- Built: 1931
- Architectural style: Classical Revival
- MPS: Jefferson County MRA
- NRHP reference No.: 80001597
- Added to NRHP: December 5, 1980

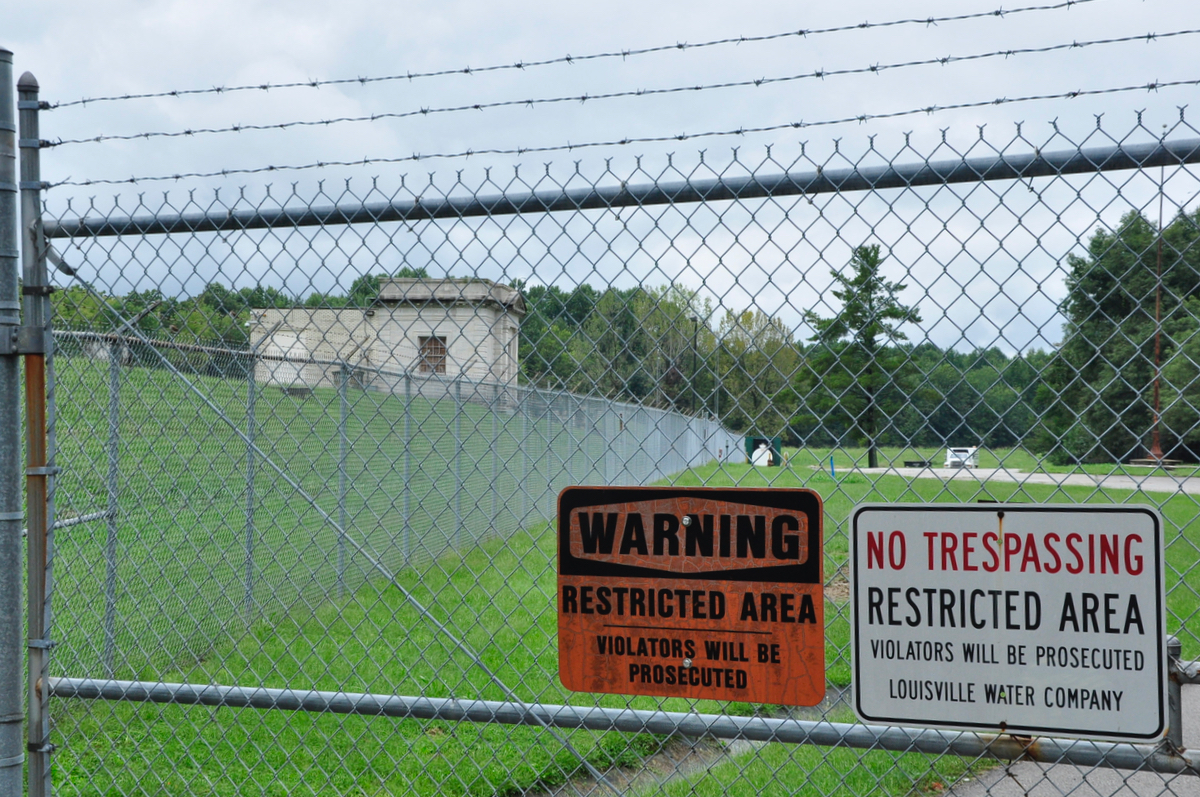
a partial view of the restriction fence & closed gate of the Cardinal Hill Reservoir

Cardinal Hill Reservoir is a historic site in Jefferson County, Kentucky. It is listed on the National Register of Historic Places. It was designed by Chicago architect Victor Andre Matteson. A one-story structure of stone (ashlar), it includes Doric pilasters, full entablature, parapet wall, shouldered architraves, quoins, and balustraded stairs. Lights along front bank of old reservoir set on pedestal bases "with tomb-like structures" holding lights at corners.

== See also ==
- Crescent Hill Reservoir
- Louisville Water Tower
- National Register of Historic Places listings in Jefferson County, Kentucky
