= LaSalle City Building =

- U.S. National Register of Historic Places
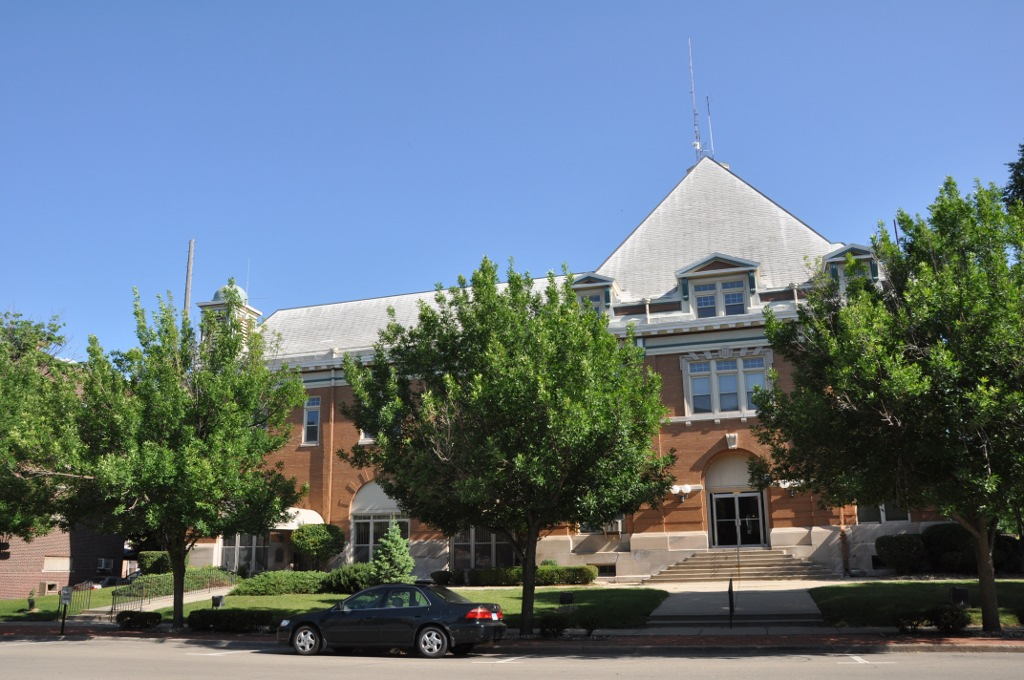

- Location within Illinois Location within the United States
- Location: 745 2nd St., LaSalle, Illinois
- Coordinates: 41°19′46″N 89°5′41″W
- Area: 0.6 acres (0.24 ha)
- Built: 1907
- Architect: Victor Andre Matteson
- Architectural style: Colonial Revival, French Revival
- NRHP reference No.: 85001909
- Added to NRHP: August 29, 1985

The LaSalle City Building is the historic civic hall building in LaSalle, Illinois, United States. Completed in 1907, the hall exemplifies early 20th-century trends in city management.

== History ==
The idea of a new city building for LaSalle, Illinois came from Walter A. Panneck, who served as mayor from 1903 to 1909. However, the city treasury did not have the funds to match Panneck's vision. To raise enough money for the structure, 450 bonds of $100 were issued, 422 of which were sold. The building was designed by Victor Andre Matteson, a relatively obscure architect who previously worked under Frost & Granger. All city departments were consolidated into this one building, a popular trend during the Progressivism movement. The building was recognized by the National Park Service with a listing on the National Register of Historic Places on August 29, 1985.

== Architecture ==
The symmetrical two and a half story building is largely rectangular. It was built with red brick with Bedford limestone trim. Balustrades and modillions are detailed with galvanized iron and tin. The main entrance is a double door on the south, facing Second Street, while a second public entrance faces Joliet Street on the east. There is also a private entrance, used by the police department, facing an alley to the north. Fanlight windows are found over each entrance, though the exterior of each has been covered with a panel.

The first floor has a central hall plan and is home to the police department. A jail was originally part of the police wing, but has since been converted to office use. Although the police wing has been extensively modified from its original design, the public hall closely resembles the original plan. The city engineer's office is on the second floor and council chambers are on the third. A basement, originally small and intended only for a furnace, has been greatly expanded.
