= Charles Hermany =

American architect (1830–1908)

- Born: October 9, 1830; Lynn Township, Pennsylvania, U.S.
- Died: January 18, 1908 (aged 77); Cincinnati, Ohio, U.S.
- Resting place: Cave Hill Cemetery; Louisville, Kentucky, U.S.
- Occupations: Engineer; architect
- Spouse: Sallie Adams (m. 1854)
- Children: 7

Charles Hermany (October 9, 1830 – January 18, 1908) was an engineer and architect.

== Early life ==
Charles Hermany was born on October 9, 1830, in Lynn Township, Pennsylvania to Salome (née Wannemacher) and Samuel Hermany. He attended local schools and two terms at Minerva Seminary in Easton, Pennsylvania. He attended college and then worked on his father's farm for three years. He studied mathematics and engineering while practicing land surveying in the field.

== Career ==
In 1853, Hermany moved to Cleveland, Ohio and accepted a position at the City Engineer's office. In 1857, he joined the Louisville Water Company in Louisville, Kentucky as first assistant to the chief engineer. He assisted Theodore Scowden in designing the Louisville Water Works buildings. He designed the Crescent Hill Water Plant. Hermany became the chief engineer and superintendent of the Louisville Water Company on January 1, 1861. He worked in that role for more than 25 years and designed water systems for Bowling Green, Kentucky and Frankfort, Kentucky. His map of a park system for the Salmagundi Club is said to have inspired Frederick Law Olmsted's work.

Hermany was also involved in the design of the River Pumping Station for the Cincinnati Water Works.

In 2009 the Louisville Water Company (LWC) celebrated the 100th anniversary of the Crescent Hill Filtration Plant. Their website notes, "the opening in 1909 culminated Chief Engineer Charles Hermany's quest for pure water. It marked 30 years of research that included building the Crescent Hill Reservoir and a landmark experiment to develop a purification process for drinking water." Hermany worked with George Warren Fuller to complete the project.

The designs have even been said to have influenced Frederick Law Olmsted who visited in 1891. A University of Kentucky student compared Hermany's work with that of Marcus Agrippa's in Imperial Rome.

Hermany was elected as a member of the American Society of Civil Engineers on January 6, 1869. He was elected in November 1879 to the member of the board. He was elected vice president in 1891 and as president in 1904. He was the first president of the Engineers' and Architects' Club of Louisville and served for six terms.

== Personal life ==
Charles Hermany's brother was the Pennsylvania German poet Edward Hermany. Charles married Sallie Adams on December 19, 1854. They had seven children, including Irene H., Emily H., Madeline and Hettie May.

Hermany died on January 18, 1908, in Cincinnati. He was buried in Cave Hill Cemetery in Louisville.
