= Louisville WaterWorks Museum =

Coordinates: 38°16′50.9″N 85°42′04.7″W

Louisville WaterWorks Museum opened in the west wing of a renovated and restored interior of Pumping Station No. 1 on Zorn Avenue at 3005 River Road in Louisville, Kentucky overlooking the Ohio River. The building was constructed from 1858 until 1860 as part of Louisville's original water works. It was listed as a National Historic Landmark in 1971.

Renovations began in January 2013 and the museum opened on March 1, 2014.

The restoration restored the building to pre-Civil War condition along with a 1900s-era cast-iron spiral staircase. New bathrooms and prep kitchen were added.

The museum collections include Louisville Water's historic photographs, films and memorabilia, as well as architectural drawings, water main sections, meters and tools, and a steam mud pump. The exhibit topics include riverbank filtration, clean drinking water, the use of mules in reservoir cleaning, steam engines, architecture and engineering innovations.

The museum is located on the same site as the Louisville Water Tower in the area known as Louisville Water Tower Park.

== See also ==
- List of attractions and events in the Louisville metropolitan area
- List of museums in the Louisville metropolitan area
