= Crescent Hill, Louisville =

- Crescent Hill Historic District
- U.S. National Register of Historic Places
- U.S. Historic district
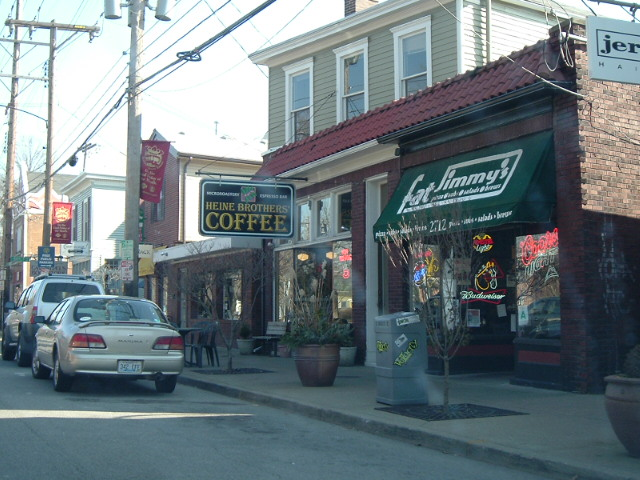
- Frankfort Avenue in Crescent Hill

- Location within Kentucky Location within the United States
- Location: Roughly bounded by Brownsboro and Lexington Rds, Peterson, Zorn, and Frankfort Aves., and Crabbs Lane, Louisville, Kentucky
- Coordinates: 38°15′11″N 85°41′12″W
- Area: 590.6 acres (2.390 km^{2})
- Architectural style: Colonial Revival, Classical Revival
- NRHP reference No.: 82001556
- Added to NRHP: November 12, 1982

Crescent Hill is a neighborhood four miles (6 km) east of downtown Louisville, Kentucky USA. This area was originally called "Beargrass" because it sits on a ridge between two forks of Beargrass Creek. The boundaries of Crescent Hill are N Ewing Ave to the St. Matthews city limit (roughly Cannons Lane) by Brownsboro Road to Lexington Road. Frankfort Avenue generally bisects the neighborhood.

The Crescent Hill Historic District, roughly bounded by Brownsboro and Lexington Rds., Peterson, Zorn, and Frankfort Aves., and Crabbs Lane, was listed on the National Register of Historic Places in 1982.

== History ==
Development first began during the 1850s when the Louisville and Lexington turnpike (now Frankfort Avenue) and the Louisville and Frankfort railroad were built through the area. In 1853 a 38-acre (150,000 m^{2}) fair grounds were built and were used to host the Agriculture and Technology fair, which had 20,000 visitors on one day in 1857. In 1883 the fair grounds were razed and St Joseph's Orphanage was built in its place.

In the late 19th century The City of Louisville annexed the old town of Crescent Hill. The Crescent Hill Community Council was incorporated in the early 1970s and became very active after the tornado of April 1974. In the early 1980s the CHCC formed the Peterson-Dumesnil House Foundation and purchased the house -at 301 South Peterson - from the Jefferson County Board of Education.

Registered historic sites in Crescent Hill include the Louisville Water Company Crescent Hill Reservoir and the Peterson-Dumesnil House.

== Demographics ==
As of 2000, the population of Crescent Hill was 7,566, of which 91.4% are white, 4.2% are listed as other, 3.1% are black, and 1.3% are Hispanic. College graduates are 52.3% of the population, people without a high school degree are 8%. Females outnumber males 54.9% to 45.12%.

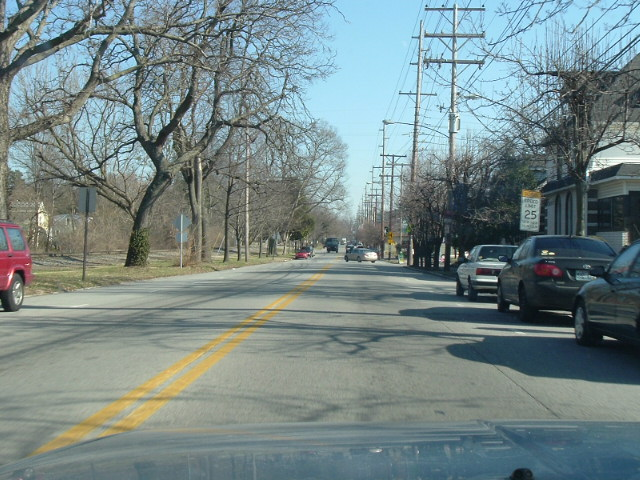
Frankfort Avenue

== Education ==
Crescent Hill has a lending library, a branch of the Louisville Free Public Library.

Southern Baptist Theological Seminary, a private institution, is located at Crescent Hill.

== See also ==
- List of attractions and events in the Louisville metropolitan area
