= Fourteenth Street Bridge (Ohio River) =

Railroad bridge between Kentucky and Indiana

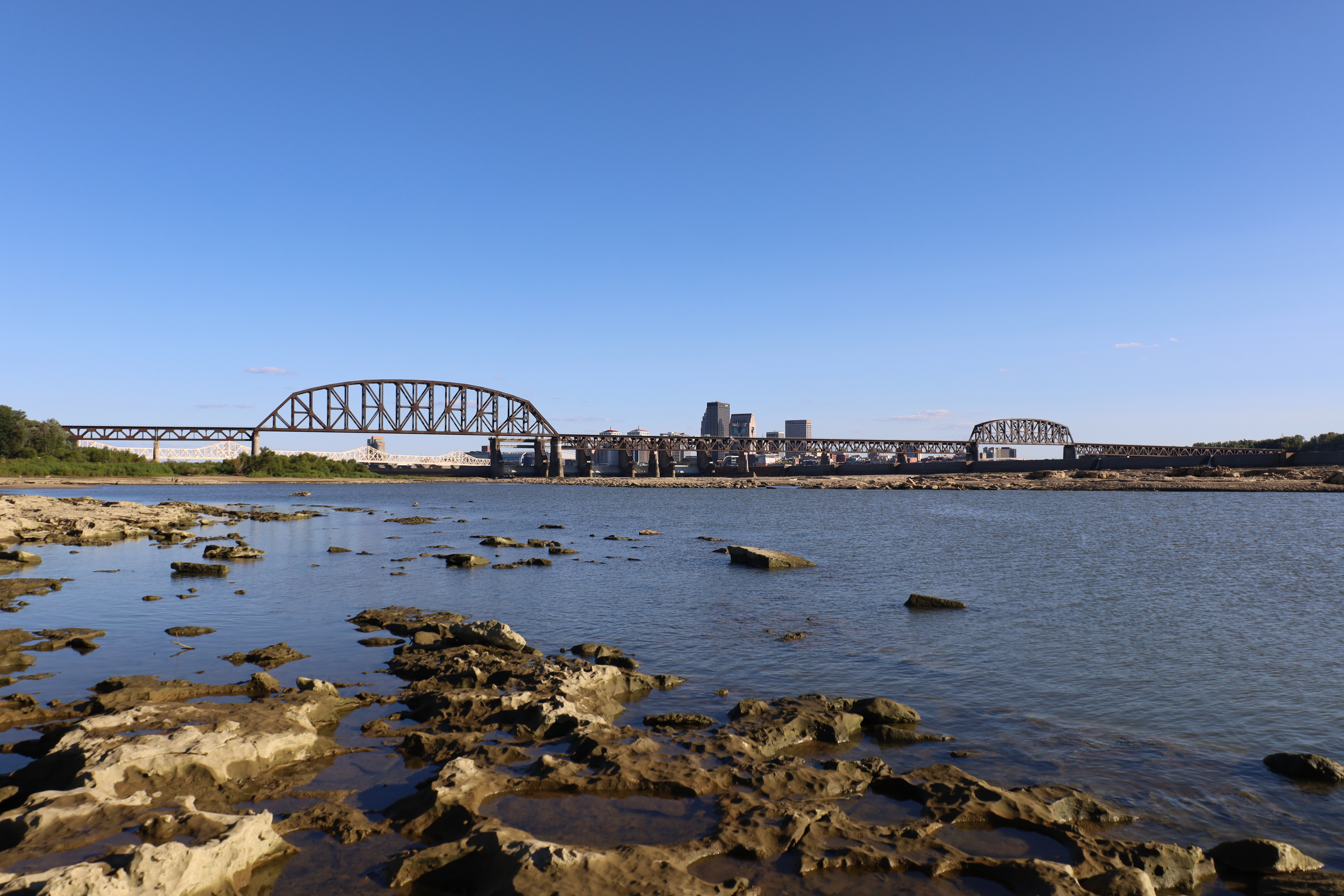
- The bridge viewed from Falls of the Ohio State Park in 2025. The two major fixed spans are visible, but the drawspan over the Louisville and Portland Canal is hidden behind trees at far right.
- Coordinates: 38°16′10″N 85°45′52″W
- Carries: Louisville and Indiana Railroad and CSX Transportation
- Crosses: Ohio River
- Locale: Louisville, Kentucky and Clarksville, Indiana
- Other name: Ohio Falls Bridge
- Maintained by: Louisville and Indiana Railroad

Characteristics
- Design: Truss vertical-lift bridge
- Total length: 3,289 ft (1,000 m)
- Longest span: 645 ft (197 m)

History
- Opened: 1870

Location
- Interactive map of Fourteenth Street Bridge

The Fourteenth Street Bridge, also known as the Ohio Falls Bridge, Pennsylvania Railroad Bridge, Conrail Railroad Bridge or Louisville and Indiana (L&I) Bridge, is a truss drawbridge that spans the Ohio River, between Louisville, Kentucky and Clarksville, Indiana.

Built by the Louisville Bridge Company and completed in 1870, the bridge was operated for many years by the Pennsylvania Railroad, giving the company its only access to Kentucky. Ownership of the railroad and the bridge passed on to Penn Central and later Conrail, which then sold the line from Louisville to Indianapolis, Indiana to the Louisville and Indiana Railroad, the current bridge owner.

The draw portion of the bridge is a vertical-lift span, built in about 1918 in place of a swing span. The towers and machinery of the lift span were designed by Waddell and Son, Inc., and there is a plaque on the SW tower reading, "Waddell Vertical Lift Bridge, Waddell and Son, 1917". The draw span is across the upstream end of the Louisville and Portland Canal, which includes the McAlpine Locks and Dam. Ohio River traffic passes through this canal to navigate past the Falls of the Ohio.

== History ==
=== Original bridge ===
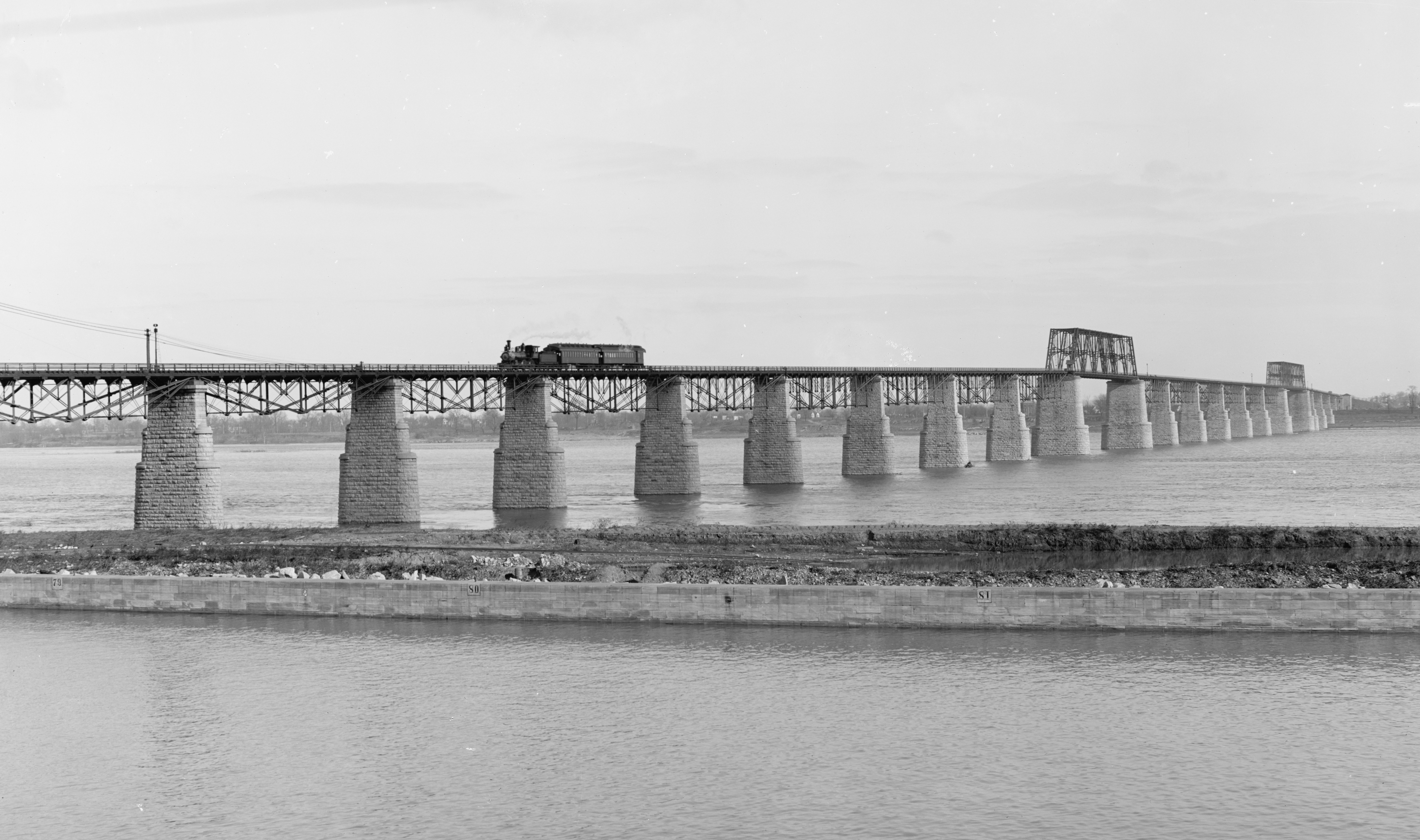
The bridge in its original configuration in 1906

There were attempts to build a bridge to link Louisville to the Indiana shore as early as the 1830s. James Guthrie, as the head of the Ohio Bridge Company, attempted to build such a bridge in 1829. An architect from New England, Ithiel Town, was to build a wooden structure. A cornerstone was laid for the bridge in 1836 by Twelfth Street in Louisville, but the Panic of 1837 stopped further construction. This failure, plus the unsuccessful attempt to woo the capital of Kentucky to Louisville, would become known as "Guthrie's Folly". An additional attempt was made in the 1850s, but that too would be stymied due to financing difficulties.

By the 1860s, the Louisville and Nashville Railroad and the Jeffersonville and Indianapolis Railroad both desired a railroad bridge across the river. The United States Congress approved the building of such a bridge on February 17, 1865, stating that it must not interfere with river traffic. As there were no bridges across the Ohio River at Cincinnati or any place west, including Louisville, crossing the river during the winter months during the war years stressed the need for such a bridge. The L&N financed the Louisville Bridge Company to begin building such a bridge, with the work beginning on August 1, 1867. Albert Fink was the architect, who used his Fink truss design for the project. Stone for the bridge's piers came from Bardstown Junction, Kentucky and Utica, Indiana. At the time it was built, it was the longest iron bridge in the United States, with its 27 spans covering a total mile. It was to have a minimum span length of 330 feet (100 m), but the spans were of 352 and 380 feet (107 and 116 m). It was built high enough to allow steamboats to pass underneath on their way through the Falls of the Ohio along the Portland Canal; in fact, the bridge was built higher than was required, raising the cost of the bridge by $150,000.

On February 18, 1870, the first train crossed the bridge. Railroad bridges seldom attained formal names, so it quickly was called the "Fourteenth Street Bridge" by locals. Soon, commuters trains would take passengers from Jeffersonville and New Albany to Louisville. The Pennsylvania Railroad purchased the L&N's 60% ownership of the bridge, and with it, control of the bridge in the mid-1870s, after acquiring the tracks between Jeffersonville and Indianapolis. While controlled by the Pennsylvania Railroad, it was called the Pennsylvania Bridge. By 1882 the bridge would be used by trains 150 times a day, with communications between each side of the bridge being done by semaphore. By the 1900s, the bridge was being used 300 times a day, which was putting more stress on the bridge than it could handle.

=== Current bridge ===
A video of the lift span descending in 2025

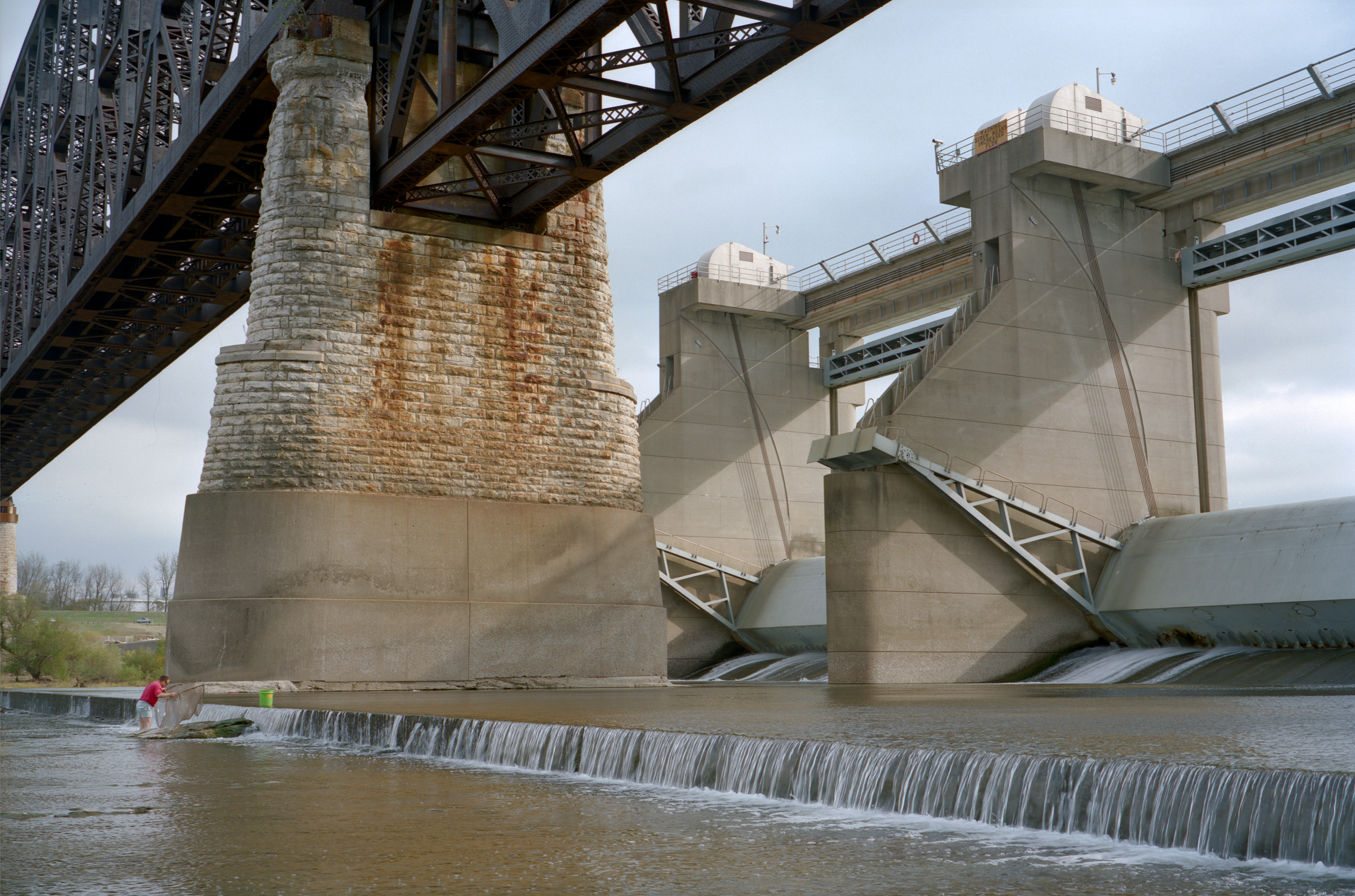
Fourteenth Street Bridge pier and upper gates of McAlpine Dam in 1998

Between May 1916 and January 1919 a new double-track steel superstructure was placed on the old stone piers. One pier in the middle of the Indiana chute was removed, making one span as long as 645 feet (197 m) long, improving river navigation. A lift span replaced a swing span that was above the canal.

In 1968 a merger between the Pennsylvania Railroad and the New York Central Railroad caused the bridge to be controlled by the new Pennsylvania and New York Central Transportation Company, usually called Penn Central. In 1976 it became under the auspices of the Consolidated Railroad Corporation, known as Conrail. The Louisville and Indiana Railroad attained control of it by purchasing it from Conrail in March 1994, after it acquired Conrail's rail line between Louisville and Indianapolis.

The Fourteenth Street Bridge is still used today, although not as much as during its height. Railroads that use the bridge include the owner, the Louisville and Indiana Railroad, and CSX Transportation. The bridge marks the eastern boundary of Falls of the Ohio State Park.

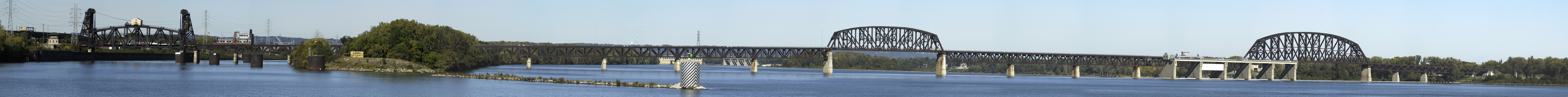
Panorama of the Fourteenth Street Bridge in 2005

== See also ==
- List of crossings of the Ohio River

== Gallery ==
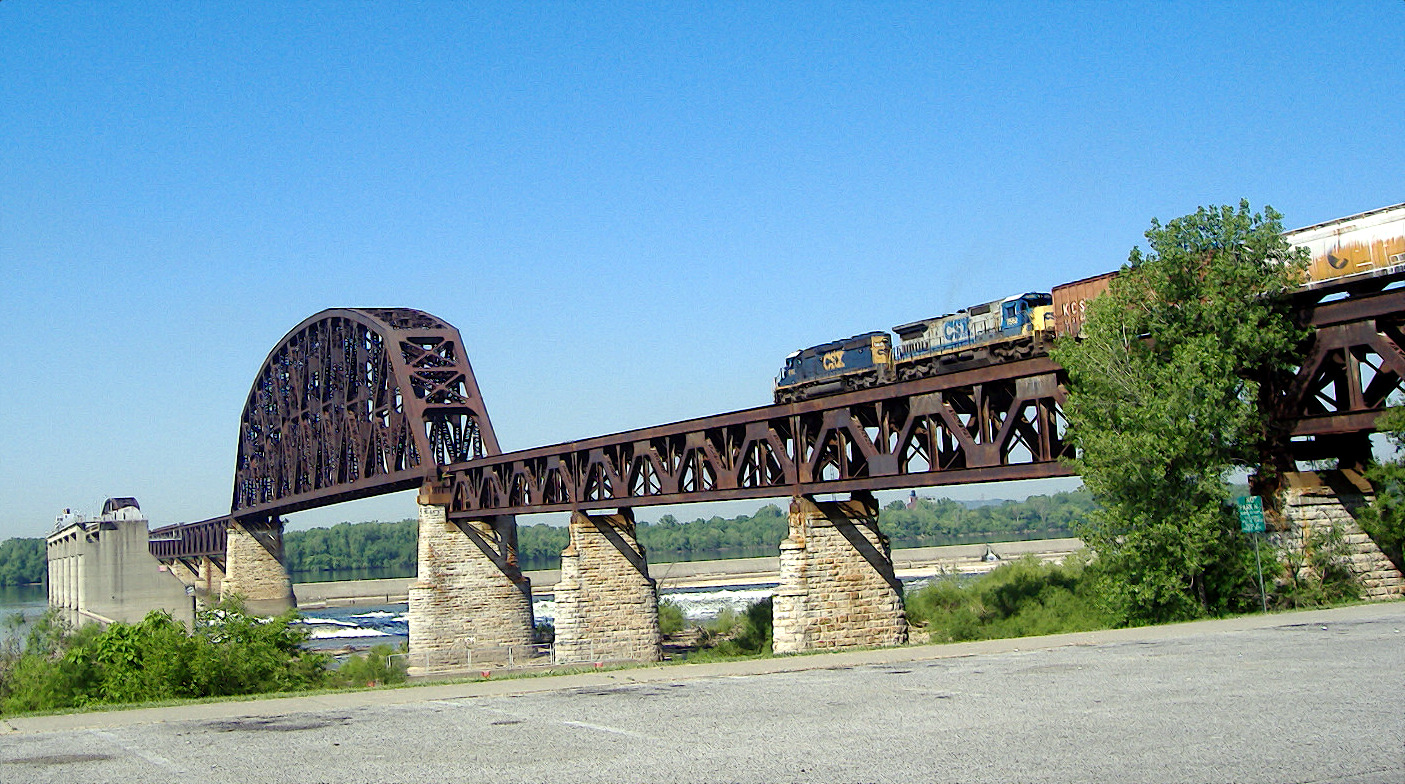
The bridge viewed from the Clarksville waterfront in 2007

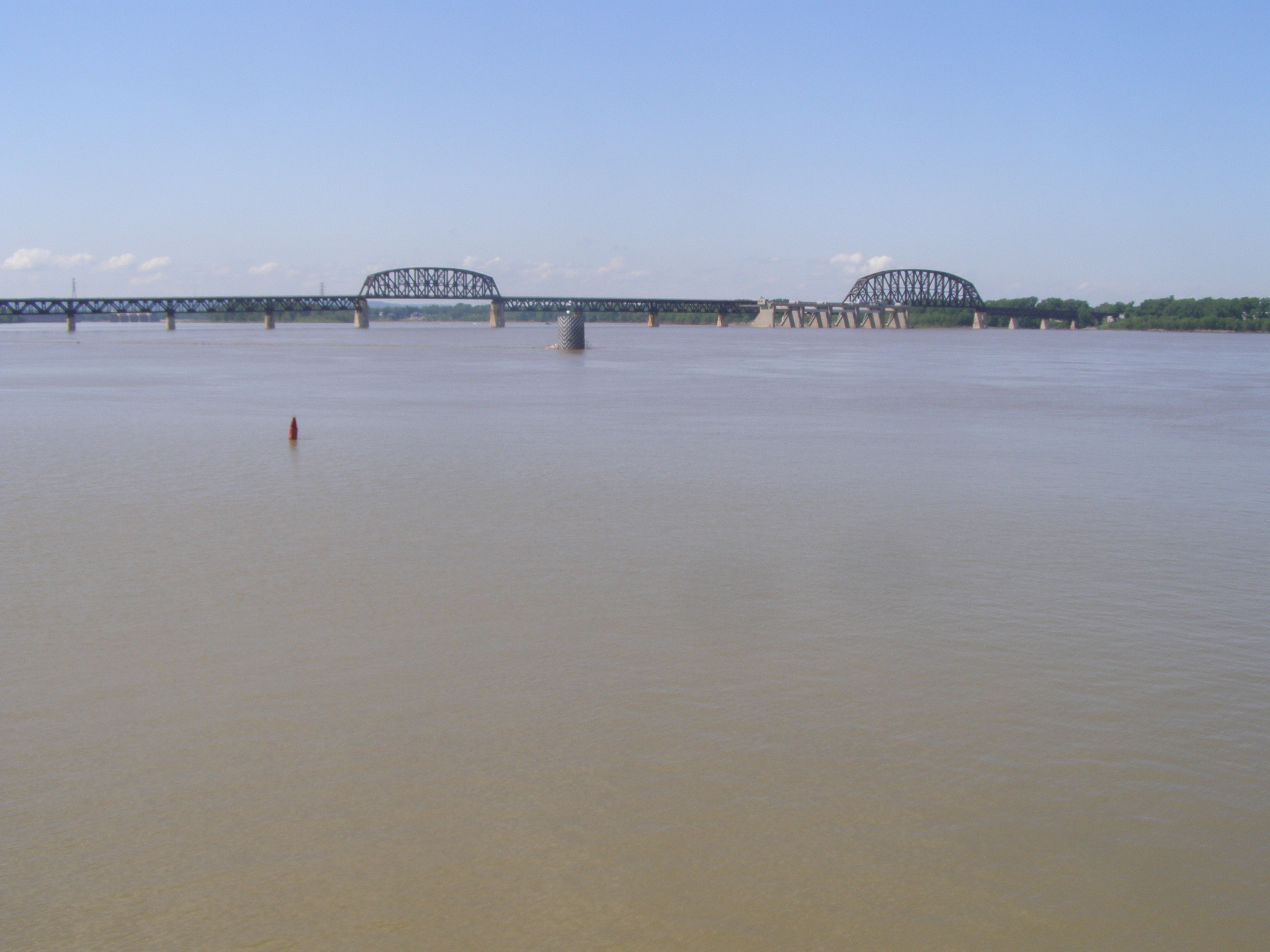
Wide view of the bridge in 2011

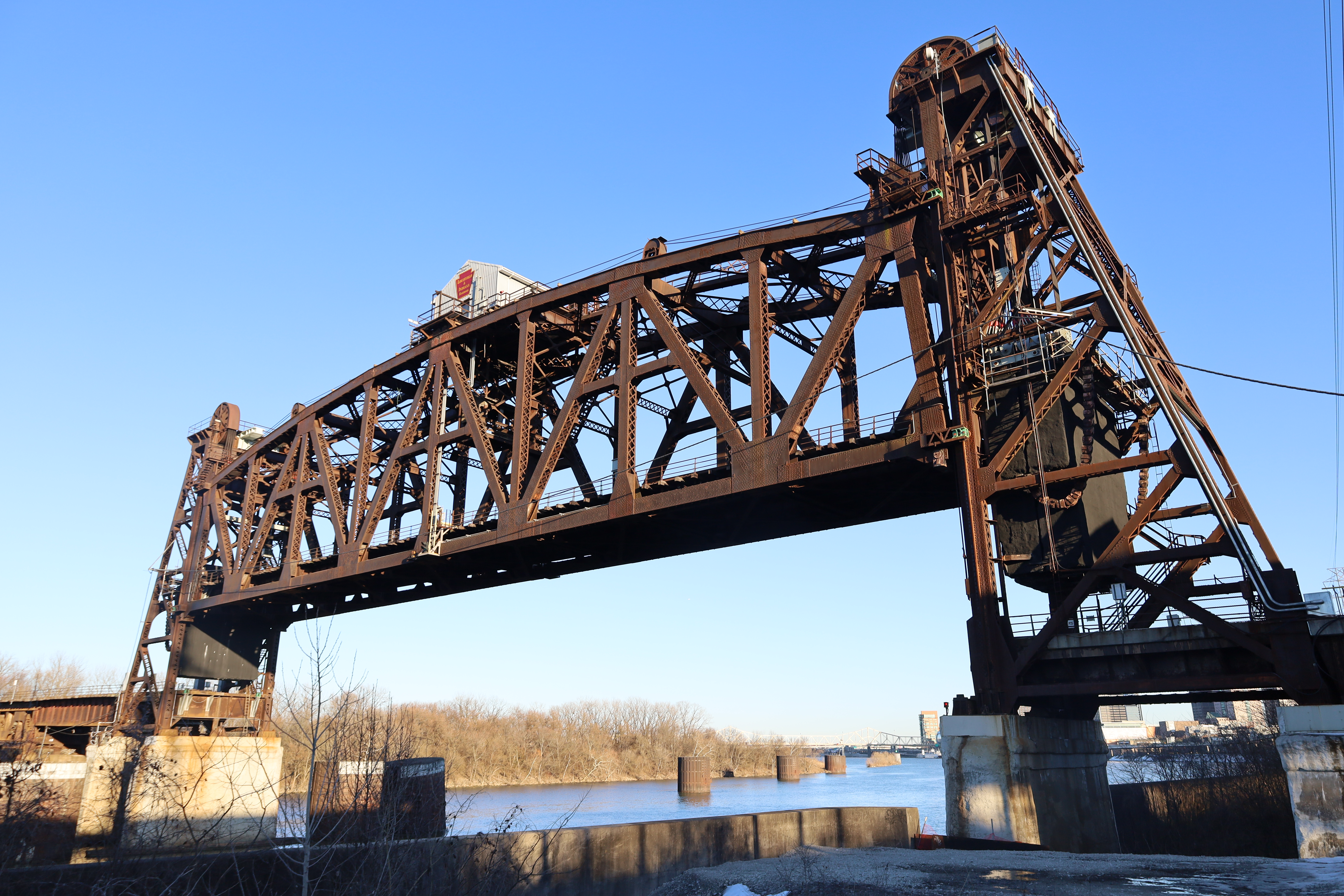
The lift span in 2025

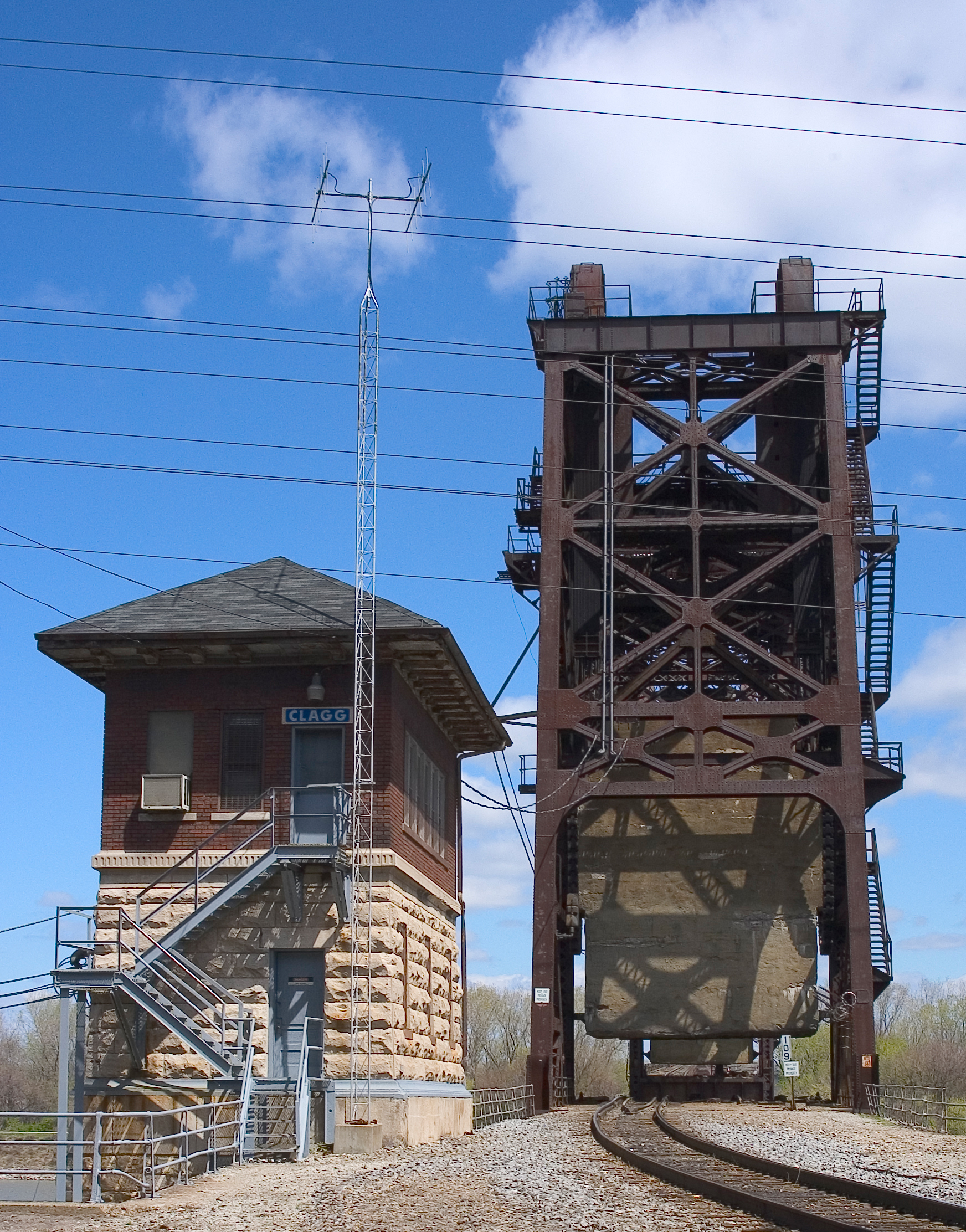
View of vertical lift bridge in raised position and of the control tower

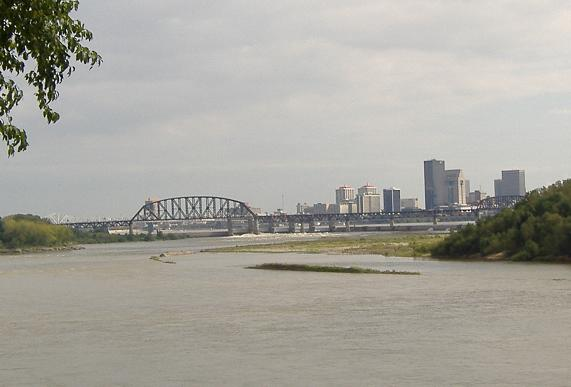
View from the George Rogers Clark Homesite.

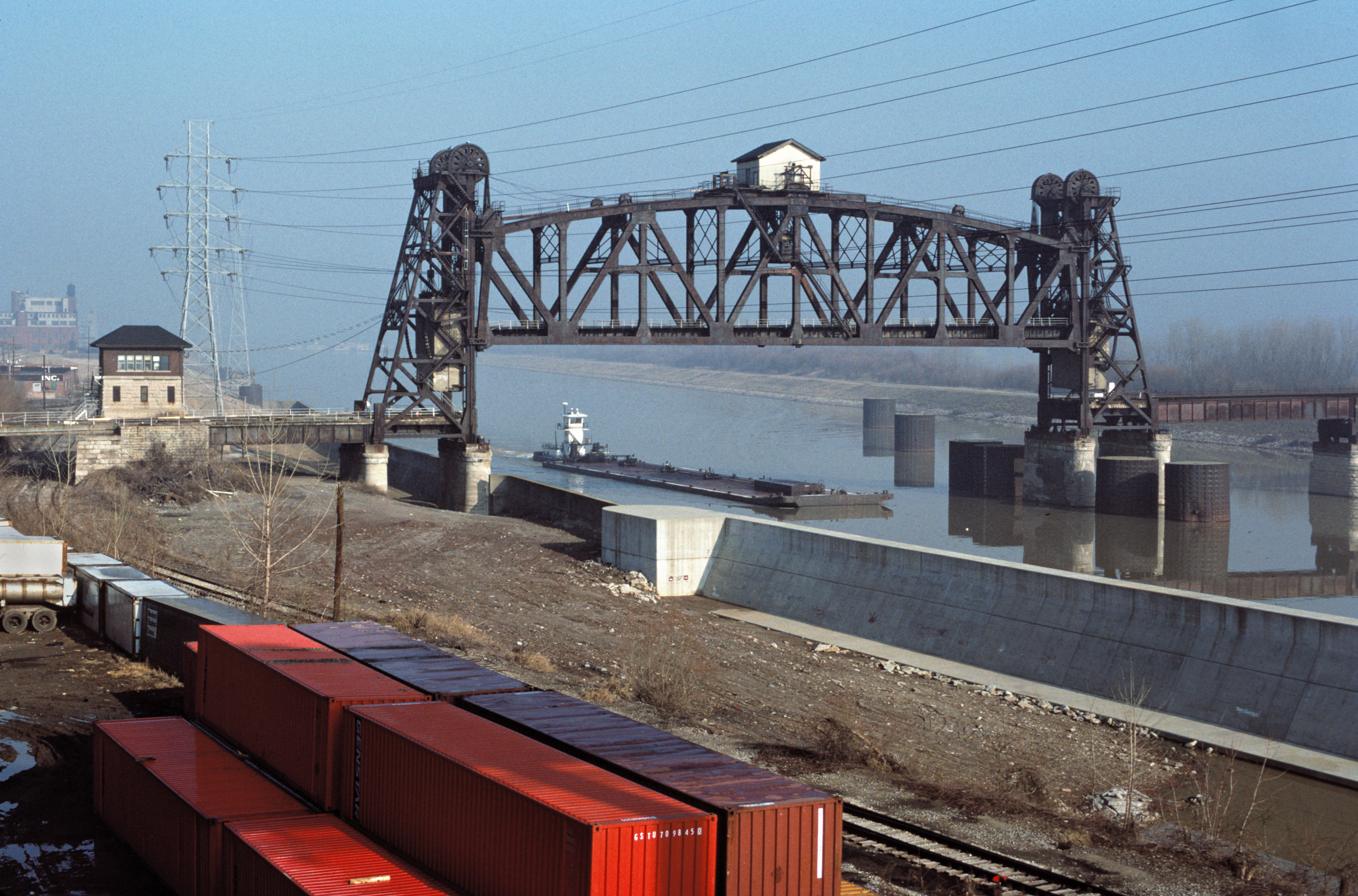
Lift span in raised position with towboat "Jim D" passing underneath

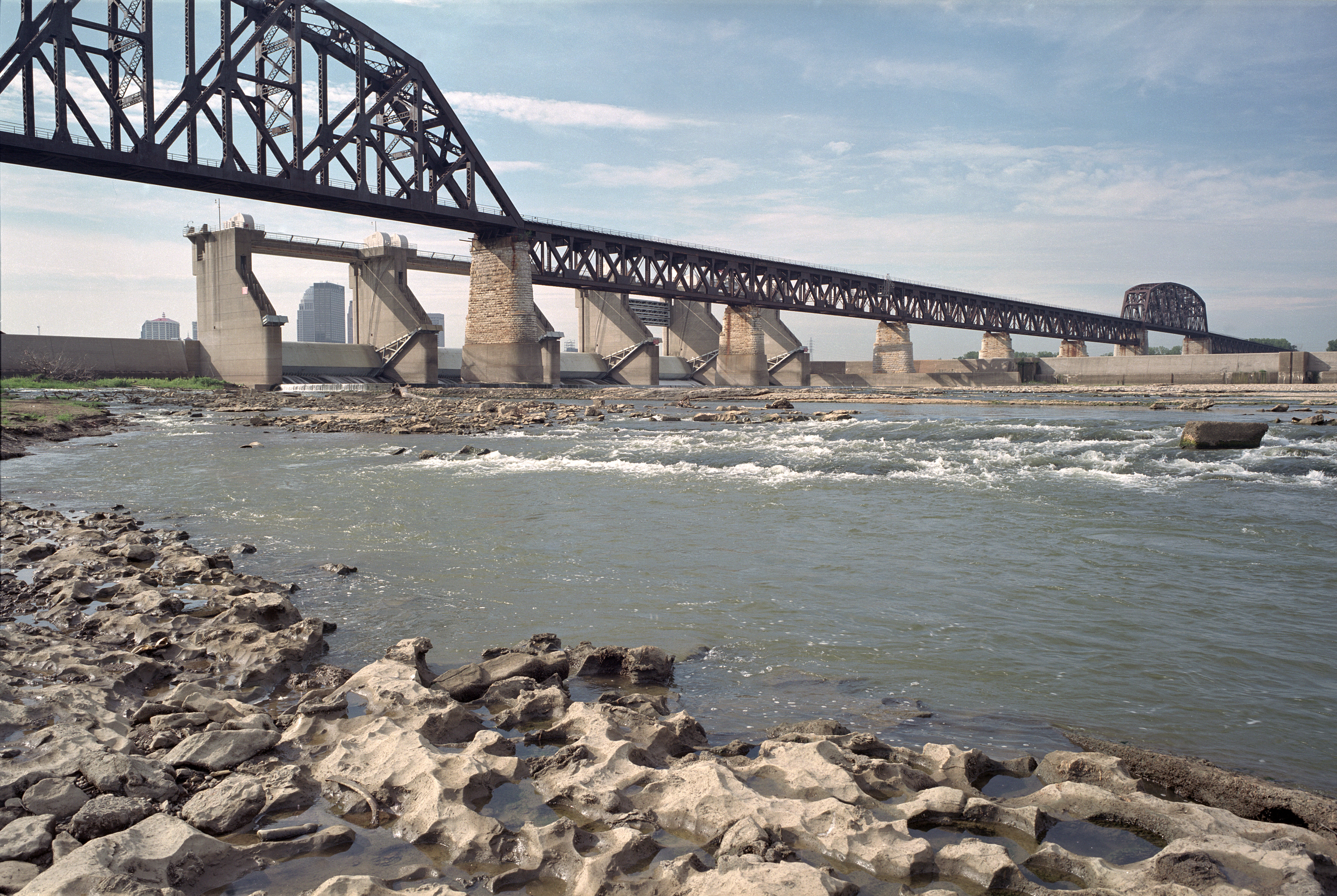
Looking S from Falls of the Ohio with Fourteenth Street (L&I) Bridge and McAlpine Dam

== Further reading and external links ==
- Fourteenth Street Bridge at Bridges & Tunnels
- Pennsylvania Railroad Bridge at Structurae
