= Indiana Canal Company =

Canal building corporation in Indiana, USA

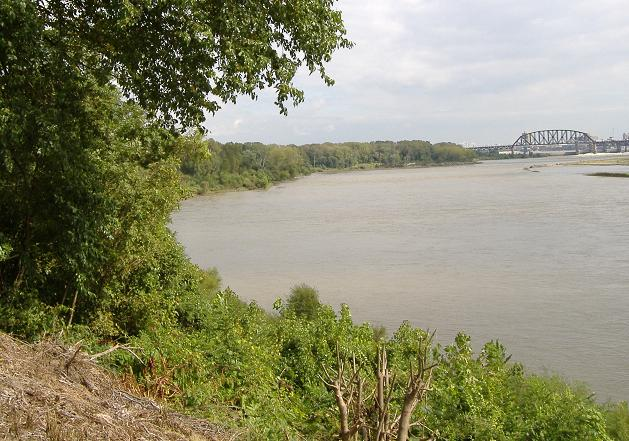
Where the Indiana Canal would have been built

The Indiana Canal Company was a corporation first established in 1805 for the purpose of building a canal around the Falls of the Ohio on the Indiana side of the Ohio River. After several attempts, and possible sabotage by a supporter of the Louisville and Portland Canal, the project was ended.

== History ==
As the Midwestern United States became populated by American settlers, they began to farm produce down the Ohio River to the Mississippi River and New Orleans to be sold. Along this entire route there was only one obstacle, the Falls of the Ohio, a series of rapids between Clarksville, Indiana, and Louisville, Kentucky. At that location goods had to be unloaded from boats, transported by land to below the falls, and reloaded. This caused a considerable delay for transportation and led to the early growth in the area which responded by creating enterprises to accommodate the needs of moving the goods. The expense caused by the need to transport goods overland for the three-mile (4.8 km) stretch was considerable and the price incurred by Cincinnati goods alone was estimated to cost over $50,000 annually.

As early as 1790 it was proposed that a canal be built around the falls so that shipping could easily bypass the rapids. Both Indiana and Kentucky competed to be the first to build a canal, knowing whichever side built the canal would receive a large economic boost. Early promoters of the project included Josiah Stephens and Benjamin Hovey, both of whom believed the canal would create a rapid influx of wealth to Indiana.

== First company ==
Indiana began formal plans to build a canal before Kentucky, authorizing the first Indiana Canal Company on August 24, 1805. The charter was considered favorable, fixing tolls between two and five dollars. The company's board members were made up mostly of men from Clarksville and included Aaron Burr, Davis Floyd and George Rogers Clark. The Indiana Territory granted the company $120,000 in starting money, and the enterprise raised more than $1.2 million from private sources.

The company surveyed a route around the falls through a deep, downhill ravine that began near the mouth of the Cane Run creek and continued downhill past the falls, where it opened back into the Ohio River Valley. The plan was to dam the creek near its mouth at the Ohio River, forcing it down into the ravine where it would wash out the valley creating a natural canal. The redirected creek could then be connected to the Ohio River by a lock. The surveyors believed that this route would be far easier to build and cheaper than the cost of digging a route on the opposing side of the river.

The initial company failed before the construction was begun and completely fell apart after the Aaron Burr conspiracy was revealed. Floyd was briefly jailed for part in the plot, and Burr was charged with treason and jailed. Many believed the company was a front to gather funds for Burr's failed plot, but it was never proven that any money was misappropriated as the treason charges were dropped on lack of evidence and no further inquiry was made.

== Second and third company ==
In 1817 Indiana created a second canal company, the Ohio Canal Company. Governor Jonathan Jennings, who was intent on increasing the economic viability of the new state, saw the canal as a way to quickly enhance Indiana's economy. This time the charter for the company provided $1 million in starting funds and gave the board a wider representation from Indiana's now larger population to prevent any possible graft by local members. The charter gave the company tax-free status and power of eminent domain. The company was not able to draw enough investments for the project and in 1818 a third canal company, the Jeffersonville Ohio Canal Company, was created and given the additional powers of settings its own tolls and raising up to $100,000 by a lottery.

By 1819 the company had progressed enough to begin construction. The Cane Run was dammed and forced into the ravine as planned by the first company. The canal was expected to be 2.75 miles (4.43 km) long with an average depth of 45 feet (14 m) and a width that narrowed from 100 feet (30 m) across at the top to 500 feet (150 m) across at the bottom.

Work was progressing well along until the dam failed. Maurice Thompson claimed that someone from the rival canal company in Louisville had sabotaged the dam. Portland newspapers had been criticizing the canal and many of its residents were openly opposed to a construction of any canal, knowing that without the necessity to transport good overland, Portland's businesses would not be needed anymore. It is also possible the earthen dam was the victim of muskrats who destroyed millions of dollars' worth of Indiana canals in the 1830s by burrowing through them. The subsequent Panic of 1819 made raising additional funds difficult, and without the means to continue construction the company folded.

== Aftermath ==
Without the funds to repair the dam and begin construction again, the project was allowed to languish. The Indiana General Assembly raised the topic again in 1824 and a commission was appointed, whose members included Christopher Harrison, to study the feasibility of trying to restart the project. After reporting on their findings, the commission was ended. The General Assembly discussed restarting the company but no action was again undertaken to attempt to build a canal on the Indiana side of the River. The debate ended in 1825 when the Louisville and Portland Canal secured federal funding, which virtually guaranteed its success. It was completed in 1831 and was instantly very profitable. The L & P Canal was still in operation in 2008 as part of the McAlpine Locks and Dam.

In 1867 and 1868 a detailed and comprehensive study was conducted by the United States War Department on the feasibility of a "Ship canal around the falls of the Ohio". A report was submitted to congress in 1869 but was never acted upon.

The loss of the canal was a local disaster for Clarksville. Local industry had been building with the expectation that Clarksville would become a major trading hub. The project had focused state attention on the improvement of the area and now many of the state plans where ruined. The state prison had been established in Jeffersonville so criminals could be used to labor on the canal, and other favorable projects had been granted to the area to improve the possibility of a canal. The loss left Clarksville to languish and into a population decline, whereas Jeffersonville began to grow quickly. Seeing the prosperity the L & P Canal brought, Indiana decided to build a series of Canals across the northern part of the state including the Wabash and Erie Canal.

== See also ==
- Burr conspiracy
- Louisville and Portland Canal

== Sources ==
- Dunn, Jacob Piatt (1919). Indiana and Indianans. Chicago and New York: American Historical Society. OCLC 2470354.
- Fatout, Paul (1961). "Canal Agitation at Ohio Falls". Indiana Magazine of History. 57 (4): 279–309.
