= Falls of the Ohio National Wildlife Conservation Area =

Bi-state area near Louisville, Kentucky, US

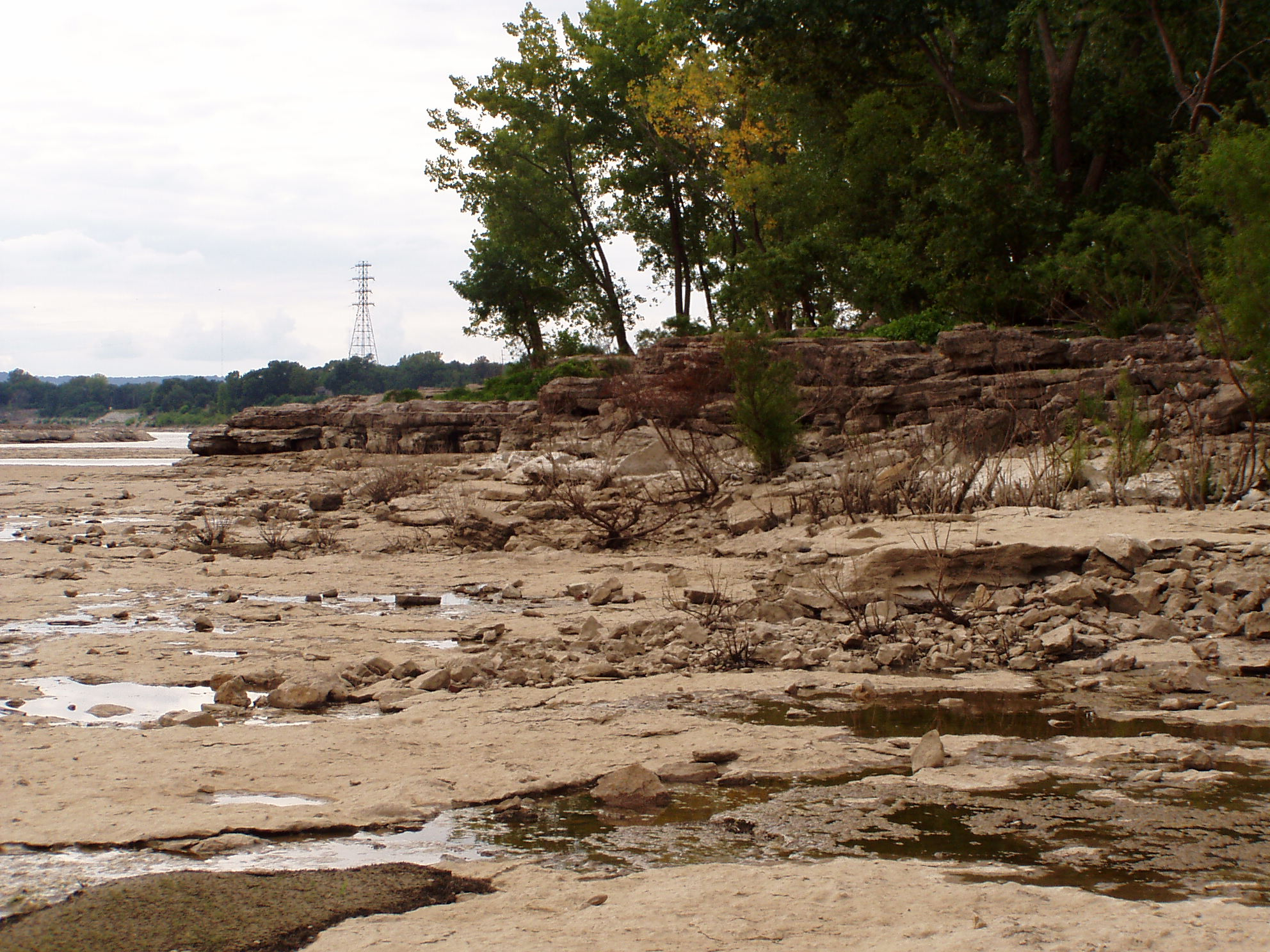
- Fossil formations at the shores of the Ohio River in Clarksville
- Interactive map of Falls of the Ohio National Wildlife Conservation Area
- Location: Indiana, Kentucky
- Nearest city: Louisville, Kentucky
- Coordinates: 38.27665°N 85.76544°W
- Established: 1981

U.S. National Natural Landmark
- Designated: 1966

The Falls of the Ohio National Wildlife Conservation Area is a national, bi-state area on the Ohio River near Louisville, Kentucky, in the United States, administered by the U.S. Army Corps of Engineers in partnership with the Indiana Department of Natural Resources. Federal status was awarded in 1981. The falls were designated a National Natural Landmark in 1966.

== Overview ==
The Falls, circa 1929

The area is located at the Falls of the Ohio, which was the only navigational barrier on the river in earlier times. The falls were a series of rapids formed by the relatively recent erosion of the Ohio River operating on 386-million-year-old Devonian hard limestone rock shelves. Louisville, Kentucky, and the associated Indiana communities—Jeffersonville, Clarksville, and New Albany—all owe their existence as communities to the falls. In the late 18th century to early 19th century, the navigational obstacles the falls presented meant that river traffic could benefit from local expertise in navigating the 26-foot (7.9 m) drop made by the river over a distance of two miles (3 km). In their original form, the falls could be characterized more as rapids extending over a length of the river, than as a point-like discontinuity in a river such as Niagara Falls. Still, the falls provided a singular, dramatic, and daunting obstacle to navigation on this important inland waterway.

The first locks on the river, the Louisville and Portland Canal completed in 1830, were built within a bypass canal constructed to provide year-round navigation of the river. The falls were later largely covered by the McAlpine Locks and Dam, built by the Army Corps of Engineers. The taming of the Ohio River at the falls, with the attendant reduction in local flow velocity, has of late led to the covering over of the fossil beds by large and increasing quantities of low-velocity effluvia: although an impediment to viewing the fossils, this action serves to protect the portions of the falls covered over by sediment and therefore temporarily immune to direct weathering. However, a significant area of the fossil-rich Devonian limestone rock is still left exposed, and is accessible to visitors today. The best time for visitation is during the low water season of the Ohio River between August and October. Removal of fossils is prohibited.

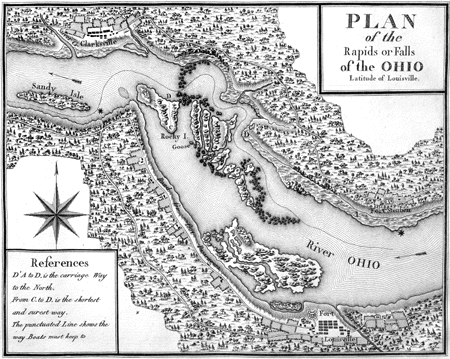
An early map of the Falls of the Ohio; Louisville, Kentucky is in the lower right

The shallowness of the falls provided a favored crossing point for bison in pre-settlement times and, later, an easy crossing for Native Americans.

In 1990, a section of the area in Indiana became the Falls of the Ohio State Park. An interpretive center is open throughout the year.

== Geology ==
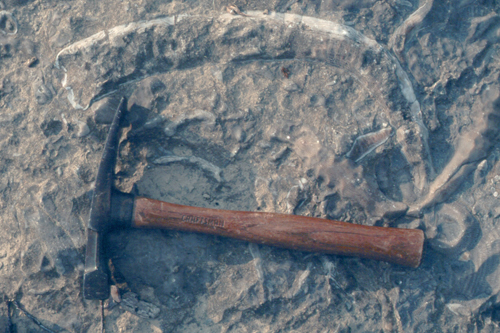
Large rugose coral (above hammer) in the Devonian Jeffersonville limestone at the Falls of the Ohio, near Louisville, Kentucky

The rock unit in which the falls are formed is referred to as the Jeffersonville limestone. The limestone formed approximately 387 to 380 million years ago during the Emsian Age (in the latest part of the Early Devonian Period) and the Eifelian Age (Middle Devonian). The exposure is unique—large and diverse tabulate corals and rugose corals are exposed in lifelike positions. Brachiopods and bryozoans are also present, as are gastropods (snails).

During the Devonian Period, the region lay at the bottom of a shallow inland sea about ten degrees north of the equator in the supercontinent of Euramerica.

== See also ==
- Geography of Louisville, Kentucky
- History of Louisville, Kentucky
- List of attractions and events in the Louisville metropolitan area
