= McAlpine Locks and Dam =

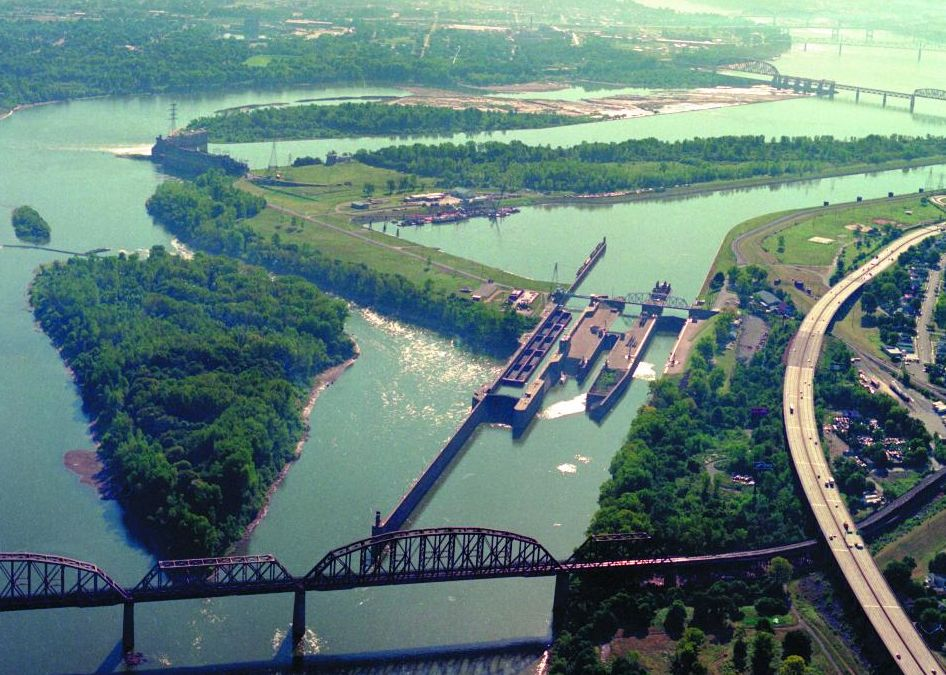
- McAlpine Locks and Dam prior to 2005, before the modernization project

- Location within Kentucky
- Official name: McAlpine Locks and Dam
- Location: Louisville, Kentucky
- Coordinates: 38.2781°N 85.7922°W
- Opening date: 1830
- Operator: United States Army Corps of Engineers Louisville District

Dam and spillways
- Impounds: Ohio River

Power Station
- Operator: Louisville Gas & Electric
- Installed capacity: 110 MW

The McAlpine Locks and Dam are a set of locks and a hydroelectric dam at the Falls of the Ohio River at Louisville, Kentucky. They are located at mile point 606.8, and control a 72.9-mile-long (117.3 km) navigation pool. The locks and their associated canal were the first major engineering project on the Ohio River, completed in 1830 as the 1.9-mile Louisville and Portland Canal, designed to allow shipping traffic to navigate through the Falls of the Ohio. The locks system is operated by the U.S. Army Corps of Engineers.

At present, the normal pool elevation is 420 feet (130 m) above sea level and the drainage area above the dam is 91,170 square miles (236,100 km^{2}). The average daily flow at McAlpine is 118,000 cubic feet per second (3,340 m^{3}/s). The lock chambers are located at the dam on the Kentucky side of the Ohio River and are capable of a normal lift of 37 feet (11 m) between the McAlpine pool upstream and the Cannelton pool downstream.

The hydroelectric plant is owned and operated by LG&E and KU, a subsidiary of PPL Corporation, while the locks are operated by the U.S. Army Corps of Engineers.

== History ==
=== Construction and early history ===
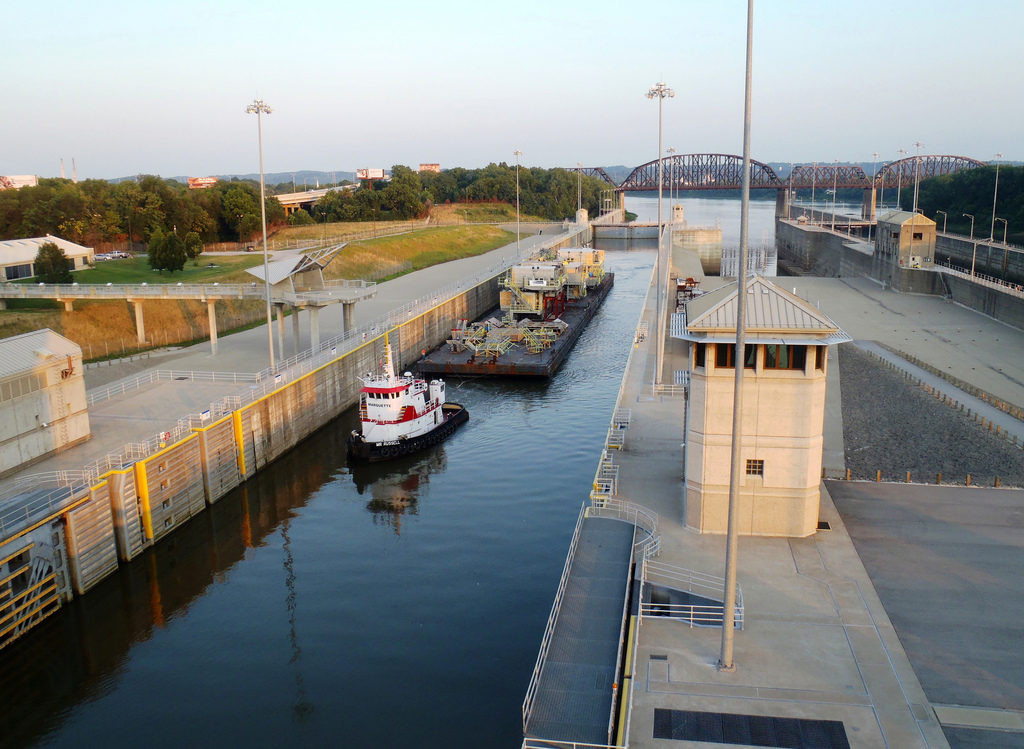
Tugboat at McAlpine Locks and Dam in 2012

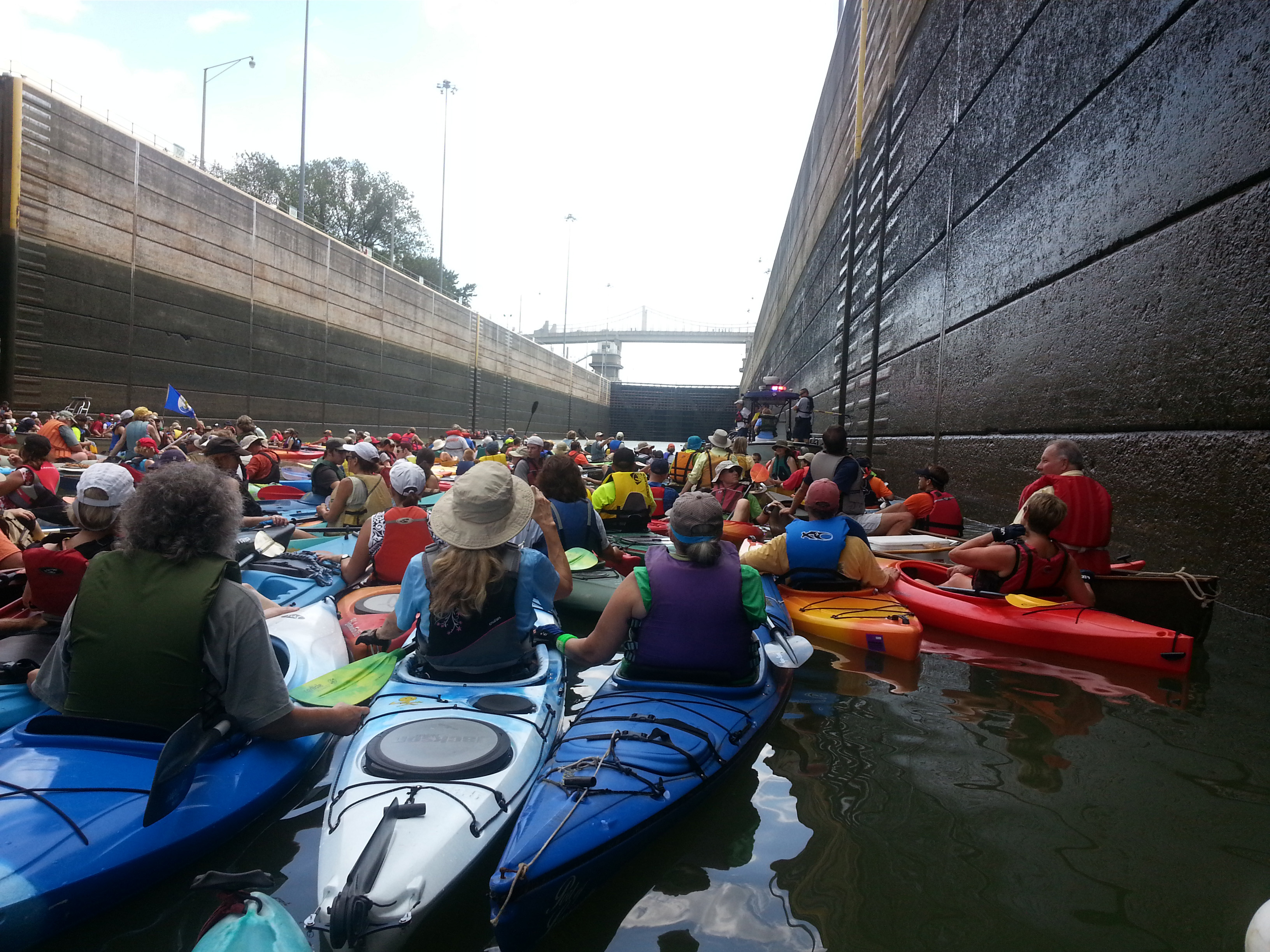
Paddling through McAlpine in 2013

The Falls of the Ohio, historically, was the only natural obstruction in the entire length of the Ohio River, with a rock reef forming a rapids of nearly 3 miles. "As early as the year 1802, the expense and delay attending the reshipment of freight around the falls had become so serious that numerous plans were proposed for overcoming the obstruction," according to the Corps of Engineers, leading to the construction of the Louisville and Portland Canal.

The first boat passed through the canal December 22, 1830. In the ensuing decades, many vessels on the Ohio River were too large for the locks, leading to more alterations to the infrastructure and culminating "in a combined navigation and hydroelectric development" in the 1920s.

The dam for generating hydroelectric power was added in 1927. The hydroelectric plant at the time was the seventh largest hydroelectric plant in the United States, and in its early years of operation, "provided most of the power needed to serve the city of Louisville," according to LG&E and KU. Today, it has a net generating capacity of 110 megawatts with eight turbine units in service.

The system was renamed the McAlpine Locks and Dam in 1960 in honor of William McAlpine, who was the only civilian to have ever served as district engineer for the Corps of Louisville.

In October 2003, McAlpine was designated a Historic Civil Engineering Landmark by the American Society of Civil Engineers.

=== Modernization ===
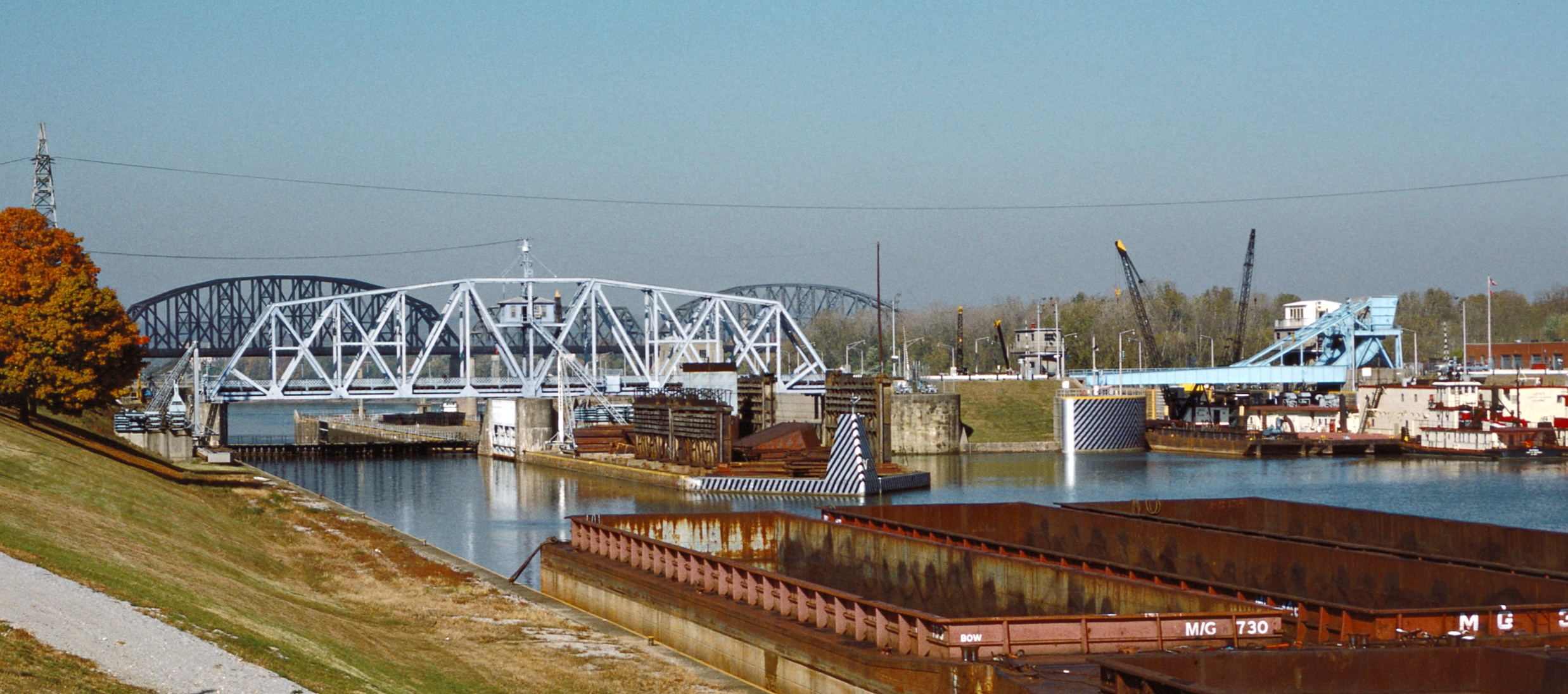
The old bridge above the locks in 1987

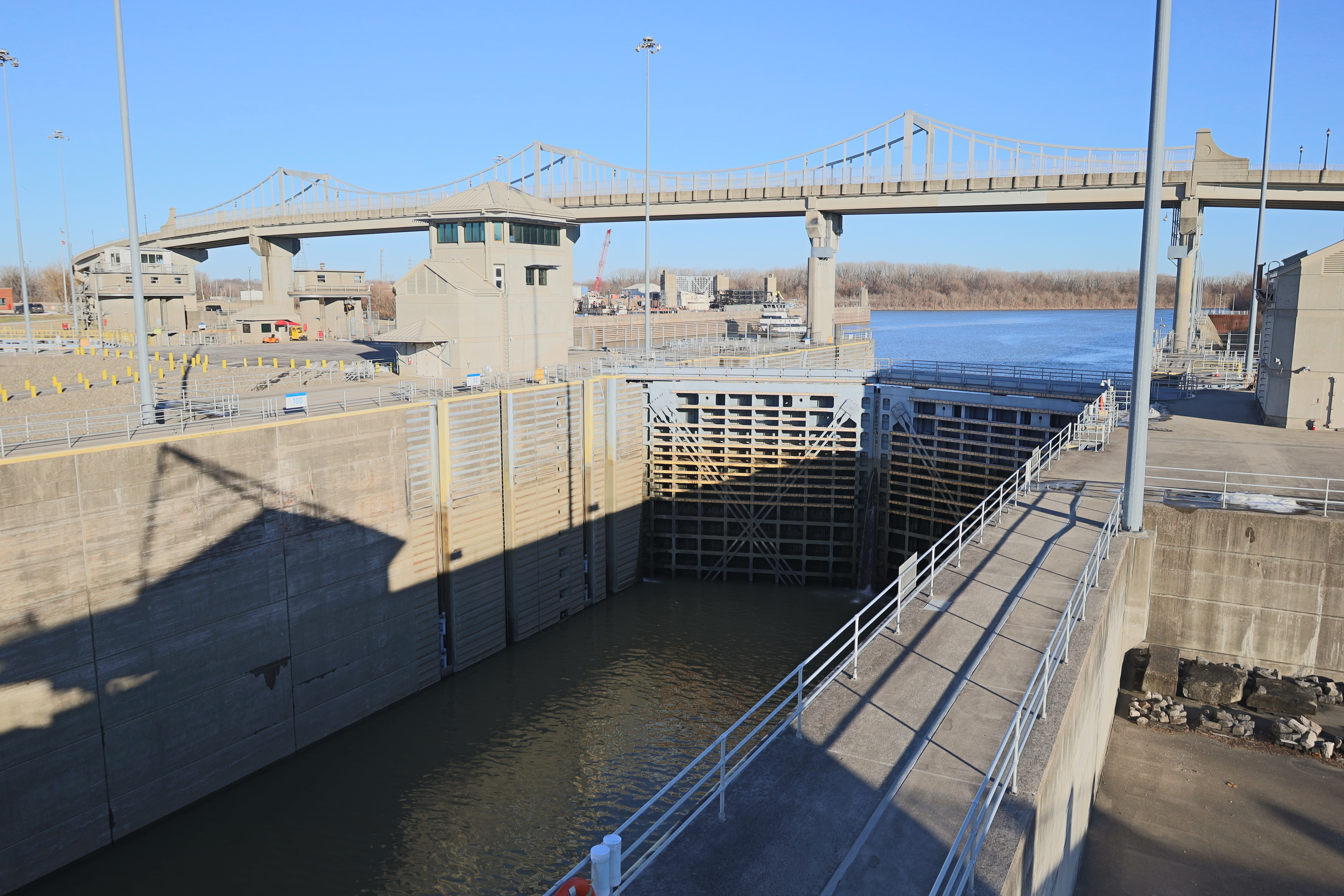
The lock in 2025, with the new bridge above it

The McAlpine locks underwent a 10-year, $278 million expansion project, completed in 2009. "This work replaced the 600’ and 360’ locks with a 1200’ x 110’ lock on the Kentucky bank side of the Louisville and Portland Canal adjacent to the existing lock," according to the Corps, "for efficient movement of projected increases in tow traffic." The original bridge carrying 27th Street across the locks, built in 1926–1927, included two moveable spans – one swing span and one bascule span – but these were removed in 2007 and replaced by a new two-lane, high fixed-span concrete bridge.

In 2019, the hydroelectric station also saw a modernization project, meant to give the dam another century of life. The station received some technological improvements, and computer modeling helped shape the turbines for maximum performance. "Even with these modern changes, much of the facility’s hardware remains intact from the 1920s," according to the utility. "The plant has retained its historic charm with original tile floors, wooden handrails, ornate light fixtures and a vintage control room."

== See also ==
- List of crossings of the Ohio River
- List of locks and dams of the Ohio River
- Transportation in Louisville, Kentucky
- List of attractions and events in the Louisville metropolitan area

== Gallery ==
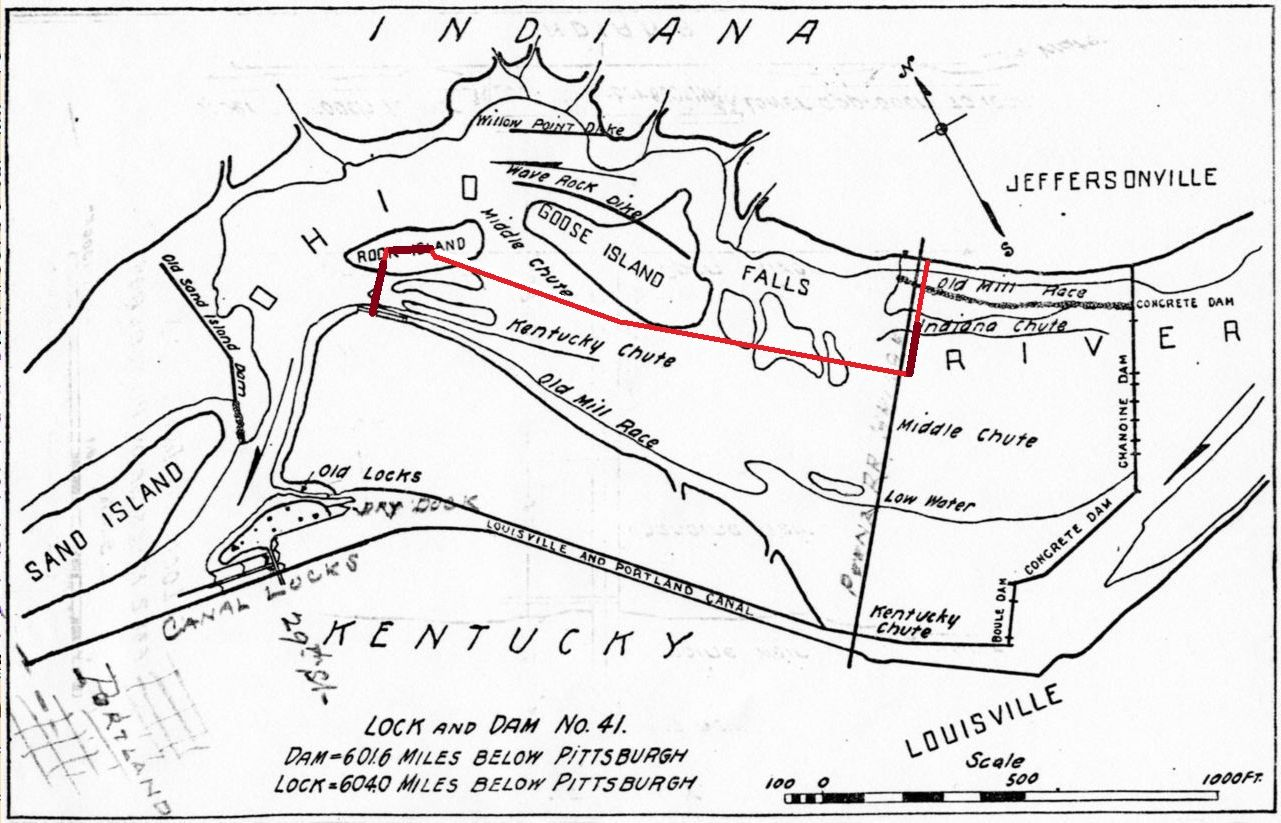
Chart of Falls of the Ohio and Portland Canal from 1916

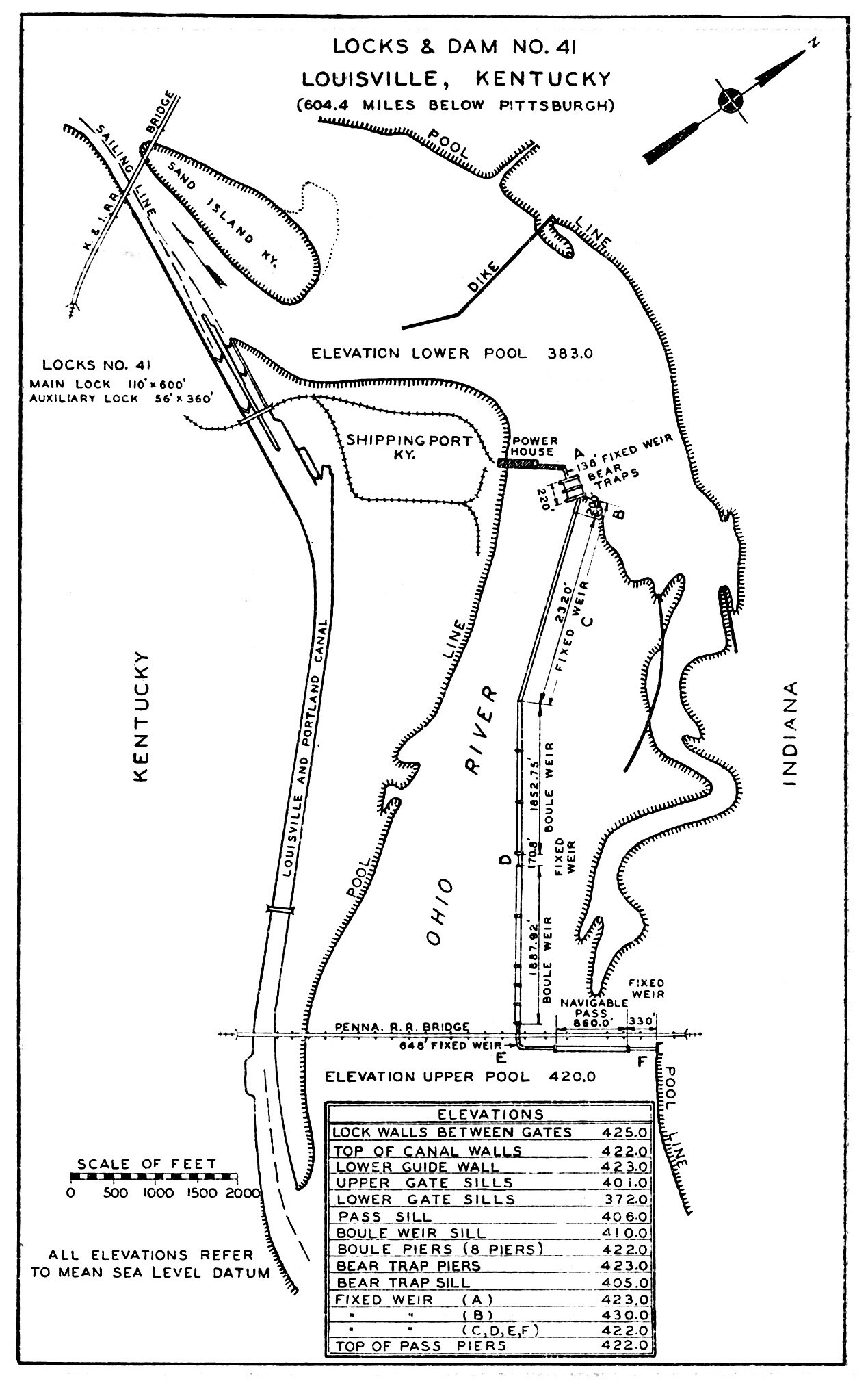
Locks and Dam No 41 navigation chart from 1934

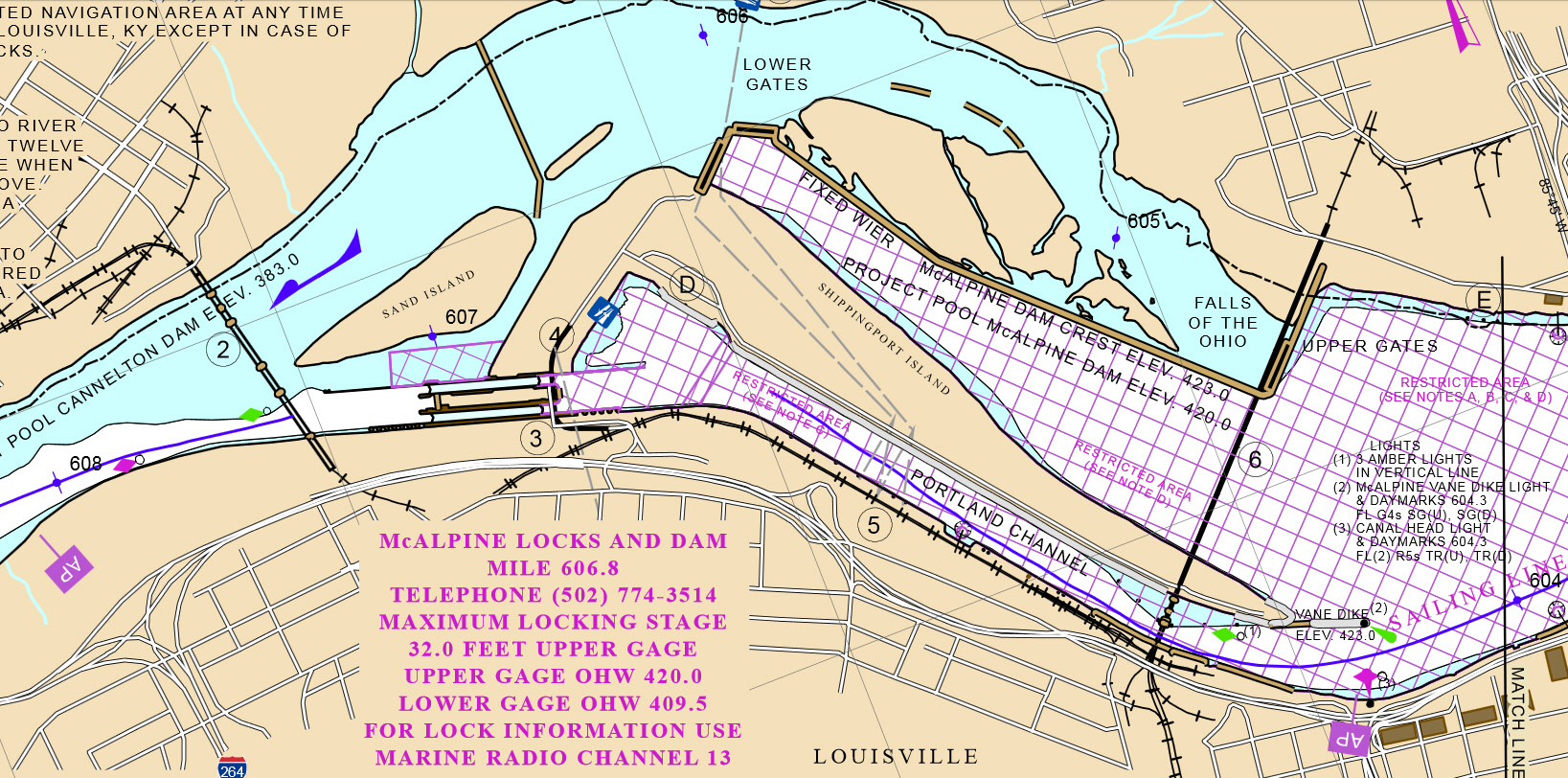
McAlpine Locks and Dam navigation chart (detail) from 2010

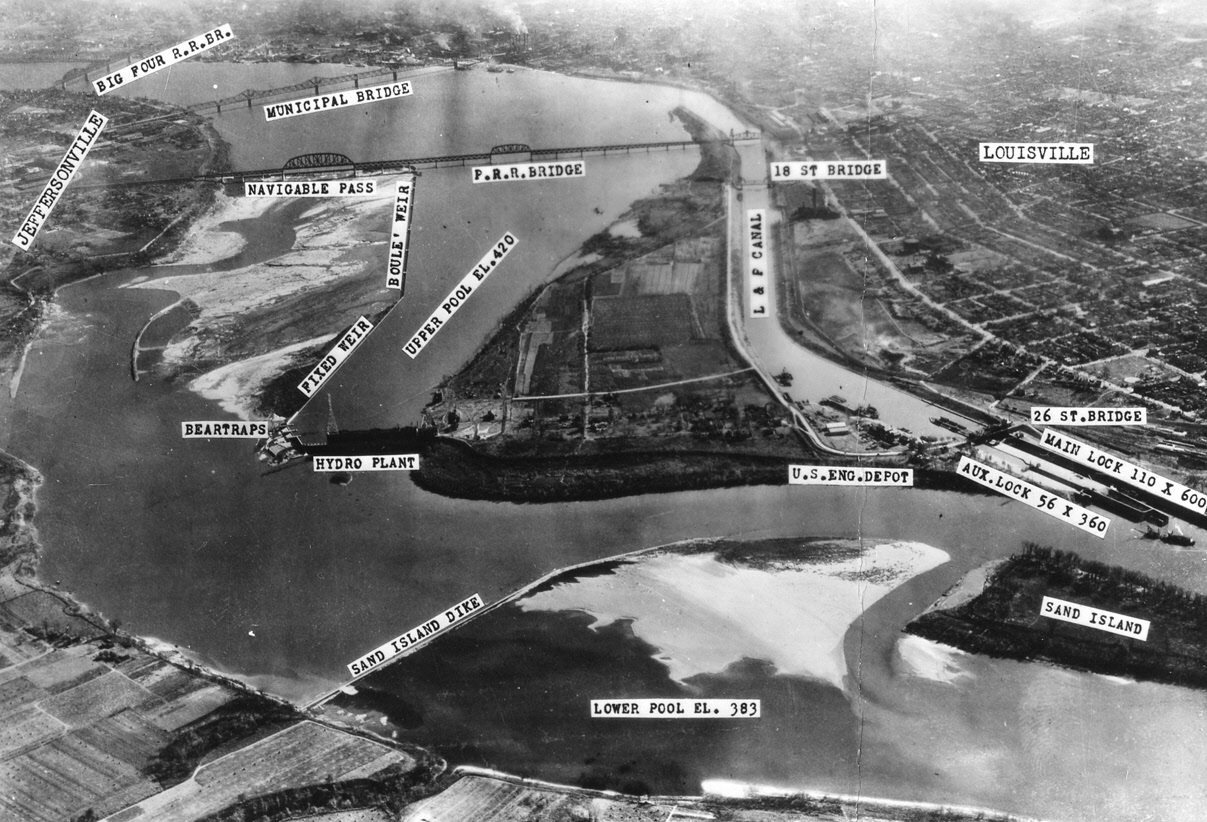
Aerial view of Falls of the Ohio and Locks and Dam No 41 circa 1930s or 1940s

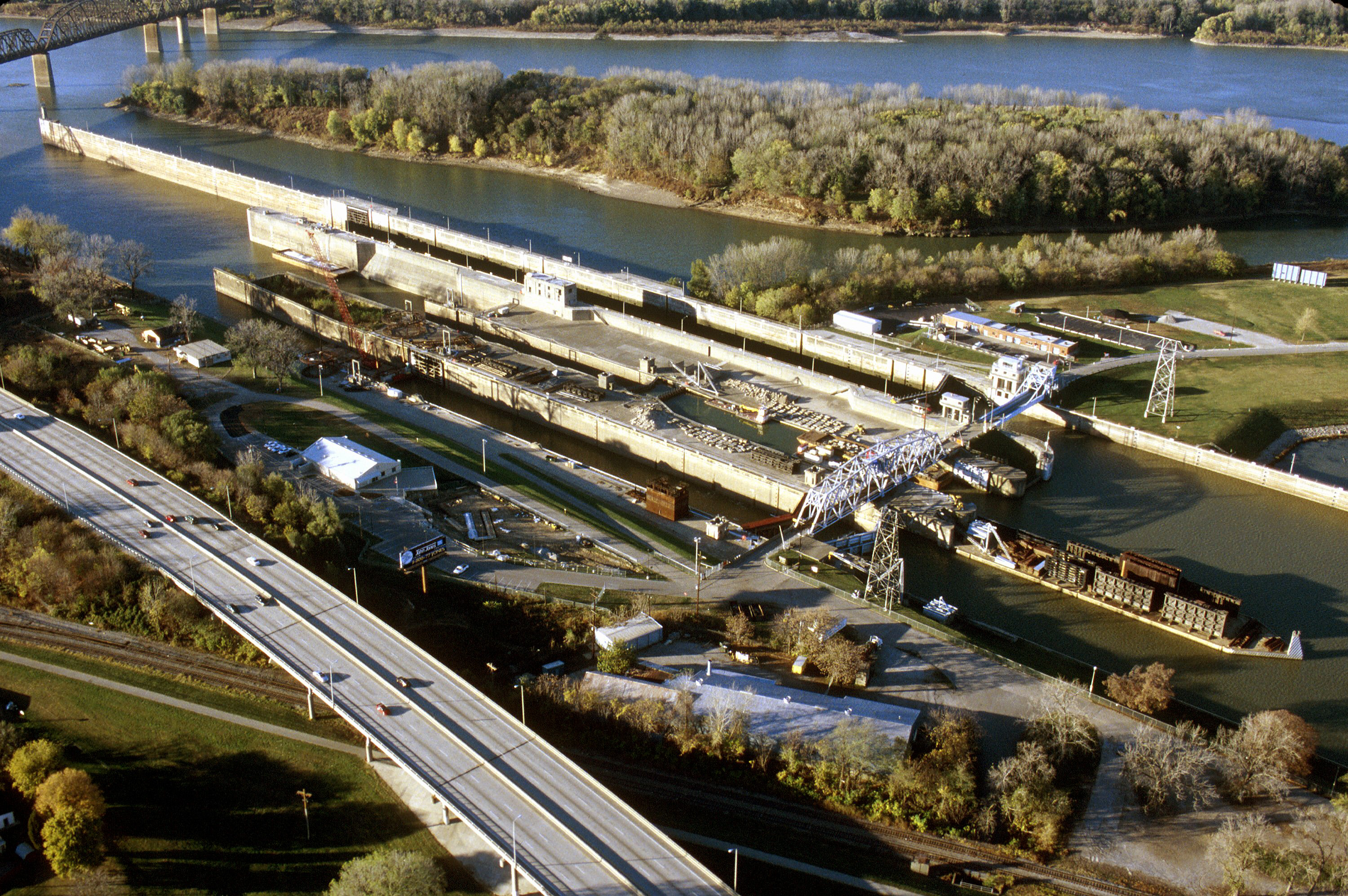
Aerial view of McAlpine Locks circa 2000

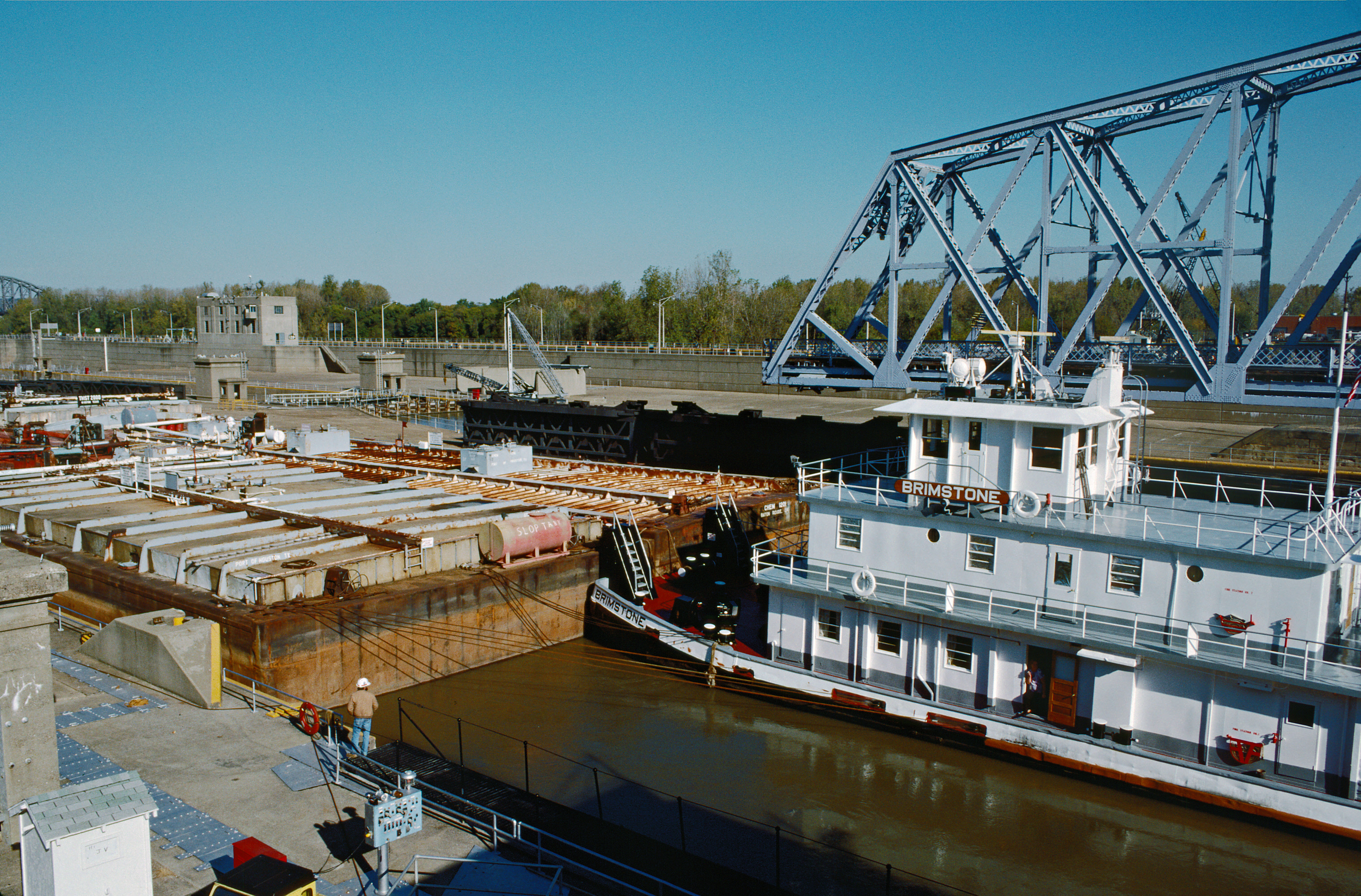
Towboat Brimstone entering auxiliary lock at McAlpine Locks, 1987

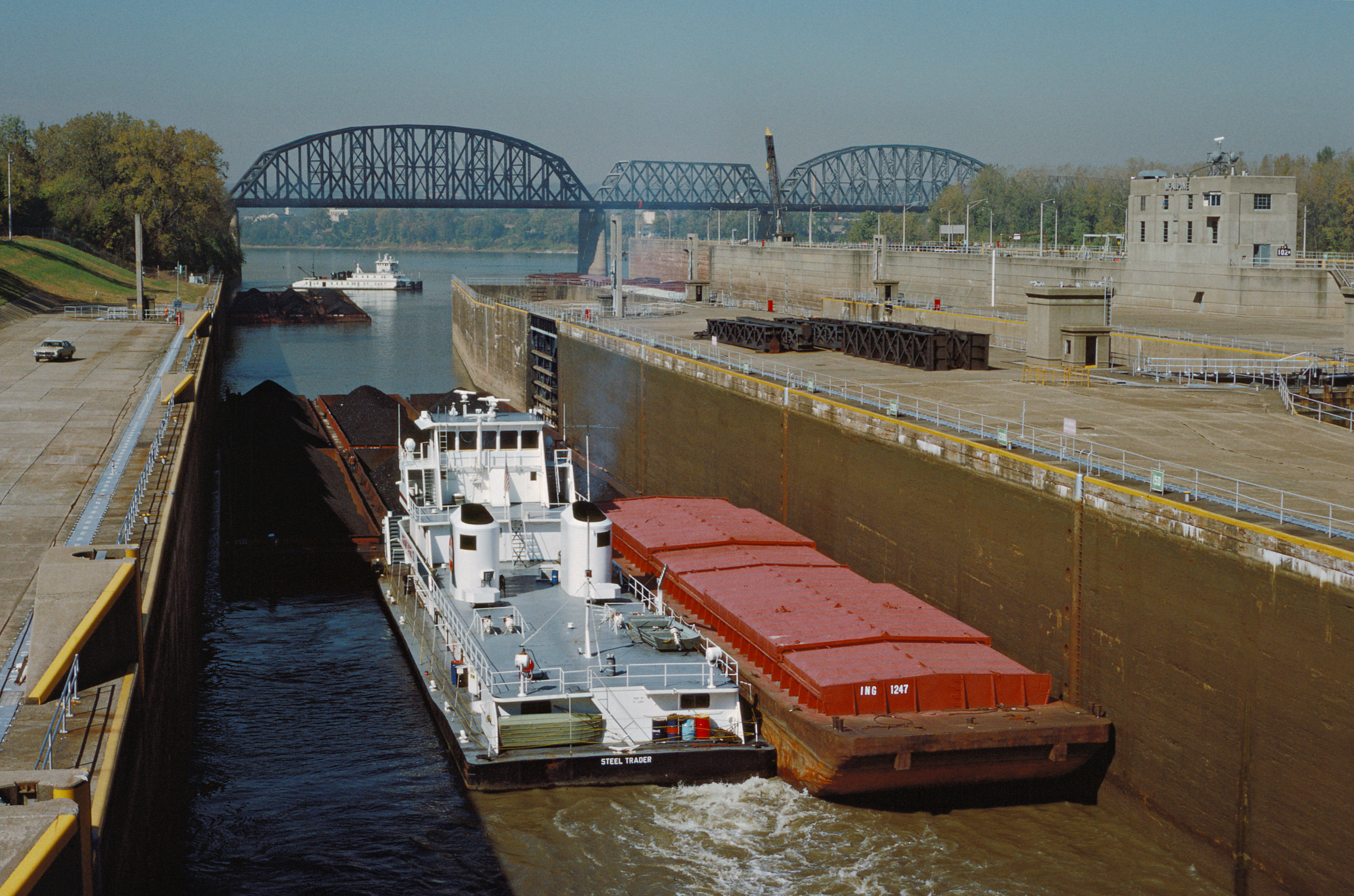
Towboat Steel Trader departing auxiliary lock at McAlpine Locks, 1987

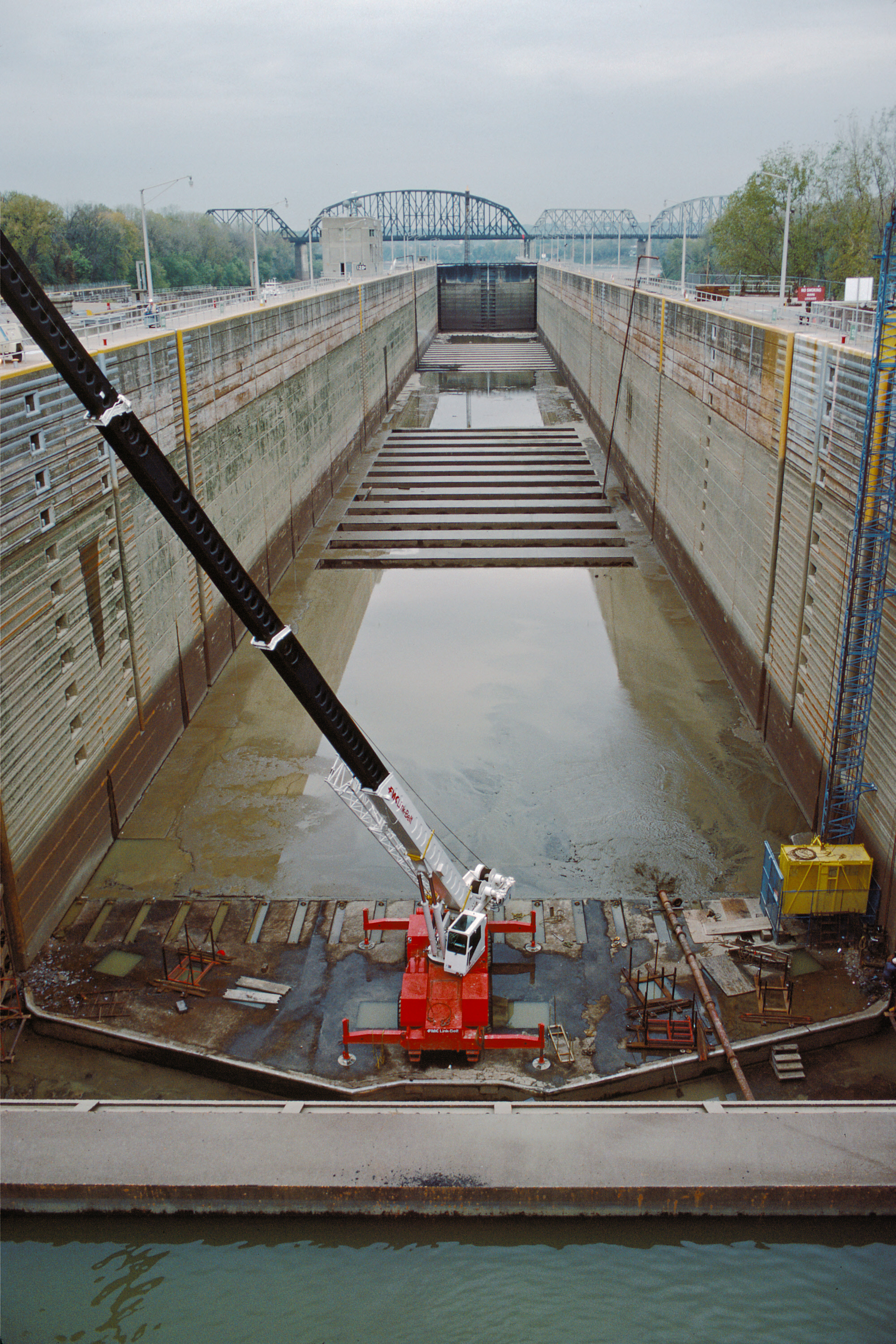
Dewatered main lock undergoing repairs at McAlpine Locks, 1987

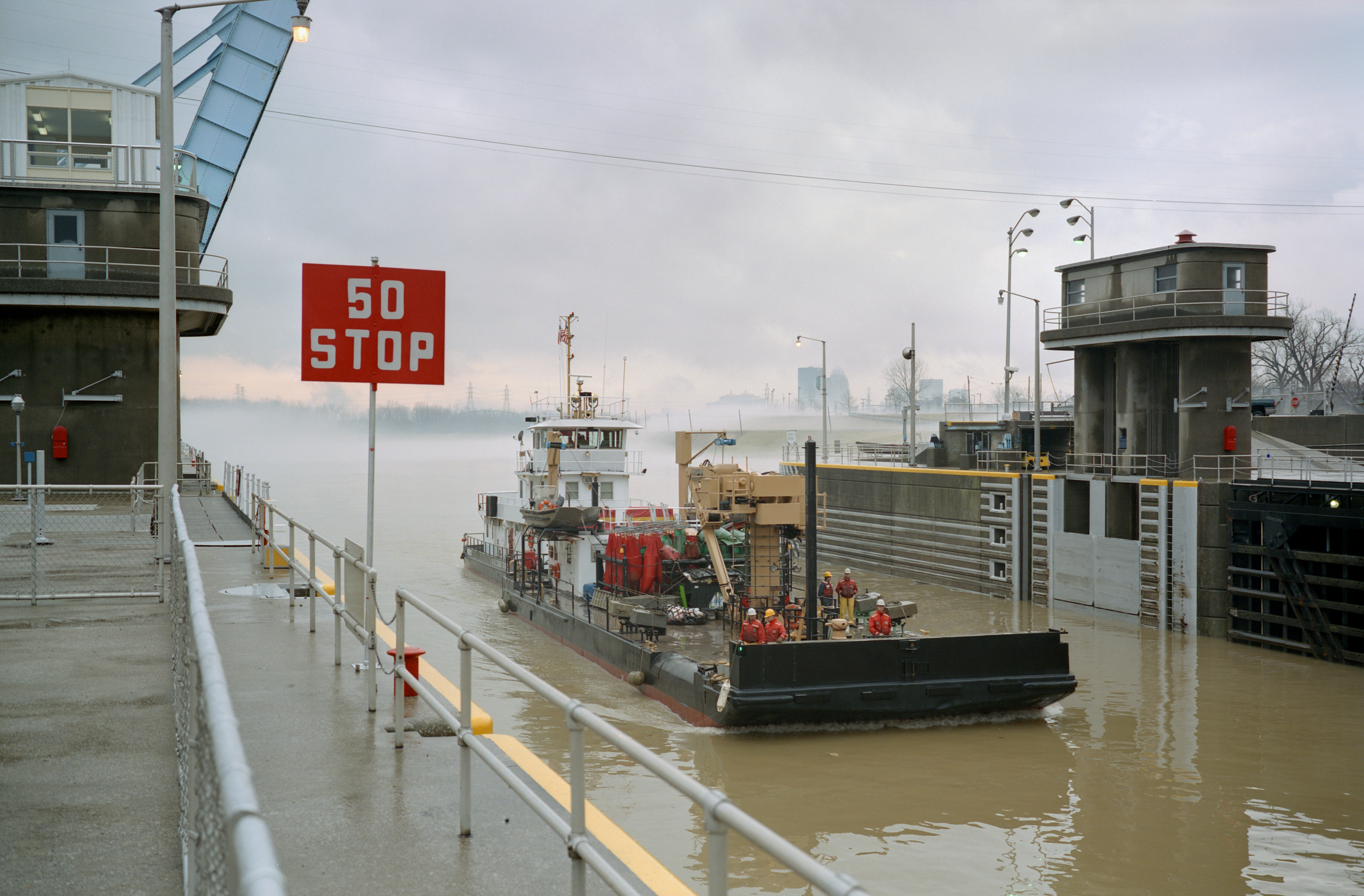
Coast Guard buoy tender Obion entering main lock at McAlpine Locks, 1999

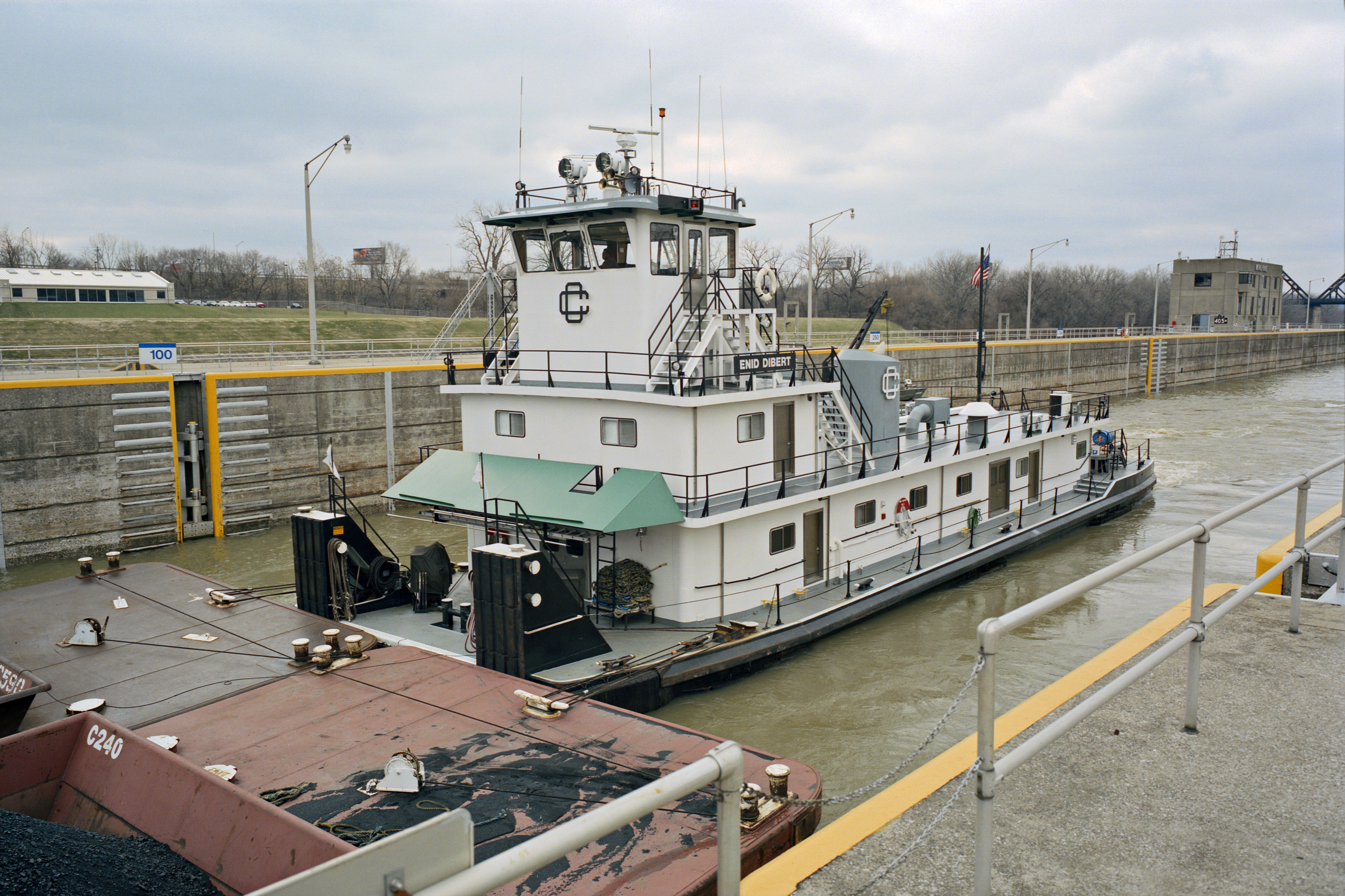
Towboat Enid Dibert departing main lock at McAlpine Locks, 1999

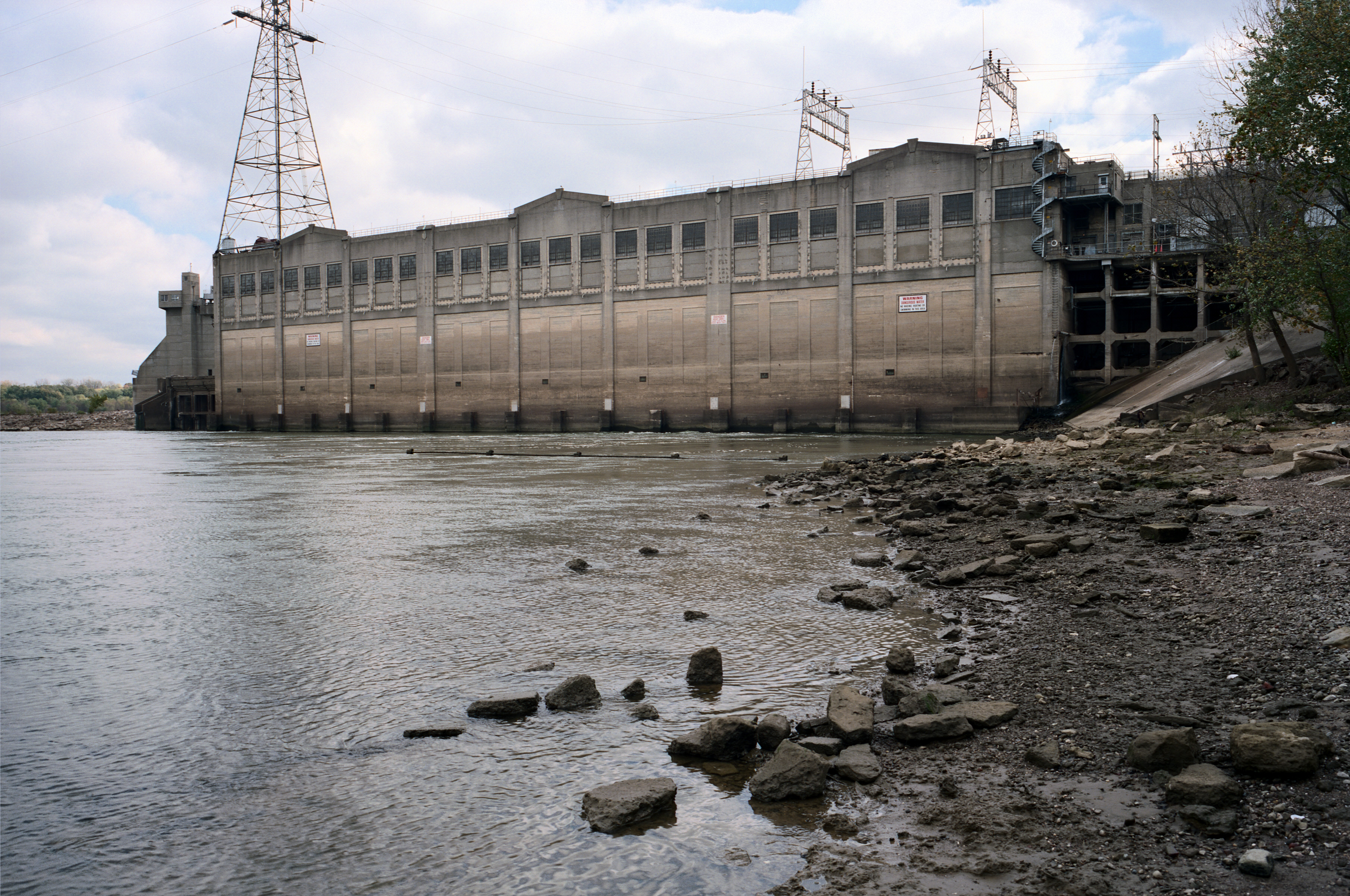
LG&E Ohio Falls Generating Station at McAlpine Dam, 1998

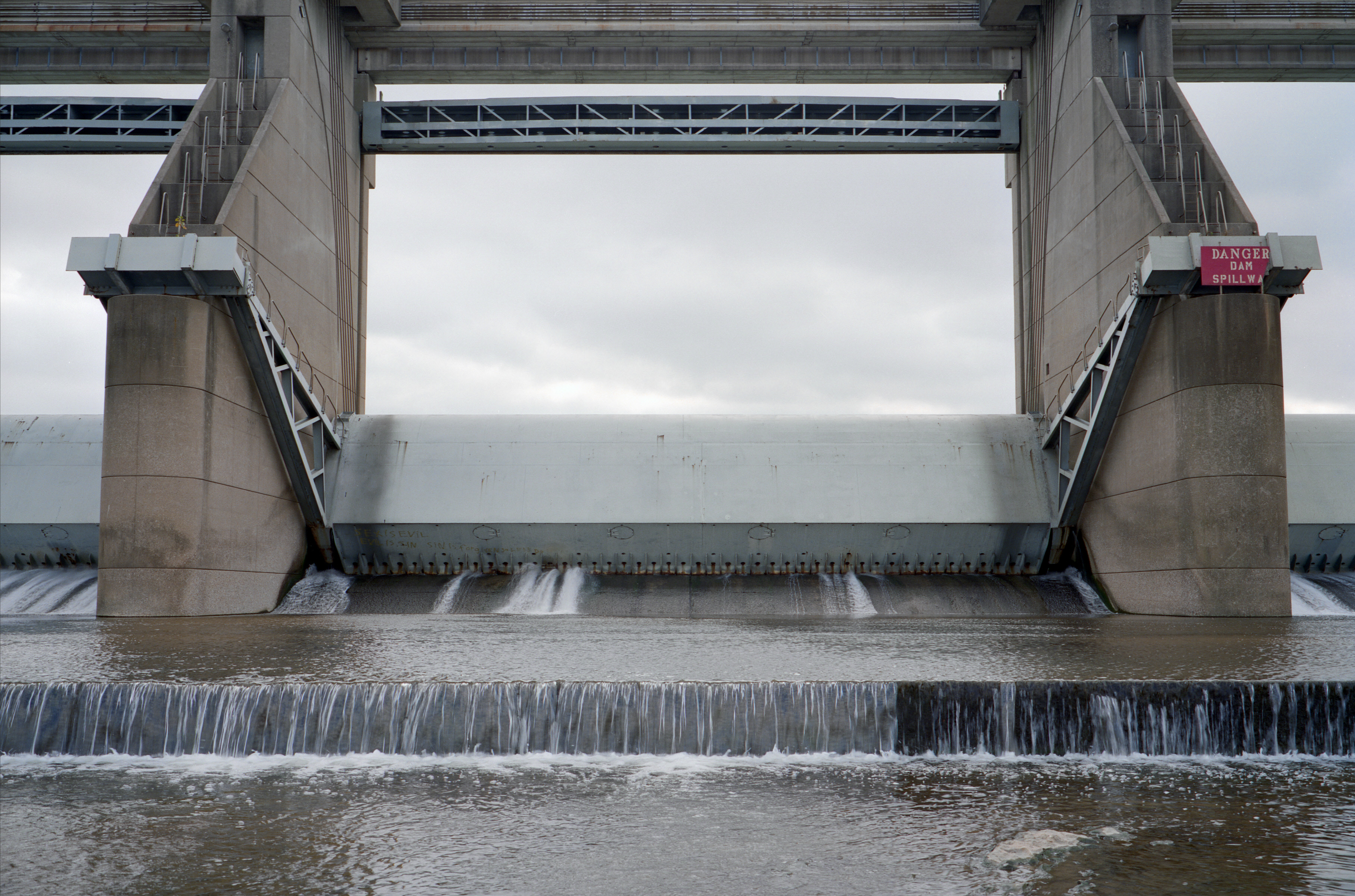
Tainter gate at McAlpine Dam, 1998

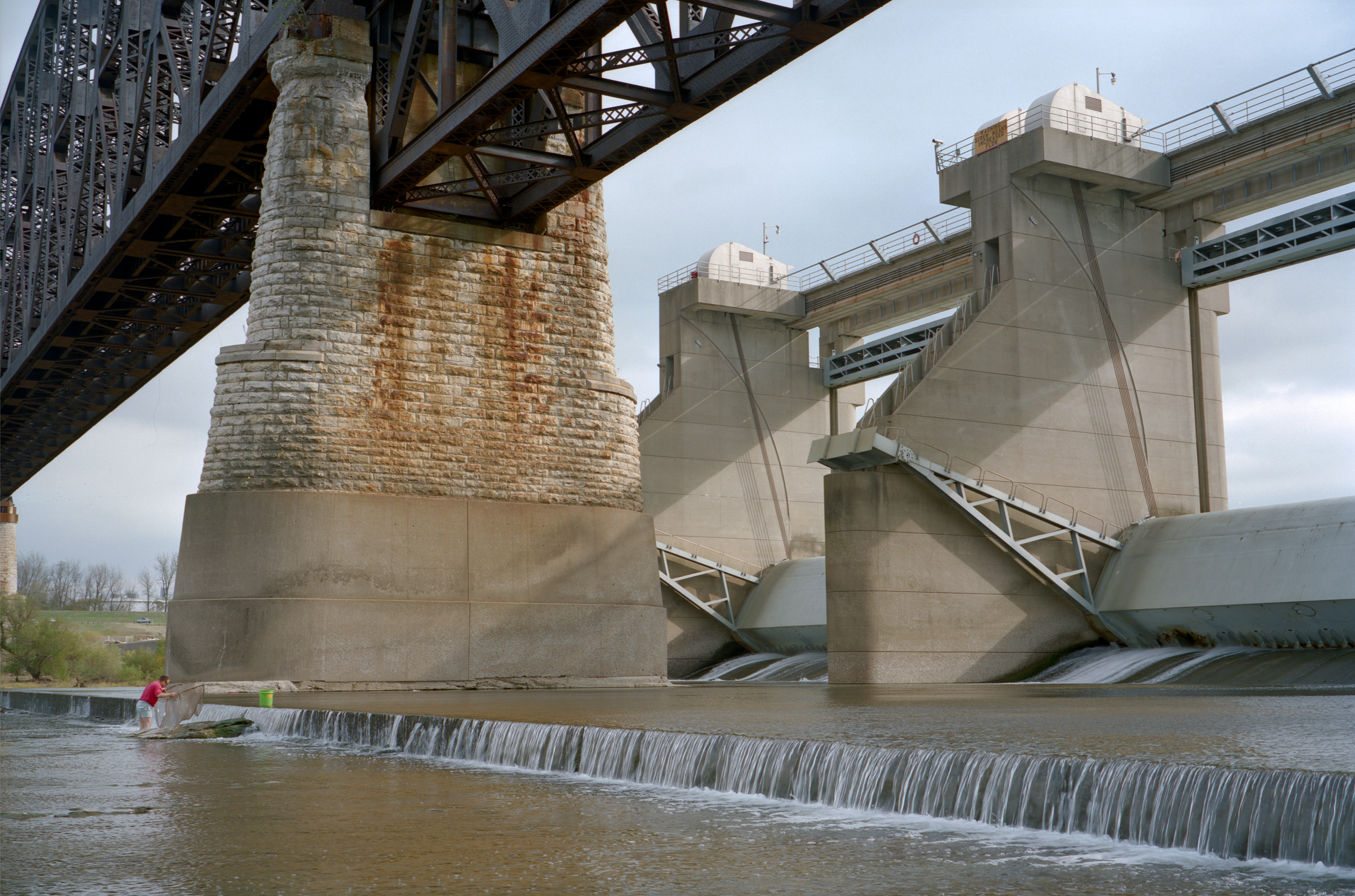
Fourteenth Street Bridge pier and upper gates of McAlpine Dam, 1998
