= National Register of Historic Places listings in Portland, Louisville, Kentucky =

This is a list of properties and historic districts on the National Register of Historic Places in the Portland neighborhood of Louisville, Kentucky (roughly bounded by the Ohio River on the north; N. 10th St. to the east; W. Market St. to the south; and I-264 and the Shawnee Golf Course to the west. Latitude and longitude coordinates of the 35 sites listed on this page may be displayed in a map or exported in several formats by clicking on one of the links in the adjacent box.

National Register sites elsewhere in Jefferson County are listed separately.

This National Park Service list is complete through NPS recent listings posted April 24, 2026.

== Current listings ==
	Name on the Register	Image	Date listed	Location	Description
1	Baker-Hawkins House	Baker-Hawkins House	August 21, 1980 (#80001593)	3603 W. Market St. 38°15′42″N 85°48′36″W	
2	C.A. Bridges Tobacco Warehouse	C.A. Bridges Tobacco Warehouse	September 8, 1983 (#83002640)	1719-1723 W. Main St. 38°15′34″N 85°46′45″W	
3	Brown Tobacco Warehouse	Brown Tobacco Warehouse	September 8, 1983 (#83002643)	1019-1025 W. Main St. 38°15′29″N 85°46′03″W	
4	Firehouse No. 13	Firehouse No. 13	March 10, 1981 (#81000284)	100 N. 34th St. 38°15′44″N 85°48′25″W	
5	Givens Headley and Co. Tobacco Warehouse	Givens Headley and Co. Tobacco Warehouse	September 8, 1983 (#83002672)	1119-1121 W. Main St. 38°15′30″N 85°46′09″W	
6	Greve, Burlage, and Company	Greve, Burlage, and Company	September 8, 1983 (#83002674)	312-316 N. 15th St. 38°15′43″N 85°46′28″W	
7	Greve, Buhrlage, and Company	Greve, Buhrlage, and Company	September 8, 1983 (#83002675)	1501 Lytle St. 38°15′41″N 85°46′28″W	
8	Benjamin Grove House	Benjamin Grove House	November 15, 1984 (#84000371)	518 N. 26th St. 38°16′13″N 85°47′27″W	
9	Hertel Pharmacy		February 11, 2021 (#100006154)	2565-2567 Bank St. 38°16′09″N 85°47′27″W	
10	Ideal Theatre	Ideal Theatre	September 8, 1983 (#83002686)	2315-2319 W. Market St. 38°15′33″N 85°47′20″W	
11	James F. Irvin House	James F. Irvin House	September 8, 1983 (#83002688)	2910 Northwestern Parkway; 38°16′30″N 85°47′40″W	
12	LeCompte Saloon		March 5, 2018 (#100002155)	3200 Rudd Ave. 38°16′35″N 85°47′59″W	
13	Louisville Lead & Color Co. Paint Factory & Warehouse		March 13, 2024 (#100010095)	1416-1426 Lytle St. 38°15′41″N 85°46′26″W	
14	Lower West Market Street District	Lower West Market Street District	November 4, 1982 (#82001561)	1500-2200 W. Market St. 38°15′28″N 85°46′51″W	
15	Meek-Miller House	Meek-Miller House	September 10, 1979 (#79001012)	3123 Northwestern Parkway; 38°16′31″N 85°47′54″W	
16	Monon Freight Depot	Monon Freight Depot	September 8, 1983 (#83002707)	1400 W. Main St. 38°15′30″N 85°46′24″W	
17	Montgomery Street School	Montgomery Street School	May 6, 1982 (#82002713)	2500-2506 Montgomery St. 38°16′18″N 85°47′19″W	
18	National Foundry and Machine Company	National Foundry and Machine Company	May 1, 1980 (#80001610)	1402 W. Main St. 38°15′30″N 85°46′28″W	
19	National Tobacco Work Branch Stemmery	National Tobacco Work Branch Stemmery	September 8, 1983 (#83002709)	2410-2418 W. Main St. 38°15′36″N 85°47′25″W	
20	National Tobacco Works	National Tobacco Works	September 8, 1983 (#83002710)	1800-1810 W. Main St. 38°15′32″N 85°46′50″W	
21	National Tobacco Works Branch Drying House	National Tobacco Works Branch Drying House	September 8, 1983 (#83002711)	2400 W. Main St. 38°15′36″N 85°47′24″W	
22	Peaslee-Gaulbert Warehouse	Peaslee-Gaulbert Warehouse	September 8, 1983 (#83002719)	1427 Lytle St. 38°15′41″N 85°46′27″W	
23	Planter's Tobacco Warehouse	Planter's Tobacco Warehouse	September 8, 1983 (#83002723)	1027-1031 W. Main St. 38°15′29″N 85°46′04″W	
24	Portland Historic District	Portland Historic District	February 21, 1980 (#80001615)	Roughly bounded by Missouri Ave., Pflanz Ave., Bank, N. 33rd, and N. 37th Sts.; also roughly bounded by West Market St. to the south, I-264 to the west, I-64 and the Ohio River to the north, and the Louisville and Indiana Railroad Line to the east 38°16′28″N 85°48′08″W	Includes the Squire Earick House. The second set of addresses represent a boundary increase approved April 30, 2026.
25	Portland Proper	Portland Proper	September 13, 2006 (#06000812)	31st St. and Northwestern Parkway; 38°16′42″N 85°48′18″W	
26	J.V. Reed and Company	J.V. Reed and Company	September 8, 1983 (#83002725)	1100 W. Main St. 38°15′28″N 85°46′06″W	
27	Theodore Roosevelt Elementary School	Theodore Roosevelt Elementary School	March 22, 1982 (#82002719)	222 N. 17th St. 38°15′41″N 85°46′41″W	
28	St. Cecilia School Building	St. Cecilia School Building	November 26, 2004 (#04001252)	2530 Slevin St. 38°15′54″N 85°47′30″W	
29	St. Patrick's Roman Catholic Church, Rectory, and School	St. Patrick's Roman Catholic Church, Rectory, and School	March 1, 1982 (#82002723)	1301-1305 W. Market St. 38°15′26″N 85°46′19″W	
30	Shafer's Hall		March 18, 2019 (#100003478)	617 N. 27th St. 38°16′21″N 85°47′29″W	
31	Steam Engine Company No. 4	Steam Engine Company No. 4	November 7, 1980 (#80004497)	1617 W. Main St. 38°15′33″N 85°46′38″W	
32	Thornburgh House	Thornburgh House	December 8, 1983 (#83003735)	376 N. 26th St. 38°16′00″N 85°47′35″W	
33	Tobacco Realty Company	Tobacco Realty Company	September 8, 1983 (#83002742)	118-126 N. 10th St. 38°15′31″N 85°46′00″W	
34	U.S. Marine Hospital	U.S. Marine Hospital	January 9, 1978 (#78001368)	2215 Portland Ave. 38°16′14″N 85°47′04″W	
35	Western Junior High School	Western Junior High School	September 8, 1983 (#83002748)	2201 W. Main St. 38°15′37″N 85°47′12″W	
36	Wrampelmeier Furniture Company	Wrampelmeier Furniture Company	September 8, 1983 (#83002754)	226-228 N. 15th St. 38°15′40″N 85°46′29″W	

== Former listings ==
	Name on the Register	Image	Date listed	Date removed	Location	Description
1	William G. Meier Warehouse		September 8, 1983 (#83002704)	December 11, 2009	2100 Rowan St. 38°15′40″N 85°47′04″W	
2	National Tobacco Works Warehouse		September 8, 1983 (#83002712)	December 11, 2009	101-113 S. 24th St. 38°15′35″N 85°47′20″W	

== See also ==
- National Register of Historic Places listings in Jefferson County, Kentucky
- List of National Historic Landmarks in Kentucky
- List of attractions and events in the Louisville metropolitan area
