= Mary Millicent Miller =

Steamboat master

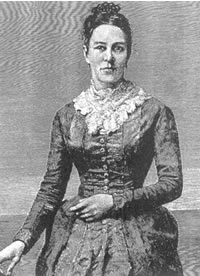
- Born: 1846; Portland, Kentucky, United States
- Died: October 30, 1894 (aged 47–48); Portland, Kentucky, United States
- Resting place: Portland Cemetery
- Other name: Mary Millicent Garretson
- Occupation: Steamboat master
- Years active: 1884–1891
- Known for: First American woman with a steamboat master's license
- Spouse: George Miller (m. 1865)
- Children: 4

Mary Millicent Miller (née Mary Millicent Garretson; 1846 – October 30, 1894) was an American steamboat master who was the first American woman to acquire a steamboat master's license.

== Biography ==
Miller was born in 1846 in Portland, Kentucky to Andrew and Luanna Garretson. The daughter of a steamboat engineer she was immersed into a life on the river. On August 3, 1865, she married widower George 'Old Natural' Miller; a well respected steamboat builder and pilot. Together they had four children Lula Ann, Georgia, Emily, and Norman as well as three children from George's previous marriages. During the summer months they would live in a house in Portland where George Miller built boats on Shippingport Island. One such boat was the Saline; a 178-ton steamboat. During the fall, winter, and occasionally spring months of the year the Millers and their children would travel to New Orleans on the Saline and live on the boat while transporting freight and people on the Mississippi, Red, Ouchita, and Ohio Rivers.

While sailing the Saline Mary Miller would serve as the ship's clerk and bookkeeper while George piloted it and a son from George's previous marriage acted as the engineer. In 1883 in an attempt to put the Millers out of business a competing steamboat company, the Banks Line, informed the Steamboat Inspection Service (SIS) that George was acting as both the master and the pilot of his steamboat. A criminal offense. When questioned by the SIS George confirmed that he was, indeed, the pilot but that Mary was the ship's master and that she would be applying for a steamboat master's license as George himself wasn't eligible for the certification due to color blindness.

When Miller applied for a license the New Orleans Inspector of Hulls office was unsure if it could license a woman. Inspector George L. Norton believed it was improper for a woman to hold such a position and did not render a decision for eight months. After which in November 1883 he sent her application to the Secretary of the Treasury in Washington, D.C. Upon receiving her application Secretary Charles J. Folger was equally bewildered and to which he asked "has Mrs. Miller a husband living?" In January 1884 Secretary Folger rendered his decision and telegraphed the New Orleans office the "Mrs. Miller should be granted her license if she were fit for performing the duties required, without regard to her sex".

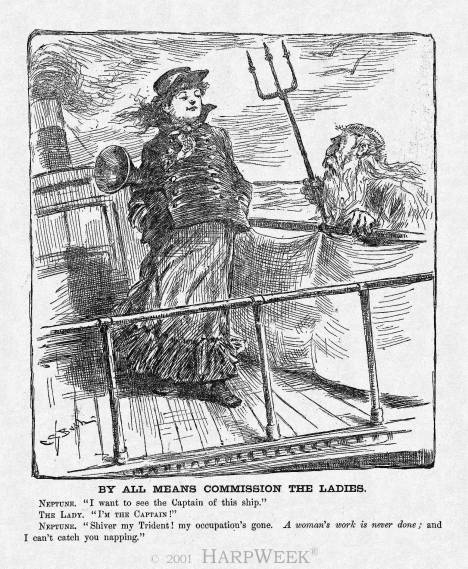
Political cartoon from Harper's Weekly promoting issuing women steamboat master licenses

Miller passed the examinations and was formally granted her master's license on February 16, 1884, at the age of thirty-eight. That same day, Harper's Weekly ran a cartoon entitled, "By All Means Commission The Ladies" and her picture appeared in the same publication on March 8, 1884. Respected steamboat masters publicly proclaimed her great skill in New Orleans newspapers, while her accomplishment allowed for other females to become steamboat pilots and masters.

By 1890 competition from the expanding railroad industry was hurting the steamboat business. That coupled with George Miller's advanced age led the Millers to sell the Saline and retire. While in Portland George built a sailboat named the Swan and in December 1891 the Millers sailed the swan towards New Orleans. Intending for Miller to become a lighthouse keeper in East Pascagoula, Mississippi. During the trip Miller became ill with what was believed to be hay fever. She returned to Portland and had the Swan towed back upriver by a coal boat. Within a year her condition worsened and her lower limbs became paralyzed. Miller would die in Portland on October 30, 1894, of paralysis and was later buried at Portland Cemetery.

== Legacy ==
Mary Miller was twice recognized in the 1990s for her pioneering effort. The American Merchant Marine Hall of Fame inducted her in 1993. In 1995 she was recognized by the National Rivers Hall of Fame. The Portland Museum keeps a permanent exhibit about her. In July 2017 the City of Louisville, Kentucky renamed the recently acquired riverboat the Georgia Queen to the Mary M. Miller in her honor.
