= Portland Christian School =

Coordinates: 38°16′52.2″N 85°35′44.0″W

- Louisville, KY

Information
- Type: Private school
- Established: 1924
- Head of School: Josh LeSage
- Colors: Green and White
- Athletics: Member of KHSAA
- Sports: Yes
- Mascot: Eagle
- Publication: Totem and Broadcaster
- Website: portlandchristian.org

Portland Christian School, based in Louisville, Kentucky, United States, is a private Christian school traditionally supported and affiliated with those Churches of Christ which held to a premillennial eschatology characteristic of Robert Henry Boll. Founded in 1924 in the rear of the Portland Avenue Church of Christ in the Portland neighborhood with Boll's support, today the school system has over four hundred students at its campus on the east side of Louisville. It was founded by Levi Kennedy

The former college-level division of PCS was the School of Biblical Studies, which became Kentuckiana Bible College. The college closed in 2018.

Portland Christian is operated by the non-profit Portland Christian School System, Inc., which was formed in 2005 after it and Portland Ave. Church of Christ decided that "the operations of the [school] system has outgrown the ability of the Church to administer".

== Tuition ==
Portland Christian School was started with a missionary emphasis and was operated as a tuition-free institution until 1986. That mission continues today with more than one-third of the cost of educating students coming from gifts given by churches, individuals, businesses and organizations interested in supporting Christian education. PCS provides tuition assistance for over 50% of its students, whose tuition is set based on the financial situation of the individual family as determined by an independent 3rd party.

== Accreditation ==
Portland Christian was first accredited by the Kentucky Board of Education in 1931, and is presently accredited by the Association of Christian Schools International, which is recognized by the state of Kentucky.

== Athletics ==
PCS is a charter member of the Kentucky Christian Athletic Conference and is a member of the Kentucky High School Athletic Association (KHSAA).

The PCS Eagles won the 1997, 1998, 1999, 2000, 2001, 2002, 2003, 2004, and 2005 KHSAA District 21 Baseball Championship.

Former PCS Athletic Director W. Eugene Schriener is a member of the Metro (Louisville) Area Athletic Directors Hall of Fame.

== Campuses ==
- Portland Campus, located at 2500 Portland Ave., is the historical home of the system. It currently is used for athletic events and meetings.
- The Kennedy Household was a temporary building for PCS
- Eastside Campus, which is located at 8509 Westport Road in the Plantation neighborhood in Louisville is the main campus of the school, including the PCS "Little School" for 2 1/2 to 5 year olds and Kindergarten to 12th grade. The Administrative offices are located at the Eastside Campus. The Eastside Campus is at the former St. Bernadette Parish on Westport Rd.
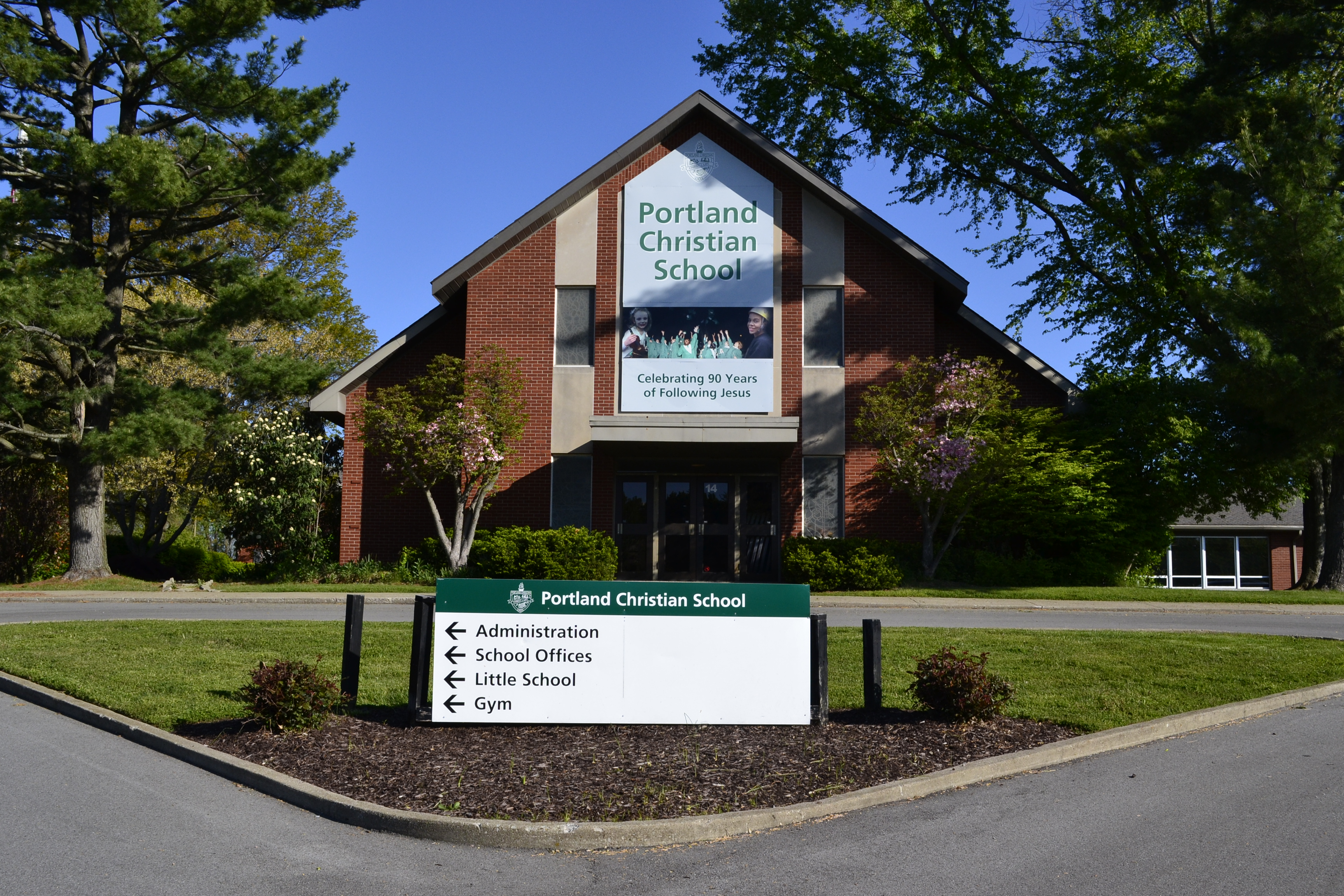
- PCS formerly owned and used the Montgomery Street School building in Portland as the elementary school.
