= History of the French in Louisville =

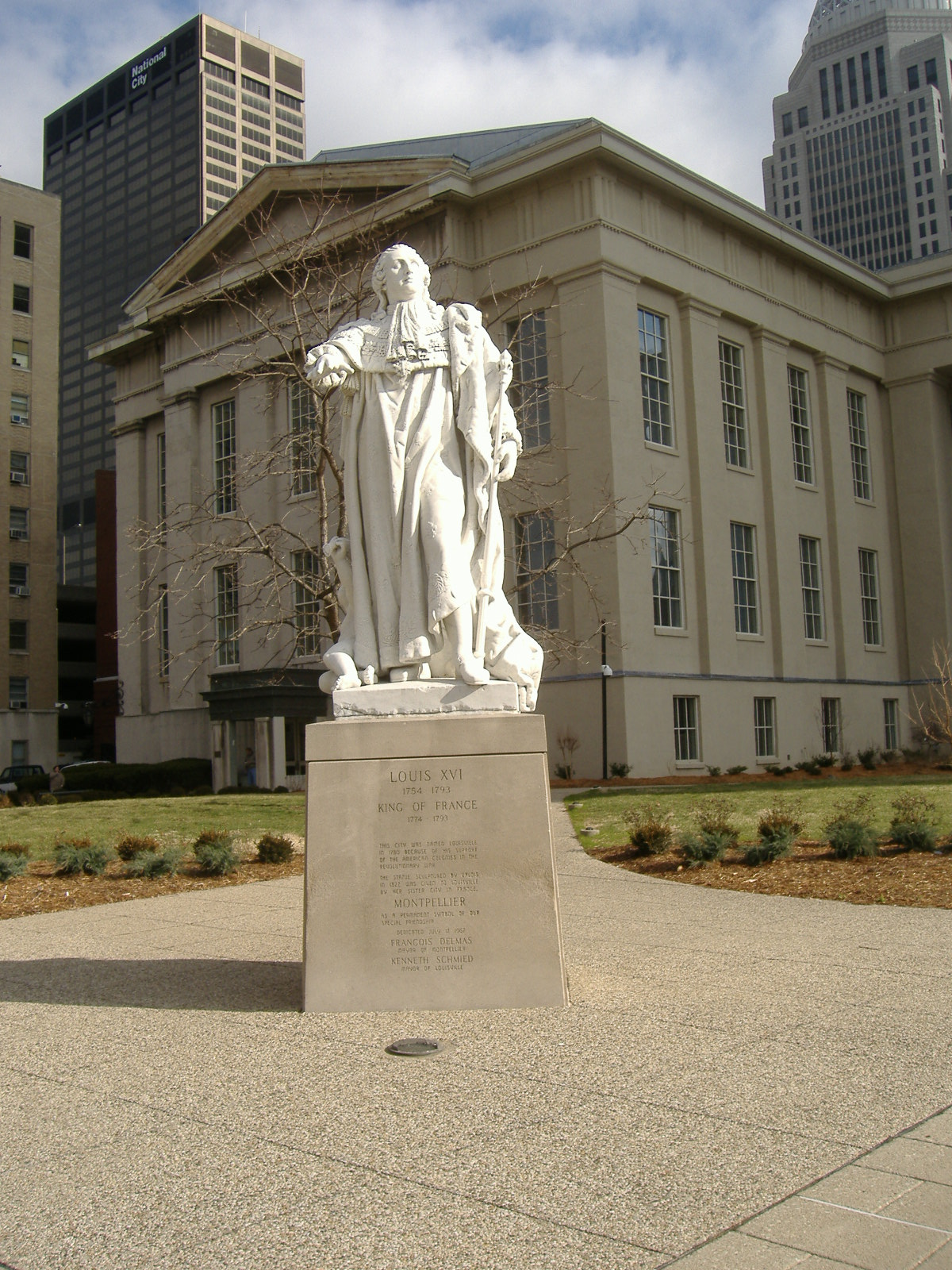
Statue of King Louis XVI given to the city of Louisville by its French sister city, Montpellier

The influence of those of French ancestry on Louisville, Kentucky, United States, and the surrounding area, especially New Albany, Indiana, began in the 18th century. The city was named for King Louis XVI.

== 18th century ==
Early French immigrants came in three phases; the first group of about 15,000 settled mostly in the coastal states. The first French settlers of Louisville were second- and third-generation American-born Huguenots. The first generation arrived in North America in 1685 after the Edict of Nantes was repealed. Their descendants were represented by such people as Thomas Bullitt, a surveyor who started Bullitt's Lick, Kentucky's oldest industry. The second significant immigration was mainly of cultural value during the American Revolution as most of the French that came from overseas during this time returned after the war.

The third migration during the French Revolution in 1793 provided a wide variety of people from nobles to clergy. Most of the groups that traveled to Kentucky settled in Louisville at the Falls of the Ohio. During this time, the French descendants and immigrants utilized Shippingport and Portland for commerce. A settler named Aaron Fontaine ran a ferry system called Fontaine Ferry that later became the namesake for Fontaine Ferry Park. In 1782, Jean A. Honoré and Bethelemi Tardiveau had a business at Shippingport in which they dealt in flour, furs and land, leading them to meet George Rogers Clark. Their business became the first exploit of the New Orleans trade.

== 19th century ==
Shippingport remained a large part of early French immigrants' lives until a flood in 1832. Portland then became the more prominent area for the French-based community after the flood. In the mid-19th century, the French commerce boomed. Frenchman James Berthoud established Kentucky's second insurance agency and chartered the first Bank of Kentucky. Berthoud's son Nicholas went on to be a charter member of the Louisville and Portland Canal.

Louisville experienced its largest impact from immigration in the period from 1830 to 1850. The majority of immigrants were of French, German, and Irish descent. The two counties that saw the most impact in the Louisville Metropolitan Statistical Area were Jefferson County, Kentucky and Floyd County, Indiana. The populations for the two counties doubled within this time period. Floyd County saw French immigrants locating in the county as early as 1817.

== Post-1900 ==
As a tribute to Louisville's connection to the French, Louisville's sister city in France, Montpellier, gave Louisville a statue of King Louis XVI of France, the namesake of Louisville, that it held in storage for years. The statue was officially presented in 1967, and still stands at the southeast street corner of Louisville Metro Hall.

French influence remains in the community via groups such as the Alliance Française de Louisville which hosts events and helps teach French.

== See also ==
- History of Louisville, Kentucky
- Missouri French
