= Brown Tobacco Warehouse =

- U.S. National Register of Historic Places
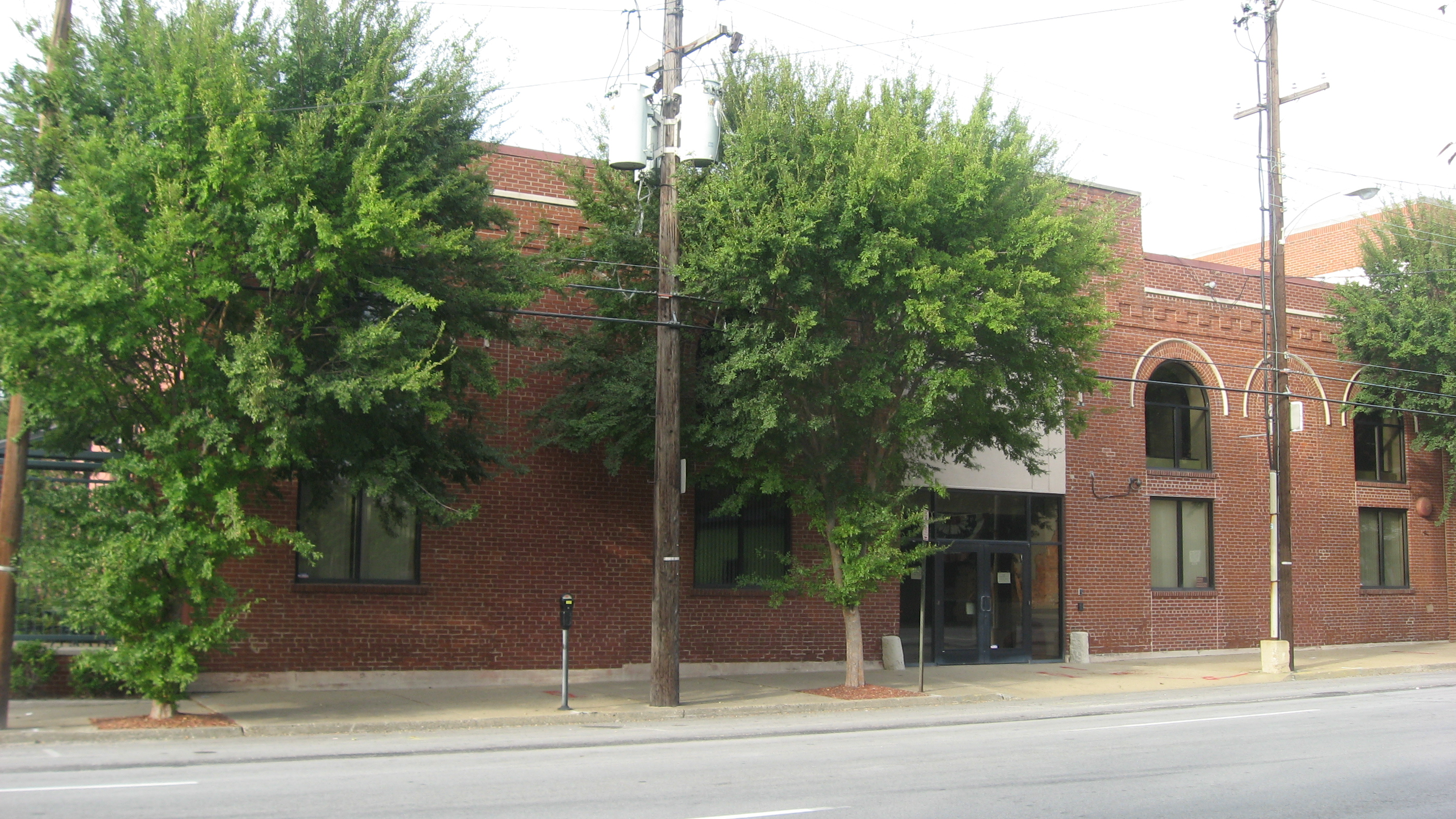
- Front of the building

- Location within Kentucky Location within the United States
- Location: 1019–25 W. Main St., Louisville, Kentucky
- Coordinates: 38°15′29″N 85°46′4″W
- Area: less than one acre
- Built: 1892
- Architectural style: Early Commercial
- MPS: West Louisville MRA
- NRHP reference No.: 83002643
- Added to NRHP: September 8, 1983

The Brown Tobacco Warehouse is a historic warehouse building located in Louisville, Kentucky. The two-story brick structure was built in 1892. It was first occupied by John W. Brown & Brothers Tobacco Company.

It was added to the National Register of Historic Places in 1983.

It has a two-story arched entrance for vehicles, with three narrower round-arched window bays on each side. The building is "representative of the architecture of the many tobacco warehouses built after the 1890 tornado."

== See also ==
- National Register of Historic Places listings in Portland, Louisville, Kentucky
