= Jim Porter (giant) =

American tavern keeper and coach driver (1811–1859)

James D. Porter, known as "Big Jim" Porter (December 15, 1811 – April 25, 1859) was an American tavern keeper and coach driver in the mid-nineteenth century, and internationally famous as the tallest man in the country. Porter stood 7 feet 8 inches tall, weighed 300 pounds, had hands 13 inches long from the wrist to the tip of the middle finger and feet that were 14 ½ inches long. Upon meeting him, Charles Dickens wrote in his 1842 travelogue American Notes and Pictures of Italy that Porter walked in a crowd as a lighthouse among lampposts.

Louisville area doctors gathered in 2006 to review Porter's medical profile. Their conclusion suggests that Porter had a hormone disorder called acromegaly, which affects about three out of every one million people. Acromegaly or gigantism results from a tumor (usually benign) pressing on the pituitary gland releasing an excessive amount of growth hormones.

== Early life ==
Born James D. Porter on December 15, 1811 in Portsmouth, Ohio, Porter moved to Shippingport, Kentucky (now a part of Louisville) with his family as an infant where his father sought work at the Tarascon Mill.

Small as a child, Porter began his career at age 14 as a jockey at the Elm Tree Garden horse track on Shippingport Island.

Porter began his rapid growth at age 17, sometimes growing as much as one inch in a week. It became customary for the town locals to place bets on his growth. Ever the good sport, Porter allowed himself to be weighed and measured every Saturday night. By age 30, Porter had reached his full height and weight.

Originally apprenticed as a cooper, Porter gave up the trade as his quickly growing limbs made him clumsy and wobbly. Switching to building hog heads of tobacco wasn't much easier, so Porter turned to driving a hackney full of cargo or passengers along the Portland & Louisville Turnpike. Witnesses say Porter's legs dangled to just a few inches off the ground looking as if there was a person on top and another person lower. To open the door of the coach he simply leaned over from his seat. According to one reminiscence of Louisville in the 1850s, "One of the things that the boys appreciated about as much as a circus was the Kentucky Giant—Jim Porter. Almost any day he could be seen driving on Main Street in his one-seat buggy, a big mule pulling it, and his knees higher than the dashboard. He always dressed in a long-tail frock coat, an old-fashioned standing collar and a high hat."

== Fame ==
Capitalizing on his unusual size, traveled the East Coast performing a play based on Gulliver's Travels. He found the traveling life uncomfortable for a man his size and returned to Shippingport vowing never to travel again. According to his niece Lily Levi, "Not a chair was tall enough, not a bed was long enough, not a table was high enough." Like any celebrity, Porter had a love-hate relationship with the public attention. At times, he was uncomfortable with the attention, yet he often traveled around town performing small skits and appearing at local events.

While exploring the United States with his wife, Charles Dickens sent word requesting an appearance by Porter aboard Dickens' steamship. Porter returned the message stating that since Dickens wanted to see him more than the other way around, then Dickens will come to him.

Upon reading Dickens' account of Porter, P. T. Barnum offered Porter a position traveling in his famous circus. Porter declined.

== Taverns ==
Porter opened his first tavern, The Lone Star, in 1836 near the Portland Canal in Louisville.

Prospering early, he built a bigger tavern on Front Street in Shippingport. The massive building was three stories tall with 18 rooms and 10-foot ceilings. The Big Gun Tavern was to be the grandest hotel in the South. Porter's tavern was built by 1848, complete with custom made furniture designed to fit his build.

Unfortunately, Porter's endeavor failed as steamboat traffic eventually gave way to the growing train traffic.

== Death ==
Porter was found dead in his bed on the morning of April 25, 1859, as a family member attempted to rouse him for breakfast. It is believed that he died of heart disease as a complication of acromegaly.

A special coffin 9 feet long and 2 feet wide at the breast was made for Porter and the rear doors had to be tied shut as the hearse lead a parade like a procession to Cave Hill Cemetery on April 28, 1859.

He was survived by his mother, by then the wife of Capt. Harrington, brother, and sister.

Ever the spectacle, visitors from around the world peered into the ornamental door of the family vault to see the contrast of Porter's casket next to the casket of normal size. The vault soon fell into disrepair and was torn down by 1900. Today only a concrete marker remains.
