= St. Patrick's Catholic Church (Louisville, Kentucky) =

Historic church in Kentucky, United States

- St. Patrick's Roman Catholic Church, Rectory, and School
- U.S. National Register of Historic Places
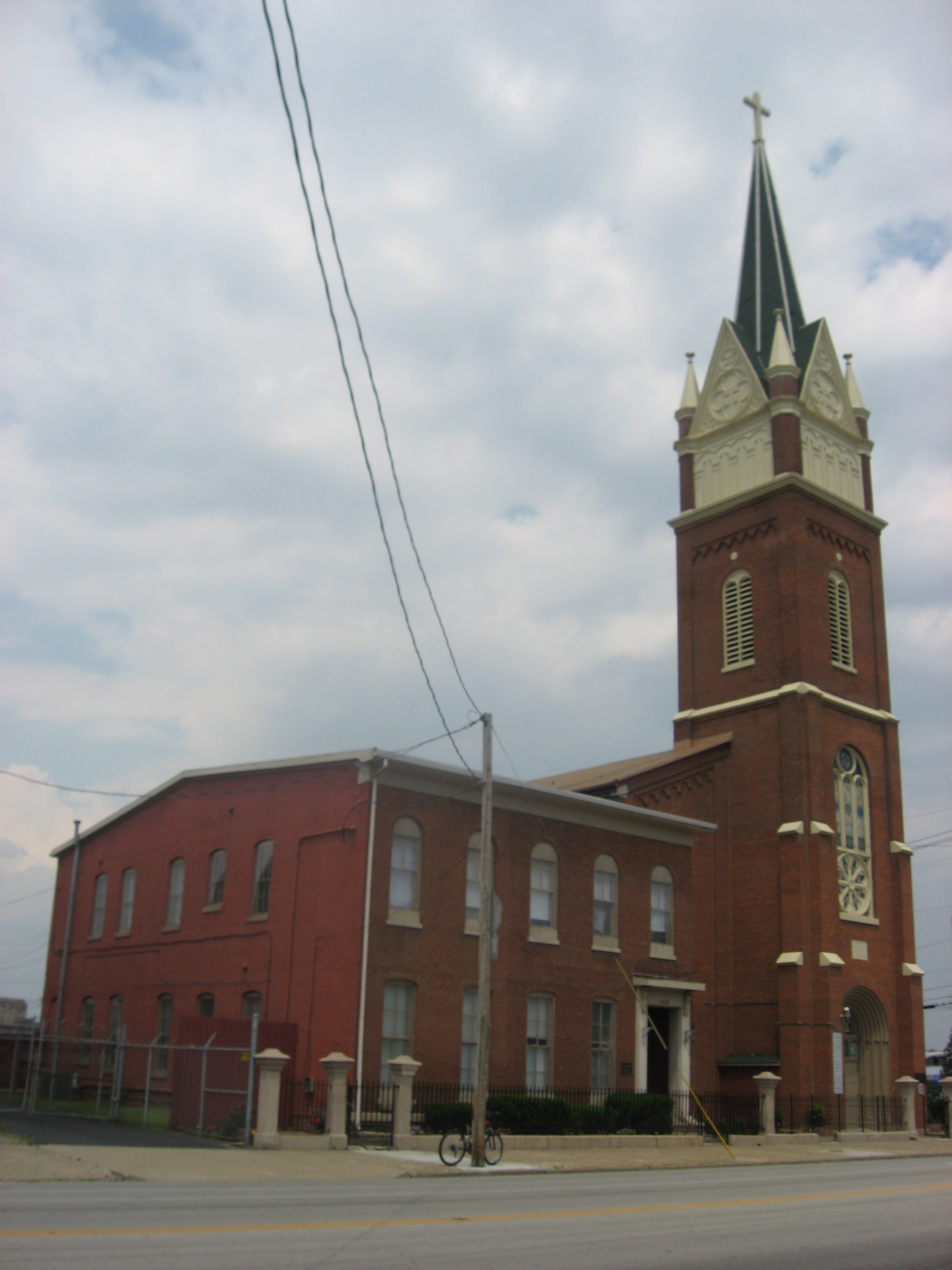
- Church with rectory in foreground

- Location within Kentucky Location within the United States
- Location: 1301-1305 West Market Street (US 31W), Louisville, Kentucky
- Coordinates: 38°15′26″N 85°46′19″W
- Area: Less than 1 acre (0.40 ha)
- Built: 1853
- Architectural style: Romanesque Revival
- NRHP reference No.: 82002723
- Added to NRHP: March 1, 1982

The former St. Patrick's Catholic Church is a historic Roman Catholic parish church located at 1301-1305 West Market Street in Louisville, Kentucky, United States. The church built in 1860 is a large 3-story steepled redbrick Romanesque Revival building, while the rectory next door is a 2-story redbrick structure. In 1991 the Roman Catholic Archdiocese of Louisville leased the building for 25 years to Dismas House Charities to be use as a rehabilitation center known as "Dismas House".On March 17, 2004, over 600 attended a the 150th celebration. The original 1854 Church and school which was situated behind the church on 13th Street were torn down without a demolition permit in June 2004 by its owner, Cardinal Insulation, shortly before the time the Xaviarian Brothers would celebrate their 150th anniversary. Despite all three structures being added March 1, 1982, to the National Register of Historic Places former parishioners were in shock and vowed to seek local Louisville Landmark status for the 1862 Church and rectory. A complete history of the church was written by Doris Batliner and published to secure the needed funds to pay for the designation. On March 17, 2006, the church became a local Louisville landmark.

Plans are underway to return the 1854 Church cornerstone to the site of its former location March 17, 2014 for the church's 160th anniversary.
