= United States Marine Hospital (Louisville, Kentucky) =

- United States Marine Hospital of Louisville
- U.S. National Register of Historic Places
- U.S. National Historic Landmark
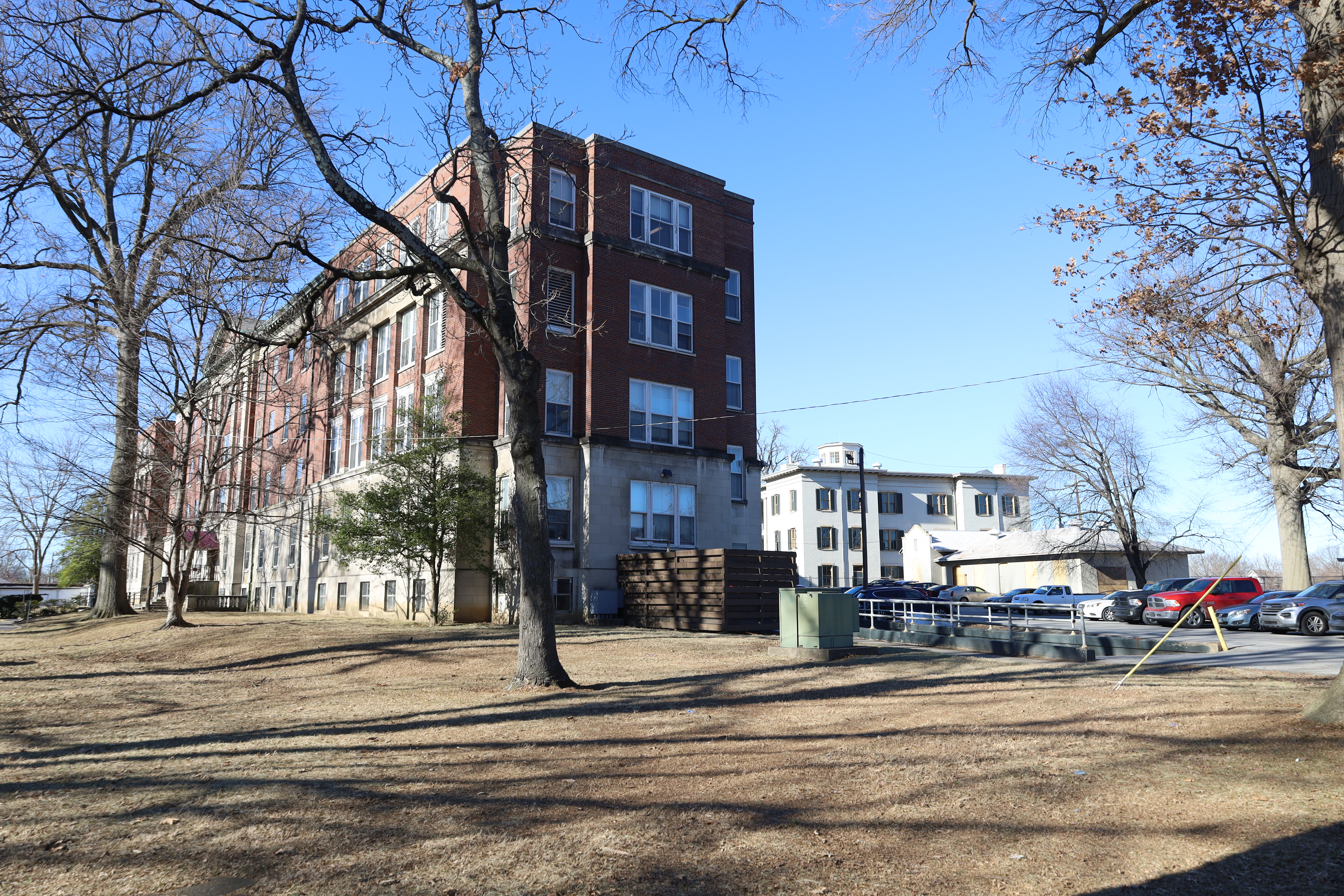
- The new (left) and original (right) main buildings of the Marine Hospital
- Location: Louisville, Kentucky, United States
- Coordinates: 38.271°N 85.78398°W
- Built: 1845
- Architect: multiple
- Architectural style: Greek Revival
- NRHP reference No.: 97001265
- Added to NRHP: September 25, 1997

The United States Marine Hospital in Louisville, Kentucky, in the Portland neighborhood was part of the U.S. Marine Hospital system, which was run by the Marine Hospital Service and its successor the Public Health Service, primarily for the benefit of the civilian merchant marine.

The campus contained two main buildings, both of which still exist. The old main building was built in 1845, and is considered by the National Park Service to be the best remaining antebellum hospital in the United States. Of the seven hospitals built in the mid-19th century by the Marine Hospital Service "for the benefit of sick seamen, boatmen, and other navigators on the western rivers and lakes", It is the only one still standing, even after surviving two tornadoes. The building's exterior has been extensively restored to match its appearance in 1899, but remains largely vacant.

The new main building was completed in 1933, and is still in use as a county-run primary care facility.

== Marine Hospital ==
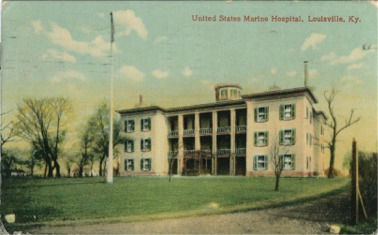
Postcard view of hospital from around 1909

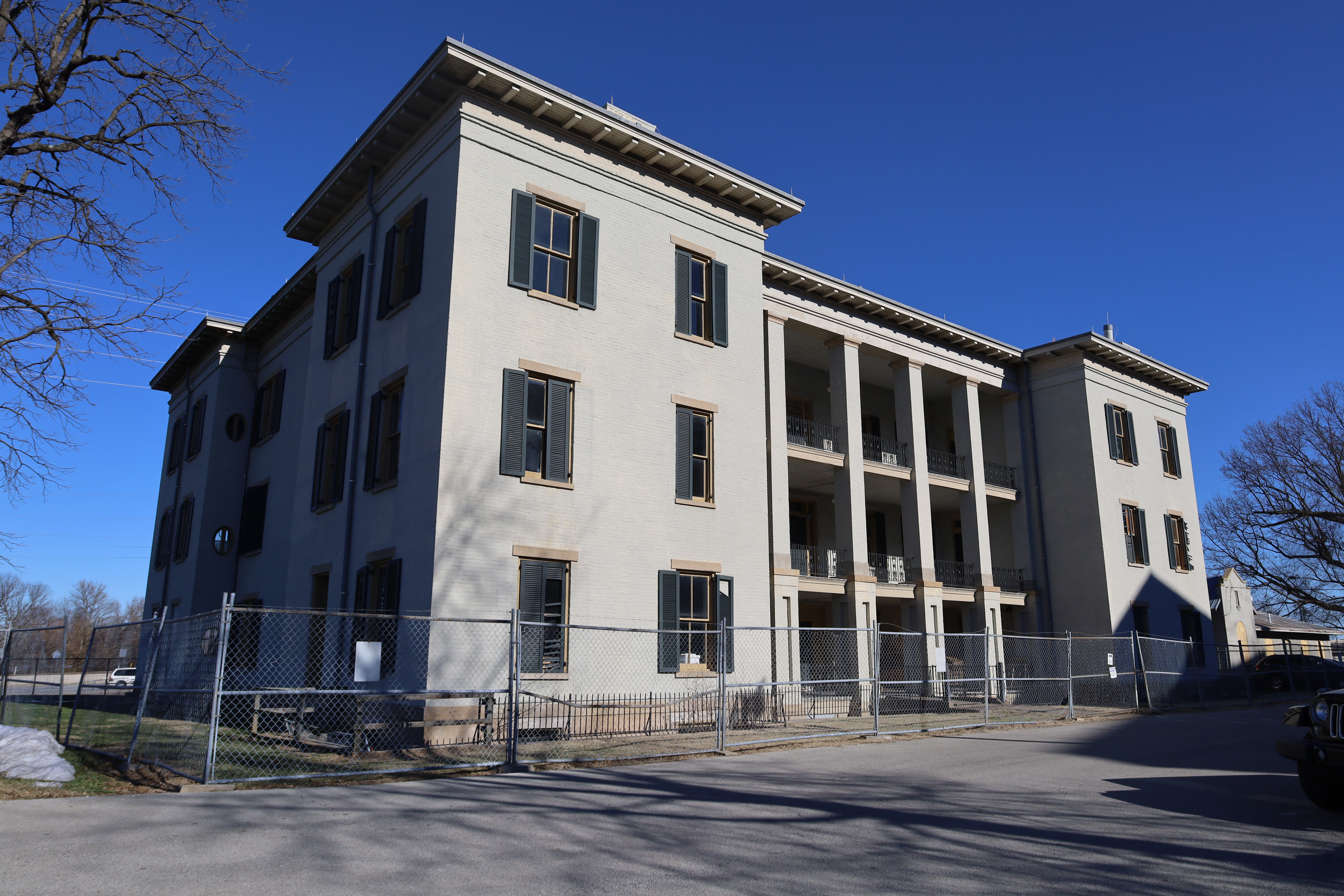
The original hospital building in 2025

The site for the hospital was selected in 1837, and the land was purchased by the federal government in 1843. Funding for the hospital was authorized by Congress in 1845 along with six other locations along the "western waters" of the Mississippi River, Ohio River, and Great Lakes. (The Louisville hospital is the only one of these still standing.) Construction paused the following year because the funds had been exhausted, but resumed in 1849 and was completed in September 1851. The U.S. Marine Hospital opened in April 1852.

It was designed by Robert Mills, who designed the Washington Monument and several other prominent structures. It is of Greek Revival architecture. The structure was strategically placed between the wharves of Louisville and Portland, with a "beneficial effect of a view of the water, and the impressions and associations it would naturally awake in the minds of men whose occupation were so intimately connected with it." It was a "cutting edge" facility, with indoor plumbing and an air circulation system that helped prevent infections.

The patients at the Louisville Marine Hospital were usually victims of disease, temperature extremes, and mechanical deficiencies of the era's naval technology. During the American Civil War, along with Jefferson General Hospital, it formed the foundation of Louisville health care for wounded soldiers, both Union and captured Confederates. It is believed that a third of the total patients were black. However, the hospital closed in 1863. It reopened in 1869 and was operated by the Sisters of Mercy as a Class II hospital.

In 1875, the U.S. government took back control under the newly organized Marine Hospital Service. A brick stable and tool shed were built on the property in 1893 or 1894, a cast-iron fence was added to the property's perimeter around 1900, and a laundry and staff quarters building was built in 1911. During this time, the remainder of the property hosted vegetable gardens, greenhouses, a tennis court.

During World War I the hospital cared for many amputees injured in the war. In 1921, 4,784 patients were treated at the hospital.

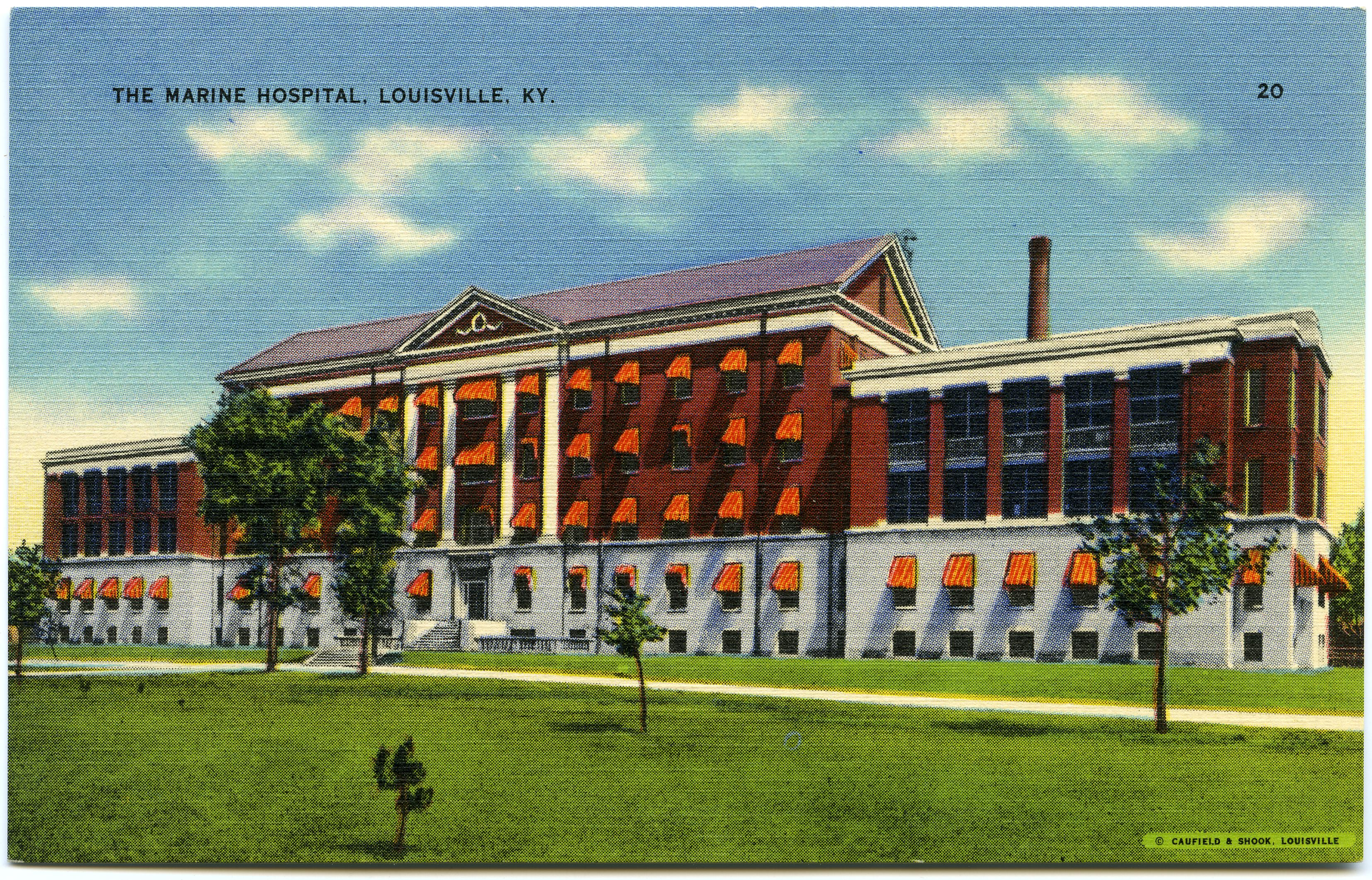
Postcard view of the new main building from the late 1930s or early 1940s

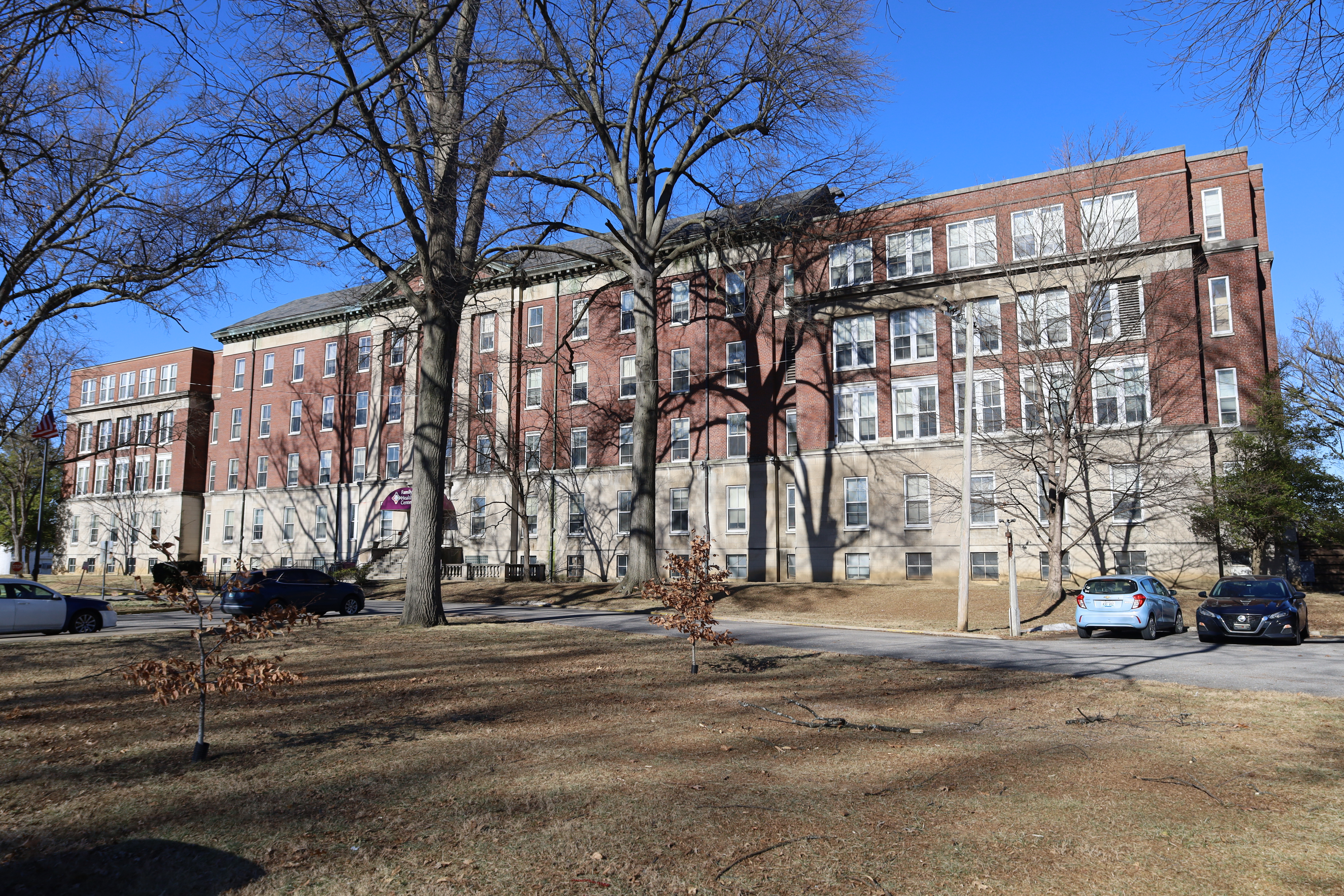
The new main building in 2025

A new building was completed in 1933. The same year, a smokestack was added to the old building as part of a heating plant that served both buildings. During the 1930s, the old building served as housing for nurses and doctors.

The Marine Hospital closed in 1947. The City of Louisville purchased the facility in 1950 for $25,000.

== Later history ==
=== New building ===
The new building reopened in 1953 as the Louisville Memorial Hospital for the chronically ill.

In 1975, the hospital was transferred to the Louisville-Jefferson County Board of Health. The next year it reopened as a primary care facility; it was first named Louisville Memorial Primary Care Center, then Family Health Centers, and currently Family Health Centers – Portland site.

The new building is listed as a non-contributing property to the historic landmark designation, mainly because was not yet 50 years old at the time the other structures were placed on the National Register of Historic Places, although it is considered eligible for listing.

=== Old building ===
The old building remained in use as office space until 1979, and was later used to store records, although it hosted a temporary museum exhibit in 1991. The old hospital building, stable, laundry building, and cast-iron fence were placed on the National Register of Historic Places in 1978, and were promoted to National Historic Landmark status in 1997.

==== Exterior restoration ====
In 2003, the National Trust for Historic Preservation (NTHP) placed the old building on its America's Most Endangered Places list, which helped spark public interest in restoring it. That year, the hospital received a $375,000 Save America's Treasures grant from the National Park Service to repair its roof and exterior.

Construction began on November 11, 2005. The hospital was returned to its appearance from around 1900. The smokestack, constructed in 1933, was demolished to help return the structure to its 1899 appearance. The octagonal cupola, which patients used to better view the passing river traffic during its heyday, was also rebuilt. Small buildings that once housed a boiler and a parking structure were razed to reflect the original design. The 28 sets of wrought iron railings lining the building's galleries were either restored or replaced by the same Covington, Kentucky-based iron works company that created the original ones in 1850.

The restoration cost $2.5 million. The hospital celebrated the completion of its exterior restoration phase with an open house on June 16, 2007.

==== Subsequent events ====
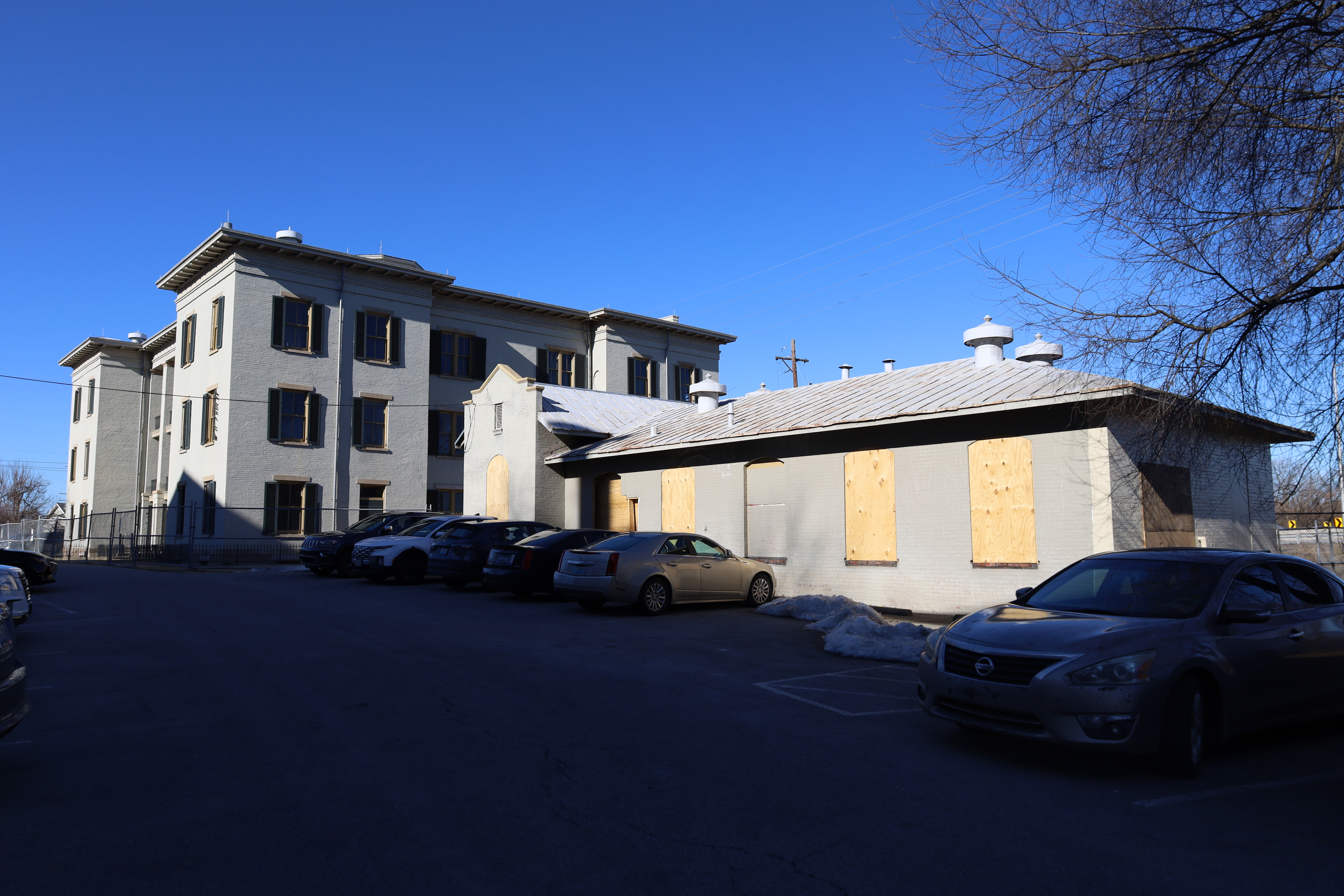
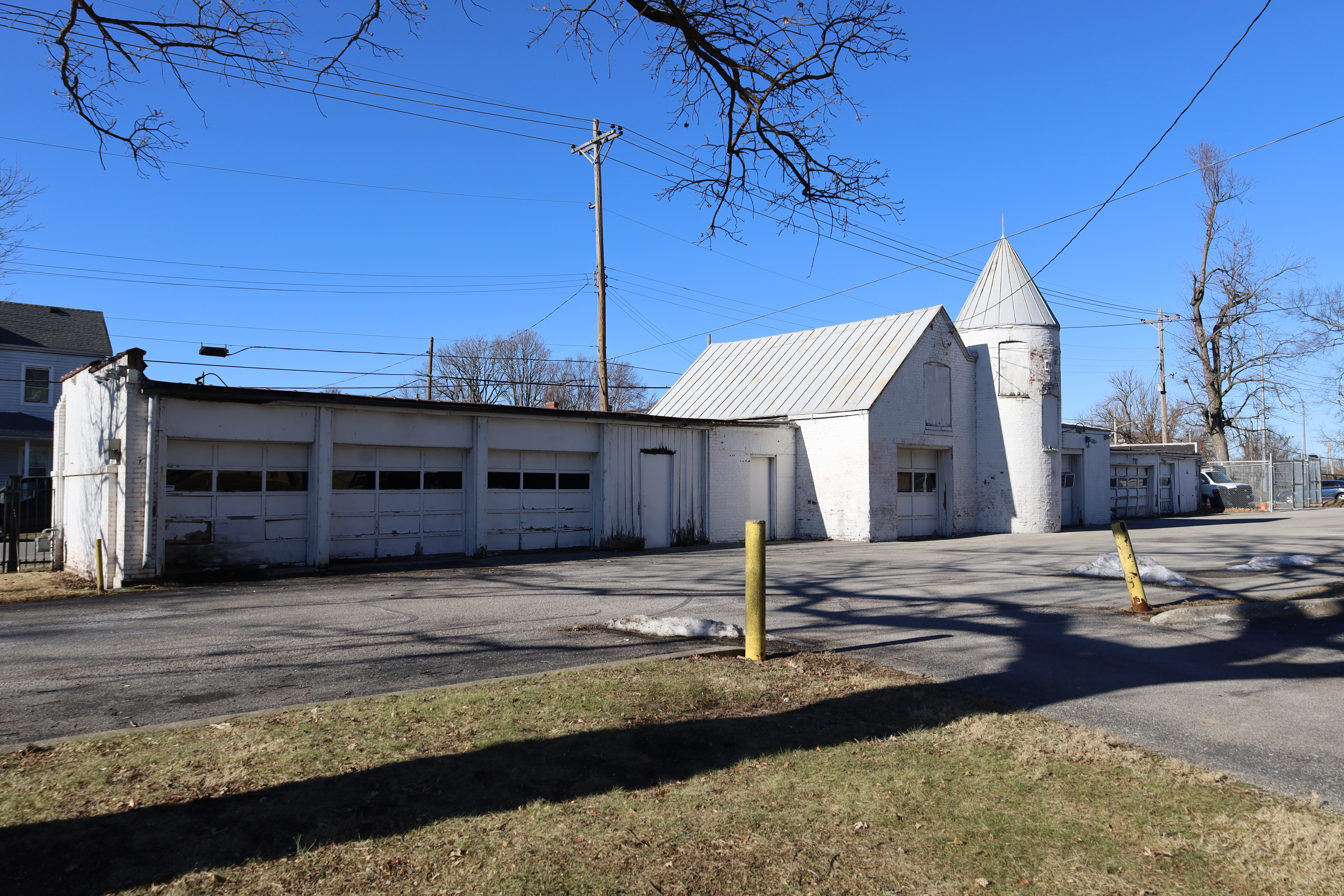
Two historic outbuildings exist on the site: the former laundry (top) and stable (bottom)

Several plans have been devised to use the structure. During Paul E. Patton's term as Kentucky governor during 1995–2003, the hospital was considered as a welcome center for those entering Kentucky from the Sherman Minton Bridge. High traffic projections stopped that plan from being implemented.

In 2007, the basement, which formerly held boilers, was proposed to be used as a 3,450-square-foot (321 m^{2}) multi-use ballroom and rented out for parties and other special events, and the building's ground floor as an interactive center featuring hospital history and artifacts. The remaining two floors were proposed for agencies and organizations specializing in improving community health within underserved urban communities. Also in 2007, discussions were held with the University of Louisville about placing a Community Health Center in the historic building.

However, efforts to raise money to renovate the interior of the building remained unsuccessful as late as 2018, although the first floor was in use as a meeting space.

== See also ==
- Louisville in the American Civil War
- List of attractions and events in the Louisville metropolitan area
