= Squire Earick House =

Historic house in Kentucky, United States

- U.S. Historic district – Contributing property
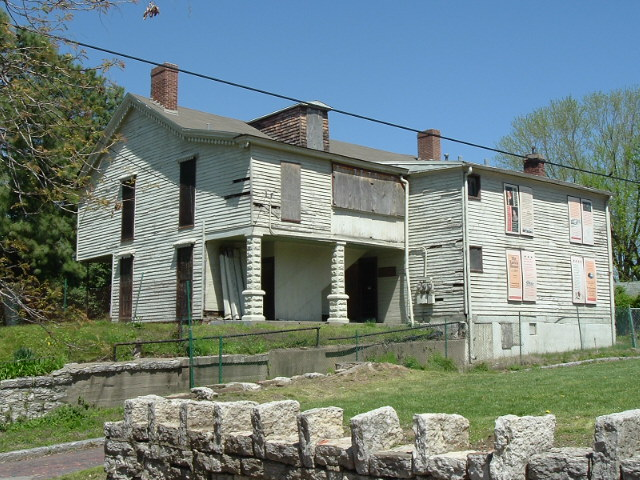
- Completed in 1812, the Squire Earick House is the oldest known wood-frame structure in Louisville

- Location within Kentucky Location within the United States
- Location: 719 North 34th Street, Louisville, Kentucky. Roughly bounded by Missouri Alley, Pflanz Ave., Bank, N. 33rd and N. 37th Sts., Louisville, Kentucky
- Coordinates: 38.27567°N 85.80247°W
- Built: 1812
- Part of: Portland Historic District (ID80001615)
- Added to NRHP: February 21, 1980

The Squire Earick House is the oldest known wood-frame house in Louisville, Kentucky, United States, built in 1812 in the Portland area of the city, which was then a town all its own. It has had many owners and a complicated history.

== History ==
David Shields and his brother-in-law purchased the house in 1827. Shields was a trader and pilot on the Ohio River, taking flatboats loaded with pork, flour, and whiskey to New Orleans from Portland. In 1831 he ran into financial difficulties that eventually bankrupted him in 1843. He and his family continued to live in the Earick House until about 1843 when a brother-in-law, Squire Jacob Wilstach Earick, purchased the house. Earick remodeled parts of the house with Victorian upgrades and lived there with his large family until his death. The Portland Museum owns two charcoal portraits and two oil portraits by naturalist John James Audubon. The charcoal drawings represent Mary Ann Bell who became Mrs. Jacob Earick and her mother Jane McLean Bell. The oil paintings represent Jacob Earick and Mary Ann Bell Earick.

The Portland Development Organization donated the Earick House to the Portland Museum in 1994. It is currently undergoing renovation. With limited funding available, there is not a final finish date.

== Building style ==
The Earick House was built by timber framing, where heavy timber are jointed together with pegged mortise and tenon joints. The structure was originally built in the Federal architectural style. Once Squire Earick took possession of the home, he renovated with many characteristics of Steamboat Gothic style.
