= Portland Museum (Louisville) =

Art and history museum in Kentucky

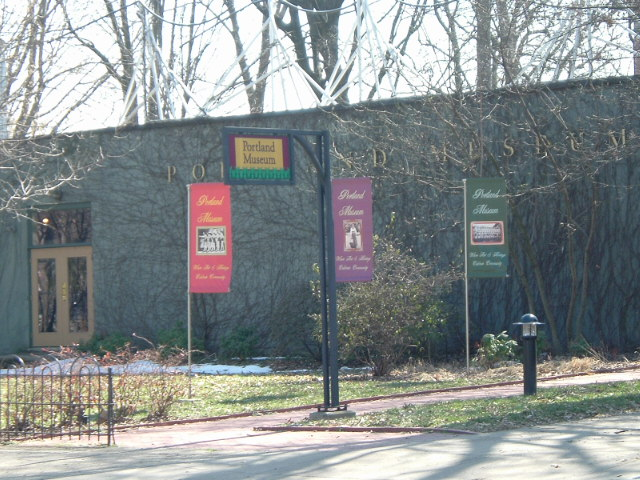
- Portland Museum in 2008
- Established: 1978
- Location: 2308 Portland Avenue; Louisville, Kentucky 40212
- Coordinates: 38°16′09.7″N 85°47′11.3″W
- Type: History, Art
- Website: portlandky.org

The Portland Museum is a neighborhood history and art museum in Louisville, Kentucky. It details the history of the Portland neighborhood both as an independent town in the early 1800s and after Portland's amalgamation into Louisville after the construction of the Louisville and Portland Canal.

The museum consists of three buildings: Beech Grove, a 19th-century Italianate mansion, the former Portland Bridge Baptist Mission Building, connected at Beech Grove's north side, and the AHOY House, a renovated Victorian property adjacent to the museum. The museum is also working to restore the 1812 Squire Earick House.

== History ==
The museum was originally founded by seven teachers from the old Roosevelt Elementary School with an initial grant the National Endowment for the Humanities. The collection originally consisted of scrapbooks from various local families but has now since been expanded since then to include various artifacts, paintings and other memorabilia from local residents. Upon the school's closing in 1980, the museum was moved to the Brown School before settling into its current facility in 1983.

== Exhibits ==
The museum contains exhibits on famous residents of Portland, including an exhibit of paintings by John James Audubon. In 2014, the museum opened a permanent collection consisting of memorabilia donated by former football star Paul Hornung . The museum also features a book printing room for students.

As part of a recent revitalization effort in the Portland neighborhood, the museum acquired an adjacent Victorian home in 2020 and has since begun developing it into an immersive space and play area for children called AHOY. Danny Seim of the indie rock group Menomena was appointed as a co-director of the museum in 2019 and is now the executive director of the AHOY project.

== See also ==
- List of attractions and events in the Louisville metropolitan area
- List of museums in the Louisville metropolitan area
