= Shippingport, Kentucky =

Coordinates: 38.27510°N 85.77860°W

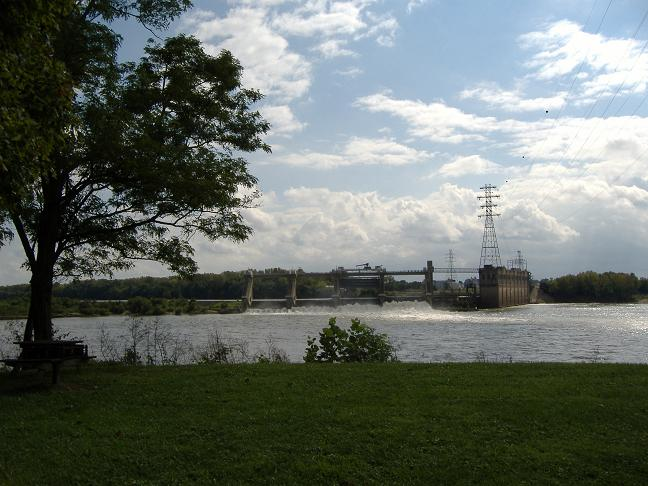
Shippingport as it looks today

Shippingport, Kentucky is an industrial site and one of the six formerly independent settlements at the Falls of the Ohio in what is now Louisville, Kentucky. It was located on a peninsula on the south bank of the Ohio River, and incorporated without a name on October 10, 1785. It was later named Campbell Town after Revolutionary War soldier and settler John Campbell. He had been granted the land for his earlier service in the French & Indian War.

In 1803 the settlement was sold to a Philadelphia-based partnership and renamed Shippingport. Two Tarascon brothers became leaders of the French business community at the Falls, building a large warehouse, a 1200-foot rope walk, and a six-story water-powered flour mill at the site by 1819. Numerous French families settled in the area, making it a center of French culture for a time. Some of the French settlers came from Kaskaskia, Illinois, and other areas of French settlement along the Mississippi River after the United States completed the Louisiana Purchase in 1803. Others were fleeing the French Revolution and its violence and political chaos, or social unrest in French colonies in the Caribbean. In 1804 former slaves succeeded in gaining independence for Haiti (formerly the French colony of Saint-Domingue) after years of warfare and violence.

Among the early streets was Tarascon, named for the two French brothers who built up early development; and Bengal, perhaps named for a French settler and schoolteacher who came from Bengal via Calcutta and had first settled in Paris, Kentucky. From 1810 to 1820 the population increased 500%, from 98 to over 500, and this seriously challenged Louisville as Kentucky's most important port. Other early features included Elm Tree Garden, where there was horse-racing, and the Napoleon Distillery. The Tarascons' six-story flour mill built in 1817 became a symbol of Shippingport's success.

Though the town frequently flooded, Shippingport reached its peak in the 1820s with a population of 600. In 1825, construction of the Louisville and Portland Canal across the peninsula left the settlement on an island. Using the canal, ships could bypass the Falls and, by extension, Shippingport.

Shippingport was hard hit by the loss of its traditional business. In 1828, Louisville incorporated as a city and included Shippingport in its boundaries. But a bad flood in 1832 was the reason most of the French community moved to Portland, now also part of Louisville (it was then northwest of the larger city). The introduction to the Louisville Directory of 1844 expressed lingering negative public sentiment toward the canal: "The Louisville and Portland Canal, as constructed and maintained, is precisely one of those improvements for private interests, at the expense of the public good, which is obnoxious to the good of the whole community".

The remnants of the settlement dwindled over the next century as the canal was gradually widened and a hydroelectric plant was built on the island. Most of the remaining families were forced to leave after the devastating Ohio River flood of 1937, which swamped this area. About 20 years later, the federal government condemned the remaining private property in 1958 to widen the canal, evicting the last families, some of whom had roots there for more than a century.

== See also ==
- Fort-on-Shore
- Fort Nelson (Kentucky)
- Geography of Louisville, Kentucky
- History of Louisville, Kentucky
- History of the French in Louisville
- Jim Porter (giant)
- Portland, Louisville
