= Montgomery Street School =

- U.S. National Register of Historic Places
- 1871 wood engraving of the school
- Location: Louisville, Kentucky
- Coordinates: 38°16′18″N 85°47′19″W
- Built: 1852
- Architect: Zeigler & Seaman
- Architectural style: Renaissance Revival
- NRHP reference No.: 82002713
- Added to NRHP: May 6, 1982

The Montgomery Street School, also known as the Emma Dolfinger School and located at 2500-2506 Montgomery Street, Louisville, Kentucky, is listed on the National Register of Historic Places.

Built in 1852, and once used as a Civil War hospital, it has been a school since 1869. It has since been expanded and renovated.

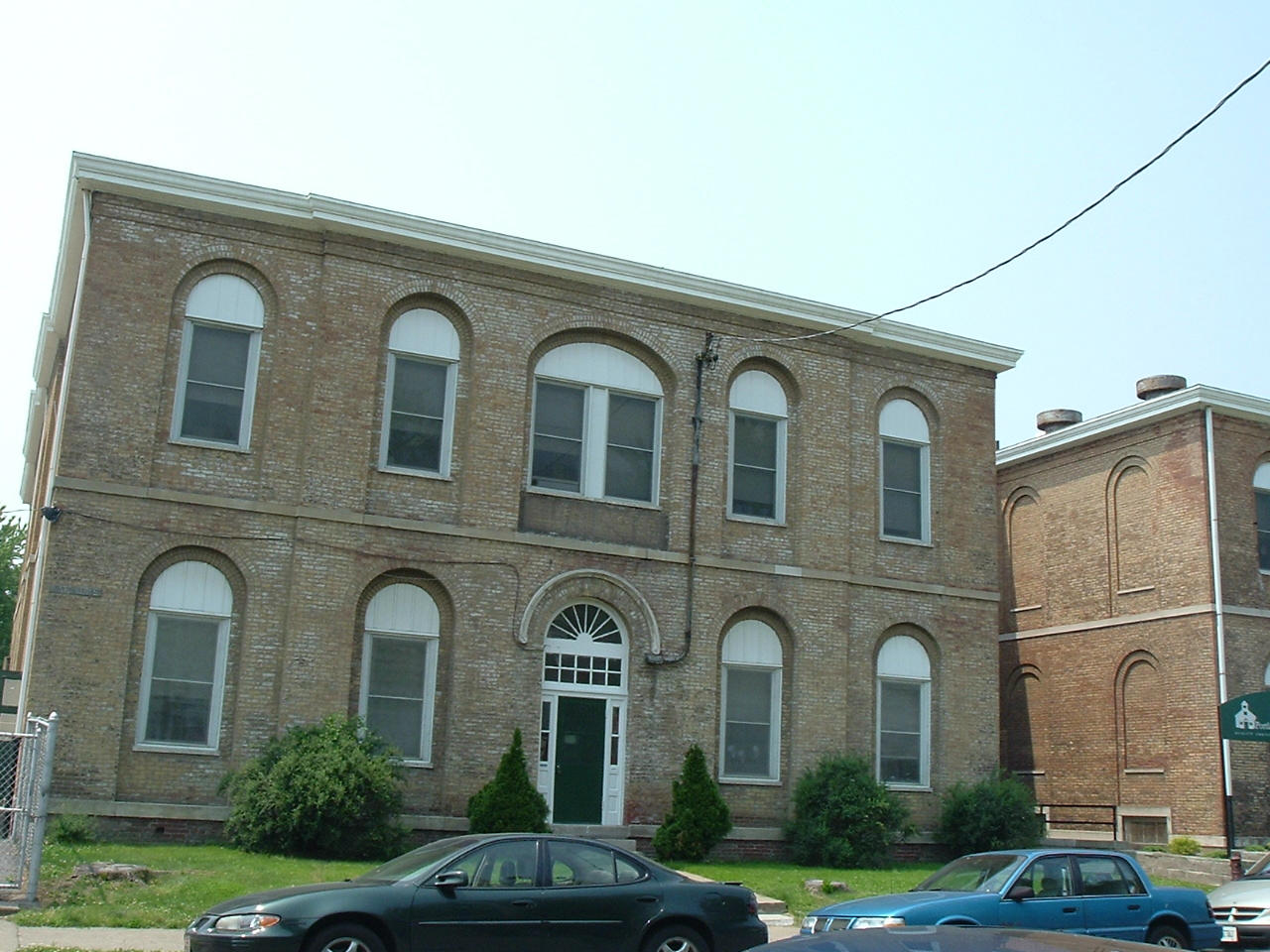
The Montgomery Street School in 2007

It was formerly the Emma Dolfinger School, a public elementary school. Until 2008, the building was used by Portland Christian School as an elementary school, but Portland Christian has since consolidated the elementary school into its Portland Ave. campus one block to the south.

Today, the building is known as "the Dolfinger", and houses offices and artist studios. This development is part of the efforts of the Portland Investment Initiative.
