= Portland, Louisville =

Neighborhood in Louisville, Kentucky

Coordinates: 38.26920°N 85.81080°W

- Portland Historic District
- U.S. National Register of Historic Places
- U.S. Historic district
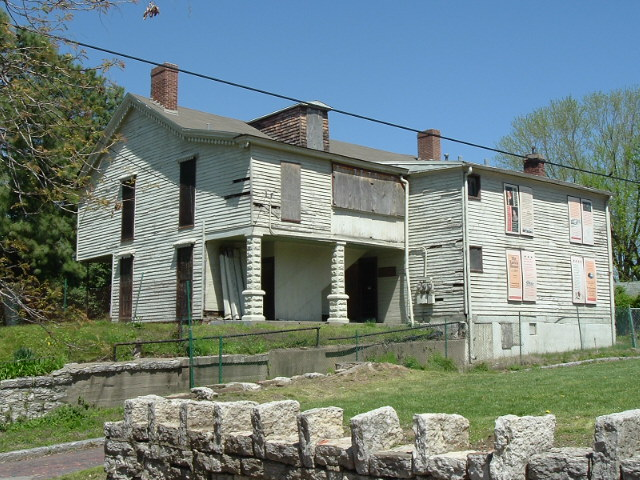
- Completed in 1812, the Squire Earick House in the Portland neighborhood is the oldest known wood-framed structure in Louisville.

- Location within Kentucky Location within the United States
- Location: Louisville, Kentucky
- Website: portlandlouisville.com
- NRHP reference No.: 80001615 (original); 100012869 (increase)

Significant dates
- Added to NRHP: February 21, 1980
- Boundary increase: April 30, 2026

Portland is a historic district, neighborhood and former independent town northwest of downtown Louisville, Kentucky. It is situated along a bend of the Ohio River just below the Falls of the Ohio National Wildlife Conservation Area, where the river curves to the north and then to the south, thus placing Portland at the northern tip of urban Louisville. In its early days it was the largest of the six major settlements at the falls, the others being Shippingport and Louisville in Kentucky and New Albany, Clarksville, and Jeffersonville on the Indiana side. Its modern boundaries are the Ohio River along the northwest, north, and northeast, 10th Street at the far east, Market Street on the south, and the Shawnee Golf Course at the far west.

== History ==
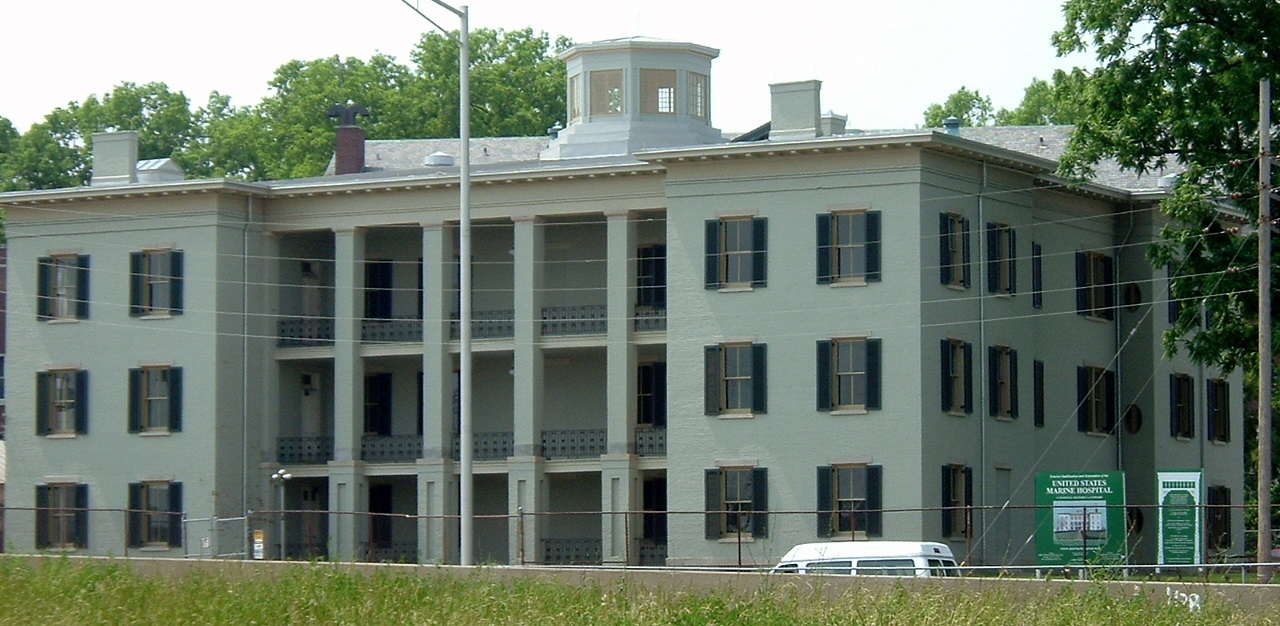
The United States Marine Hospital of Louisville is considered the best remaining antebellum hospital in the United States.

Gen. William Lytle II, the founder of Cincinnati, Ohio, owned a large amount of land just below the Falls of the Ohio and in 1811 laid out the settlement of Portland. He planned to sell the lots to finance his plan to build a canal around the Falls. Lytle authorized Joshua Barclay and Alexander Ralston to design the town, which featured a Northeast to Southwest street grid. The original settlement was between what is now 36th and 33rd Street along the Ohio River, which included a large wharf. The settlement quickly grew to the east in a Northwest to Southeast street grid, which noticeably contrasts to the east–west grid of adjacent areas of Louisville.

The advent of steamboats on the Mississippi occurred simultaneously with Portland's development, allowing the Ohio River to be used as a major freight shipping route in what was then the American Frontier. Portland was located just downstream from the only natural obstacle on the Ohio River, so all large boats traveling on the Ohio had to stop to move their freight by land around the Falls and reload them on another boat. With a captive audience and a need for freight hauling, Portland's Wharf flourished as numerous taverns, warehouses, and shipyards were built. By 1814 French immigrants from Alsace began populating the town.

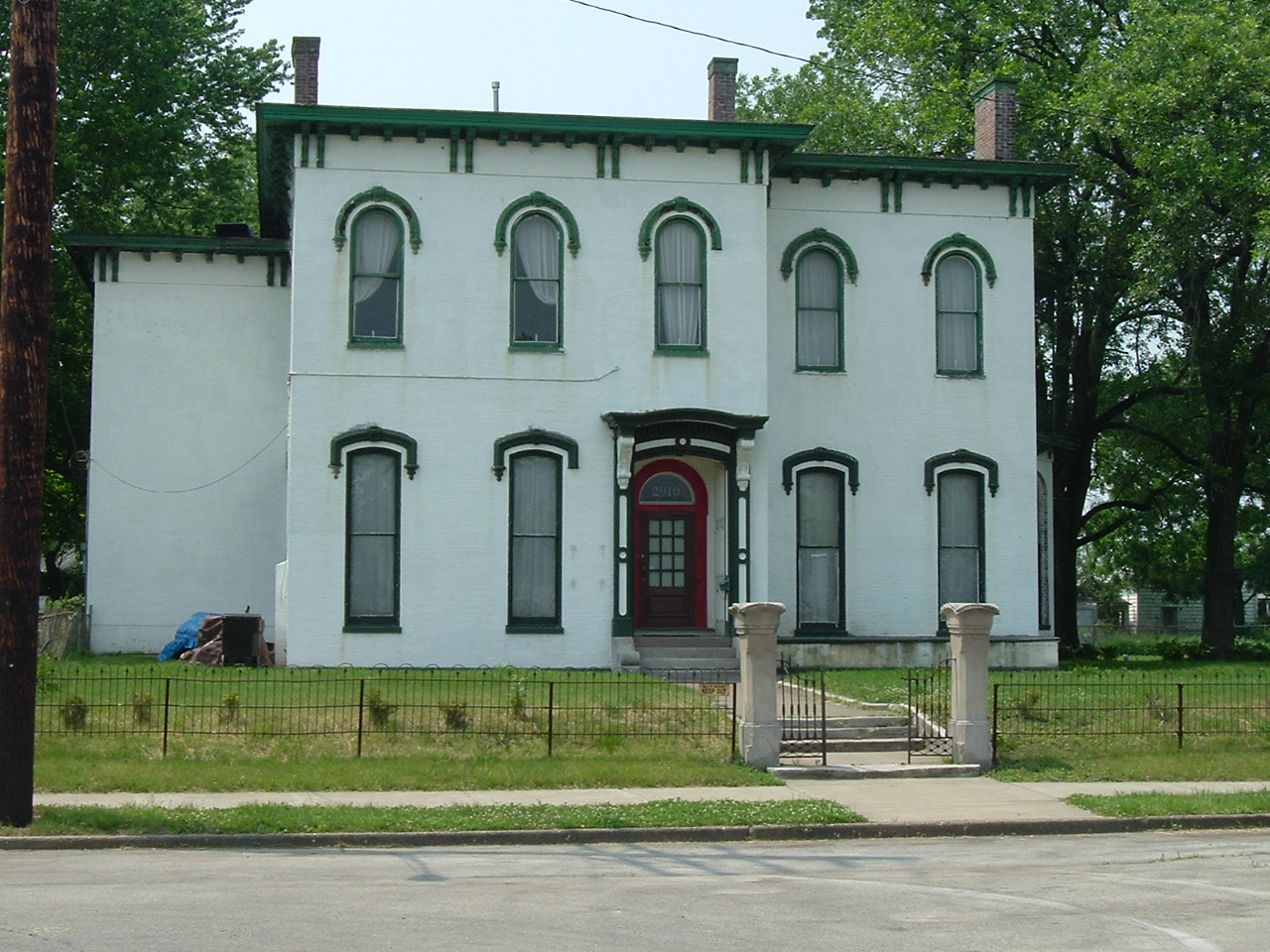
An 1863 mansion built for Enoch Lockhart, the first superintendent of the Louisville and Portland Canal. It was later used at the corporate offices of the Ky. & Ind. Terminal Railroad Co.

By 1817 the original street grid had run out of room and was expanded to 40th Street on the west and 13th Street on the east in 1817 to facilitate the additional growth. It quickly became a rival of Louisville and the nearer-by settlement of Shippingport. The three were first connected by road in 1818. This road, initially called the Louisville & Portland Turnpike, became Portland Avenue.

An important early home was the Squire Earick house (719 N. 34th Street), which was home of the first magistrate, and also used as the settlement's courthouse and jail. Another landmark was the Church of Our Lady now Good Shepherd Catholic Church, started in 1839 and the third building, built in 1873, still standing in 2010.

From 1826 to 1833, the Louisville and Portland Canal was built around the Falls, causing many of the warehouses and shipyards to close and shifting economic power on the Falls to nearby Louisville, although Portland would continue to grow as many French and Irish immigrants moved there. (The demonym "Hoosier" given to residents of Indiana since the early 1830s has been linked to the construction of the canal, allegedly because a contractor named Samuel Hoosier preferred Indiana workers over those from Kentucky, and they were therefore dubbed as "Hoosier's Men.") It was incorporated in 1834, but then annexed by Louisville in 1837 after a compromise by which the canal would be widened to handle larger ships but the new rail line going from Lexington to the Ohio River would go to Portland's wharf instead of Louisville's. However, after the new line collapsed into bankruptcy in 1840 having only reached as far as Louisville, Portlanders voted in 1842 to become independent again, although ten years later the area was annexed a second time.

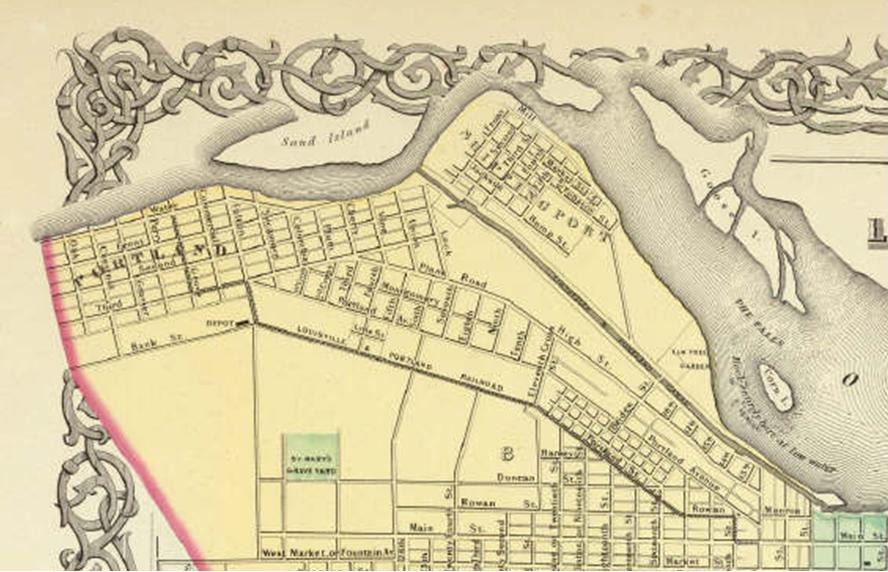
The original route of the Louisville and Portland Canal, prior to widenings in 1872, 1928, 1962, and 2008.

Although now just a neighborhood of the much larger Louisville, Portland would continue to flourish as a working class community through the 1930s, with residents working in many of the nearby factories. The largest Ohio River flood in recorded history occurred in 1937 and inundated all of Portland, with areas closest to the river nearly being wiped out. Plans began immediately to protect the area with a flood wall, but World War II occupied the priority of the government's engineers. Just eight years later in 1945 the second-largest flood in Louisville's history occurred. In its aftermath all areas of Portland nearest to the river were razed, including the Portland Wharf, and a gigantic flood wall was built to a height three feet above the level of the 1937 flood. Both floods had driven many middle-class families from the area. Despite the loss of many of area's oldest buildings, portions of the neighborhood away from the flood wall were largely untouched by urban renewal, and retain a great number of pre-Civil War buildings. Although many older mansions exist in Portland, the vast majority of homes built in the area were shotgun houses.

== Portland today ==
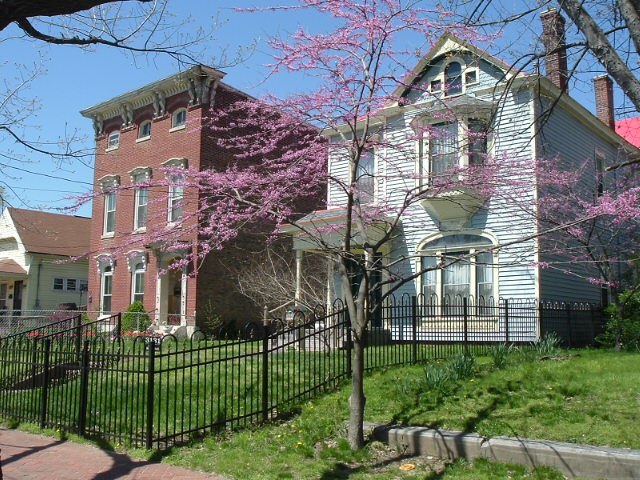
Historic homes on Northwestern Parkway

As of 2015, the estimated population of Portland is 11,810. Portland has historically been home to a diverse population, including one of the earliest settlements of free, property-holding black people who co-existed as 10–15% of Portland's resident population (according to Louisville historian Rick Bell). Archives of this community are part of the collection at Portland Museum, (2308 Portland Ave), though the museum is undergoing a massive effort to make these resources readily available to the public. Changes over time in the neighborhood are largely attributed to white flight and the devastating Ohio River floods of 1937 and 1945.

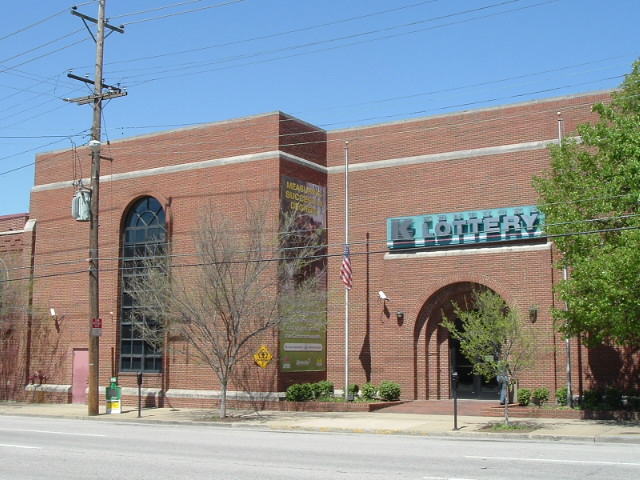
The Kentucky Lottery Headquarters in Portland

In 2006, Portland was named by First Lady Laura Bush to be a Preserve America community. Communities designated through the program are allowed to use the Preserve America logo on signs and promotional materials and are eligible to apply for grants that will be administered by the U.S. Department of the Interior.

There are several futures plans to help revive parts of Portland, including the creation of a museum and arts district in the Portland Warehouse District (which sits just 2 blocks from Louisville's Museum Row), and opening several historic buildings to the public. There are also plans for the creation of several large parks along the Portland Waterfront. When complete, the Portland Wharf Park will bear a striking resemblance to Downtown Louisville's Waterfront Park. There are also plans to great a "Great Lawn West" just west of the 9th Street/I-64 interchange.

== Attractions and historic sites ==
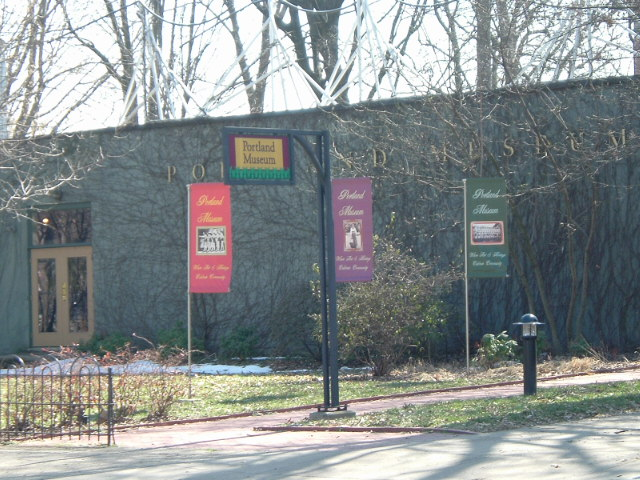
The Portland Museum details the area's history

Portland is home to a large number of Louisville's most prominent historic landmarks and a large percent of the city's pre Civil War buildings. Although currently not open to the public, the United States Marine Hospital of Louisville is considered one of the most architecturally important historic sites in the US. Completed in 1847, it is widely considered the best remaining antebellum-era hospital in the US and is the only remaining of the seven original hospitals built in the mid-19th century by the Marine Hospital Service. After sitting abandoned for several decades, the building's exterior has been fully restored to match its appearance in 1899, with the inside still being restored.

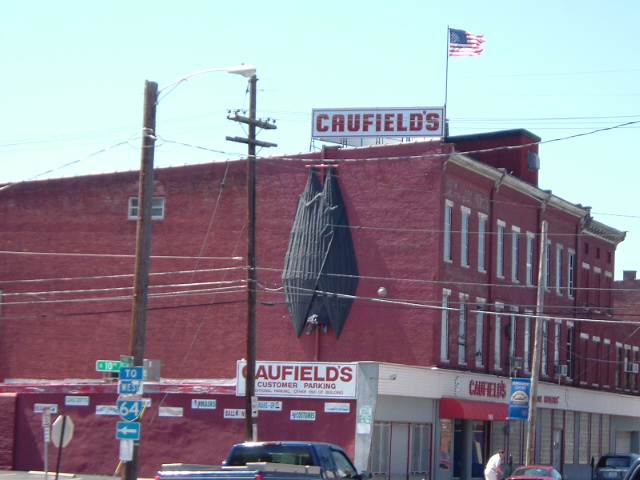
Portland is also home to the world's largest 'bat'.

There are many other 19th-century landmarks in Portland, including the Notre Dame du Port Church (1841) (now Good Shepherd Church), the Montgomery Street School (1852), and numerous privately owned mansion houses, many of which were built by steamboat captains. The entire Portland Historic District is listed on the National Register of Historic Places. In 1996 Louisville's first bike trail was opened along Portland's waterfront. The seven mile long River Walk has since been extended 20 miles to the Farnsley Morman Landing near Valley Station and is going to be part of a 110 mi (180 km) long bike trail encircling Louisville. The River Walk also links Portland directly to Downtown Louisville and Shawnee Park. The Portland Library serves the neighborhood area.

In an attempt to revitalize the community, the Table, a pay-what-you-can restaurant, was started November 2015. The Table since then has exploded and was featured on Food Network's Diners, Drive-Ins and Dives show. The Table has provided gourmet, nourishing food for homeless people and encourages working instead of handouts.

== Demographics ==
As of 2000, the population of Portland was 11,811, of which 71.7% are white, 24.5% are black, 3.1% are listed as other, and 0.8% are Hispanic. College graduates are 3.3%, people without a high school degree are 46.3%. Females are 51.9% of the population, males are 48.1%. Households making less than $15,000 a year are 38.7%.

Originally settled by French and Irish immigrants, since WWII most of the original immigrant families left for the South End of Louisville, and Portland is now mostly populated by displaced rural Kentuckians of British Isles heritage. In 2000 less than 1% of Portlanders claimed French ancestry and only 10% claimed Irish ancestry. Over 20% of Portlanders claimed 'American' ancestry, which is the most common ancestry in the rural South.

== Education ==
Portland has a lending library, a branch of the Louisville Free Public Library.

== Notable natives ==
Portland has been home to many notable people over the years:

- John James Audubon – world-renowned wildlife artist
- Paul Hornung – former Heisman Trophy winner at Notre Dame and Hall of Fame Green Bay Packers football player
- Mary Millicent Miller – first woman to be a licensed steamboat captain
- Pee Wee Reese – Baseball Hall of Famer
- Martha Rofheart née Jones – Actress and writer grew up at 2120 Portland in the 1920s
- Howard Schnellenberger – college football coach at Oklahoma, Miami, Louisville, and Florida Atlantic
- Colonel Charles Young – First African American promoted to rank of Colonel in the US Army and member of the Portland Baptist Church at 2718 Lytle Street

== Gallery ==
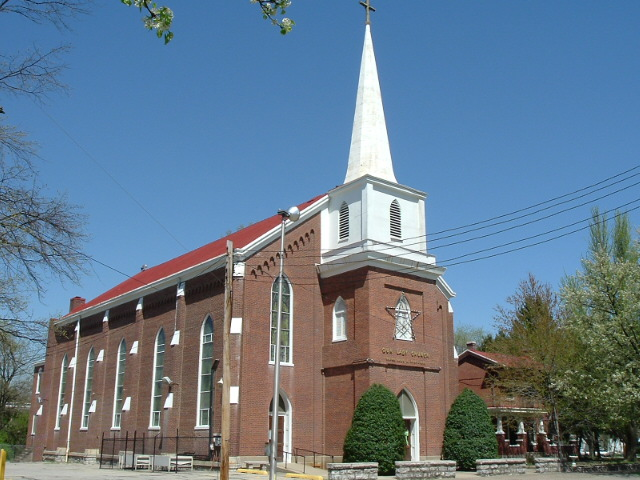
The Church of Our Lady, completed in 1873

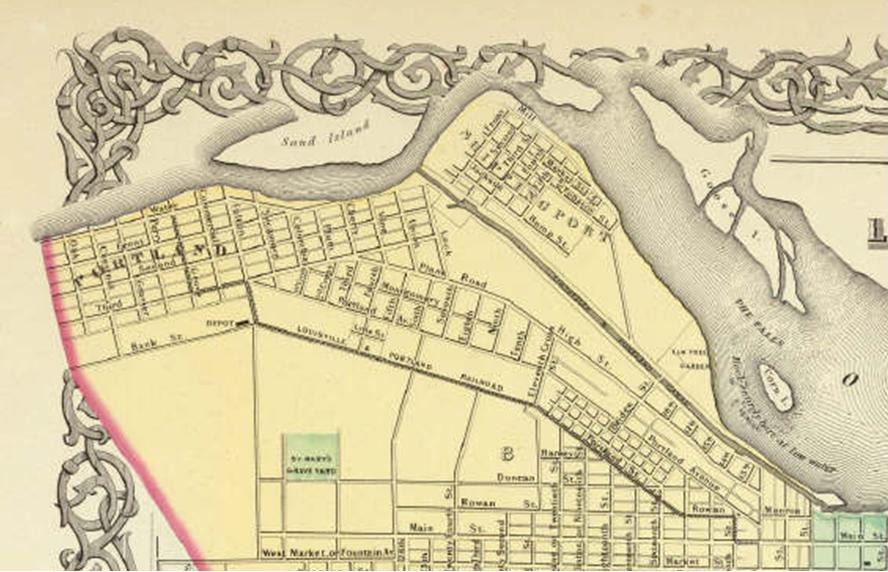
A map from the 1850s showing the streets of Portland, the slanted orientation is noticeably different than that of encroaching Louisville's

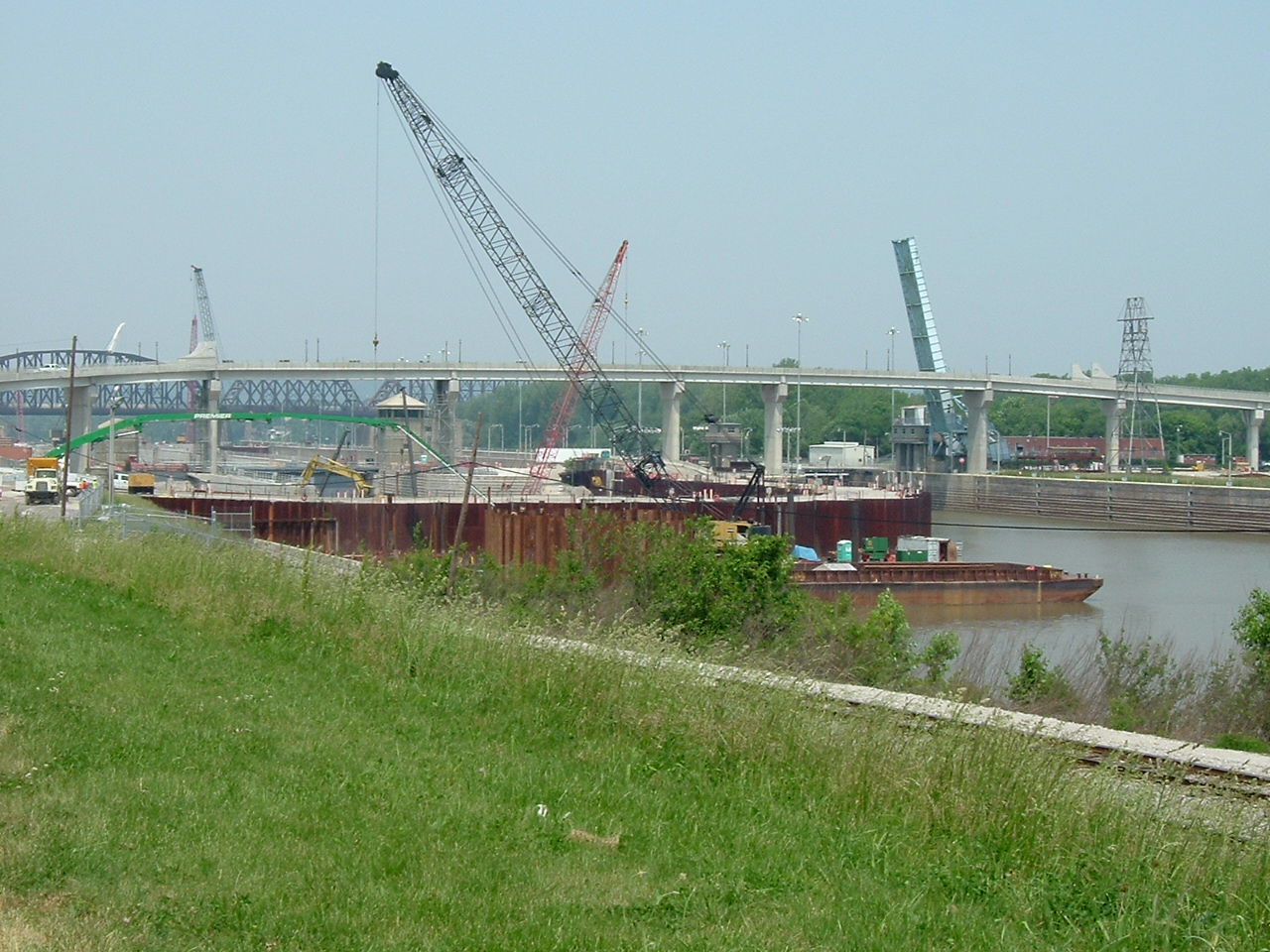
Ongoing work to widen portions of the Louisville and Portland Canal

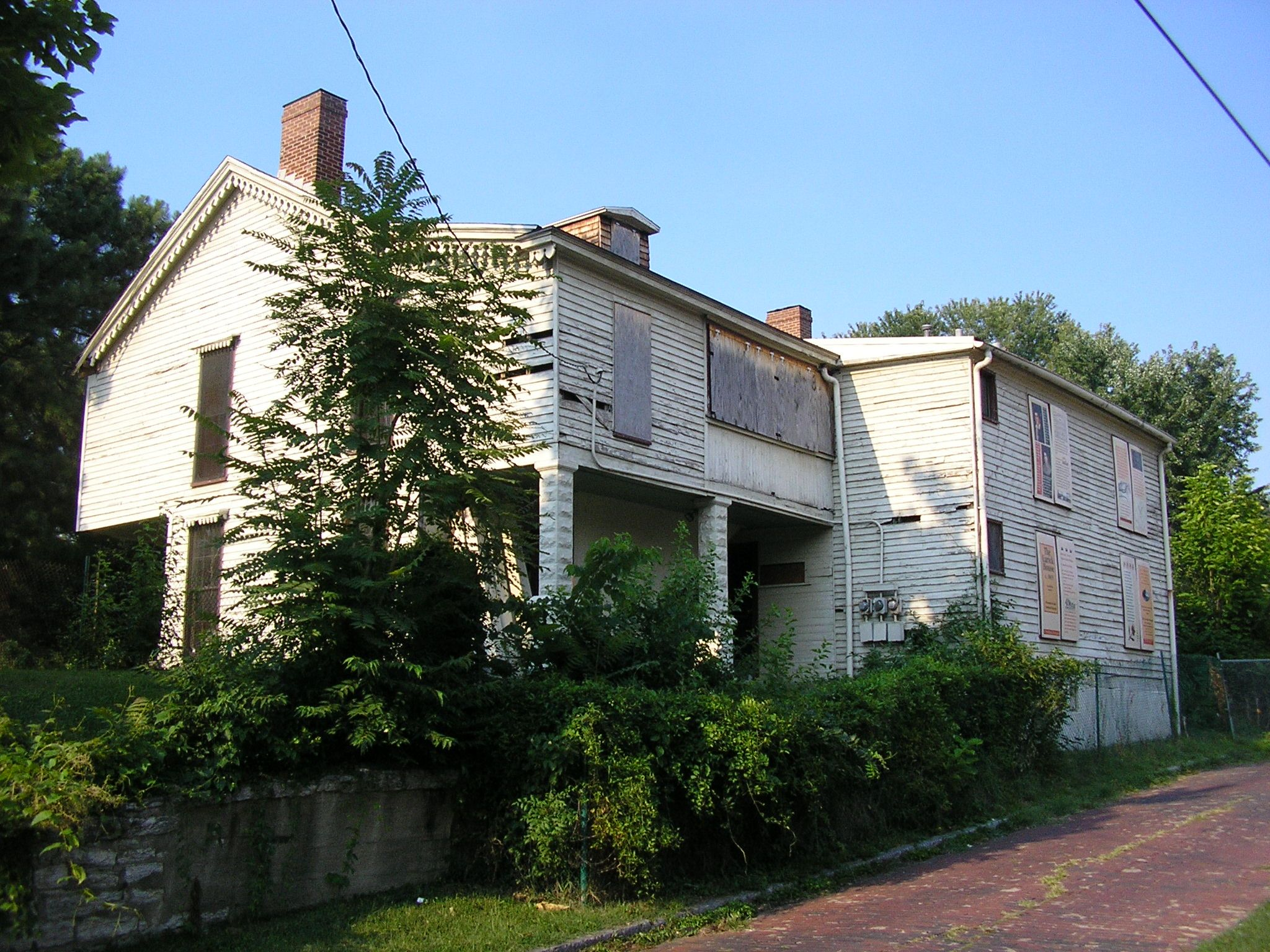
Squire Earick house, the oldest known surviving house in Portland

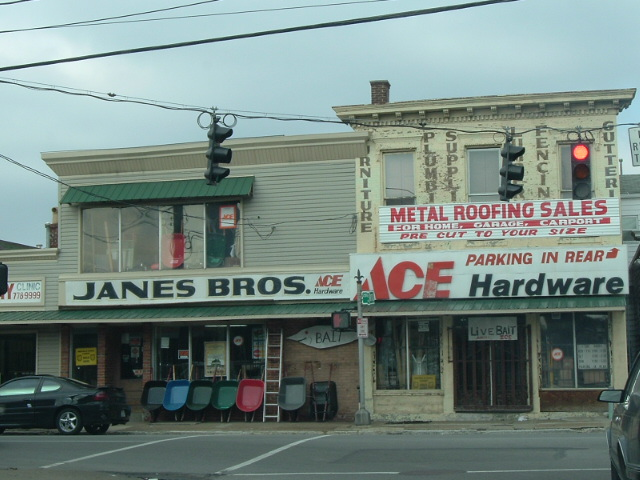
A store in Downtown Portland

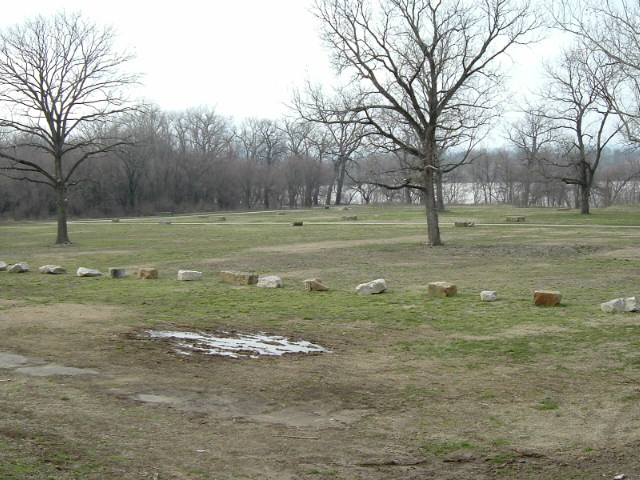
Old Portland Wharf

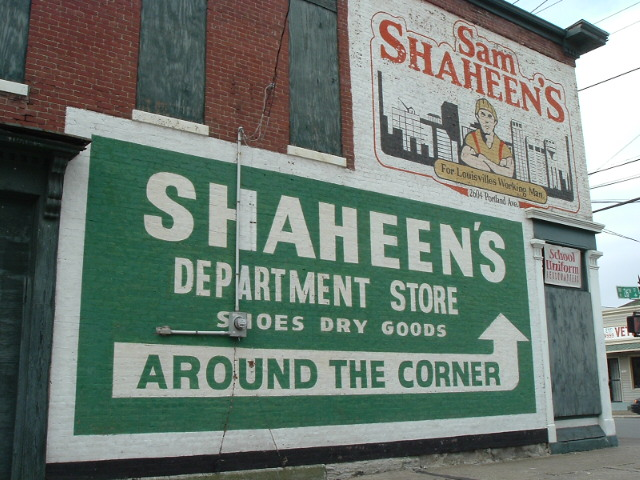
Wall mural at 26th and Portland Ave

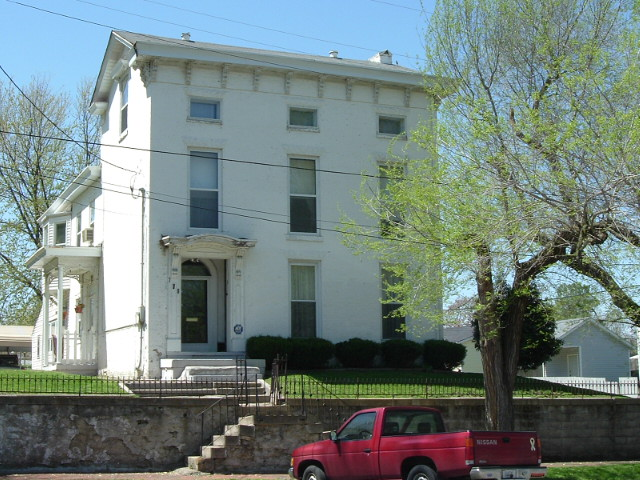
A historic home on 34th Street

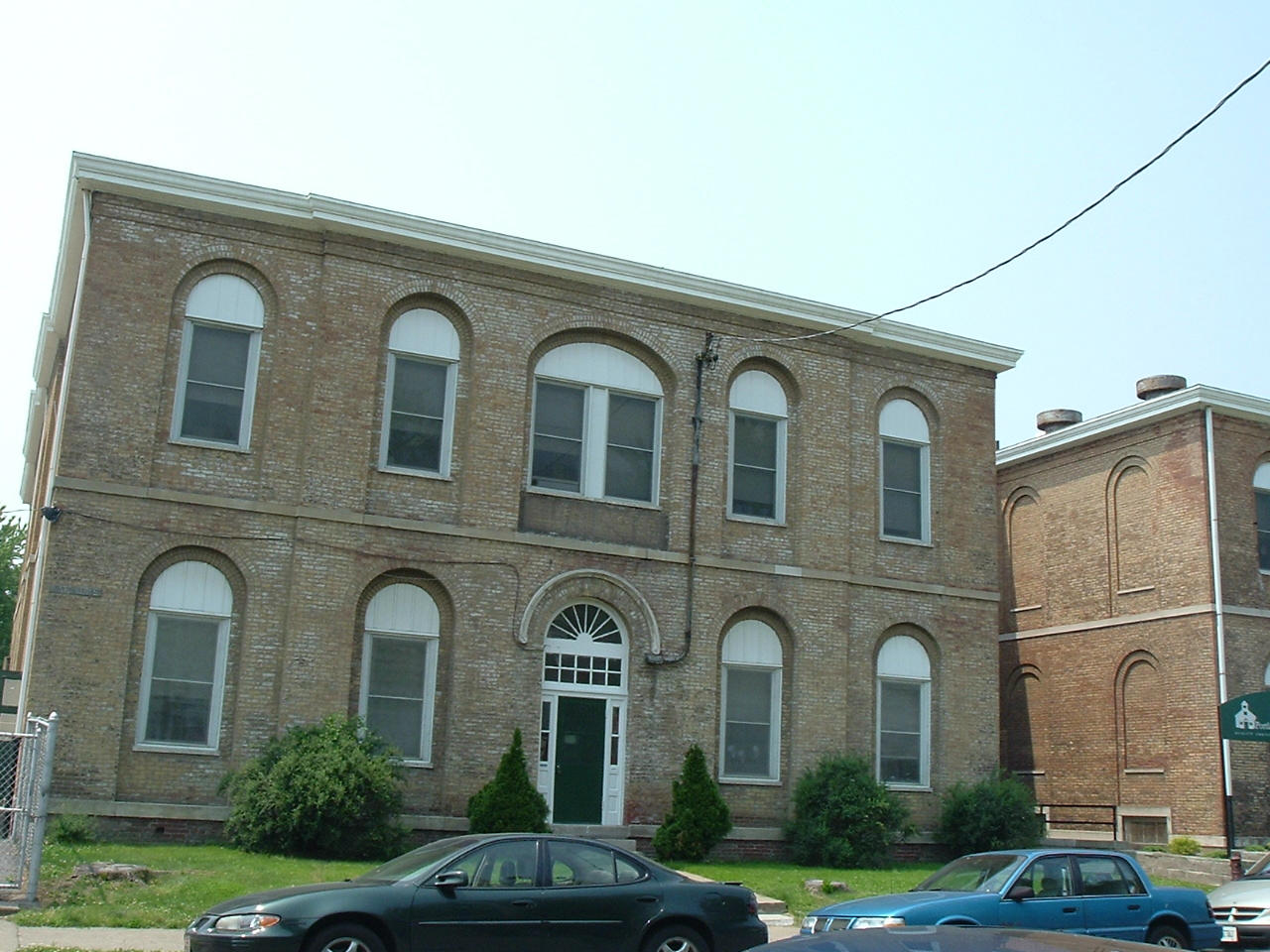
Montgomery Street School, completed in 1852

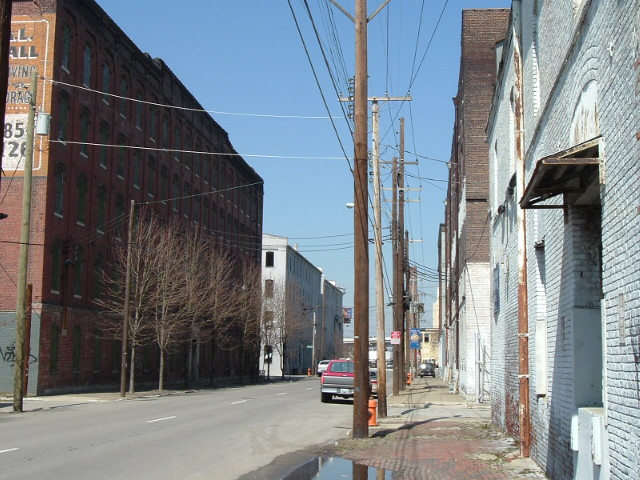
Portland Warehouse District

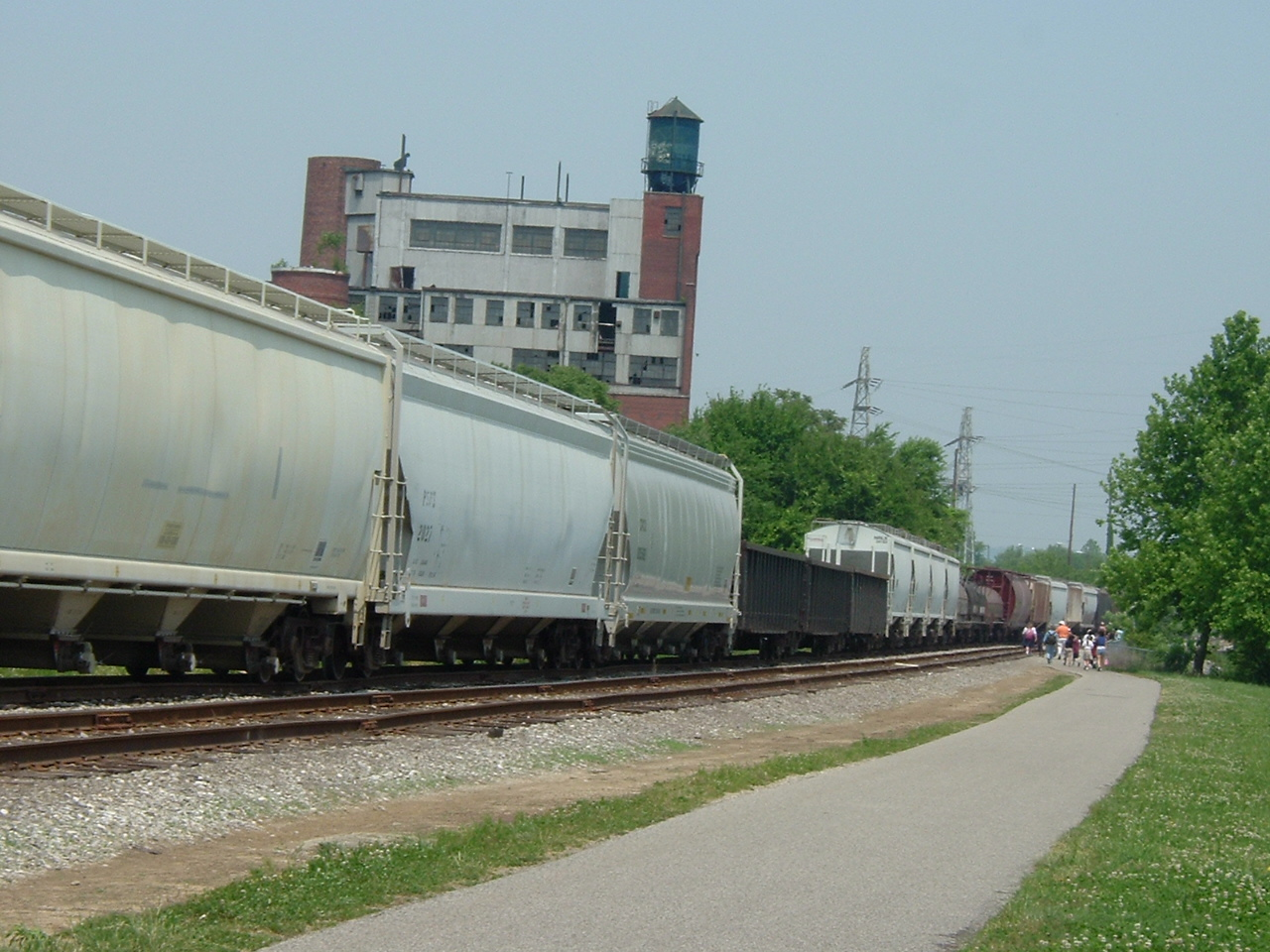
The River Walk

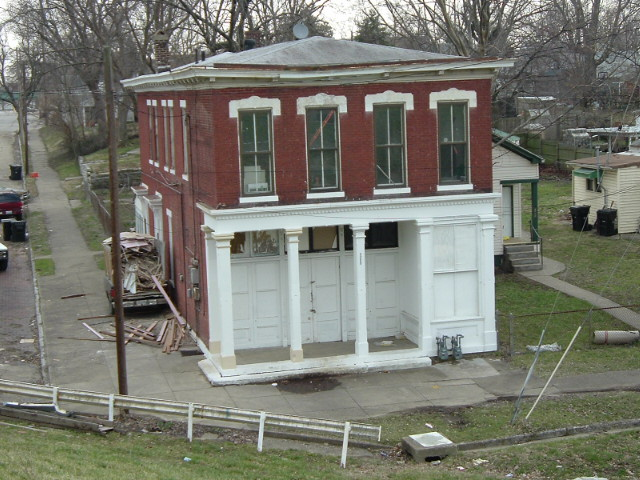
An Italianate style building at 32nd and Rudd

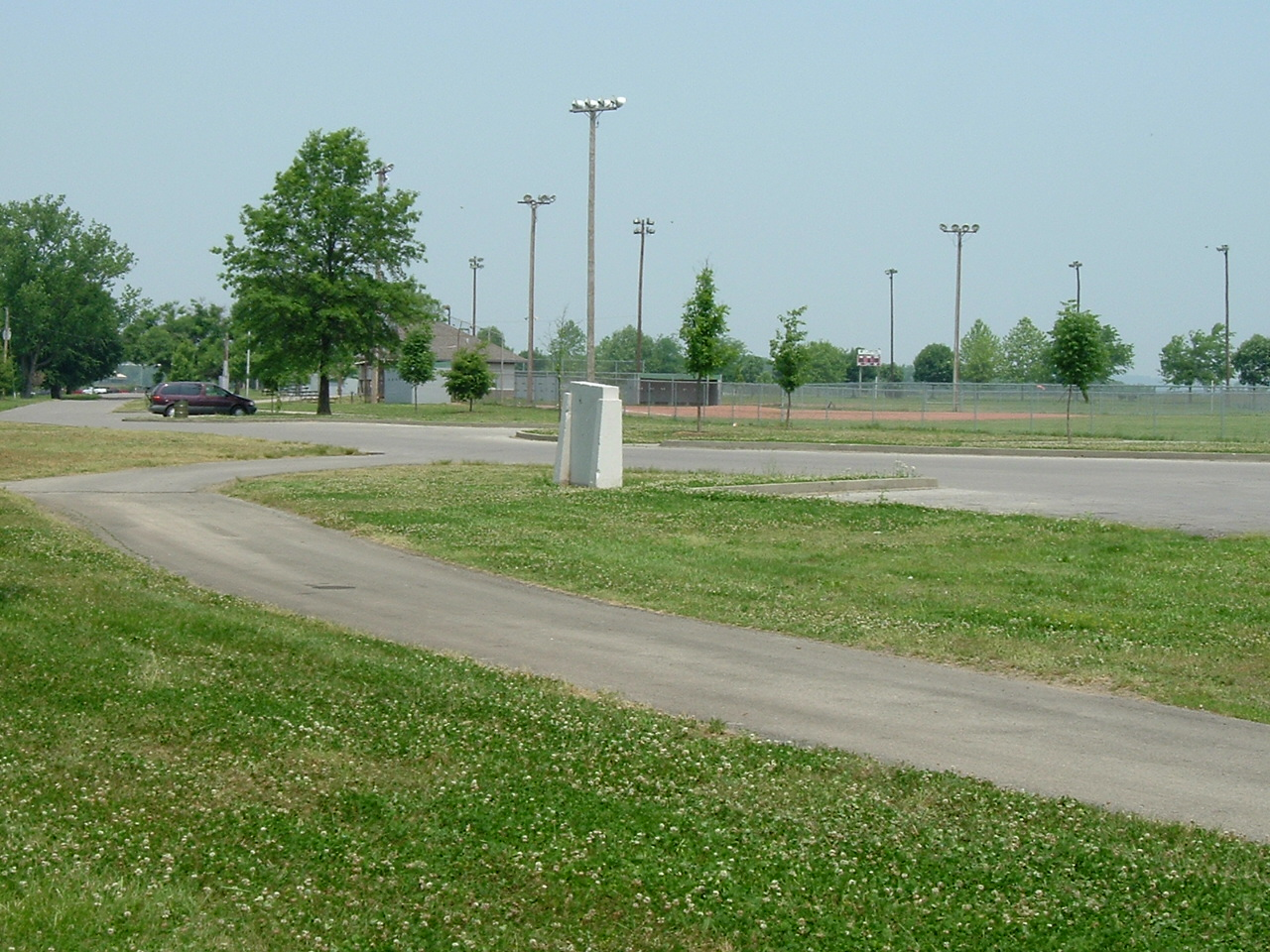
Portland's Lannon Park

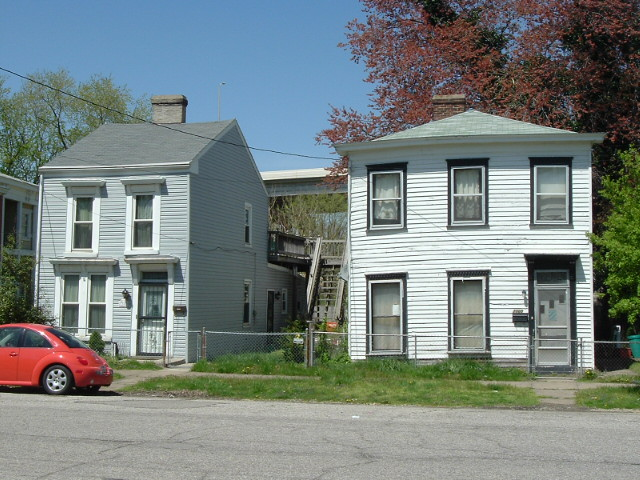
Pre Civil War homes on Rudd Ave

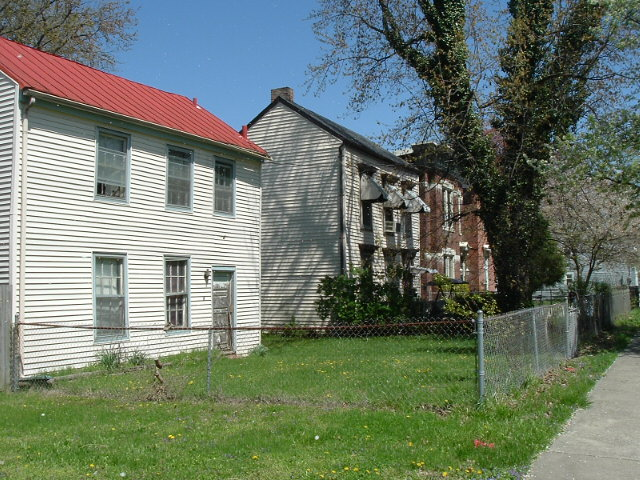
Pre Civil War homes on Rudd Ave

== See also ==
- West Main District, Louisville
