= 14th Cavalry =

14th Cavalry may refer to:

== Divisions ==
- 14th Cavalry Division (Russian Empire)
- 14th Cavalry Division (Soviet Union)

== Brigades ==
- 14th Cavalry Brigade (British Indian Army)
- 14th (Meerut) Cavalry Brigade

== Regiments ==
- 14th Cavalry Regiment (United States)
- 14th Horse (Scinde Horse)
- 14th King's Hussars
- 14th Reserve Cavalry Regiment
- XIV Corps Cavalry Regiment

=== American Civil War regiments ===
==== Union Army ====
- 14th Illinois Cavalry Regiment
- 14th Kansas Cavalry Regiment
- 14th Kentucky Cavalry Regiment
- 14th Pennsylvania Cavalry Regiment

==== Confederate Army ====
- 14th Confederate Cavalry Regiment
- 14th Missouri Cavalry Battalion
- 14th Texas Cavalry Regiment
- 14th Virginia Cavalry Regiment

== See also ==
- 14th Division (disambiguation)
- 14th Brigade (disambiguation)
- 14th Regiment (disambiguation)
- 14th (disambiguation)
