= XIV Corps =

14 Corps, 14th Corps, Fourteenth Corps, or XIV Corps may refer to:

== Germany ==
=== German Empire ===
- XIV Corps (German Empire), Imperial German Army, prior to and during World War I
- XIV Reserve Corps, Imperial German Army, World War I

=== Nazi Germany ===
- XIV Panzer Corps, Wehrmacht
- XIV SS Corps, Waffen-SS

== Russia and Soviet Union ==
- 14th Army Corps (Russian Empire), Imperial Russian Army, 1877–1918
- 14th Army Corps (Russian Federation), Russian Ground Forces, 2016–present
- 14th Mechanized Corps, Soviet Union

== United Kingdom ==
- XIV Corps (United Kingdom)

=== Artillery Volunteer Corps ===
- 14th (Ilfracombe) Devonshire Artillery Volunteer Corps
- 14th Lanarkshire Artillery Volunteer Corps
- 14th (Liverpool) Lancashire Artillery Volunteer Corps

=== Rifle Volunteer Corps ===
- 14th (Tiverton) Devonshire Rifle Volunteer Corps
- 14th (Cheltenham) Gloucestershire Rifle Volunteer Corps
- 14th (Bolton) Lancashire Rifle Volunteer Corps
- 14th (Edge Hill) Lancashire Rifle Volunteer Corps
- 14th (Inns of Court) Middlesex Rifle Volunteer Corps
- 14th (Crawley) Sussex Rifle Volunteer Corps

== United States ==
- XIV Corps (United States)
- XIV Corps (Union Army), American Civil War

== Other countries ==
- XIV Corps (Grande Armée), Imperial French Army, Napoleonic Wars
- XIV Corps (India)
- XIV Army Corps (Italy)
- XIV Corps (Ottoman Empire)
- 14th Army Corps (Ukraine)

== See also ==
- List of military corps by number
- 14th Army (disambiguation)
- 14th Battalion (disambiguation)
- 14th Brigade (disambiguation)
- 14th Division (disambiguation)
- 14th Regiment (disambiguation)
- 14th Squadron (disambiguation)
- 14th (disambiguation)
