= 14th Battalion =

14th Battalion may refer to:

- 14th Battalion (Australia)
- 14th Battalion (Royal Montreal Regiment), CEF, Canada
- 14th Battalion, Maratha Light Infantry, India
- 14th Transport Battalion "Flavia", military logistics battalion of the Italian Army
- 14th Antiaircraft Artillery Battalion, United States Marine Corps
- 14th Engineer Battalion, United States Army

== See also ==
- 14th Army (Soviet Union)
- 14th Division (disambiguation)
- 14th Brigade (disambiguation)
- 14th Regiment (disambiguation)
- 14th Squadron (disambiguation)
