= Fourteenth Army =

Fourteenth Army or 14th Army may refer to:

- 14th Army (People's Republic of China)
- 14th Army (German Empire), a World War I field Army
- 14th Army (Wehrmacht), a World War II field army
- Fourteenth Area Army, Japan
- 14th Army (RSFSR)
- 14th Air and Air Defence Forces Army, Russia
- 14th Air Army, Soviet Union
- 14th Army (Soviet Union)
- 14th Guards Combined Arms Army, Soviet Union, occupied Moldovan Transnistria during the Transnistria War
- Fourteenth Army (United Kingdom)
- Fourteenth United States Army, a World War II 'phantom' force

== See also ==
- List of armies by number
- XIV Corps (disambiguation)
- 14th Division (disambiguation)
- 14th Brigade (disambiguation)
- 14th Regiment (disambiguation)
- 14th Battalion (disambiguation)
- 14th Squadron (disambiguation)
- 14th (disambiguation)
