= Fourteenth =

Fourteenth is the ordinal form of the number 14 (number). Fourteenth or 14th may also refer to:

- A fraction, 1/14th, equal to one of 14 equal parts
- Fourteenth of the month, a recurring calendar date

== Geography ==
- 14th meridian east, a line of longitude
- 14th meridian west, a line of longitude
- 14th parallel north, a circle of latitude
- 14th parallel south, a circle of latitude
- 14th Avenue (disambiguation)
- 14th Street (disambiguation)

== Military ==
- Fourteenth Air Force
- Fourteenth Army (disambiguation)
- 14th Brigade (disambiguation)
- 14th Division (disambiguation)
- 14th Regiment (disambiguation)
- 14th Squadron (disambiguation)

== Other uses ==
- Fourteenth Doctor
- Fourteenth (interval)
- 14th Amendment
  - Fourteenth Amendment to the United States Constitution
- 14th century
- 14th century BC
- 14th (film), a 2026 American documentary film

== See also ==
- 14 (disambiguation)
- Fourteener, a high peak in United States mountains
- Fourteener (poetry), a line of 14 syllables
