= Ukrainian Armed Forces branch insignia =

Branch Insignia of the Ukrainian Armed Forces

Branch insignia of the Ukrainian Armed Forces refers to one of several military emblems that may be worn on the uniform of the Ukrainian Armed Forces to denote membership in a particular area of expertise.

== History ==
Most insignia have been in use since independence in 1991. Many of these insignia are direct copies of their equivalents in the Soviet Armed Forces of the late 1980s to early 1990s. In July 2016, the Ukrainian Armed Forces introduced new insignia.

== Branch of Service Insignia ==
=== 2016–present ===
The following are the branch insignia emblems of the Ukrainian Armed Forces used from 2016 to the present:

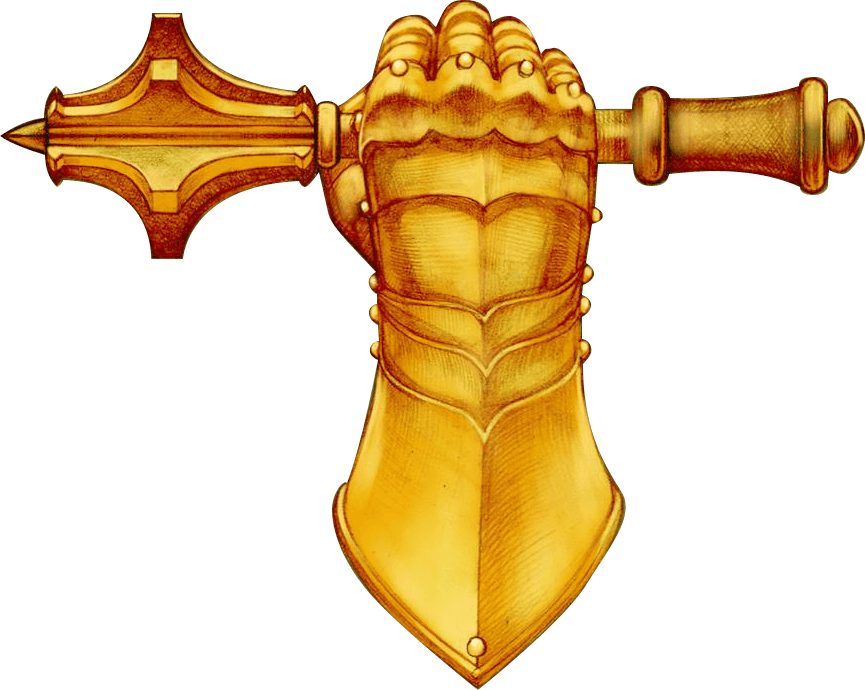
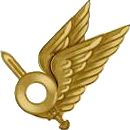
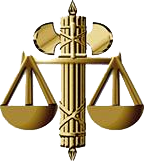
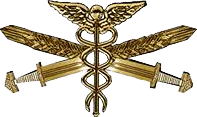
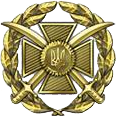
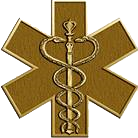
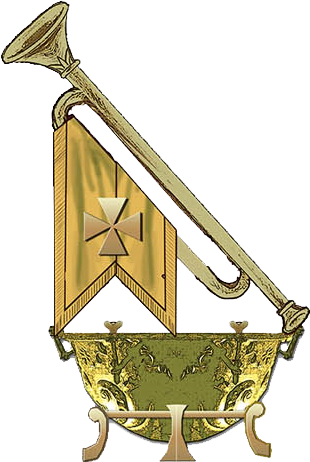
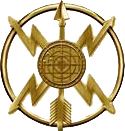
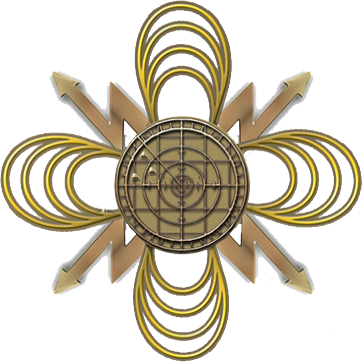
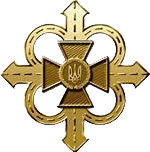
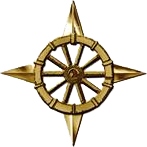
Branch	Insignia	Description
Air Defense Artillery
Air Assault Forces
Armored Forces
Rocket Forces and Artillery
Aviation
Chemical Corps
Engineer
Legal Services
Logistics Troops
General Armed Forces
Marine Corps
Mechanized Infantry
Medical Corps
Military Music Department
Military Police
Radar Support and Radiolocation
Signal Corps
Supply Troops
Transportation Corps

=== 2007–2016 ===
The following are the branch insignia emblems of the Ukrainian Armed Forces used from 2007 to 2016:

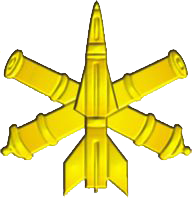
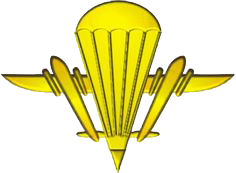
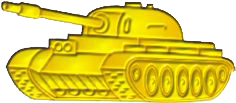
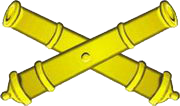
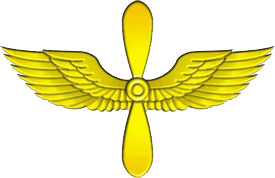
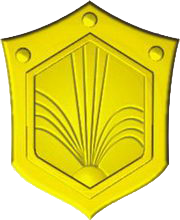
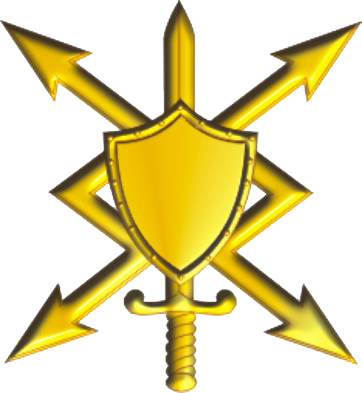
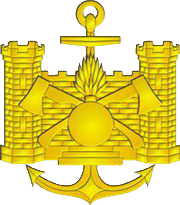
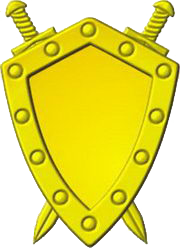
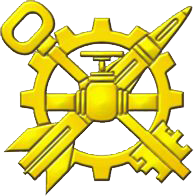
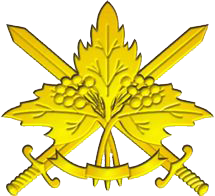
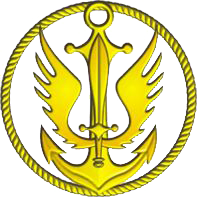
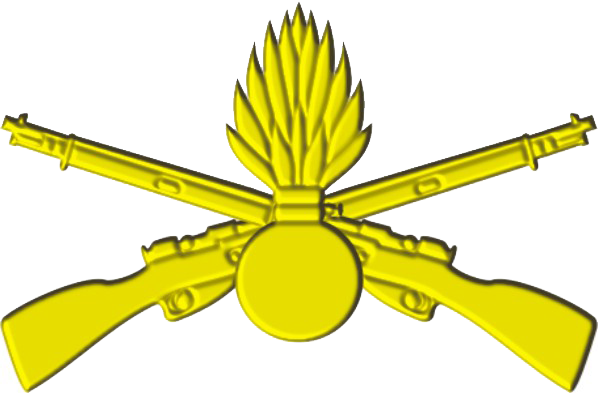
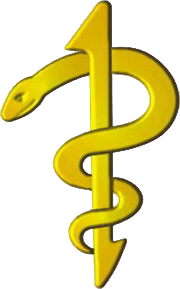
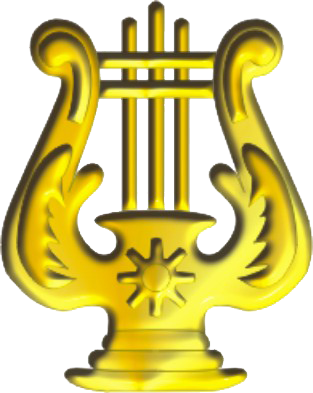
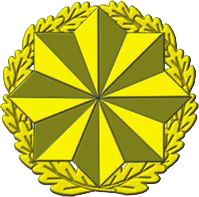
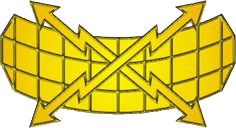
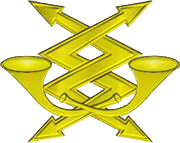
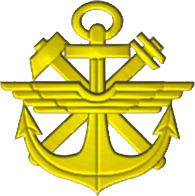
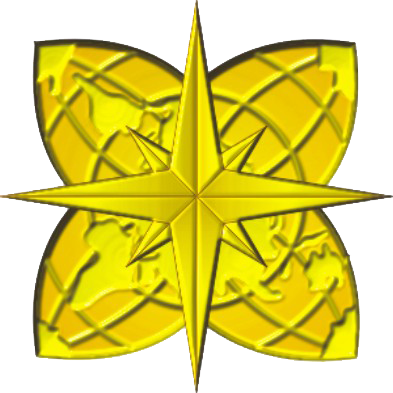
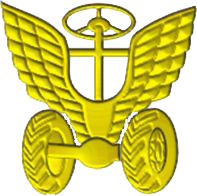
Branch	Insignia	Description
Air Defense Artillery
Airmobile Forces
Armored Force
Rocket Forces and Artillery
Aviation
Chemical Corps
Electronic Warfare Troops
Engineer
Legal Services
Logistics Troops
General Armed Forces
Marine Corps
Mechanized Infantry
Medical Corps
Military Band Service
Military Police
Radio Technical Troops
Signal Troops
Supply Troops
Topographical
Transport Troops
