= 014 =

014 may refer to:

- Argus As 014
- 014 Construction Unit
- Divi Divi Air Flight 014
- Pirna 014
- Tyrrell 014

== See also ==
- 14 (disambiguation)
