= 14th Army Corps (Ukraine) =

Ukrainian Ground Forces formation

- 14-й армійський корпус
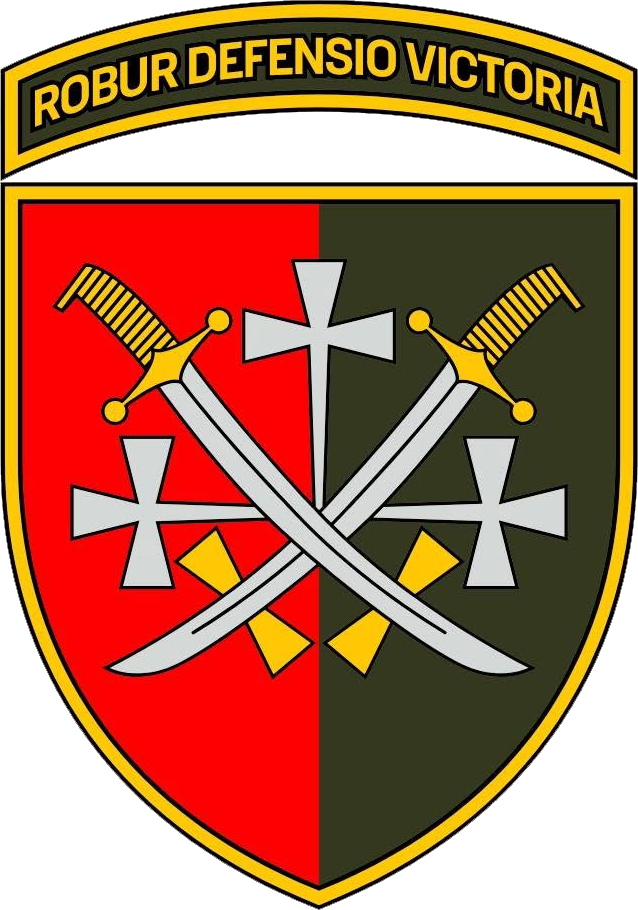
- Insignia of the corps
- Active: February 2025 – present
- Country: Ukraine
- Branch: Ukrainian Ground Forces
- Size: 40,000 - 80,000
- Garrison/HQ: Kyiv
- Mottos: Strength, Defense, Victory
- Engagements: Russo-Ukrainian War
- Website: Official Facebook page

Commanders
- Current commander: Col. Pavlo Zhytnyak

The 14th Army Corps (Ukrainian: 14-й армійський корпус) is a Corps of the Ukrainian Ground Forces.

It was formed as part of Ukraine's ongoing defense reforms. These reforms aim to improve command structures and operational readiness after the Russian invasion of Ukraine (2022) began.

== Structure ==
As of 2026 the corps structure is as follows:

- 14th Army Corps
  - Corps Headquarters
    - Management
    - Commandant Platoon
  - 22nd Mechanized Brigade
  - 29th Heavy Mechanized Brigade
  - 42nd Mechanized Brigade
  - 50th Artillery Brigade
  - 53rd Reconnaissance Battalion
  - 58th Motorized Brigade
  - 92nd Assault Brigade
  - 92nd Anti-Tank Battalion
  - 97th Support Battalion
  - 105th Territorial Defense Brigade
  - 119th Territorial Defense Brigade
  - 419th Unmanned Systems Battalion
  - 513th Repair and Restoration Battalion
  - Kharkiv Border Detachment
