= 14th Infantry =

14th Infantry may refer to:

- 14th Infantry Division (disambiguation)
- 14th Infantry Brigade (disambiguation)
- 14th Infantry Regiment (disambiguation)

== See also ==
- 14th (disambiguation)
