= 14th Rifle Division =

14th Rifle Division can refer to:

- 14th Guards Motor Rifle Division, Soviet Union
- 14th Guards Rifle Division, Soviet Union
- 14th Rifle Division (Soviet Union, 1922–1944)
- 14th Rifle Division (Soviet Union, 1955–1957)

== See also ==
- 14th Division (disambiguation)
