= NS14 =

NS14, NS-14, NS 14, or N.S. 14 may refer to:

== Places ==
- Khatib MRT station (station code: NS14), Yishun, Singapore
- Myōkenguchi Station (station code: NS14), Toyono, Toyono District, Osaka Prefecture, Japan
- Cumberland North (constituency N.S. 14), Nova Scotia, Canada
- Nickerie District (FIPS region code NS14), Suriname

== Other uses ==
- NS14 (dinghy class) (Northbridge Senior 14), Australian sailing dinghy development class
- Blue Origin NS-14, a 2021 January 14 Blue Origin suborbital spaceflight mission for the New Shepard
- RAF N.S. 14, a British NS class airship

== See also ==
- NS (disambiguation)
- 14 (disambiguation)
