= 14 =

Fourteen or 14 most often refers to:

- 14 (number), the natural number following 13 and preceding 15
- One of the years 14 BC, AD 14, 1914, 2014

Fourteen or 14 may also refer to:

== Arts and media ==
=== Music ===
- 14th (band), a British electronic music duo
- 14 (album), by David Garrett, 2013
- 14, an unreleased album by Charli XCX
- "14" (song), 2007, by Paula Cole from Courage

=== Other media ===
- Fourteen (film), a 2019 American film directed by Dan Sallitt
- Fourteen (play), 1919, by Alice Gerstenberg
- Fourteen (manga), 1990, series by Kazuo Umezu
- 14 (novel), a 2013 science fiction novel by Peter Clines
- The 14, a 1973 British drama film directed by David Hemmings

== Other uses ==
- Fourteen, West Virginia, US, an unincorporated community
- Lot Fourteen, redevelopment site in Adelaide, South Australia, previously occupied by the Royal Adelaide Hospital
- The Fourteen, former political faction in Turkey
- "The Fourteen", a nickname for NASA Astronaut Group 3
- Fourteen Words, a phrase used by white supremacists and neo-Nazis
- 14 Irene, an asteroid in the asteroid belt
- Rover 14, various mid-sized cars produced by Rover
- Hillman 14, a family car

== See also ==
- 1/4 (disambiguation)
- Fourteenth (disambiguation)
- Fourteener, a high peak in US mountains
- Fourteener (poetry), a line of 14 syllables
- Fourteen 14, an Italian Eurodance project
- List of highways numbered 14
- Onefour, an Australian rap group
- Onefour, Alberta, a research substation in Canada
