= The Fourteen =

The Fourteen (Turkish: Ondörtler) was a group consisting of fourteen military officers who were later purged from the National Unity Committee, the military government established after the 1960 Turkish coup d'état. The group was led by Staff Colonel Alparslan Türkeş. The Fourteen group was against some fundamental political reforms and was not in favor of handing over the power to a civilian administration.

The purge of the Fourteen became the most important turning point for the military regime. With this purge, the faction that supported handing the power back to the civilians had conclusively secured the power.

== Background ==
There was no uniform political aim within the officers who formed the National Unity Committee after the coup. Two different political views were gradually formed within the Committee. According to the first view, the aim of the coup was limited to; re-establishing the democratic system, preparing the legal groundwork for such system, conducting elections as soon as possible and handing the power back to the incoming civilian government. The second view argued that Turkey has had fundamental political, social and economical problems and a healthy democracy would not be formed without solving such problems at first. This group, which was later called as the Fourteen, refused to hand back the power to the civilians as soon as possible, and asserted that the military government should rule over the country for a long time.

The Fourteen's general political tendencies was that the current political organizations could not bring any concrete solutions to such big problems as they are, in their words, "status quoist-conservative" ("statükocu-muhafazakâr"). According to the group; Turkey must not have lost any time, and therefore a strong and unbiased National Unity Committee government should have enacted the reforms such as the socialization of healthcare and land reform. For such reforms, the Fourteen argued that the military regime should have stayed in power for at least four years.

== Purge ==
İsmet İnönü, Leader of the Republican People's Party and also one of the well-regarded former generals who fought in the Turkish War of Independence, asserted his influence for ending the military rule and the transfer of power to the civilians. İnönü's stance has helped consolidate the first faction within the National Unity Committee. As a result of the rifts within the Committee becoming a political crisis, Cemal Gürsel issued a declaration on 13 October 1960 as the leader of the National Unity Committee. The declaration stated that the works of the committee was endangering the country's supreme interests; hence the committee was dissolved in accordance with the wishes of Turkish Armed Forces and the members of the Committee. Subsequently, a new National Unity Committee was formed. The new committee did not include Fazıl Akkoyunlu, Rıfat Baykal, Ahmet Er, Orhan Erkanlı, Numan Esin, Orhan Kabibay, Mustafa Kaplan, Muzaffer Karan, Münir Köseoğlu, Muzaffer Özdağ, İrfan Solmazer, Şefik Soyuyüce, Dündar Taşer and Alparslan Türkeş; who formed the Fourteen. As a result of this purge led by General Cemal Madanoğlu, all of the fourteen officers were retired from Turkish Armed Forces and were exiled to various diplomatic posts abroad.

According to Enver Altaylı's claim, the military officers were to be executed as a result of the arrests made by Cemal Madanoğlu and his faction. However, with the intervention of Central Intelligence Agency officer Ruzi Nazar stationed in Turkey, the United States pressured Cemal Gürsel against the execution of the fourteen officers.

== Aftermath ==
The Fourteen had continued advancing and discussing their ideas while abroad and agreed to continue their struggle via political parties after returning to Turkey. However, the group split in two in the meantime. Orhan Kabibay, Orhan Erkanlı and İrfan Solmazer did not accept Türkeş's leadership and stand for elections from Republican People's Party in 1965. Others led by Alparslan Türkeş, Rıfat Baykal, Numan Esin and Muzaffer Özdağ joined the Republican Villagers Nation Party. Muzaffer Karan remained outside both of the groups and joined the Workers' Party of Turkey.

== Criticism ==
According to Abdi İpekçi, when considering the directives presented to the second military government on 10 September 1960 by the Fourteen; even though there were directives inclined towards fascism, there were socialist directives as well. The socialist directives were centered around topics such as land reform, housing problem, socialisation of healthcare, justice for workers, social justice, campaign for primary schools, and a statist economy instead of a liberal economy. Fascist tendencies were exampled by racist and nationalist speeches delivered by the members of the movement, a bad-faith view against non-Muslims, the purge of academicians from universities, and organizations like the Grey Wolves resembling fascist organizations. For these reasons, Abdi İpekçi criticized the Fourteen for the absence of an ideological identity.

== Fate of the Fourteen ==
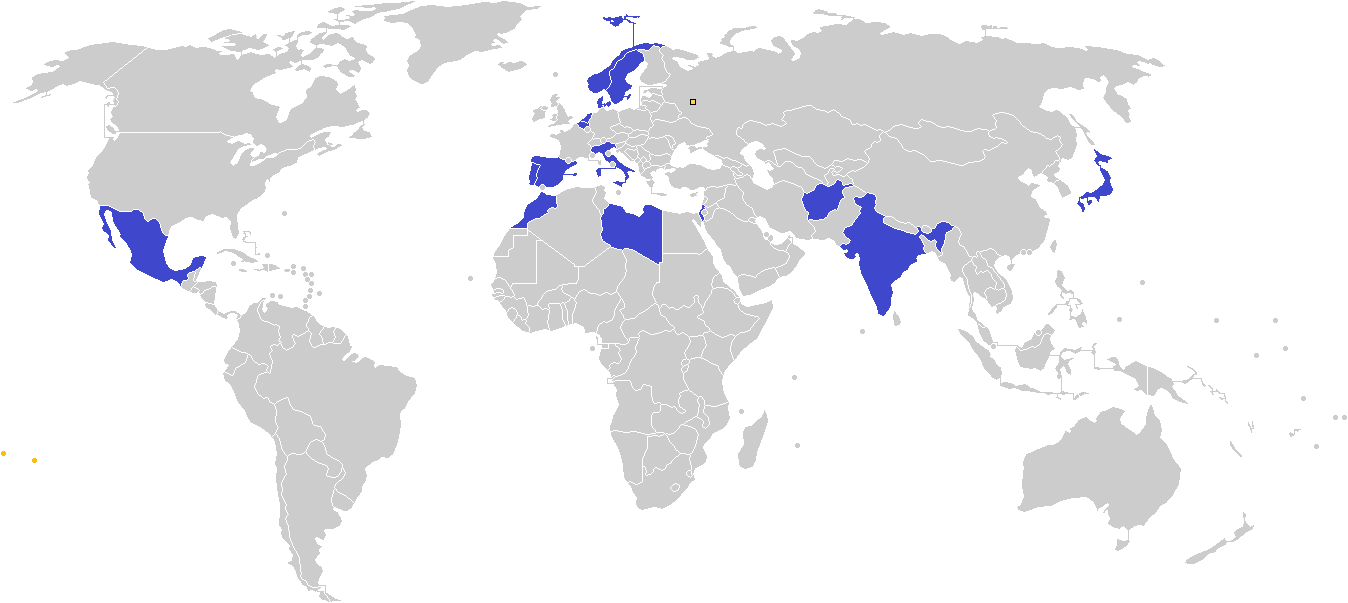
The countries where the fourteen officers resided during their exile. (Şefik Soyuyüce was first exiled to Denmark, then to Italy.)

#	Name	Place of residency	Political party membership after the return	Date of death
1	Staff Colonel Alparslan Türkeş	New Delhi, India	Republican Villagers Nation Party (CKMP)	4 April 1997
2	Staff Colonel Mustafa Kaplan	Lisbon, Portugal	Republican Villagers Nation Party (CKMP)	26 June 2017
3	Staff Major Dündar Taşer	Rabat, Morocco	Republican Villagers Nation Party (CKMP)	14 June 1972
4	Staff Major Şefik Soyuyüce	Copenhagen, Denmark (first) Rome, Italy (second)	Republican Villagers Nation Party (CKMP)	18 September 2024
5	Infantry Captain Fazıl Akkoyunlu	Kabul, Afghanistan	Republican Villagers Nation Party (CKMP)	12 February 1976
6	Senior Lietunant Commander Rıfat Baykal	Tel Aviv, Israel	Republican Villagers Nation Party (CKMP)	9 June 2000
7	Staff Captain Numan Esin	Madrid, Spain	Republican Villagers Nation Party (CKMP)	6 January 2020
8	Staff Captain Muzaffer Özdağ	Tokyo, Japan	Republican Villagers Nation Party (CKMP)	6 February 2002
9	Gendarmerie Captain Ahmet Er	Tripolitania, Libya	Republican Villagers Nation Party (CKMP)	29 May 2017
10	Staff Lietunant Colonel Orhan Kabibay	Brussels, Belgium	Republican People's Party (CHP)	24 July 2002
11	Staff Major Orhan Erkanlı	Mexico City, Mexico	Republican People's Party (CHP)	28 March 1995
12	Staff Captain İrfan Solmazer	The Hague, Netherlands	Republican People's Party (CHP)	25 October 2008
13	Tank Major Muzaffer Karan	Oslo, Norway	Workers' Party of Turkey (TİP)	10 January 2006
14	Staff Lieutenant Commander Münir Köseoğlu	Stockholm, Sweden	Did not enter into politics.	19 March 2002
