= 14th Street Bridge =

14th Street Bridge may refer to:

- Fourteenth Street Bridge (Ohio River) in Louisville, Kentucky
- 14th Street Bridges over the Potomac River in Washington, D.C.

== See also ==
- 14th Street (disambiguation)
