= Fourteenth of the month =

Recurring ordinal calendar date

The fourteenth of the month or fourteenth day of the month is the recurring calendar date position corresponding to the day numbered 14 of each month. In the Gregorian calendar (and other calendars that number days sequentially within a month), this day occurs in every month of the year, and therefore occurs twelve times per year.

- Fourteenth of January
- Fourteenth of February
- Fourteenth of March
- Fourteenth of April
- Fourteenth of May
- Fourteenth of June
- Fourteenth of July
- Fourteenth of August
- Fourteenth of September
- Fourteenth of October
- Fourteenth of November
- Fourteenth of December

In addition to these dates, this date occurs in months of many other calendars, such as the Bengali calendar and the Hebrew calendar.

== See also ==
- Fourteenth (disambiguation)
