= 53rd Reconnaissance Battalion (Ukraine) =

- 53-й окремий розвідувальний батальйон
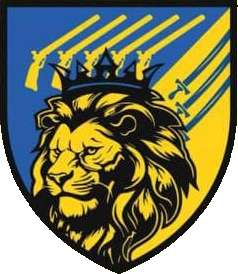
- Battalion's insignia
- Founded: 2022
- Country: Ukraine
- Allegiance: Armed Forces of Ukraine
- Branch: Ukrainian Ground Forces
- Type: Battalion, spetsnaz
- Role: Reconnaissance, counteroffensive and sabotage
- Part of: 116th Mechanized Brigade
- Garrison/HQ: Lviv Oblast
- Engagements: Russo-Ukrainian War; 2022 Russian invasion of Ukraine

The 53rd Separate Reconnaissance Battalion (MUN A4220) is a battalion of the Ukrainian ground forces acting as an independent unit, formerly subordinated to the 116th Mechanized Brigade. It has seen combat during the Russo-Ukrainian war, initially as a rifle battalion and has been performing reconnaissance and combat operations throughout the entire front. It was established in 2022.

== History ==
It was established in 2022 as the 53rd Rifle Battalion in response to the 2022 Russian invasion of Ukraine and was later subordinated to the 116th Mechanized Brigade. On 17 September 2022, two soldiers of the battalion (Baran Oleh Bohdanovych and Matush Maryan Josephovych) were killed in action. On 27 September 2022, a soldier of the battalion (Bochek Yuri Viktorovych) died as a result of injuries sustained in combat.

On 19 February 2023, two soldiers of the battalion (Nykel Ivan Ivanovych and Kondzelko Andri Stepanovych) were killed during the Battle of Bakhmut. Two soldiers of the battalion (Rizak Maksym Volodymyrovych and Moroz Volodymyr Mykolaovych) went MIA in Bakhmut on 19 and 21 February 2023. On 11 March 2023, a soldier of the battalion (Klontsak Mykola Volodymyrovych) was killed in Bakhmut. On 13 March 2023, a soldier of the battalion (Lutsiv Vasyl Vasylovych) was killed in Bakhmut. On 22 March 2023, a soldier of the battalion (Synytsia Volodymyr Ivanovych) was killed in Bakhmut. On 29 March 2023, a soldier of the battalion (Kinash Orest Myroslavovych) was killed in Bakhmut. On 1 April 2023, a soldier of the battalion (Kaspryshyn Vasyl Romanovych) went MIA in Bakhmut. On 13 September 2023, a soldier of the battalion (Vyshynsky Vasyl Yevstakhovych) was killed in action.

On 17 March 2024, a soldier of the battalion (Barna Andri Vasylovych) went MIA and was later confirmed to be dead in November 2024. On 5 May 2024, a soldier of the battalion (Bilas Petro Petrovych) was killed in Staromaiorske. Another soldier of the battalion (Sakhno Mykhailo Romanovych) was killed in Staromaiorske on 7 May 2024. Two soldiers of the battalion (Khmilevsky Nazar Ihorovych and Vaskiv Andri Mykolaovych) were killed in Makarivka on 9 May 2024. On 9 August 2024, a soldier of the battalion (Vistovsky Volodymyr Vasylovych) was killed in Vozdvyzhenka. On 23 August 2024, a soldier of the battalion (Bohatishchev Bohdan Volodymyrovych) was killed in Novohrodivka. On 29 August 2024, a soldier of the battalion (Lopushynsky Petro Petrovych) was killed in action. On 30 November 2024, a soldier of the battalion (Kostenko Kostantyn Anatoliovych) went MIA in Kurakhove.

On 10 March 2025, three soldiers of the battalion (Rachkevych Mykhailo Viktorovych, Pikhurko Petro Bohdanovych and Kikh Petro Petrovych) were killed in Shevchenkove. On 20 April 2025, a soldier of the battalion (Nykyfyrov Vasyl Viktorovych) was killed in action. On 18 July 2025, a soldier of the battalion (Havile Andri Mykolaovych) was killed in action. In August 2025, it became a reconnaissance battalion.

== Equipment ==
- Autel EVO Max 4T
- BRDM-2
- Mitsubishi L200
- Ford Ranger
