= Dündar Taşer =

Turkish politician (1925–1972)

- Born: Dündar Taşer; April 15, 1925; Gaziantep, Turkey
- Died: 14 June 1972 (aged 47); Ankara, Turkey
- Occupation: Soldier
- Employer: Turkish Army
- Known for: Nationalist activist
- Political party: Nationalist Movement Party

Dündar Taşer (April 15, 1925 – June 14, 1972) was a Turkish soldier and politician who was a leading figure in Turkish nationalism.

He was born in Gaziantep to a traditionalist family and underwent training to become an officer in the Turkish Army, eventually reaching the rank of Major. A supporter of the conservative elements in the army, he took part in the coup d'état of Cemal Gürsel on 27 May 1960. But as a member of The Fourteen, a group around Alparslan Türkeş, he was sent into exile to Switzerland to serve as a military attache in the Turkish embassy in Zürich.

Forced to retire from the army, he entered politics along with his close associate Alparslan Türkeş by joining the Republican Villagers Nation Party (CKMP) which was renamed the Nationalist Movement Party (MHP) at the Adana Convention of 1969. With his support the party logo of the three crescents was chosen at the same occasion. A strong advocate of Pan-Turkism and he was responsible for a camp for about a hundred Turkish Cypriot guerrillas in 1968. He supported the privatization of the Turkish economy except for the railways, natural resources and the heavy industry and expressed his opposition towards a Government which would be responsible for the production of shoes or managing hotels. Besides he demanded the foundation of agricultural towns of about 5,000 peasants to prevent the migration of the rural population to the urban centers. In support of his capitalist views he portrayed Mustafa Kemal Atatürk a capitalist landowner. He was a fierce irredentist and advocated for the conquer of the territories lost during the Russo-Turkish war in 1877-78.

He died in a road accident in 1972. Following his death his friend, the historian Ziya Nur Aksun, collected many of his words and published them.
