= 14th Air Defence Artillery Regiment (Belgium) =

Air defence artillery regiment in the Land Component of the Belgian Armed Forces

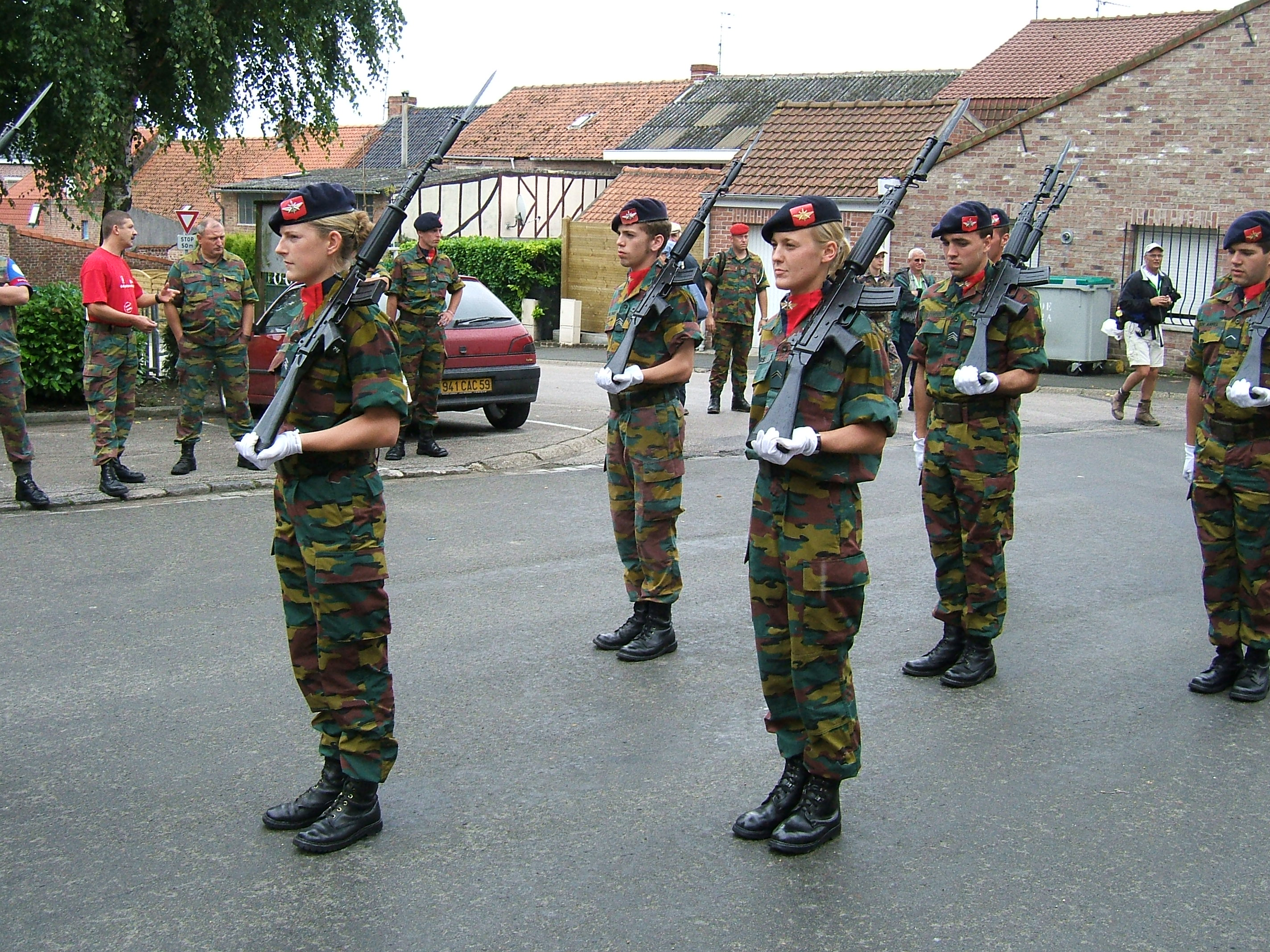
- Drill demonstration platoon of 14A
- Country: Belgium
- Branch: Land Component
- Type: Artillery
- Role: Air defence
- Garrison/HQ: Lombardsijde
- Equipment: Mistral missile
- Battle honours: Reigersvliet; Eessen

The 14th Air Defence Artillery Regiment (Dutch: 14 Regiment Luchtdoelartillerie) is an air defence artillery regiment in the Land Component of the Belgian Armed Forces. It is the successor of the 14th Regiment of Artillery.

== Organisation ==
The 14th Air Defence Regiment comprises two Mistral batteries, the 43rd Battery and the 35th Battery, which consist of three platoons each. In turn, each platoon consists of six Mistral groups, which means that there are 36 Mistral groups in the regiment.
