= Armoured Forces (Ukraine) =

Armoured Troops
- Танкові війська
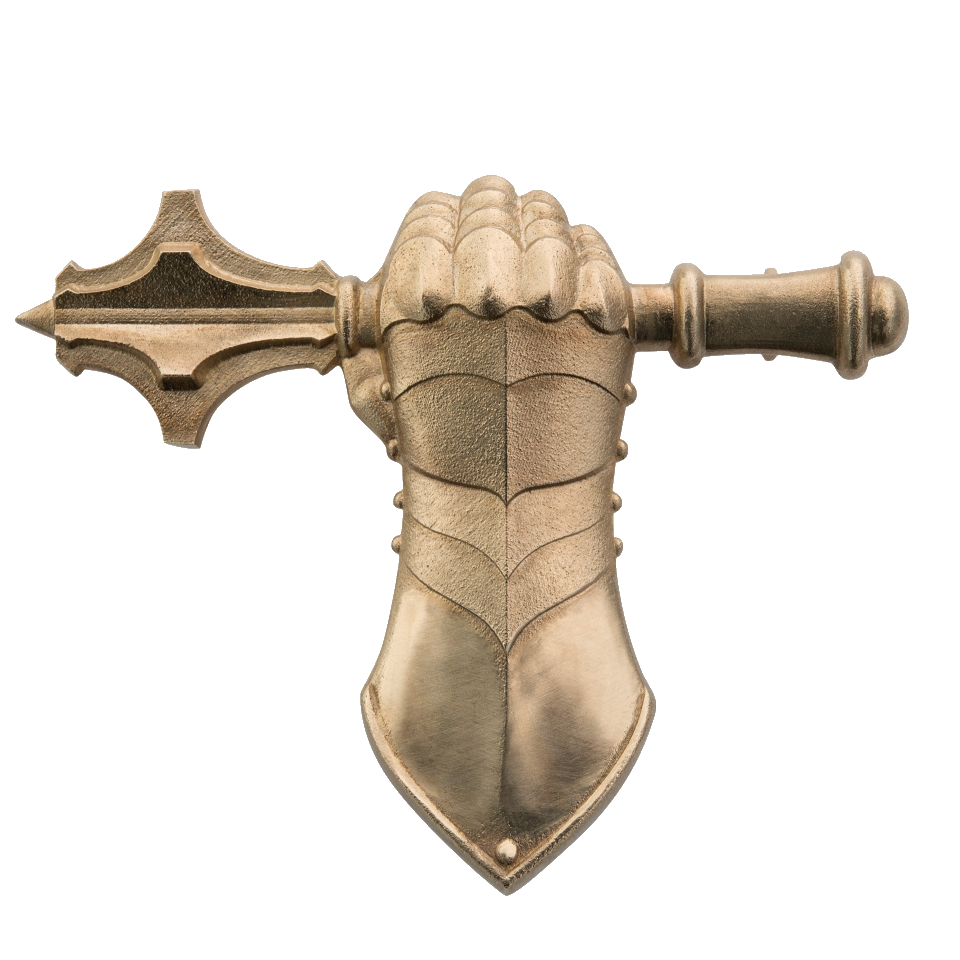
- The Armoured Forces branch insignia
- Active: 1992—2025
- Country: Ukraine
- Allegiance: Armed Forces of Ukraine
- Branch: Ukrainian Ground Forces
- Type: Armored corps
- Role: Armoured warfare

Insignia
- Shoulder sleeve insignia

The Armoured Troops (Ukrainian: Танкові війська, romanized: Tankovi viys’ka) were the armored corps of the Ukrainian Ground Forces, the main striking force of ground troops. They were used primarily in conjunction with mechanized forces in key areas and perform the following tasks:

- in defense - support of mechanized troops in repelling the enemy attack and developing counterattacks;
- in the attack - the application of powerful strokes to dissect enemy lines in greater depth, development of success, and defeat the enemy in counter-battles and battles.

== Duties and tasks ==
The basis of the Armoured Forces were the armoured brigades and armoured battalions of the infantry brigades (mechanized, assault mechanized, light infantry, rifle infantry and mountain), which have resistance to the striking factors of both conventional and nuclear weapons, firepower, high mobility and maneuverability. They were able to make the most complete use of the results of fire (nuclear) damage to the enemy and in a short time to achieve the final goals of combat operations in wartime.

The combat capabilities of the armoured brigades in wartime operations allowed them to conduct active combat operations either in day and/or night scenarios, at a considerable distance from other friendly forces, to crush the enemy in counter-attacks and battles, to overcome large areas of radioactive contamination on the move, crossing water obstacles, and also to quickly create a strong defense and successfully resist the onslaught of overwhelming enemy forces.

== History ==
Of those 3 former armoured divisions that entered the ranks of the then young Ukrainian Ground Forces in 1991–92 from the Soviet Army, only one, the 17th, retained its armoured role into most of the 21st century when it was reflagged as a brigade. The brigade carried with it battle honours won in the Second World War, which would be removed in the 2010s after Euromaidan. In the 2020s, it was transformed to mechanized infantry.

In 1997, on the basis of an armored regiment of what is now the 72nd Mechanized Infantry Brigade, the 1st Tank Brigade was raised. These two brigades were the armored fist the nation had for so many years till 2014 and the War in Donbas, in which the armored force was increased in strength and numbers with the raising of new brigades. The 1st Brigade was the senior brigade of the Ukrainian Armored Forces. In 2025, all the Brigades were redesignated as Heavy Mechanized Brigades during army reorganization efforts.

=== Organization of the Ukrainian armoured division until the 2000s ===
- Division Headquarters and Headquarters Battalion
- 3x Armoured Brigades/Regiments
- Mechanized Infantry Brigade/Regiment
- Field Artillery Regiment
- Anti-Air Defense Artillery Battalion
- Mortar Battery
- Combat Engineer Regiment/Battalion
- Signals Battalion
- Armored Reconnaissance Battalion
- Logistics Regiment
- Chemical, biological, radiological and nuclear defense Company
- Radar Company
- Military Police company
- Division Band

== Brigade organization ==
Armored Brigades in Ukrainian service under the UGF were designed to provide heavy support to mechanized infantry brigades during offensive and defensive operations or on their own accord depending on the circumstances. Unlike the mechanized, mountain, assault, motorized and rifle infantry brigades, armored brigades did not had a motorized infantry battalion attached. The armoured brigades were organized identically into three armored battalions and one mechanized infantry battalion. Due to brigades being designed for independent operations they had a complete set of organic supporting units including a complete artillery regiment, an anti-tank battalion, an anti-aircraft battalion, a sniper company, a recon company, an engineer battalion, material repair battalion, logistics battalion, electronic warfare company, radar company, NBC defense company, signals company, medical company, a commandant's platoon and a brigade military band under HQ.

Since the start of the 2022 Russian Invasion of Ukraine the size and composition of Ukraine's armoured brigades were changed dramatically to include both more men as the Ukrainian Armed Forces mobilize but also to include the different kinds of weapons and equipment being supplied by Ukraine's Western backers.

Headquarters and HQ Company

Tank Battalion (x3)

- Headquarters and Headquarters Company
- Tank Company (x3/x4)
- (Armored) Recon Platoon
- Anti Aircraft Platoon
- Engineer Platoon
- Medical Section
- Combat Service Support Company
  - Technical Support Platoon
  - Material Support Platoon

Before the 2022 Russian Invasion of Ukraine the UGF's then two armored brigades were equipped with either T-64BV tanks, T-64BV mod 2017, or T-80BV tanks. After the invasion Ukraine was able to capture and repurpose large numbers of Russian tanks such as T-72B3M mod 2017, T-72B3, T-72B, T-80BVM, T-80, and T-90M. Western nations have also pledged large numbers of tanks from their own stocks such as their own vintage T-72 models, PT-91 Twardy tanks from Poland, M-84 MBTs from Croatia and more recently Challenger 2 tanks from Britain, Leopard 2 and Leopard 1 tanks from multiple European countries, and the M1A1 Abrams from Australia and the United States. These new additions had also bolstered the armoured fighting forces. But during 2025 army reorganization efforts the whole designation of the Tank Brigades and Tank Forces were abolished and were replaced by a new kind of unit designation called Heavy Mechanized Brigade.

Mechanized Infantry Battalion

- Headquarters and Headquarters Company
- Infantry Company (x3)
- Mortar Battery (6x 120mm)
- Grenade Platoon (6x AGS-17)
- Recon Platoon
- Air Defense Platoon (9x Igla MANPAD)
- Combat Engineer Platoon
- Signals Platoon
- Battalion Medical Center
- Supply Company
  - Technical Support Platoon
  - Material Support Platoon

Tank brigade mechanized infantry battalions had traditionally been organized around the BMP-1 IFV systems and its variants, as well as the BMP-2. The same modernization and Westernization efforts following the 2022 Russian invasion had also affected these battalions.

Brigade Field Artillery Regiment

- HQ and Target Acquisition Battery
- Recon Battery
- Observer Battery
- SPG Battalion (2x 2S1 Gvozdika)
- Rocket Artillery Battalion (BM-21 Grad)
- Security Company/Battalion

Anti-Tank Battalion (under field artillery regiment, otherwise independent under direct brigade command)

- Headquarters and Headquarters Battery
- 3x/4x Anti-Tank Batteries (towed/self-propelled/MPATS)

Anti-Aircraft and Missile Defense Artillery Battalion/Regiment

- Headquarters and Headquarters Battery
- If for a battalion:
  - 3x Air Defense Batteries (Towed/SPAAG)
  - Air Defense Missile Artillery Battery
  - Man-portable air-defense system Battery
- If for a regiment:
  - Air defense artillery battalion (towed/SPAAG)
  - Air defense missile artillery battalion
  - Man-portable air-defense system Infantry Battery/Battalion

Sniper Company

Recon Company

Combat Engineer Battalion

- HHC
- 3x/4x Combat Engineer Battalions

Maintenance Battalion

Logistics Battalion

Electronic Warfare Company

Radar Company

CBRN Defense Company

Signals Company

Medical Company

Commandant's Platoon

Brigade Band

== Units ==
- 1st Tank Brigade was reformed as 1st Heavy Mechanized Brigade in 2025.
- 3rd Tank Brigade was reformed as 3rd Heavy Mechanized Brigade in 2025.
- 4th Tank Brigade was reformed as 4th Heavy Mechanized Brigade in 2025.
- 5th Tank Brigade was reformed as 5th Heavy Mechanized Brigade in 2024.
- 12th Tank Battalion was reformed as 12th Heavy Mechanized Brigade in 2025.
- 14th Tank Brigade was disbanded in 2019.
- 17th Guards Tank Division was reformed first as 17th Tank Brigade and then as 17th Heavy Mechanized Brigade in 2024.
- 23rd Training Tank Division was disbanded and the 6065th Storage Base since 1987.
- 29th Tank Battalion reformed as 29th Heavy Mechanized Brigade in 2025.
- 30th Guards Tank Division was reformed first as 30th Tank Brigade and then as 30th Mechanised Brigade in 2004.
- 41st Guards Tank Division was disbanded and the 5193rd Storage Base since 1989.
- 42nd Guards Tank Division was disbanded and the 5359th Storage Base since 1990.
- 48th Guards Tank Training Division was reformed as 169th District Training Centre.
- 117th Guards Tank Division was reformed as 119th District Training Centre.

== Equipment ==
- M55S, T-62, T-64, T-72, PT-91 Twardy, T-80, T-84, Challenger 2, Leopard 1, Leopard 2, M1 Abrams, T-90, M-84 main battle tanks in armored battalions
- AMX-10 RC wheeled light tanks/armored reconnaissance vehicles in armored battalions
- FV101 Scorpion tracked light tanks/armored reconnaissance vehicles in armored battalions and reconnaissance battalions
- BMP-1, BMP-2, BVP M-80, AIFV, M2 Bradley and Marder IFV tracked infantry fighting vehicles in tracked mechanized infantry battalions
- BTR-3, BTR-4, KTO Rosomak IFV wheeled infantry fighting vehicles in wheeled mechanized infantry battalions
- BTR-60, BTR-70, BTR-80, VAB, M1117, TAB-71M, Patria Pasi, Pegaso BMR wheeled armored personnel carriers in wheeled mechanized infantry battalions
- MT-LB, GT-MU, M113, FV432, FV105 Sultan, FV430 Bulldog tracked armored personnel carriers in tracked mechanized infantry battalions
- BRDM-2, Fennek armored scout cars, some on tank destroyer configuration
- MT-LB-12 (TD) tracked tank destroyers

== Additional reading ==
- (in Russian) Feskov – V.I. Feskov, K.A. Kalashnikov, V.I. Golikov, The Soviet Army in the Years of the Cold War 1945–91, Tomsk University Publishing House, Tomsk, 2004
- (in Russian) Lenskiy – А. Г. Ленский, Сухопутные силы РККА в предвоенные годы. Справочник. — Санкт-Петербург Б&К, 2000
