= 14th Reconnaissance Squadron =

14th Reconnaissance Squadron may refer to:

- 904th Expeditionary Air Refueling Squadron, designated the '14th Reconnaissance Squadron' (Heavy)' from January 1941 to April 1942
- 14th Fighter Squadron, designated the '14th Reconnaissance Squadron (Photographic)' from November 1947 to June 1949

== See also ==
- 14th Photographic Reconnaissance Squadron
- 14th Tactical Reconnaissance Squadron
