= 14th Tank Brigade =

Ukrainian military unit

- Ukrainian: 14-та окрема танкова бригада
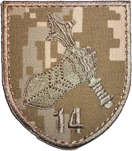
- Active: 2015 – 2019
- Country: Ukraine
- Branch: Ground Forces
- Type: Armoured Forces
- Role: Armoured
- Size: Brigade
- Garrison/HQ: Odesa Oblast
- Equipment: T-64BV

The 14th Tank Brigade (Ukrainian: 14-та окрема танкова бригада) was a reserve armored formation of the Ukrainian Ground Forces. The unit participated in numerous of exercises, mainly near the occupied Crimea, but didn’t take part in any hostilities in the east.

== History ==
=== Formation ===
The brigade was formed in 2015. On 28 December 2015, brigade held readiness exercise and was ready for service.

David Axe, writing for Forbes, suggested that the brigade was inactive in August 2022. The brigade was also not mentioned by President Volodymyr Zelenskyy in his speech on the 200th day of the war.

== Gallery ==
Training exercise 2015

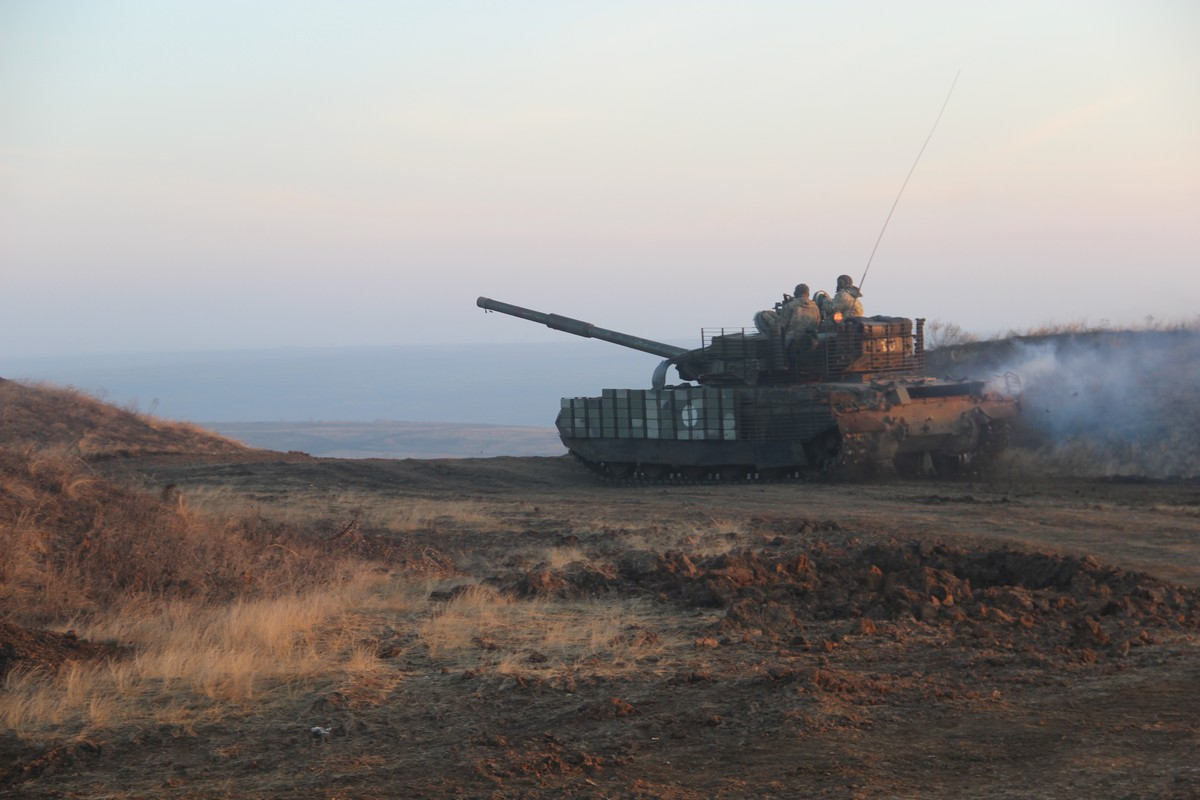

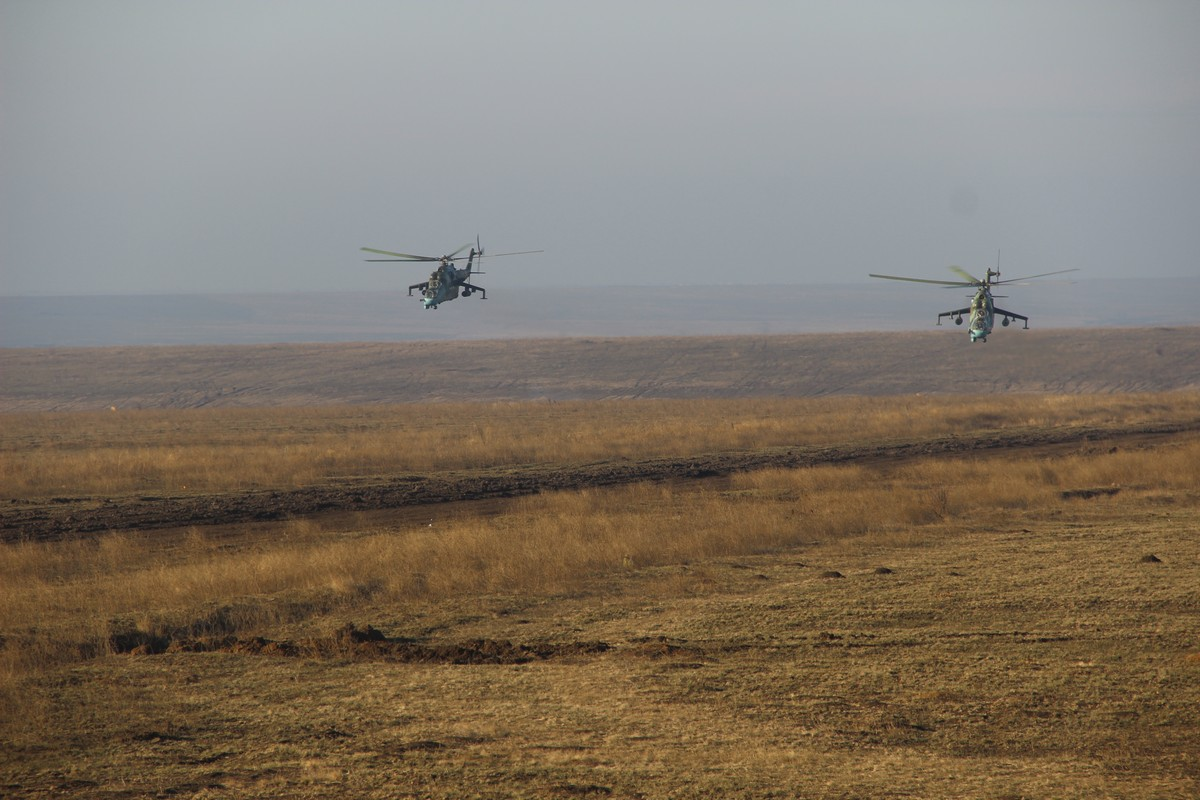

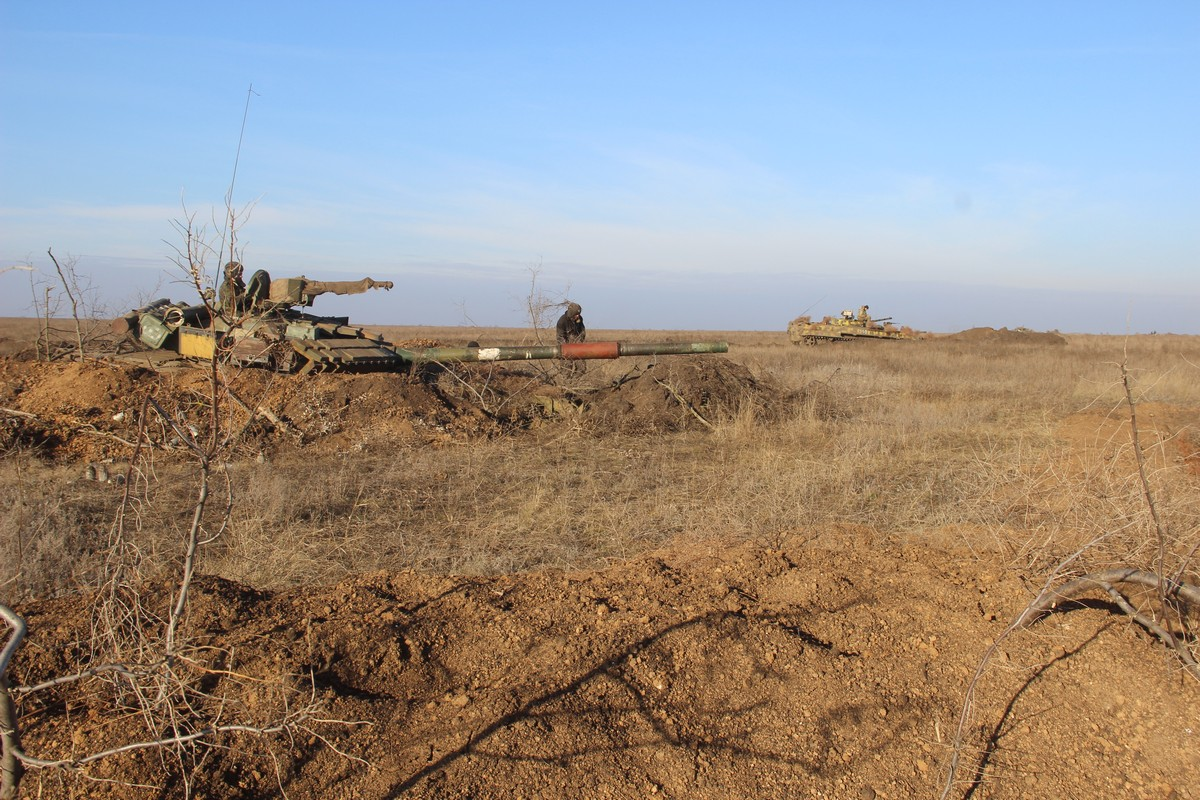

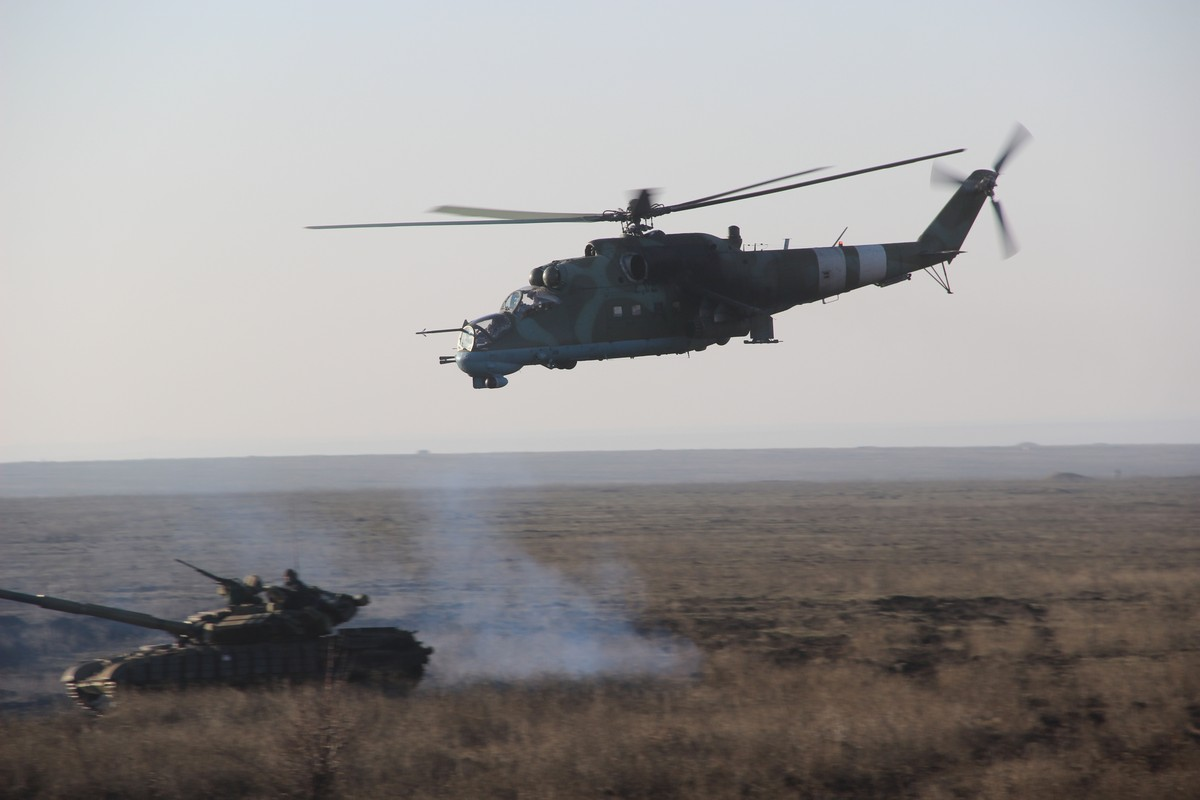
