= 14th (band) =

British electronic music duo

- Origin: London, England
- Genre: Electronic
- Years active: 2010–2012
- Past members: Tracey Duodu; Tom Barber
- Website: 14thmusic.com

14th was an English electronic music duo consisting of Tracey Duodu (vocals) and Tom Barber (production), based in London, England.

Duodu and Barber first met at the University of Sussex while studying. In 2011 they located to London and created 14th. In November 2011, they released their debut EP entitled Hide Yourself. The EP received critical acclaim from The Times, Mixmag, RWD Magazine, Soul Train, and further plaudits from The Guardian Music Blog, Dazed and Confused, Time Out, The Fly and Music Week. Amongst radio performances, they were invited to play a live session at the BBC's Maida Vale studios for Rob Da Bank's flagship Radio 1 show.

In February 2012, they followed their EP release with the single "Take Me There", which received support on BBC Radio 1 and BBC Radio 1Xtra from Annie Mac, MistaJam, Kissy Sell Out, Skream and Benga and earned 14th their first daytime radio plays from Fearne Cotton.

The duo went on to tour the UK, culminating at Club NME at London's KOKO (venue), and played a string of live dates at festivals around Europe over the Summer. After supporting producer and multi-instrumentalist Jakwob on tour, 14th collaborated with him on his EP "The Prize", alongside artists including Ghostpoet, Kano, Mr Hudson and Roses Gabor.

In late 2012, 14th produced a remix of Lana Del Rey track "Ride" which was included on her "Ride Remixes EP" released by Interscope Records.

== Discography ==
=== Extended plays ===
Hide Yourself EP	Released: 2011; Label: Self Released; Formats: CD, digital download

=== Singles ===
- "Take Me There" (2012)
