= 14th Street =

14th Street may refer to several locations in the United States:

- 14th Street (Manhattan), New York City
- 14th Street Northwest and Southwest (Washington, D.C.)
- Broad Street (Philadelphia)
- 14th Street Bridge (Potomac River)
- 14th Street (Hoboken)
- 14th Street Viaduct (Jersey City, New Jersey)
- Fourteenth Street Bridge (Ohio River)

Transit

- New York City Subway stations:
  - 14th Street (IRT Second Avenue Line) (demolished)
  - 14th Street (IRT Third Avenue Line) (demolished)
  - 14th Street (IRT Ninth Avenue Line) (demolished)
  - 14th Street (IRT Sixth Avenue Line); (demolished)
  - 14th Street–Eighth Avenue (New York City Subway), a station complex consisting of:
    - 14th Street (IND Eighth Avenue Line); serving the A, C, and E trains
    - Eighth Avenue (BMT Canarsie Line); the northern terminal of the L train
  - 14th Street/Sixth Avenue (New York City Subway), a station complex consisting of:
    - 14th Street (IND Sixth Avenue Line); serving the F, <F>, and M trains
    - 14th Street (IRT Broadway–Seventh Avenue Line); serving the 1, 2, and 3 trains
    - Sixth Avenue (BMT Canarsie Line); serving the L train
  - 14th Street–Union Square (New York City Subway), a station complex consisting of:
    - 14th Street–Union Square (BMT Broadway Line); serving the N, Q, R, and W trains
    - 14th Street–Union Square (IRT Lexington Avenue Line); serving the 4, 5, 6, and <6> trains
    - Union Square (BMT Canarsie Line); serving the L train
- 14th Street (PATH station); serving the HOB-33, JSQ-33 and JSQ-33 (via HOB) trains

14th Street may also refer to:

- "14th Street", a 2003 song by Rufus Wainwright on his album Want One
- "14th Street", a song written by Emily Spray and more familiarly recorded by Laura Cantrell
- Fourteenth Street Historic District, Washington, D.C.

== See also ==
- 14th Avenue (disambiguation)
- 14th Street Bridge (disambiguation)
