= 419th Unmanned Systems Battalion (Ukraine) =

419th Unmanned Systems "VARTA" Battalion
- Ukrainian: 419 Окремий Батальйон Безпілотних Систем “ВАРТА”
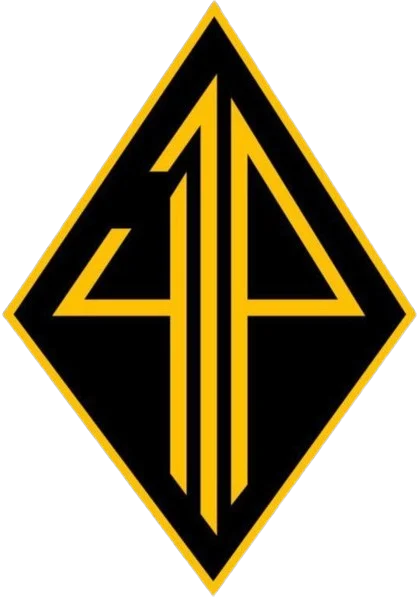
- Insignia
- Active: May 2024–present
- Country: Ukraine
- Allegiance: Ukraine
- Branch: Ukrainian Ground Forces
- Type: Unmanned Systems Forces
- Role: Aerial Reconnaissance, Drone Warfare, FPV drone strikes, Ground Drone Warfare, Cargo Transport
- Size: Battalion
- Nickname: Varta
- Engagements: Russo-Ukrainian war; 2022 Russian invasion of Ukraine

Insignia
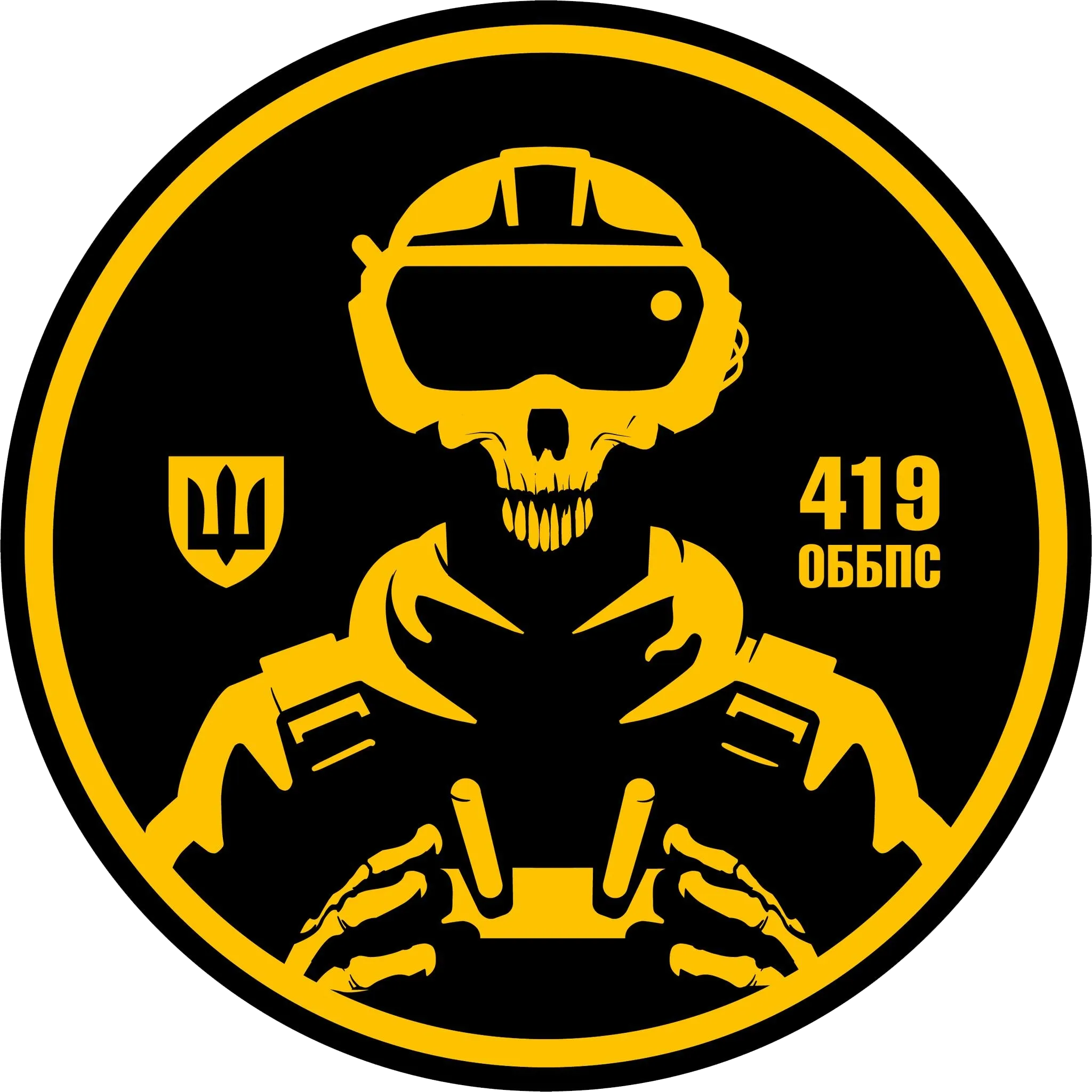
- Former Insignia

The 419th Unmanned Systems "Varta" Battalion (MUN A5027) is a battalion level military unit of the Ground Forces of Ukraine, concerned with drone warfare using aerial and ground unmanned vehicles. It was established in May 2024 and has partaken in combat during the Russian invasion of Ukraine

== History ==
It was established in May 2024 and was undergoing training by the Operational Command West as of June 2024. On 4 January 2025, a soldier of the battalion (Hanushchak Volodymyr Ivanovych) was killed in combat as part of the Eastern Ukraine campaign. On 25 January 2025, the battalion started a recruitment campaign. In March 2025, it received new Aerial Reconnaissance equipment.

== Structure ==
Its structure is as follows:

- Management and Headquarters
- Strike Drone Company "Hunter"
- FPV drone Company
- Bomber drone Company
- Aerial Reconnaissance drone Company
- Unmanned Ground Vehicles Company
- K-19 Group
- Commandant Platoon
- Engineering Platoon
- Communications Platoon
- Material Support Platoon

== Equipment ==
Model	Image	Origin	Type	Number	Notes
Vehicles
Tigr		Russia	Infantry Mobility Vehicle		Captured from Russian forces
Unmanned Aerial Vehicles
Baba Yaga		Ukraine	Bomber drone		
DJI Mavic 3		China	FPV quadcopter		
DJI Matrice 300 RTK		China	FPV multi-rotor drone		
Autel EVO Max 4N		China	FPV quadcopter		
