= 14th Kentucky Cavalry Regiment =

- Active: November 6, 1862 - March 24, 1864
- Country: United States
- Allegiance: Union
- Branch: Cavalry

The 14th Kentucky Cavalry Regiment was a cavalry regiment that served in the Union Army during the American Civil War.

== Service ==
Companies A, B, C, and D of the 14th Kentucky Cavalry Regiment were organized at Mt. Sterling, Kentucky and mustered in for one year on November 6, 1862. The remaining companies were organized at Irvine, Kentucky, on August 21, 1862, and mustered in on February 13, 1863. It mustered in under the command of Colonel Henry C. Lilly.

The regiment was attached to District of Central Kentucky, Department of the Ohio, to June 1863. 2nd Brigade, 4th Division, XXIII Corps, to July 1863. 2nd Brigade, 1st Division, XXIII Corps, to August 1863. District of North Central Kentucky, 1st Division, XXIII Corps, to January 1864. District of Southwest Kentucky to March 1864.

The 14th Kentucky Cavalry mustered out of service beginning September 16, 1863 and ending March 24, 1864.

== Detailed service ==
Assigned to duty scouting in the mountains of eastern Kentucky and operating against guerrillas until January 1864. Oweningville September 19–20, 1862. Brookville September 28. Operations in Bath, Estill, Powell, Clark, Montgomery, and Owsley counties October 16–25. Perry County, Kentucky River, November 8. Johnson County December 1. Floyd County December 4. Powell County December 26, 1862, and January 26, 1863. Mt. Sterling March 22. Slate Creek, near Mt. Sterling, June 11. Mud Lick Springs, Bath County, June 13. Operations against Everett's Raid in eastern Kentucky June 13–23. Triplett's Bridge June 16. Operations against Scott in eastern Kentucky July 25-August 6. Irvine and Estill counties, July 30. Lancaster and Paint Lick Bridge July 31. Lancaster August 1.

== Casualties ==
The regiment lost a total of 80 men during service; 14 enlisted men killed or mortally wounded, 2 officers and 64 enlisted men died of disease.

== Commanders ==
- Colonel Henry C. Lilly

== See also ==
- List of Kentucky Civil War Units
- Kentucky in the Civil War
