= 14th Avenue =

14th Avenue or 14 Av may refer to:

- 14th (VIVA), a station on Viva (bus rapid transit)
- York Regional Road 71
- 14 Av, the fourteenth day of Av, the fifth month of the Hebrew calendar

== See also ==
- 14th Street (disambiguation)
