= 14th Anti-aircraft Missile Brigade =

- 14-та зенітна ракетна бригада
- Unit insignia
- Active: 2022 – present
- Country: Ukraine
- Allegiance: Ukraine
- Branch: Ukrainian Air Force
- Type: Missile
- Role: Anti-Aircraft
- Part of: Air Command Center
- Garrison/HQ: Poltava Oblast
- Nickname: Umansky
- Equipment: MIM-23 Hawk
- Engagements: Russo-Ukrainian war: Russian invasion of Ukraine

Insignia
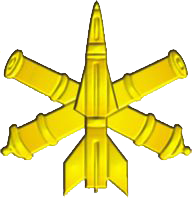
- Collar Insignia

The 14th Anti-aircraft Missile Brigade is a brigade of the Ukrainian Air Force tasked with air defense operations throughout Lviv Oblast and Poltava Oblast. It operates MIM-23 Hawk Missile defense systems amongst other systems and is subordinated to the Air Command Center. It is headquartered at Poltava Oblast.

== History ==
The 14th Anti-aircraft Missile Regiment was established on 25 October 2022 to provide air defense for groupings of troops, critical infrastructure facilities, administrative and industrial centers and other important state facilities in Eastern Ukraine.

The regiment has participated in multiple anti-aircraft engagements securing many victories during the Russian invasion of Ukraine. On 6 December 2023, the Regiment was presented with a combat flag. The regiment used MIM-23 Hawk Missile defense systems, donated by Spain to destroy fourteen cruise missiles and more than forty HESA Shahed 136s.

On 2 August 2024, the regiment was assigned the honorary name of "Umansky".
