= 14th Brigade =

14th Brigade or 14th Infantry Brigade may refer to:

== Australia ==
- 14th Brigade (Australia)

== Bangladesh ==
- 14th Independent Engineers Brigade

== British India ==
- 14th Airlanding Brigade
- 14th Cavalry Brigade (British Indian Army)
- 14th Indian Infantry Brigade

== Hungary ==
- 14th Infantry Brigade (Hungary)

== Japan ==
- 14th Brigade (Japan)
- 14th Mixed Brigade (Imperial Japanese Army)

== New Zealand ==
- 14th Brigade (New Zealand)

== Pakistan ==
- 14th Airlanding Brigade

== Russia ==
- 14th Guards Spetsnaz Brigade
- 14th Separate Guards Artillery Brigade

== Somalia ==
- 14th October Brigade

== Spain ==
- XIV International Brigade

== Turkey ==
- 14th Armored Brigade (Turkey)

== Ukraine ==
- 14th Anti-aircraft Missile Brigade (Ukraine)
- 14th Chervona Kalyna Brigade
- 14th Mechanized Brigade (Ukraine)
- 14th Radio Technical Brigade (Ukraine)
- 14th Tank Brigade (Ukraine)

== United Kingdom ==
- 14th Infantry Brigade (United Kingdom)
- 14th Mounted Brigade
- 14th Reserve Brigade

=== Artillery units ===
- 14th Brigade Royal Field Artillery, a unit of the British Expeditionary Force of 1914
- 14th (London) Medium Brigade, Royal Garrison Artillery
- XIV Brigade, Royal Horse Artillery

== United States ==
- 14th Military Police Brigade

== See also ==
- 14th Regiment (disambiguation)
- 14th Division (disambiguation)
