= 14th Division =

14th Division may refer to:

== Infantry divisions ==
- 14th Infantry Division (Belgium)
- 14th Infantry Division (France)
- 14th Military Division, Vichy France
- 14th Division (German Empire)
- 14th Infantry Division (Wehrmacht), Germany
- 14th Landwehr Division (German Empire)
- 14th Landwehr Division (Wehrmacht), Germany
- 14th Luftwaffe Field Division, Wehrmacht, Germany
- 14th Panzergrenadier Division, Bundeswehr, Germany
- 14th Reserve Division, German Empire
- 14th Waffen Grenadier Division of the SS (1st Galician), Germany
- 14th Infantry Division (Greece)
- 14th Indian Division, British Indian Army division during World War I
- 14th Indian Infantry Division, British Indian Army division during World War II
- 14th Imam Hossein Division, Iran
- 14th Infantry Division "Isonzo", Kingdom of Italy
- 14th Division (Imperial Japanese Army)
- 14th Infantry Division (Poland)
- 14th Infantry Division (Russian Empire)
- 14th Guards Airborne Division, Soviet Union (1943), redesignated 99th Guards Rifle Division in 1944
- 14th Guards Airborne Division, Soviet Union (1944), later the 114th Guards Airborne Division
- 14th Guards Mechanized Division, later the 14th Guards Motor Rifle Division, Soviet Union
- 14th Guards Rifle Division, Soviet Union
- 14th Mechanized Division, Soviet Union
- 14th Rifle Division (Soviet Union, 1922–1944)
- 14th Rifle Division (Soviet Union, 1955–1957)
- 14th Division (Spain)
- 14th Army Division, Sweden
- 14th (Light) Division, British Army division during World War I
- 14th Infantry Division (United States)
- 14th Division (Yugoslav Partisans), 1943–1945

== Armoured divisions ==
- 14th Tank Division (Czechoslovakia)
- 14th Panzer Division, Germany
- 14th Guards Heavy Tank Division, Soviet Union
- 14th Tank Division (Soviet Union, 1940–1941)
- 14th Tank Division (Soviet Union, 1974–1989)
- 14th Armored Division (United States)

== Cavalry divisions ==
- 14th Cavalry Division (Russian Empire)
- 14th Cavalry Division (Soviet Union)

== Other divisions ==
- 14th Fighter Division, People's Republic of China
- 14th Rocket Division, Russia/Soviet Union
- 14th Railway Facilities Protection Division NKVD, Soviet Union
- 14th Special Forces Division, Syria
- 14th Air Division, United States
- 14th Air Division (Provisional), United States, Gulf War

== Non-military divisions ==
- 14th Canadian Administrative Division

== See also ==
- 14th Army (disambiguation)
- XIV Corps (disambiguation)
- 14th Brigade (disambiguation)
- 14th Regiment (disambiguation)
- 14th Battalion (disambiguation)
- 14 Squadron (disambiguation)
