= 14th Regiment =

14th Regiment or 14th Infantry Regiment may refer to:

- 2nd/14th Light Horse Regiment, a unit of the Australian Army
- 14th Air Defence Artillery Regiment (Belgium), a unit of the Belgian Army
- 14th Alpini Regiment, a unit of the Italian Army
- 14th Regiment Royal Artillery, a unit of the British Army
- 14th (Buckinghamshire) Regiment of Foot, a unit of the British Army
- 14th Unmanned Aerial Vehicle Regiment (Ukraine), a unit of Ukraine's Unmanned Systems Forces
- 14th Infantry Regiment (USAFIP-NL), part of United States Army Forces in the Philippines – Northern Luzon
- 14th Infantry Regiment (United States), a unit of the United States Army
- 14th Cavalry Regiment, a unit of the United States Army
- 14th Continental Regiment, a unit which fought in the American Revolutionary War for secession from the British Empire
- 14th Marine Regiment (United States), a unit of the United States Marine Corps

== American Civil War regiments ==
- 14th Alabama Infantry Regiment, a unit of the Confederate (South) Army

=== Union (North) Army ===
- 14th Indiana Infantry Regiment
- 14th Illinois Infantry Regiment
- 14th Illinois Cavalry Regiment
- 14th Iowa Infantry Regiment
- 14th Maine Infantry Regiment
- 14th Michigan Infantry Regiment
- 14th Michigan Infantry Regiment
- 14th Regiment (New York State Militia)
- 14th West Virginia Infantry Regiment
- 14th Wisconsin Infantry Regiment

== See also ==
- 14th Brigade (disambiguation)
- 14th Division (disambiguation)
