= 14 Squadron =

14 Squadron or 14th Squadron may refer to:

- No. 14 Squadron IAF, a unit of the Indian Air Force
- No. 14 Squadron (Finland), a unit of the Finnish Air Force
- No. 14 Squadron PAF, a unit of the Pakistan Air Force
- No. 14 Squadron RAAF, a unit of the Royal Australian Air Force
- No. 14 Squadron RAF, a unit of the Royal Air Force, United Kingdom
- No. 14 Squadron RJAF, a unit of the Royal Jordanian Air Force
- No. 14 Squadron RNZAF, a unit of the Royal New Zealand Air Force
- No. 14 Squadron RSAF, a unit of the Royal Saudi Air Force
- No. 14 Squadron SLAF, a unit of the Sri Lanka Air Force
- 14 Squadron SAAF, a unit of the South African Air Force
- 14th Air Squadron, a unit of the Indonesian Air Force
- 14th Airlift Squadron, a unit of the United States Air Force
- 14th Antisubmarine Squadron, a unit of the United States Army Air Forces
- 14th Bombardment Squadron, a unit of the United States Army Air Forces
- 14th Fighter Squadron, a unit of the United States Air Force
- 14th Fighter-Interceptor Squadron, a unit of the United States Air Force
- 14th Reconnaissance Squadron (disambiguation), units of the United States Air Force
- 14th Test Squadron, a unit of the United States Air Force
- 14th Weapons Squadron, a unit of the United States Air Force
- Air Warning Squadron 14, a unit of the United States Marine Corps
- Destroyer Squadron 14, a unit of the United States Navy
- Marine Aviation Logistics Squadron 14, a unit of the United States Marine Corps
- HM-14 (Helicopter Mine Countermeasures Squadron 14), a unit of the United States Navy
- HSC-14 (Helicopter Sea Combat Squadron 14), a unit of the United States Navy
- RVAH-14 (Reconnaissance Attack (Heavy) Squadron), a unit of the United States Navy
- VFA-14 (Strike Fighter Squadron 14), a unit of the United States Navy
- VP-14 (Patrol Squadron 14), a unit of the United States Navy
