= Luckett & Farley =

American architecture, engineering, and interior design firm

- Type: Incorporated, 100% ESOP
- Industry: Architecture; engineering; interior design; procurement; development
- Founded: 1853
- Headquarters: Louisville, Kentucky, US
- Key people: Rolf Provan (President & CEO); Jeff Moneypenny (SVP); Pat Castelli (VP)
- Number of employees: 118
- Website: www.luckett-farley.com

Luckett & Farley is an architecture, engineering, and interior design firm based in Louisville, Kentucky. It was founded in 1853, making it (along with SmithGroup) the oldest continually operating architecture firm in the United States that is not a wholly owned subsidiary. The firm began under the name Rogers, Whitestone & Co., Architects, changing its name to Henry Whitestone in 1857, to D.X. Murphy & Brother in 1890, and to Luckett & Farley in 1962. The company is 100% employee-owned as of January 1, 2012 and concentrates on automotive, industrial, federal government, higher education, health and wellness, and corporate/commercial markets. There are more LEED professionals at Luckett & Farley than any other company in Kentucky with 50, as of December 2012.

== History ==
=== The Whitestone period ===
Henry Whitestone (1819–1893) was born at Clondegad House in County Clare, Ireland. He immigrated to the United States amidst famine and depression with his wife Henrietta in January 1852 from Innis, Ireland after he was recommended to Isaiah Rogers (1800–1869), for his work on the County Clare Courthouse. Rogers was an architect based in Cincinnati who came to be known as "the father of the American hotel". Whitestone's first project with Rogers was the Frankfort Hotel in Frankfort, Kentucky and a partnership formed in November 1853 when Rogers was contracted to rebuild the recently burned Louisville Hotel. Whitestone moved from Frankfort to Louisville and received 2/5 of all profits from the services he performed with Rogers.

The first office of Isaiah Rogers and Henry Whitestone was located at Bullit and Main Streets, near where the Riverfront Plaza/Belvedere is located today. Together they transformed Louisville into a "five-story city" and introduced the Italianate architectural style to the region. Whitestone separated from Rogers in 1857 and soon became the preeminent architecture firm in Louisville through the 1880s. Notably, Charles J. Clarke worked for Henry Whitestone during the Civil War and later formed a partnership with Arthur Loomis, to form the historically significant Louisville architecture firm Clarke and Loomis.

Whitestone retired in approximately 1881 and died in 1893. An 1893 publishing of The American Architect and Building News wrote of Whitestone,

...forty years ago, in the prime of life, he was in the active practice of his profession, erecting buildings in that perennial style of Italian Renaissance, of which he was a master, and from which he was never lured by passing fashion.

He is buried at Cave Hill Cemetery in Louisville Kentucky alongside his wife and two daughters (Section C, lot 39). A marker located on Main St., across from the old Louisville Hotel, bears his name.

=== The D.X. Murphy era ===
Dennis Xavier ("D.X.") Murphy (1853–1933) was born in Louisville after his parents immigrated from Ireland, began working as a draftsman at age 16 for Henry Whitestone. By 1874 he was the head draftsman and eventually took over the practice in 1880 just before Whitestone's retirement. It was at this point that the firm was renamed D.X. Murphy. His brothers James C. Murphy (1865–1935), later joined the practice in 1890 at which time the firm became D.X. Murphy and Brother. Their younger brother Peter C. Murphy subsequently joined and together they designed many of Louisville's Catholic Churches, among many other notable buildings, for significantly reduced fees on the order of 1% of construction costs. The Murphys' sister, Sr. Mary Anselm, was a nun with the Sisters of Charity of Nazareth in Bardstown, Kentucky which likely led to many of the commissionings.

The firm's most famous work was that of the Twin Spires at Churchill Downs in 1895, designed by 24-year-old Joseph D. Baldez and constructed in time for the 21st Kentucky Derby.

It was known for the grandstand (as well as the spires) of Churchill Downs, the Galt House Hotel and distillery buildings along what became Louisville's Whiskey Row, and numerous other office buildings, schools, hospitals, and churches, some of which survive and are listed on the National Register of Historic Places (NRHP) for their architecture.

Works include:

- Galt House Hotel
- Bernheim Distillery (c.1896)
- Combined Distillers of Kentucky (c.1905–1906)
- Bonnie Brothers Distillery (c.1903–1912)
- The Phil. Hollenbach Company (c.1889), 528 Main, which in 2023 was home of the Evan Williams Bourbon Experience
- Cathedral of the Assumption (1852), 443 S. 5th St. Louisville, KY (Keely, William; Murphy, D.X.) Gothic Revival. NRHP-listed
- Churchill Downs, 700 Central Ave. Louisville, KY (Murphy, D.X. & Co.), NRHP-listed
- Inter-Southern Insurance Building (1913), 239–247 S. 5th St. Louisville, KY (with Brinton B. Davis), NRHP-listed
- Jefferson Branch Louisville Free Public Library, 1718 W. Jefferson St. Louisville, KY, NRHP-listed
- Jefferson County Jail, 514 W. Liberty St. Louisville, KY, NRHP-listed
- Kentucky Wagon Works, 2601 S. 3rd St. Louisville, KY, NRHP-listed
- National Tobacco Works Branch Stemmery, 2410-18 W. Main St., Louisville, NRHP-listed
- National Tobacco Works Branch Drying House, 2400 W. Main St., Louisville, NRHP-listed
- Presentation Academy, 861 S. 4th St., Louisville, NRHP-listed
- Snead Manufacturing Building, 817 W. Market St., Louisville, NRHP-listed
- Stockyard Exchange Building (1914), Louisville, Beaux Arts, in NRHP-listed Butchertown Historic District
- One or more works in Savoy Historic District, 209–221 W. Jefferson St., Louisville, NRHP-listed

Dennis Murphy died in 1933 and is buried at St. Louis Cemetery in Louisville.

In 1935 D.X. Murphy and Brother was sold by James Murphy's wife to D.X. Murphy and Brother Incorporated for a sum of $1,147, at which time Peter Murphy became president. By 1943, Peter Murphy was named chairman of the board and William G. O'Toole became president. Thomas D. Luckett II (1909–1996) became majority stakeholder in the firm upon O'Toole's passing in 1956 while Jean D. Farley (b. 1927) was named Vice President.

D.X. Murphy and Bro., Inc became Luckett & Farley, Inc on May 25, 1962, with T.D. Luckett and J.D. Farley sharing ownership.

D.X. Murphy occupied the old Louisville Trust Building (208 S. 5th St) until 1962 when the office was relocated to the Washington Building (4th and Market), which has since been demolished.

The Filson Historical Society in Louisville holds architectural drawings and other records of the D.X. Murphy and Brother firm and its predecessors.

=== Luckett & Farley ===
By the time the firm was renamed Luckett & Farley Inc. in 1962 to reflect the change of ownership, civil and structural engineering services were also provided; Mechanical and electrical engineering services were added in 1970 in order to deliver better-coordinated construction documents to clients. By 1973 the firm name was changed to Luckett & Farley Architects, Engineers, and Construction Managers, Inc. and by the end of 1982, Jean Farley sold the company to Dennis Dewitt, Ronald Kendall, and Douglas Wilkerson.

In 2000 an employee stock ownership plan (ESOP) was formed and by 2002, leadership was transferred to Ed Jerdonek, Belinda Gates, Gail Miller, and Rob Diamond. A design-build subsidiary, LFDB, was created in 1999 but has since separated with the company as of 2011. Belinda Gates retired from Luckett & Farley in 2010. On January 1, 2012, Jerdonek, Miller, and Diamond sold their interest in the company to the employee-owners, making Luckett & Farley 100% employee-owned. Luckett & Farley occupied the Washington Building from 1963 to 1968 when it moved to 215 W. Breckinridge and again in 1997 to their current location in the Prince Wells Building at 737 S. Third St.

Luckett & Farley uses building information modeling technology to produce its drawings.

== Departments ==
Departments consist of the following fields:

- Architecture
- Interior Design & Procurement
- Structural Engineering
- Civil Engineering
- Mechanical Engineering
- Electrical Engineering
- Building Commissioning

== Presidents ==
Generation	Name	End of Term
1	Isaiah Rogers	1857
2	Henry Whitestone	1880
3	Dennis X. Murphy	1933?
4	James C. Murphy	1935
5	Peter C. Murphy	1943
6	William O'Toole	1956
7	Thomas D. (T.D.) Luckett II	1971
8	Jean D. Farley	1982
9	Dennis DeWitt	2002
10	Ed Jerdonek	2016
11	Aric M. Andrew	2021
12	Rolf Provan	Present

== Rogers & Whitestone's work in Louisville (1853–1880) ==
No.	Building Name	Year Constructed	Location	Still Standing?	Reference
1	Louisville Hotel	1853	610 W. Main St.	No	
2	Barber-Barbour House; Rosewell	1854	6415 Transylvania Ave	Yes	
3	Hunt-Hite Residence; Pendennis Club	1854	NW 2nd/Walnut	No	
4	Newcomb Alexander Banking Building	1854	NW Main/Bullitt (across BB&T Bldg.)	No	
5	T.T. Shreve Residence	1854	606 S. Walnut	No	
6	The Galt House (Addition and Renovation)	1854	1st/Main	No	
7	Monsarrat Fifth Ward Building	1855	5th/York	Yes	
8	Col. Rueben Durrett Residence; The Filson Club; Home of the Innocents	1856	202 E. Chestnut	No	
9	Richardson Burge Villa	1856	NW 7th/Main	No	
10	Store; Seelbach European Hotel; The Old Inn	1856	SW 6th/Main	Yes	
11	Richard Atkinson Residence	1857	SE 4th/Walnut	No	
12	Louisville Medical Institute	1857	SW 8th/Chesnut	No	
13	Cathedral of the Assumption Tower & Spire	1858	433 S. 5th	Yes	
14	Horatio Dalton Newcomb, St. Xavier College	1859	118 W. Broadway	No	
15	James C. Ford Residence; YMCA	1859	2nd/Broadway	No	
16	Cook House	1860	1348 S. 3rd	Yes	
17	James Irvin Residence	1860	2910 Northwestern	Yes	
18	William A. Richardson's Ivywood	1860	3000 Dundee Rd	No	
19	Baurman House	1866	1518 W. Market	Yes	
20	John G. Baxter House; House of Refuge	1866	2035 S. 3rd	No	
21	A.J. Ballard House	1867	NW Floyd/Walnut	No	
22	Irvin Mausoleum	1867	Cave Hill Cemetery	Yes	
23	Peterson–Dumesnil House	1869	301 S. Peterson	Yes	
24	The Bridgeford-Monfort Home	1869	413 W. Broadway	No	
25	The Galt House (2nd)	1869	1st/Main	No	
26	Beckurt-B.F. Guthrie Residence	1870	Unknown	--	
27	Ronald–Brennan House	1870	631 S. 5th	Yes	
28	Weissinger-Chambers Residence	1870	402 Ormsby	No	
29	Tompkins-Buchanan-Rankin House; Nazareth College; Spalding University	1871	851 S. 4th	Yes	
30	Landward House (Robinson-Wheeler Residence)	1872	1385 S. 4th	Yes	
31	Silas F. Miller House	1872	119 W. Broadway	No	
32	Lithgow Building; Louisville Board of Trade	1873	301 W. Main	No	
33	Woodford H. Dulaney Residence	1872	SE 8th/Broadway	No	
34	Bashford Manor Stable	1874	2040 Bashford Manor/Adele	No	
35	Salve-Bullett Mausoleum	1875	Cave Hill Cemetery	Yes	
36	City Hall Clock Tower Replacement	1876	601 W. Jefferson	Yes	
37	James Henning Residence	1877	408 Ormsby	Yes	
38	Louisville & Nashville Railroad Office Building; Whiskey Row Lofts	1877	133 W. Main	Yes	
39	Charles Merriwether House	1878	3rd St.	Yes	
40	Kentucky Wagon Works; KY Mfg. Co.	1878	2601 S. 3rd	No	
41	Standiford Residence; School for Girls	1880	West side of 4th, between Breckinridge/Kentucky	No	
42	Portland Federal Savings and Loan Bldg.	1887	539 W. Market	Yes	
43	U.S. Custom House and Post Office (Supervising Architect)	1865–1881	3rd/Liberty	No	
44	105, 107–109, 111 W. Main ("Whiskey Row")	1877, 1905, 1871	105, 107–109, 111 W. Main	Yes	

== Partial list of work by D.X. Murphy & Brother in Louisville (1880–1933) ==
No.	Building Name	Year Constructed	Location	Still Standing?	Reference
1	Louisville Railway Co. Car Barn	1883	SE 27th/Chesnut	Yes	
2	Engelhard School	1886	119 E. Kentucky	Yes	
3	St. Vincent de Paul Church	1886	1202 S. Shelby	Yes	
4	Louisville City School Building	1888	22ndMagazine	Yes	
5	Presentation Academy	1893	861 S. 4th	Yes	
6	Churchill Downs Twin Spires	1895	9th/Central	Yes	
7	St. Martin School	1896	Shelby/Gray	Yes	
8	National Tobacco Work Branch Stemmery; Custom Mfg. Service	1898	2400–2418 W. Main	Yes	
9	St. Boniface Catholic Church, rectory, and hall	1899	531 E. Liberty	Yes	
10	St. Anthony Medical Center	1901	St. Anthony/Barrett	Yes	
11	St. William Church	1901	13th/Oak	Yes	
12	Basil Doerhoefer Residence	1902	4432 W. Broadway	Yes	
13	Joseph B. Atkinson Elementary School	1902	28th/Duncan	No	
14	Jefferson County Jail	1905	514 W. Liberty	Yes	
15	Bonavita-Weller Residence	1906	12006 Ridge Rd.	Yes	
16	St. Agnes Church	1906	1920 Newburg	Yes	
17	Victoria Hotel	1907	10th/Broadway	No	
18	Peter C. Doerhoefer Residence	1908	4422 W. Broadway	Yes	
19	Snead Building (Glassworks)	1909	815 W. Market	Yes	
20	Zinsmeister & Bro. Building	1910	14th/Jefferson	Yes	
21	Tyler Hotel: Addition and Expansion	1911	323–345 W. Jefferson	No	
22	Bardstown Rd. Presbyterian Church	1912	1722 Bardstown Rd.	Yes	
23	Louisville Free Public Library	1913	1718 W. Jefferson	Yes	
24	Alamo Theater; Ohio Theater	1914	444 S. 4th	No	
25	German Bank, Louisville National Bank	1914	5th/Market	Yes	
26	Louisville Hospital	1914	323 E. Chesnut	Yes	
27	Stock Yard Exchange Buildings	1914	Main/Johnson	Yes	Beaux Arts
28	St. Patrick's School (Adjacent to Church)	1915	13th/Market	Yes	
29	St. Patrick's Parochial School	1916	1524 W. Market	Yes	
30	Glencoe Co. Warehouse; Bluegrass Distillery	1920	26th/Broadway	Yes	
31	Ahrens School; Educational Resource Center	1922	546 S. 1st	Yes	
32	Henry Vogt Machine Building	1922	10th/Ormsby	Yes	
33	Home Life Building Addition; Heyburn Building	1922	239 S. 5th	Yes	
34	Office Building	1922	3rd/Breckinridge	Yes	
35	St. Agnes Sanitorium; Our Lady of Peace	1923	Newburg Way	Yes	
36	Waverly Hills Sanatorium	1926	4400 Paralee Lane	Yes	
37	Grotto and Garden of Our Lady of Lourdes at St. Joseph's Infirmary	1927	James Guthrie Ct.	Yes	
38	St. Cecilia Church and School	1927	25th/Slevin	Yes	
39	St. Phillip Neri School and Rectory	1927	Woodbine/Floyd	Yes	
40	Commonwealth Life Building	1928	NW 4th/Broadway	No	
41	O.K. Storage	1929	Barrett/Broadway	Yes	
42	Bishop Floersh Residence	1931	1118 S. 3rd	Yes	
43	University of Louisville School of Medicine Additions	1937	550–554 1st	Yes	
44	U.S. Custom House and Post Office (Supervising Architect)	1880s	4th/Chestnut	No	
45	American Tobacco Complex	1920 s	30th–32nd/Madison	No	

== Awards ==
- Luckett & Farley has been awarded one of Kentucky's best places to work in 2009, 2010, 2011, 2012, 2013, 2014 and 2015.
- In 2012, it was named one of Louisville's best places to work by The Courier-Journal.
- In 2014, Luckett & Farley was awarded the 2014 ESOP Company of the Year by the Ohio/Kentucky ESOP Association Chapter
