= Louisville Glassworks =

- Snead Manufacturing Building
- U.S. National Register of Historic Places
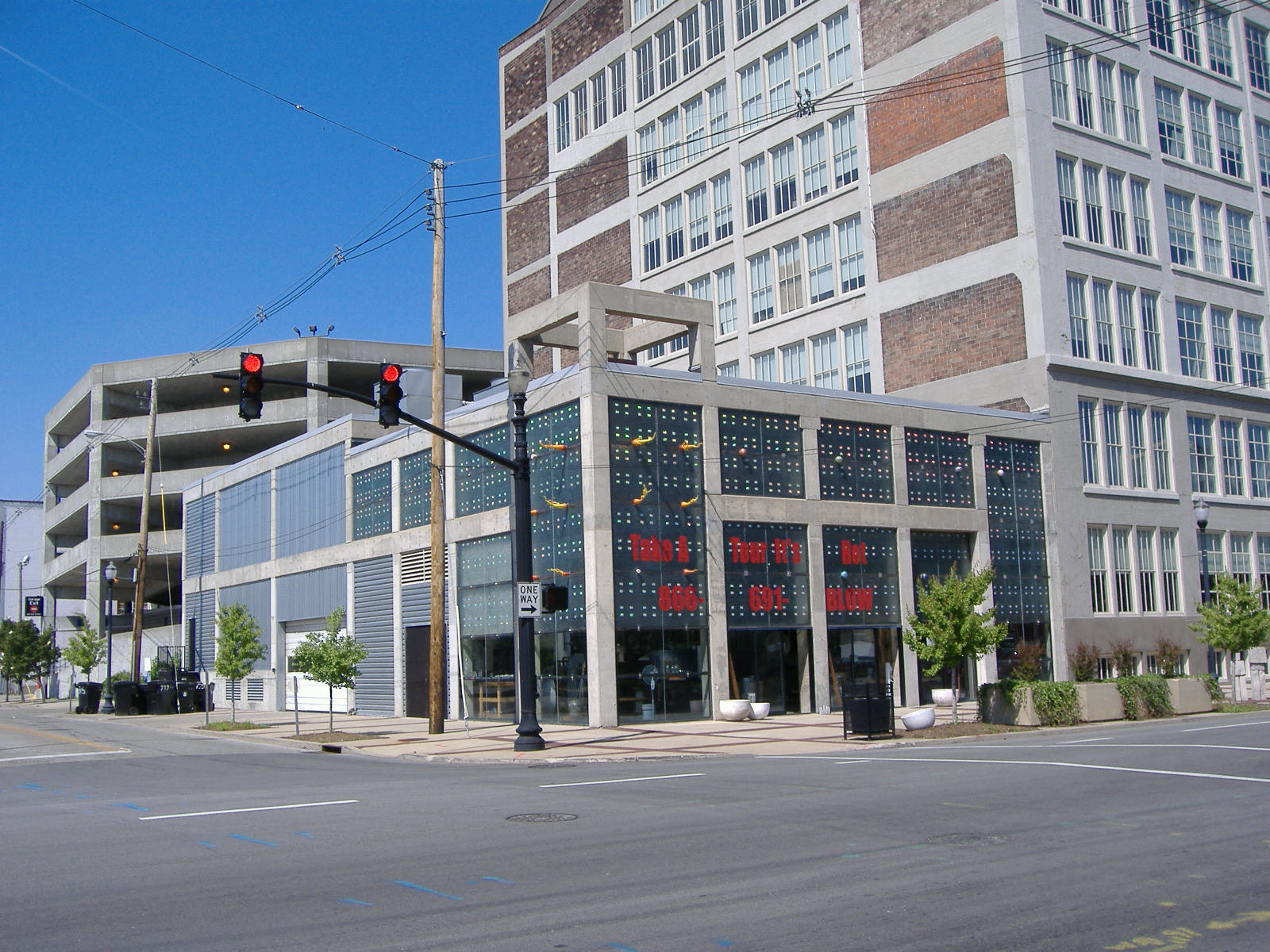
- Louisville Glassworks in 2007
- Location: Louisville, KY
- Coordinates: 38°15′22.41″N 85°45′51.78″W
- Built: 1910
- Architect: D.X. Murphy & Brothers
- NRHP reference No.: 78001367
- Added to NRHP: August 1, 1978

The Snead Building located at 815 W. Market St. is a multi-use facility housing two working glass studios (two glass galleries): a Walk-In Workshop and tours by appointment.

== History ==
From 1850 to 1901, at least seven different glass manufacturing factories operated in Louisville. Six were utilitarian bottle houses, and the other manufactured window and plate glass. In 1850 the first glass bottle and jar-making firm, known as the Kentucky Glass Works was formed, which, by 1855, was being referred to under the name "Louisville Glass Works". ("Louisville KY Glass Works" is the actual wording on some of their embossed whiskey flasks of the 1850s and 1860s era). That bottle making firm was located on the southeast corner of Franklin and Clay Streets. However, that firm was defunct by 1873, and bears no relationship to the much later glassmaking business that operated in the old Sneath building under the name "Louisville Glassworks".

In 1896 Edwin Penna began operation, and has gone under five generations of Penna ownership.

The downtown location has historically been known as the Snead Manufacturing Building, and was put on the National Register in 1978. Snead was responsible for building many iron buildings around the country, including on Louisville's "Whiskey Row" on Main Street, and supplied the decorative ironworks for the State, Navy and War Building in Washington, DC. After the old building burnt down, the architect was told to build a "first-class fireproof power building".

The Louisville Glassworks business closed its doors in 2012, but glass continues there today.

Since 2012, The Louisville Glassworks building has been home to Flame Run Glass Studio and Gallery, who relocated there from their previous location in the NuLu district, and also the home of the Mark Payton Glass Center, The Foundry at Glassworks, and various other businesses on the top floors.

The Glassworks building still boasts one of the largest privately owned hot glass studios in the country, and a nationally recognized glass art gallery which showcases artists from across the globe.

== See also ==
- List of attractions and events in the Louisville metropolitan area
