= National Tobacco Works Branch Stemmery =

- U.S. National Register of Historic Places
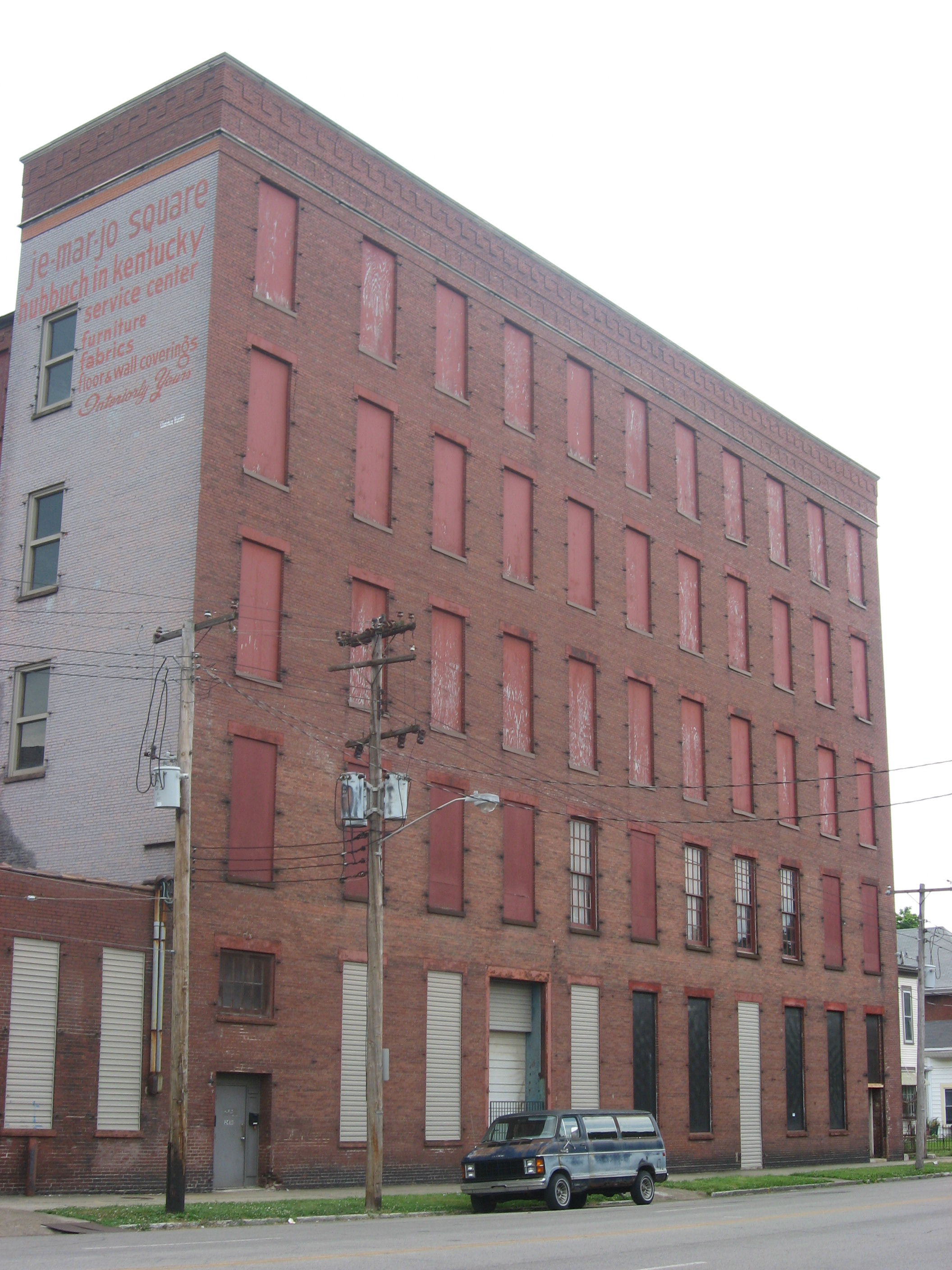

- Location within Kentucky
- Location: 2410-18 W. Main St., Louisville, Kentucky
- Coordinates: 38°15′35″N 85°46′41″W
- Area: 1.2 acres (0.49 ha)
- Built: 1898
- Architect: D.X. Murphy & Bros.
- MPS: West Louisville MRA
- NRHP reference No.: 83002709
- Added to NRHP: September 8, 1983

The National Tobacco Works Branch Stemmery is a stemmery in Louisville, Kentucky, located at 2410-18 W. Main St. It was built in 1898 and was listed on the National Register of Historic Places in 1983.

The building was designed by D.X. Murphy & Brothers; D.X. Murphy also designed the Jefferson County Jail (Louisville, Kentucky) and the Jefferson Branch Library.

It was part of Louisville's National Tobacco Works, a large manufacturer of chewing tobacco.

It was later the Hubbuch In Kentucky Service Center.

== See also ==
- National Tobacco Works, also NRHP-listed in Louisville
- National Tobacco Works Branch Drying House, also NRHP-listed in Louisville
