= Larus and Brother Company =

Tobacco company in Richmond, Virginia, US

Coordinates: 37°31′51.49″N 77°25′29.76″W

- Industry: Tobacco, media, charcoal
- Predecessor: Harris Tobacco Company
- Founded: 1877 (149 years ago)
- Founder: Charles D. Larus and Herbert C. Larus
- Defunct: June 10, 1968
- Fate: Dissolved
- Successor: Larus Investing Company
- Headquarters: 7 Twenty-first Street, Richmond, Virginia, United States
- Products: Tobacco, charcoal

Larus and Brother Company (1877–1968) was a diversified tobacco company headquartered in Richmond, Virginia. The company manufactured pipe tobacco, cigarettes, and charcoal. It also operated local radio and television stations.

== History ==
Charles D. Larus and Herbert C. Larus purchased the Richmond-based Harris Tobacco Company and founded Larus and Brother Company in 1877. They manufactured pipe and chewing tobacco. In 1882, Herbert Clinton Larus died and William Thomas Reed, his nephew, became the company's partner and general manager. For the rest of its history, the company was led by members of the Reed and Larus families.

The company was dissolved on June 10, 1968. Larus Investing Company, a holding company, was established for the tobacco and media businesses. The tobacco subsidiary, Larus and Brother Company, was sold later that year. In 1969, the last media subsidiary was sold. The Virginia Historical Society holds Larus and Brother Company records at the Reynolds Business History Center.

== Industries ==
=== Tobacco ===
From 1878 to 1897, the company relied on prison labor at the Virginia State Penitentiary. After that, it operated for more than 75 years on Twenty-first Street (along Tobacco Row) in Richmond. Larus and Brother Company incorporated in 1900. By 1901, the company's workers were represented by the Tobacco Workers International Union (TWIU). (Note: Prior to the change in unions in 1942, black and white workers were both represented by the Tobacco Workers International Union in segregated locals.)

Edgeworth tobacco products were introduced in 1903 and became the best selling pipe tobacco in its price class. Edgeworth Sliced tobacco was the first pipe tobacco product to be advertised nationally. Broken into smaller pieces, Edgeworth Ready-Rubbed was introduced in 1912.

The company began to manufacture cigarettes after it purchased the Reed Tobacco Company and adopted it as a subsidiary in 1913. Distribution companies were opened in San Francisco and Boston in the early 1930s. In 1935, Larus bought the plug tobacco plant, Sparrow and Graveley of Martinsville, Virginia, which was closed in 1942 because it was unprofitable. The plug tobacco operations were transferred to Richmond. Holiday, the aromatic smoking tobacco company, was purchased in 1942. Holiday and Edgeworth were Larus' best selling products. The company's tobacco supply went to the United States Army and aid agencies during World War I and II. Packets of four cigarettes were labeled with the words, "I Shall Return", and distributed secretly in the Philippines.

The company hired both white and black workers, who were segregated based upon the type of work. African-Americans, primarily women, worked in the stemmery and on the third floor; they performed the most difficult and labor-intensive work. White women worked on the main floor. Black women earned 20 to 25 cents less per hour in 1942 and were unable to apply for the higher paid positions performed by white women. In 1942, the United Cannery, Agricultural, Packing, and Allied Workers of America union organized the third-floor manufacturing and stemmery workers at Larus and Brother. The Fair Employment Practice Committee (FEPC) was brought in to investigate whether there were discriminatory practices in 1942, but dropped the case. Although the pay scale was still inequitable, black workers received a pay increase in 1944. (Note: White workers had gone on strike in 1941, and black workers initially would not cross the picket line due to concern for their safety. The black workers returned to their job because there was no strike fund to help replace lost wages and they received pressure to return to their jobs by the company. After three weeks, the white workers won a 5 cent per hour increase in pay.) By 1944, the TWIU represented both black and white workers with segregated locals, which was challenged as a biased practice by the American Civil Liberties Union. The following year, the National Labor Relations Board (NLRB) and the Regional War Labor Board required the union to allow black workers to join the white workers' local.

As more people began to smoke cigarettes, the company's profits from pipe tobacco began to decline and the company sought to diversify. Larus and Brother Company, the tobacco subsidiary of Larus Investing Company, was sold to Rothman's of Canada, Limited on October 18, 1968.

=== Media ===
Larus branched out into broadcasting when WRVA radio signed on from Richmond on November 2, 1925. WRVA-TV, a television station, was established in 1956 by Richmond Television Corporation, a consortium in which Larus held controlling interest. The television station was sold to Jefferson Standard Broadcasting Company of Charlotte, North Carolina in 1968. The AM and FM radio stations were sold in 1969 to the Southern Broadcasting Company of Winston-Salem, North Carolina.

=== Charcoal ===
The company operated a charcoal plant in 1960 after purchasing Charcoal Industries, Inc. Four years later, the charcoal plant closed; it was called the Terrace Products Company.
