= American Tobacco Company, South Richmond Complex Historic District =

Historic buildings in Virginia, US

- U.S. National Register of Historic Places
- U.S. Historic district
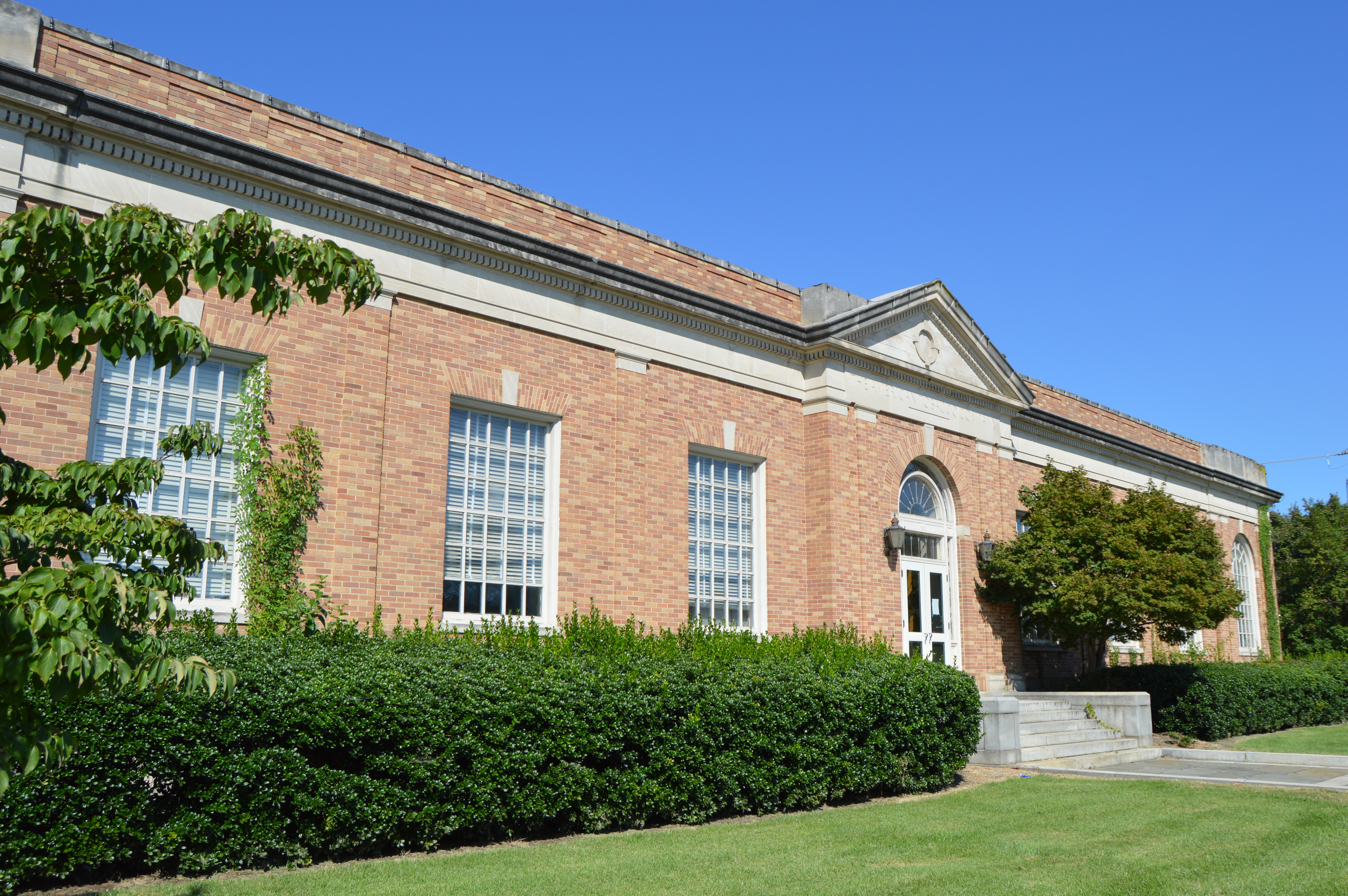

- Location within Virginia Location within the United States
- Location: 400-800 Jefferson Davis Highway, Richmond, Virginia
- Coordinates: 37°30′31″N 77°26′52″W
- Area: 16 acres (6.5 ha)
- Built: 1911
- NRHP reference No.: 16000536
- Added to NRHP: August 15, 2016

The American Tobacco Company, South Richmond Complex Historic District encompasses a complex of tobacco storage, processing, and research facilities at 400-800 Jefferson Davis Highway in Richmond, Virginia. Included in the 16-acre (6.5 ha) site are four large warehouses, processing buildings including a stemmery and a re-drying plant, and ancillary buildings and structures, including the American Tobacco Company's 1939 research laboratory. The complex exhibits a historical range of trends in the processing and storage of tobacco.

The complex was listed on the National Register of Historic Places in 2016.

== See also ==
- National Register of Historic Places listings in Richmond, Virginia
