= Presentation Academy =

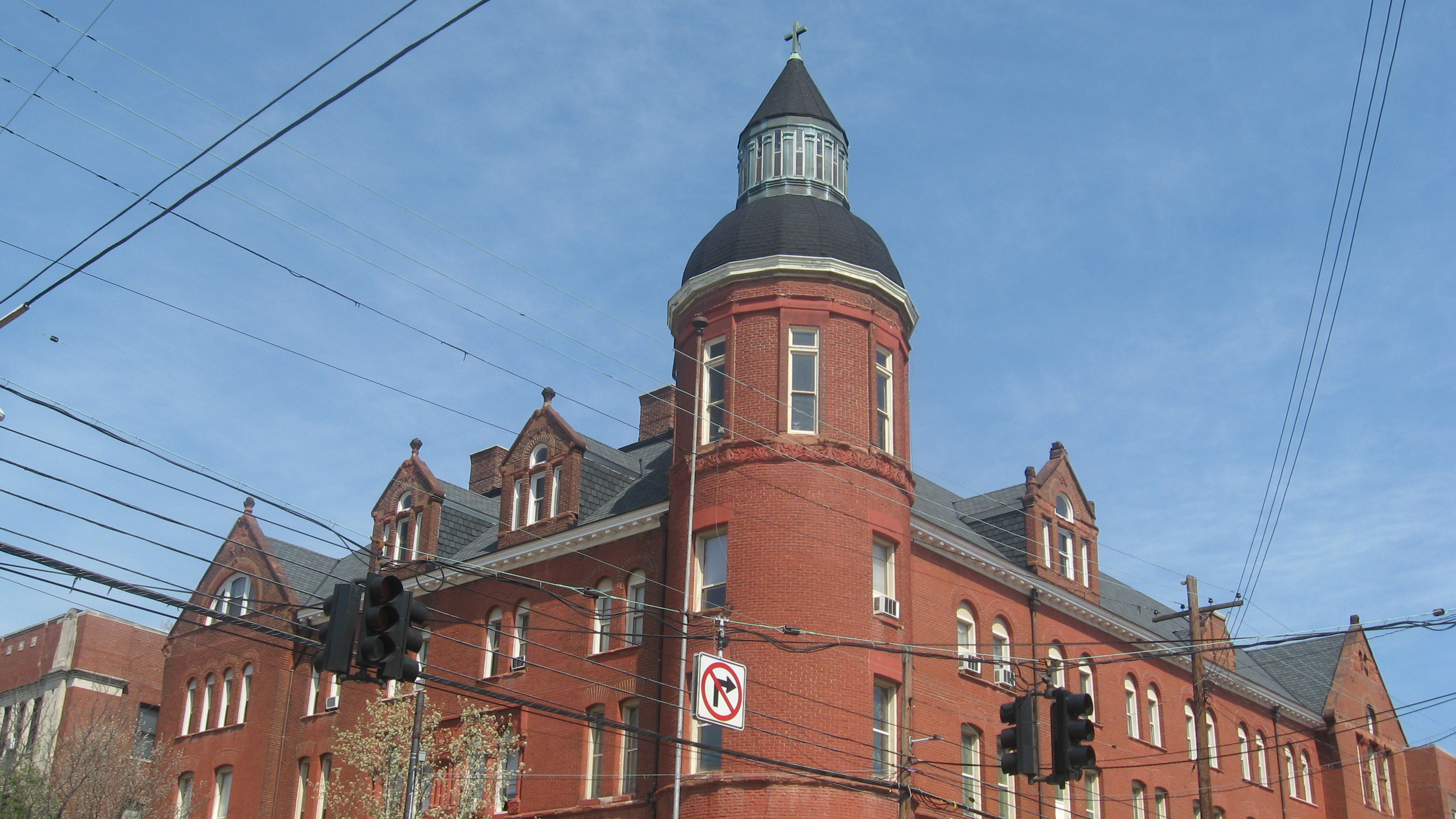

Location
- 861 South 4th Street; Louisville, (Jefferson County), Kentucky 40203; United States; 38°14′32″N 85°45′34″W

Information
- Type: Private, All-Girls
- Religious affiliation: Catholic
- Established: 1831; 195 years ago
- Founder: Catherine Spalding
- President: Laura Dills '94
- Principal: Becca Noonan '00
- Grades: 9–12
- Gender: female
- Colors: Navy blue and white
- Mascot: Topper (Top Hat)
- Nickname: Toppers, Pres, P.A.
- Accreditation: Southern Association of Colleges and Schools
- Publication: Tower Yearbook (school annual); The Tower (newsletter)
- Athletic Director: Jill O'Bryan
- Website: www.presentationacademy.org

- Presentation Academy
- U.S. National Register of Historic Places
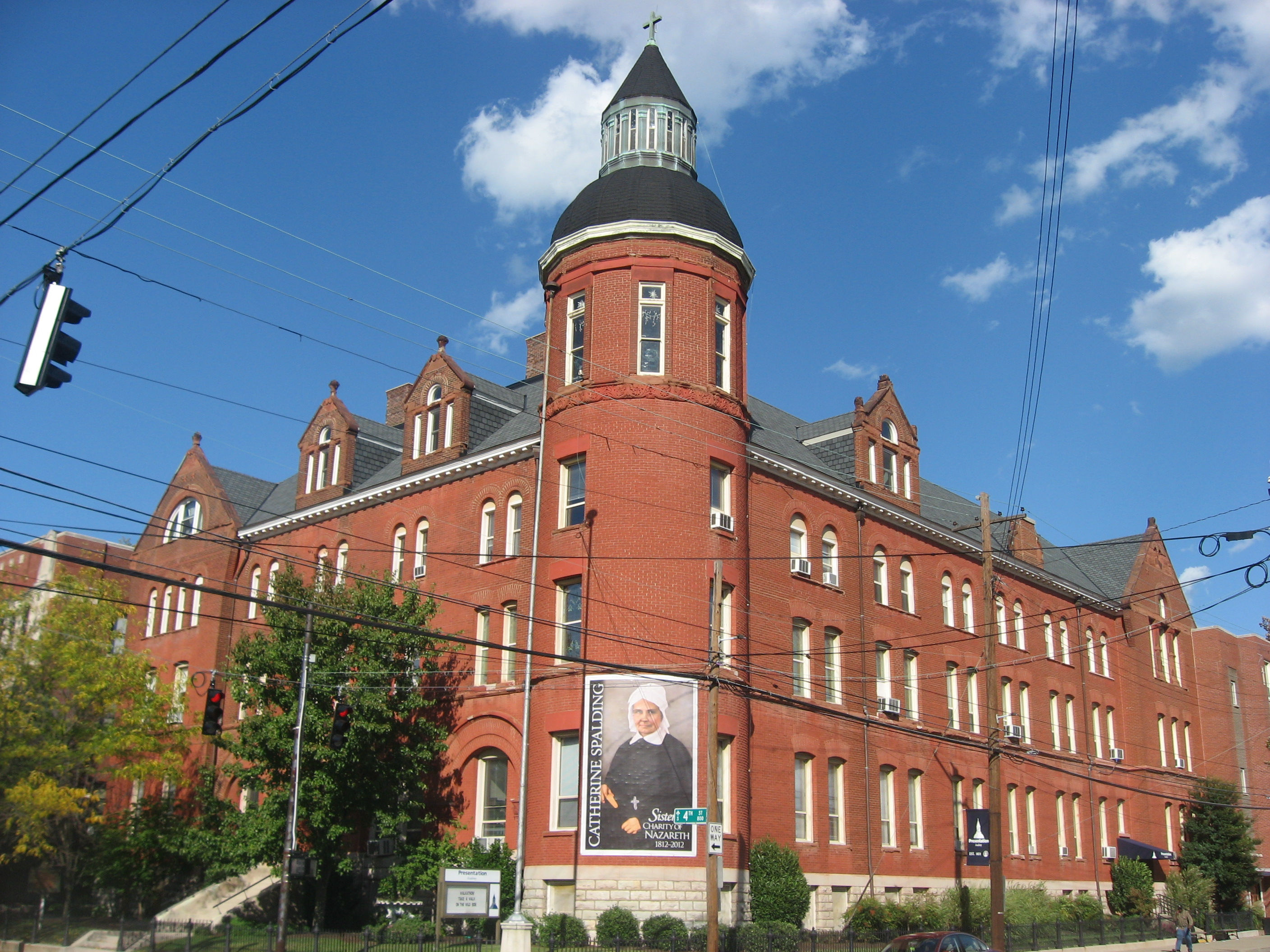
- Front and southern side
- Location: Louisville, Kentucky
- Built: 1893
- Architect: D.X. Murphy
- Architectural style: Richardsonian Romanesque
- NRHP reference No.: 78001364
- Added to NRHP: 1978

Presentation Academy, a college-preparatory high school for young women, is located in Downtown Louisville, Kentucky, United States, just north of Old Louisville in the Archdiocese of Louisville. Founded in 1831 by Mother Catherine Spalding, foundress of the Sisters of Charity of Nazareth, it is the oldest school in continuous operation in Louisville.

== History ==
Mother Catherine Spalding founded Presentation in 1831. The school began in a rented house, but in October of the same year moved to its own building on Fourth Street where it would remain for over fifty years. Presentation was the second school founded in Louisville. A public school effort started in 1828 quickly failed due to lack of funds, and thus Presentation became the oldest school in continuous operation in the city.

The school expanded, and in 1891 NLBI, the corporate arm of the religious community operating Presentation, bought a lot and house at the corner of Fourth and Breckenridge for $35,000. In June 1892, arrangements were made to replace the house, which had been built in 1867 by Thomas Jacobs, with a new building designed by D. X. Murphy. The building was to cost approximately $66,000. A gym and auditorium were added in 1938 and another class room addition to the rear was made in 1948.

The school initially offered primary and secondary education, but closed the elementary section in 1945 to accommodate an increasing enrollment in the all-girls secondary school. The building features a distinctive Richardsonian Romanesque tower, which was rebuilt after a fire in 1977. It was designed by D.X. Murphy, who also designed the famous twin-spired clubhouse at Churchill Downs. The building was listed in 2004 as one of Louisville's Ten favorites, according to the Courier-Journal. Generations of students have signed their names to the interior walls of the tower.

Enrollment was consistently around 800 students during the 1950s and 1960s, but by 1993 it had dropped to just 230 students, and the school was over $760,000 in debt. It was announced that the doors would close in May 1995. However, a successful grassroots campaign by alumnae, students, and parents paid off the debt; and the Sisters of Charity relinquished control of the school to nearby Spalding University. The school became independent again in 2004, after becoming financially stable with a $6.2 million budget, and created its own board of trustees.

In 2006 the school purchased a 22,000-square-foot (2,000 m^{2}) property across the street to serve as the current location of an Arts and Athletic Center that replaced the past gym/auditorium (built in 1938 and now owned by Spalding University). Construction of this new $5 million building at 900 South Fourth Street, catty-corner to the existing campus, formally began with the ground breaking on May 5, 2008. On Friday, January 23, 2009, Presentation Academy marked the placement of the final beam in the Arts and Athletic Center with a "Topping Off" ceremony. The center was dedicated on September 13, 2009, and awarded the Best New Landmark of 2009 by www.brokensidewalk.com.

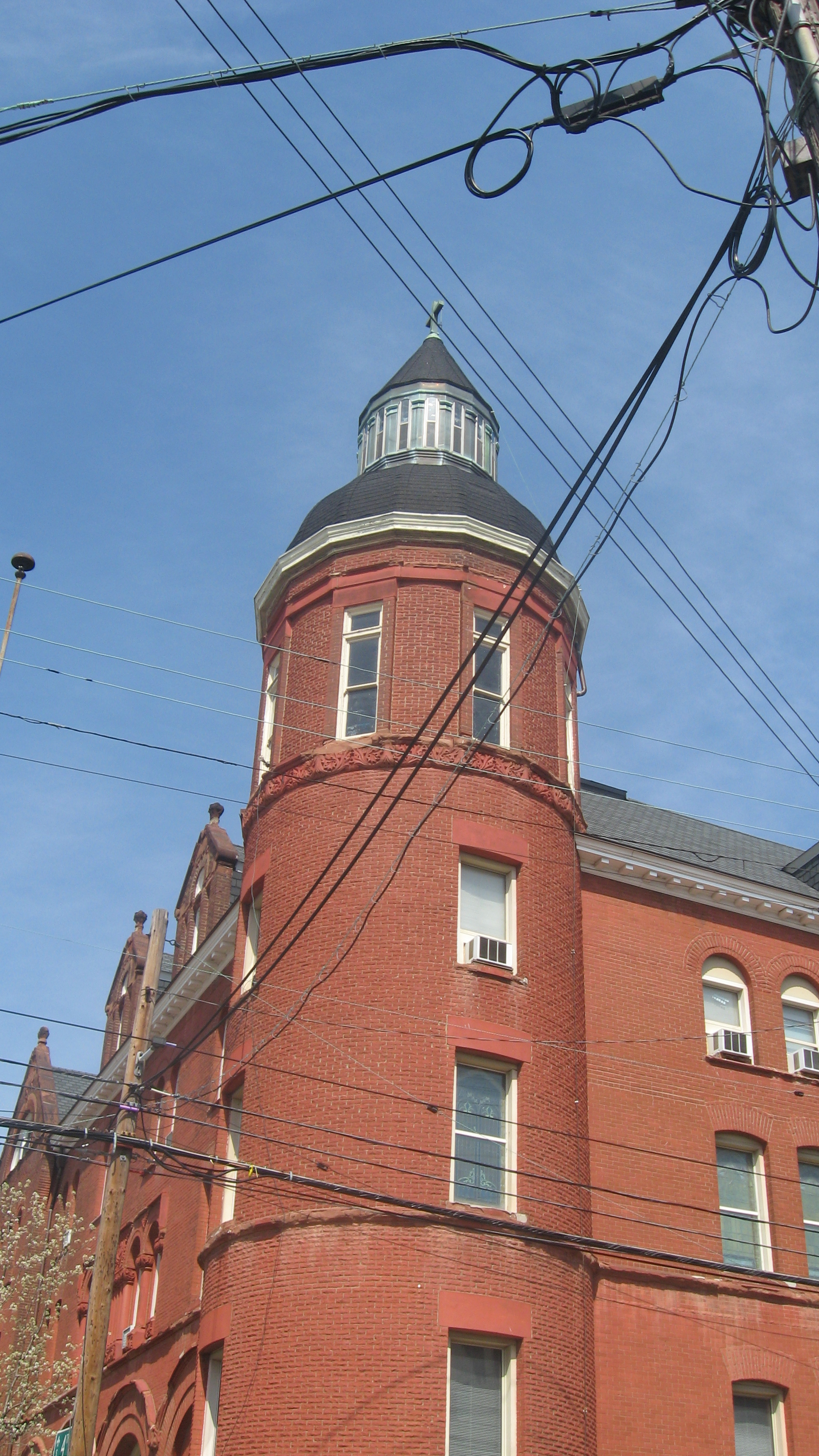
The Tower

== Traditions ==
A long-standing tradition allows only seniors to use the front carpeted staircase. The front entrance is used by freshmen on their first day at Pres and by seniors on their last day. Also on their last day of school, seniors sign their names on the inside of the Tower.

Presentation's annual Walk-A-Thon is held every fall to raise money for students in need of financial assistance. Each year has a different theme and a different T-shirt designed by a student. After money is raised and a pep rally is held, the girls walk three miles around downtown Louisville to show their school spirit.

== Campus ==
Because Presentation Academy is located near the heart of Downtown Louisville, the students have after-school access to 4th Street Live!, the Main Library, and various Spalding University resources. Field trips are usually taken on foot, such as to The Courier-Journal building, the Louisville Hall of Justice, the Muhammad Ali Center, and the Frazier History Museum.

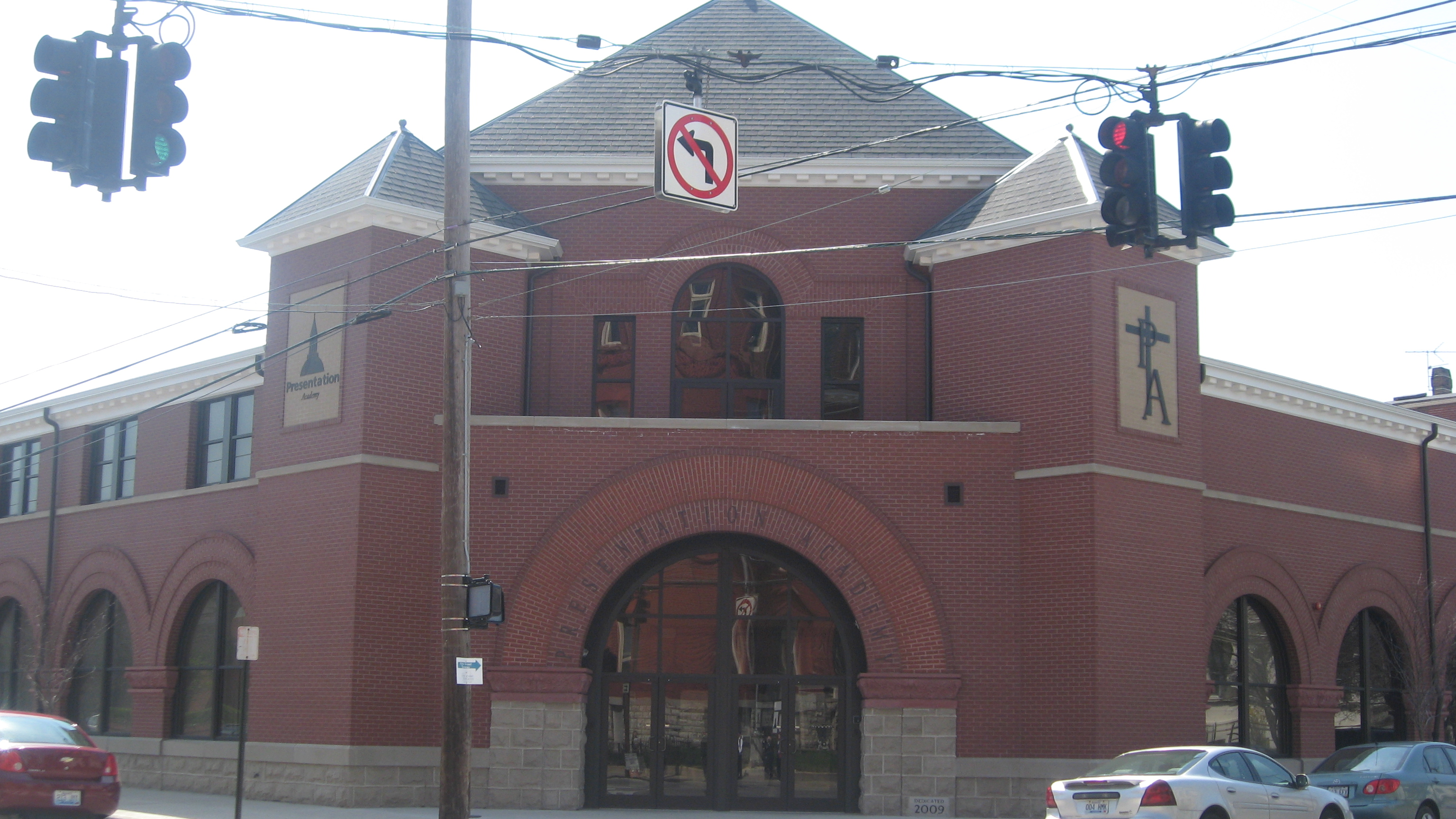
Presentation's Arts and Athletic Center

The new $5 million, 29,600-square-foot Arts and Athletic Center opened in August 2009, replaced the 1938 gymnasium, and houses the school's arts programs and Topper athletic teams. Designed by Gil Stein & Associates and built by Whittenberg Construction Co., the facility is a result of Tower Vision, Presentation Academy's first capital campaign. The Arts and Athletic center contains a 700-seat gymnasium, 300-seat auditorium, art & dance studios, and offices.

== Uniform ==
Like many other private schools, Presentation Academy has a dress code. Uniform shirts include the white polo, white oxford, and light blue polo. The navy blue vest, v-neck sweater, and pants may be worn, as can the original navy blue skirt or the new plaid skirt. Presentation also has the winter uniform, a navy blue jacket and pants set that may be worn during the colder months.

== Sports ==
Presentation offers archery, volleyball, field hockey, soccer, cross country, golf, cheerleading, lacrosse, dance, basketball, swimming, softball, track, and tennis.

== Clubs ==
Extracurricular activities include the Interact Club, Newspaper Club, Book Club, Student Council, Believe Club, Language and Culture Club, STEAM Club, Math and Robotics Club, ATL Ushers, Podcasting Club, Environmental Club, Y Club (KYA/KUNA), National Honor Society, National Art Honor Society, Girl Talk, Science National Honor Society, International Thespian Society, Bowling Club, Mission Club, Drama Club, Anime Club, St. Joseph of Arimathea Society, Governor's Cup, and Prezettes.

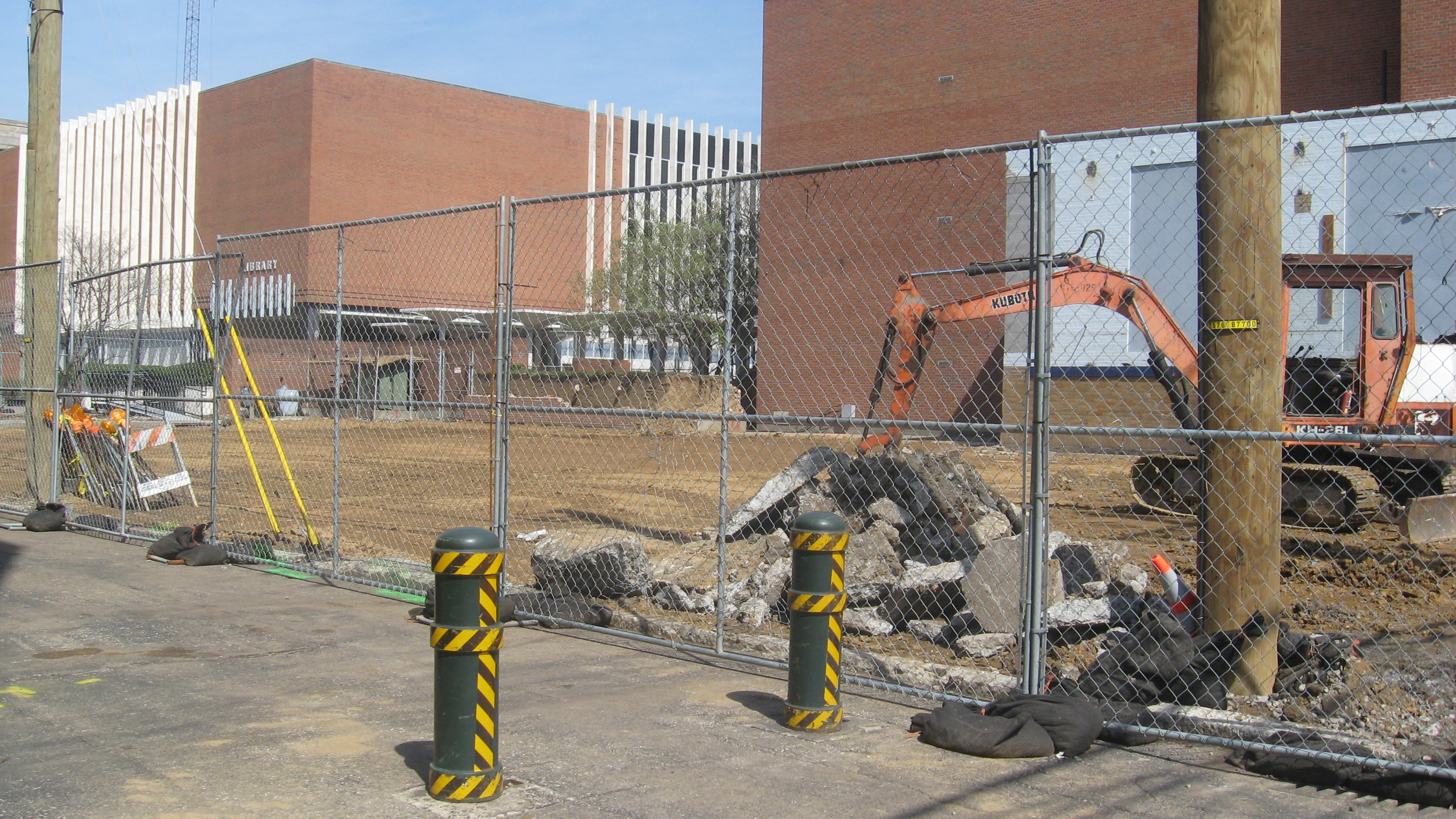
Spalding University's green space construction, next to Presentation

== Recent events ==
Spalding University has demolished the old one-story, limestone-clad, art-deco Presentation gym and has made the remaining space, next to the historic Presentation building, a green space. This institution hosts an annual event called Tower Awards that is primarily for fundraising for the students and school of Presentation Academy.

== Accomplishments ==
- In 2005, students arrived from over 85 Kentucky and Southern Indiana ZIP codes.

== Notable alumnae ==
- Mary Anderson, stage actress
- Mia Zapata, lead singer for The Gits, class of 1984
