= Landward House =

Historic house in Kentucky, United States

- U.S. National Register of Historic Places
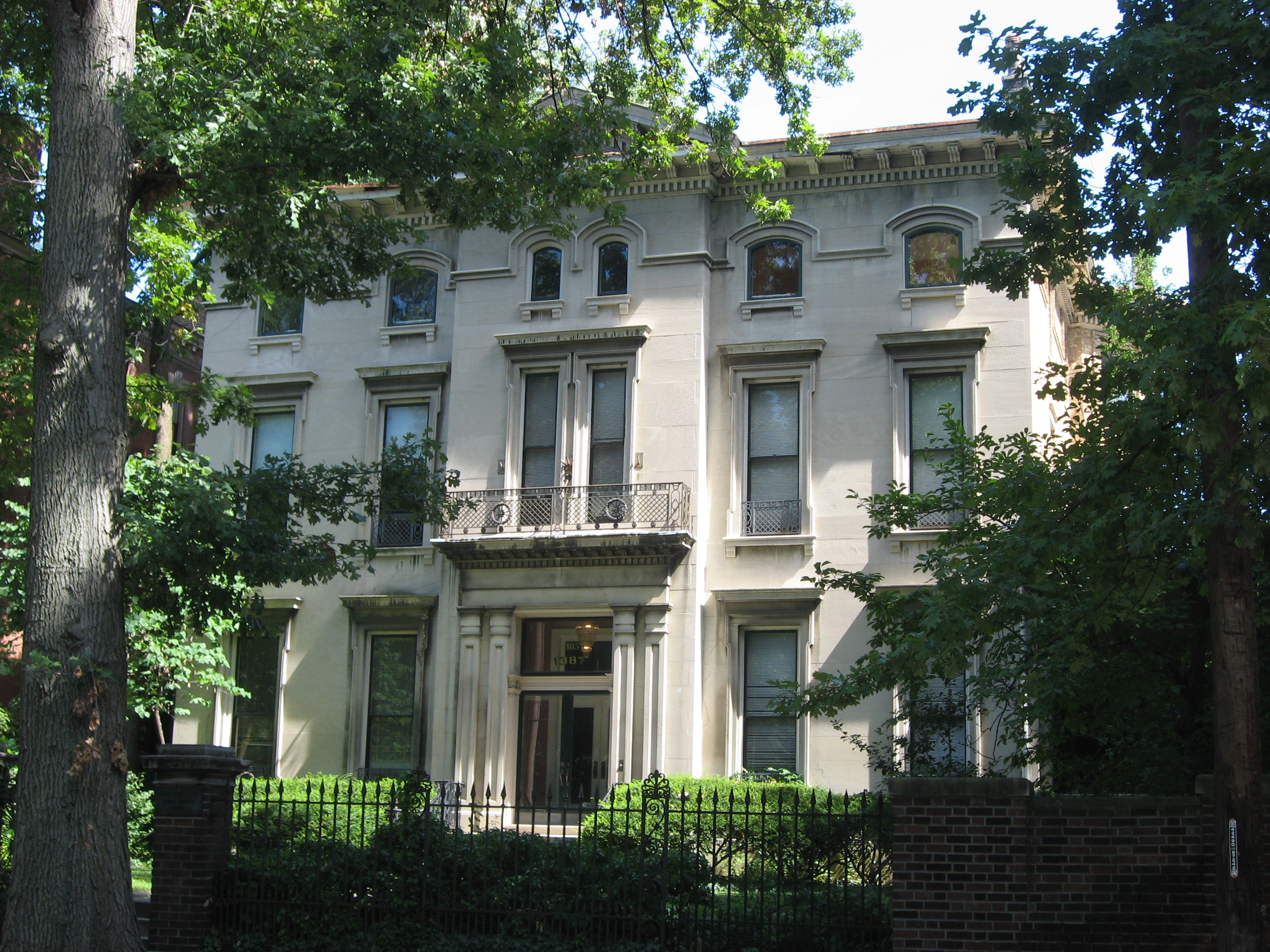
- Front of the house

- Location within Kentucky Location within the United States
- Location: 1385-1387 S. 4th St., Louisville, Kentucky
- Coordinates: 38°13′46″N 85°45′39″W
- Area: 0.8 acres (0.32 ha)
- Built: 1871
- Architect: Henry Whitestone; Frederick Law Olmsted
- Architectural style: Renaissance
- NRHP reference No.: 73000809
- Added to NRHP: September 20, 1973

The Landward House, also known as the Robinson-Marvin-Wheeler House, is a brick Italianate mansion in Louisville, Kentucky. It has a limestone facade and projected entrance. There are 22 rooms and six bathrooms in this three-story building. Dr. Stuart Robinson used the mansion as his office. The garden was created by Frederick Law Olmsted Jr. in 1929. The tertiary garden features a vegetable garden, a labyrinth garden, and an informal side garden. The St. James Court Art Show uses its carriage house for its office.

It was placed on the National Register of Historic Places on September 20, 1973.

It is adjacent to the National Register-listed St. James-Belgravia Historic District, which was the site of the 1883 Southern Exposition.
