= St. Vincent de Paul Catholic Church (Louisville, Kentucky) =

Historic church in Kentucky, United States

- St. Vincent DePaul Church, Rectory, School, St. Ursula Home and Convent
- U.S. National Register of Historic Places
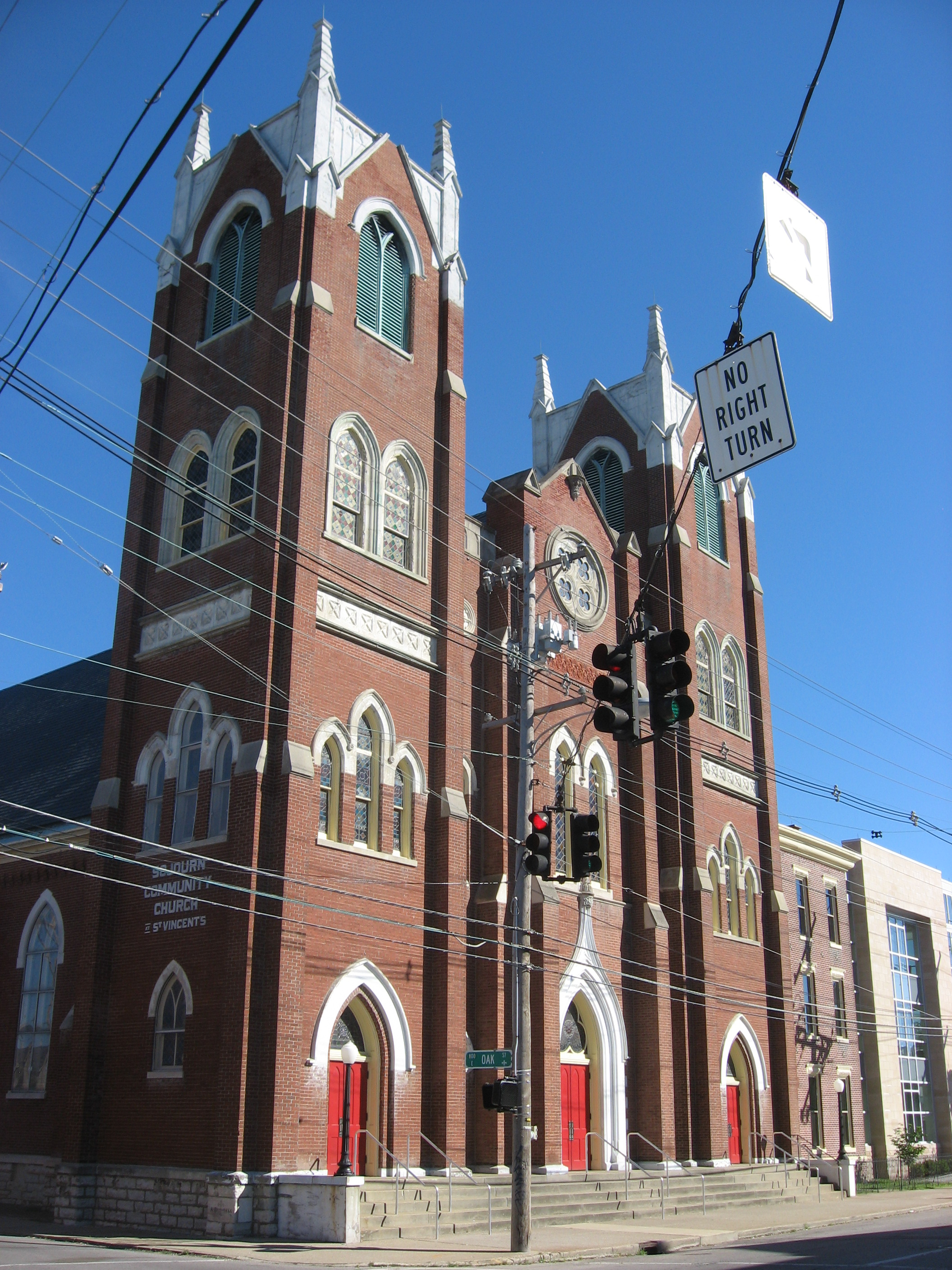
- Front of the church

- Location within Kentucky Location within the United States
- Location: Oak and Shelby Sts., and 1214 Logan St., Louisville, Kentucky
- Coordinates: 38°13′59″N 85°44′27″W
- Area: 2 acres (0.81 ha)
- Built: 1884
- Architect: Murphy, D. X.; et al
- Architectural style: Italianate, Gothic Revival, Classical Revival
- NRHP reference No.: 84000380
- Added to NRHP: November 15, 1984

St. Vincent DePaul Catholic Church is a complex of historic buildings in the Shelby Park neighborhood of Louisville, Kentucky. The main church at 1207 South Shelby Street was purchased by Sojourn Community Church in 2010, which has since rehabilitated and occupied it as Sojourn Midtown. Several related properties were listed on the National Register of Historic Places in 1984.

== Properties ==
The main church was designed by D. X. Murphy in the Gothic Revival style. In 1886, a rectory was added, a brick Italianate structure. Also contributing to the property is the former St. Vincent DePaul School, located across Shelby Street. Designed by Thomas & Bohne in the Classical Revival style, it was completed in 1911. The St. Ursula Home, completed in 1915, reflects classical, American Craftsman, and Italianate influences. The oldest property is 1214 Logan Street, an Italianate structure built in 1884 as a home for sisters who were instructors at the school.

== History ==
In the late 1800s, the still-rural area was mostly populated by German Catholic immigrants. The cornerstone for the first parish church was laid in 1878, a two-story brick building, with services offered in German. The congregation quickly outgrew this facility and in 1886, the cornerstone for a larger church was laid. By the early 20th century, over 1000 families were registered on the parish rolls. Later in the century, however, the congregation shrank as many parishioners decamped to the suburbs. The Archdiocese of Louisville closed the church in 1996, though it continues to use the former elementary school, now called the Maloney Center, for a variety of offices.

Sojourn Community Church purchased the building from the archdiocese in 2010 for $535,000 and undertook a renovation estimated to cost $3.4 million, to rehabilitate the structure and make it suitable for evangelical Southern Baptist worship. The Italianate marble altars and several statues were to be installed at the new St. Bernadette Catholic Church in Norton Commons, and statues of St. Peter and St. Paul were given to parishes of those names in Jefferson County.
