= Catherine Spalding =

American religious leader (1793–1858)

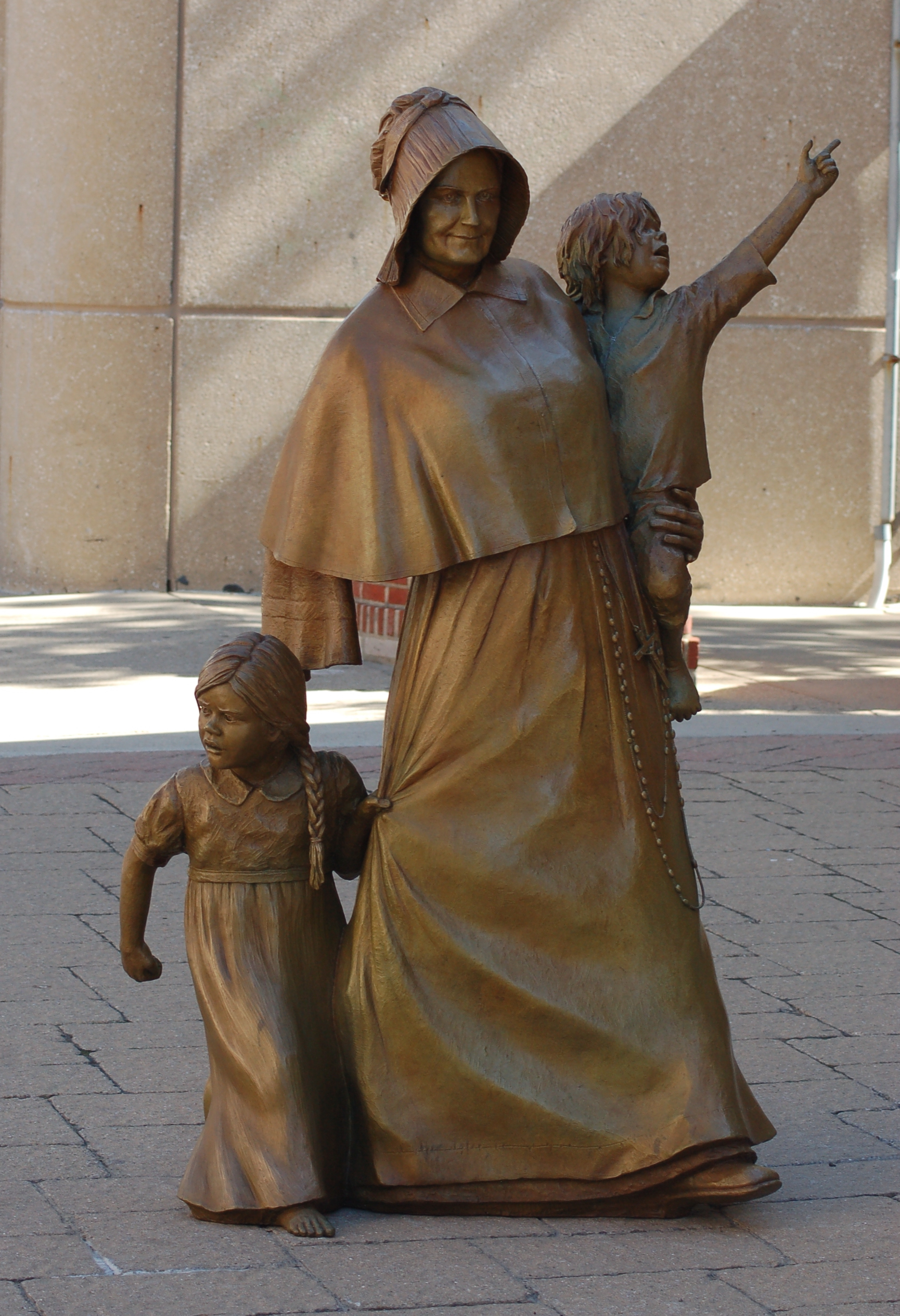
- Bronze statue of Catherine Spalding by Raymond Graf in front of the Cathedral of the Assumption in Louisville, Kentucky

Foundress and educator
- Born: December 23, 1793; Charles County, Maryland
- Died: March 20, 1858 (aged 64); Louisville, Kentucky

Catherine Spalding, known as Mother Spalding, (December 23, 1793 – March 20, 1858) was an American educator who was a co-founder and longtime mother superior of the Sisters of Charity of Nazareth. She pioneered education, health services and social services for girls and orphans in Louisville and other Kentucky cities. On January 6, 2003, the Louisville Courier-Journal named Spalding as the only woman among sixteen "most influential people in Louisville/Jefferson County history."

== Early life ==
Catherine Spalding was born on December 23, 1793, in Pomfret, Charles County, Maryland. At age four, her family moved to Nelson County, Kentucky. Her mother died the next year and her father later deserted the children due to the stress of financial obligations. An uncle and aunt, Thomas and Elizabeth Spalding Elder, raised the five Spalding children with their own ten children. At age 16, Catherine Spalding moved in with her cousins, Richard and Clementina Elder Clark, living there for three years. According to Spalding, the Elders and Clarks provided her with a stable home life, a religious faith, the skills for pioneer homemaking and health care, and the basics of education. She also developed a passion to care for other children orphaned by death or desertion.

== Sisters of Charity of Nazareth ==
After the end of the American Revolution in 1783, over 1,000 Catholic families moved to Kentucky from Maryland. Two of the local religious leaders, Benedict Flaget, the Bishop of Bardstown, and John Baptist David realized that these families needed schools and teachers for their children. Both members of the Sulpician Society, the two clerics wanted to establish a school in Kentucky that was similar to one established by Elizabeth Bayley Seton in Emmitsburg, Maryland.

In 1812, David sought volunteers to begin a women's religious community in Kentucky to serve the Catholic children of the region. It came to be called the Sisters of Charity of Nazareth (SCN). In January 1813, the 19-year-old Spalding, accompanied by her uncle, arrived at St. Thomas Seminary farm in Nelson County, Kentucky, to join with Teresa Carrico and Elizabeth Wells in establishing the new religious community. David gave the women the Rule of Life of Vincent de Paul as was followed in Emmitsburg.

At St. Thomas, the Sisters initially performed farm work, domestic work for the priests and seminarians, and visited the sick. While Carrico had very little education and no apparent aptitude for teaching, her farming, cooking, and housekeeping skills enabled the community to thrive. Over time, three more women joined them, which allowed for the formal establishment of the community as a religious congregation. Spalding was elected as its first Mother Superior.

== Ministry ==
=== Nazareth Academy ===
In 1814, Spalding helped establish a girls school on St. Thomas Farm. Its students included paying and non-paying boarders, along with resident orphans. The St. Thomas community grew and in 1822 moved to a larger property in Nazareth, Kentucky. The girls school became known as Nazareth Academy. It soon developed a reputation as one of the best-known schools for young women in the region outside of New Orleans. Nazareth offered instruction in the usual "ladies' accomplishments" along with a curriculum of arts and sciences.

=== Presentation Academy ===
By 1828, SCN had begun caring for homeless elderly clients. In 1831, Spalding and three other SCN members opened Presentation Academy in the basement of St. Louis Church in Louisville. The school served children of all income levels. Presentation Academy later moved from the basement into several houses on Fifth Street. It is today the oldest school in Louisville. In 1829, when Louisville experienced a cholera epidemic, SCN started nursing poor victims of the disease.

=== St. Vincent Orphanage ===
To care for abandoned immigrant children, Spalding would pick them up on arrival at the Louisville wharf and house them at the Sisters' house behind the church. Spalding later raised funding to build a separate house for 25 orphans. Within three years, Spalding was forced to purchase a larger building for the increased number of orphans. In 1832, this facility became known as St. Vincent Orphanage. She later opened St. Joseph Infirmary in part of the orphanage building.

When not running her institutions, Spalding would return to St. Vincent Orphanage. With the rise in immigration from Ireland and Germany in the 1840s, the orphanage was seeing more children. As superior of the orphanage—"the only place on earth to which my heart clings"—she accepted hundreds of children, directed Sisters and lay assistants, collaborated with professional men and their wives. Spalding was often seen on the streets in Louisville, visiting businesses to solicit donations or attending to the poor in their homes. It was said that "Every orphan in the city claims you as their mother."

=== Mother superior ===
Spalding was elected to several six-year terms as mother superior by the members of SCN. Other Sisters collaborated with her council, and numerous clergy and lay persons worked to establish the three main ministries that Kentuckians lacked. From 1838 on, Spalding served two more terms in leadership. When Bishop Flaget attempted to merge SCN in Kentucky with the Sisters of Charity in Maryland, she successfully opposed it. The other Sisters did not want the merger and Spalding believed that a distant administrator in Maryland would hinder their work in Kentucky.

In 1842, Spalding sent several Sisters to establish institutions in the Diocese of Nashville. In 1843, Spalding opened the first free school in Louisville. Spalding eventually moved the St. Joseph Infirmary into its own building so that the St. Vincent orphanage could expand. Between 1854 and 1855, she directed construction of the church and new academy at Nazareth.

In 1858, Spalding contracted pneumonia while working with the sick. She died on March 20, 1858.

== Legacy ==
SCN is now an international religious order that cares for the sick, poor, and orphaned; and advocates for social justice in five nations in North America, Asia, and Africa.

Spalding has been called the founder of social work in Kentucky. She founded Nazareth Academy (1814), St. Vincent's Academy (1820), St. Catherine's Academy in Lexington, Kentucky (1823), Presentation Academy (1831), St. Vincent's Orphan Asylum (1832), St. Joseph's Hospital (1836), and St. Francis' School at Owensboro, Kentucky (1850).

Spalding University in Louisville is named after Spalding. The Spalding Family Scholarship was established in 1967 by Hughes Spalding and is awarded annually to a student with financial need.

In 2015, a statue of Spalding was unveiled in Louisville, the first statue of a historic woman in public space in the city. It is located at the parish office on South Fifth Street downtown.
