= Fifth Ward School =

- U.S. National Register of Historic Places
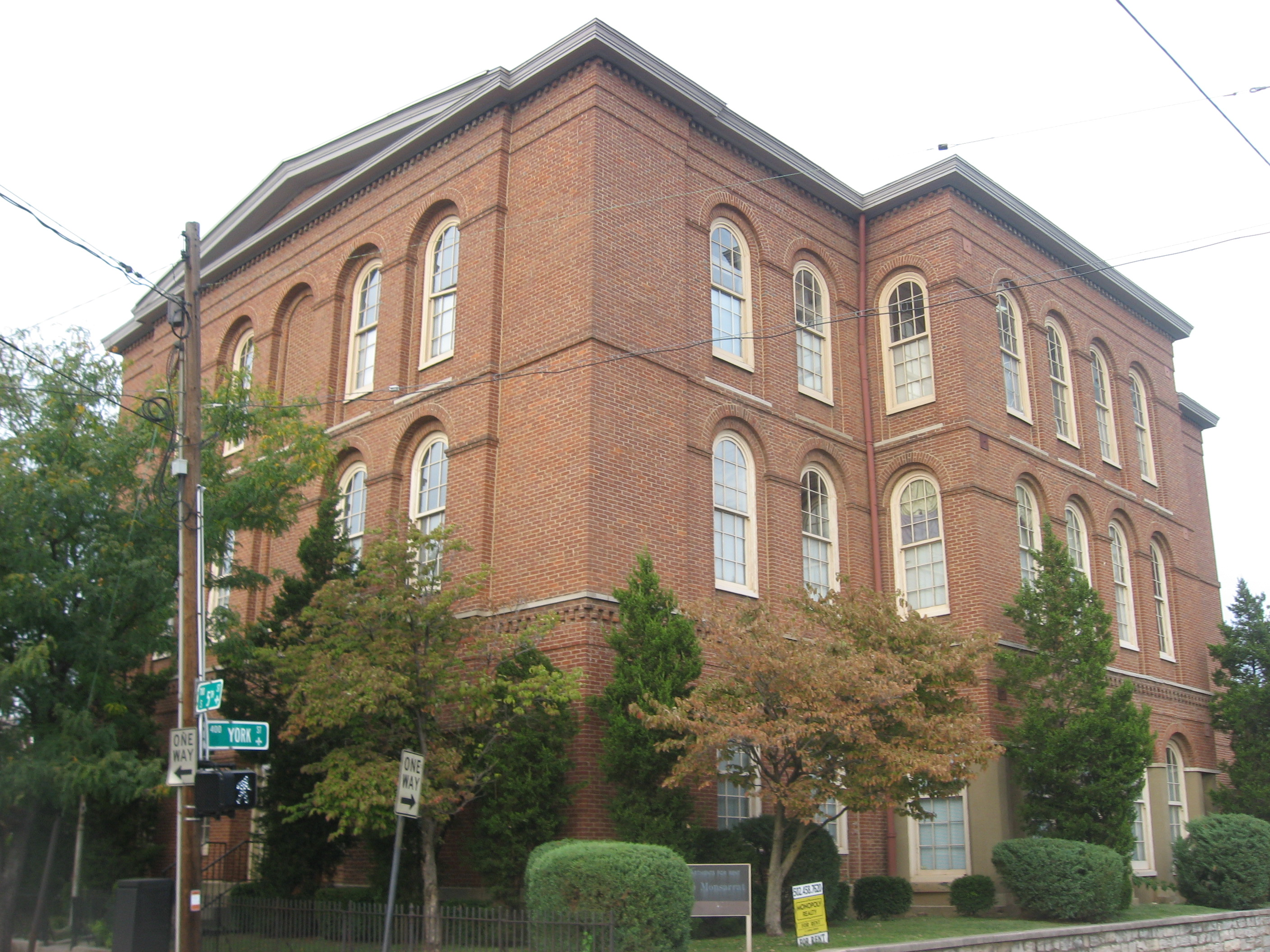
- Location in Kentucky

- Location within Kentucky
- Location: Louisville, Kentucky, United States
- Coordinates: 38°14′40″N 85°45′36″W
- Built: 1855–57
- Architect: Rogers and Whitestone
- Architectural style: Renaissance Revival
- NRHP reference No.: 78001353
- Added to NRHP: 1978

The Fifth Ward School, also known as the Monsarrat School, is a 19th-century, three-story brick building located on 5th and York streets in Louisville, Kentucky, United States. Over the years the building has served as a school, a hospital, a dormitory, a library, and a museum, and is currently occupied by apartments. It is listed in the National Register of Historic Places.

== History ==
The original Fifth Ward School was completed in 1854. It burned down the next year, and the architect Isaiah Rogers was contracted to rebuild the school. The result, the current building in modified Renaissance Revival style, was completed in 1857. The school later came to be known as the Monsarrat School, after its first principal, Laura Lucas Monsarrat.

The Fifth Ward School would serve three hundred children annually. During the Civil War it served as a hospital. During World War II, the building became a dormitory for soldiers.

From 1937 to 1951, the Monsarrat School was used to operate the Free Public Library and Museum, on loan from the Board of Education. This was due to the flood of 1937 that damaged the Louisville Free Public Library building. The museum was located on the first floor. Visitors had to pack into the small museum location until a new one could be afforded.

On May 20, 1940, the library on York Street reopened; however, the museum continued on at the Monsarrat for another 37 years. In 1977, the museum was relocated to downtown, where it is now known as the Kentucky Science Center.

In the 1980s the Monsarrat building was transformed into upscale apartments.
