= Henry Whitestone =

Irish, later American, architect

Henry Whitestone (1819–1893) was an architect born in County Clare, Ireland who became one of the main architects of Louisville, Kentucky.

He is believed to have studied at Trinity College Dublin.

He designed a number of works that are listed on the National Register of Historic Places.

Works include:

- Ennis Courthouse, in Ennis, County Clare, Ireland, with architect John Keane
- J.T.S. Brown and Son's Complex, 105, 107–109 W. Main St., Louisville, Kentucky (Whitestone, Henry), NRHP-listed
- Fifth Ward School, 743 S. 5th St., Louisville, Kentucky (Rogers & Whitestone), NRHP-listed
- Tompkins-Buchanan House, 851 S. 4th St., Louisville, Kentucky (Whitestone, Henry), NRHP-listed
- Trade Mart Building, 131 W. Main St., Louisville, Kentucky (Whitestone, Henry), NRHP-listed
- One or more works in Second and Market Streets Historic District, roughly, area around Second and Market Sts., Louisville, Kentucky (Whitestone, Henry), NRHP-listed
- One or more works in Whiskey Row Historic District, 101-133 W. Main St., Louisville, Kentucky (Whitestone, Henry), NRHP-listed
- Peterson-Dumesnil House, 310 South Peterson Avenue, Louisville, Kentucky, NRHP-listed

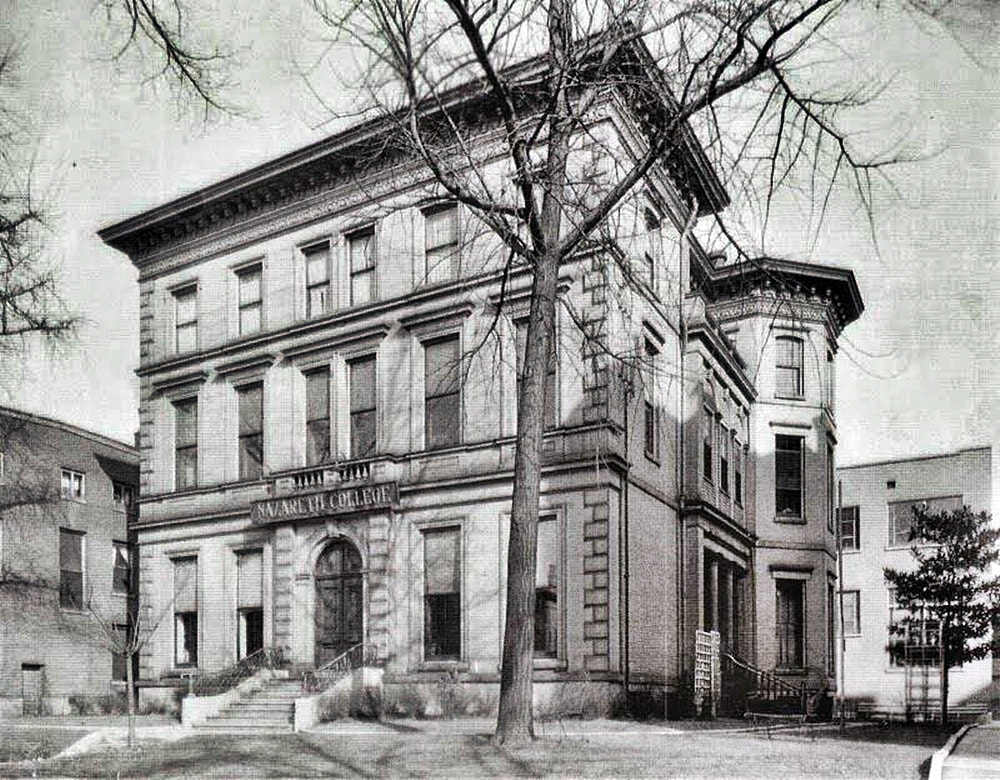

== See also ==
- Luckett and Farley#The Whitestone period
