= Peterson–Dumesnil House =

- U.S. National Register of Historic Places
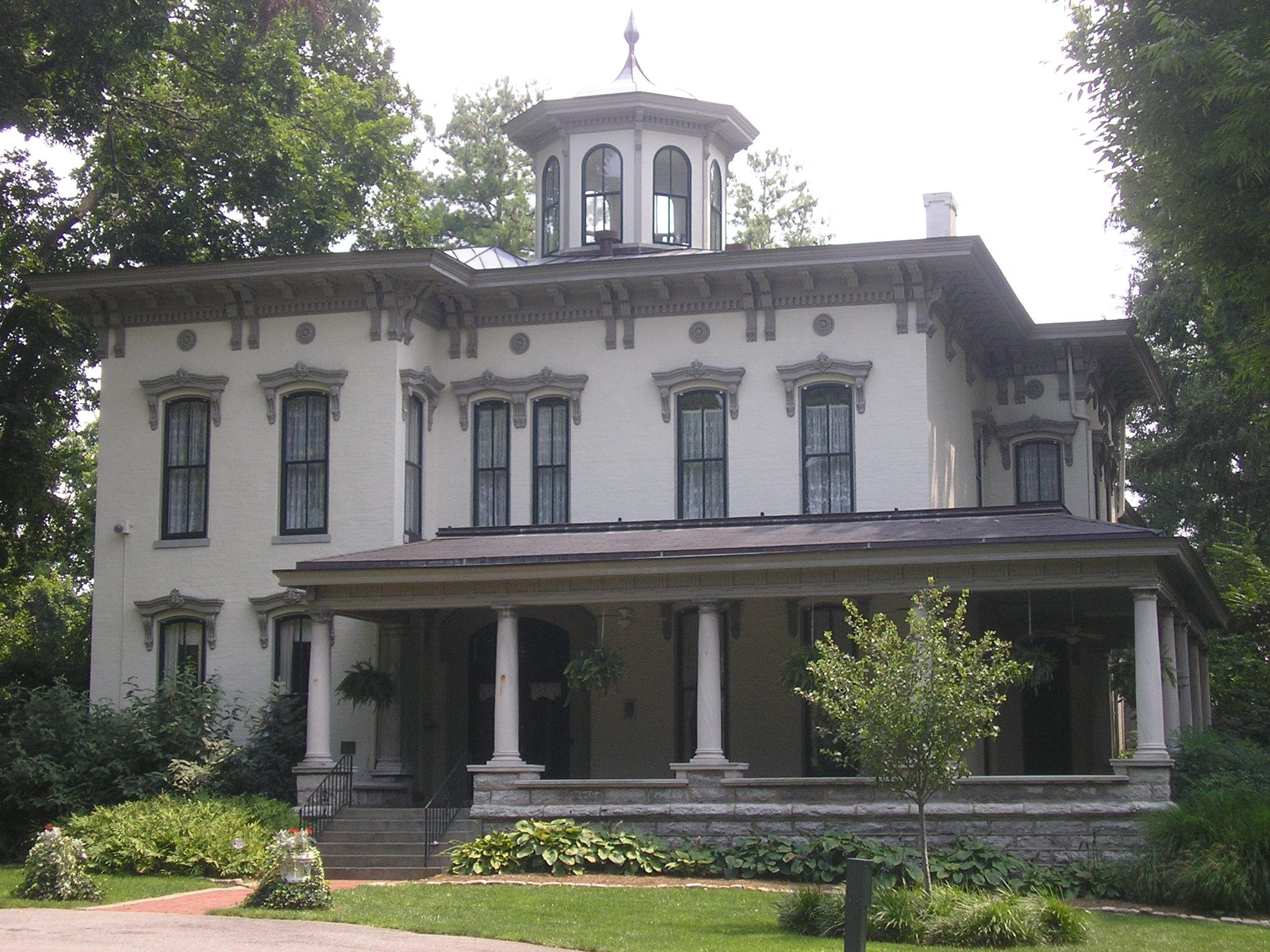

- Location within Kentucky Location within the United States
- Location: Louisville, Kentucky
- Coordinates: 38°15′3″N 85°41′47″W
- Built: 1869-1870
- Architect: Henry Whitestone
- Architectural style: Victorian-Italianate
- NRHP reference No.: 75000773
- Added to NRHP: 1975

The Peterson–Dumesnil House is a Victorian-Italianate house in the Crescent Hill neighborhood of Louisville, Kentucky, United States. Of the remaining large country estates built by Louisvillians in the late 19th century to the east of the city, it is the closest to Downtown Louisville, and primarily for that reason, it was added to the National Register of Historic Places in 1975.

== History ==
The house was built on a 31-acre (130,000 m^{2}) lot in 1869 or 1870. In the post-Civil-War period, wealthy Louisvillians began to build country houses near the city, where they would spend weekends or summers, and eventually live as faster transportation to the city became available. It was originally one of several similar villa-style houses built on large lots on the south side of Frankfort Avenue, overlooking the valley through which Grinstead Drive now runs. Most houses on large lots as close to Downtown as the Peterson–Dumesnil house were demolished to make way for suburban residential development on small lots in the early 20th century. By 1974, only one other old estate remained in Crescent Hill, and it was irrepairibly damaged by the tornado that hit Louisville that year.

Joseph Peterson, a wealthy Louisville tobacco merchant, built the house. He was known for his contributions to Louisville architecture, as his 1889 obituary reads, he "built many of the handsome and best structures which adorn our streets". The house is believed to have been designed by local architect Henry Whitestone.

Peterson's granddaughter, Eliza Dumesnil, inherited the house and lived in it until her death in 1948. The Louisville Board of Education then purchased it and operated it as a private club for teachers, the only one of its kind in the United States, but this practice was abandoned and in 1982 the board declared it surplus, and sold the house to the Peterson–Dumesnil House Foundation.

The house is home to the Crescent Hill Community Council in the Louisville Historical League and is rented out for events such as weddings.

== Architecture ==
The Peterson House was built after the Civil War, circa 1869–70, in the asymmetrical Italian villa style. It is built of brick on a limestone foundation, painted white, and is two stories tall. The only major alteration to the structure is a new front porch, built sometime after 1898.

The house's Italianate facade is common in mansions of the period, and the exterior is also marked by a large cupola.

== See also ==
- List of attractions and events in the Louisville metropolitan area
