= Darlington Industrial Historic District =

Historic district in South Carolina, United States

- U.S. National Register of Historic Places
- U.S. Historic district
- Location within South Carolina Location within the United States
- Location: Roughly bounded by Sixth St., Ave. B, Dargan St., and Siskron St., Darlington, South Carolina
- Coordinates: 34°18′01″N 79°51′54″W
- Area: 26 acres (11 ha)
- Built: c.1890-1925
- MPS: City of Darlington MRA
- NRHP reference No.: 88000062
- Added to NRHP: February 10, 1988

Darlington Industrial Historic District is a national historic district located at Darlington, Darlington County, South Carolina. The district encompasses 12 contributing buildings and 1 contributing structure in an industrial section of Darlington. They were built between about 1890 and 1925. All of these buildings are located along the rights-of-way of the South Carolina Western Railway and the Charleston, Sumter and Northern Railroad since the industries each of these buildings served employed the services of the railroad. Among the prominent resources in the district are the Charleston, Sumter and Northern Railway Freight Station (1891), the Darlington Roller Mill (1899), Thomas and Howard Tobacco Warehouse (ca. 1901); and Price's Tobacco Warehouse (ca. 1901), and a cotton warehouse.

It was listed on the National Register of Historic Places in 1988.

It includes a stemmery, the W. B. Lewis & Sons Tobacco Stemmery, at 474 E. Broad Street, built ca. 1900, with a brick addition on the east side. It is a large, three-story, flat-roofed building with a stepped parapet. It is 11 bays wide on north and south sides, 20 bays wide on east and west.
