= Tobacco Workers International Union =

Former trade union of the United States

The Tobacco Workers International Union (TWIU) was a labor union representing workers in the tobacco industry in the United States and Canada.

== History ==
The union was founded on May 25, 1895, at a conference in St. Louis, which brought together ten local unions. Initially named the National Tobacco Workers' Union, it became the TWIU in 1899.

The union immediately faced opposition from the American Tobacco Company. In response, it promoted a boycott of the company, while encouraging independent companies which permitted it to organize to place union labels in their products. It also fought to end the use of child labor in the tobacco industry, and to improve working conditions.

In 1916, workers in various factories across New York and the Mid West walked out to demand wage increases. This led the union to become more militant, and it had particular success in recruiting workers in North Carolina. By 1920, membership had risen to 15,200, but reversals in North Carolina reduced this figure to only 1,500 in 1925, and the union came close to bankruptcy. However, it recovered through organizing workers in the Axton-Fisher Tobacco Company, which experienced rapid growth.

Working conditions in tobacco factories of Richmond, Virginia were very poor in the 1920s and 1930s, with two writers stating that conditions had "changed very little since the days of slavery." These writers also claimed that Tobacco Workers International Union (TWIU) in Richmond at that time was "entirely ineffective and openly collaborated with the employers." Eventually, in 1937, the Southern Negro Youth Congress, a wing of the CIO's National Negro Congress, established the Tobacco Stemmers' and Laborers' Industrial Union (TSLIU) in Richmond, and these unionization efforts spread to other local workplaces.

The union's leading figure from its formation until 1940 was E. Lewis Evans, who opposed strikes. In order to consolidate his power, he discouraged the arrangement of any conventions; none were held between 1900 and 1939, in which year he was ordered by a court to permit one to be run. At the convention, his perspectives were defeated, and all but one of the executive board were replaced.

The TWIU organized at the Liggett and Myers tobacco plant in Durham, North Carolina for many years around issues of seniority and civil rights.

On August 17, 1978, the TWIU merged into the Bakery and Confectionery Workers' International Union.

== Leadership ==
=== Presidents ===
1895: John Fischer
1908: A. McAndrews
1921: W. R. Walden
1926: E. Lewis Evans
1940: W. Warren Smith
1943: Radford G. Powell
1944: John O'Hare
1968: Howard W. Vogt
1970: Rene Rondou

=== Secretary-Treasurers ===
1895: E. Lewis Evans
1940: Robert J. Petree
c.1970: Homer Cole

== See also ==
- History of commercial tobacco in the United States
