= Sisters of Charity of Nazareth =

American Catholic order of religious sisters

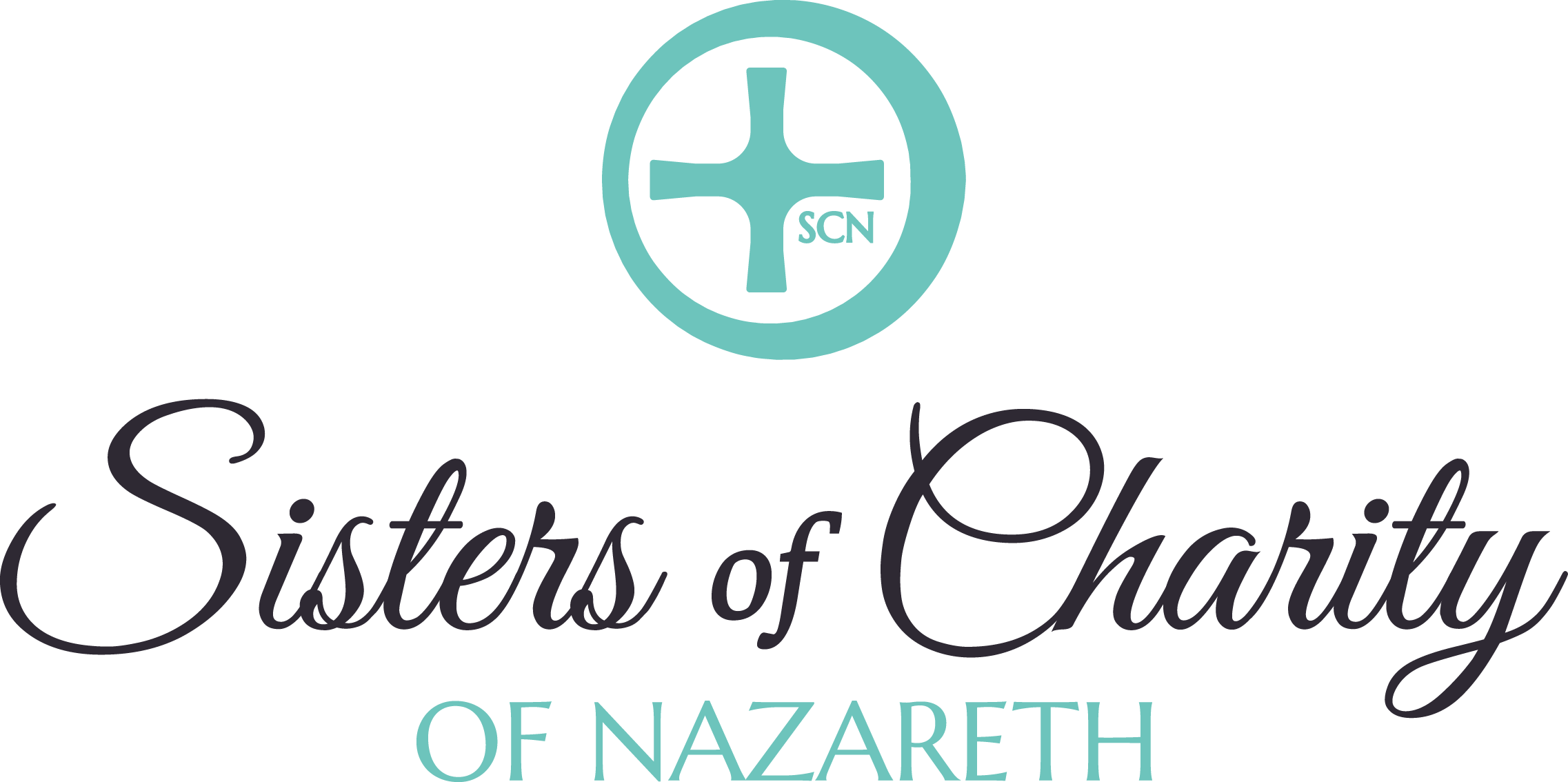
- Formation: December 1, 1812
- Type: Religious institute
- Headquarters: Nazareth, Kentucky
- Location: United States, Belize, Botswana, India, Nepal, Kenya
- President: Jackulin Jesu
- Parent organization: Nazareth Literary & Benevolent Institution
- Website: nazareth.org

The Sisters of Charity of Nazareth (SCN) is an American Catholic order of religious sisters founded in 1812 near Bardstown, Kentucky. There, three young women responded to Bishop John Baptist Mary David's call for assistance in ministering to the needs of the people of the area. The community follows the Rule of Vincent de Paul.

== History ==
The Sisters of Charity of Nazareth was founded in 1812. Mother Catherine Spalding, along with Bishop John Baptist Mary David, are honored together and remembered as co-founders of the Sisters of Charity of Nazareth.

In 1812, in the newly formed diocese of Bardstown, Kentucky, Bishop Benedict Flaget was overwhelmed by the responsibility of providing religious education for the children of Catholic families who had migrated to Kentucky from Maryland after the Revolutionary War. In response to this need, Father John Baptist David, who had recently established St. Thomas Seminary, called for young women willing to devote their lives to the service of the Church. From among a group of six women that responded to the call, nineteen-year-old Catherine Spalding, originally from Maryland, was elected first superior of the Congregation. Mother Catherine guided the young Congregation for forty-five years.

The new community followed the rule of St. Vincent de Paul and their dwelling was named Nazareth. The symbol of the congregation is the pelican feeding its young from its own body. The Sisters' spiritual formation and service to their neighbors steadily expanded on the Kentucky frontier and beyond.

=== Ministry ===
Their education ministry began in 1814 when the first school, Nazareth Academy, was opened at the motherhouse near Bardstown. Spalding founded Presentation Academy in Louisville, Kentucky, in 1831. The academy began to grant degrees in 1829.

Since the beginning years of the congregation, SCNs have been involved in a variety of ministries, responding to the needs of the times. In 1832, when Catherine Spalding brought home two orphans left on the wharf in Louisville, their social work ministry began.

In 1833, when cholera struck, SCNs nursed victims of the disease. So began their health care ministry, which continued as the sisters served in military hospitals during the Civil War.

In 1920, the Sisters opened Nazareth College in Louisville, Kentucky's first, four-year, Catholic college for women. The Louisville and Nazareth campuses merged. and in 1969, the school was renamed Spalding College. Two years later, all instructional activity was moved to the Louisville campus. Former dorms on SCN's campus now function as affordable housing for the elderly and disabled. In 1984, Spalding College became Spalding University.

Pastoral ministry later emerged within the congregation as a distinct form of ministry after Vatican II as they followed the call of the Church to respond to the signs of the times.

=== Modern times ===
In 2000, the sisters apologized for the slaveholding past and erected a monument in memory of those who had suffered in their bondage.

Founded as a diocesan community, they are now an international congregation, both in ministry and membership. As of 2018, 550 sisters were serving in 20 states in the U.S., in India, Nepal, Botswana, and Belize.

They are committed to six priorities in ministry: promoting peace, promoting humanization of values, opposing racism, alleviating poverty, supporting women's issues and supporting environmental issues.

== Mission ==
mission statement as enacted by the SCN General Assembly in 2023

"MISSION STATEMENT

We Sisters of Charity of Nazareth are an international Congregation impelled by the love of Christ in the tradition of Vincent de Paul and Louise de Marillac and the pioneer spirit of Catherine Spalding.

Embracing intercultural relationships, we and our Associates commit ourselves to care for all creation and to work for peace and justice in solidarity with oppressed and marginalized peoples."

--SISTERS OF CHARITY OF NAZARETH GENERAL ASSEMBLY 2023

== See also ==
- St. Thomas-St. Vincent Orphanage

== Sources ==
- Jones, Arthur (October 6, 2012). "Sisters of Charity of Nazareth celebrate two centuries of service". National Catholic Reporter. Archived from the original on May 24, 2013.
