= Whiskey Row, Louisville =

Coordinates: 38°15′23″N 85°45′09″W

- 100 West Main Street Historic District
- U.S. National Register of Historic Places
- U.S. Historic district
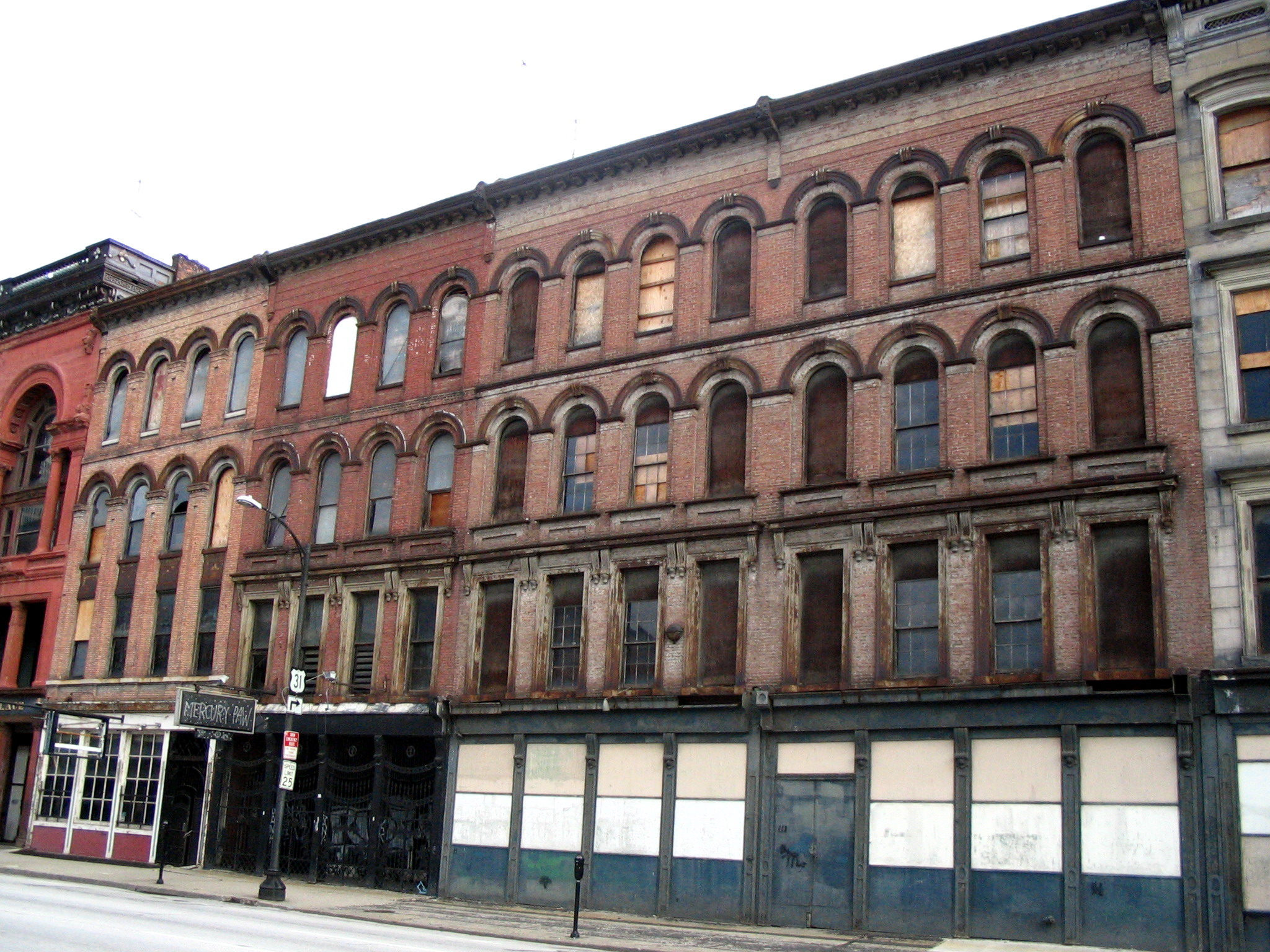
- A portion of Louisville's historic Whiskey Row on West Main Street

- Location within Kentucky Location within the United States
- Location: 101–133 W. Main St., Louisville, Kentucky
- Area: 2 acres (0.81 ha)
- Built: 1852–1905
- Architect: Henry Whitestone, John Andrewartha, D.X. Murphy
- Architectural style: Revivalist, Chicago School
- NRHP reference No.: 89000385
- Added to NRHP: June 4, 2010

Whiskey Row in Louisville, Kentucky refers to an area along Main Street, close to the Ohio River, which was home to the bourbon industry.

== History ==
In 1857, the buildings were built and used to store whiskey barrels that had been produced from the distilleries nearby. On a list of Louisville Most Endangered Historic Places, the buildings were slated for demolition in 2011, but an agreement between the city, local developers, and preservationists saved Whiskey Row.

Numerous distilleries would transport whiskey barrels to the Louisville market for sale by train or wagon. Main Street became so extremely populated with whiskey firms that it decided to name the buildings Whiskey Row. Due to the countless roles that Kentucky played in the liquor market, it later became the leading producer for distilled spirits. Some of the top liquor companies such as Brown Forman, Greenbrier Distillery, John T. Barbee, amongst other major companies have their offices and businesses in Louisville.

D.X. Murphy & Brother designed the Galt House Hotel and distillery buildings including:

- Bernheim Distillery (c.1896)
- Combined Distillers of Kentucky (c.1905–1906)
- Bonnie Brothers Distillery (c.1903–1912)
- The Phil. Hollenbach Company (c.1889), 528 Main, which in 2023 was home of the Evan Williams Bourbon Experience

With Prohibition, which was in effect from 1919 to 1933, the distilleries closed and many buildings were lost.

The 100 West Main Street Whiskey Row Historic District refers in particular to a block-long stretch from 101 to 133 W. Main Street, which was listed on the National Register of Historic Places in 2010. It is a collection of eleven contributing buildings in Renaissance Revival, Beaux Arts, and Chicago School styles with cast-iron storefronts that were built between 1852 and 1905.

The district included:

- 107–109 West Main St., "built by the distilling firm of J.T.S. Brown and Sons, who, under several different titles including Brown, Foreman, and Company, had occupied two different

structures on the north side of the 100 block", a buildijng of Chicago School design by D.X. Murphy

- House of Weller, 121 W. Main Street, separately listed on the National Register in 1979

- 123 West Main Street, which had housed the Galt House Hotel, a hotel of international reputation developed by Norbourne A. Galt. The hotel was located originally (from 1835 to 1865) at 125–127 West Main and 129-31 West Main Street, then expanded in 1861 to what is now 123 West Main. (With the expansion (?) designed by D.X. Murphy (HMDB source))
- Trade Mart Building, 131 W. Main Street, a.k.a. the Louisville and Nashville Railroad Office Building, separately listed in 1973

== Fire ==
On July 6, 2015, a fire partially destroyed three of the Whiskey Row buildings extending from 111 to 115 W. Main Street. Developers vowed to continue redeveloping the properties. The accidental fire began in the basement of one of the buildings that were at the time being renovated. The workers who had been renovating the building were trying to peel away old cast iron piping by using acetylene torches and grinders. According to Maj. Henry Ott, of the Louisville Fire Department, he believes that the slag left behind from these tools dropped and smoldered. Once the fire started from the basement, it made its way up to the rest of the building and across to the two others. Thankfully, the buildings were vacant and there were no injuries.

== Development ==
As of 2014, some or all of the Whiskey Row buildings had been renovated into Old Forester Distillery (its original 1880s home at 119 West Main Street), luxury apartments, restaurants, and retail businesses. When the entire Whiskey Row project would be finished, the 100th block of Main Street was projected to include a distillery tourist attraction, two upscale hotels, and a huge retail outlet.

== Gallery ==
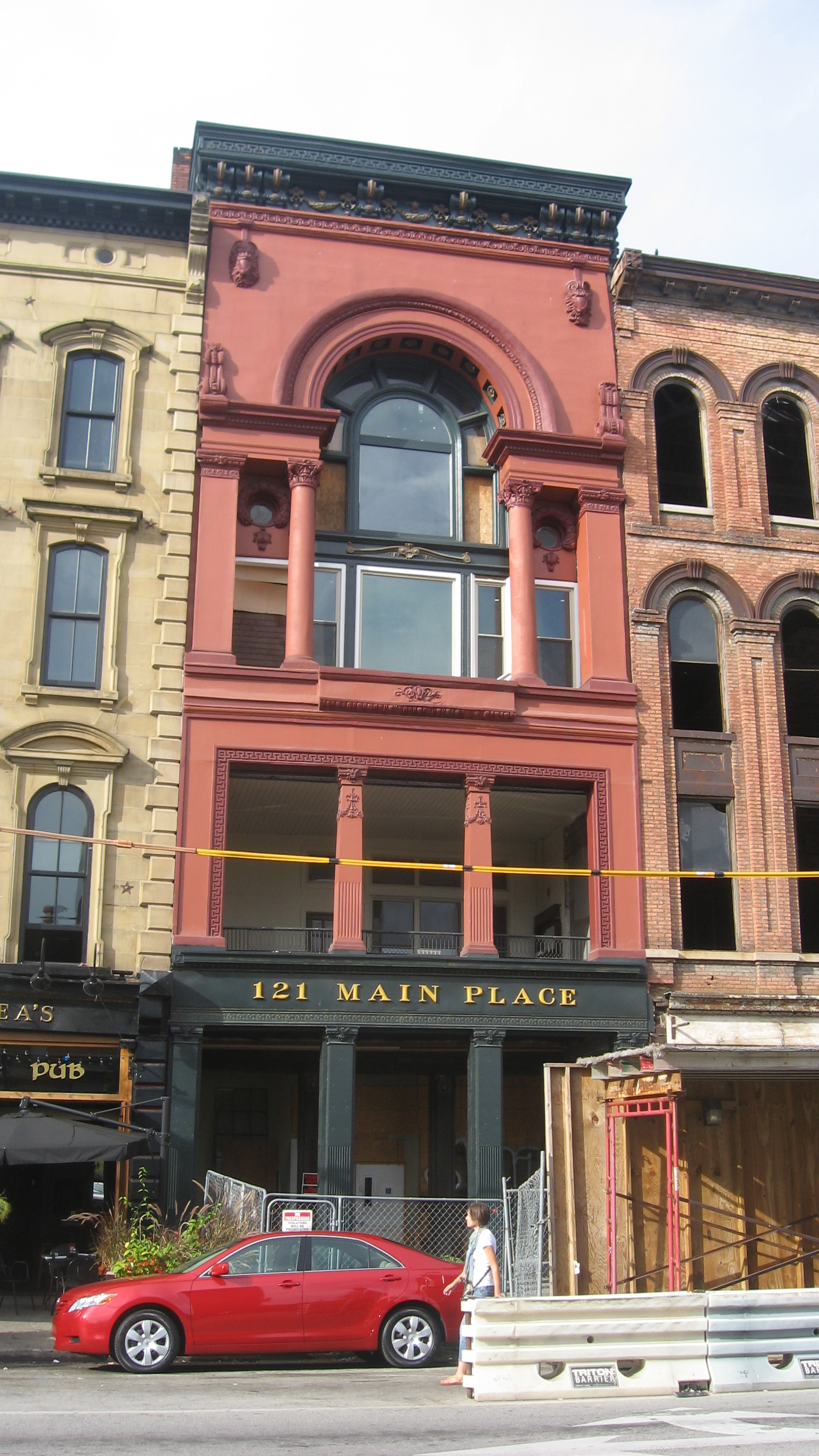
Front of the House of Weller, 121 W. Main Street

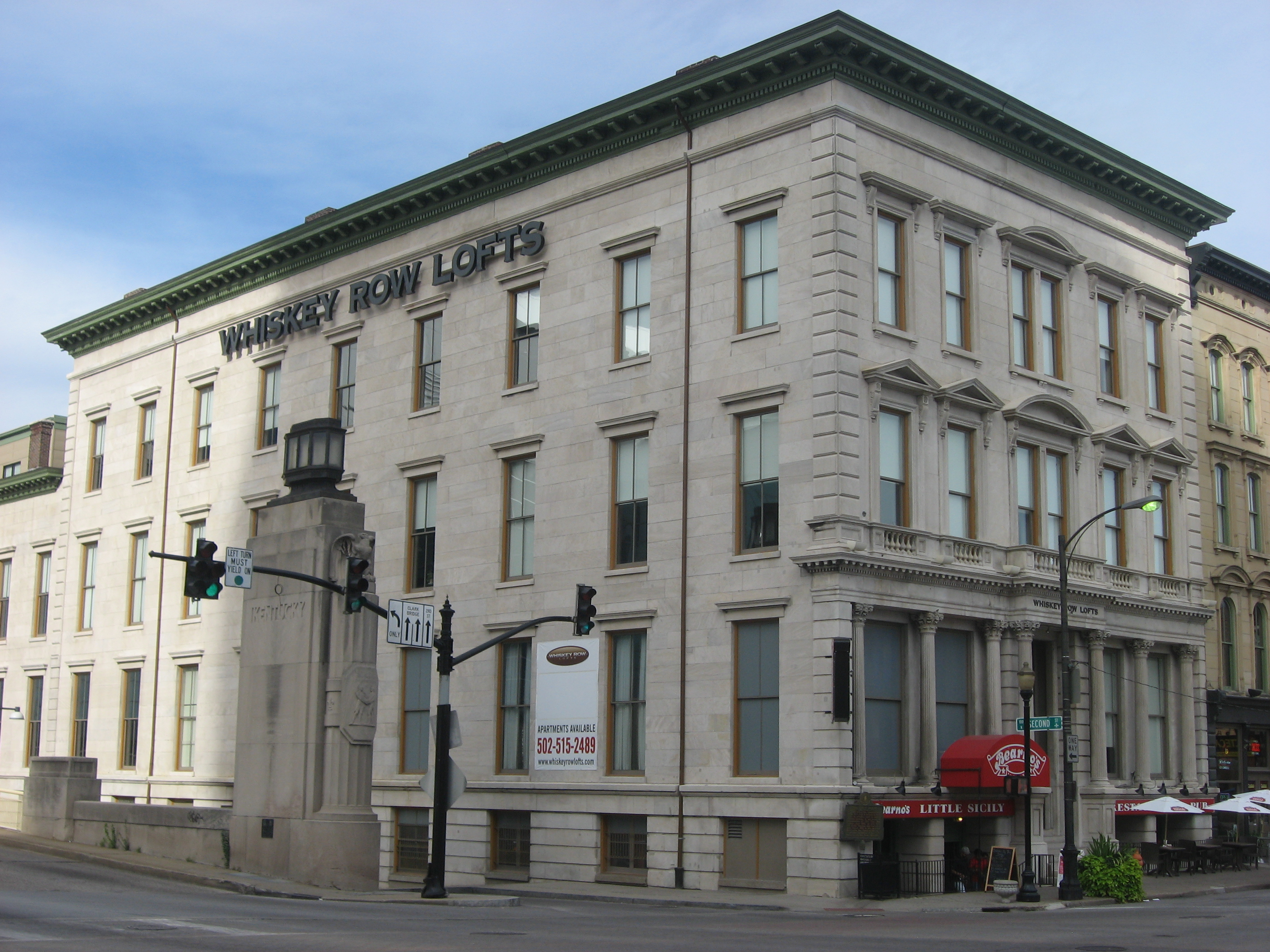
Front and western side of the Trade Mart Building, 131 W. Main Street

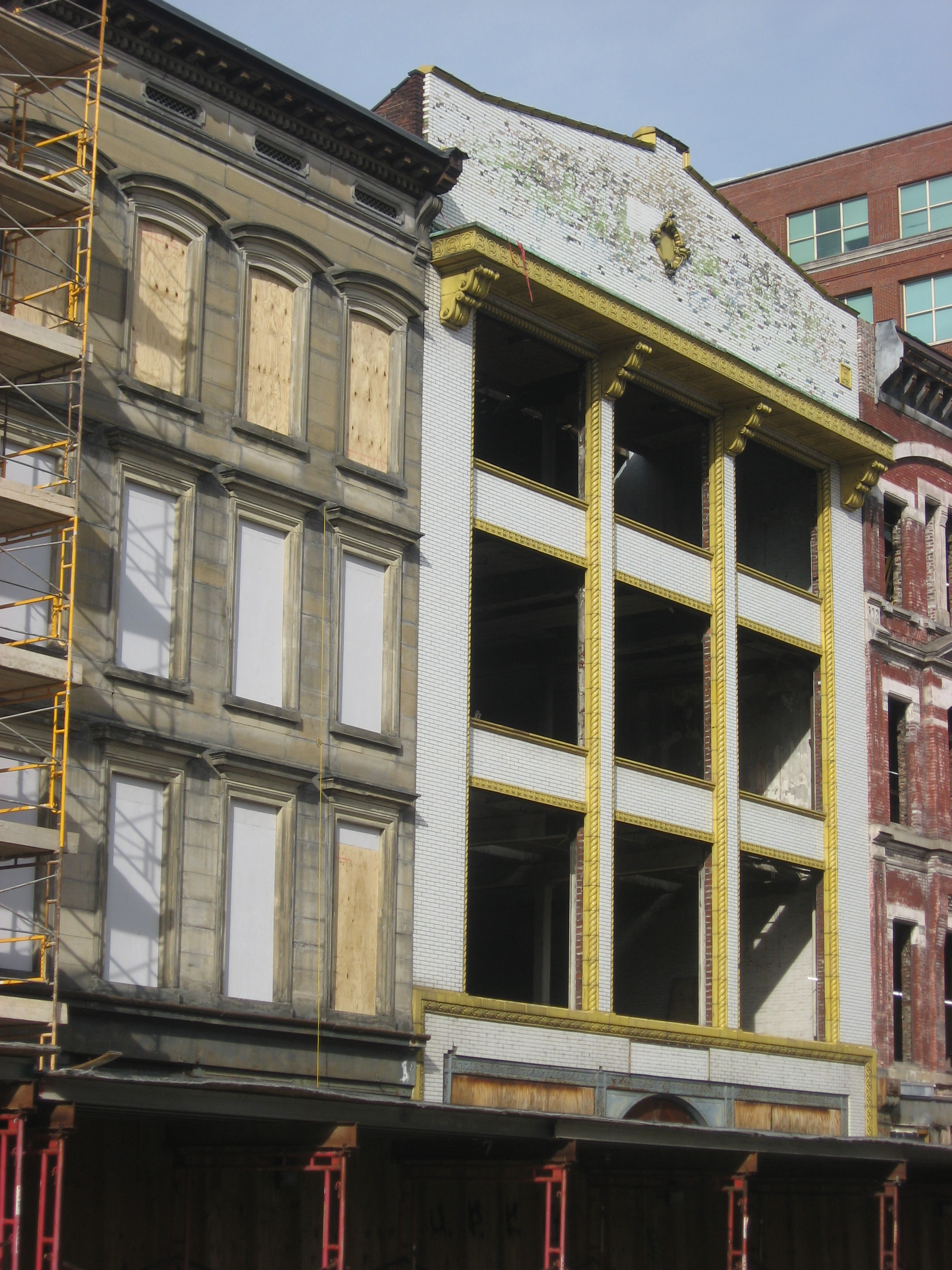
Front of the buildings in the J.T.S. Brown and Son's Complex, 105–109 E. Main Street

== See also ==
- List of attractions and events in the Louisville metropolitan area
- West Main District (Louisville)
- Henry Whitestone and D.X. Murphy, architects of a number of the distillery buildings
- National Register of Historic Places listings in Downtown Louisville, Kentucky
