= Stemmery =

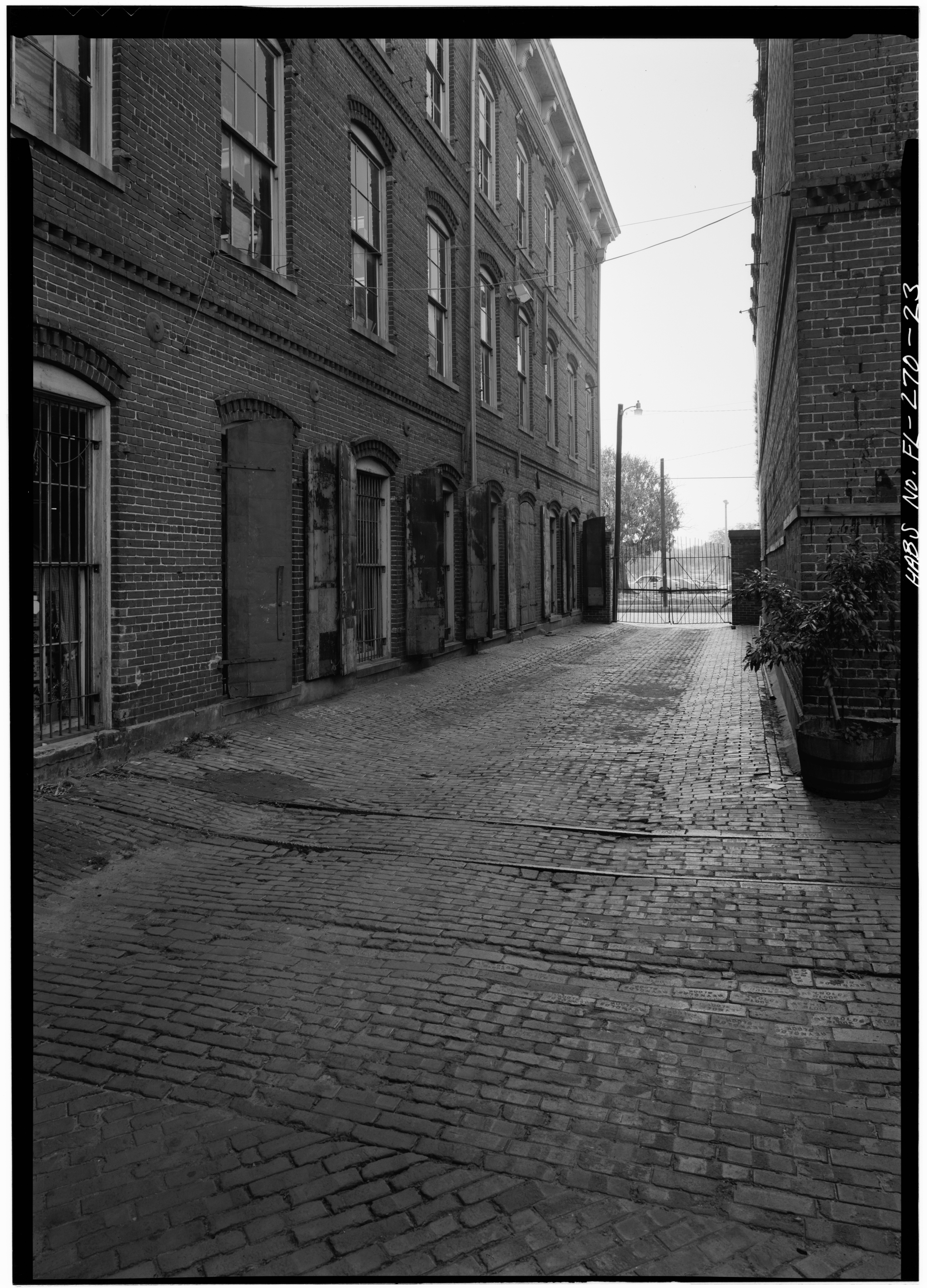
Alley between a stemmery (left) and bonded warehouse in Ybor City, Florida

A stemmery is a building where tobacco leaves are stripped for the production of tobacco products. The name is an Americanism dating to the mid-late 1850s. Stemmeries often employed African-American laborers.

== Labor issues ==
Many stemmery workers were African Americans from the antebellum period (when slaves were used) to the post-Civil War era, when African-American workers were employed for the lower-waged and lower-skilled work carried out at stemmeries. The work was typically seasonal following the tobacco harvest.

In 1942, African-American workers at Larus and Brother Company tried to negotiate better pay through their union representative, but the company fended off the discrimination claim by saying that, while these workers made less than white workers, they performed a different job function, as they were confined to working in the stemmery rather than in the main factory. The segregated work structure and uneven pay scale was allowed to continue.

Moranda Smith, a labor organizer in the 1940s, won a substantial settlement for workers, including those at stemmeries in Winston-Salem. Her efforts also resulted in the doubling of the minimum wage.

== Locations ==
Floor plan of the Ybor Cigar Factory, showing the stemmery in the lower left

According to a 1903 Kentucky Bureau of Labor report there were several stemmeries in Owensboro.

Significant stemmeries include:

- National Tobacco Works Branch Stemmery
- Stemmery building at American Cigar Company (Norfolk, Virginia)
- W. B. Lewis & Sons Tobacco stemmery building in the Darlington Industrial Historic District
