= Home of the Innocents =

Nonprofit shelter and pediatric center in Louisville, Kentucky

The Home of the Innocents is a nonprofit shelter and pediatric convalescent center in Louisville, Kentucky.

== Purpose ==
Home of the Innocents enriches the lives of children and families with hope, health, and happiness.

== Services ==
The Home operates the Kosair Charities Pediatric Convalescent Center (KCPCC), a skilled nursing facility, providing short-term, long-term, and respite care for children from birth to age 21.

The Home provides residential care for children who have been abused, neglected or abandoned. This includes emergency shelter services when a child is removed from an unsafe situation.

Additional Community Services are available for children and families not living on the Home's campus. These services help with the transition to independent living and adulthood by providing a healthy environment for young adults to become successful parents, and for family relationships to move into a better place.

In 2020 the Home served about 13,000 children and families.

== History ==
It was founded on April 23, 1880, by a special act of the Kentucky General Assembly and charged to "provide for the comfort and care of children of poor families and for destitute mothers". It was first located at 108 West Broadway and led by Dr. James Taylor Helm, in cooperation with Christ Church Cathedral.

In 1930 it merged with the Protestant Episcopal Orphan Asylum, and moved into a former Durrett family mansion at 202 East Chestnut in 1942, a facility capable of housing 18 children at a time. The property was sold in 1969 for an expansion of Norton Children's Hospital, and the Home of the Innocents moved to 505 East Chestnut, where capacity was gradually increased from 30 to 90 children by 1987. In 1975, the Home of the Innocents assumed the pediatric nursing services formerly provided by the old Louisville Jewish Convalescent Children's Home.

On March 5, 1999, the Home purchased the 20.5-acre (83,000 m^{2}) Bourbon Stockyards site for $3.4 million, located east of Downtown Louisville in the Butchertown neighborhood. The Home constructed a $25 million campus on this site, funded by a capital campaign that included a $6.2 million donation from Kosair Charities. In 2008 the Home entered the final stretch of a $26 million capital campaign for substantial expansion and improvements.

== Campus ==
The campus includes 8 acres (32,000 m^{2}) of green space.
