= Jefferson County Jail (Louisville, Kentucky) =

- U.S. National Register of Historic Places
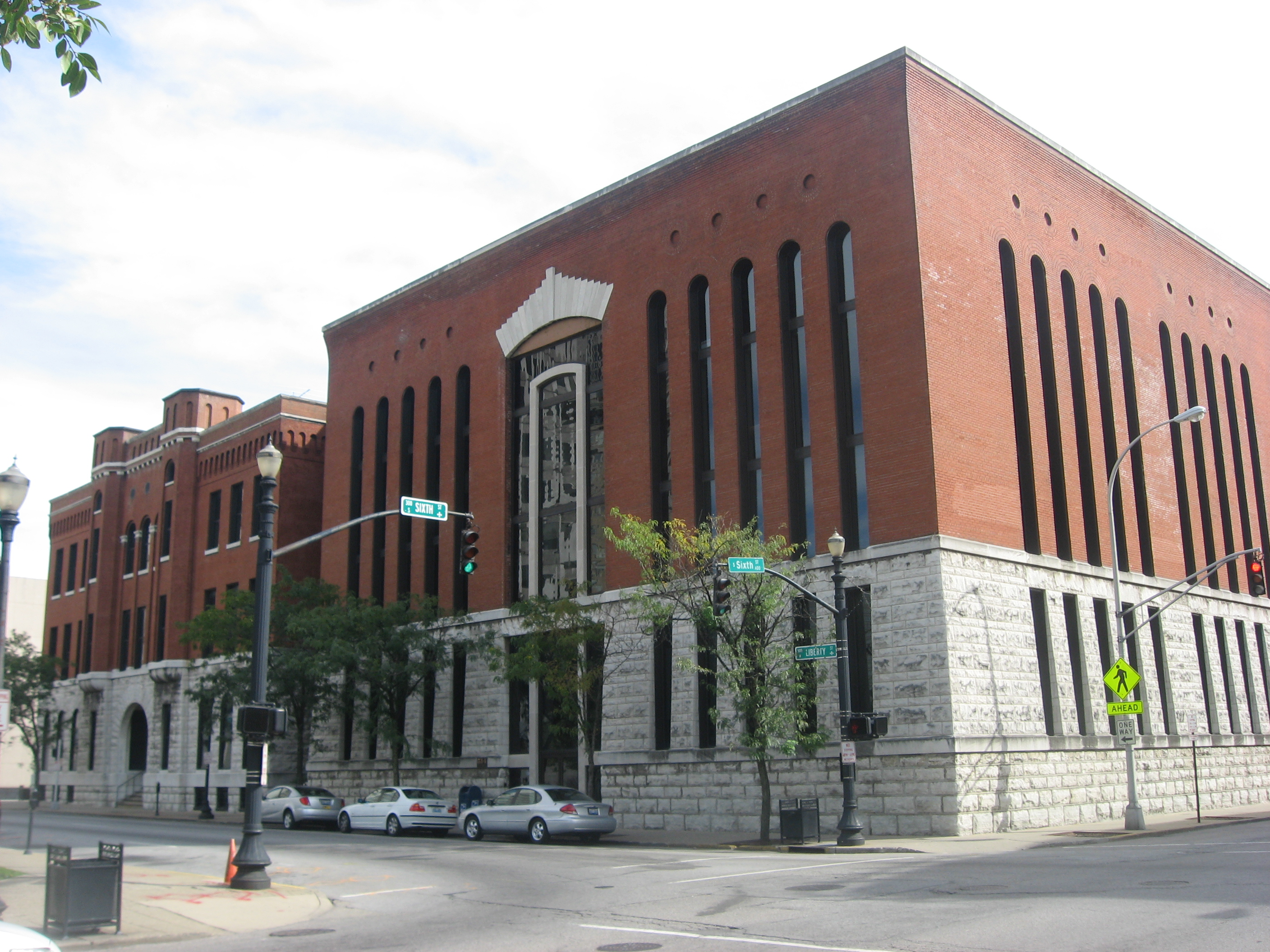
- Front of the jail

- Location within Kentucky Location within the United States
- Location: 514 W. Liberty St., Louisville, Kentucky
- Coordinates: 38°15′11″N 85°45′36″W
- Area: 9.9 acres (4.0 ha)
- Built: 1905
- Architect: D.X. Murphy & Bros.
- Architectural style: Chicago
- NRHP reference No.: 73000808
- Added to NRHP: July 16, 1973

The Jefferson County Jail is a historic structure in central Louisville, Kentucky, United States. Built in 1905 in the Chicago style of architecture, it was designed by D.X. Murphy & Bros. It comprises two wings: the western, built as cell blocks, and the eastern, which originally housed offices. A system of corridors was used to separate male and female prisoners and black and white prisoners.

In 1983, the jail was converted into an office complex. Among its tenants are the offices of the Commonwealth's Attorney, the office of the Circuit Court Clerk, and the Jefferson County Public Law Library. While prisoners are no longer held in the jail, it is still significant as a leading example of public-works architecture. Its structure has been admired by many leading architects, including the renowned Finnish-American Eero Saarinen. In 1973, the jail was listed on the National Register of Historic Places for its architectural significance.
