= National Register of Historic Places listings in Simpson County, Kentucky =

Location of Simpson County in Kentucky

This is a list of the National Register of Historic Places listings in Simpson County, Kentucky.

This is intended to be a complete list of the properties and districts on the National Register of Historic Places in Simpson County, Kentucky, United States. The locations of National Register properties and districts for which the latitude and longitude coordinates are included below, may be seen in a map.

There are 14 properties and districts listed on the National Register in the county.

This National Park Service list is complete through NPS recent listings posted December 12, 2025.

== Current listings ==
	Name on the Register	Image	Date listed	Location	City or town	Description
1	The Cedars	The Cedars	January 11, 1996 (#95001516)	812 E. Cedar St. 36°43′05″N 86°33′28″W	Franklin	
2	Duncan House	Duncan House	October 29, 1982 (#82001576)	301 N. Main St. 36°43′27″N 86°34′39″W	Franklin	
3	Franklin Downtown Commercial District	Franklin Downtown Commercial District	February 17, 1983 (#83002873)	Roughly Main and College Sts. between Washington and Madison Sts.; also 200 S. Main and 207 S. College Sts. 36°43′22″N 86°34′43″W	Franklin	Second set of boundaries represents a boundary increase of August 18, 1983
4	Franklin Grade and High School	Franklin Grade and High School	February 3, 2010 (#09001312)	513 W. Madison St. 36°43′18″N 86°35′02″W	Franklin	
5	Goodnight House	Goodnight House	August 12, 1977 (#77000647)	201 S. Main St. 36°43′15″N 86°34′40″W	Franklin	
6	Hampton Hall		January 11, 1996 (#95001519)	6240 Bowling Green Rd. 36°48′46″N 86°33′05″W	Franklin	
7	Hargis House	Hargis House	January 11, 1996 (#95001518)	300 E. Cedar St. 36°43′17″N 86°34′28″W	Franklin	
8	Harristown Historic District	Harristown Historic District	January 11, 1996 (#95001515)	Roughly bounded by Walker Ave., Bell St., W. Washington St., and West St. 36°43′35″N 86°35′07″W	Franklin	
9	Randolph Gilbert Moore House	Randolph Gilbert Moore House	January 11, 1996 (#95001517)	321 S. College St. 36°43′03″N 86°34′48″W	Franklin	
10	Octagon Hall	Octagon Hall	April 10, 1980 (#80001667)	Northeast of Franklin on U.S. Route 31W; 36°48′25″N 86°33′25″W	Franklin	
11	Simpson County Courthouse	Simpson County Courthouse	March 18, 1980 (#80001668)	Kentucky Route 73; 36°43′21″N 86°34′42″W	Franklin	
12	Sinking Creek Cave System		April 28, 1983 (#83002875)	Address Restricted	Franklin	
13	Triple Pine Farm		January 11, 1996 (#95001520)	5945 Bowling Green Rd. 36°48′01″N 86°33′54″W	Franklin	
14	West Cedar Street Historic District	West Cedar Street Historic District	January 11, 1996 (#95001514)	Northern and southern sides of W. Cedar St. between N. High and West Sts. 36°43′21″N 86°35′06″W	Franklin	

== See also ==
- List of National Historic Landmarks in Kentucky
- National Register of Historic Places listings in Kentucky
