= Salmons, Kentucky =

Unincorporated community in Kentucky, United States

Salmons
- Unincorporated community
- Location within the state of Kentucky Salmons (the United States)
- Coordinates: 36°46′42″N 86°33′47″W
- Country: United States
- State: Kentucky
- County: Simpson
- Elevation: 676 ft (206 m)
- Time zone: UTC-6 (Central (CST))
  - Summer (DST): UTC-5 (CDT)
- GNIS feature ID: 502815

Salmons is an unincorporated community in Simpson County, Kentucky, United States. It lies along U.S. Route 31W north of the city of Franklin, the county seat of Simpson County. Its elevation is 676 feet (206 m).
