= Sevier County Courthouse =

Sevier County Courthouse may refer to:

- Sevier County Courthouse (Tennessee), listed on the National Register of Historic Places in Sevier County
- Sevier County Courthouse (Utah), formerly listed on the National Register of Historic Places in Sevier County, Utah
