= Carolyn Conn Moore =

American politician

Member of the Kentucky Senate from the 5th district
- In office November 1949 – January 1, 1952
- Preceded by: J. Lee Moore
- Succeeded by: James R. Mansfield

Personal details
- Born: Carolyn Conn; January 7, 1904 Adairville, Kentucky, U.S.
- Died: January 14, 1985 (aged 81)
- Party: Democratic
- Spouse: J. Lee Moore

Carolyn Conn Moore (January 7, 1904 – January 14, 1986) was an American politician from Franklin, Kentucky who became the first woman to serve in the Kentucky Senate when in November 1949 she won a special election to replace her husband, J. Lee Moore, in the legislature after his death.

== Family and career ==
Moore was married to J. Lee Moore, who was an attorney and legislator.

Moore was active in the Franklin County PTA and served as vice president of the Kentucky Congress of Parents and Teachers.

== Kentucky Senate ==
After the death of her husband in 1949, Carolyn ran unopposed in a special election to fill her husband's seat in the 5th District seat representing Simpson County, Kentucky.

On March 25, 1950, the Kentucky General Assembly passed a motion that placed a plaque "on the desk occupied by Mrs. J. Lee Moore, the first woman member in the Senate of the Commonwealth of Kentucky."

After she completed the term, she took a job with the Democratic National Headquarters. She traveled the country speaking to women about political issues.

== Later life and legacy ==
Later Moore worked as a recruiter for Belmont College in Tennessee. Moore moved to Tuscaloosa and worked as a housemother at Alpha Delta Gamma sorority. She continued working in politics through the League of Women Voters.
