= The Cedars (Franklin, Kentucky) =

- U.S. National Register of Historic Places
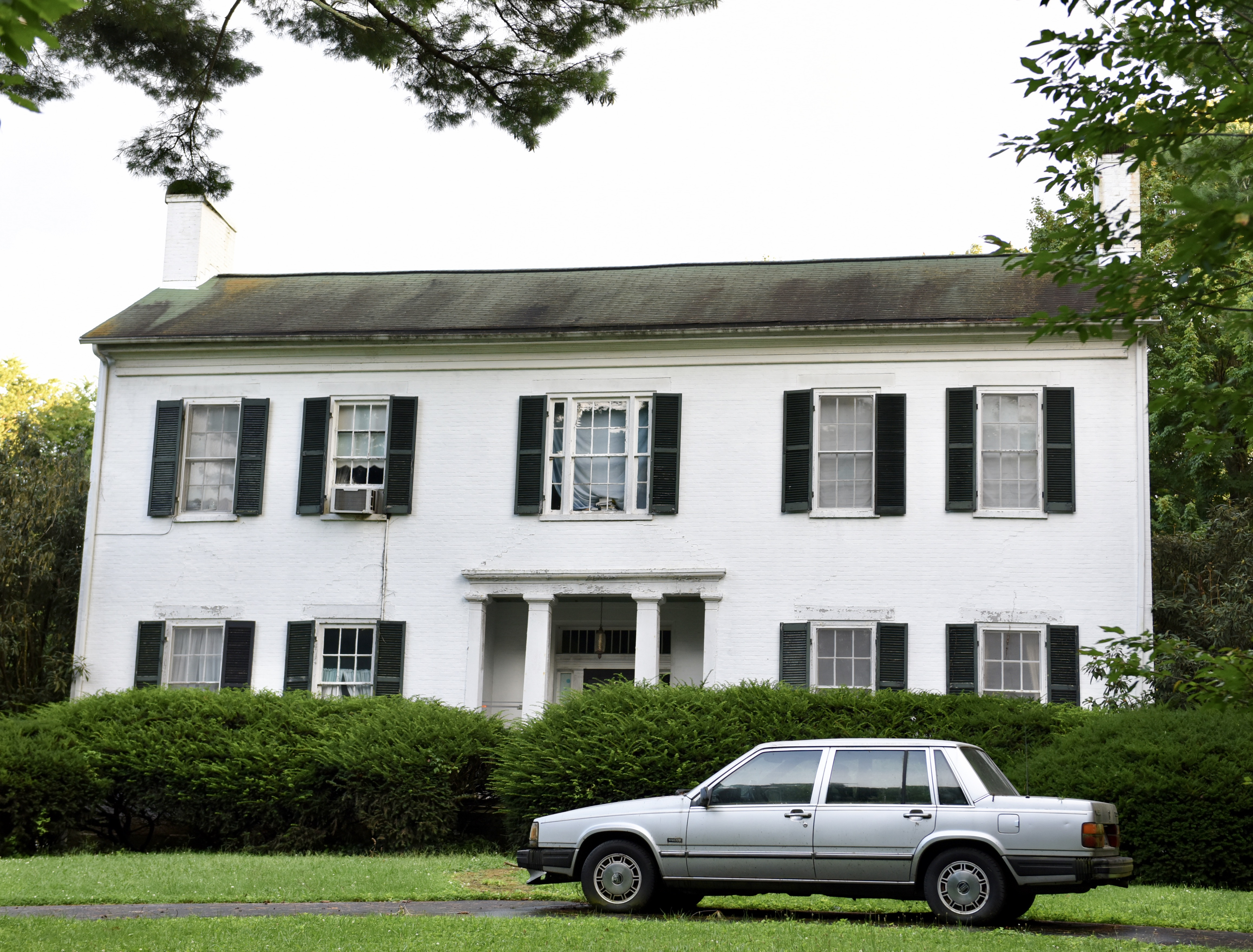

- Location within Kentucky Location within the United States
- Location: 812 E. Cedar St., Franklin, Kentucky
- Coordinates: 36°43′05″N 86°33′28″W
- Area: 47 acres (19 ha)
- Built: 1836
- Built by: Nathan Salmons
- Architectural style: Greek Revival, Bungalow/craftsman
- NRHP reference No.: 95001516
- Added to NRHP: January 11, 1996

The Cedars in Franklin, Kentucky, located at 812 E. Cedar St., in Franklin, in Simpson County, is a historic house built in 1836. It was listed on the National Register of Historic Places in 1996.

The listing included 11 contributing buildings and a contributing site on 47 acres (19 ha).

The main building is the two-story Greek Revival house, built in 1836. This "features minimal wood detailing, typical of this early style and period of construction."

== See also ==
- The Cedars (Leitchfield, Kentucky), in Grayson County, also NRHP-listed
