= Prices Mill, Kentucky =

Unincorporated community in Kentucky, United States

Prices Mill
- Unincorporated community
- Location within the state of Kentucky Prices Mill (the United States)
- Coordinates: 36°40′53″N 86°43′48″W
- Country: United States
- State: Kentucky
- County: Simpson
- Elevation: 574 ft (175 m)
- Time zone: UTC-6 (Central (CST))
  - Summer (DST): UTC-5 (CDT)
- GNIS feature ID: 501328

Prices Mill is an unincorporated community in Simpson County, Kentucky, United States. It lies along Route 591 on the Little West Fork of the Red River, southwest of the city of Franklin, the county seat of Simpson County. Its elevation is 574feet (175m). The old mill from which the community took its name was on the south bank of the river, just across a small street from the Prices Mill Store. The old Prices Mill Store was located just off the Adairville Road on a short and then-unnamed street now called The Prices Mill Loop. The Prices Mill Store was operated at one time by (among many others) Val and Pauline Donnell, parents of noted Simpson County historian Dorothy Donnell Steers of Franklin, KY.
