= Goodnight House =

Historic house in Franklin, Kentucky

- U.S. National Register of Historic Places
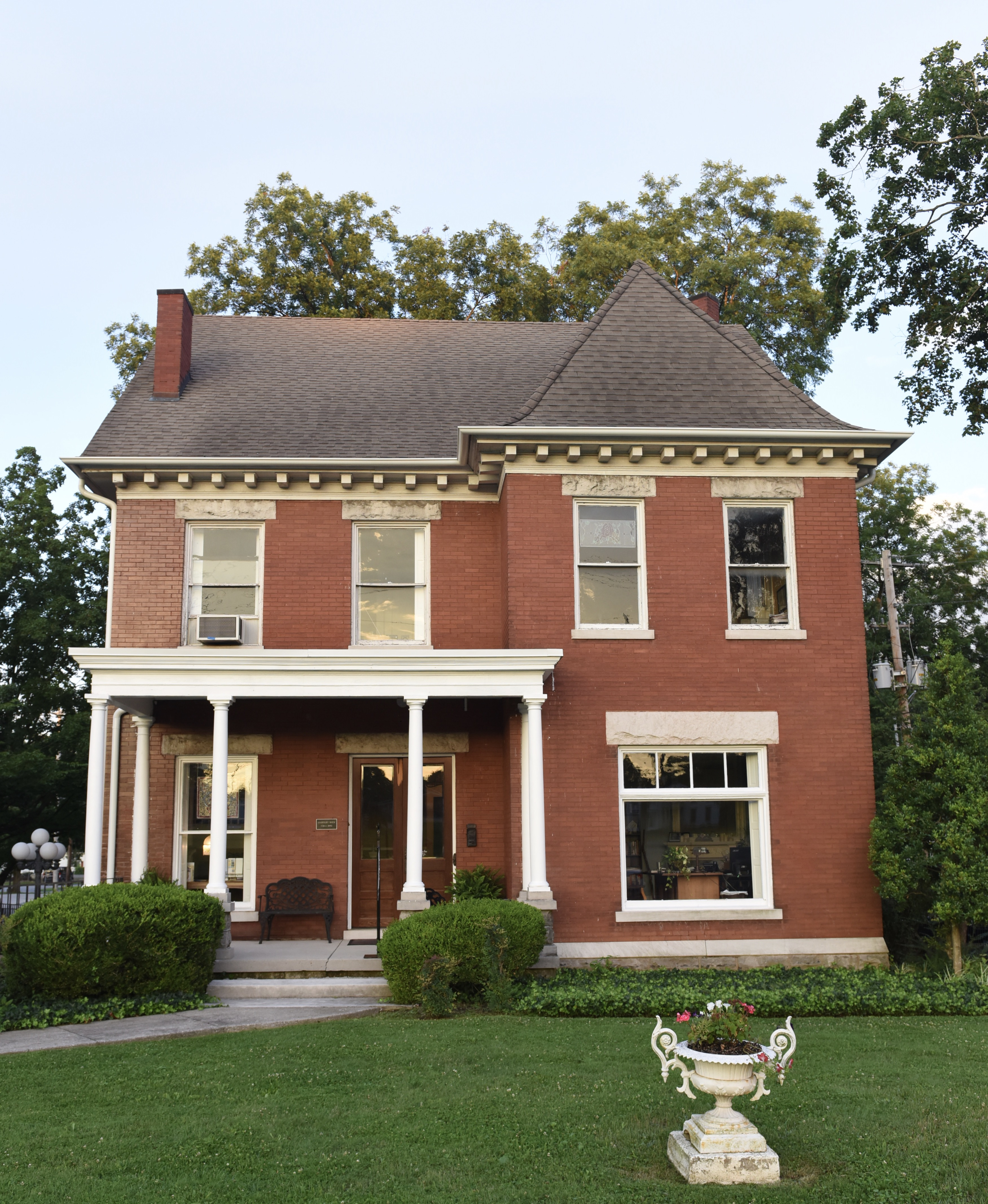

- Location within Kentucky Location within the United States
- Location: 201 S. Main St., Franklin, Kentucky
- Coordinates: 36.72101°N 86.57789°W
- Area: 1 acre (0.40 ha)
- Built: 1893
- Architect: McDonald Brothers
- Architectural style: Late Victorian
- NRHP reference No.: 77000647
- Added to NRHP: August 12, 1977

The Goodnight House, at 201 S. Main St. in Franklin, Kentucky, was built in 1893. It was listed on the National Register of Historic Places in 1977. Designed by the McDonald Brothers, it is Late Victorian in style. It has also been known as the Judge Isaac Herschel Goodnight & Mrs. Ella Hoy Goodnight House and was home of Isaac Herschel Goodnight, who served three terms in the United States House of Representatives from 1889 to 1895. After that, he returned to his law practice in Franklin, and later became judge of Kentucky's 7th Circuit Court District.

The home is located on the southeast corner of S. Main St. and E. Madison St. The next building to the south is the Goodnight Memorial Library. Across E. Madison St. begins the National Register-listed Franklin Downtown Commercial District.

The Goodnight House is used by the Franklin Simpson Chamber of Commerce. In December 2017 the chamber held a Christmas Open House event at the house.
