= Sevierville Commercial Historic District =

Historic district in Tennessee, United States

- U.S. National Register of Historic Places
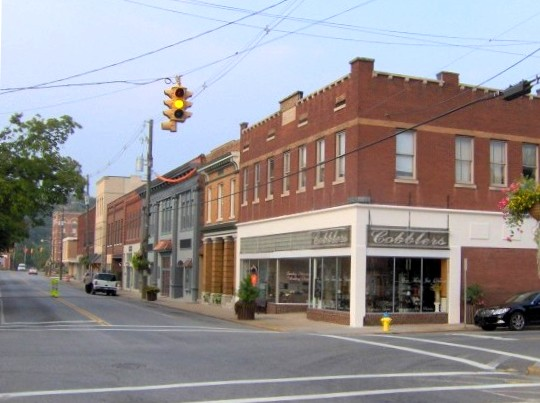

- Location within Tennessee
- Location: Sections of Bruce St., Court Ave., and Commerce St., Sevierville, Tennessee
- Coordinates: 35°52′05″N 83°33′57″W
- Area: 3.5 acres (1.4 ha)
- Built: 1896
- NRHP reference No.: 86002910
- Added to NRHP: October 23, 1986

Sevierville Commercial Historic District is a 3.5 acres (1.4 ha) historic district in Sevierville, Tennessee. It has 21 contributing buildings along sections of Bruce Street, Court Avenue, and Commerce Street including the Sevier County Courthouse (which is separately NRHP-listed). The courthouse was built in 1896 one block south of the town square where the former courthouse was located.

Buildings in the district are:

1. 136 E. Bruce Street
2. 132 E. Bruce Street
3. 120 E. Bruce Street (c.1970), non-contributing
4. 118 E. Bruce Street (c.1925), one-story brick building
5. 110-114 E. Bruce Street
6. 158 Court Avenue, Yett store
7. 150 Court Avenue
8. 138-142 Court Avenue
9. 134 Court Avenue
10. 128 Court Avenue
11. 120 Court Avenue
12. 112-118 Court Avenue
13. 110 Court Avenue
14. 115-117 Court Avenue
15. 119 Court Avenue
16. 121 Court Avenue
17. 111 Commerce Street (c.1930), two-story building with a second story balcony and a stepped parapet
18. Sevier County Courthouse
19. 102 W. Bruce Street (1906), two-story brick wholesale house for the M. Yett and Son merchandise company. As of 1986, had its "original doors, arched windows and corbelled brick cornice."
20. 101 E. Bruce Street (1923), three-story building with stepped parapet, originally the First National Bank
21. 105 E. Bruce Street
22. 123-125 E. Bruce Street
23. 129 E. Bruce Street, and
24. 131 E. Bruce Street.
