= Hargis House =

- U.S. National Register of Historic Places
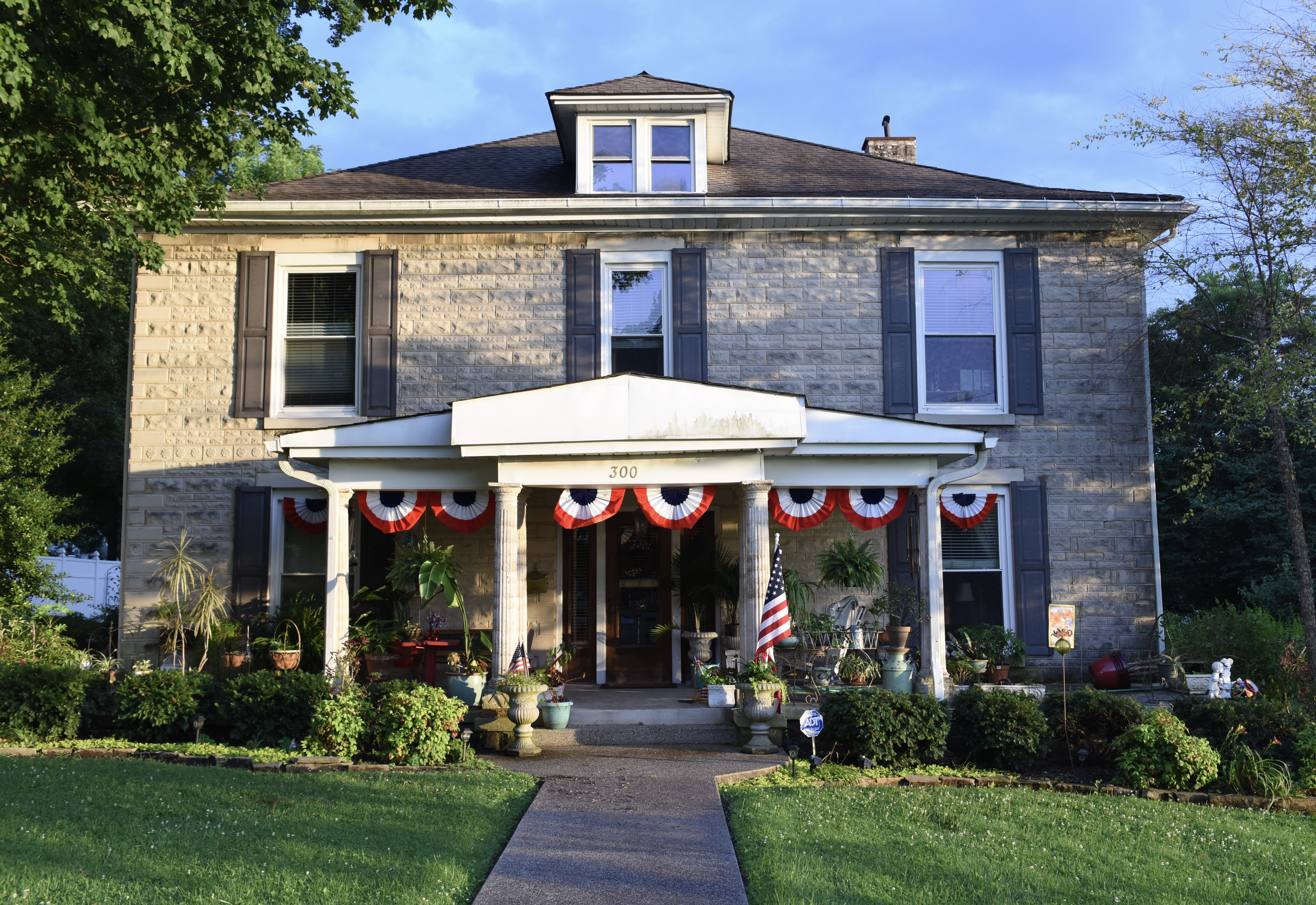

- Location within Kentucky Location within the United States
- Location: 300 E. Cedar St., Franklin, Kentucky
- Coordinates: 36°43′17″N 86°34′28″W
- Area: less than one acre
- Built: 1920
- Architect: Alex W. Brown
- Architectural style: Prairie School
- NRHP reference No.: 95001518
- Added to NRHP: January 11, 1996

The Hargis House is a historic house built in 1920 which was listed on the National Register of Historic Places in 1996. It is located at 300 E. Cedar St. in Franklin, Kentucky.

It is a two-story house built of formed stone, and has a one-story front porch with rusticated columns. It has been described as Prairie School in style and as an American Foursquare house, although it does not appear to be a pure example of either.
