= McDonald Brothers (architects) =

American architectural firm

McDonald Brothers founded in 1878 was a Louisville-based firm of architects of courthouses and other public buildings. It was a partnership of brothers Kenneth McDonald, Harry McDonald (aka Henry P. McDonald), and Donald McDonald.

== History ==
Harry McDonald was the senior member of the firm. He served in the American Civil War in the Confederate Army. He was elected to the Kentucky legislature and died while in office in 1904.

Donald McDonald graduated from Washington and Lee University in 1873.

The McDonald Brothers partnership lasted from 1874 until 1896. Kenneth McDonald practiced individually after then, until 1901.

The McDonald Brothers worked during 1896 on a redesign for the Thomas Jefferson-designed Rotunda at the University of Virginia, after it was destroyed by fire in 1895. The McDonald Brothers were already at work in Charlottesville, designing Christ Episcopal Church. For the Rotunda, they completed plans for "a new portico with cast-iron columns and a grand staircase" and also a somewhat controversial "elaborate two-story interior with multiple levels of cast-iron colonnades". The firm was fired from the job, however, after it turned out "they miscalculated the structural stability of the ruined Rotunda." Stanford White, principal of McKim, Meade and White, was brought in to replace them.

Alfred Joseph, who later founded Joseph & Joseph architects in Louisville, worked for the McDonald Brothers before also working under McDonald and Sheblessy and McDonald and Dodd (with William J. Dodd).

Many of their works survive and are listed on the U.S. National Register of Historic Places.

== Work ==
Works (with variations in attribution to both or either) include:

- Adair County Courthouse, built 1885, 500 Public Sq., Columbia, Kentucky (McDonald Brothers), NRHP-listed
- Adath Israel Temple, 834 S. 3rd St., Louisville, KY (McDonald Brothers), NRHP-listed
- Aurora City Hall, 216 Third St. and 233-237 Main St., Aurora, IN (McDonald Bros.), NRHP-listed
- One or more works in the Burlington Historic District, (Boundary Decrease, Boundary Increase), portions of Washington, Gallative, Perlate, Temperate, Garrard, Jefferson, Ohio Sts., Nicholas Ave, and Union Sq., Burlington, KY (McDonald Brothers, McCarvey Brothers), NRHP-listed
- Casey County Courthouse, Courthouse Sq., Liberty, KY (McDonald Bros.), NRHP-listed
- Carroll County Courthouse, Courthouse Sq., Carrollton, KY (H. P. McDonald, 1884),
- Christ Episcopal Church (c.1896), Charlottesville, Virginia
- Cumberland County Courthouse, Court House Sq., Toledo, IL (McDonald Brothers), NRHP-listed
- First Cumberland Presbyterian Church-McKenzie, 305 N. Stonewall St., McKenzie, TN (McDonald Bros.), NRHP-listed
- Gibson County Courthouse, Town Square, Princeton, IN (McDonald Brothers), NRHP-listed
- Goodnight House, 201 S. Main St., Franklin, KY (McDonald Brothers), NRHP-listed
- Henry County Courthouse, Jail, and Warden's House, Courthouse Sq., New Castle, KY (McDonald Brothers), NRHP-listed
- Hickman County Courthouse, Court Sq., Clinton, KY (McDonald Brothers), NRHP-listed
- Kentucky National Bank, 300 W. Main St., Louisville, KY (McDonald Brothers), NRHP-listed
- Old Eddyville Historic District, Off KY 730, Eddyville, KY (McDonald Bros.), NRHP-listed
- Old Jail, 103 Court St., Washington, GA (McDonald Brothers), NRHP-listed
- Old Stone Jail, Courthouse Sq., Carrollton, KY (H.P. McDonald, 1880)
- Sevier County Courthouse, Court Ave., Sevierville, TN (McDonald Brothers of Louisville), NRHP-listed
- Simpson County Courthouse, KY 73, Franklin, KY (McDonald Brothers), NRHP-listed
- Washington County Courthouse, Public Sq., Salem, IN (McDonald Bro.), NRHP-listed
- Bartow County Courthouse, Courthouse Sq., Cartersville, GA (McDonald, Kenneth, & Co.), NRHP-listed
- Lincliff, 6100 Longview Lane, Louisville, KY (McDonald, Kenneth), NRHP-listed
- Muhlenberg County Courthouse, Courthouse Sq., Greenville, KY (McDonald, Kenneth Sr.), NRHP-listed
- Rossmore Apartment House, 664 River City Mall, Louisville, KY (McDonald, Kenneth), NRHP-listed
- Calvary Episcopal Church, 821 S. 4th St., Louisville, KY (McDonald, Henry P.), NRHP-listed
- Jail portion (designed 1874) of NRHP-listed Owen County Courthouse and Jail, N. Thomas and N. Madison Sts., Owenton, KY (McDonald, H.P.), NRHP-listed

== McDonald and Dodd ==
- Franklin Building at 658-660 South Fourth Avenue, Louisville
- Seelbach Hotel, 500 South Fourth Street, Louisville

== Post-partnership ==
- Jefferson County Courthouse Annex (1901), 517 Court Pl., Louisville, KY (McDonald, Kenneth Sr.), NRHP-listed
