= Rossmore Apartment House =

- U.S. National Register of Historic Places
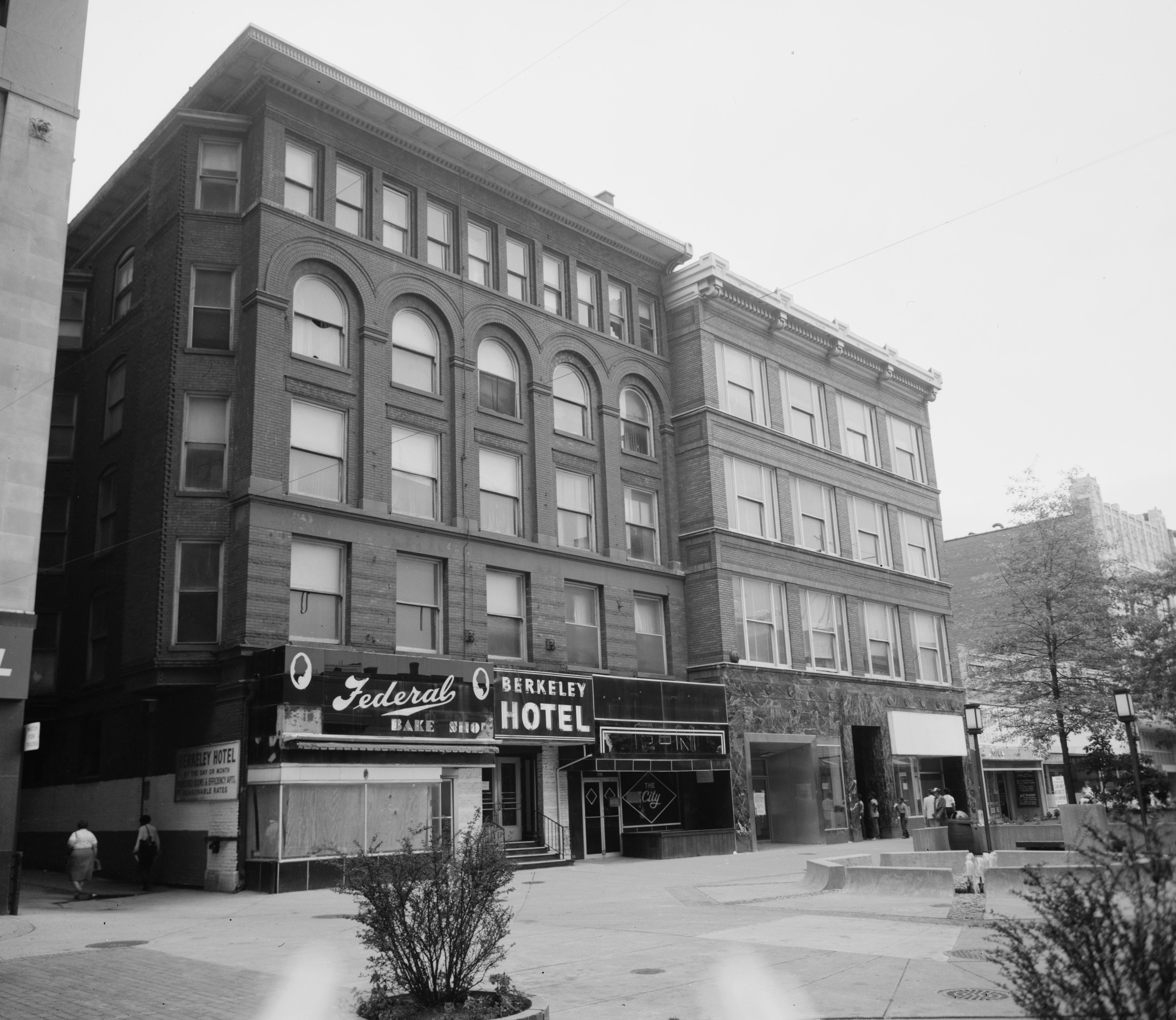
- Front of the Apartment House

- Location within Kentucky Location within the United States
- Location: 664 River City Mall, Louisville, Kentucky
- Coordinates: 38°14′50″N 85°45′31″W
- Area: 0.3 acres (0.12 ha)
- Built: 1893
- Architect: Kenneth McDonald
- Architectural style: Chicago style
- Demolished: 1981
- NRHP reference No.: 78001365
- Added to NRHP: November 14, 1978

The Rossmore Apartment House is a demolished historic building in Downtown Louisville, Kentucky, United States.

== Description ==
The Berkeley Hotel was a five-story structure of red brick with stone and rusticated brick trim. The simplicity of line and detail, the hard-edged arches of radiating bricks, and the row of oriels on the south wall are all typical of the Chicago style. The facade and some of the interior was designed by local architect Kenneth McDonald.

The interior of the building was altered over the years and very few original details remained by the 1970s. The lobby's original marble floor did survive. The original apartments each had a private hallway with the rooms opening into it. The private halls, then opened onto a long public hallway. Some elements of this design remained after the conversion to hotel. Apartments consisted of four rooms, a kitchen and a bathroom, plus a linen closet and a pantry. Each floor had private rooms at the rear for servants and the fifth floor contained storage rooms, one for each apartment.

== History ==
The building was completed in 1894 when the block of Fourth Street it is located on was still residential, but the business district was spreading south towards Broadway. Within a few decades, Fourth Street north of Broadway would become Louisville, and Kentucky's, dominant commercial district. Recognizing a trend, Alonzo J. Ross, a local grocer and entrepreneur, purchased the lot in 1893 and commissioned the building.

When it first opened it was billed as "first metropolitan apartment house". At the time, local papers praised the building for importing the style and elegance of apartment buildings in cities like Chicago.

Ross sold the building in 1901 to Theophilus Conrad, but continued to operate a grocery on the first floor until 1904. Conrad owned several local apartment buildings, including St. James Apartments in Old Louisville. The Rossmore was renamed the Raleigh Apartments for a brief time in the 1920s, but by 1923 it was listed as the Berkeley Hotel.

It was deemed historically significant in 1978 as an example of the Chicago school of architecture, as well as being one of the oldest buildings at the time in the Fourth Street commercial district.

== See also ==
- National Register of Historic Places listings in Downtown Louisville, Kentucky
