= Adair County Courthouse (Kentucky) =

- U.S. National Register of Historic Places
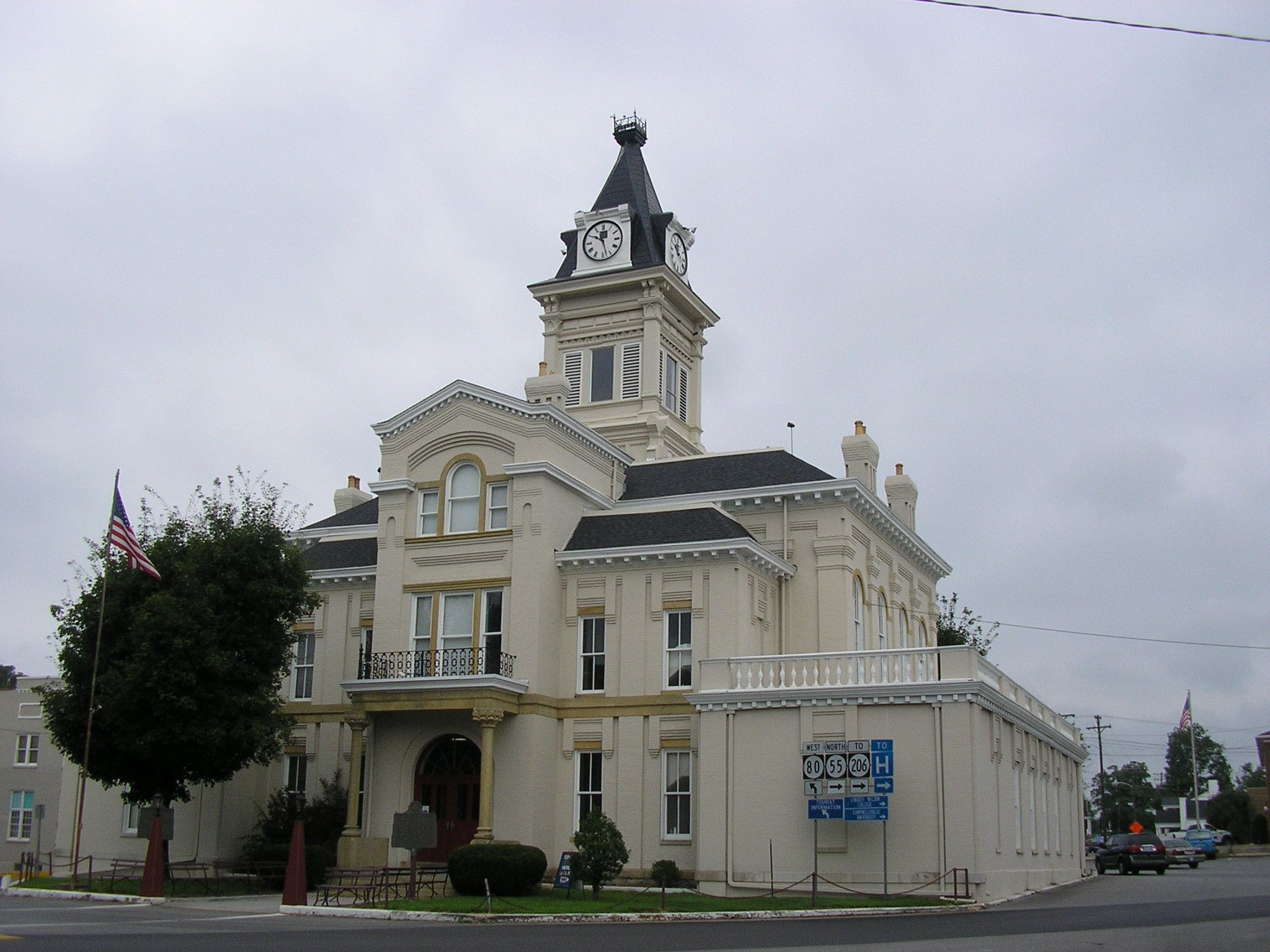

- Location within Kentucky Location within the United States
- Location: 500 Public Sq., Columbia, Kentucky
- Coordinates: 37°6′10″N 85°18′22″W
- Area: 1 acre (0.40 ha)
- Built: 1885; 135 years ago
- Built by: William Henry Hudson
- Architect: McDonald Brothers
- Architectural style: Gothic
- NRHP reference No.: 74000847
- Added to NRHP: August 27, 1974

The Adair County Courthouse in Columbia, Kentucky, a courthouse at 500 Public Sq., was built in 1885. It was listed on the National Register of Historic Places in 1974.

It was designed by McDonald Brothers. It was built by William Henry Hudson, "who was so proud of his work that he had his portrait carved in a capital on the porch."

It has a four-sided clock tower. It was deemed " one of the best preserved of major late 19th-century Kentucky courthouses."
