= Louisville Metro Hall =

- Jefferson County Courthouse
- U.S. National Register of Historic Places
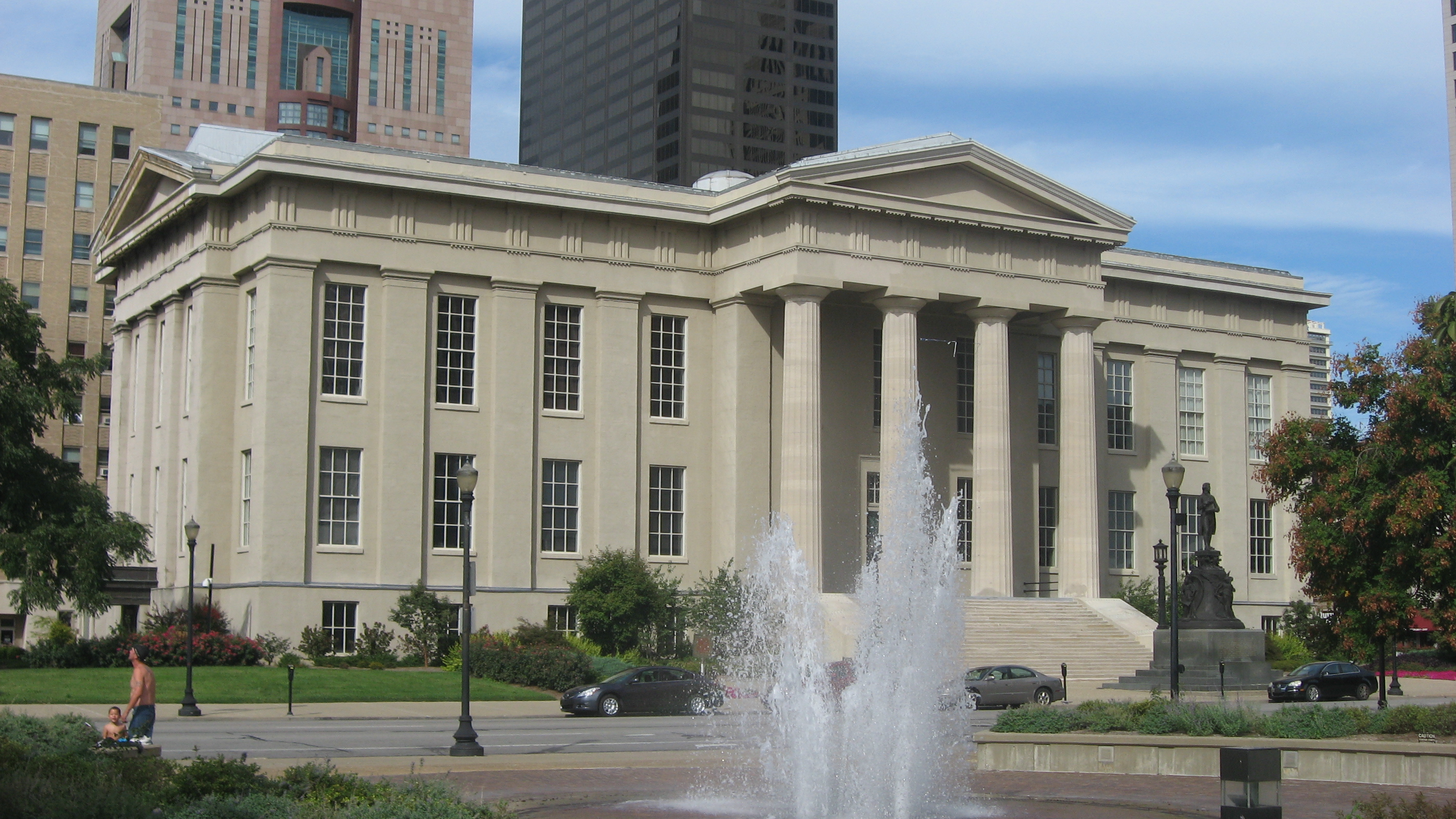
- Front of the courthouse
- Location: 527 W. Jefferson St., Louisville, Kentucky
- Coordinates: 38°15′16″N 85°45′34″W
- Built: 1835 (designed); 1836–1860 (constructed); 1842 (partly opened); 1860 (complete)
- Architect: Gideon Shryock
- Architectural style: Greek revival
- NRHP reference No.: 72000537
- Added to NRHP: April 10, 1972

The Louisville Metro Hall is the center of Louisville, Kentucky's government. It currently houses the Mayor's Office and the Jefferson County Clerk's Office for marriage licensing, delinquent tax filings, and the deeds room. The building was placed on the National Register of Historic Places in 1972. Construction began in 1836, and both the City of Louisville and Jefferson County governments starting using it in 1842.

== Design ==
The architect, Gideon Shryock, had intended for the courthouse to have a six-column Doric portico, a cupola, and additional porticos on the wings. The building would be completed by metopes and plain friezes as a full entablature, and engaged pilasters regularly sequenced. Shryock resigned from the project in 1842. It was finally completed in 1860, with Albert Fink, a bridge engineer, and Charles Stancliff in charge. Fink reduced the number of columns for the Doric portico, and did not build the additional porticos and cupola. The Louisville Daily Journal said it was an "elephantine monstrosity".

== History ==
With design occurring in 1835, construction on the courthouse began in 1836. Both the City of Louisville and Jefferson County governments began occupying a partially completed building in 1842. Slave trading was held by the courthouse in the 1840s, as were speeches calling for the abolition of slavery. When the courthouse was originally built, it was hoped that it would be the Statehouse for Kentucky. This hope was the goal of James Guthrie, but due to the capital staying in Frankfort, it became known as "Guthrie's folly". It did see some state government use during the American Civil War, when it housed the Kentucky State Legislature for a month in 1862 when Frankfort was occupied by Confederate forces.

After a fire in 1905, the building was renovated by Brinton B. Davis. When Frank Lloyd Wright visited Louisville in 1948, he referred specifically to the Courthouse when he said, "Louisville's architecture represents the quality of the old South; we should not build this type of building anymore but we should keep those we have left." This was after efforts in the 1940s to demolish it for urban renewal.

The building was listed on the National Register of Historic Places in 1972. Improvements to the building includes placing a statue of Henry Clay, designed by Joel T. Hart, on the main floors, and extensive renovations in the 1980s. The Jefferson County Courthouse Annex at 517 Court Pl. was listed on the National Register in 1980.

Louisville Metro Hall was formerly named the Jefferson County Courthouse. Since the merger of the former City of Louisville with Jefferson County, the building was renamed to Louisville Metro Hall and now primarily houses the offices of the Mayor of Louisville Metro. In addition, the offices of the Jefferson County Clerk, the Kentucky Court of Appeals and the Kentucky Supreme Court Justice for the Louisville district are located in this building.

== Statues ==
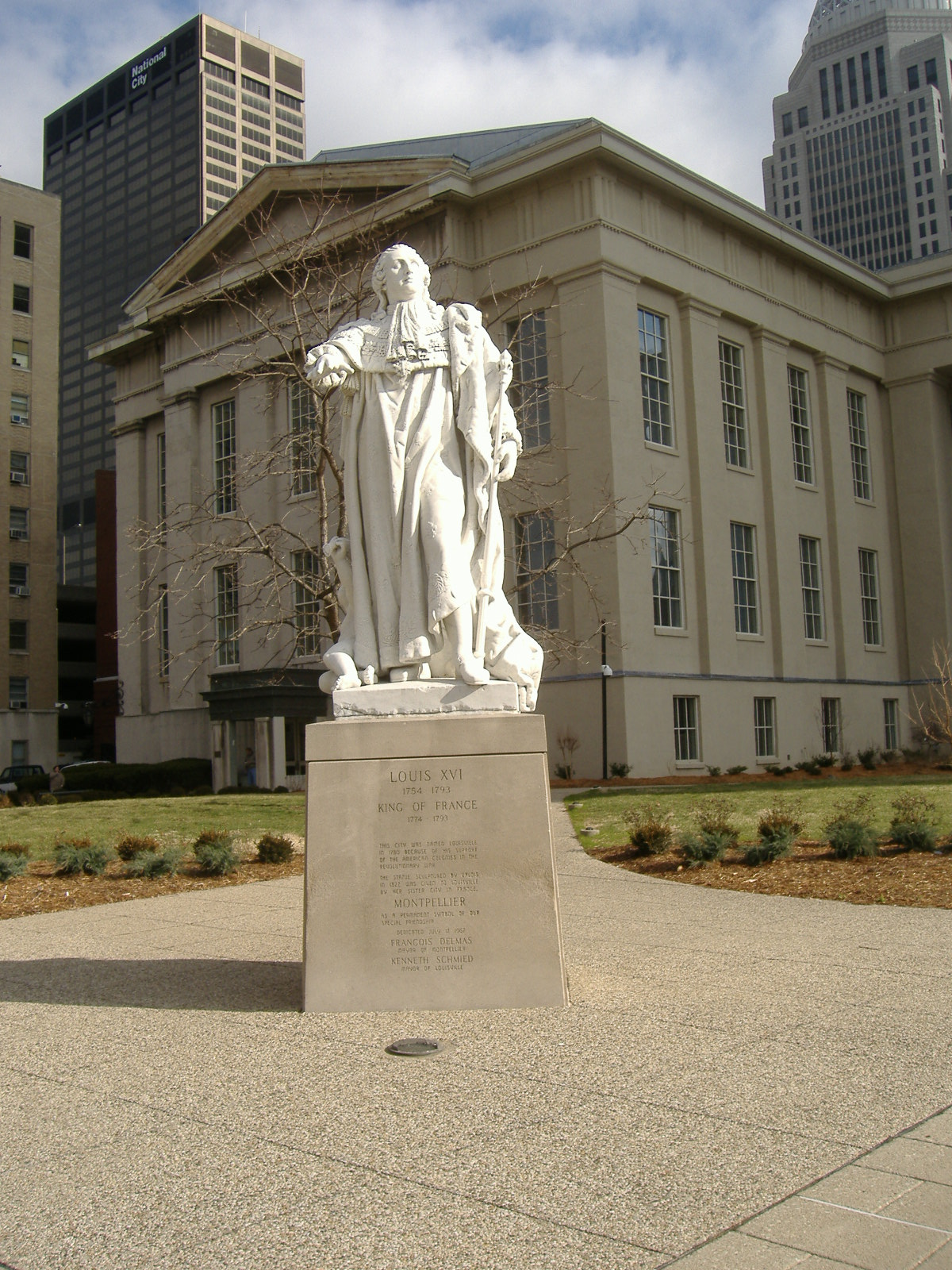
Statue of King Louis XVI

There are two prominently-sited statues outside the Courthouse. In front of the building is a statue of Thomas Jefferson by Moses Jacob Ezekiel, given to the city in 1901.

The second, on the corner of Sixth and Jefferson and across from the Louisville City Hall, is a statue of King Louis XVI. It was presented as a gift to Louisville from Louisville's sister city, Montpellier, France, on July 17, 1967. At the presentation, a crowd of 300 dignitaries, both French and American, saw Montpellier's Mayor François Delmas officially present it to Louisville Mayor Kenneth Schmied.

The statue of King Louis XVI was sculpted in 1829 by Achille-Joseph Valois for the king's surviving daughter, Marie-Thérèse, queen dowager of France, and made its public debut in Montpellier. However, a year later during the Second French Revolution, it was moved to a military base for protection, then at Montpellier University, and finally in the municipal archives' storage basement. In 1899, the statue was found to have deteriorated with a damaged arm, but remained in storage. It was decided in 1966 to give the statue to Louisville, making a seven-month journey between Montpellier and Louisville. The Carrara marble statue weighs nine tons, and is 12 feet (3.7 m) high.

The statue's right hand was destroyed in May 2020 during protests over the killing of Breonna Taylor.

== Gallery ==
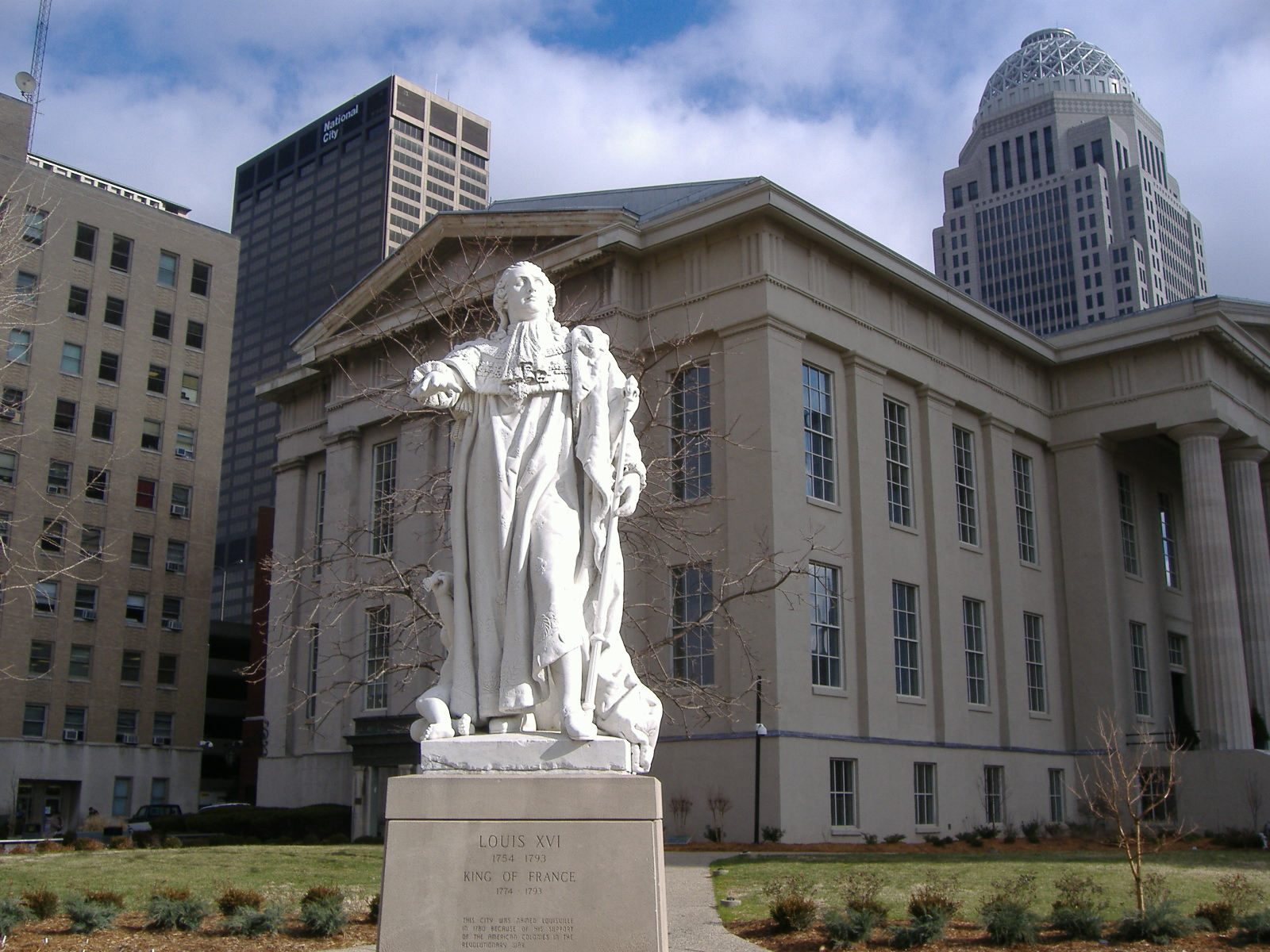
Another view of King Louis XVI statue

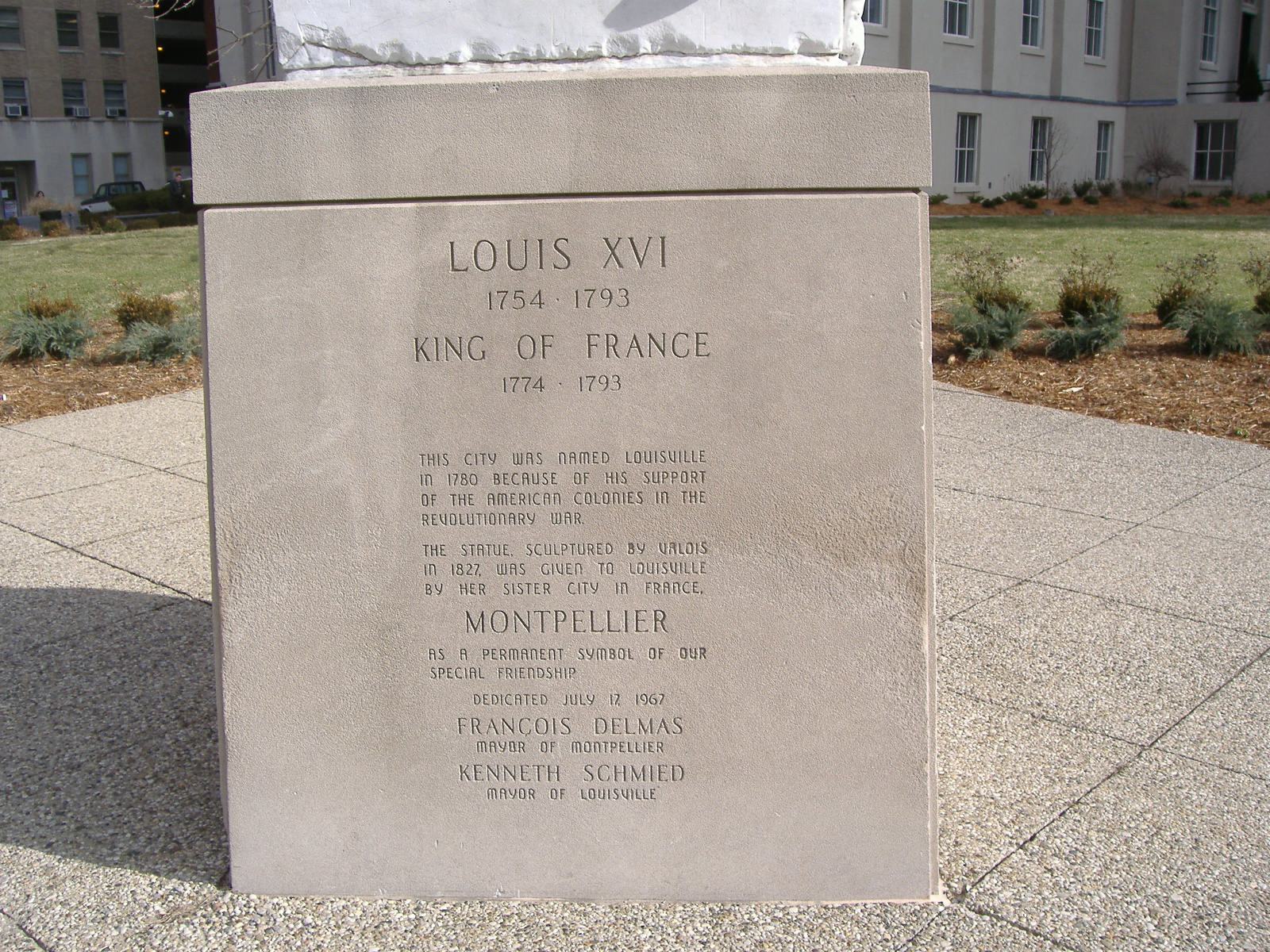
Pedestal of Louis XVI statue

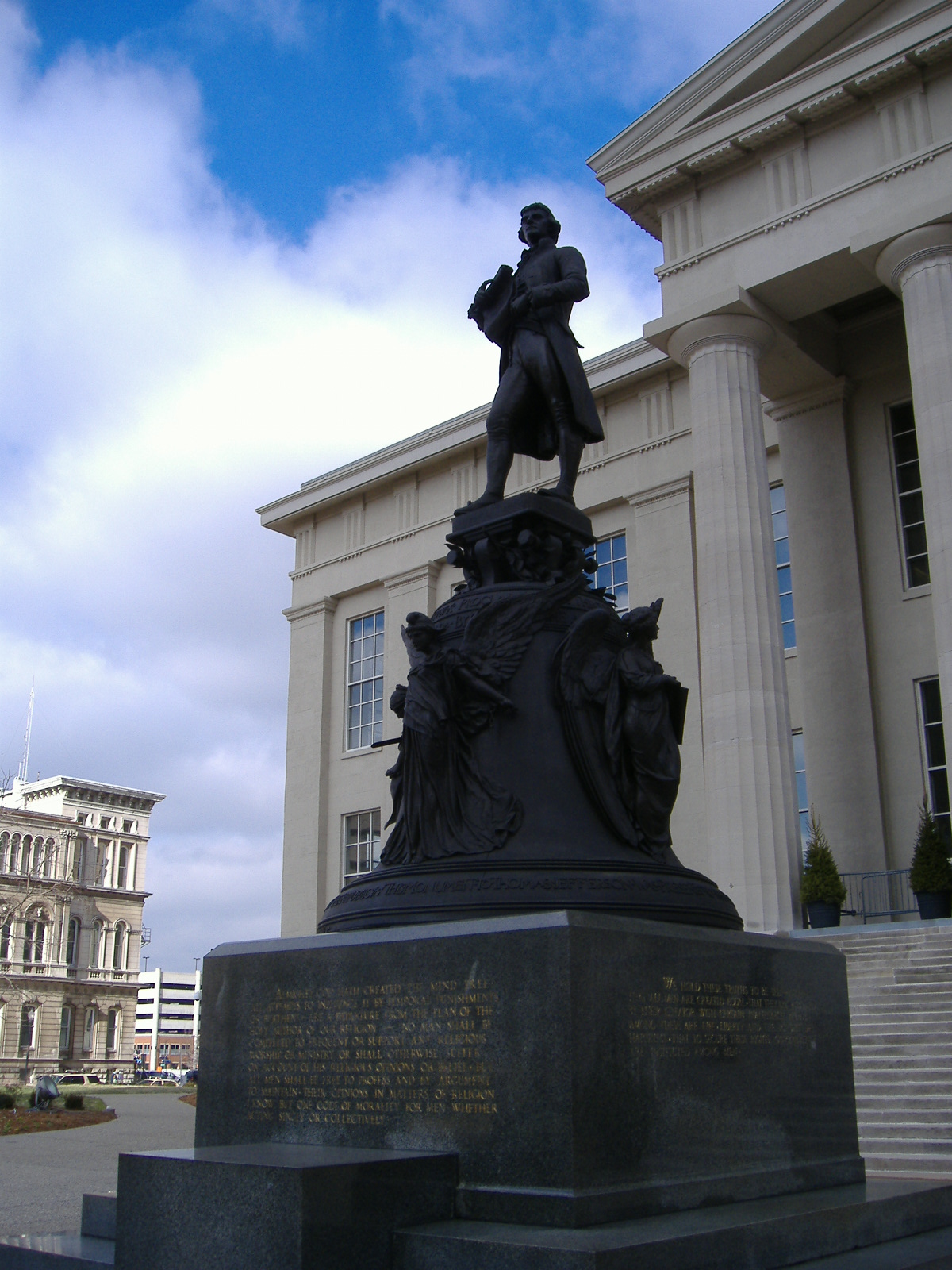
Thomas Jefferson statue

== See also ==
- List of statues of Thomas Jefferson
