= Hickman County Courthouse =

- U.S. National Register of Historic Places
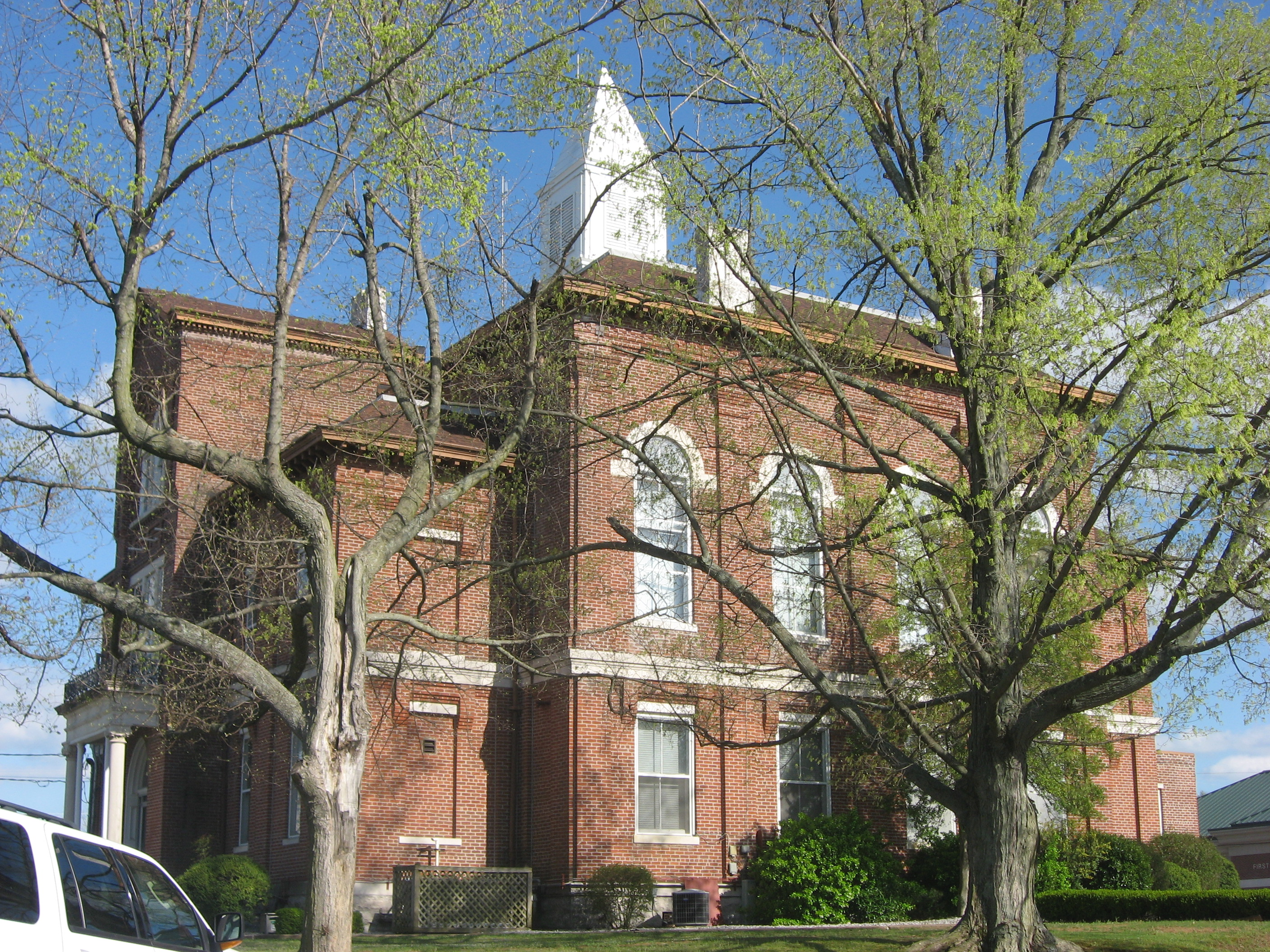

- Location within Kentucky Location within the United States
- Location: Court Sq., Clinton, Kentucky
- Coordinates: 36°40′00″N 88°59′39″W
- Area: 1 acre (0.40 ha)
- Built: 1884
- Architect: McDonald Brothers
- NRHP reference No.: 75000767
- Added to NRHP: September 11, 1975

The Hickman County Courthouse, in Clinton, Kentucky, was listed on the National Register of Historic Places in 1975.

The building originally had a square tower, which has been lost.
