= The Cedars (Leitchfield, Kentucky) =

- U.S. National Register of Historic Places
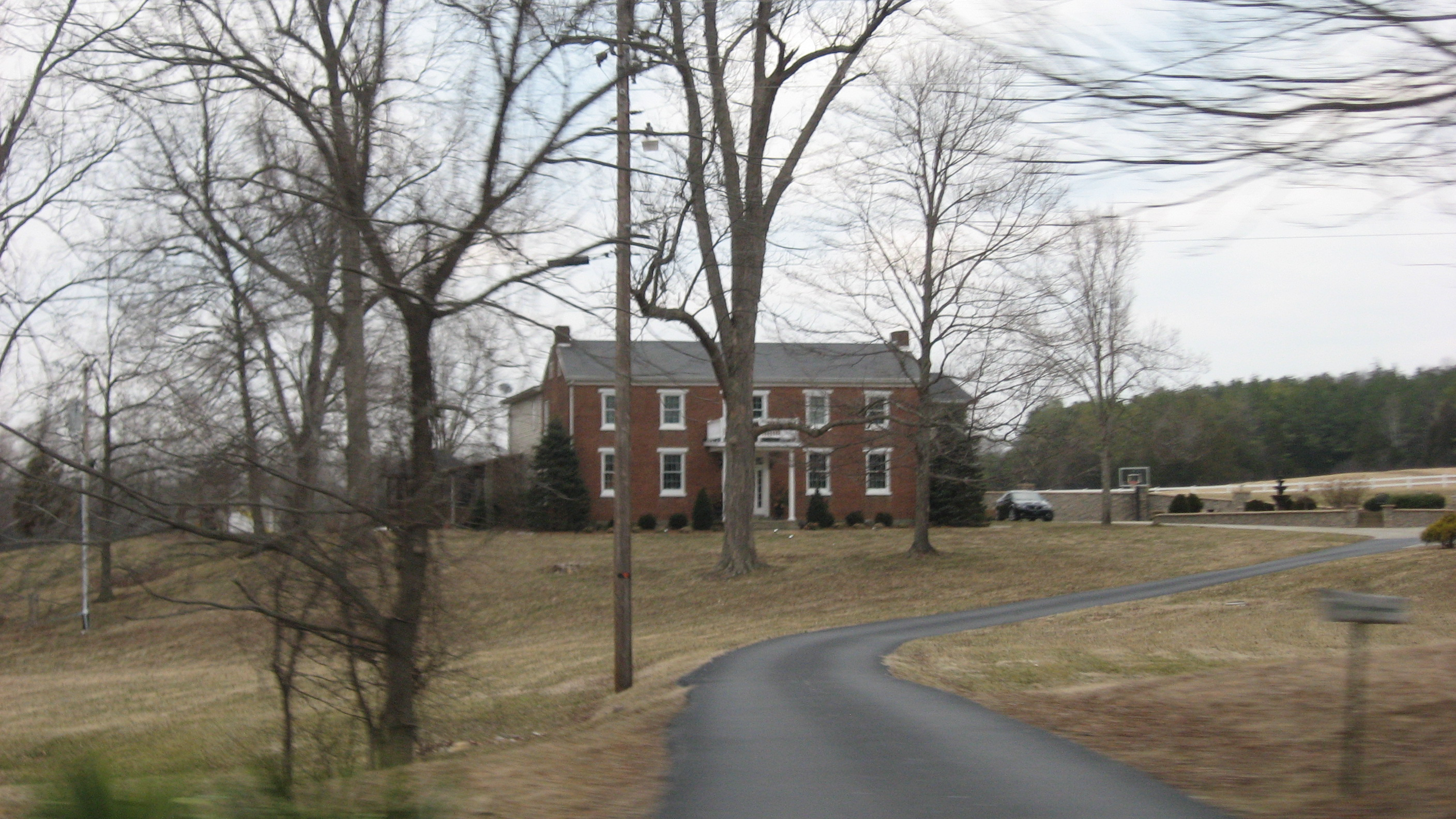

- Location within Kentucky Location within the United States
- Location: Grayson Springs Road, near Leitchfield, Kentucky
- Coordinates: 37°28′28″N 86°15′26″W
- Area: 5 acres (2.0 ha)
- Built: c.1789, 1847
- Built by: Benjamin Lone Rogers
- Architectural style: Greek Revival
- NRHP reference No.: 76000889
- Added to NRHP: May 17, 1976

The Cedars, on Grayson Springs Road in Grayson County, Kentucky east of Leitchfield, was built in c.1789 and 1847. It was listed on the National Register of Historic Places in 1976.

The main block of the brick house, Greek Revival in style, was built by Benjamin Lone Rogers in 1847.

It has also been known as the Benjamin Lone Rogers House.

== See also ==
- The Cedars (Franklin, Kentucky), in Simpson County, also NRHP-listed
