= Carolyn Denning =

American pediatrician (1927–2016)

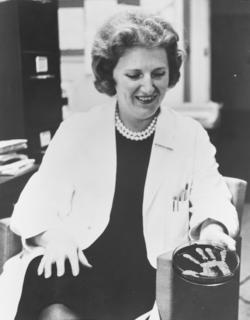
- Denning in 1967
- Born: May 30, 1927; Franklin, Kentucky
- Died: January 10, 2016 (aged 88); Englewood, New Jersey
- Other names: Dr Denning
- Occupation: Physician
- Known for: Advancements in treatment of cystic fibrosis

Carolyn Denning (May 30, 1927 – January 10, 2016) was an American pediatrician who specialized in the research and treatment of cystic fibrosis. When she began her 40-year career in the 1950s, those diagnosed with cystic fibrosis rarely reached puberty; today, nearly 50 percent of those diagnosed in the United States are aged 18 years or older.

== Early life and education ==
Denning was inspired to become a physician by her father, whose unfulfilled dream had been to become a doctor. Growing up, her female role models were mostly teachers, and although she assumed this would be her eventual career, with her father's support she decided to pursue medicine. She attended the University of Kentucky for undergraduate studies, and Tulane University for Medical School.

== Career ==
After graduating from Tulane University School of Medicine in 1952, Denning completed her residency in pediatrics and then a research fellowship in cystic fibrosis and celiac disease at Babies Hospital of the Columbia-Presbyterian Medical Center in New York City. While at Babies Hospital, Denning worked with Dr. Dorothy H. Andersen, the first physician to describe cystic fibrosis as a disease. After working at Babies Hospital for 20 years, Denning transferred to St. Vincent's in New York.

Throughout her career at both hospitals, Denning focused her efforts on researching all aspects of cystic fibrosis and treating the disease, including tooth discoloration, metabolism, pulmonary hypertension and the psychological and social aspects.

Denning served as director of the Cystic Fibrosis and Pediatric Pulmonary Disease Centers for both Babies Hospital and St. Vincent's Hospital and Medical Center. She was the first cystic fibrosis center director in the United States to use a multidisciplinary team approach to manage the disease.

Aside from research, Denning taught clinical pediatrics at several universities in New York, such as Columbia University, New York University School of Medicine and New York Medical College. She was the first woman to serve on Columbia's admissions committee as well as the first woman to chair the National Cystic Fibrosis Foundation's Medical Advisory Council, for which she served as president and on the board of trustees.

Denning was also a member of the Society for Pediatric Research, the American Academy of Pediatrics and the American Thoracic Society.

== Personal life ==
In 1956, Denning married Dr. Peter Scaglione, M.D. The couple had four children (in age order): Peter Jr, John, David, and Charles.

== Death ==
Denning died of a stroke in January 2016, aged 88 years. She was survived by her husband and four sons.
