= Blanche Taylor Dickinson =

American writer

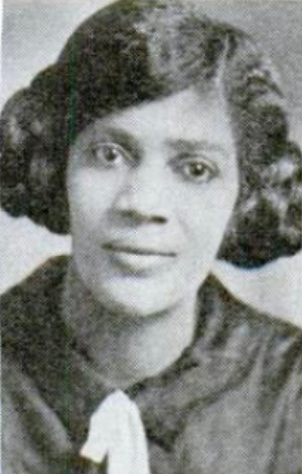
- Blanche Taylor Dickinson, from a 1927 publication
- Born: April 15, 1896 near Franklin, Kentucky
- Died: January 7, 1972 (aged 75); Hopkinsville, Kentucky
- Other names: Patty Blanche Taylor, Blanch T. Dickinson
- Occupations: Writer, poet, journalist

Blanche Taylor Dickinson (April 15, 1896 – January 7, 1972) was an American writer associated with the Harlem Renaissance arts movement. In 2023, she was inducted into the Kentucky Writers Hall of Fame.

== Early life and education ==
Blanche Taylor was born on a farm near Franklin, Kentucky, the daughter of Thomas Taylor and Laura Taylor. She attended Bowling Green Academy and Simmons College of Kentucky.

== Career ==
Taylor taught school as a young woman, and began a writing career, with works published in national periodicals such as The Crisis and Opportunity, and major Black newspapers including The Chicago Defender and Pittsburgh Courier. Editor Countee Cullen included her poetry in Caroling Dusk (1927). Charles S. Johnson also selected work by Taylor for his edited collection, Ebony and Topaz (1927). "I do write a salable story once in a while," she said in an interview with Opportunity magazine at the time, "and an acceptable poem a little oftener." Her journalism included newspaper columns "Smoky City's Streets" and "Valley Echoes" for the Pittsburgh Courier, and an interview about race and ability with Amelia Earhart for the Baltimore Afro-American in 1929.

== Publications ==
=== Poetry ===
- "The Rising Tide" (1925)
- "The Farm Routine" (1925)
- "Existence" (1926)
- "That Hill" (1927)
- "Fragile Things" (1927)
- "A Sonnet and a Rondeau" (1927)
- "The Walls of Jericho" (1927)
- "The Four Great Walls" (1927)
- "Revelation" (1927)
- "To an Icicle" (1927)
- "Poem" (1927)
- "Things Said When He Was Gone" (1927)
- "A dark actress, somewhere"
- "Mirrors" (1927)
- "Fortitude" (1927)
- "Garden of the Street" (1927)
- "To One Who Thinks of Suicide" (1928)
- "Fires" (1929)
- "Good Wife" (1929)

=== Fiction ===
- "Nellie Marie from Tennessee" (1927, serialized story)
- "Queenie" (1927)
- "Tools of Youth" (short story)
- "Lured by a Brown Siren" (1928, short story)
- "Nice Child" (1929, short story)

=== Journalism ===
- "Take a Walk in Toledo!" (1929, Pittsburgh Courier)
- "Suburban Realtor Dies" (1929, Pittsburgh Courier)
- "Amelia Earhart Discusses the Negro" (1929, Baltimore Afro American)

== Personal life and legacy ==
Taylor married Verdell Dickinson, a truck driver. They lived in Sewickley, Pennsylvania in the 1920s; they separated and she lived in Pittsburgh in the 1930s. She moved back to Kentucky by 1937, and resumed teaching in school. In later years she used the name "Patty Blanche Taylor". She died in 1972, at the age of 75. In recent years she has been included in anthologies of African American women's writing. In 2021, she was one of the historical figures featured in the DAR's "cemetery walk" in Franklin. In 2023, she was inducted into the Kentucky Writers Hall of Fame.
