= Jefferson County Courthouse Annex =

- U.S. National Register of Historic Places
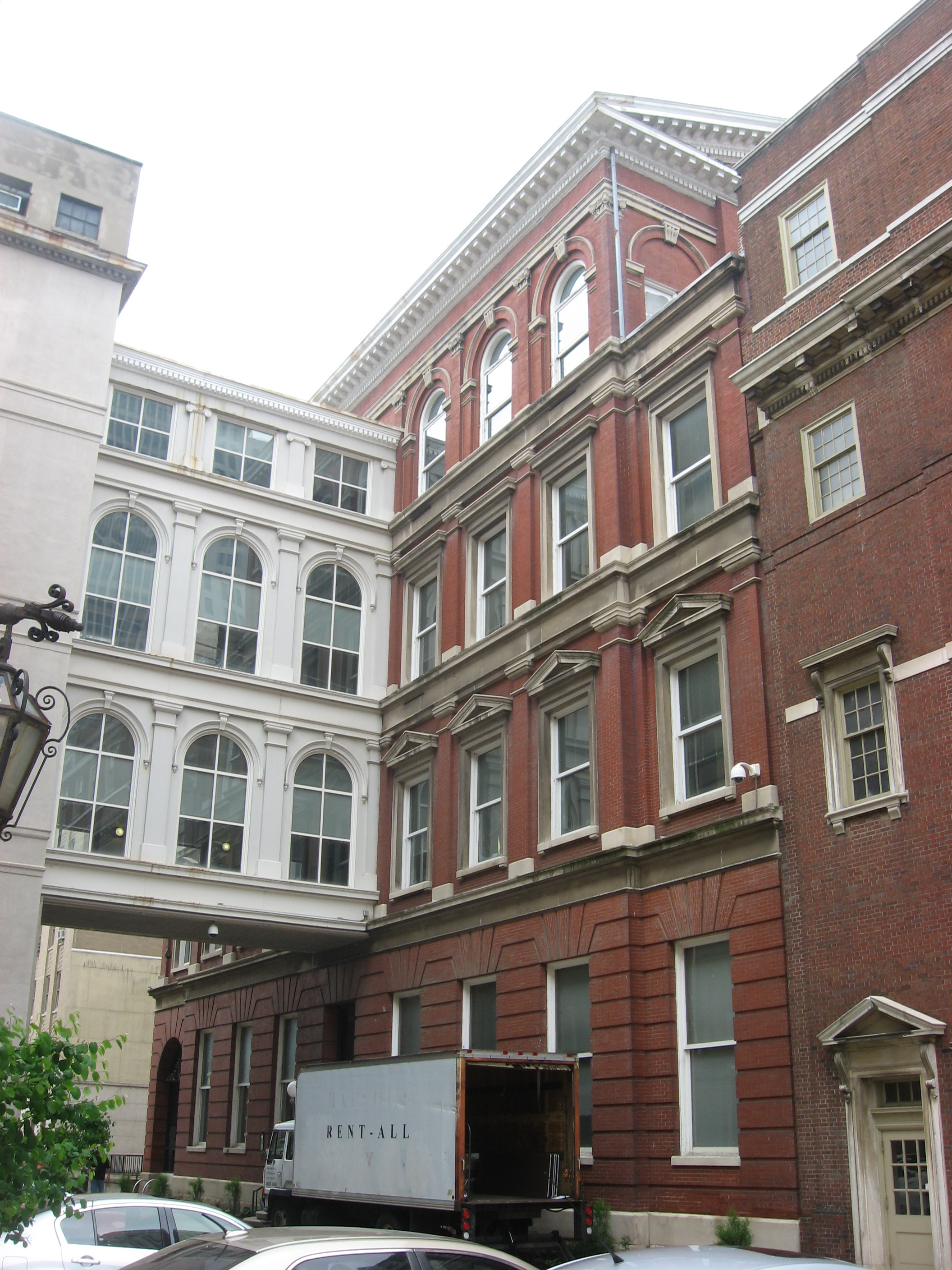
- View from the southeast

- Location within Kentucky Location within the United States
- Location: 517 Court Pl., Louisville, Kentucky
- Coordinates: 38°15′18″N 85°45′34″W
- Built: 1900
- Architect: Kenneth McDonald Sr.
- NRHP reference No.: 80001607
- Added to NRHP: April 21, 1980

The Jefferson County Courthouse Annex in Louisville, Kentucky was designed by Kenneth McDonald Sr. and built in 1900. It was listed on the National Register of Historic Places in 1980.

It is a four-story steel construction building with a brick veneer, joined to the Greek Revival Jefferson County Courthouse building by a bridge on the 2nd, 3rd, and 4th floors, over a narrow street.

It was designed by architect Kenneth McDonald Sr. It was described in its NRHP nomination as "stylistically a handsome complement" to the Jefferson County Courthouse.

The Jefferson County Courthouse was previously listed, in 1972.
