= First Cumberland Presbyterian Church-McKenzie =

Historic church in Tennessee, United States

- First Cumberland Presbyterian Church--McKenzie
- U.S. National Register of Historic Places
- Location within Tennessee Location within the United States
- Location: 647 Stonewall Street North (Note: The National Register of Historic Places (NRHP) application for the building lists the address as "305 North Stonewall Street", but apparently the addresses along the street have been renumbered. The address confusion is further complicated by several other churches in the area, including a "First Presbyterian Church" (which is located a few block south at 591 Stonewall Street North). Notwithstanding, a visual comparison of the existing buildings with the photographs that accompanied the NRHP application confirms that the subject of this article is the same as the building with the current address of 647 Stonewall Street North.); McKenzie, Tennessee; United States
- Coordinates: 36°8′0″N 88°31′13″W
- Area: 1.3 acres (0.53 ha)
- Built: 1888
- Architect: McDonald Bros.
- Architectural style: Gothic Revival
- NRHP reference No.: 93000476
- Added to NRHP: June 17, 1993

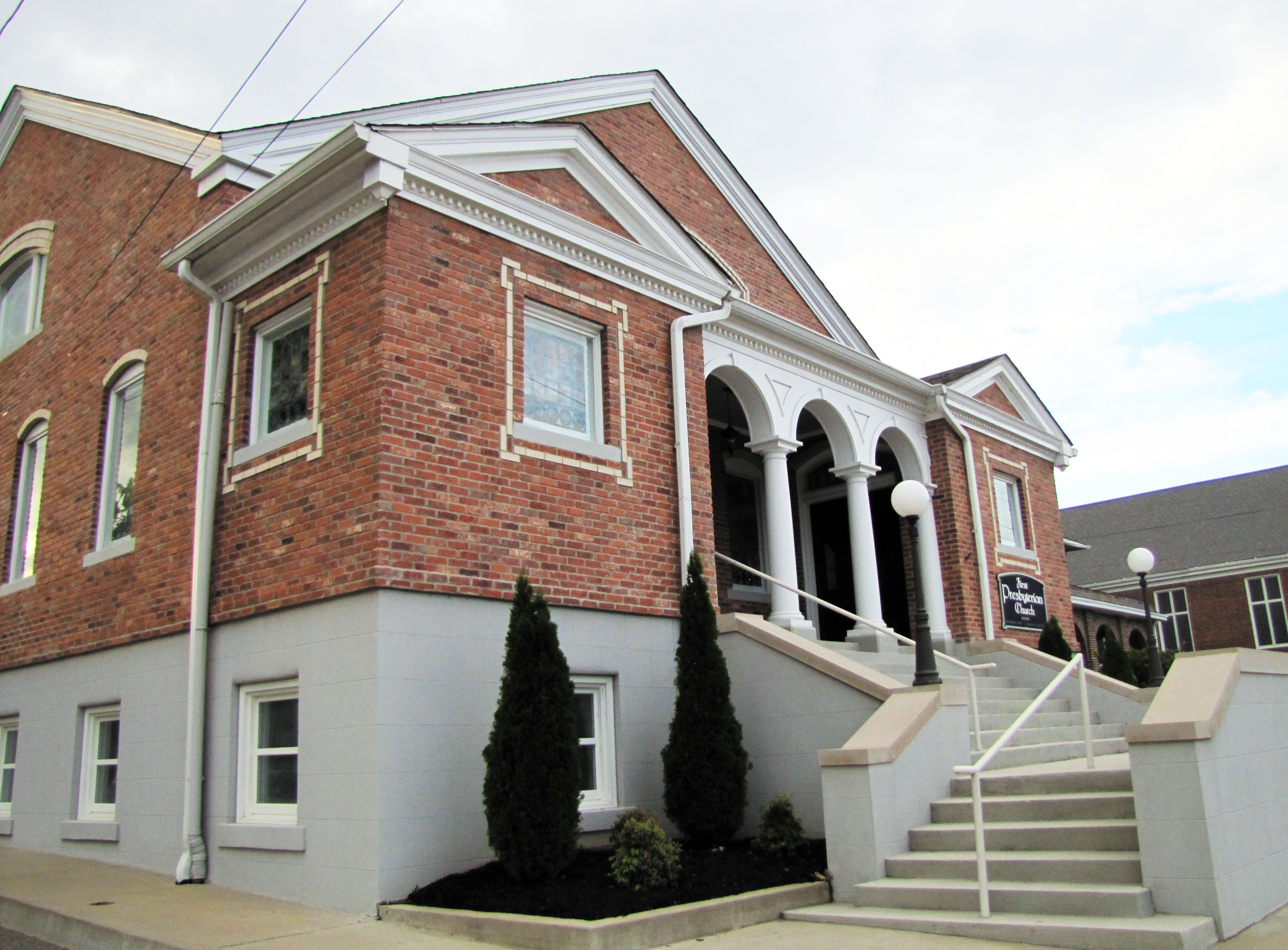
First Presbyterian Church, McKenzie, Tennessee 1.jpg

The First Cumberland Presbyterian Church is a historic Cumberland Presbyterian church building in McKenzie, Tennessee, United States, that was added to the National Register of Historic Places in 1993.

== Description ==
The church is located at 647 Stonewall Street North in central McKenzie, among several other church buildings, including a First Presbyterian Church, a First Baptist Church, and a First United Methodist Church .

== History ==
The congregation was organized in 1867 as the "Bethlehem Congregation of the Cumberland Presbyterian Church at McKenzie, Tennessee." It moved into its first permanent building in 1873. In 1889 the congregation adopted the name "McKenzie Cumberland Presbyterian Church". The 18,000-square-foot (1,700 m^{2}) Gothic building on Stonewall Street was built over the five-year period 1887 to 1892 at a cost of $8,000. It stood out in the community for its architecture, including a tall steeple over a high-vaulted slate roof, as well as its art glass windows.

In 1998 the congregation began a building project that culminated in 2002 with its relocation to a new 21,000-square-foot (2,000 m^{2}) church at 16835 Highland Drive. Some of the old church's furnishings were to be moved to the new building, and its stained glass windows were placed in storage in preparation for their installation in the new church, which was expected to be done in 2014.

The former church building is now utilized by the Nursing Program of Bethel University.

== See also ==
- National Register of Historic Places listings in Tennessee
