= Muhlenberg County Courthouse =

- U.S. National Register of Historic Places
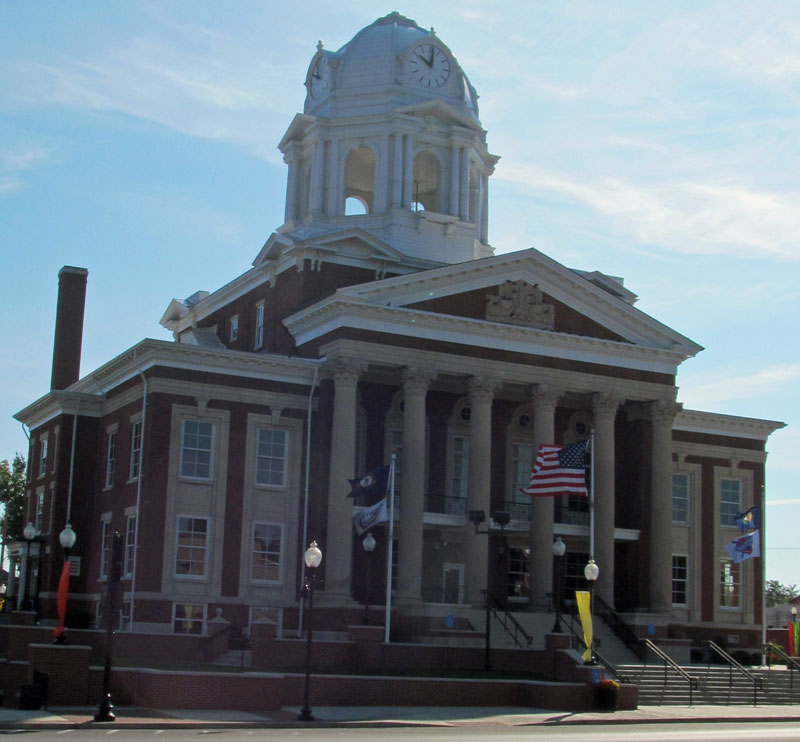

- Location within Kentucky Location within the United States
- Location: 100 S. Main St., Greenville, Kentucky
- Coordinates: 37°12′2″N 87°10′41″W
- Area: 0.4 acres (0.16 ha)
- Built: 1907
- Architect: McDonald, Kenneth, Sr.; Dodd, William
- NRHP reference No.: 78001390
- Added to NRHP: December 22, 1978

The Muhlenberg County Courthouse, located at 100 S. Main St. in Greenville, is the center of government of Muhlenberg County, Kentucky. Built in 1907, the courthouse was Muhlenberg County's third permanent courthouse since the county's creation in 1798. Louisville-based architects Kenneth McDonald Sr., and William J. Dodd – among the most prominent architects in the region at the turn of the 20th century – designed the courthouse. Their Beaux-Arts design features a recessed entrance pavilion set atop a flight of ten stairs and topped by a portico – which exhibits elements of the Neoclassical style – supported by columns. The building is topped by a Baroque octagonal cupola with a clock face on four sides. The interior floor plan is symmetrical.

The contract for the courthouse's construction was awarded to Bailey and Koerner, and the building was finished in 1907. It was added to the National Register of Historic Places on December 22, 1978. A historical marker outside the courthouse notes that in 1861, Confederate Lieutenant Colonel Nathan Bedford Forrest gathered his troops at the courthouse before the Battle of Sacramento. The courthouse now represents the first of ten stops on the Battle of Sacramento Civil War Driving Tour.
