= Sevier County Courthouse (Tennessee) =

- U.S. National Register of Historic Places
- U.S. Historic district – Contributing property
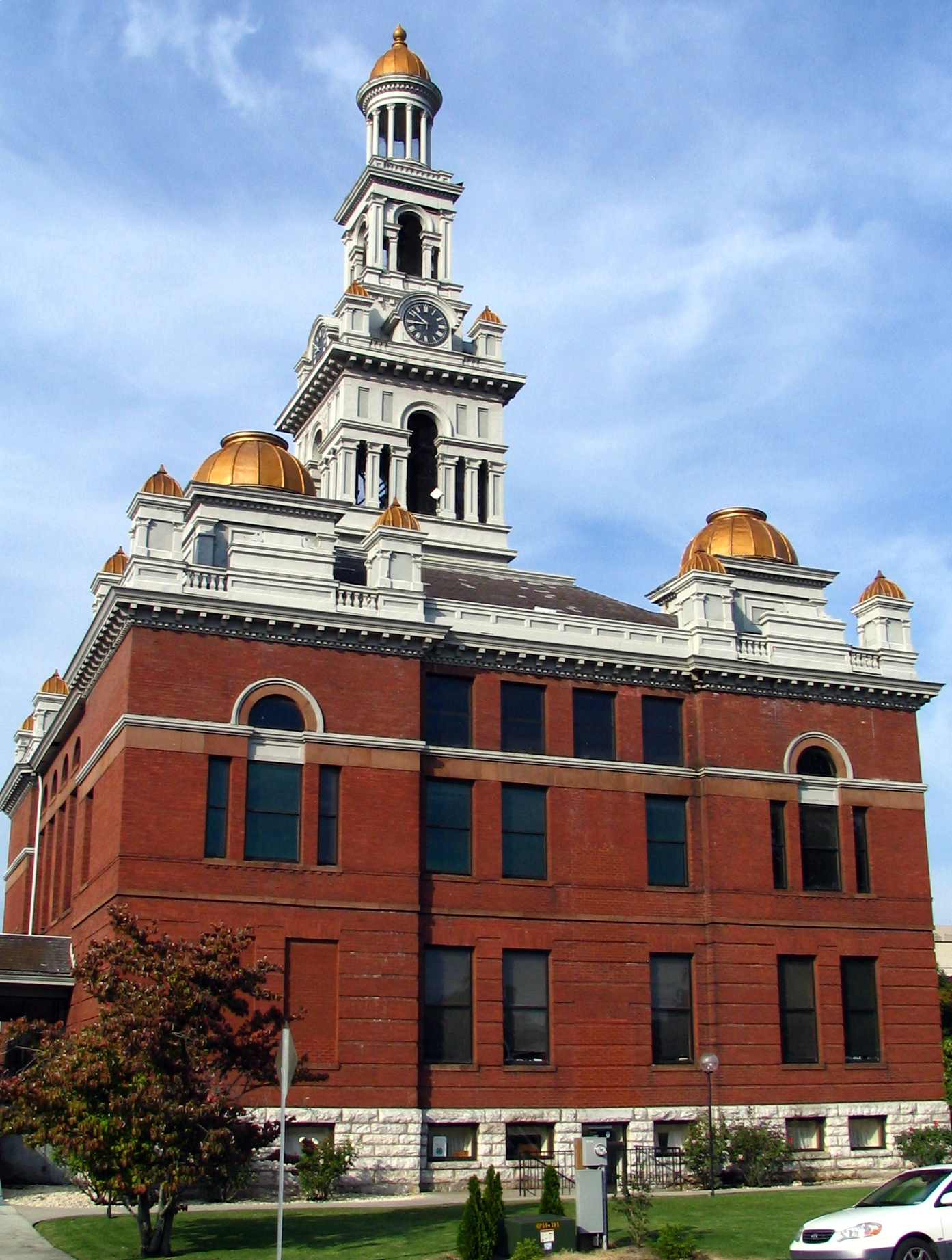
- Location: Court Ave., Sevierville, Tennessee
- Coordinates: 35°52′04″N 83°33′58″W
- Area: 9 acres (3.6 ha)
- Built: 1895
- Architect: McDonald Brothers of Louisville
- Architectural style: Beaux Arts, Romanesque
- Part of: Sevierville Commercial Historic District (ID86002910)
- NRHP reference No.: 71000832

Significant dates
- Added to NRHP: March 24, 1971
- Designated CP: October 23, 1986

The Sevier County Courthouse in Sevierville, Tennessee is a historic courthouse built in 1895. It was listed on the National Register of Historic Places in 1971.

It was designed in Beaux Arts style by the McDonald Brothers of Louisville. It is tall and visible from quite far away.

There is a statue of Dolly Parton designed by sculptor Jim Gray on the grounds of the courthouse.
