= Simpson County, Kentucky =

County in Kentucky, United States

- County
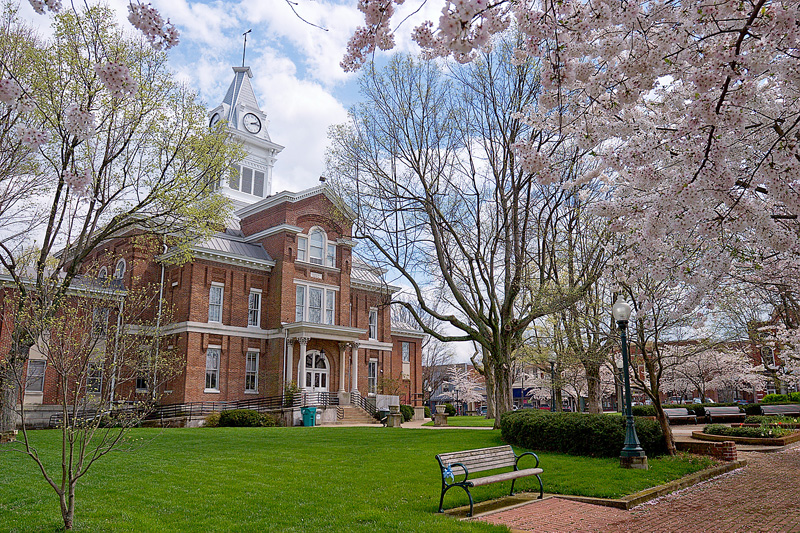
- Old Simpson County Courthouse in Franklin

- Location within the U.S. state of Kentucky
- Coordinates: 36°44′N 86°35′W
- Country: United States
- State: Kentucky
- Founded: 1819
- Named for: John Simpson
- Seat: Franklin
- Largest city: Franklin

Government
  - Judge/Executive: Mason Barnes (R)

Area
  - Total: 236 sq mi (610 km^{2})
  - Land: 234 sq mi (610 km^{2})
  - Water: 2.3 sq mi (6.0 km^{2}) 1.0%

Population (2020)
  - Total: 19,594
  - Estimate (2025): 20,788 ▲
  - Density: 83.7/sq mi (32.3/km^{2})
- Time zone: UTC−6 (Central)
  - Summer (DST): UTC−5 (CDT)
- Congressional district: 1st
- Website: simpsoncountyky.gov

Simpson County is a county located in the south central portion of the U.S. state of Kentucky. As of the 2020 census, the total population was 19,594. Its county seat is Franklin.

== History ==
Simpson County was established in 1819 from Allen, Logan, and Warren Counties. The county is named for Captain John Simpson, a Kentucky militia officer who fought in Battle of Fallen Timbers in the Northwest Indian War, and was killed during the War of 1812 in the Battle of River Raisin.

== Geography ==
According to the United States Census Bureau, the county has a total area of 236 square miles (610 km^{2}), of which 234 square miles (610 km^{2}) is land and 2.3 square miles (6.0 km^{2}) (1.0%) is water. The county is located in the Pennyroyal Plateau region of the state.

=== Adjacent counties ===
- Warren County (north)
- Allen County (east)
- Sumner County, Tennessee (southeast)
- Robertson County, Tennessee (southwest)
- Logan County (west)

== Demographics ==
Historical population
Census	Pop.	Note	%±
1820	4,852		—
1830	5,815		19.8%
1840	6,537		12.4%
1850	7,733		18.3%
1860	8,146		5.3%
1870	9,573		17.5%
1880	10,641		11.2%
1890	10,878		2.2%
1900	11,624		6.9%
1910	11,460		−1.4%
1920	11,150		−2.7%
1930	11,336		1.7%
1940	11,752		3.7%
1950	11,678		−0.6%
1960	11,548		−1.1%
1970	13,054		13.0%
1980	14,673		12.4%
1990	15,145		3.2%
2000	16,405		8.3%
2010	17,327		5.6%
2020	19,594		13.1%
2025 (est.)	20,788	▲	6.1%
U.S. Decennial Census; 1790-1960 1900-1990; 1990-2000 2010-2020

=== 2020 census ===
As of the 2020 census, the county had a population of 19,594. The median age was 39.7 years. 23.4% of residents were under the age of 18 and 17.1% of residents were 65 years of age or older. For every 100 females there were 96.3 males, and for every 100 females age 18 and over there were 94.3 males age 18 and over.

The racial makeup of the county was 83.6% White, 8.4% Black or African American, 0.4% American Indian and Alaska Native, 0.5% Asian, 0.0% Native Hawaiian and Pacific Islander, 1.5% from some other race, and 5.6% from two or more races. Hispanic or Latino residents of any race comprised 3.3% of the population.

59.4% of residents lived in urban areas, while 40.6% lived in rural areas.

There were 7,600 households in the county, of which 31.1% had children under the age of 18 living with them and 26.7% had a female householder with no spouse or partner present. About 26.9% of all households were made up of individuals and 11.5% had someone living alone who was 65 years of age or older.

There were 8,263 housing units, of which 8.0% were vacant. Among occupied housing units, 64.5% were owner-occupied and 35.5% were renter-occupied. The homeowner vacancy rate was 1.0% and the rental vacancy rate was 7.4%.

=== 2000 census ===
As of the census of 2000, there were 16,405 people, 6,415 households, and 4,638 families residing in the county. The population density was 70 per square mile (27/km^{2}). There were 7,016 housing units at an average density of 30 per square mile (12/km^{2}). The racial makeup of the county was 87.84% White, 10.22% Black or African American, 0.17% Native American, 0.55% Asian, 0.06% Pacific Islander, 0.30% from other races, and 0.87% from two or more races. 0.91% of the population were Hispanics or Latinos of any race.

There were 6,415 households, out of which 33.80% had children under the age of 18 living with them, 56.80% were married couples living together, 11.50% had a female householder with no husband present, and 27.70% were non-families. 24.20% of all households were made up of individuals, and 10.40% had someone living alone who was 65 years of age or older. The average household size was 2.52 and the average family size was 2.97.

The age distribution was 26.20% under the age of 18, 8.50% from 18 to 24, 29.20% from 25 to 44, 23.00% from 45 to 64, and 13.10% who were 65 years of age or older. The median age was 36 years. For every 100 females there were 95.30 males. For every 100 females age 18 and over, there were 91.60 males.

The median income for a household in the county was $36,432, and the median income for a family was $42,525. Males had a median income of $32,160 versus $22,667 for females. The per capita income for the county was $17,150. About 8.50% of families and 11.60% of the population were below the poverty line, including 14.00% of those under age 18 and 15.90% of those age 65 or over.

== Economy ==
In December 2025, Kroger, the largest traditional grocer in the country, announced plans to establish a new $391 million high-tech automated distribution center in Franklin, Simpson County, a project that will create approximately 430 new full-time jobs.

== Communities ==
=== City ===
- Franklin (county seat)

=== Unincorporated communities ===
- Gold City
- Middleton
- Neosheo
- Prices Mill
- Providence
- Salmons

== Politics ==
United States presidential election results for Simpson County, Kentucky
Year	Republican		Democratic		Third party(ies)	
Year	No.	%	No.	%	No.	%
1912	547	20.96%	1,639	62.80%	424	16.25%
1916	955	33.41%	1,887	66.03%	16	0.56%
1920	1,680	34.24%	3,206	65.34%	21	0.43%
1924	1,294	32.08%	2,688	66.63%	52	1.29%
1928	1,635	39.64%	2,490	60.36%	0	0.00%
1932	1,203	24.92%	3,603	74.64%	21	0.44%
1936	1,240	28.97%	3,027	70.72%	13	0.30%
1940	987	25.02%	2,950	74.78%	8	0.20%
1944	1,012	26.29%	2,821	73.27%	17	0.44%
1948	762	20.46%	2,752	73.90%	210	5.64%
1952	1,310	32.43%	2,724	67.43%	6	0.15%
1956	1,454	33.43%	2,879	66.18%	17	0.39%
1960	1,927	42.18%	2,642	57.82%	0	0.00%
1964	967	23.33%	3,168	76.45%	9	0.22%
1968	1,435	33.07%	1,505	34.69%	1,399	32.24%
1972	2,285	62.57%	1,325	36.28%	42	1.15%
1976	1,481	34.45%	2,782	64.71%	36	0.84%
1980	2,020	41.92%	2,713	56.30%	86	1.78%
1984	3,073	58.69%	2,140	40.87%	23	0.44%
1988	2,699	55.55%	2,138	44.00%	22	0.45%
1992	2,280	39.04%	2,834	48.53%	726	12.43%
1996	2,186	40.80%	2,749	51.31%	423	7.89%
2000	3,169	54.41%	2,583	44.35%	72	1.24%
2004	4,273	60.67%	2,730	38.76%	40	0.57%
2008	4,437	60.71%	2,775	37.97%	97	1.33%
2012	4,355	61.40%	2,650	37.36%	88	1.24%
2016	5,077	67.41%	2,144	28.47%	310	4.12%
2020	5,888	67.43%	2,681	30.70%	163	1.87%
2024	6,253	71.25%	2,403	27.38%	120	1.37%

In contrast to the Western Coalfield and the eastern part of the Pennyroyal Plateau, Simpson County was not highly pro-Union during the Civil War. Consequently, Simpson was as reliably Democratic as the Jackson Purchase and Bluegrass during the following century: no Republican carried Simpson County until Richard Nixon’s 1972 landslide.

=== Elected officials ===
Elected officials as of January 3, 2025
U.S. House	James Comer (R)	KY 1
Ky. Senate	Mike Wilson (R)	32
Ky. House	Shawn McPherson (R)	22

== See also ==
- National Register of Historic Places listings in Simpson County, Kentucky

== Sources ==
- Simpson County, Kentucky, KyGenWeb.
- Simpson County, Kentucky, Kentucky Atlas & Gazetteer.
