= Franklin Downtown Commercial District =

Historic district in Kentucky, United States

- U.S. National Register of Historic Places
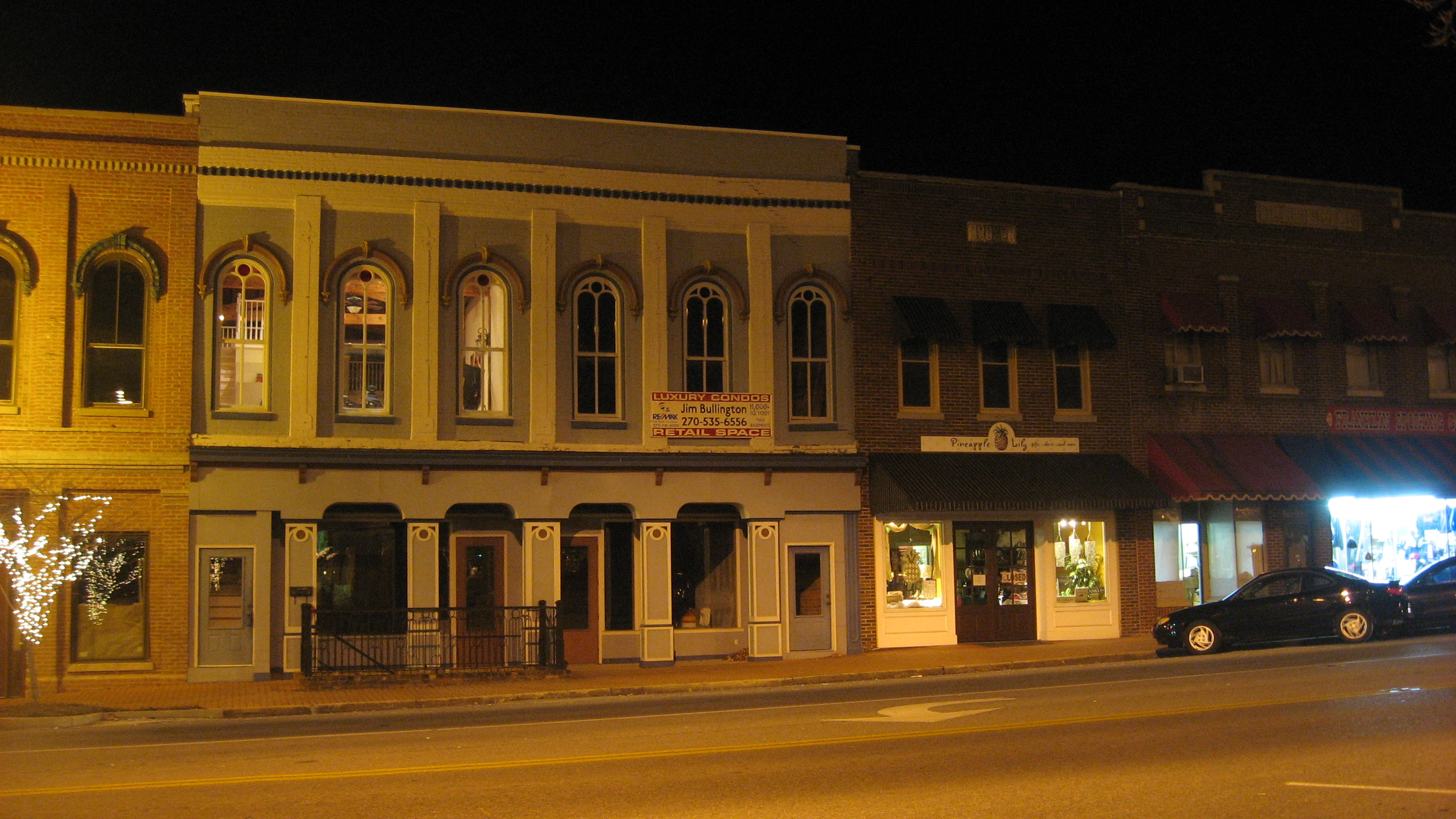

- Location within Kentucky Location within the United States
- Location: Roughly Main and College Sts. between Washington and Madison Sts. (original); also 200 S. Main and 207 S. College Sts. (increase) Franklin, Kentucky
- Coordinates: 36°43′22″N 86°34′43″W
- Area: 15 acres (6.1 ha) (original); 1 acre (0.40 ha) (increase)
- Built: 1822
- Architectural style: Mixed (more Than 2 Styles From Different Periods)
- NRHP reference No.: 83002873 (original); 83002874 (increase)

Significant dates
- Added to NRHP: February 17, 1983
- Boundary increase: August 18, 1983

The Franklin Downtown Commercial District, in Franklin, Kentucky, is a historic district which was listed on the National Register of Historic Places in 1983. The listing was expanded later in the same year.

The original listing included 50 contributing buildings, including the Simpson County Courthouse which was already separately listed on the National Register.

The increase added four contributing buildings:

- the Dr. J.C. Douglas House (c.1850-1875), an Italianate I-house built with common bond brick
- the Southern Kentucky Sanatorium (c.1900) and Annex (1912), post-Victorian structures, and
- the Grainger Apartments (1927), a Georgian Revival structure.
