= Simpson County Courthouse (Kentucky) =

- U.S. National Register of Historic Places
- U.S. Historic district – Contributing property
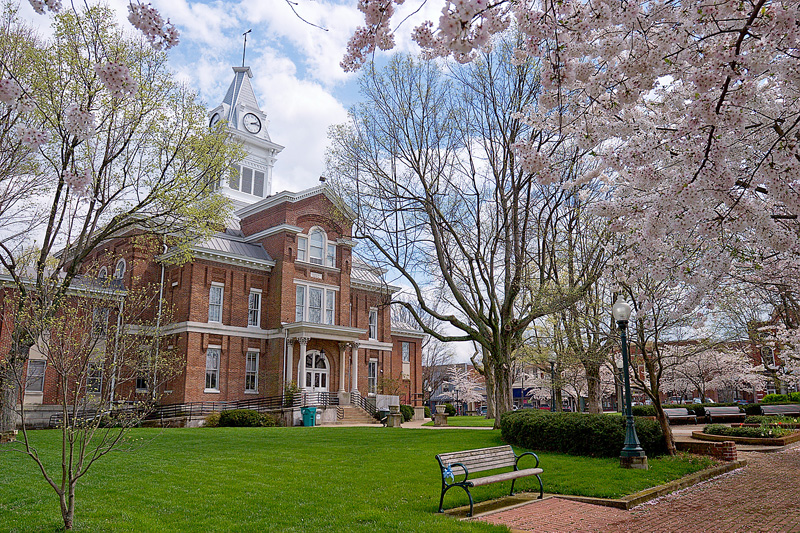
- Location: KY 73, Franklin, Kentucky
- Coordinates: 36°43′21″N 86°34′42″W
- Area: 2.9 acres (1.2 ha)
- Built: 1882-83
- Architect: McDonald Brothers
- Architectural style: Late Victorian
- Part of: Franklin Downtown Commercial District (ID83002873)
- NRHP reference No.: 80001668

Significant dates
- Added to NRHP: March 18, 1980
- Designated CP: June 7, 1978

The Simpson County Courthouse, also known as the Old Simpson County Courthouse, is a building in Franklin, Kentucky located on US 31W and Kentucky Route 73. The courthouse was built in 1882 and was used as a courthouse until the completion of the new Franklin Justice Center in 2004. The original courthouse was destroyed by a fire on May 17, 1882, and many documents were lost in the flames. The current courthouse was built between 1882 and 1883. Wings were added to the courthouse in 1962 that attempted to match the style.

It was designed by Louisville architects the McDonald Brothers.

The courthouse was also included as a contributing building in the 1983 NRHP listing of the Franklin Downtown Commercial District.
