= Franklin, Kentucky =

- City
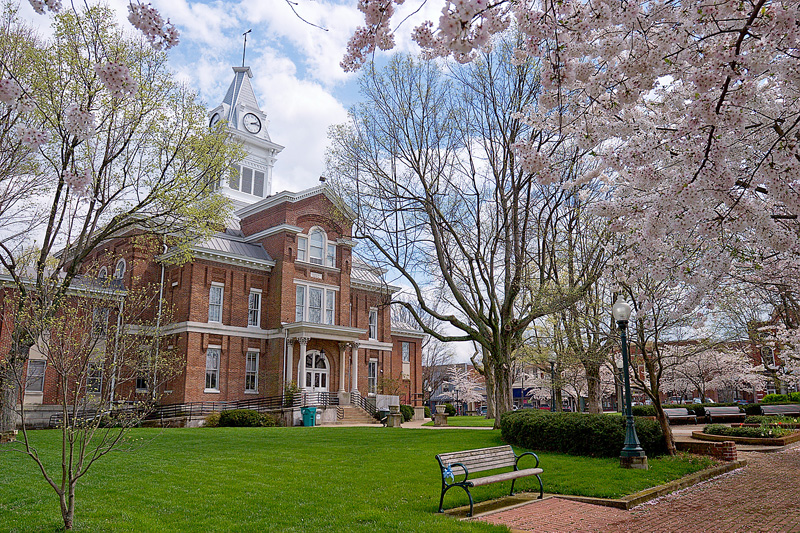
- Simpson County Courthouse in Franklin (2007)

- Location of Franklin in Simpson County, Kentucky.
- Coordinates: 36°43′21″N 86°34′39″W
- Country: United States
- State: Kentucky
- County: Simpson
- Established: November 2, 1820

Government
  - Type: City Commission

Area
  - Total: 14.86 sq mi (38.48 km^{2})
  - Land: 14.75 sq mi (38.19 km^{2})
  - Water: 0.11 sq mi (0.29 km^{2})
- Elevation: 709 ft (216 m)

Population (2020)
  - Total: 10,176
  - Estimate (2022): 10,344
  - Density: 690.1/sq mi (266.43/km^{2})
- Time zone: UTC-6 (Central (CST))
  - Summer (DST): UTC-5 (CDT)
- ZIP codes: 42134-42135
- Area codes: 270 & 364
- FIPS code: 21-28918
- GNIS feature ID: 0492443
- Website: www.franklinky.gov

Franklin is a home rule-class city in and the county seat of Simpson County, Kentucky, United States. The county is located on the south central border of the state, and its population was 10,176 at the 2020 census.

Kentucky Downs, formerly known as Dueling Grounds Racetrack (owned by Corey Johnsen & Ray Reid), is located in Franklin on the Kentucky–Tennessee border. Kentucky Downs hosts the Kentucky Cup Turf Festival, a full card of world-class horse racing featuring four major turf stakes. Kentucky Downs also hosts year-round simulcasts for the Kentucky-Tennessee market.

== History ==
Franklin was formally incorporated by the state assembly on November 2, 1820, on a 62-acre (250,000 m^{2}) tract of land. This tract was purchased from William Hudspeth and was named for Founding Father Benjamin Franklin. The post office was established on September 29, 1822, with Robert W. Simpson as postmaster. On January 7, 1948, Captain Thomas Mantell of the Kentucky Air National Guard died in a plane crash near Franklin, Kentucky, while pursuing an unidentified flying object. The incident, which involved multiple eyewitness reports across Kentucky, Ohio, and Tennessee, became one of the earliest and most widely publicized UFO-related fatalities in U.S. history. A historical marker commemorating the event is located at the Simpson County Tourism office.

On March 1, 1968, Johnny Cash and June Carter Cash were married at the Franklin First United Methodist church by Reverend Leslie Chapman.

== Economy ==
In December 2025, Kroger, the largest traditional grocer in the country, announced plans to establish a new $391 million high-tech automated distribution center in Franklin, a project that will create approximately 430 new full-time jobs.

== Climate ==
The climate in this area is characterized by hot, humid summers and generally mild to cool winters. According to the Köppen Climate Classification system, Franklin has a humid subtropical climate, abbreviated "Cfa" on climate maps.

Climate data for Franklin, KY (1991-2020, coordinates:36.6878°N 86.5061°W)
Month	Jan	Feb	Mar	Apr	May	Jun	Jul	Aug	Sep	Oct	Nov	Dec	Year
Average precipitation inches (mm)	3.79 (96)	3.96 (101)	4.72 (120)	4.86 (123)	5.38 (137)	4.43 (113)	4.25 (108)	3.48 (88)	3.31 (84)	3.70 (94)	3.83 (97)	4.83 (123)	50.54 (1,284)
Average snowfall inches (cm)	1.5 (3.8)	1.3 (3.3)	0.6 (1.5)	0.0 (0.0)	0.0 (0.0)	0.0 (0.0)	0.0 (0.0)	0.0 (0.0)	0.0 (0.0)	0.0 (0.0)	0.0 (0.0)	0.9 (2.3)	4.3 (10.9)
Average precipitation days (≥ 0.01 in)	7.4	7.3	8.3	7.1	8.4	6.6	6.7	4.8	5.1	4.6	6.7	7.8	80.8
Average snowy days (≥ 0.01 in)	0.7	1.1	0.3	0	0	0	0	0	0	0	0	0.6	2.7

== Geography ==
Franklin is located at 36°43′21″N 86°34′39″W (36.722487, -86.577566).

According to the United States Census Bureau, the city has a total area of 7.4 square miles (19 km^{2}), all land.

== Demographics ==
Historical population
Census	Pop.	Note	%±
1830	280		—
1860	828		—
1870	1,808		118.4%
1880	1,686		−6.7%
1890	2,324		37.8%
1900	2,166		−6.8%
1910	3,063		41.4%
1920	3,154		3.0%
1930	3,056		−3.1%
1940	3,940		28.9%
1950	4,343		10.2%
1960	5,329		22.7%
1970	6,553		23.0%
1980	7,738		18.1%
1990	7,607		−1.7%
2000	7,996		5.1%
2010	8,408		5.2%
2020	10,176		21.0%
2024 (est.)	10,524		3.4%
U.S. Decennial Census

=== 2020 census ===
As of the 2020 census, Franklin had a population of 10,176. The population density was 690 inhabitants per square mile (270/km^{2}). The median age was 37.5 years. 23.5% of residents were under the age of 18 and 16.3% of residents were 65 years of age or older. For every 100 females there were 93.7 males, and for every 100 females age 18 and over there were 90.6 males age 18 and over.

94.9% of residents lived in urban areas, while 5.1% lived in rural areas.

There were 3,951 households in Franklin, of which 31.2% had children under the age of 18 living in them. Of all households, 40.0% were married-couple households, 17.7% were households with a male householder and no spouse or partner present, and 33.8% were households with a female householder and no spouse or partner present. About 31.0% of all households were made up of individuals and 13.1% had someone living alone who was 65 years of age or older.

There were 4,353 housing units, of which 9.2% were vacant. The homeowner vacancy rate was 1.7% and the rental vacancy rate was 7.3%.

Racial composition as of the 2020 census
Race	Number	Percent
White	7,910	77.7%
Black or African American	1,305	12.8%
American Indian and Alaska Native	50	0.5%
Asian	68	0.7%
Native Hawaiian and Other Pacific Islander	3	0.0%
Some other race	174	1.7%
Two or more races	666	6.5%
Hispanic or Latino (of any race)	390	3.8%

== Education ==
Public education in Franklin is administered by Simpson County School District, which operates Franklin Elementary School, Lincoln Elementary School and Simpson Elementary School, Franklin-Simpson Middle School and Franklin-Simpson High School as well as an alternative school called Franklin-Simpson High School West Campus.

Franklin Mennonite Elementary School and Faith Baptist Academy are private institutions.

Franklin has a public library, the Goodnight Memorial Library.

== Notable people ==
- Joe Blanton (1980–), Major League Baseball pitcher, was raised in Franklin
- Marty Brown (1965–), country singer-songwriter born in Maceo and moved to Franklin in 2004
- Thomas Chisholm (1866–1960), Christian songwriter who wrote "Great is Thy Faithfulness", was born in Franklin
- Carolyn Denning (1927–2016), pediatrician and pioneer in cystic fibrosis treatment, grew up in Franklin
- Blanche Taylor Dickinson (1896–1972), poet
- James Earnest (1818–1900), member of the Wisconsin State Assembly and Wisconsin State Senate, was born in Franklin
- Brad M. Kelley (1956–), billionaire businessman, came from Franklin
- Carolyn Conn Moore (1904–1986) of Franklin was elected as the first woman to serve in the Kentucky Senate in November 1949, after a special election to replace her husband, the late J. Lee Moore, after his death.
- Kenny Perry (1960–), a retired PGA golfer with 14 wins on the PGA Tour, 10 wins on the Senior PGA Tour, including 4 senior majors, and was a member of the U.S. teams in 5 Ryder & President's Cups, spent most of his childhood in Franklin and continues to live there. Today he operates a golf course there, Kenny Perry's Country Creek course.
- Joker Phillips (1963–), pro football player, was born and raised in Franklin; he attended, played football, and is a former head coach at the University of Kentucky.
- Annie Potts (1952–), actress (Ghostbusters, Pretty in Pink, Designing Women, and Young Sheldon), was raised in Franklin and graduated from Franklin-Simpson High School in 1971.
- Tony Randolph (1966–), member of the South Dakota House of Representatives

== See also ==
- List of cities in Kentucky
- Mantell UFO Incident- Franklin has a roadside historical marker for this incident.
