= National Register of Historic Places listings in Downtown Louisville, Kentucky =

This is a list of properties and historic districts on the National Register of Historic Places in downtown Louisville, Kentucky. Latitude and longitude coordinates of the 93 sites listed on this page may be displayed in a map or exported in several formats by clicking on one of the links in the adjacent box.

National Register sites elsewhere in Jefferson County are listed separately.

This National Park Service list is complete through NPS recent listings posted October 16, 2026.

== Current listings ==
	Name on the Register	Image	Date listed	Location	Description
1	Adath Jeshurun Temple and School	Adath Jeshurun Temple and School	January 28, 1982 (#82002703)	757 S. Brook St. 38°14′35″N 85°45′07″W	
2	Almsted Brothers Building	Almsted Brothers Building	March 1, 1982 (#82002704)	425 W. Market St. 38°15′20″N 85°45′29″W	
3	American Life & Accident Insurance Co. Building	American Life & Accident Insurance Co. Building	April 17, 2025 (#16000006)	471 W. Main St. (3 Riverfront Plaza); 38°15′25″N 85°45′28″W	
4	Ancient and Accepted Scottish Rite Temple	Ancient and Accepted Scottish Rite Temple	April 29, 1982 (#82002705)	200 E. Gray St. 38°14′48″N 85°45′04″W	
5	Armour & Co. Branch House		January 8, 2025 (#100011308)	201 E. Main St. 38°15′21″N 85°44′58″W	
6	Belle of Louisville (steamer)	Belle of Louisville (steamer)	April 10, 1972 (#72000535)	401 W. River Rd. 38°15′34″N 85°45′20″W	
7	The Bensinger Building		April 3, 2026 (#100012874)	313-315 West Market Street; 38°15′19″N 85°45′21″W	
8	Bosler Fireproof Garage	Bosler Fireproof Garage	August 18, 1983 (#83002639)	423 S. 3rd St. 38°15′08″N 85°45′19″W	Later called the Morrissey Garage, the city of Louisville began demolition of the building April 11–12, 2015
9	Brandeis House	Brandeis House	March 1, 1984 (#84001553)	310 E. Broadway; 38°14′42″N 85°44′57″W	
10	Breslin Building	Breslin Building	June 20, 2013 (#83004589)	305 W. Broadway; 38°14′47″N 85°45′25″W	Originally nominated in 1983, but was initially denied due to owner objection. Objections were lifted in 2013.
11	Brown Hotel Building and Theater	Brown Hotel Building and Theater	February 17, 1978 (#78001346)	335 W. Broadway; 38°14′47″N 85°45′29″W	
12	J.T.S. Brown and Son's Complex	J.T.S. Brown and Son's Complex	December 10, 1998 (#98001489)	105, 107-109 W. Main St. 38°15′23″N 85°45′07″W	
13	The Business Women's Club	The Business Women's Club	February 7, 2008 (#08000006)	425 Muhammad Ali Boulevard; 38°15′05″N 85°45′31″W	
14	Caperton Block	Caperton Block	July 12, 1984 (#84001554)	564-574 4th St. 38°14′57″N 85°45′29″W	
15	Cathedral of the Assumption	Cathedral of the Assumption	September 21, 1977 (#77000623)	443 S. 5th St. 38°15′07″N 85°45′31″W	
16	Chestnut Street Methodist Church	Chestnut Street Methodist Church	July 16, 1979 (#79001000)	809 W. Chestnut St. 38°15′00″N 85°45′55″W	
17	Christ Church Cathedral	Christ Church Cathedral	August 14, 1973 (#73000807)	421 S. 2nd St. 38°15′07″N 85°45′13″W	
18	The Cumberland	The Cumberland	March 14, 1996 (#96000278)	201 York St. 38°14′38″N 85°45′20″W	
19	J. Dolfinger and Company Building	J. Dolfinger and Company Building	December 21, 1990 (#90001836)	642 S. 4th St. 38°14′50″N 85°45′30″W	
20	Electric Building	Electric Building	March 14, 1985 (#85000558)	619 S. 4th St. 38°14′54″N 85°45′28″W	
21	Elks Athletic Club	Elks Athletic Club	July 16, 1979 (#79001003)	604 S. 3rd St. 38°14′55″N 85°45′23″W	
22	Fifth and Market Streets Historic District		June 12, 2025 (#90001487)	201-235 S. Fifth Street (east side only) and 426-440 W. Market; 38°15′19″N 85°45′30″W	
23	Fifth Ward School	Fifth Ward School	March 31, 1978 (#78001353)	743 S. 5th St. 38°14′40″N 85°45′36″W	
24	First Lutheran Church	First Lutheran Church	October 29, 1982 (#82001558)	417 E. Broadway; 38°14′44″N 85°44′48″W	
25	First National Bank-Kentucky Title Company Building	First National Bank-Kentucky Title Company Building	May 19, 1983 (#83002664)	214 S. 5th St. 38°15′18″N 85°45′32″W	
26	German Bank Building	German Bank Building	October 11, 1984 (#84000029)	150 S. 5th St. 38°15′20″N 85°45′31″W	
27	German Insurance Bank	German Insurance Bank	March 14, 1985 (#85000559)	207 W. Market St. 38°15′19″N 85°45′14″W	
28	Hamilton Brothers Warehouse	Hamilton Brothers Warehouse	February 7, 2008 (#08000007)	125-127 W. Main St. 38°15′23″N 85°45′09″W	
29	Haury Motor Company Showroom and Garage		March 13, 2017 (#100000739)	741 S. 3rd St. 38°14′40″N 85°45′25″W	
30	Heyburn Building	Heyburn Building	July 16, 1979 (#79001007)	332 W. Broadway; 38°14′45″N 85°45′29″W	
31	House of Weller	House of Weller	September 26, 1979 (#79001008)	121 W. Main St. 38°15′23″N 85°45′09″W	
32	Howard-Hardy House	Howard-Hardy House	November 9, 2004 (#03000709)	429 S. 2nd St. 38°15′06″N 85°45′14″W	
33	E.L. Hughes Company Building		August 4, 2016 (#16000498)	209 E. Main St. 38°15′21″N 85°44′58″W	
34	Inter-Southern Insurance Building	Inter-Southern Insurance Building	March 19, 1980 (#80001605)	239-247 S. 5th St. 38°15′15″N 85°45′30″W	
35	Jefferson County Armory	Jefferson County Armory	March 24, 1980 (#80001606)	525 W. Muhammad Ali Boulevard; 38°15′06″N 85°45′37″W	
36	Jefferson County Courthouse	Jefferson County Courthouse	April 10, 1972 (#72000537)	527 W. Jefferson St. 38°15′16″N 85°45′34″W	Now the Louisville Metro Hall, seat of government for all of Louisville and Jefferson County, Kentucky.
37	Jefferson County Courthouse Annex	Jefferson County Courthouse Annex	April 21, 1980 (#80001607)	517 Court Pl. 38°15′18″N 85°45′34″W	
38	Jefferson County Fiscal Court Building		April 16, 2024 (#100010228)	531 Court Place; 38°15′18″N 85°45′36″W	
39	Jefferson County Jail	Jefferson County Jail	July 16, 1973 (#73000808)	514 W. Liberty St. 38°15′11″N 85°45′36″W	
40	Paul Jones Building		April 3, 2026 (#100012872)	312 S. 4th St. 38°15′13″N 85°45′26″W	
41	Kaufman-Straus Building	Kaufman-Straus Building	February 14, 1978 (#78001357)	427-437 S. 4th St. 38°15′07″N 85°45′25″W	
42	Keisker Building		April 11, 2025 (#100011677)	315 Muhammad Ali Blvd; 38°15′04″N 85°45′23″W	
43	Keneseth Israel Synagogue	Keneseth Israel Synagogue	October 29, 1982 (#82001559)	232-236 E. Jacob St. 38°14′38″N 85°45′01″W	
44	Kentucky National Bank	Kentucky National Bank	July 16, 1979 (#79001010)	300 W. Main St. 38°15′22″N 85°45′18″W	
45	Kurfees Paint Company	Kurfees Paint Company	July 30, 2013 (#13000560)	201 E. Market St. 38°15′17″N 85°44′59″W	
46	Levy Brothers Building	Levy Brothers Building	March 24, 1978 (#78001359)	235 W. Market St. 38°15′19″N 85°45′18″W	
47	Loew's and United Artists State Theatre	Loew's and United Artists State Theatre	March 28, 1978 (#78001361)	625 S. 4th St. 38°14′53″N 85°45′28″W	
48	Louisville City Hall Complex	Louisville City Hall Complex	September 1, 1976 (#76000905)	601, 603, 617 W. Jefferson St. 38°15′16″N 85°45′38″W	
49	Louisville College of Dentistry		July 28, 2022 (#100007975)	129 East Broadway; 38°14′45″N 85°45′07″W	
50	Louisville Free Public Library	Louisville Free Public Library	March 27, 1980 (#80001608)	301 W. York St. 38°14′40″N 85°45′28″W	
51	Louisville Grocery Company Building	Louisville Grocery Company Building	April 18, 2003 (#03000258)	231 E. Main St. 38°15′22″N 85°44′54″W	
52	Louisville Municipal Bridge, Pylons and Administration Building	Louisville Municipal Bridge, Pylons and Administration Building	March 8, 1984 (#84001578)	Spans the Ohio River between Louisville and Jeffersonville, IN; 38°15′36″N 85°45′09″W	Extends into Clark County, Indiana
53	Louisville Trust Building	Louisville Trust Building	April 18, 1977 (#77000624)	208 S. 5th St. 38°15′19″N 85°45′31″W	
54	Madrid Building	Madrid Building	July 11, 1985 (#85001509)	545 S. 3rd St. 38°14′58″N 85°45′21″W	
55	Main Street District, Expanded	Main Street District, Expanded	April 1, 1980 (#80001609)	316, 320, 324 and 328 W. Main St. 38°15′23″N 85°45′22″W	
56	Marmaduke Building	Marmaduke Building	July 26, 1991 (#91000921)	520 S. 4th St. 38°15′02″N 85°45′28″W	
57	Mayor Andrew Broaddus	Mayor Andrew Broaddus	June 30, 1989 (#89001446)	401 W. River Rd. 38°15′34″N 85°45′18″W	
58	Miller Paper Company Buildings	Miller Paper Company Buildings	February 11, 2011 (#11000007)	118-122 E. Main St. 38°15′21″N 85°45′02″W	
59	New Enterprise Tobacco Warehouse	New Enterprise Tobacco Warehouse	December 4, 1980 (#80001611)	925 W. Main St. 38°15′23″N 85°45′40″W	
60	Old Presbyterian Theological Seminary	Old Presbyterian Theological Seminary	March 24, 1978 (#78001362)	109 E. Broadway; 38°14′46″N 85°45′10″W	
61	Old U.S. Customshouse and Post Office and Fireproof Storage Company Warehouse	Old U.S. Customshouse and Post Office and Fireproof Storage Company Warehouse	November 23, 1977 (#77000626)	300-314 W. Liberty St. 38°15′10″N 85°45′21″W	Originally listed as the "Old U.S. Customshouse and Post Office"; warehouse added in a boundary increase of May 31, 1980
62	Olds Motor Works		March 4, 2026 (#100009532)	728-730 S. 4th Street; 38°14′41″N 85°45′31″W	
63	Pendennis Club	Pendennis Club	December 4, 2003 (#03001225)	218 W. Muhammad Ali Boulevard; 38°15′02″N 85°45′18″W	
64	Republic Building	Republic Building	August 12, 1982 (#82002718)	429 W. Muhammad Ali Boulevard; 38°15′05″N 85°45′32″W	
65	Ronald–Brennan House	Ronald–Brennan House	August 11, 1975 (#75000774)	631 S. 5th St. 38°14′53″N 85°45′34″W	
66	Rossmore Apartment House	Rossmore Apartment House	November 14, 1978 (#78001365)	22 Theater Sq. 38°14′50″N 85°45′31″W	
67	St. Paul's German Evangelical Church and Parish House	St. Paul's German Evangelical Church and Parish House	February 25, 1982 (#82002724)	213 E. Broadway; 38°14′45″N 85°45′03″W	
68	Savoy Historic District	Savoy Historic District	June 1, 1988 (#88000188)	209-221 W. Jefferson St. 38°15′14″N 85°45′16″W	
69	Sears, Roebuck and Company Store	Sears, Roebuck and Company Store	February 18, 1983 (#83002729)	800 W. Broadway; 38°14′47″N 85°45′56″W	
70	Second and Market Streets Historic District	Second and Market Streets Historic District	March 17, 1988 (#88000186)	Second and Market Sts. 38°15′19″N 85°45′15″W	
71	Seelbach Hotel	Seelbach Hotel	August 12, 1975 (#75000775)	500 S. 4th St. 38°15′03″N 85°45′28″W	
72	Snead Manufacturing Building	Snead Manufacturing Building	August 1, 1978 (#78001367)	817 W. Market St. 38°15′23″N 85°45′52″W	
73	South Central Bell Company Office Building	South Central Bell Company Office Building	December 3, 1980 (#80001620)	521 W. Chestnut St. 38°14′58″N 85°45′38″W	
74	Southern National Bank	Southern National Bank	August 12, 1971 (#71000349)	320 W. Main St. 38°15′23″N 85°45′21″W	Also known as the Old Bank of Louisville; designated a National Historic Landmark on November 11, 1971
75	Speed Building	Speed Building	May 18, 1983 (#83002737)	319 Guthrie St. 38°15′00″N 85°45′24″W	
76	Starks Building	Starks Building	July 11, 1985 (#85001508)	455 S. 4th St. 38°15′05″N 85°45′26″W	
77	Steam Engine Company No. 2	Steam Engine Company No. 2	November 7, 1980 (#80001625)	617-621 W. Jefferson St. 38°15′16″N 85°45′41″W	
78	Stewart's Dry Goods Company Building	Stewart's Dry Goods Company Building	August 12, 1982 (#82002725)	501 S. 4th St. 38°15′03″N 85°45′26″W	
79	W.K. Stewart Bookstore	W.K. Stewart Bookstore	March 24, 2003 (#02001469)	550 S. 4th St. 38°14′59″N 85°45′29″W	
80	Theater Building	Theater Building	August 12, 1982 (#82002726)	625-633 S. 4th St. 38°14′52″N 85°45′28″W	
81	Third and Jefferson Streets Historic District	Third and Jefferson Streets Historic District	March 17, 1988 (#88000190)	301-317 S. 3rd St. and 232-244 Jefferson St. 38°15′12″N 85°45′18″W	
82	Third and Market Streets Historic District	Third and Market Streets Historic District	March 17, 1988 (#88000187)	201-219 S. 3rd St. and 224-240 W. Market St. 38°15′17″N 85°45′18″W	
83	Trade Mart Building	Trade Mart Building	May 25, 1973 (#73000811)	131 W. Main St. 38°15′23″N 85°45′11″W	
84	Tyler Hotel	Tyler Hotel	March 17, 1988 (#88000189)	229-245 W. Jefferson St. 38°15′14″N 85°45′18″W	
85	Tyler-Muldoon House	Tyler-Muldoon House	July 20, 1977 (#77000629)	132 E. Gray St. 38°14′48″N 85°45′06″W	
86	United States Post Office, Court House and Custom House	United States Post Office, Court House and Custom House	March 18, 1999 (#99000334)	601 W. Broadway; 38°14′48″N 85°45′45″W	
87	University of Louisville School of Medicine	University of Louisville School of Medicine	July 30, 1975 (#75000778)	101 W. Chestnut St. 38°14′55″N 85°45′12″W	
88	Walnut Street Theater	Walnut Street Theater	September 1, 1978 (#78001370)	416 W. Muhammad Ali Boulevard; 38°15′04″N 85°45′31″W	
89	Weissinger-Gaulbert Apartments	Weissinger-Gaulbert Apartments	December 12, 1977 (#77000630)	709 S. 3rd St. 38°14′44″N 85°45′24″W	
90	West Main Street Historic District	West Main Street Historic District	March 22, 1974 (#74000884)	W. Main St.; specifically the 600-800 blocks of W. Main St. and the south side of the 500 block 38°15′26″N 85°45′44″W	Specific addresses represent a boundary increase of March 27, 1980
91	Whiskey Row Historic District	Whiskey Row Historic District	June 4, 2010 (#89000385)	101-133 W. Main St. 38°15′23″N 85°45′09″W	
92	Wright and Taylor Building	Wright and Taylor Building	November 15, 1984 (#84000383)	611-617 S. 4th St. 38°14′54″N 85°45′28″W	
93	Y.M.C.A. Building	Y.M.C.A. Building	December 16, 1977 (#77000631)	227-229 W. Broadway; 38°14′46″N 85°45′23″W	

== Former listings ==
	Name on the Register	Image	Date listed	Date removed	Location	Description
1	Louisville Board of Trade Building		August 14, 1973 (#73002254)	August 5, 1975	301 W. Main St.	Demolished in 1975 for widening of Third Street
2	Norton Company Building		May 6, 1982 (#82002714)	February 5, 1991	400 W. Market St.	Demolished in 1990.
3	Old Central High School		September 28, 1970 (#70000905)	June 6, 1972	8th and Chestnut Streets	Demolished on February 27, 1972.
4	Tyler Block	Tyler Block	October 15, 1973 (#73002253)	April 11, 1975	319 West Jefferson	Demolished.

== See also ==
- National Register of Historic Places listings in Jefferson County, Kentucky
- List of National Historic Landmarks in Kentucky
- List of attractions and events in the Louisville metropolitan area
