= Tyler Hotel =

- U.S. National Register of Historic Places
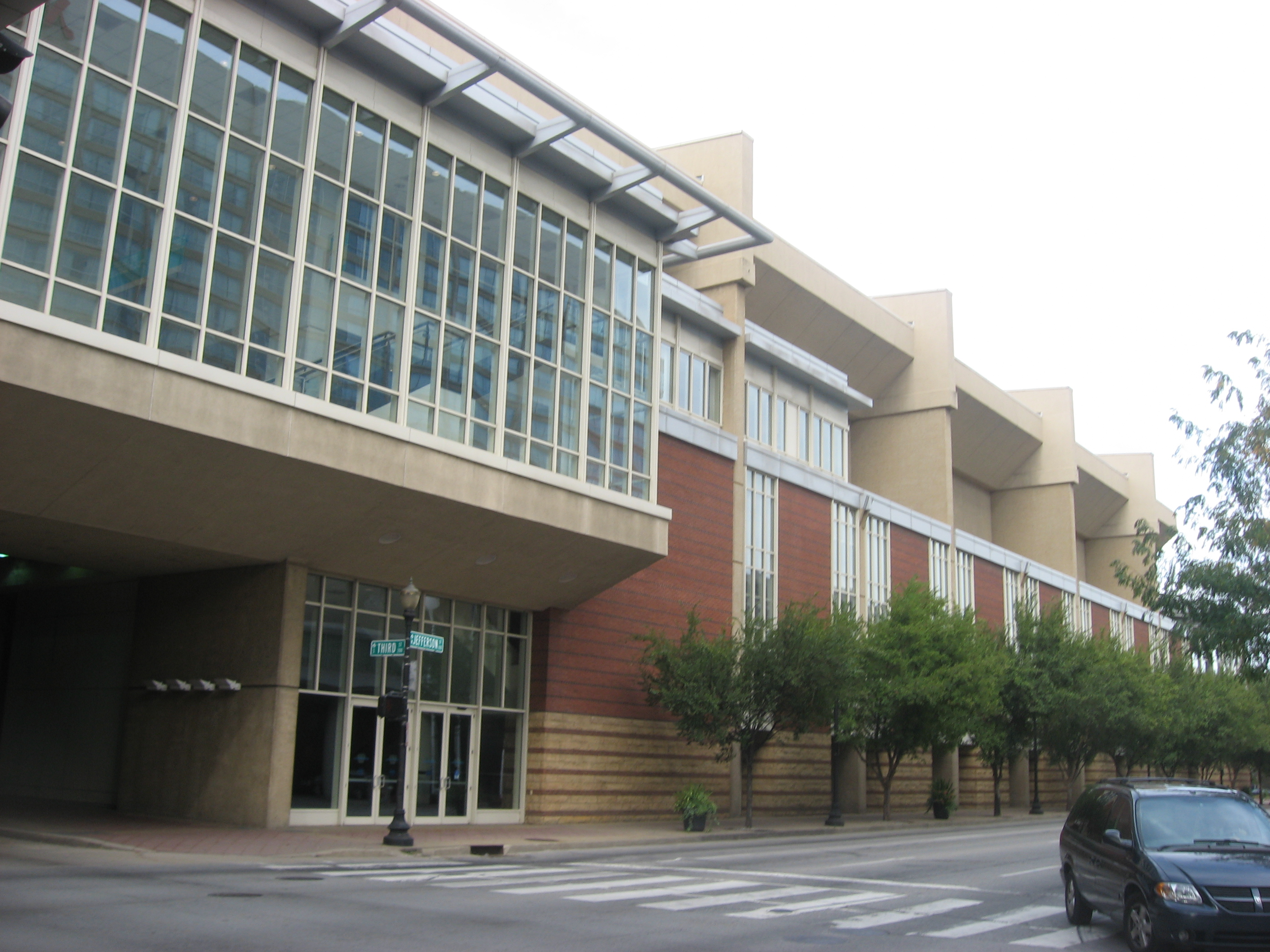
- Convention center at the site of the former hotel

- Location within Kentucky Location within the United States
- Location: Louisville, Kentucky
- Coordinates: 38.2537°N 85.7554°W
- Built: 1911
- Architect: McDonald & Dodd
- NRHP reference No.: 88000189
- Added to NRHP: March 17, 1988

The Tyler Hotel opened in 1911 at Third and Jefferson Streets in Louisville, Kentucky, and for many years it was the only major hotel in the northern part of downtown. The hotel became the Earle Hotel in the late 1940s and then the Milner Hotel in the early 1960s after its new owner, Earle Milner. In 1995, it was torn down to make space for the Kentucky International Convention Center.

== See also ==
- National Register of Historic Places listings in Downtown Louisville, Kentucky
