= Sharon Hordes =

Sharon Hordes was ordained as Reconstructionist Judaism's first cantor in 2002. She earned a Bachelor of Music from the Indiana University Jacobs School of Music. Hordes now serves Keneseth Israel as their cantor.

Hordes was a presenter at the Jewish Reconstructionist Federation convention in 2004.

During her studies at Indiana University, Hordes performed with the university’s Opera Chorus and Chamber Opera programs, gave recital performances, and competed in regional vocal competitions. She also served as cantorial soloist for High Holiday services at the university’s Hillel. After graduating, she worked with the Bureau of Jewish Education in Indianapolis, preparing students for bar and bat mitzvah ceremonies.

Hordes presented workshops on Jewish music at Reconstructionist conventions and participated in interfaith initiatives in South Florida. She also appeared in Your People are Mine, a musical production based on the Book of Ruth.

After relocating to Louisville in 2007, Hordes became head of the Hebrew and Judaica department at Eliahu Academy and later also taught music and tefillah in the Louisville Hebrew School system. In addition to her synagogue work, she has performed in regional Jewish music concerts in the Louisville area. In 2015, she released Mi Coraçon Sopira, an album devoted to Ladino and Sephardic music.
