= Wright and Taylor Building =

- U.S. National Register of Historic Places
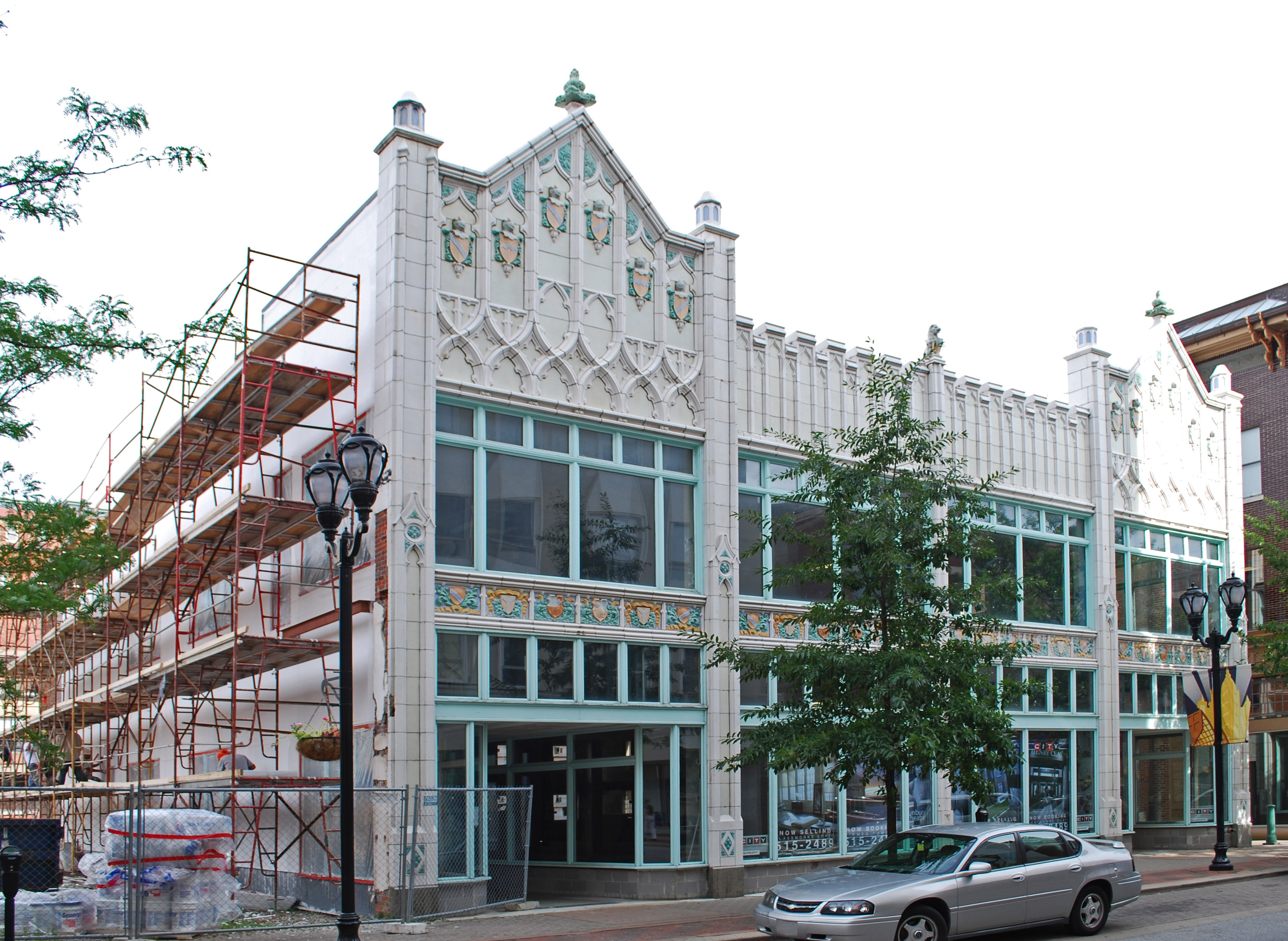
- Location: Louisville, Kentucky
- Coordinates: 38.24847°N 85.75773°W
- Built: 1928
- NRHP reference No.: 84000383
- Added to NRHP: November 15, 1984

The Wright and Taylor Building is a historic building located in the central business district of Louisville, Kentucky.

It was completed in 1928 and added to the National Register of Historic Places in 1984.

The building uses elements of Late Gothic Revival and Tudor Revival style. Wright and Taylor, Inc., built the two-story commercial space. Located at 611-17 S. 4th Street, the building is defined by its use of glazed architectural terra cotta.

Wright and Taylor, Inc., was a distributor of Old Charter bourbon whiskey. The Old Charter Distillery was located on the northwest corner of 4th and Chestnut St., across the street from the Wright and Taylor Building. The building housed small businesses during the prohibition era and through the late 1960s. It was vacant for nearly three decades until the renovated building was opened in 2014 as the Mercury Ballroom, a live music venue.

== See also ==
- National Register of Historic Places listings in Downtown Louisville, Kentucky
