= Business Women's Club =

- Business Women's Club, The
- U.S. National Register of Historic Places
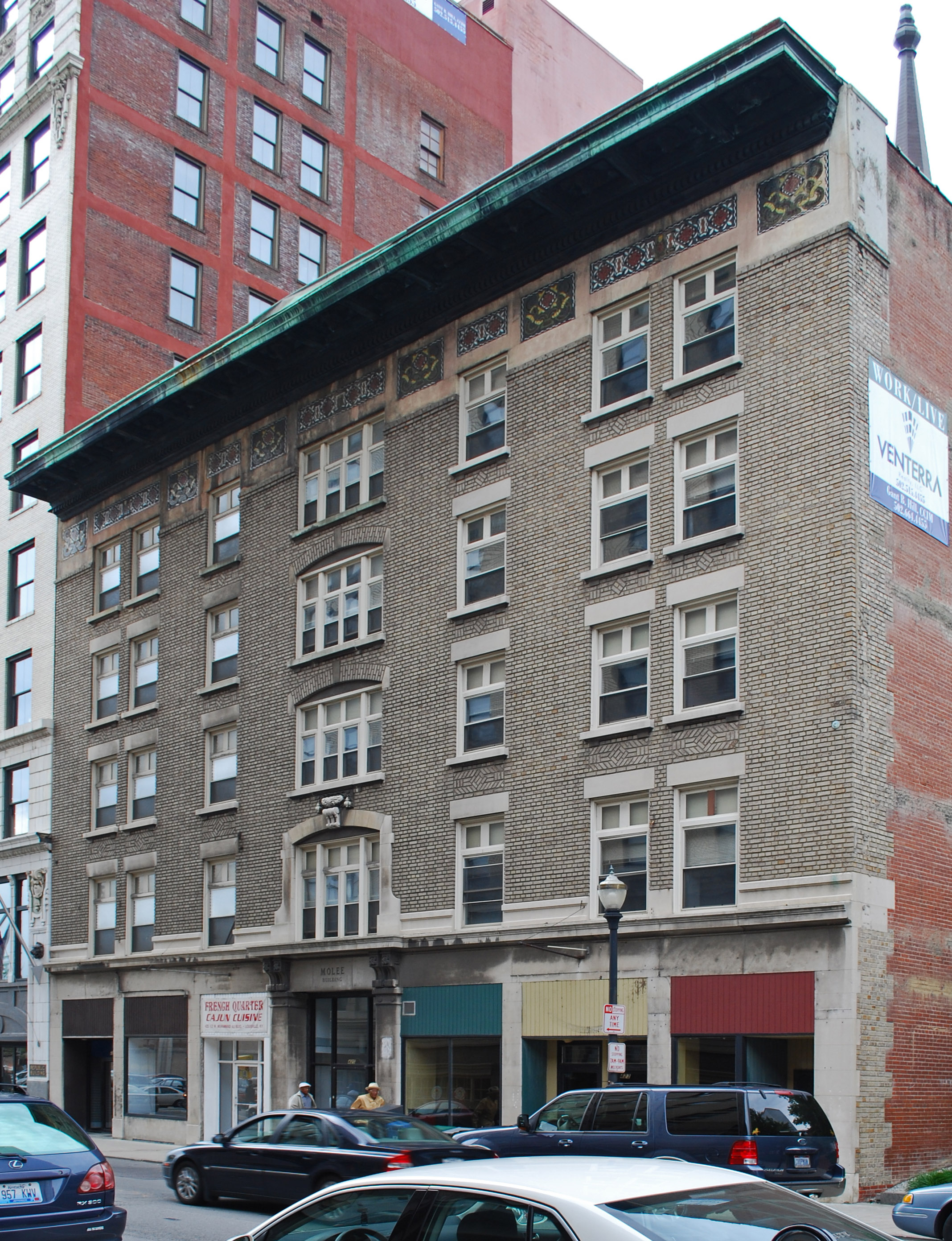

- Location within Kentucky Location within the United States
- Location: Louisville, Kentucky
- Coordinates: 38.25142°N 85.75871°W
- Built: 1911
- Architect: Gray, George Herbert
- Architectural style: Classical Revival
- NRHP reference No.: 08000006
- Added to NRHP: February 7, 2008

The Business Women's Club is a building located on Muhammad Ali Boulevard in Downtown Louisville, Kentucky. It was placed on the National Register of Historic Places on February 7, 2008.

The club was co-founded by Jennie Benedict in 1899.

== See also ==
- National Register of Historic Places listings in Downtown Louisville, Kentucky
