= Mercury Ballroom =

Music venue in Louisville, Kentucky, United States

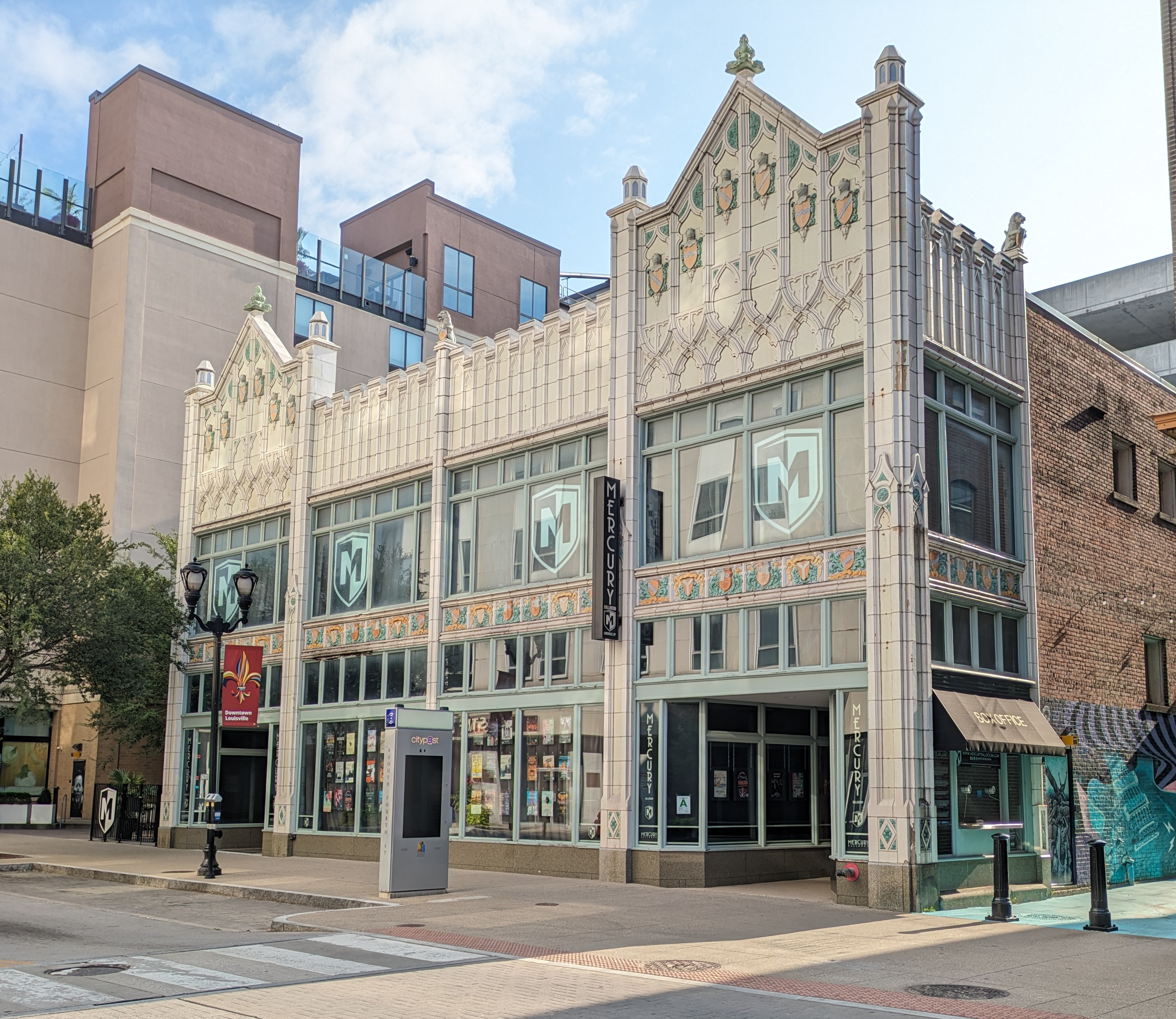
- Front exterior of Mercury Ballroom
- Interactive map of Mercury Ballroom
- Address: 611 S 4th St
- Location: Louisville, Kentucky
- Coordinates: 38.2485°N 85.7578°W
- Capacity: 900

Construction
- Opened: 2014

Website
- www.mercuryballroom.com

The Mercury Ballroom is a music venue in downtown Louisville, Kentucky, United States. The 900-capacity venue, housed in the Wright and Taylor Building at Fourth and Chestnut streets, is operated by Live Nation's House of Blues Entertainment division.

== See also ==
- List of attractions and events in the Louisville metropolitan area
