= Joseph & Joseph =

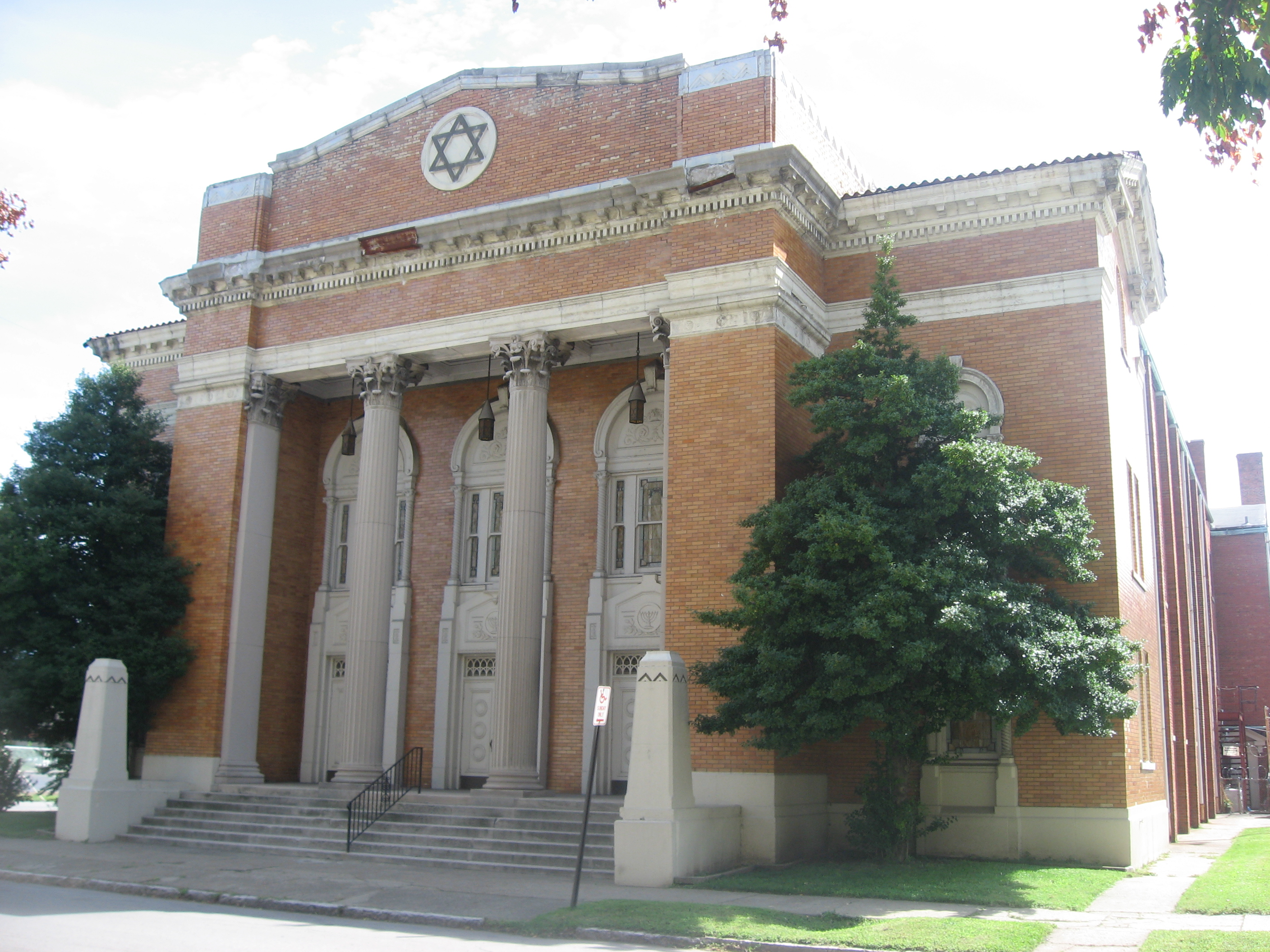
Keneseth Israel Synagogue

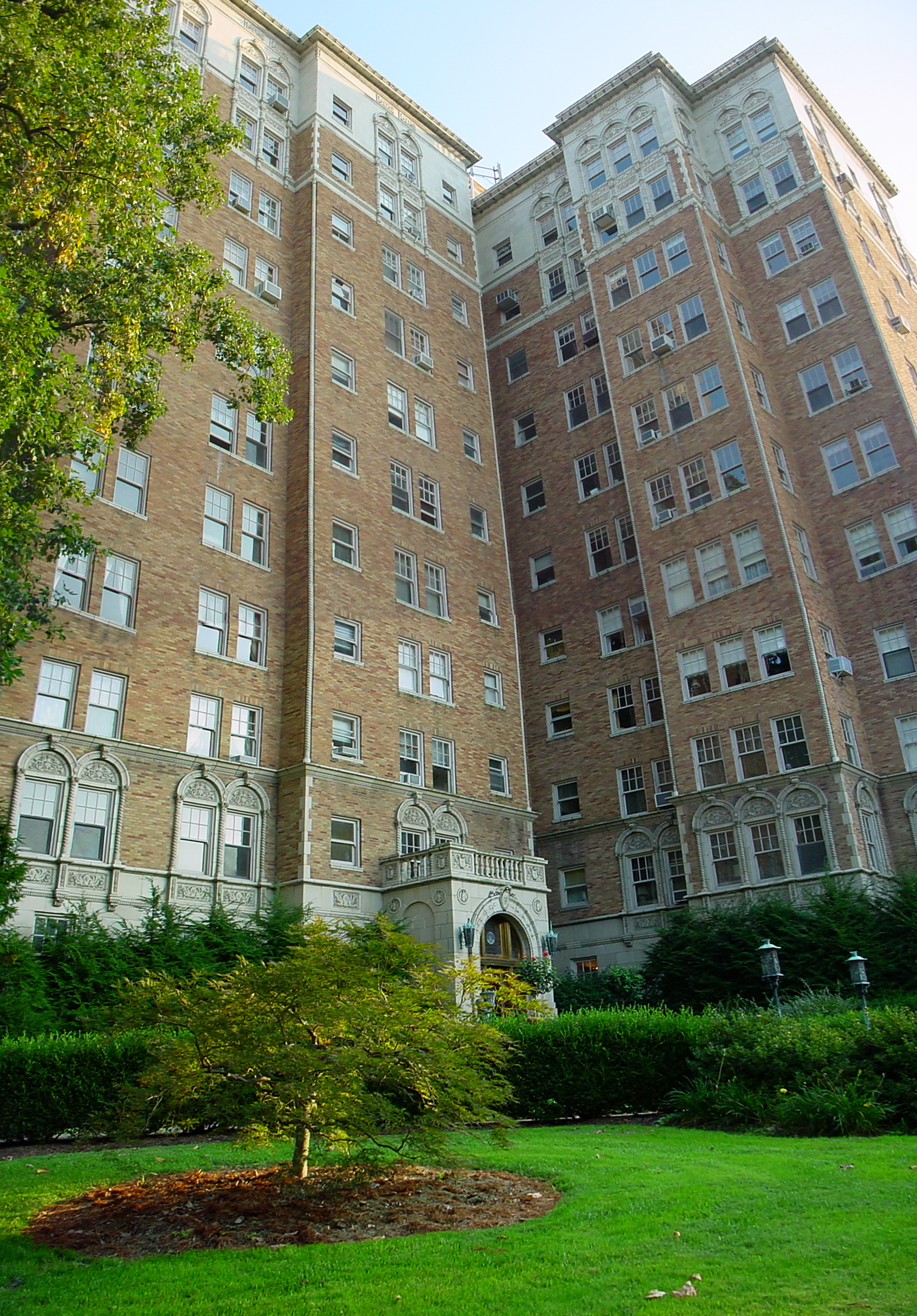
Commodore Condominiums

Joseph & Joseph is an architectural firm founded in 1908 in Louisville, Kentucky. The main services include architectural, engineering and design projects.

The firm designed many buildings listed on the U.S. National Register of Historic Places. Their Louisville work includes the city's Rialto Theatre (since destroyed), Kentucky Theatre, Commodore Apartments, Willow Terrace and Dartmouth Apartments, and the Breslim Building (Fincastle Building).

== Overview ==
Joseph & Joseph was established by Alfred Joseph and his younger brother Oscar in 1908. Alfred's architectural training included working under the McDonald Brothers, under McDonald and Sheblessy, and under McDonald and Dodd. In those firms he worked on designs for Louisville's Presbyterian Seminary, Temple Adath Israel, and the original Weissinger-Gaulbert building. Oscar was trained at the University of Michigan as a civil engineer. The first commission of the firm was a shoe shine parlor. The first major commission was the old Kentucky State Fair Building.

In 1964, engineer Cass Moter became a partner in the firm and his son Merrill joined the staff in 1973 and became a partner in 1982.

In 2004, Cash Moter, Merrill's son, became a part of staff and then, in 2013, a partner.

In 2018, Eric Huelsman joined Joseph & Joseph and became a partner in 2020.

In 2020, the company acquired Bravura Corporation. After the merger, the name was changed to Joseph&Joseph+Bravura Architects.

== Works ==
Works (with attribution) include:

- Kentucky State Fair Building (1908?), western Louisville
- Almsted Brothers Building, 425 W. Market St., Louisville, KY (Joseph & Joseph) NRHP-listed
- Brass Finishing Building, Standard Sanitary Manufacturing Company, 1547 S. 7th St., Louisville, KY (Joseph & Joseph) NRHP-listed
- Commodore Apartment Building (Louisville, Kentucky), 2140 Bonnycastle Ave., Louisville, KY (Joseph & Joseph) NRHP-listed
- Elks Athletic Club (1924), 604 S. 3rd St., Louisville, KY (Joseph & Joseph) NRHP-listed
- J. Stoddard Johnston Elementary School, 2301 Bradley Blvd., Louisville, KY (Joseph & Joseph) NRHP-listed
- Keneseth Israel Synagogue (Calvary Cathedral)
- Morehead State University, Bounded by University Blvd., Battson Ave. and Ward Oates Dr., Morehead, KY (Joseph & Joseph) NRHP-listed
- Old Normal School Building, Murray State University campus, Murray, KY (Joseph & Joseph) NRHP-listed
- Republic Building, 429 W. Muhammad Ali Blvd., Louisville, KY (Joseph & Joseph) NRHP-listed
- Arthur P. Stitzel House, 9707 Shelbyville Rd., Louisville, KY (Joseph & Joseph) NRHP-listed
- Warehouse A, Brown-Forman Corporation, 18th and Howard Sts., Louisville, KY (Joseph & Joseph) NRHP-listed
- The Atherton, later renamed the Francis Building, at the Southwest corner of 4th and Chestnut Streets
- East Broadway Theater, Office Resource Inc. building, at 833 East Broadway
- J. Stoddard Johnson School at Bradley Avenue north of Warnock
- Kosair Crippled Children's Hospital, on Eastern Parkway
- Kosair Shrine Temple at 218 E. Broadway
- Bonnie Apartments, later renamed the Highlander Apartments, at 1028 Cherokee Rd.
- Dartmouth-Willow Terrace Condominiums at 1412 Willow Ave.
- Homes at 734, 1420 and 1434 Cherokee Road and at 235 S. Galt
- Brown-Forman Corp., Forester Center Dixie Highway Campus
- Kurfees Paint, 201 E. Market St.
- One or more works in Green Tree Manor Residential Historic District, 107 Fenley Ave., Louisville, KY (Joseph & Joseph) NRHP-listed
- One or more works in Shelby County Courthouse and Main Street Commercial District, Roughly bounded by Washington, Clay, 4th and 6th Sts. Shelbyville, KY (Joseph & Joseph) NRHP-listed
- One or more works in Third and Market Streets Historic District, 201—219 S. Third St. and 224—240 W. Market St., Louisville, KY (Joseph & Joseph) NRHP-listed

=== Distillery projects ===
- Four Roses Distillery, 1224 Bonds Mill Rd, Lawrenceburg, KY 40342 (1910)
- Stitzel Weller Distillery in Shively, Kentucky (1935)
- Seagram Distillery in Montreal, Quebec, Canada on Seventh Street Road (1937)
- Lux Row Distillers, 1 Lux Row, 3050 E John Rowan Blvd, Bardstown, KY(2016)
- Jeptha Creed Distillery, 500 Gordon Ln, Shelbyville, KY 40065 (2016)
