= Ronald–Brennan House =

- U.S. National Register of Historic Places
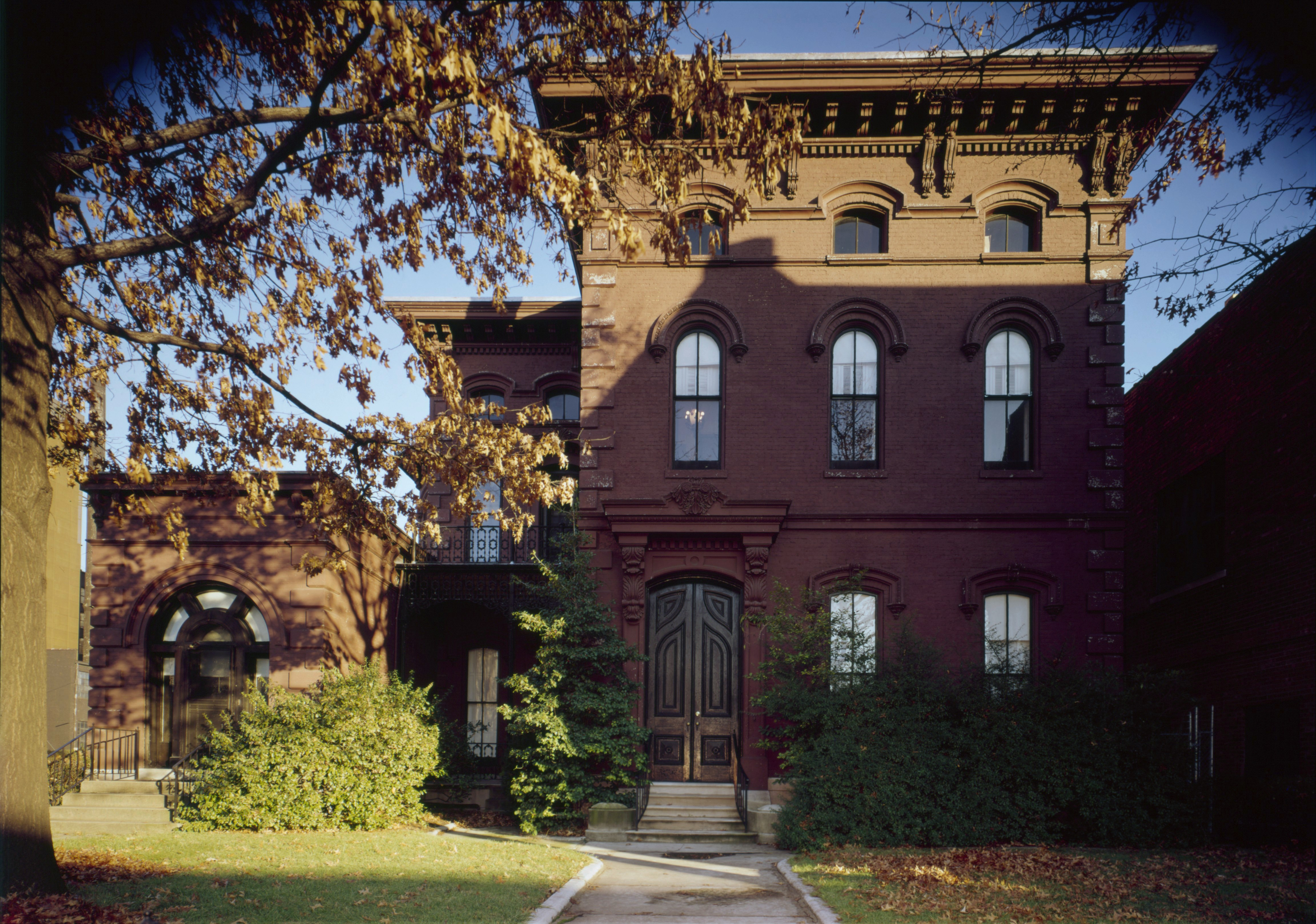
- HABS photo of the house in 1973
- Interactive map of Ronald–Brennan House
- Location: 631 South 5th Street; Louisville, Kentucky 40202
- Coordinates: 38°14′52″N 85°45′32″W
- Built: 1868
- Architectural style: Italianate
- Website: vitalsites.org/site/brennan-house/
- NRHP reference No.: 75000774
- Added to NRHP: August 11, 1975

The Ronald–Brennan House, often referred to as just the Brennan House, is a historic Italianate townhouse located in Downtown Louisville, Kentucky. It was listed on the National Register of Historic Places on August 11, 1975. The house was voted one of the top ten favorite buildings in Louisville by local residents in a contest by The Courier-Journal.

== History ==
The house was built in 1868 for tobacco merchant Francis Ronald. In 1884, it was sold for $12,000 to Thomas Brennan, an equipment manufacturer and inventor who was originally from Ireland. He and his wife, Anna, had eight children who grew up in the house. Thomas Brennan (1838–1914) received accolades for his inventions, including two prizes at the 1893 Chicago World's Fair. He was co-owner and vice president of Brennan & Co., SouthWestern Agricultural Works, a manufacturer of farm machinery.

The three-story townhouse has six bedrooms and features 16-foot ceilings. It was designed with stained-glass windows, an expansive veranda, hand-carved marble and slate mantels, and crystal chandeliers. The Brennan home was among the first in Louisville to have electric lights.

Two of the Brennan sons became doctors, and one of them, Dr. J. A. O. Brennan, added a north wing to the house in 1912 for medical office space with waiting and exam rooms.

One of Brennan's sons continued to live in the house until his death in 1963. At that time, the house was left to the Filson Club.

The house was operated by the Filson Club (today called The Filson Historical Society) as a house museum from 1969 until 1992, when a non-profit organization was created by the club to manage the house, as well as to help defray the costs of maintaining it.

== Today ==
The Brennan House is now the home of Vital Sites (formerly Louisville Preservation Fund), a non-profit organization focused on revitalizing Louisville through strategic redevelopment of abandoned or neglected spaces. The house is available for group tours and can be rented for weddings, parties, and other events. Annual Victorian holiday tours are held at the house.

Inside, the house has been preserved with original interior finishes and lighting. The furnishings are from the Brennan family's personal collection. Some of the original items in the house include family photographs, a signed Tiffany lamp, hand-carved furniture, a stained glass coat of arms by Louisville artist Bernard Alberts, and steamer trunks filled with world travel memorabilia. The medical office addition has been preserved with an exam table, equipment and medical volumes from the early 20th century.

The house has been reported as a haunted site in Louisville.

== See also ==
- National Register of Historic Places listings in Downtown Louisville, Kentucky
- List of attractions and events in the Louisville metropolitan area
- List of museums in the Louisville metropolitan area
