= Keneseth Israel (Louisville, Kentucky) =

Synagogue in Louisville, Kentucky

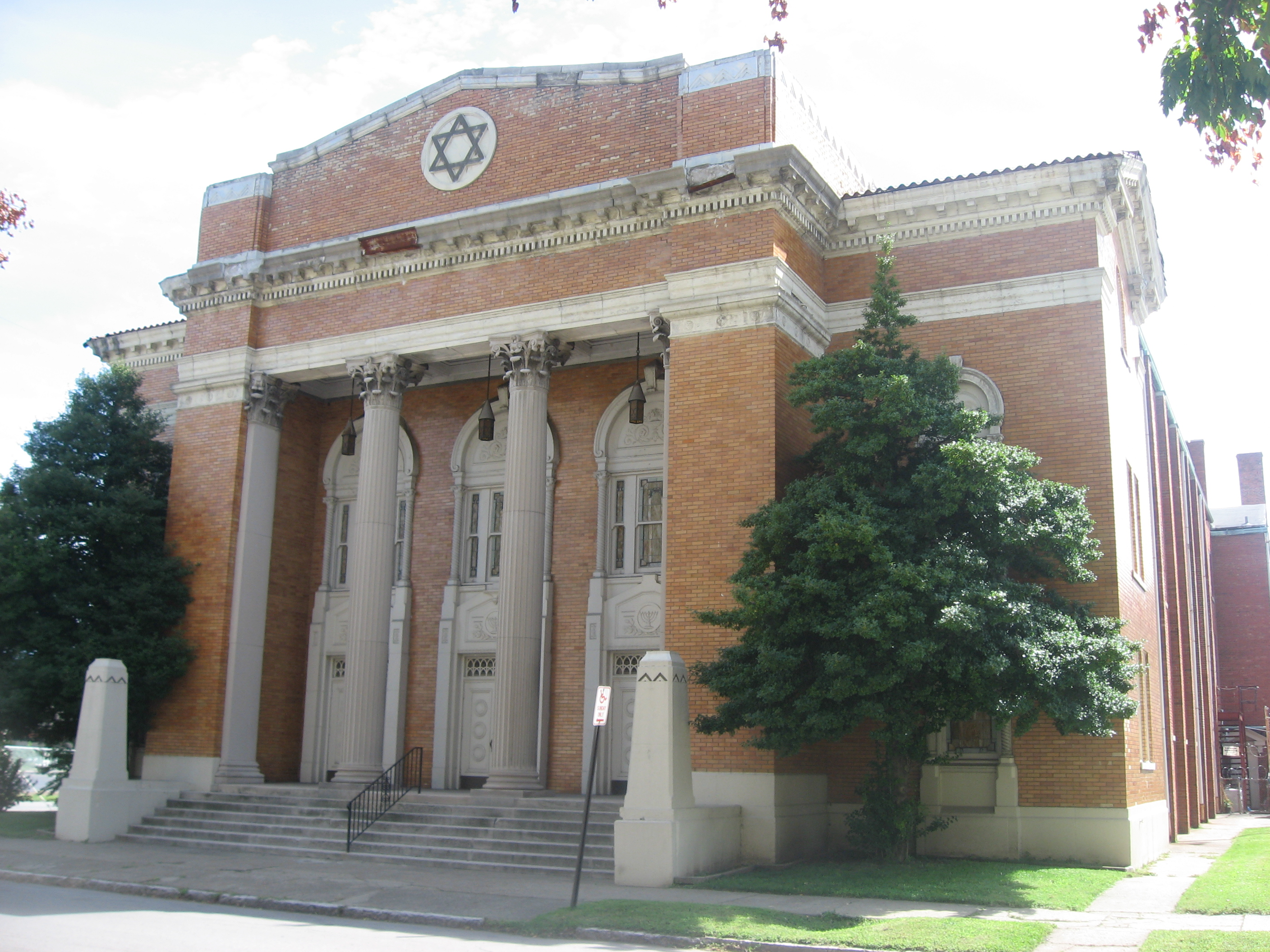
- Keneseth Israel Congregation

- Location in Kentucky

Religion
- Affiliation: Conservative Judaism
- Ecclesiastical or organizational status: Synagogue
- Leadership: Rabbi Ben Freed
- Status: Active

Location
- Location: 2531 Taylorsville Road, Louisville, Kentucky
- Interactive map of Keneseth Israel
- Administration: United Synagogue of Conservative Judaism
- Coordinates: 38°13′26.6″N 85°40′29.5″W

Architecture
- Architect: Joseph & Joseph (1928)
- Type: Synagogue
- Established: 1882 (as a congregation)
- Completed: 1901 (E. Jefferson Street); 1928 (East Jacob Street); 1964 (Taylorsville Road)

Website
- kenesethisrael.com

Keneseth Israel is a Conservative synagogue located at 2531 Taylorsville Road, Louisville, Kentucky, in the United States. The congregation's original synagogue building was constructed in Louisville in 1928. It was designed by Joseph & Joseph and was listed on the National Register of Historic Places. The original synagogue building suffered extensive damage in a fire in 2021 and after a structural assessment, was demolished.

== History ==
The congregation was founded in 1882 as an Orthodox congregation, B'nai Jacob, and merged with another Orthodox congregation, Beth HaMedrash HaGadol in 1926 to create Keneseth Israel Congregation. In 1928, the congregation had a synagogue built at 232–236 East Jacob Street in Louisville. The congregation moved to its current home in 1964.

The earliest building was a former church. In 1901, the congregation, then B'nai Israel, dedicated a new building on the site of the former church building at 432 E. Jefferson Street. The building has twin towers with pyramid-form roofs and was striped in red-and-white in the Moorish Revival style then fashionable for synagogues.

For most of its history, Keneseth Israel was an Orthodox synagogue affiliated with the Union of Orthodox Jewish Congregations of America. In 1994, its members voted to affiliate with the United Synagogue of Conservative Judaism.

== Clergy ==
The congregation is led by Rabbi Ben Freed and Cantor Sharon Hordes.

== See also ==
- National Register of Historic Places listings in Downtown Louisville, Kentucky
