= Elks Athletic Club =

- U.S. National Register of Historic Places
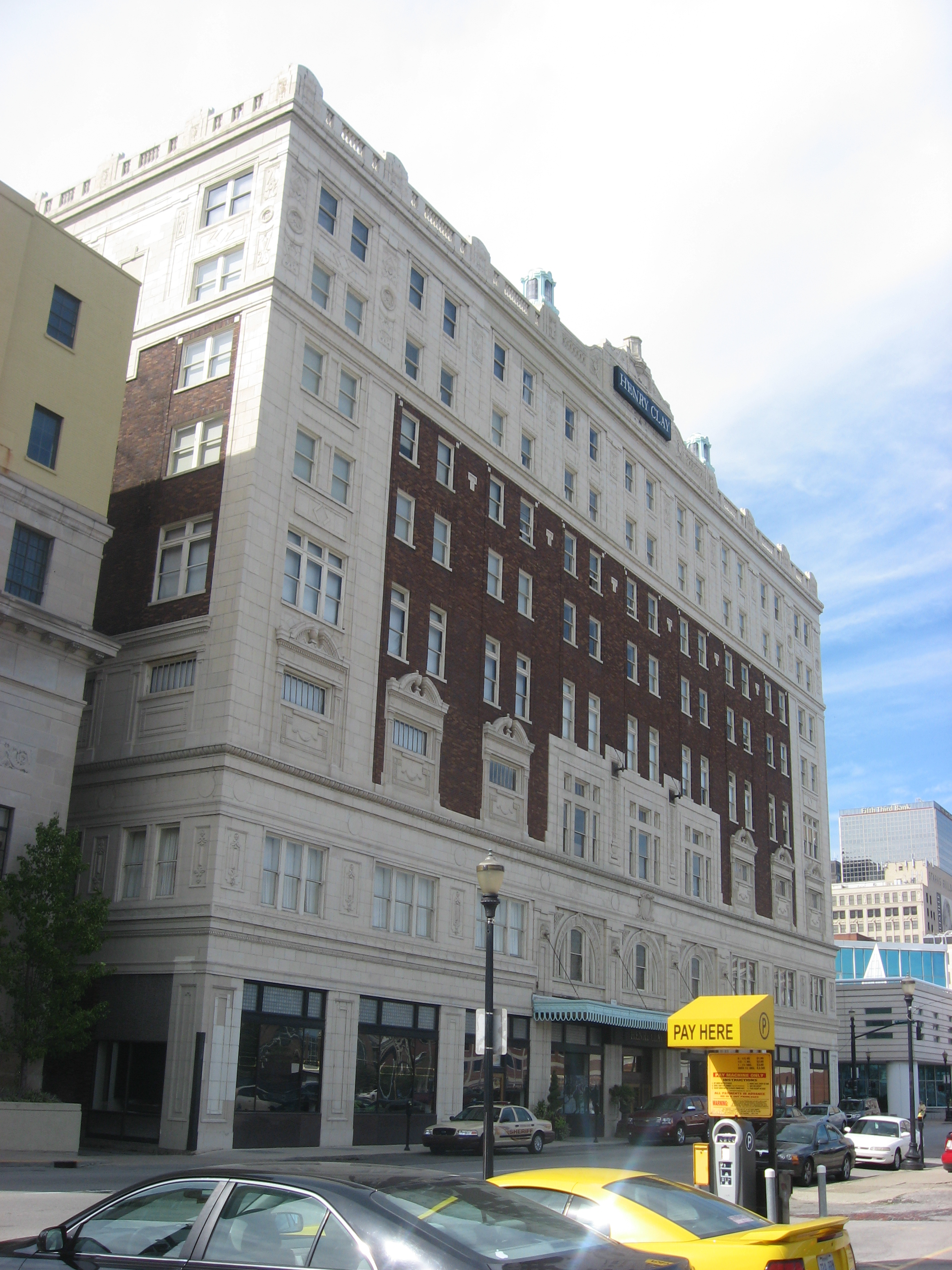
- Front of the building

- Location within Kentucky Location within the United States
- Location: 604 S. 3rd St., Louisville, Kentucky
- Coordinates: 38°14′55″N 85°45′23″W
- Area: 2.4 acres (0.97 ha)
- Built: 1924
- Architect: Joseph & Joseph
- Architectural style: Classical Revival
- NRHP reference No.: 79001003
- Added to NRHP: July 16, 1979

Elks Athletic Club, also known as YWCA, in Louisville, Kentucky, is an eight-story building that was built in 1924. It was designed by Joseph & Joseph in Classical Revival style.

It was sold and adapted into use as a hotel four years after it was built. It served as a hotel until 1963, then became a YWCA.

It was listed on the National Register of Historic Places in 1979.
