= Republic Building (Louisville, Kentucky) =

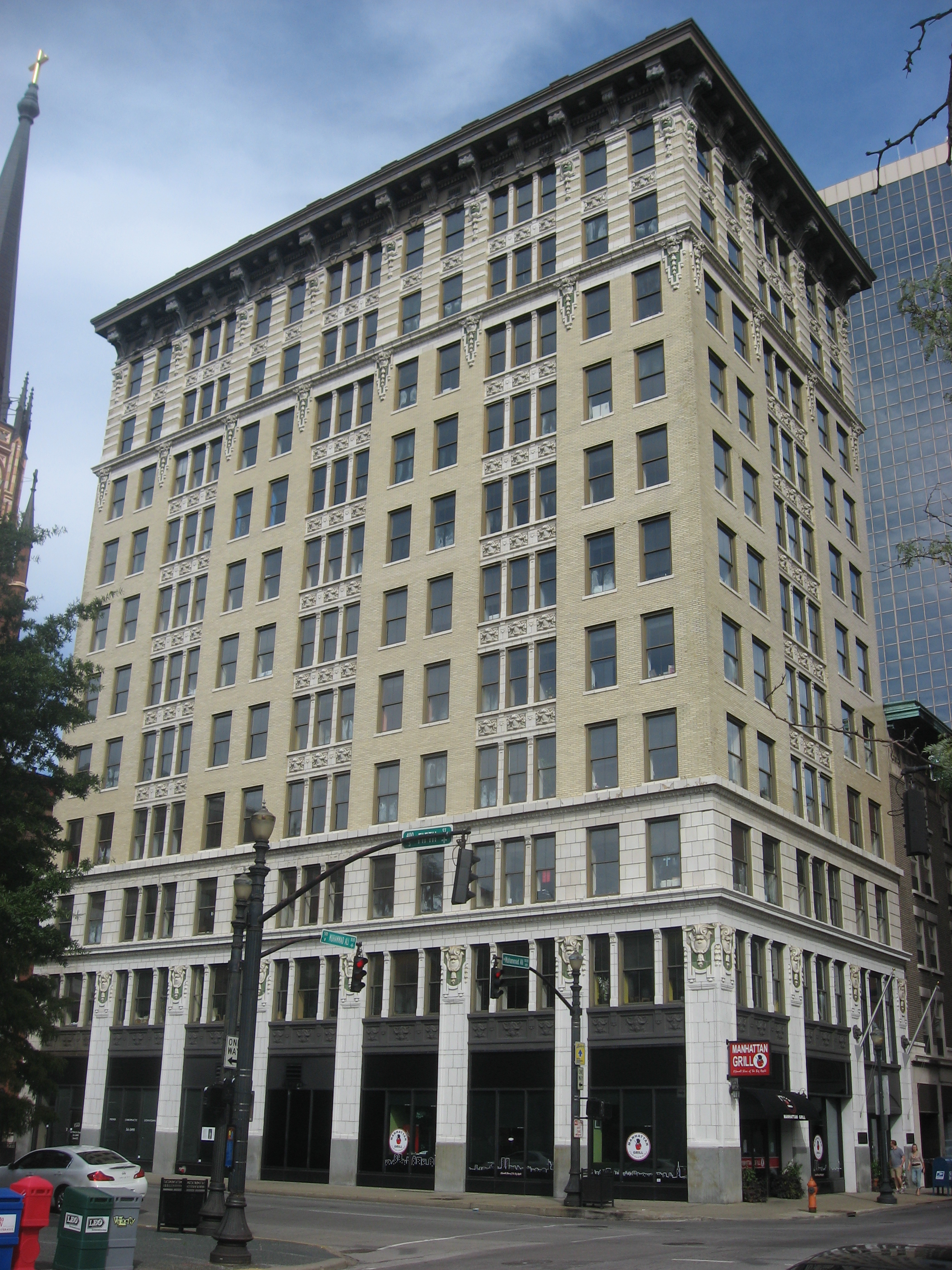
- The Republic Building, which will be rehabilitated into a boutique hotel.
- Interactive map of the Republic Building area

General information
- Type: Commercial/Office
- Location: 429 W Muhammad Ali Blvd Louisville, Kentucky 40202 United States
- Coordinates: 38.25156°N 85.75894°W
- Construction started: 1912
- Completed: 1916

Technical details
- Floor count: 11
- Floor area: 62,370 square feet

Design and construction
- Architect: Joseph and Joseph

The Republic Building is a historic commercial building located in Louisville, Kentucky.The building is located at the northeast corner of Fifth Street and Muhammad Ali Boulevard, and neighbors the historic Starks Building. Prior to the renaming of several streets, Muhammad Ali Boulevard was known as Walnut Street. The mailing address is 429 West Muhammad Ali Boulevard. The building is one of the early Louisville office buildings to be designed by the prominent local architecture firm Joseph and Joseph, which still operates today. The architecture of the Republic Building was strongly influenced by the classical revival movement, specifically elements of the Italian Renaissance.

== History ==
The Republic Building began construction in 1912 by builder C. A. Koerner and Company, and was completed in 1916. The building is the work of the local architectural firm of Joseph and Joseph, founded by brothers Alfred and Oscar Joseph. Alfred began his architectural career with the office of McDonald & Dodd. The firm of Joseph & Joseph was founded in 1908 and their early works reflect the influence of both Dodd and the McDonald Brothers. The work of Joseph and Joseph in the first quarter of the twentieth century shows an emphasis towards Mediterranean influence, especially that of the Spanish and Italian Renaissance. The use of terracotta and glazed brick, a rich sense of color and textural contrast, are all features of their work. These features are all evident in the Republic Building. The structure is one of the major early works of the firm to survive. The original owner was Republic Realty in 1915. Subsequent owners include Byron & Lula Brubaker (1944), Robert A. Futterman (1955), Republic Investors (1956), BHS Co. and Republic Assocs. (1974), and Oxford Properties (1980). On August 12, 1982, the Republic Building was added to the National Register of Historic Places. The Republic Building was purchased for $3,150,000 by the National Historic Property Developer and real estate company Hudson Holdings on July 31, 2015. Hudson Holdings plans to preserve the historic building, and rehabilitate it into a boutique hotel building.
