= Kentucky Route 207 =

State highway in Kentucky, United States

Kentucky Route 207
- KY 207 highlighted in red

Route information
- Maintained by KYTC
- Length: 23.9 mi (38.5 km)

Major junctions
- South end: KY 1654 near Rush
- US 60 near Rush; KY 1 in Argillite; KY 67 near Argillite; KY 693 in Flatwoods; KY 750 in Flatwoods
- North end: US 23 in Flatwoods

Location
- Country: United States
- State: Kentucky
- Counties: Carter, Greenup

Highway system
- Kentucky State Highway System; Interstate; US; State; Parkways
← KY 206	→ KY 208

Kentucky Route 207 (KY 207) is a 23.9-mile-long (38.5 km) state highway in the U.S. state of Kentucky. The highway connects mostly rural areas of Carter and Greenup counties with Argillite and Flatwoods.

== Route description ==
KY 207 begins at an intersection with KY 1654 (Williams Creek Road) west-southwest of Rush, within Carter County. It travels to the west-northwest and passes O'Neal Cemetery before curving to the north-northwest. The highway has a very brief concurrency with U.S. Route 60 (US 60). When the two highways split, KY 207 travels to the north-northeast. Then, it passes Sally Cemetery. The highway then travels to the north-northwest. It has two crossings of Cane Creek before it crosses over Interstate 64 (I-64). It heads to the north and crosses Cane Creek again. It enters Greenup County and then curves to the north-northeast. The highway crosses over Logtown Hollow before curving to the north-northwest. It crosses Cane Creek for a third time and curves to the north to a crossing of Caudle Branch. Then, it crosses over McCall Hollow and curves to the north-northeast. KY 207 crosses over Tunnel Branch before intersecting the eastern terminus of KY 3306 (Tunnel Branch Road) in Hunnewell. The highway crosses over Cane Creek one final time and then curves to the north-northwest. It crosses over Sawmill Branch. Then, the highway curves to the northeast and crosses Sandsuck Creek. The highway then enters Argillite, where it begins a concurrency with KY 1. The two highways pass a U.S. Post Office and curve to the northeast. They cross the East Fork Little Sandy River before they split. KY 207 heads in a fairly east-southeast direction. It has an interchange with KY 67 (Industrial Parkway). The highway curves to the east-northeast, crosses Old Stream Branch, and intersects KY 503 (Uhlens Branch Road). The two highways travel concurrently to the southeast for a short distance. When they split, KY 207 resumes its east-northeast direction and enters Flatwoods. At Bellefonte Road, it has a very brief concurrency with KY 693. In the main part of Flatwoods, the highway intersects KY 750 (Lexington Avenue/Powell Lane). In the far northeastern part of the city, it meets its northern terminus, an intersection with US 23. Here, the roadway continues as an unnamed local road.

== Major intersections ==
County	Location	mi	km	Destinations	Notes
Carter		0.0	0.0	KY 1654 (Williams Creek Road)	Southern terminus
Carter		2.2	3.5	US 60 west – Grayson	Southern end of US 60 concurrency
Carter		2.3	3.7	US 60 east – Ashland	Northern end of US 60 concurrency
Greenup	Hunnewell	7.5	12.1	KY 3306 west (Tunnel Branch Road)	Eastern terminus of KY 3306
Greenup	Argillite	14.0	22.5	KY 1 south	Southern end of KY 1 concurrency
Greenup		15.2	24.5	KY 1 north – Greenup	Northern end of KY 1 concurrency
Greenup		17.0	27.4	KY 67 (Industrial Parkway) – Wurtland	Interchange
Greenup		18.3	29.5	KY 503 north (Uhlens Branch Road)	Southern end of KY 503 concurrency
Greenup		18.8	30.3	KY 503 south (Naples Road)	Northern end of KY 503 concurrency
Greenup	Flatwoods	21.8	35.1	KY 693 west (Bellefonte Road)	Southern end of KY 693 concurrency
Greenup	Flatwoods	22.1	35.6	KY 693 east (Bellefonte Road)	Northern end of KY 693 concurrency
Greenup	Flatwoods	22.7	36.5	KY 750 (Lexington Avenue/Powell Lane)	
Greenup	Flatwoods	23.9	38.5	US 23 – Ashland, Greenup	Northern terminus
1.000 mi = 1.609 km; 1.000 km = 0.621 mi
