= Kentucky Route 1 =

State highway in Kentucky

Kentucky Route 1
- KY 1 highlighted in red

Route information
- Maintained by KYTC
- Length: 48.486 mi (78.031 km)

Major junctions
- South end: KY 3 east of Cadmus
- US 60 / KY 7 in Grayson; I-64 in Grayson; AA Hwy (KY 9) in Grayson
- North end: US 23 / KY 2541 in Greenup

Location
- Country: United States
- State: Kentucky
- Counties: Lawrence, Carter, Greenup

Highway system
- Kentucky State Highway System; Interstate; US; State; Parkways
← KY 9007	→ KY 2

Kentucky Route 1 (KY 1) is a 48.486-mile-long (78.031 km) state highway in the U.S. state of Kentucky. It originates at a junction with KY 3, one mile (1.6 km) east of Cadmus in Lawrence County. The route continues through Grayson in Carter County to terminate at US 23 in Greenup in Greenup County. Part of the highway is co-signed with the Jenny Wiley Trail. Segments of KY 1 are built upon the old Eastern Kentucky Railroad. KY 1 follows parts of the Little Sandy River and parts of a smaller fork of the Little Sandy called the Little Fork upstream of Grayson.

Kentucky Route 1 allows access to Greenbo Lake State Resort Park and River Bend Golf Course, as well to the Oldtown Covered Bridge and the Jesse Stuart Nature Preserve. For general travel between Grayson and Greenup, Kentucky Route 67 is suggested over the much narrower and twisting Route 1.

Caney Falls, on the Little Fork of the Little Sandy, is to the south of Route 1, between Grayson and Route 3.

== Route description ==
The route originates at a junction with KY 3, one mile (1.6 km) east of Cadmus in Lawrence County and winds southwest for 3.640 miles (5.858 km) until it meets KY 828 and turns more toward the west. At KY 201 in Webbville KY 1 turns toward the northwest, then toward the north in Carter County. In Grayson KY 1 overlaps with US 60, crosses over Interstate 64, meets the eastern terminus of KY 9 (AA Highway), and intersects with KY 7. Roughly 6.5 miles (10.5 km) north of Grayson, KY 1 enters Greenup County. 17.134 miles (27.575 km) north of the Carter-Greenup County line KY 1 meets its northern terminus at US 23 in Greenup just south of the Ohio River.

== Major intersections ==
County	Location	mi	km	Destinations	Notes
Lawrence		0.00	0.00	KY 3 – Ashland, Louisa	Southern terminus
Lawrence		3.640	5.858	KY 828 south	north terminus of KY 828
Lawrence	Webbville	12.820	20.632	KY 201 south – Blaine	Northern terminus of KY 201
Carter		14.163	22.793	KY 486 west	Eastern terminus of KY 486
Carter	Willard	15.299	24.621	KY 1496 east	Southern end of KY 1496 overlap
Carter	Willard	15.982	25.721	KY 1496 west	Northern end of KY 1496 overlap
Carter	Hitchins	21.049	33.875	KY 773 (Kouns Road)	
Carter	Grayson	24.786	39.889	US 60 east – Ashland	south end of US 60 overlap
Carter	Grayson			KY 3297 east (Robert & Mary Avenue)	
Carter	Grayson	25.478	41.003	US 60 west (Main Street) / KY 7 south (Carol Malone Boulevard) – Olive Hill, Sandy Hook, Grayson Lake State Park, Carter Caves State Resort Park	Northern end of US 60 overlap/Southern end of KY 7 overlap
Carter	Grayson	26.375	42.446	I-64 – Lexington, Ashland	I-64 exit 172
Carter	Grayson			KY 1947	
Carter		26.841	43.196	AA Hwy (KY 9) north – Vanceburg, Maysville	south terminus of KY 9
Carter	Pactolus	27.636	44.476	KY 7 north	Northern end of KY 7 overlap
Carter	Pactolus	27.768	44.688	KY 1910 east	Western terminus of KY 1910
Greenup	Hopewell	31.930	51.386	KY 3306 east (Tunnel Branch Road)	Western terminus of KY 3306
Greenup		32.556	52.394	KY 784 north (Lost Creek Road)	south terminus of KY 784
Greenup		40.937	65.882	KY 1711 west (Greenbo Road) – Greenbo Lake State Resort Park	Eastern terminus of KY 1711
Greenup		42.180	67.882	KY 1459 (Low Gap Road)	Southern terminus of KY 1459
Greenup	Argillite	42.740	68.783	KY 207 south	Southern end of KY 207 overlap
Greenup		44.002	70.814	KY 207 north	Northern end of KY 207 overlap
Greenup		46.566	74.941	KY 2433 west – W Hollow	east terminus of KY 2433
Greenup	Greenup	48.486	78.031	US 23 / KY 2541 north	Northern terminus
1.000 mi = 1.609 km; 1.000 km = 0.621 mi: Concurrency terminus
