= Kentucky Route 67 =

State highway in Kentucky, USA

Kentucky Route 67
- Industrial Parkway
- KY 67 highlighted in red

Route information
- Maintained by KYTC
- Length: 14.219 mi (22.883 km)
- Existed: 2002–present

Major junctions
- South end: I-64 near Grayson
- US 23 in Wurtland
- North end: KY 3105 in Wurtland

Location
- Country: United States
- State: Kentucky
- Counties: Greenup, Carter, Boyd

Highway system
- Kentucky State Highway System; Interstate; US; State; Parkways
← KY 66	→ US 68

Kentucky Route 67 (KY 67) is a Kentucky State Highway originating at a junction with Interstate 64 (I-64) near Grayson, Kentucky in Carter County. The route continues through rural ridgetops in Greenup County and briefly touches Boyd County before terminating at U.S. Route 23 (US 23) in Greenup County in between Wurtland and Greenup. KY 67 is also known as the Industrial Parkway.

== Route description ==
KY 67 lies within the Ohio–Kentucky Carboniferous Plateau, a hilly mosaic of woodland, pastureland, and cropland. The highway begins at a trumpet interchange at I-64 east of Grayson southwest of the Carter–Greenup–Boyd county tripoint. At the north end of the interchange, KY 67 leaves northeastern Carter County and enters southeastern Greenup County. The highway crosses over Logtown Road and intersects EastPark Drive, which serves the south unit of the eponymous business park. KY 67 enters the western fringe of Boyd County, within which the route crosses over Addington Road before re-entering Greenup County. The highway intersects Technology Drive, which serves the north unit of the business park, including a campus of Ashland Community and Technical College. KY 67 follows a ridge between the headwaters of multiple creeks; in this area, the route crosses over Culp Creek Road and Pleasant Valley Road; access between the highway and the overpassed roads is via connector roads. The highway descends into the valley of the East Fork of the Little Sandy River and has a four-ramp partial cloverleaf interchange with KY 207 (Argillite Road). KY 67 crosses over Horn Hollow Road, which the route accesses via a connector road, before curving east and then north along Deer Hill Branch to descends from the hills to the floodplain of the Ohio River and enter the city of Wurtland. At the bottom of the hill, the highway intersects US 23 immediately before reaching its northern terminus at KY 3105 (Wurtland Avenue).

The Kentucky Transportation Cabinet (KYTC) classifies all of KY 67 in the state primary system. KY 67 is part of the main National Highway System for its entire length.

== History ==
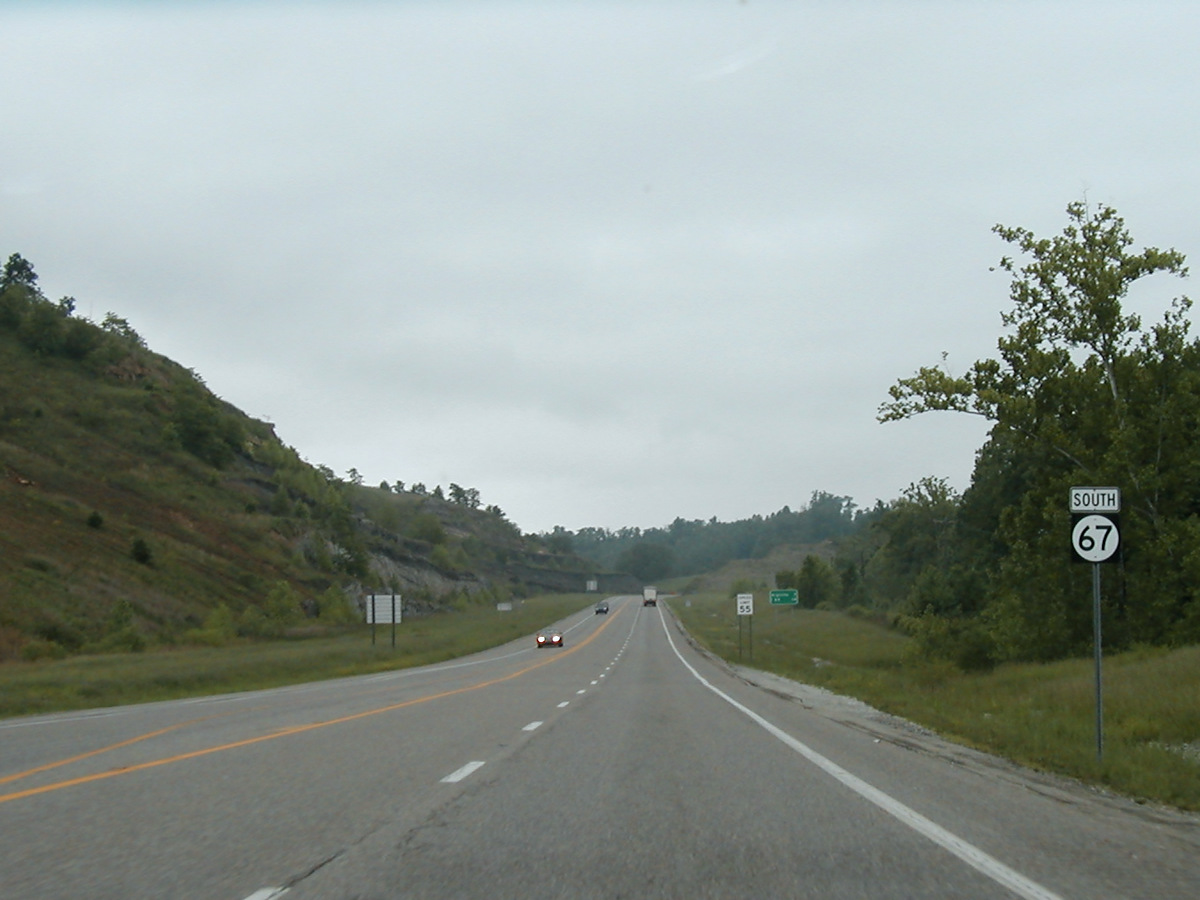
KY 67 southbound

Construction began on phase one in the spring of 1997. The first segment of the Industrial Parkway extended a little over three miles (5 km) to a new industrial park. A trumpet interchange was constructed at milepost 179 on Interstate 64. Along the Parkway are two at-grade intersections for this segment, both of which can be upgraded to full folded-diamond interchanges in the future if traffic counts warrant an upgrade. Phase one included four bridges and cost an estimated $50 million to construct.

In 1998, another five miles (8 km) of the Industrial Parkway was constructed. This extended the Parkway from the end of phase one to Culp Creek Road, and opened in late-2001 to local traffic and officially opened in early 2002. Extending the progression of the highway northward, the third phase opened to traffic in the fall of 2002. Construction began in early-2001 and included a bridge over a small tributary and a folded-diamond interchange with KY 207.

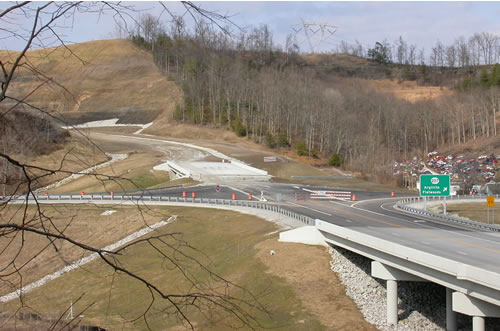
KY 67 at the Kentucky Route 207 interchange.

The final phase extends from the KY 207 interchange to US 23. Construction began on this segment in early-2002 with work being completed by September 2003, a year ahead of schedule. The northern terminus junctions US 23 at a traffic signal and actually continues northward .1 of a mile north to KY 3105 (old US 23). It was given the designation of KY 67 at the dedication ceremony. Since being completed, the Industrial Parkway has saved over 30 minutes of travel between Greenup and Grayson on the curvy and dangerous KY 1. In 2004, the State Primary designation was moved from KY 1 to KY 67. The road also provides access to the EastPark industrial complex near Interstate 64.

== Major intersections ==
County	Location	mi	km	Destinations	Notes
Carter		0.000	0.000	I-64 – Ashland, Lexington	Southern terminus; I-64 exit 179
Greenup		1.022	1.645	Eastpark Drive to Logtown Road – Eastpark Business / Industrial Park, Kentucky Veterans Cemetery North East	Interchange
Boyd	No major junctions				
Greenup		2.557	4.115	Technology Drive / Green Valley Drive – Ashland Community & Technical College Technology Drive Campus, Fivco Area Development District Office	
Greenup		7.491	12.056	To Culp Creek Road	Interchange
Greenup		8.379	13.485	To Pleasant Valley Road	Interchange
Greenup		10.013	16.114	KY 207 – Argillite, Flatwoods, Greenbo Lake State Resort Park	Interchange
Greenup		12.179	19.600	to Horn Hollow Road	Interchange
Greenup	Wurtland	14.145	22.764	US 23 – Greenup, Ashland	
Greenup	Wurtland	14.219	22.883	KY 3105 – Wurtland	Northern terminus
1.000 mi = 1.609 km; 1.000 km = 0.621 mi
