= Eastern Kentucky Railway =

Former American railway

Overview
- Reporting mark: EK
- Locale: northeastern Kentucky
- Dates of operation: 1867–1933

Technical
- Track gauge: 4 ft 8 1/2 in (1,435 mm) standard gauge

The Eastern Kentucky Railway (reporting mark EK) was a railroad in northeastern Kentucky, United States. It served mainly mine traffic, running north from Webbville through Grayson to Riverton (now part of Greenup) on the Ohio River and Chesapeake and Ohio Railway.

== History ==
The Kentucky Improvement Company was chartered in December 1866 and renamed January 1, 1870 to the Eastern Kentucky Railway. The first section, from Riverton south to Argillite, opened in 1867. Further extensions took it to Hunnewell by 1870, Grayson in 1871, Willard by 1874 and Webbville in 1889. At Hitchins, between Grayson and Willard, the line junctioned with the Elizabethtown, Lexington and Big Sandy Railroad, an east–west branch of the Chesapeake and Ohio Railway.

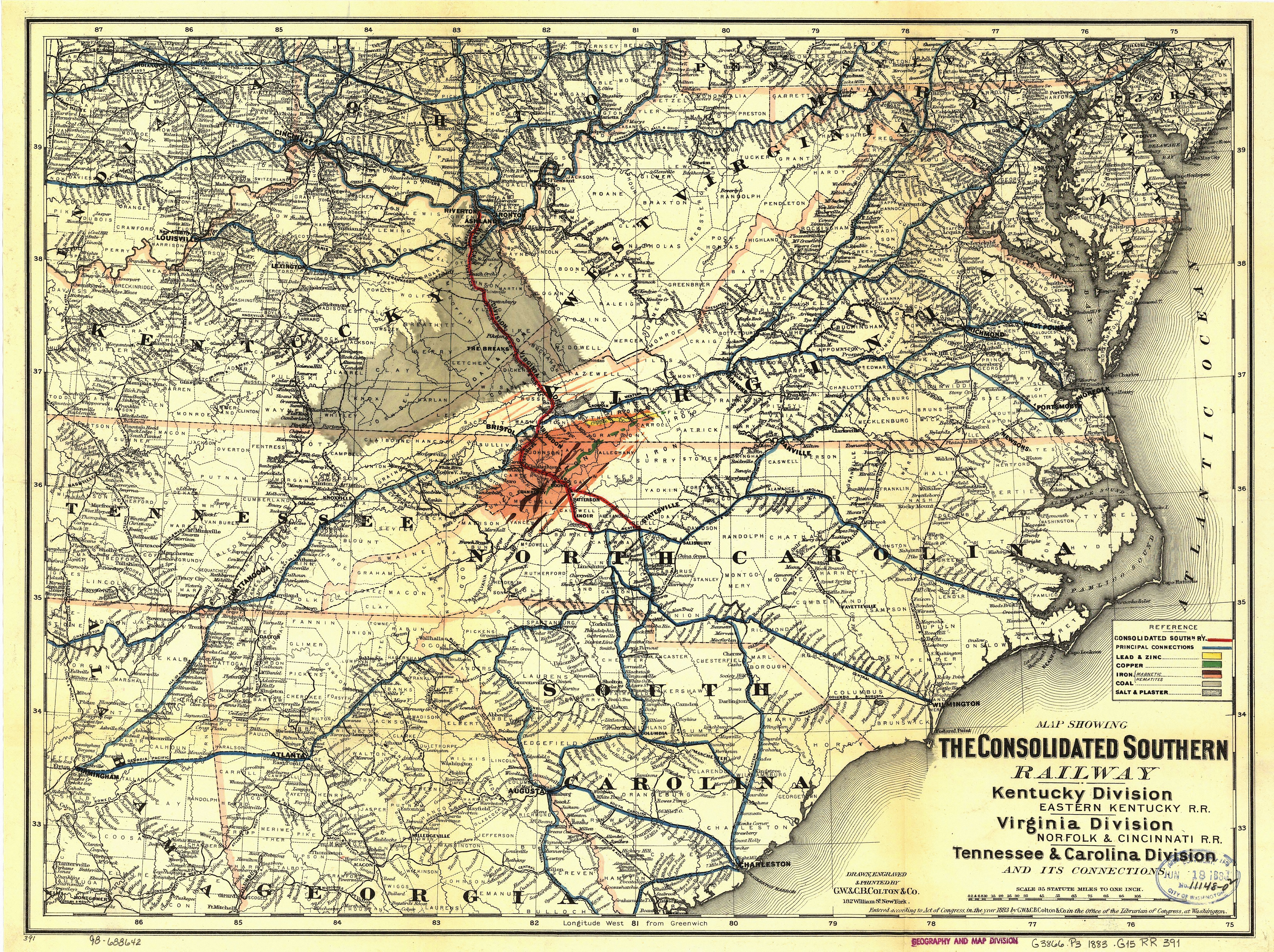
1883 map of the Consolidated Southern Railway (the red line heading north from the orange area)

The Consolidated Southern Railway was a plan in the 1880s to extend the EK south as part of a through line to Hickory and Statesville, North Carolina, also using the never-built Norfolk and Cincinnati Railroad and part of the Chester and Lenoir Railroad.

The EK went bankrupt in 1919, and the part south of Grayson was reorganized in 1928 as the Eastern Kentucky Southern Railway. That company stopped operations in January 1933, and the tracks were removed soon after.

The EK is featured in the children's book A Ride with Huey, the Engineer (1966) by Jesse Stuart. The book "Eastern Kentucky Railway" by Terry L. Baldridge was published in September 2007.

== Tracing the route ==
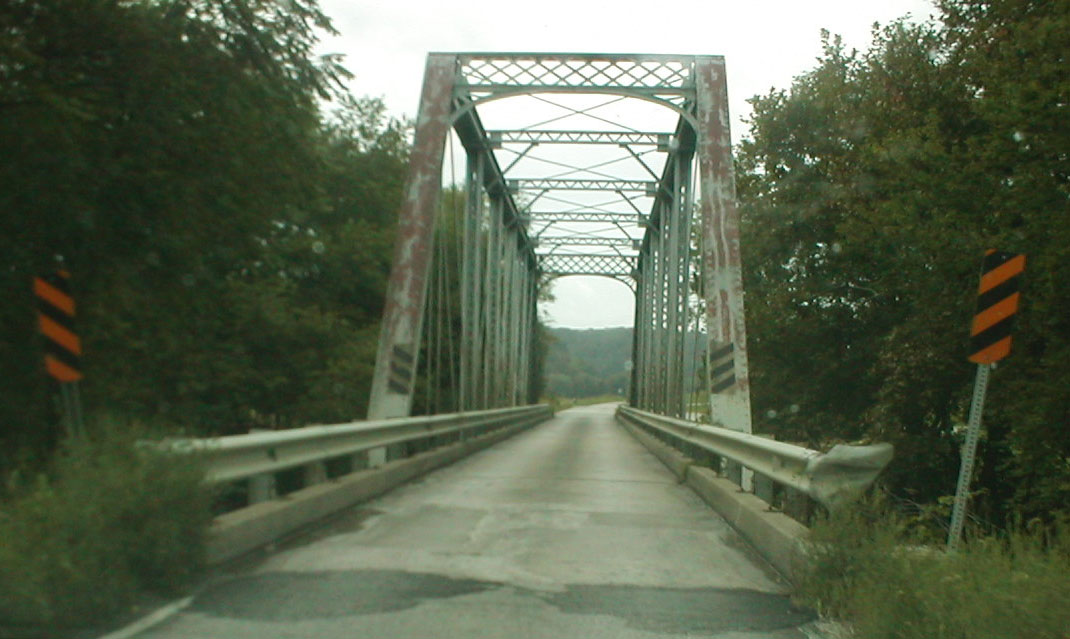
One of the bridges over the Little Sandy River, now used by KY 773

The old alignment parallels KY 1 north of Argillite. From Argillite south to Hunnewell, the alignment except the tunnels has been used for KY 207. KY 3306 mostly follows the path west to Hopewell, and from there south to Grayson it runs along KY 1. From Grayson to Hitchins, the alignment was used for KY 773, including two old truss bridges now used as one-lane road bridges. (Part of the old grade of the Elizabethtown, Lexington and Big Sandy Railroad west of the EK is erroneously named EK Railroad Drive.) Finally, from Hitchins to Webbville, the railroad once again followed KY 1; an old alignment includes another remaining truss bridge, that one with no floor.

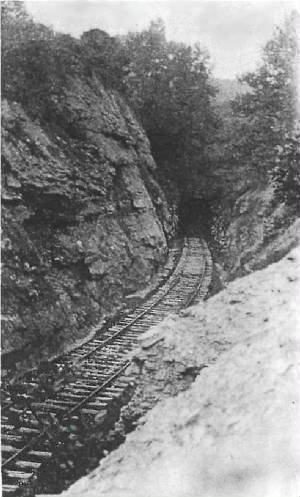
South end of the Argillite Tunnel, ca. 1880s

The railroad had eight tunnels; all but the Argillite Tunnel, south of Argillite, have been flooded. The north end of Argillite Tunnel formerly could be seen from KY 207 where it curves to avoid the hill that the tunnel passes through. But the entrance was buried for safety reasons in 2017.

== Station listing ==
Milepost	Station	Connections and notes
1	Riverton	junction with the Chesapeake and Ohio Railway
	Barney Tunnel	
	McIntire Tunnel	
6	Argillite	
	Argillite Tunnel	
	Callahan Tunnel	
	Laurel	
	Ramey Tunnel	
	Shelton Tunnel	
13	Hunnewell	
	Big Tunnel	
17	Hopewell	
	Hopewell Tunnel	
21	Pactolus	
23	Grayson	
	Vincent's	
28	Hitchins	junction with the Elizabethtown, Lexington and Big Sandy Railroad (C&O)
	Reedville	
34	Willard	
	Bell's Trace	
36	Webbville	
