= Kentucky Route 693 =

State highway in Kentucky, United States

Kentucky Route 693
- KY 693 highlighted in red

Route information
- Maintained by KYTC
- Length: 5.812 mi (9.354 km)

Major junctions
- West end: US 23 in Wurtland
- East end: US 23 in Russell

Location
- Country: United States
- State: Kentucky
- Counties: Greenup

Highway system
- Kentucky State Highway System; Interstate; US; State; Parkways
← KY 692	→ KY 695

Kentucky Route 693 (KY 693) is a 5.812-mile-long (9.354 km) east–west state highway located within Greenup County in the U.S. state of Kentucky. The western terminus of the route is at U.S. Route 23 in Wurtland. The eastern terminus is at US 23 in Russell. KY 693 is also known as Diedrich Boulevard in Russell and Bellefonte Road in Flatwoods.

The road was widened from two lanes to three and five lanes from KY 207 in Flatwoods to its eastern terminus at US 23 in Russell in 2000. This involved the construction of two new bridges spanning White Oak Creek.

A section of KY 693 from the Russell/Flatwoods city line to the intersection of KY 207 (Argillite Road) in Flatwoods is also unofficially known as Billy Ray Cyrus Boulevard. The unofficial designation was made in honor of the Flatwoods native in 2004.

== Route description ==
KY 693 begins at an intersection with US 23 in Wurtland, heading south on two-lane undivided Chinns Branch Road. The road heads through wooded areas with some homes, curving to the southeast. The route becomes Caroline Road and continues southeast, skirting the border between Raceland to the north and Flatwoods to the south. KY 693 continues into Flatwoods and becomes Bellefonte Road, passing through residential areas. The route intersects KY 207 and forms a brief concurrency with that route before KY 207 splits north from KY 693 in the commercial center of town. KY 693 heads past more homes and businesses as a three-lane road with a center left-turn lane and intersects the northern terminus of KY 1458. The road passes more development and crosses into Russell at the junction with the southern terminus of KY 1172, where it becomes Diederich Boulevard. The route heads past businesses and becomes a five-lane road with a center left-turn lane as it comes to the intersection with KY 1093. A short distance later, KY 693 intersects the southern terminus of KY 1725. The route continues east and reaches its eastern terminus at another intersection with US 23.

== Major intersections ==
The entire route is in Greenup County.

Location	mi	km	Destinations	Notes
Wurtland	0.000	0.000	US 23	
Flatwoods	3.099	4.987	KY 207 (Greenbo Boulevard/Reed Street)	Brief concurrency
Flatwoods	3.310	5.327	KY 1458 south (Indian Run Road)	
Russell	3.980	6.405	KY 1172 north (Red Devil Lane)	
Russell	4.934	7.941	KY 1093 (St. Christopher Drive)	
Russell	5.059	8.142	KY 1725 north (Ashland Drive)	
Russell	5.812	9.354	US 23	
1.000 mi = 1.609 km; 1.000 km = 0.621 mi
