= Kentucky Route 750 =

State highway in Kentucky, United States

Kentucky Route 750

Route information
- Maintained by KYTC
- Length: 3.721 mi (5.988 km)

Major junctions
- West end: KY 244 / KY 3105 in Raceland
- East end: US 23 in Russell

Location
- Country: United States
- State: Kentucky
- Counties: Greenup

Highway system
- Kentucky State Highway System; Interstate; US; State; Parkways
← KY 749	→ KY 751

Kentucky Route 750 (KY 750) is a 3.7-mile-long (6.0 km) east–west state highway located within Greenup County.

== Route description ==
The western terminus of the route is at Kentucky Route 3105 (old U.S. Route 23 or US 23) in Raceland, where KY 750 continues north as KY 244. The eastern terminus is at KY 244 in Russell. KY 750 is routed over Pond Run Road and Raceland Avenue in Raceland, Lexington Avenue and Powell Lane in Flatwoods and Seaton Avenue and Kenwood Drive in Russell. It is an alternate to the proposed Tri-State Freeway.

== History ==
KY 750 is mostly a two-lane route that connects Raceland and Russell via Flatwoods. It was widened to three lanes for a little under one mile (1.6 km) in Raceland in 2005. Before reconstruction, it was notorious for its narrow width, where buses and automobiles frequently had to drive on the sidewalk to prevent from colliding with another vehicle. The Russell Viaduct was rebuilt in 2020–21 with a new alignment of KY 244 that truncates KY 750 from its original terminus at US 23.

== Major intersections ==
The entire route is in Greenup County.

Location	mi	km	Destinations	Notes
Raceland	0.000	0.000	KY 244 north (Pond Run Road) / KY 3105 (Greenup Avenue)	
Raceland	0.114	0.183	US 23	
Flatwoods	1.603	2.580	KY 207 (Argillite Road)	
Russell	2.483	3.996	KY 1172 south (Red Devil Lane)	
Russell	3.721	5.988	US 23	
1.000 mi = 1.609 km; 1.000 km = 0.621 mi
