= U.S. Route 23 in Kentucky =

Segment of American highway

U.S. Route 23
- Country Music Highway
- US 23 highlighted in red

Route information
- Maintained by KYTC
- Length: 157.765 mi (253.898 km)

Major junctions
- South end: US 23 at Virginia state line near Jenkins
- US 119 near Jenkins; US 460 / KY 80 in Pikeville; US 119 in Pikeville; KY 80 / KY 302 in Prestonsburg; US 460 / KY 40 in Paintsville; I-64 near Catlettsburg; US 60 in Catlettsburg and Ashland; AA Hwy (KY 10) to US 52 near Greenup
- North end: US 23 at Ohio state line in Portsmouth, OH

Location
- Country: United States
- State: Kentucky
- Counties: Letcher, Pike, Floyd, Johnson, Lawrence, Boyd, Greenup

Highway system
- United States Numbered Highway System; List; Special; Divided; Kentucky State Highway System; Interstate; US; State; Parkways
← KY 22	→ I-24

U.S. Route 23 (US 23) is a 157.765-mile-long (253.898 km) United States Numbered Highway in the state of Kentucky. It travels from the Virginia state line near Jenkins to the Ohio state line west of South Shore via Jenkins, Pikeville, Coal Run Village, Prestonsburg, Paintsville, Louisa, Catlettsburg, Ashland, Russell, Flatwoods, Raceland, Wurtland, Greenup, and South Shore.

== Route description ==
US 23 enters Kentucky at the Virginia state line southeast of Jenkins. After a little over a mile (1.6 km), it intersects US 119 at a partial interchange on the Jenkins city line, and US 119 runs concurrently with US 23. The highway then head in a northeasterly direction, bypassing Jenkins. The two then meet US 460 at another partial interchange along the Levisa Fork in extreme southern Pikeville, and US 460 also joins the concurrency. The highway bypasses Pikeville along the Pikeville Cut-Through before US 119 splits off to the east. US 23/US 460 begins running northeast through Coal Run Village and around both Prestonsburg and Paintsville, where US 460 splits off to the west northwest of Paintsville. US 23 then begins running northeastward, before easing into a northerly direction, bypassing Louisa, after which it begins paralleling the Big Sandy River. The route intersects Interstate 64 next to the Catlettsburg Refinery before entering the town of Catlettsburg, where it begins a concurrency with US 60. The highway continues north before curving to the northwest to enter Ashland, where US 60 splits off. After Ashland, US 23 continues to run northwestward, paralleling the Ohio River and running through or around the towns of Russell, Flatwoods, Raceland, Wurtland, and Greenup. After Greenup, it switches to a more northward direction in parallel with the Ohio River before making a sharp change to the west, after which it enters South Shore. Just west of South Shore, US 23 meets the eastern terminus of the eastern segment of Kentucky Route 8, where it turns north and crosses into Portsmouth, Ohio, via the U.S. Grant Bridge across the Ohio River.

Since 1999, the entire route in Kentucky is a four-lane highway; in some of the larger cities, there are additional traffic lanes present in both directions. In northeastern Kentucky, from the I-64 junction north into Ohio, some sections are four-lanes undivided, with a double yellow line instead of a median. These are the oldest four-lane sections of US 23 in Kentucky which were upgraded in 1950s and 1960s before divided highways became the design standard. They can be found on US 23 in the cities of Catlettsburg, Ashland, and Russell.

== Major intersections ==
County	Location	mi	km	Exit	Destinations	Notes
Pound Gap		0.000	0.000		US 23 south – Pound, Norton	Continuation into Virginia
Pound Gap		0.000	0.000		Virginia–Kentucky line	
Letcher	Jenkins	1.142– 1.285	1.838– 2.068	−	US 119 south – Whitesburg, Harlan	Partial interchange; southern end of US 119 concurrency
Letcher	Jenkins	1.500	2.414		KY 3086 east (C&O Railroad Road)	Western terminus of KY 3086
Letcher	Jenkins	2.460	3.959	−	To KY 805 – Jenkins, Fleming-Neon	Interchange via connector road and northbound entrance ramp
Pike		10.663	17.160		KY 3527 north	Southern terminus of KY 3527
Pike	Dorton	11.655	18.757		KY 805 west	Eastern terminus of KY 805
Pike		15.291	24.608		KY 611 south	Northern terminus of KY 611
Pike		19.111	30.756		KY 1469 west (Penny Highway)	Eastern terminus of KY 1469
Pike		21.187	34.097		KY 2167 south	Northern terminus of KY 2167
Pike		22.503	36.215	15	KY 3174 east	Interchange; future US 460; Corridor Q; access to Elkhorn City, Breaks Interstate Park
Pike	Pikeville	26.104– 26.374	42.010– 42.445	−	US 460 east / KY 80 east (Shelbiana Road) – Elkhorn City, Grundy, VA	Interchange; southern end of US 460 & KY 80 concurrencies
Pike	Pikeville	30.260	48.699		KY 1426 west (Island Creek Road)	Southern end of KY 1426 concurrency
Pike	Pikeville	30.382	48.895		KY 3496 north	At-grade intersection; south end of freeway; southern terminus of KY 3496
Pike	Pikeville	30.897	49.724	23	KY 1426 east (Hambley Boulevard) – Downtown Pikeville	Interchange; northern end of KY 1426 concurrency
Pike	Pikeville	31.665	50.960	24	KY 1384 – Pikeville	Interchange; north end of freeway
Pike	Pikeville	32.144	51.731	−	KY 1460 south	Partial interchange includes northbound entrance ramp
Pike	Pikeville	32.928	52.992		KY 3495 south	Northern terminus of KY 3495
Pike	Pikeville	33.610	54.090		US 119 north / Cassady Boulevard – Meta, Williamson WV	Northern end of US 119 concurrency
Pike		34.697	55.839		KY 3227 east (Stone Coal Road)	Western terminus of KY 3227
Pike		36.783	59.197		KY 2061 north (Cowpen Road)	Southern terminus of KY 2061
Pike		38.922	62.639		KY 3218 east (Senator Kelsey E Friend Boulevard)	Western terminus of KY 3218
Pike		40.125	64.575		KY 1384 east (Hurricane Road)	Western terminus of KY 1384
Floyd	Harold	41.016	66.009		KY 680 west to KY 979 south	Eastern terminus of KY 680
Floyd		42.570	68.510		KY 2557 west	Eastern terminus of KY 2557
Floyd	Banner	49.105	79.027		KY 1426 east – Dana	Western terminus of KY 1426
Floyd	Allen	50.685	81.570		KY 1428 – Allen, Martin	
Floyd	Watergap	52.922	85.170	−	KY 80 west / KY 302 north – Martin, Hazard	Interchange; northern end of KY 80 concurrency; southern terminus of KY 302
Floyd		53.632	86.312		KY 3384 north	Southern terminus of KY 3384
Floyd	Prestonsburg	55.847	89.877	−	KY 114 – Prestonsburg, Lexington	Interchange; future eastern terminus of Mountain Parkway
Floyd		57.636	92.756		KY 1427 west (Abbott Creek Road)	Eastern terminus of KY 1427
Floyd		57.952	93.265		KY 1428 south (University Drive)	Northern terminus of KY 1428
Floyd		60.218	96.911		KY 1100 (Little Paint Road)	
Floyd		60.592	97.513		KY 3 north (Bays Branch Road) to KY 1100	Southern terminus of KY 3
Johnson		62.269	100.212		KY 1100 south	Northern terminus of KY 1100
Johnson	Paintsville	64.119	103.190		KY 1750 south	Northern terminus of KY 1750
Johnson	Paintsville	64.540	103.867		KY 1428 north	Southern terminus of KY 1428
Johnson	Paintsville	66.169	106.489	−	KY 825	Partial interchange includes northbound entrance ramp
Johnson	Paintsville	68.858	110.816	−	US 460 west / KY 40 – Salyersville, Paintsville	Interchange; northern end of US 460 concurrency; northbound exit and southbound entrance
Johnson	Paintsville	69.075	111.165	−	KY 40 to US 460 west – Paintsville, Salyersville	Interchange; southbound exit and northbound entrance
Johnson		70.099	112.813		KY 321 south	Northern terminus of KY 321
Johnson		71.117	114.452		KY 201 north	Southern terminus of KY 201
Johnson	Nippa	73.326	118.007		KY 1559 west	Eastern terminus of KY 1559
Johnson		73.789	118.752		KY 993 south	Northern terminus of KY 993
Johnson		78.269	125.962		KY 3224 south (Wiley Branch Spur)	Northern terminus of KY 3224
Lawrence		83.908	135.037		KY 645 east	Western terminus of KY 645
Lawrence		84.989	136.777		KY 1760 north	Southern terminus of KY 1760
Lawrence		85.508	137.612		KY 581 south	Northern terminus of KY 581
Lawrence		89.740	144.423		KY 2038 east (McClure Branch Road)	Western terminus of KY 2038
Lawrence		93.657	150.726		KY 2565 north	Southern terminus of KY 2565
Lawrence		93.933	151.171		KY 3395 west (Isaac Branch Road)	Eastern terminus of KY 3395
Lawrence		95.965	154.441		KY 32 Connector south to KY 32	Northern terminus of KY 32 Connector
Lawrence		97.407	156.761		KY 3	
Lawrence		100.627	161.943		KY 3398 west (Fuller Branch Road)	Eastern terminus of KY 3398
Lawrence		107.534	173.059		KY 707 south	Northern terminus of KY 707
Boyd		110.987	178.616		KY 752 (Durbin Road)	
Boyd		114.098	183.623		KY 757 (Whites Creek Road)	
Boyd		115.043	185.144		KY 2842 east	Western terminus of KY 2842
Boyd		118.521	190.741		KY 3 south	Northern terminus of KY 3
Boyd		118.593– 118.733	190.857– 191.082		I-64 – Huntington, Lexington	I-64 exit 191
Boyd		119.009	191.526		KY 538 west (Lake Bonita Road)	Eastern terminus of KY 538
Boyd	Catlettsburg	120.393	193.754		KY 3294 (36th Street)	
Boyd	Catlettsburg	120.473	193.882		US 60 east (35th Street)	Southern end of US 60 concurrency
Boyd	Catlettsburg	121.533	195.588		KY 2535 east (23rd Street)	Western terminus of KY 2535
Boyd	Catlettsburg	121.653	195.782		KY 168 north	Southern terminus of KY 168
Boyd	Catlettsburg	122.206	196.671		KY 3294 west (Center Street)	Eastern terminus of KY 3294
Boyd	Ashland	125.019	201.199		US 23 Bus. north	Southern terminus of US 23 Bus.; northbound outbound access and southbound inbound access only
Boyd	Ashland	126.8	204.1		US 60 west / US 23 Truck (11th Street)	One-way street, inbound access only from US 60
Boyd	Ashland	126.863	204.166		US 60 west (10th Street) to US 52	One-way street, outbound access only to US 60 east; northern end of US 60 concurrency
Boyd	Ashland	127.050	204.467		US 23 Bus. south	Northern terminus of US 23 Bus.; southbound outbound access and northbound inbound access only
Boyd	Ashland			−	West Mall Entrance	Interchange; to Ashland Town Center; northbound exit only
Boyd	Ashland	128.411	206.657		KY 168 south (Hoods Creek Pike) / Russell Road	Northern terminus of KY 168
Boyd	Westwood	128.806	207.293		KY 5 south (Bellefonte Princess Road)	Northern terminus of KY 5
Greenup	Russell	129.299	208.087		KY 693 west (Diederich Boulevard)	Eastern terminus of KY 693
Greenup	Russell	130.224	209.575		KY 1725 south (Ashland Drive)	Northern terminus of KY 1725
Greenup	Russell	131.020	210.856		KY 244 west (Belfont Street) / Oakley C. Collins Bridge Road	Eastern terminus of KY 224; southern terminus of the Oakley C. Collins Bridge (Ironton-Russell Bridge)
Greenup	Russell	131.069	210.935		KY 750 west (Kenwood Drive)	Eastern terminus of KY 750
Greenup	Russell	131.652	211.873		KY 2543 east (Ferry Street)	Western terminus of KY 2543
Greenup	Flatwoods	132.143	212.664		KY 207 south (Argillite Road)	Northern terminus of KY 207
Greenup	Raceland	133.295	214.518		KY 3105 west (Winters Drive) / Winters Drive	Eastern terminus of KY 3105
Greenup	Raceland	133.509	214.862		KY 750 (Pond Run Road)	
Greenup		135.558	218.159		KY 693 west (Chinns Bridge Road) / Chinns Branch Road	
Greenup	Wurtland	136.581	219.806		KY 503 (Uhlens Branch Road)	
Greenup	Wurtland	136.950	220.400		KY 67 (Industrial Parkway) to I-64	
Greenup	Wurtland	137.061	220.578		KY 3105 east (Wurtland Avenue)	Western terminus of KY 3105
Greenup	Greenup	138.638	223.116		KY 410 north (Main Street)	Southern terminus of KY 410
Greenup	Greenup	139.253	224.106		KY 1 south (Kentucky Road) / KY 2541 north (Walnut Street)	Northern terminus of KY 1; southern terminus of KY 2541
Greenup	Greenup	140.179	225.596		KY 2 (Washington Street)	
Greenup	Greenup	140.738	226.496		KY 2541 south	Northern terminus of KY 2541
Greenup		140.898	226.753		KY 3307 south (Whetstone Road)	Northern terminus of KY 3307
Greenup		141.609	227.898		KY 827 west (Coal Branch Road)	Eastern terminus of KY 827
Greenup	Lloyd	143.050	230.217		KY 3116 north (Ohio River Road)	Southern terminus of KY 3116
Greenup		145.510	234.176		AA Hwy (KY 10) to US 52 – Maysville, Alexandria, Vanceburg, Portsmouth Oh.	Access road to the Jesse Stuart Memorial Bridge
Greenup		146.524	235.808		KY 3116 south (Ohio River Road)	Northern terminus of KY 3116
Greenup		148.011	238.201		KY 1043 north (Linneman Lane)	Southern terminus of KY 1043
Greenup		152.544	245.496		KY 3117 west	Eastern terminus of KY 3117
Greenup		153.038	246.291		KY 2542 north (Johnson Lane)	Southern terminus of KY 2542
Greenup		153.448	246.951		KY 3117 east	Western terminus of KY 3117
Greenup		153.864	247.620		KY 1043 south	Northern terminus of KY 1043
Greenup	South Shore	155.726	250.617		KY 1082 west (KZ Ratliff Lane)	Eastern terminus of KY 1082
Greenup	South Shore	155.942	250.964		KY 7 (Main Street)	
Greenup		157.765	253.898		US 23 Truck north / KY 8 west to US 52 – Vanceburg	Southern terminus of US 23 Truck; eastern terminus of KY 8; southern terminus of the U.S. Grant Bridge
Ohio River		157.765	253.898		U.S. Grant Bridge; Kentucky–Ohio line	
Ohio River		157.765	253.898		US 23 north (Chillicothe Street)	Continuation into Ohio
1.000 mi = 1.609 km; 1.000 km = 0.621 mi: Concurrency terminus; Incomplete access

== See also ==
- Special routes of U.S. Route 23

U.S. Route 23
Previous state: Virginia	Kentucky	Next state: Ohio
