= Webbville, Kentucky =

Unincorporated community in Kentucky, United States

- Unincorporated community
- Location within Kentucky Location within the United States
- Coordinates: 38°10′46″N 82°52′17″W
- Country: United States
- State: Kentucky
- County: Lawrence
- Elevation: 653 ft (199 m)
- Time zone: UTC-5 (Eastern (EST))
  - Summer (DST): UTC-4 (EDT)
- ZIP code: 41180
- Area code: 606
- GNIS feature ID: 506340

Webbville is an unincorporated community in Lawrence County, Kentucky, United States. The community is located at the intersection of Kentucky Route 1 and Kentucky Route 201 11.4 miles (18.3 km) south of Grayson. Webbville had a post office from January 11, 1867, until March 23, 2013; it still has its own ZIP code, 41180. The community contains one small business: Perkins Sawmill.

Webbville was the last stop of the Eastern Kentucky Railway which ran until the early 1930s.
