= Argillite, Kentucky =

Unincorporated community in Kentucky, United States

- Unincorporated community
- Location within Kentucky
- Coordinates: 38.489237°N 82.828674°W
- Country: United States
- State: Kentucky
- County: Greenup
- Elevation: 541 ft (165 m)
- Time zone: UTC-5 (Eastern (EST))
  - Summer (DST): UTC-4 (EDT)
- ZIP code: 41121
- Area code: 606
- GNIS feature ID: 507409

Argillite is an unincorporated community on the Little Sandy River in Greenup County, Kentucky, United States. It sits at the southern end of the confluence of Kentucky Routes 1 and 207. The name refers to argillite, a type of stone, related to shale.

Argillite was a stop along the Eastern Kentucky Railway between the Simonton and Laurel stops. Argillite's ZIP Code is 41121.

== Notable person ==
- Jeremy Bates, heavyweight boxer
