= Kentucky Route 2 =

State highway in Kentucky

Kentucky Route 2
- KY 2 highlighted in red

Route information
- Maintained by KYTC
- Length: 36.887 mi (59.364 km)

Major junctions
- West end: US 60 in Olive Hill
- I-64 near Olive Hill; AA Hwy (KY 9) near Kehoe; US 23 in Greenup
- East end: KY 2541 in Greenup

Location
- Country: United States
- State: Kentucky
- Counties: Carter, Greenup

Highway system
- Kentucky State Highway System; Interstate; US; State; Parkways
← KY 1	→ KY 3

Kentucky Route 2 is an east–west state highway extending 36.887 miles (59.361 km) across northeast Kentucky. The western terminus of the route is at U.S. Route 60 (US 60) in Olive Hill, Carter County. The eastern terminus is at Kentucky Route 2541 in Greenup, Greenup County a short distance east of US 23.

== Route description ==
Starting at US 60 in Olive Hill, KY 2 meanders northwestward. As the route meets I-64 at a diamond interchange and KY 59 after that, it then meanders northeastward. On its way, it meets KY 1704, then KY 1025, then Wesleyville, then KY 182 (which forms a brief concurrency with KY 2), KY 396, and then KY 474 in Carter. East of Carter, it then begins to run concurrently with KY 7. Going further northeast, they then meet KY 9 (AA Highway), then KY 1773, and then KY 784. After that, both routes split off in a different direction, ending the concurrency. For KY 2, it then intersects KY 1459, KY 3307, KY 2433, and US 23. Going further, the route ends at KY 2541 in Greenup.

== Major intersections ==
County	Location	mi	km	Destinations	Notes
Carter	Olive Hill	0.00	0.00	US 60	Western terminus
Carter		2.944	4.738	I-64	Exit 158
Carter		3.093	4.978	KY 59	Southern terminus of KY 59
Carter		4.218	6.788	KY 1704	Western terminus of KY 1704
Carter		6.412	10.319	KY 1025	Northern terminus of KY 1025
Carter		9.703	15.615	KY 182 (Carter Caves Road)	Western end of KY 182 overlap
Carter		10.134	16.309	KY 182 (Carter Caves Road)	Eastern end of KY 182 overlap
Carter		11.217	18.052	KY 396	Eastern terminus of KY 396
Carter	Carter	12.952	20.844	KY 474	Eastern terminus of KY 474
Carter	Gesling	14.907	23.990	KY 7	Western end of KY 7 overlap
Carter		18.158	29.222	AA Hwy (KY 9)	
Carter		18.587	29.913	KY 1773	Eastern terminus of 1773
Greenup	Kehoe	19.628	31.588	KY 784 (Three Prong Road)	
Greenup		25.643	41.268	KY 7	Eastern end of KY 7 overlap
Greenup		31.731	51.066	KY 1459 (Low Gap Road)	Northern terminus of KY 1459
Greenup		32.578	52.429	KY 3307	Southern terminus of KY 3307
Greenup		34.879	56.132	KY 2433 (West Howl Road)	Northern terminus of KY 2433
Greenup	Greenup	36.614	58.925	US 23	
Greenup	Greenup	36.887	59.364	KY 2541 (Main Street)	Eastern terminus
1.000 mi = 1.609 km; 1.000 km = 0.621 mi: Concurrency terminus
