= Interstate 64 in Kentucky =

Interstate Highway in Kentucky, US

Interstate 64
- I-64 highlighted in red

Route information
- Maintained by KYTC
- Length: 191 mi (307 km)
- Existed: 1956–present
- NHS: Entire route

Major junctions
- West end: I-64 / US 150 at the Indiana state line in Louisville
- I-264 in Louisville; I-65 / I-71 in Louisville; US 42 / US 60 in Louisville; I-264 in Louisville; I-265 / KY 841 in Middletown; I-75 in Lexington; US 27 / US 68 in Lexington; Mountain Parkway in Winchester; US 23 near Catlettsburg
- East end: I-64 at the West Virginia state line in Kenova, WV

Location
- Country: United States
- State: Kentucky
- Counties: Jefferson, Shelby, Franklin, Woodford, Scott, Fayette, Clark, Montgomery, Bath, Rowan, Carter, Boyd

Highway system
- Interstate Highway System; Main; Auxiliary; Suffixed; Business; Future; Kentucky State Highway System; Interstate; US; State; Parkways
← KY 63	→ KY 64

Interstate 64 (I-64) in the US state of Kentucky travels for 191 miles (307 km), passing by the major towns and cities of Louisville, Frankfort, Lexington, and Ashland. It has several major junctions with other Interstates, including I-65, I-71, I-264, and I-265 in Louisville and I-75 in Lexington.

The portion of I-64 in Kentucky is host to two "exceptionally significant" structures indicated by the Federal Highway Administration (FHWA). One is the Cochran Hill Tunnel, a twin tube at Cherokee Park in Louisville built in 1974, and the other is a 1960s-era modern-styled rest area near Winchester.

In Downtown Louisville, I-64 passes under a public plaza called the Riverfront Plaza/Belvedere, one of the only structures in the state built on top of an Interstate.

Between the Indiana state line and Lexington, I-64 is named the Daniel Boone Expressway.

The entire length of I-64 in Kentucky has been designated as a portion of the Purple Heart Trail.

== Route description ==
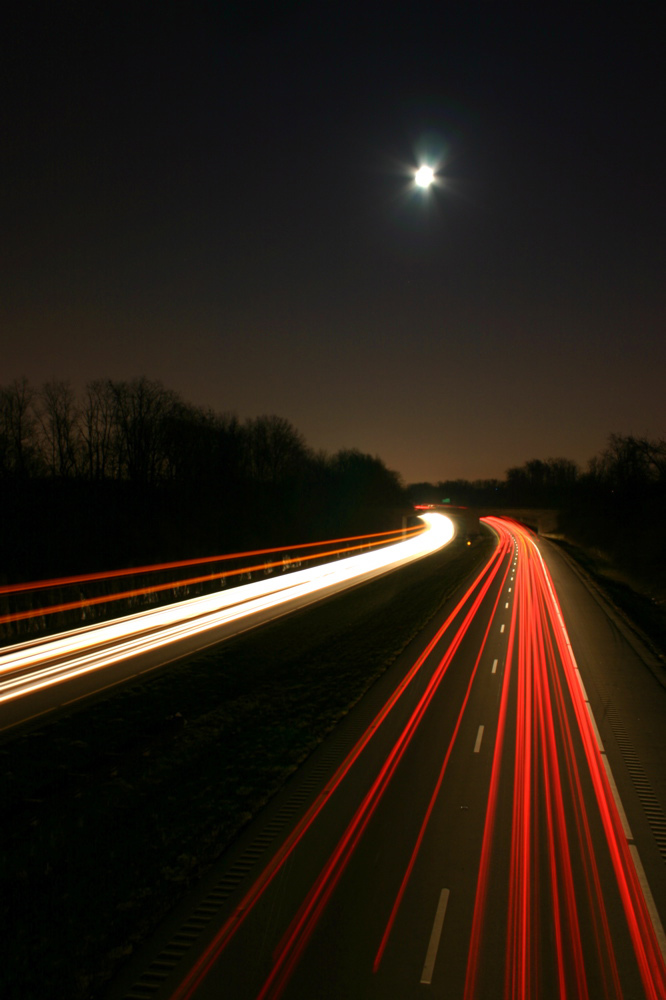
Streaking lights on I-64 as seen from the horse/bike bridge at Seneca Park in Louisville

Eastwardly, I-64 enters Kentucky at Louisville, paralleling the Ohio River as the Riverfront Expressway. It intersects with several downtown interchanges before coming to the Kennedy Interchange, where it intersects I-65 and I-71 in a tangle of ramps often referred to as the "Spaghetti Junction".

East of downtown Louisville, I-64 passes through the Cochran Hill Tunnel beneath Cherokee Park before continuing through the suburban communities of Middletown and Shelbyville in Shelby County. The highway then continues toward the state capital, Frankfort, passing through rolling terrain typical of north-central Kentucky.

Continuing eastward, I-64 passes through Midway, Lexington, Winchester, Mount Sterling, Owingsville, and Morehead, before leaving the state near Ashland at Catlettsburg. Near Lexington, it overlaps I-75 as it makes an arc around the northeast of the city's urban core, with the exit numbers for I-75 used for the concurrent portion. The two Interstates separate a few miles east of downtown Lexington.

== History ==
The Cochran Hill Tunnel in Louisville, also known as the Cherokee Park Tunnel, underwent restoration in 2001, which involved the reconstruction of the concrete pavement, the installation of new tiles, and the improvement of lighting. Later, the lights in the tunnel were replaced after multiple lights were found to be faulty. The tunnels, which opened in 1974, are one of three sites in Kentucky deemed "exceptionally significant" by the FHWA. The designation meant that it will be very difficult for the stretch of Interstate running through Cherokee Park ever to be widened.

Construction began on a Kentucky Route 180 (KY 180) interchange improvement project in the summer of 2006. The $34-million (equivalent to $49.8 million in 2025) project entailed the rebuilding of six bridges, the widening of KY 180 to four lanes in the vicinity of the interchange, and the conversion of the ramps into a diamond interchange. The project was finished in the autumn of 2008.

In March 2007, Governor Ernie Fletcher signed Senate Bill 83, which allowed for an increase in speed limits on rural Interstates and parkways. Speed limits on rural sections of I-64 were increased from 65 to 70 mph (105 to 113 km/h), following an engineering study by the Kentucky Transportation Cabinet. New signage was installed in July

On June 7, 2007, I-64 between the junction of I-264 and I-65 and I-71 in Downtown Louisville was closed to through traffic. The section of highway featured three lanes of traffic in each direction on an elevated viaduct paralleling the Ohio River, carrying 90,000 vehicles per day. The closure was part of a $50-million (equivalent to $74.7 million in 2025) refurbishment project that involved replacing 132 expansion joints and repaving more than four miles (6.4 km) of Interstate and interchanges. The work was completed in two phases, starting with the entire project area being closed on three weekends in June, followed by a section of highway closed from 3rd to 22nd streets in early July to early August. However, the Interstate was not finished because of the section between Frankfort and Lexington. The state could not attain the right-of-way here because of very famous horse parks northwest of Lexington. After a couple of tries to get the right-of-way, the state was able to get the right-of-way and began construction on this segment. It was the last segment of I-64 to be completed in Kentucky.

=== 8664 ===
Controversially, I-64 runs through Louisville Waterfront Park, a key part of the revitalization of Downtown Louisville, and portions of the park exist under it. 8664, a grassroots campaign with popular support but little apparent political momentum, aimed to reroute and remove I-64 to enhance Louisville's waterfront. I-64 through Louisville would be resigned as I-364. I-64 was to be widened over the park as a part of the Ohio River Bridges Project. But plans to widen the freeway over the park were abandoned to reduce costs of the Ohio River Bridges Project.

== Exit list ==
County	Location	mi	km	Exit	Destinations	Notes
Ohio River		0.0	0.0		I-64 west / US 150 west	Continuation into Indiana
Ohio River		0.0	0.0	Sherman Minton Bridge		
Jefferson	Louisville	0.9	1.4	1	I-264 east – Shively	Western terminus and exits 0B-A on I-264
Jefferson	Louisville	2.7	4.3	3	US 150 east (22nd Street)	Eastern end of US 150 concurrency
Jefferson	Louisville	3.9	6.3	4	9th Street/ Roy Wilkins Avenue – Downtown	
Jefferson	Louisville	4.5	7.2	5B	3rd Street / River Road – Downtown	Westbound exit and eastbound entrance
Jefferson	Louisville	5.2	8.4	5A	I-65 south – Nashville	Signed as exits 5A (south) and 5B (north) eastbound
Jefferson	Louisville	5.2	8.4	5A	I-65 Toll north (Abraham Lincoln Bridge) – Indianapolis	Signed as exits 5A (south) and 5B (north) eastbound
Jefferson	Louisville	5.9	9.5	6	I-71 north – Cincinnati	Eastbound access only; I-71 exit 1B northbound to I-64 eastbound, 1A southbound to 64 westbound; southern terminus of I-71
Jefferson	Louisville	6.4	10.3	7	US 42 / US 60 (Mellwood Avenue / Story Avenue)	
Jefferson	Louisville	7.8	12.6	8	Grinstead Drive	Access to Lexington Road (US 60 Alt.) to Southern and Louisville Seminaries
Jefferson	Louisville	8.1	13.0	Cochran Hill Tunnel		
Jefferson	Louisville	10.3	16.6	10	Cannons Lane	
Jefferson	Louisville	12.3	19.8	12	I-264 (Watterson Expressway) – Louisville International Airport	Signed as exits 12A (west) and 12B (east) eastbound; I-264 exit 19
Jefferson	Louisville	14.9	24.0	15	KY 1747 (Hurstbourne Parkway) – Jeffersontown, Middletown, Industrial Park	Signed as exits 15A (south), 15B (south-local access), and 15C (north) eastbound
Jefferson	Jeffersontown	17.1	27.5	17	Blankenbaker Parkway (KY 913)	No signage for KY 913
Jefferson	Jeffersontown	18.9	30.4	19	I-265 (Gene Snyder Freeway)	Signed westbound as exits 19A (south) and 19B (north); I-265 exit 15
Shelby	Simpsonville	27.5	44.3	28	KY 1848 – Simpsonville	
Shelby	Shelbyville	31.8	51.2	32	KY 55 – Taylorsville, Shelbyville	
Shelby	Shelbyville	35.1	56.5	35	KY 53 – Shelbyville	
Shelby		43.3	69.7	43	KY 395 – Waddy, Peytona	
Franklin	Frankfort	47.7	76.8	48	KY 151 to US 127 south – Lawrenceburg, Graefenburg	
Franklin	Frankfort	48.8	78.5	49	US 460 east – Frankfort	
Franklin	Frankfort	53.0	85.3	53	US 127 – Lawrenceburg, Frankfort	Signed as exits 53A (south) and 53B (north)
Franklin	Jett	57.8	93.0	58	US 60 – Versailles, Frankfort	
Woodford	Midway	65.2	104.9	65	KY 341 to US 62 west – Versailles, Midway	
Scott		68.8	110.7	69	US 62 east – Georgetown	Ramps provide access to both eastbound and westbound US 62
Fayette	Lexington	74.7	120.2	75	I-75 north – Georgetown, Cincinnati	Western terminus of concurrency with I-75, exit 118 southbound, uses I-75 exit numbers and mile markers
Fayette	Lexington	76.9	123.8	115	KY 922 (Newtown Pike) to Bluegrass Parkway – Lexington, Blue Grass Airport	
Fayette	Lexington	79.2	127.5	113	US 27 / US 68 (Broadway) – Lexington, Paris	
Fayette	Lexington	81.3	130.8	81	I-75 south – Richmond, Knoxville	Eastern end of I-75 concurrency; exit 111 northbound
Fayette	Lexington	87.3	140.5	87	KY 859 – Bluegrass Station	
Clark	Winchester	94.0	151.3	94	KY 1958 to KY 627 / Van Meter Road – Winchester	
Clark	Winchester	96.1	154.7	96	KY 627 – Winchester, Paris	Signed as exits 96A (south) and 96B (north) westbound
Clark		97.5	156.9	98	Mountain Parkway east – Campton	Eastbound exit and westbound entrance; westbound exit is via a U-turn at exit 96
Clark		101.6	163.5	101	US 60	
Montgomery	Mount Sterling	109.6	176.4	110	US 460 / KY 11 – Flemingsburg, Mount Sterling, Paris	
Montgomery	Mount Sterling	112.3	180.7	113	US 60 – Mount Sterling	
Bath	Owingsville	121.1	194.9	121	KY 36 – Owingsville, Frenchburg	
Bath	Owingsville	122.9	197.8	123	US 60 – Owingsville, Salt Lick	
Rowan		132.8	213.7	133	KY 801 – Sharkey, Farmers	
Rowan	Morehead	137.1	220.6	137	KY 32 – Flemingsburg, Morehead	
Carter		156.0	251.1	156	KY 2 to KY 59 – Olive Hill, Vanceburg	
Carter	Olive Hill	161.3	259.6	161	US 60 – Olive Hill	
Carter	Grayson	171.4	275.8	172	KY 1 / KY 7 to AA Hwy (KY 9) – Maysville, Grayson	
Carter		178.3	286.9	179	KY 67 north (Industrial Parkway) – Greenup, Wurtland	
Boyd	Coalton	181.2	291.6	181	US 60	
Boyd	Ashland	185.2	298.1	185	KY 180 to US 60 – Cannonsburg, Ashland	
Boyd		190.5	306.6	191	US 23 – Ashland, Louisa	
Boyd		191.0	307.4		I-64 east – Huntington	Continuation into West Virginia
1.000 mi = 1.609 km; 1.000 km = 0.621 mi: Concurrency terminus; Incomplete access; Unopened

== Related route ==
Interstate 264
- Location: Louisville–Glenview Manor

I-264 is an inner loop route in the Louisville metropolitan area. It was created as a part of US 60 in 1949, and signed under its current designation in 1956. It is signed as the Georgia Davis Powers Shawnee Expressway between its western terminus at I-64 in Shawnee and U.S. Route 31W (US 31W)/US 60 (Dixie Highway) in Shively and as the Watterson Expressway from US 31W/US 60 to its northeastern terminus at I-71 in Glenview Manor. Along the way, it provides access to Louisville International Airport at its junction with I-65.

== See also ==
- List of roads in Louisville, Kentucky

Interstate 64
Previous state: Indiana	Kentucky	Next state: West Virginia
