= Wurtland Union Church =

Historic church in Kentucky, United States

- U.S. National Register of Historic Places
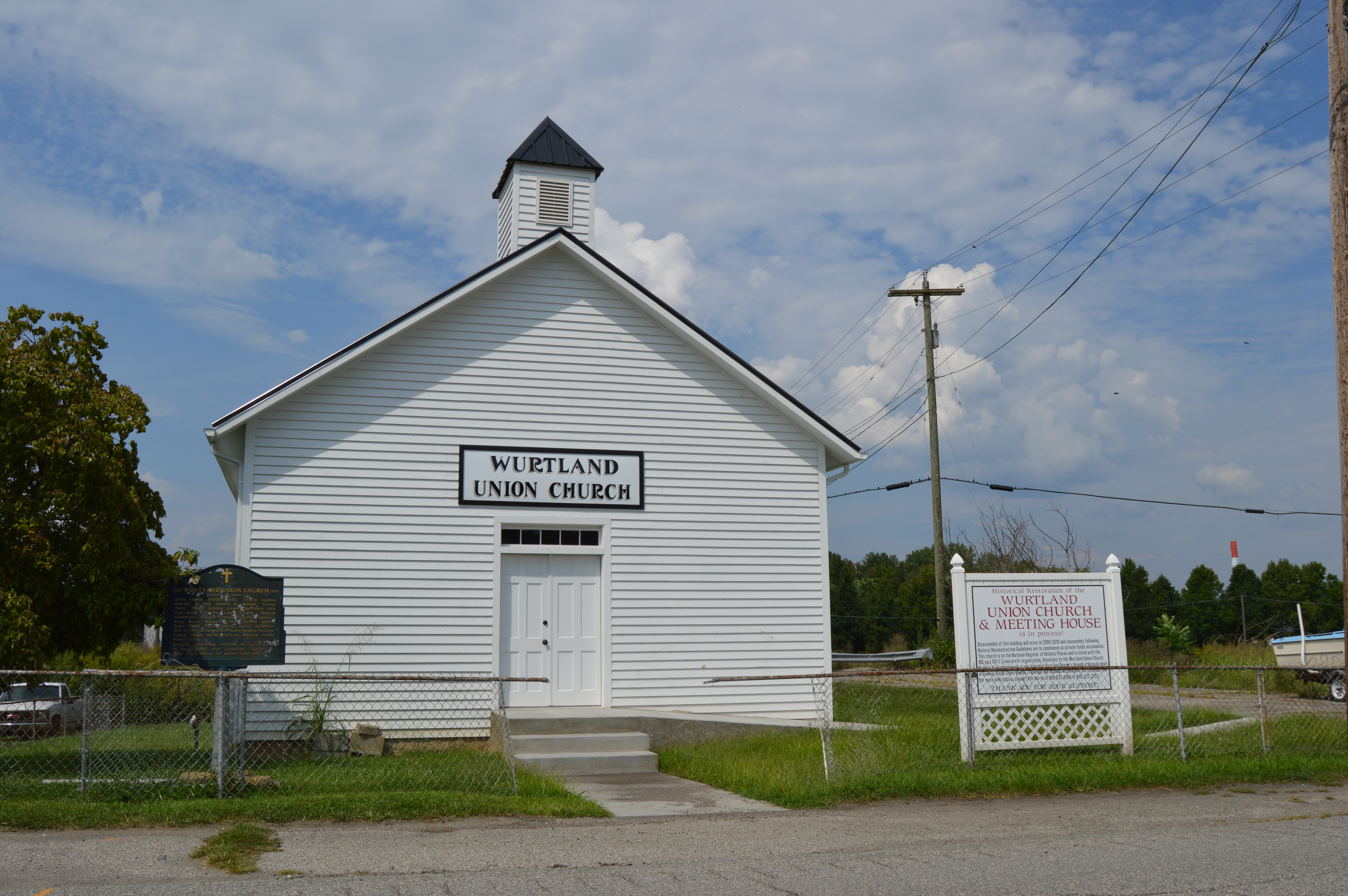
- Front of the church in 2014

- Location within Kentucky Location within the United States
- Location: 325 Wurtland Ave., Wurtland, Kentucky
- Coordinates: 38.55059°N 82.78109°W
- Area: less than one acre
- Built: 1921
- Architectural style: gable-front
- NRHP reference No.: 08001119
- Added to NRHP: December 4, 2008

The Wurtland Union Church and Meeting House is a historic church at 325 Wurtland Avenue in Wurtland, Kentucky. It was built in 1921 and added to the National Register of Historic Places in 2008 as Wurtland Union Church.

The church was disassembled in 2009 and was in process of restoration in 2012.
