= Hunnewell, Kentucky =

Unincorporated community in Kentucky, United States

Coordinates: 38°24′48″N 82°50′44″W

Hunnewell is an unincorporated community in Greenup County, Kentucky, United States.

== History ==
Hunnewell was a stop along the Eastern Kentucky Railway and was named after one of the railways founders H.H. Hunnewell. Prior to the railway, the area was the site of the Greenup Furnace community, which was renamed Hunnewell Furnace. A post office called Hunnewell was established in 1874, and remained in operation until it was discontinued in 1950. In 1922, Hunnewell was almost completely destroyed by the largest tornado Kentucky has ever seen.
