= Hitchins, Kentucky =

Unincorporated community in Kentucky, United States

- Unincorporated community
- Location within Kentucky Location within the United States
- Coordinates: 38°16′51″N 82°55′13″W
- Country: United States
- State: Kentucky
- County: Carter
- Elevation: 600 ft (180 m)
- Time zone: UTC-5 (Eastern (EST))
  - Summer (DST): UTC-4 (EDT)
- ZIP code: 41146
- Area code: 606
- GNIS feature ID: 494312

Hitchins is an unincorporated community in Carter County, Kentucky, United States. The community is located at the intersection of Kentucky Route 1 and Kentucky Route 773, 3.9 miles (6.3 km) south-southeast of Grayson. Hitchins has a post office with ZIP code 41146.
