= EastPark, Kentucky =

Industrial park in Kentucky, United States

Coordinates: 38°24′15″N 82°47′24″W

EastPark is a 1000-acre (4 km^{2}) industrial park located in the state of Kentucky, United States, at the junction of Boyd, Greenup, and Carter counties, although most of the park resides in Greenup County. The park is operated by the Northeast Kentucky Regional Industrial Park Authority. The site of the park was donated to the state of Kentucky by Addington Enterprises from reclaimed land that had once been used as a strip mine. The state of Kentucky used the donated land to build the park and a two-lane highway, now known as the Industrial Parkway (Kentucky Route 67) This proved to be beneficial to both Addington and the state, as the land was not able to be developed without the road and it provided a way to connect US 23 in Greenup County to Interstate 64. The park has a convenient location, as it is located where Interstate 64 and KY 67 intersect. EastPark is also connected to a port on the Ohio River in Wurtland, Kentucky, via KY 67.

EastPark is located in the Huntington-Ashland, WV-KY-OH, Metropolitan Statistical Area (MSA). As of the 2000 census, the MSA had a population of 288,649.

== Companies located at EastPark ==
EastPark is divided into two sections. Businesses located off of EastPark Drive include:

- AT&T Mobility
- Cintas
- Indiana/Kentucky/Ohio Regional Council of Carpenters Administration Center, Union Hall and Training Center
- KOA Kampground Ashland/Huntington West
- Kentucky Veterans Cemetery Northeast (Kentucky Department of Veteran's Affairs)

Businesses located off Technology Drive & Green Valley Drive include:

- Ashland Community and Technical College - Technology Drive Campus
- FIVCO Area Development District Central Office
- General Sales Company
- H.T. Hackney Company
- NECCO (child services)
- Republic Services - Green Valley Landfill
