= Hopewell, Greenup County, Kentucky =

Unincorporated community in Kentucky, United States

Coordinates: 38°24′22″N 82°54′39″W

Hopewell is an unincorporated community in Greenup County, Kentucky, United States. It lies at an elevation of 561 feet (171 m).

A post office operated in the community from 1874 to 1957. It's named Hopewell because an early resident hoped his iron furnace operation would be as successful as that of one in Pennsylvania (now the Hopewell Furnace National Historic Site).
