= Ashland Community and Technical College =

Public college in Ashland, Kentucky, US

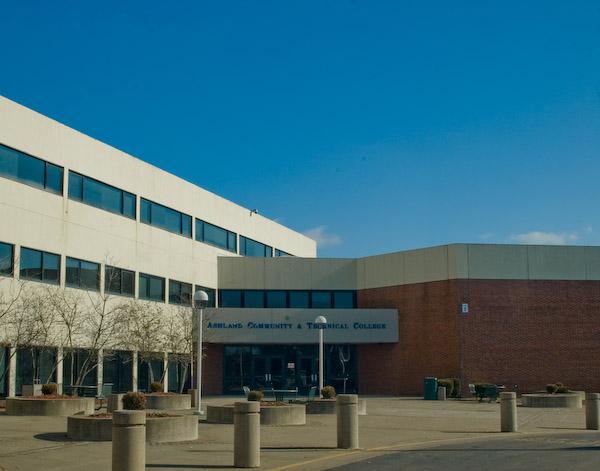
- Type: Public community college
- Established: 1938
- Parent institution: Kentucky Community and Technical College System
- Academic affiliations: Space-grant
- President: Dr. Larry Ferguson
- Location: Ashland, Kentucky, United States; 38°28′8.8″N 82°39′2.4″W
- Colors: Navy █ and Gold █
- Website: ashland.kctcs.edu

Ashland Community and Technical College (ACTC) is a public community college in Ashland, Kentucky. It is an open-admissions college and part of the Kentucky Community and Technical College System. It was founded in 1938 to allow students the opportunity to obtain associate degrees, certificates and diplomas as well as provide vocational and technical training. The courses offered range from Cosmetology, Culinary Arts, business, education, health-related courses, information technology and a range of industrial technology degrees among others.

== History ==
In 1936, with the Ashland Independent School District's Board of Education and first term Governor Happy Chandler's support, Ashland Oil and Refining Company founder and CEO Paul G. Blazer and Ashland attorney John T. Diederich, a leading Republican figure in the state, lobbied for the expansion of Kentucky State tax legislation (KRS 165) for municipal colleges and the associated passage of Ashland's local school tax. With the legislative leadership of State Senator Dr. H. S. Swope of Ashland and State Representative Ira W. See of Louisa, the act was passed by the Kentucky General Assembly in December 1936. In November 1937, Ashland was the first and only municipality to take advantage of the expanded tax legislation to establish a junior college.

A holding company, known as the Ashland Junior College Corporation, formed by the board of education in 1937, purchased the First M.E. Church's vacated property on the corner of 15th Street and Central Avenue for $39,000 in downtown Ashland. The church had bought the property for $163,000 in 1925, before the Great Depression of 1929.

The Ashland Junior College was founded in 1938 to allow students the opportunity to obtain an associate degree or to complete their first two years of a bachelor's degree. During the same year, the Ashland Vocational School was created by the Ashland Independent School system, providing vocational and technical training.

Dr. Herbert C. Hazel was elected dean of the Ashland Junior College in June 1938. A rate of $3 per semester hour for tuition for part-time students was set that year. Classes began September 14, 1938.

Within a few months of opening, the library had 2,200 volumes and the college became a member of the Kentucky Association Colleges and Secondary Schools and the American Association of Junior Colleges. Paul and Georgia Blazer established the Ashland Junior College Loan Fund in 1938 and s second loan fund known as the Ashland Business Men's Association Loan Fund was also established that year. The number of students enrolled the first year totaled 194 with four graduates.

During the 1942-1943 year, the center had two publications, "The Portico", the college annual, and the "Pony Prints", the student newspaper published twice monthly. "Pony Prints" was preceded by the publication of "The Quest" during the first year.

Due to World War II, only eight students graduated from the college in 1944. That was the year, however, that the first summer session opened for registration. The new school paper, "The Beacon" noted that year that the college had 191 representatives in the armed forces. The influx of veterans following the war raised enrollment to new heights when an increase of 42 per cent enrollment was recorded in 1945. By 1946 the total number of students was 440; however enrollment figures soon leveled off. Library volumes on file that year totaled 6,132. In 1948 an amendment was added to the H.S. Swope Act raising the limits of tuition for the college from $100 to $200 per semester. Accordingly, the tuition was raised from $45 to $80 per semester.

The student council, composed of a president and three members from each class, was organized in 1953. In support of the United States Supreme Court's 1954 "Brown vs. Board of Education" ruling ending segregation in schools, integration of the college began in 1955 with the enrollment of several graduates of the Booker T Washington High School in Ashland.

In June 1957, representing the Ashland Independent School District's Board of Education, Paul Blazer and Ashland attorney Henderson Dysard, a University of Kentucky Law School graduate, presented a proposal to President Frank G. Dickey and the University of Kentucky Board of Trustees for the university to take over the day-to-day operations and curriculum of the Ashland [municipal] Junior College. The Ashland Center of the University of Kentucky became the second University of Kentucky extension center.

Details of the planned relationship were contained in the agreement signed by the Ashland Board of Education and the University of Kentucky Board of Trustees. By this agreement the university would provide a course of study and administration which would be comparable to that of the university at Lexington and for which the students would receive the same credit as the students in Lexington. The Ashland Board of Education was to provide the buildings, land, equipment and facilities. All other expenses, including teacher salaries were to be paid by the University of Kentucky.

The Northern Extension Center of the University of Kentucky had been founded in Covington in 1948. After Ashland, with the continued support of second term Governor Happy Chandler, President Dickey further expanded the program by developing University of Kentucky Extension Centers in Fort Knox (1958), Cumberland (1960), and Henderson (1960).

Authorized by the Kentucky General Assembly and signed by Governor Bert Combs on March 6, 1962, a mandate was placed upon the University of Kentucky to form a community college system. Two years later, the Board of Trustees implemented the legislation and established the Community College System, recharacterizing the centers in Northern Kentucky, Ashland, Fort Knox, Cumberland, Henderson and creating a new campus in Elizabethtown. The Ashland Center of the University of Kentucky was renamed the Ashland Community College.

In 1968, the UK Northern (Covington) Community College separated from the new system and became an autonomous four-year college under the name Northern Kentucky State College. Ashland became the oldest campus in the Kentucky Community College system.

In 1970, Ashland Community College relocated to the College Drive campus.

On July 1, 1997, the Ashland Technical College and the Ashland Community College began preparations to merge under the "Higher Education Act", passed during a special session of the state legislature which also created the Kentucky Community and Technical College System (KCTCS). In the following year, in January 1998, the community college network in the commonwealth left the University of Kentucky to move to the new Kentucky Community and Technical College System. Five years later, on July 1, 2003, the Ashland Community & Technical College merged, consolidating functions.

In 2001, ground was broken for a new campus for the Ashland Technical College in the EastPark Industrial Park along the Industrial Parkway, with funding allocated two years prior. The 43,000 sq ft (4,000 m^{2}). campus, referred to as the 'Ashland Community and Technical College Technology Drive Campus, was dedicated on December 19, 2005, at a cost of $10.4 million, although it did not open until August 16, 2004. An additional $18 million in funding was provided in 2005 for phase two, which will include housing for Culinary Arts, recreation areas, a small bookstore and administrative offices, and for phase three, which will include housing for shop areas for diesel, carpentry, auto mechanics and applied process technologies.

On February 21, 2005, ACTC signed into agreement with Marshall University to provide less costly opportunities for students in obtaining bachelor degrees. The program, dubbed the "two-plus-two" agreement, would allow students to take lower-level courses at ACTC and the final two years at Marshall in Huntington, West Virginia. Although it was possible to receive a bachelor's degree in management from Marshall's Lewis College of Business, the agreement expanded the program to nine degrees in the business college.

Due to an aging facility, the Kentucky Community and Technical College System is currently requesting $20 million for the renovation of the College Drive campus, as well as an extra $5 million over the next two years when the Kentucky General Assembly meets in early 2008. The campus would receive a new roof, new electrical wiring, new heating and air conditioning units, improved security features, improvements to parking lots, new paint, a refurbished science lab and new equipment.

== Campus ==
Three campuses encompass the ACTC system, the primary campus located on College Drive near downtown Ashland near 13th Street and is where business, education, health-related, information technology and transfer programs are offered. The Roberts Drive campus, located at the southern edge of Ashland, offers several industrial technology degrees, such as air conditioning, applied process technologies, auto mechanics, computer aided drafting, and fire and rescue technology, as well as courses in cosmetology and culinary arts.

The Roberts Drive campus will ultimately be replaced with the Technology Drive campus, located off of KY 67 (Industrial Parkway) at the EastPark industrial park, which offers numerous industrial technology degrees that often reflect the job stock in the Ashland region that include programs in industrial maintenance, machine tool technology, electrical technology and welding. In addition to technical programs offered at the Technology Drive Campus, it also serves as the home for the college's Business and Industry Services.

== Academics ==
ACTC is accredited by the Southern Association of Colleges and Schools (SACS) to offer certificates, diplomas and associate degrees. It also partners with area four-year colleges and universities, such as Marshall University, Shawnee State University and the University of Kentucky to offer "two-plus-two" programs that guarantees students that the courses completed at ACTC will transfer to their majors at a four-year school. There are five primary departments at ACTC: Department of Business Technology and Education, Health Sciences, Humanities, Manufacturing, Transportation, and Industrial Technologies, and Math & Natural Science. The departments offer a total of twenty-seven associate degree programs.

The college also offers numerous transfer programs. The Center for Community, Workforce and Economic Development offers partnerships with local businesses and industries for on-demand performance- and quality-based training. The college is also home to the Ashland Area Innovation Center, a business accelerator that aids in the development of knowledge-based industries in eastern Kentucky, and the Entrepreneur Center, a small business incubator that provides assistance for about two to three years to individuals or groups of individuals who have a desire to start a business. ACTC also offers a Ready to Work, and a similar Work to Learn program that assists low-income students and parents in northeastern Kentucky. The former provides paid work experience on and off campus, counseling and advising, job references and referrals, job readiness and life skills, while the latter provides basic adult education for those attempting to receive a GED.

=== Libraries ===
The Ashland Community and Technical College provides two libraries. The Joseph and Sylvia Mansbach Library is located on the College Drive Campus, and is a research library and computer information center. It contains over 40,000 volumes, 1,000 videotapes and 380 periodical subscriptions, along with numerous online resources, and features a computer study area. The library also hosts numerous special collections, including materials relating to Jesse Stuart and Jean Thomas, and the Ashworth Collection for Learning Disabilities. The facility has also been a federal depository for over 60,000 government publications and information since 1990, which serves Kentucky's 4th congressional district.

It also offers a smaller library at the Roberts Drive Campus.

== Endowment ==
ACTC received a $150,000 gift from Ashland Inc. in December 2003 that created a permanently restricted endowment fund, the proceeds of which were distributed to ACTC and other KCTCS colleges to support math and science initiatives with a specific focus on high school and middle school students.

In 2004, the Ashland Community and Technical College established the Fulfilling the Promise Campaign to set an endowment goal of $3.2 million. The first major contribution was from Perry and Susan Madden in December 2006, who donated the former Parsons Department Store building in downtown Ashland. The 89,000 sq ft (8,300 m^{2}). building, dating to 1926, currently houses the Highlands Museum and Discovery Center and the upper four-floors could be renovated for college classrooms and for a 500-seat convention center under a $10 million to $12 million program. The museum will continue to occupy the ground floor, mezzanine and basement.

On September 12, 2007, an anonymous gift of $1 million was made to the community college's foundation to establish an endowed chair in mathematics and sciences. The endowed fund was designed to "reward and encourage outstanding math and science faculty in perpetuity" and it was the first gift of over $1 million that the college had received. Recipients will receive an annual cash reward of 2% of the value of the endowment fund each year for a two-year period, with an additional award recipient added each year.

As a result of the gift of $1 million, total endowment credited during the campaign was $5.2 million. Other major gifts included funding of faculty and nursing classes at King's Daughters Medical Center, the Booth Foundation, Saul and Harriett Kaplan Foundation scholarships, Lincoln and Katherine and Scott scholarships and partial funding of evening nursing classes at Our Lady of Bellefonte Hospital. The campaign funded $333,000 in scholarships.

== Student life ==
ACTC has an active student population, with several organizations and associations spread across three campuses. The main campus hosts three organizations that include a Baptist Student Union, a student-led organization that offers fellowship and devotion, a Drama Club that is open for those with an interest in theater production, and Students in Free Enterprise, a nationwide student organization that promotes partnership with area businesses to develop projects which teach the principles of free enterprise and entrepreneurship. Several associations are located on the main campus and include the Kentucky Association of Nursing Students, a national pre-professional organization for students interested in nursing or enrolled in the nursing program, the Multicultural Student Association, a group that promotes cross-cultural and racial understanding, and Phi Theta Kappa, an international honor society for two-year colleges. Two inter-college organizations include Student Ambassadors, who serve as hosts or hostesses, tour guides and recruitment role models and Student Government, which provides a representative body of the student body.

The College Drive campus also contains a theater, which hosts numerous student-organized productions throughout the year.
