= Grayson Lake State Park =

State park in Kentucky, United States

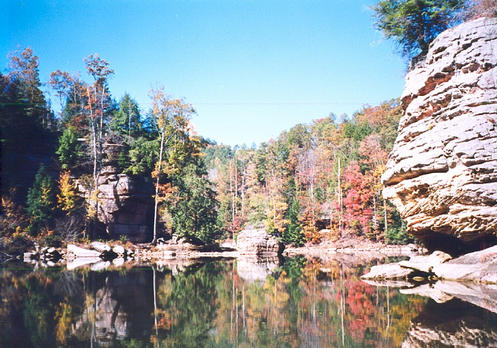
- Grayson Lake

- Location within Kentucky Location within the United States
- Type: Kentucky state park
- Location: Carter County; Elliott County
- Coordinates: 38°12′58″N 83°01′03″W
- Area: 1,512 acres (612 ha)
- Created: 1970
- Operator: Kentucky Department of Parks
- Open: Year-round
- Website: Official website

Grayson Lake State Park is a Kentucky state park located in Carter and Elliott counties, near the city of Grayson, Kentucky. The park has an area of 1,512 acres (612 ha). It has facilities for boating, water skiing, swimming, fishing and golfing. It is served by Kentucky Route 7, which was re-routed as a result of the lake's creation.
