= Flatwoods, Kentucky =

- City
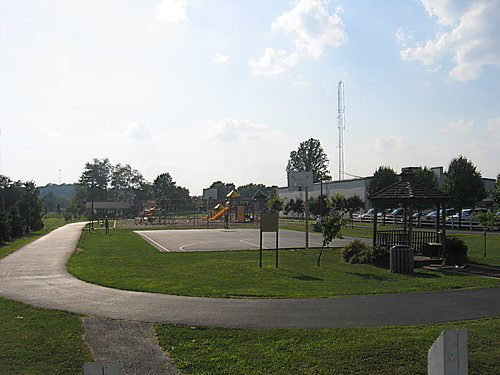
- B.F. Crager Park in Flatwoods
- Nickname: Good Neighbor Community
- Location of Flatwoods in Greenup County, Kentucky.

- Location within Kentucky Location within the United States
- Coordinates: 38°31′23″N 82°43′10″W
- Country: United States
- State: Kentucky
- County: Greenup

Government
  - Mayor: Buford Hurley II

Area
  - Total: 3.26 sq mi (8.45 km^{2})
  - Land: 3.26 sq mi (8.44 km^{2})
  - Water: 0.0039 sq mi (0.01 km^{2})
- Elevation: 682 ft (208 m)

Population (2020)
  - Total: 7,325
  - Estimate (2022): 7,243
  - Density: 2,246.9/sq mi (867.52/km^{2})
- Time zone: UTC-5 (EST)
  - Summer (DST): UTC-4 (EDT)
- ZIP code: 41139
- Area code: 606
- FIPS code: 21-27802
- GNIS feature ID: 0492225
- Website: www.flatwoodsky.gov

Flatwoods is a home rule-class city in Greenup County, Kentucky, United States. The population was 7,325 at the 2020 census, making it the largest city in Greenup County. Flatwoods is a part of the Huntington–Ashland metropolitan area. Locally, Flatwoods is considered to be a bedroom community, as it has no large employer within the city. Many residents work for CSX Transportation, Marathon Petroleum, or King's Daughters Medical Center.

== History ==
The area now known as Flatwoods was originally named "Advance": Advance Methodist Church formed a Sunday school beginning in 1860. The name was later changed to "Cheap", after John Cheap, a blind clergyman. The original farming community returned to the name of "Advance" when a post office was established in 1918. In 1938, the post office was renamed "Flatwoods", and the town was incorporated the same year under that name. Flatwoods is named for the area's unique topography, a belt of flat wooded land in the ancient Teays River valley on an elevation of approximately 650 feet (200 m) or higher, just south of and 150 feet (46 m) higher than the Ohio River valley. The availability of flat level land and low tax rates made Flatwoods a local hot spot of new construction in the 1950s and 1960s, when many upper-middle-class tract housing developments were built and quickly inhabited. A main contributor to Flatwoods' growth was that nearby Ashland had developed much of its available land prior to 1960, with little new construction possible within its corporation limits.

== Geography ==
Flatwoods is located in eastern Greenup County, between Raceland to the northwest and Russell to the southeast. U.S. Route 23 (Seaton Avenue) forms the northeast border of Flatwoods; the highway leads southeast 6 miles (10 km) to Ashland and northwest 7 miles (11 km) to Greenup. According to the United States Census Bureau, Flatwoods has a total area of 3.2 square miles (8.4 km^{2}), all land.

The topography of Flatwoods is uncharacteristic to eastern Kentucky in that it consists of flat to rolling land on a single elevated hill. In eastern Kentucky, the dissected plateau landscape often referred to as "hill and valley" is standard terrain for the surrounding region. The flat terrain found in Flatwoods was created when it was the river bed of the ancient Teays River, which traveled through the area in prehistoric times, much larger than the Ohio River that now passes through the region.

=== Climate ===
Climate data for Flatwoods, Kentucky
Month	Jan	Feb	Mar	Apr	May	Jun	Jul	Aug	Sep	Oct	Nov	Dec	Year
Record high °F (°C)	81 (27)	79 (26)	92 (33)	96 (36)	98 (37)	102 (39)	107 (42)	106 (41)	103 (39)	94 (34)	86 (30)	79 (26)	107 (42)
Mean daily maximum °F (°C)	42 (6)	48 (9)	57 (14)	68 (20)	77 (25)	85 (29)	88 (31)	86 (30)	80 (27)	69 (21)	57 (14)	46 (8)	66.6 (19.2)
Mean daily minimum °F (°C)	21 (−6)	24 (−4)	34 (1)	42 (6)	51 (11)	60 (16)	64 (18)	63 (17)	56 (13)	44 (7)	35 (2)	27 (−3)	43.4 (6.3)
Record low °F (°C)	−15 (−26)	−6 (−21)	−6 (−21)	12 (−11)	26 (−3)	37 (3)	40 (4)	41 (5)	28 (−2)	17 (−8)	1 (−17)	−24 (−31)	−24 (−31)
Average precipitation inches (mm)	2.70 (69)	2.90 (74)	3.70 (94)	3.70 (94)	4.20 (107)	3.80 (97)	4.80 (122)	4.20 (107)	2.90 (74)	2.80 (71)	3.20 (81)	3.40 (86)	42.3 (1,070)
Source: The Weather Channel.

== Demographics ==
Historical population
Census	Pop.	Note	%±
1960	3,741		—
1970	7,380		97.3%
1980	8,354		13.2%
1990	7,799		−6.6%
2000	7,605		−2.5%
2010	7,423		−2.4%
2020	7,325		−1.3%
2024 (est.)	7,250		−1.0%
U.S. Decennial Census

=== 2020 census ===
As of the 2020 census, Flatwoods had a population of 7,325. The median age was 42.7 years. 22.3% of residents were under the age of 18 and 21.7% of residents were 65 years of age or older. For every 100 females there were 89.2 males, and for every 100 females age 18 and over there were 84.6 males age 18 and over.

100.0% of residents lived in urban areas, while 0.0% lived in rural areas.

There were 3,019 households in Flatwoods, of which 29.4% had children under the age of 18 living in them. Of all households, 44.3% were married-couple households, 16.0% were households with a male householder and no spouse or partner present, and 32.9% were households with a female householder and no spouse or partner present. About 29.5% of all households were made up of individuals and 15.2% had someone living alone who was 65 years of age or older.

There were 3,320 housing units, of which 9.1% were vacant. The homeowner vacancy rate was 2.0% and the rental vacancy rate was 7.0%.

Racial composition as of the 2020 census
Race	Number	Percent
White	6,852	93.5%
Black or African American	56	0.8%
American Indian and Alaska Native	10	0.1%
Asian	41	0.6%
Native Hawaiian and Other Pacific Islander	0	0.0%
Some other race	38	0.5%
Two or more races	328	4.5%
Hispanic or Latino (of any race)	65	0.9%

=== 2000 census ===
As of the census of 2000, there were 7,605 people, 3,114 households, and 2,282 families residing in the city. The population density was 1,691.9 inhabitants per square mile (653.2/km^{2}). There were 3,338 housing units at an average density of 742.6 per square mile (286.7/km^{2}). The racial makeup of the city was 98.19% White, 0.38% African American, 0.20% Native American, 0.36% Asian, 0.30% from other races, and 0.58% from two or more races. Hispanic or Latino of any race were 0.58% of the population.

There were 3,114 households, out of which 31.3% had children under the age of 18 living with them, 58.0% were married couples living together, 12.6% had a female householder with no husband present, and 26.7% were non-families. 24.1% of all households were made up of individuals, and 11.3% had someone living alone who was 65 years of age or older. The average household size was 2.41 and the average family size was 2.85.

In the city the population was spread out, with 23.0% under the age of 18, 7.7% from 18 to 24, 28.0% from 25 to 44, 25.0% from 45 to 64, and 16.3% who were 65 years of age or older. The median age was 40 years. For every 100 females, there were 87.5 males. For every 100 females age 18 and over, there were 82.1 males.

The median income for a household in the city was $31,115, and the median income for a family was $39,023. Males had a median income of $36,184 versus $20,904 for females. The per capita income for the city was $17,633. About 9.7% of families and 11.6% of the population were below the poverty line, including 12.0% of those under age 18 and 10.3% of those age 65 or over.

== Education ==
The majority of the city sits within the Russell Independent School District, which also includes the cities of Russell and Bellefonte. The main campus for the district, which includes Russell High School, Russell Middle School, Russell Primary School and the Russell Area Technology Center, sits on Red Devil Lane on the Russell/Flatwoods city line; the schools' mailing addresses are Russell but they primarily receive police and fire protection from Flatwoods. The city boundary passes through the high school building, as well as the school's athletic facilities. The middle and primary schools are entirely within Flatwoods, and all but a small part of the technology center is also in Flatwoods. In addition, one school, Russell-McDowell Intermediate School, sits on Long Street, firmly within the Flatwoods city limits. The district's central office is on Powell Lane in Flatwoods, near Russell-McDowell Intermediate School.

Some students in a small section of the city near The French Oaks winery attend the Raceland-Worthington Independent School District.

There are six institutions of higher education located within an hour's drive of Flatwoods: Ashland Community and Technical College in Ashland, Kentucky Christian University in Grayson, Ohio University Southern Campus in Ironton, Ohio, Shawnee State University in Portsmouth, Ohio as well as Marshall University and Mountwest Community and Technical College, both of which are located in Huntington, West Virginia.

The Greenup County Public Library has a branch library on Argillite Road in Flatwoods.

== Public safety ==
Flatwoods is protected by its own police and fire departments. In addition, surrounding fire and police departments are in a mutual aid agreement with the city of Flatwoods. Emergency medical service is provided by the Greenup County Ambulance Authority under an interlocal agreement with the East Greenup County Ambulance Tax District, of which Flatwoods is a member.

- Flatwoods Fire Department (Station 100) is located at 804 Powell Lane. It is home to 2 engines and 1 Ladder Truck.
- Flatwoods Police Department is located in the city's municipal building at 2513 Reed Street.
- The Greenup County Ambulance Authority operates a station at 1104 Powell Lane in Flatwoods.

== Television ==
- WSAZ-TV
- WOWK-TV

== Notable person ==
- Billy Ray Cyrus, country singer, actor and father of singer Miley Cyrus
