= Willard, Kentucky =

Unincorporated community in Kentucky, United States

- Unincorporated community
- Location within the state of Kentucky Willard (the United States)
- Coordinates: 38°12′42″N 82°53′50″W
- Country: United States
- State: Kentucky
- County: Carter
- Elevation: 630 ft (190 m)
- Time zone: UTC-5 (Eastern (EST))
  - Summer (DST): UTC-4 (EST)
- ZIP codes: 41181
- GNIS feature ID: 506774

Willard is an unincorporated community and coal town in Carter County, Kentucky, United States.
