= Wurtland, Kentucky =

- City
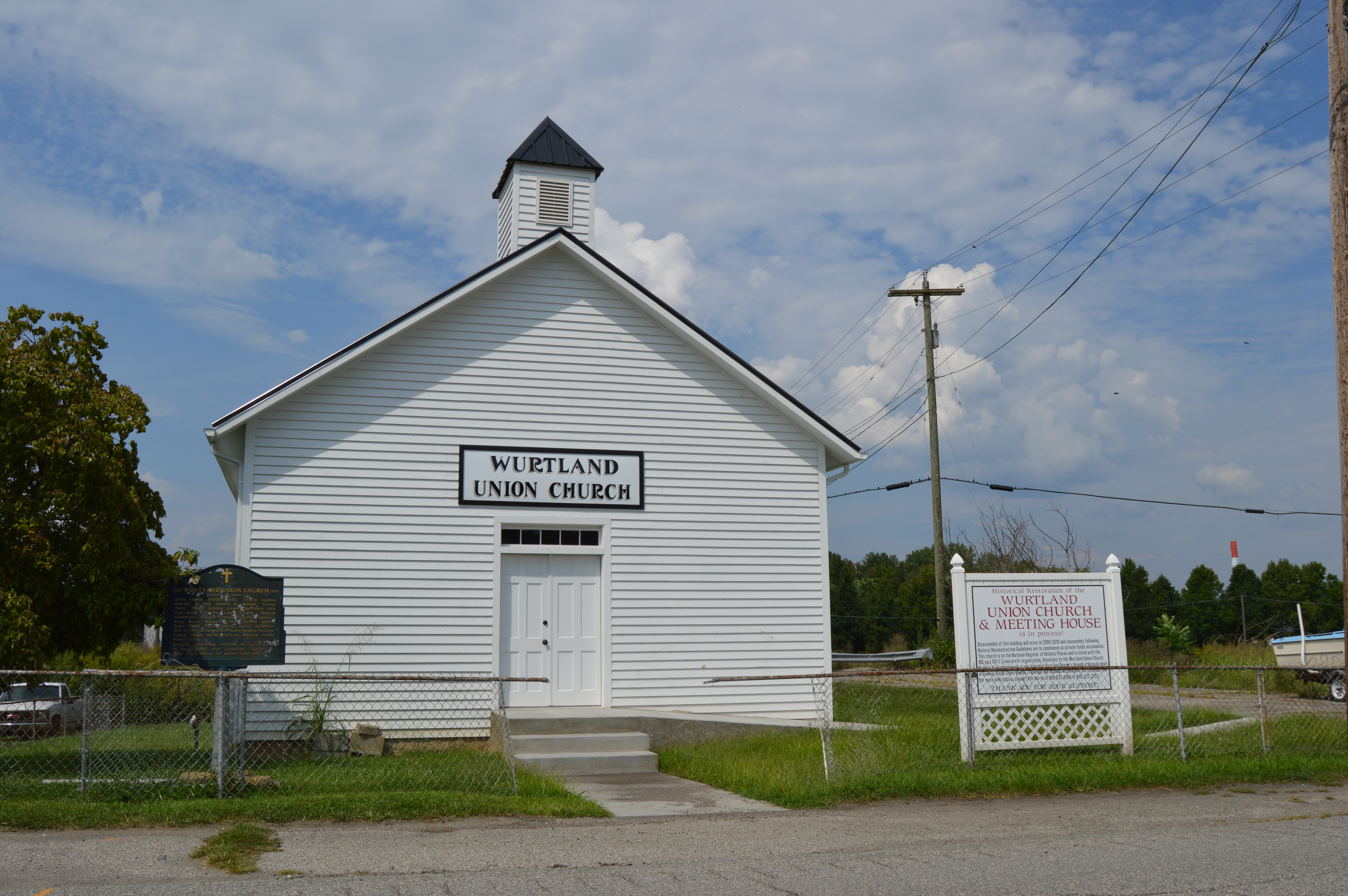
- Wurtland Union Church

- Location of Wurtland in Greenup County, Kentucky.
- Coordinates: 38°32′58″N 82°46′29″W
- Country: United States
- State: Kentucky
- County: Greenup
- Incorporated: September 15, 1970

Government
  - Type: City Commission
  - Mayor: Bobby Reynolds

Area
  - Total: 1.81 sq mi (4.68 km^{2})
  - Land: 1.77 sq mi (4.58 km^{2})
  - Water: 0.039 sq mi (0.10 km^{2})
- Elevation: 551 ft (168 m)

Population (2020)
  - Total: 983
  - Density: 556/sq mi (214.8/km^{2})
- Time zone: UTC-5 (Eastern (EST))
  - Summer (DST): UTC-4 (EDT)
- ZIP code: 41144
- Area code: 606
- FIPS code: 21-85008
- GNIS feature ID: 0507172
- Website: https://www.cityofwurtland.com/

Wurtland is a home rule-class city in Greenup County, Kentucky, United States, along the Ohio River. The population was 983 at the 2020 census. It is part of the Huntington–Ashland metropolitan area.

The northern terminus of the Industrial Parkway (Kentucky Route 67) is at U.S. Route 23 in Wurtland. This highway serves to connect Wurtland and the surrounding towns of Greenup and Flatwoods to the EastPark industrial park and Interstate 64, 14 miles (23 km) south of Wurtland.

== History ==
The Wurtland vicinity was first settled by Alexander Fulton and his family circa 1830. The Fultons then established the Fulton's Forge Works, and the community became known as "Fulton's Forge". In 1823, William Shreve and his family had built a steam furnace nearby, and they named their settlement (the) "Old Steam Furnace". Because neither of the settlements had an acceptable name for a post office, the post office was named "Oil Works" after a local factory that made kerosene. Although the Oil Works post office was established on January 14, 1864, it was closed in 1871. On February 28, 1876, the post office was reestablished as "Wurtland", named after George and Samuel Grandin Wurts who had founded the nearby Pennsylvania and Laurel Furnaces in 1848.

== Geography ==
Wurtland is located in eastern Greenup County at 38°32′58″N 82°46′29″W (38.549327, -82.774749), on the south bank of the Ohio River. It is bordered to the east by the cities of Worthington and Raceland, and Greenup, the county seat, is 3 miles (5 km) to the west. Directly across the river is Hamilton Township in Lawrence County, Ohio.

According to the United States Census Bureau, Wurtland has a total area of 1.8 square miles (4.7 km^{2}), of which 1.8 square miles (4.6 km^{2}) is land and 0.04 square miles (0.1 km^{2}), or 2.23%, is water.

== Demographics ==
Historical population
| Census | Pop. | Note | %± |
|---|---|---|---|
| 1980 | 1,301 | | — |
| 1990 | 1,221 | | −6.1% |
| 2000 | 1,049 | | −14.1% |
| 2010 | 995 | | −5.1% |
| 2020 | 983 | | −1.2% |
U.S. Decennial Census

As of the census of 2000, there were 1,049 people, 400 households, and 290 families residing in the city. The population density was 731.1 inhabitants per square mile (282.3/km^{2}). There were 436 housing units at an average density of 303.9 per square mile (117.3/km^{2}). The racial makeup of the city was 99.43% White, 0.19% African American, 0.19% Native American, and 0.19% from two or more races.

There were 400 households, out of which 25.8% had children under the age of 18 living with them, 57.0% were married couples living together, 10.8% had a female householder with no husband present, and 27.5% were non-families. 26.0% of all households were made up of individuals, and 13.0% had someone living alone who was 65 years of age or older. The average household size was 2.39 and the average family size was 2.82.

In the city the population was spread out, with 18.5% under the age of 18, 8.0% from 18 to 24, 24.9% from 25 to 44, 22.5% from 45 to 64, and 26.1% who were 65 years of age or older. The median age was 44 years. For every 100 females, there were 84.0 males. For every 100 females age 18 and over, there were 81.5 males.

The median income for a household in the city was $25,724, and the median income for a family was $34,063. Males had a median income of $35,104 versus $18,523 for females. The per capita income for the city was $15,122. About 12.7% of families and 13.9% of the population were below the poverty line, including 18.5% of those under age 18 and 7.7% of those age 65 or over.

== Government ==
Wurtland is governed by a city commission form of government. Its current mayor is Bobby Reynolds. The city commission consists of a panel of four members.

=== Policing ===
The city of Wurtland currently contracts primary police service with the neighboring city of Raceland. Wurtland previously maintained its own police department prior to 2013 which was dissolved due to budget cuts. Wurtland's other neighboring cities, Greenup and Worthington, provide mutual aid assistance to the Raceland Police within the city of Wurtland. In addition, the Greenup County Sheriff's Department and the Kentucky State Police maintain concurrent jurisdiction within the city and assist with policing as needed.

== See also ==
- List of cities and towns along the Ohio River
