= Little Sandy River (Kentucky) =

River in Kentucky, United States

Coordinates: 38°34′53″N 82°50′22″W

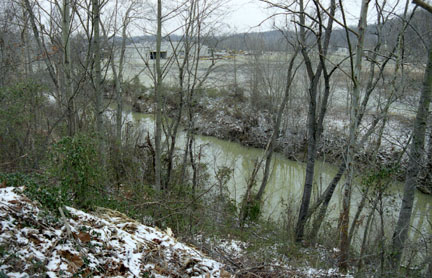
The East Fork of the Little Sandy River at Cannonsburg, Kentucky

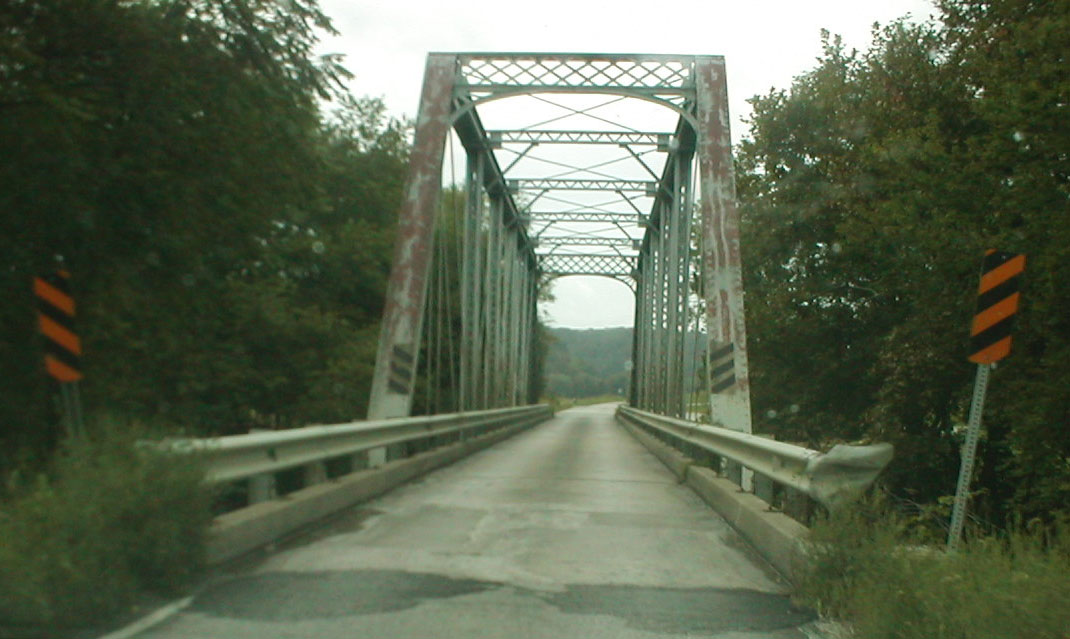
A bridge built for the Eastern Kentucky Railway, now used by Kentucky Route 773 over the Little Sandy River

The Little Sandy River is a tributary of the Ohio River in northeastern Kentucky in the United States. It is 85.4 miles (137.4 km) long drains an area of 724.2 square miles (1,876 km^{2}). Via the Ohio, it is part of the Mississippi River watershed.

== Course ==
The Little Sandy rises in southern Elliott County and flows generally north-northeastwardly in a meandering course through Elliott, Carter and Greenup counties, through the towns of Sandy Hook and Grayson. It joins the Ohio River at Greenup.

At its mouth, the Little Sandy River's mean annual discharge is 840.51 cubic feet per second (23.801 m^{3}/s).

== Dams ==
A U.S. Army Corps of Engineers dam in Carter County causes the river to widen as Grayson Lake in southern Carter and northern Elliott Counties. Grayson Lake State Park is located along this impoundment.

== East Fork Little Sandy River ==
The East Fork Little Sandy River, 48.3 miles (77.7 km) long, joins the main stream in Greenup County. It rises in northern Lawrence County and initially flows eastwardly before turning north-northwestwardly through Boyd and Greenup Counties. It flows past the Ashland suburb of Cannonsburg.

== See also ==
- Big Sandy River
- List of Kentucky rivers
