= Greenup, Kentucky =

- City
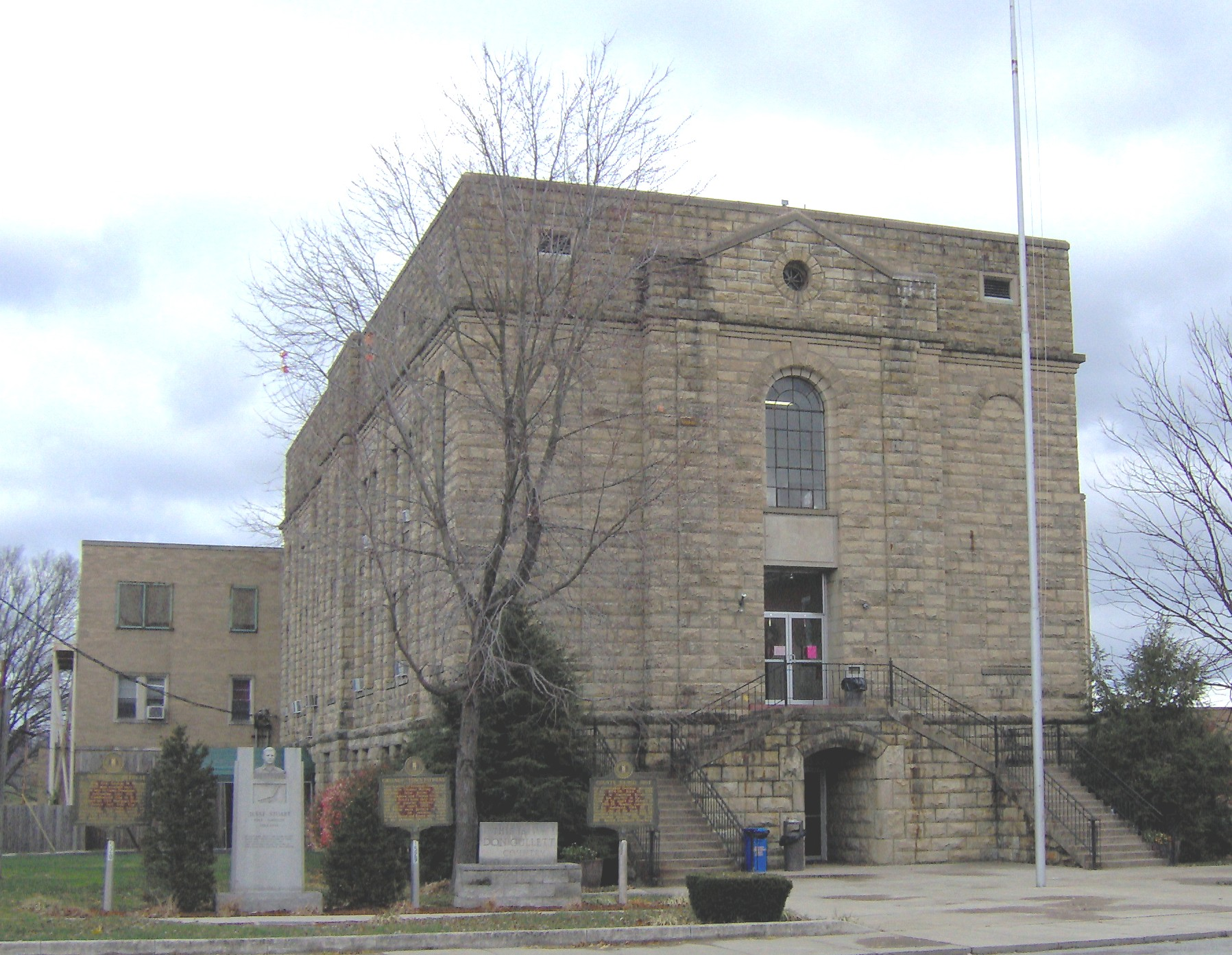
- Greenup County Courthouse

- Location of Greenup in Greenup County, Kentucky.

- Location within Kentucky Location within the United States
- Coordinates: 38°34′25″N 82°50′1″W
- Country: United States
- State: Kentucky
- County: Greenup
- Established: February 4, 1818
- Incorporated: February 29, 1848
- Named for: Greenup County

Government
  - Type: Mayor–council
  - Mayor: Lundie Meadows

Area
  - Total: 2.19 sq mi (5.66 km^{2})
  - Land: 1.73 sq mi (4.49 km^{2})
  - Water: 0.45 sq mi (1.17 km^{2})
- Elevation: 520 ft (160 m)

Population (2020)
  - Total: 1,095
  - Density: 631.8/sq mi (243.94/km^{2})
- Time zone: UTC-5 (Eastern (EST))
  - Summer (DST): UTC-4 (EDT)
- ZIP code: 41144
- Area code: 606
- FIPS code: 21-33004
- GNIS feature ID: 0493340
- Website: www.greenupky.net

Greenup is a home rule-class city in and the county seat of Greenup County, Kentucky, United States, located at the confluence of the Little Sandy River with the Ohio River. The population was 1,095 at the 2020 census. It is part of the Huntington–Ashland metropolitan area.

== History ==
Greenup was laid out in 1803 and 1804 by Robert Johnson, a pioneer and legislator who owned the land. Upon the formation of Greenup County (named for the former congressman Christopher Greenup, who later served as governor) out of land separated from Mason County, Johnson's settlement was chosen to be the seat of government and adopted the name "Greenupsburg". Its post office was erected on July 1, 1811. The state assembly formally established the town on February 4, 1818, and incorporated the city thirty years later on February 29, 1848. The name was shortened to "Greenup" on March 13, 1872, partially to avoid confusion with Greensburg.

On August 14, 1829, an event known as the Greenup Slave Revolt occurred when a group of fifty-five enslaved individuals, who were forcibly marching, broke free from their chains near Tygarts Creek and began to attack their oppressors. In the struggle, two slaves were killed, while sixteen were able to escape. All escapees were eventually recaptured, and six of the slaves faced murder charges in Greenup, in which on October 6, they were found guilty. On November 20, four of the slaves were publicly hanged. However, the other two were eventually pardoned on April 28, 1830.

Around 1865 the Eastern Kentucky Railway Company established its headquarters, rail yard, and depot at Riverton or eastern Greenup.

The Ohio River flood of 1937 brought devastation to Greenup and many other towns along the river. Some people left the area permanently, with the population of Greenup showing a decline of 5.5% in the 1940 census.

Greenup is one of three county seats in the Commonwealth of Kentucky to share its name with its county; the other two being Harlan and Henderson.

== Geography ==
Greenup is located in eastern Greenup County at 38°34′25″N 82°50′1″W (38.573503, -82.833549), along the south bank of the Ohio River. The northeast boundary of the city follows the Ohio–Kentucky border within the river. The Little Sandy River forms most of the western boundary of the city, except for a small portion of the city that extends west across the river between Seaton Avenue and Main Street.

U.S. Route 23 (Seaton Avenue) runs through the southwest side of the city, leading northwest 19 miles (31 km) to Portsmouth, Ohio and southeast 13 miles (21 km) to Ashland, Kentucky. Kentucky Route 1 leads south 23 miles (37 km) to Grayson, and Kentucky Route 2 leads southwest 37 miles (60 km) to Olive Hill.

According to the United States Census Bureau, Greenup has a total area of 1.2 square miles (3.2 km^{2}), of which 0.77 square miles (2.0 km^{2}) is land and 0.42 square miles (1.1 km^{2}), or 36.08%, is water.

== Government ==
The city of Greenup has a mayor–council form of government. The city's current mayor is Lundie Meadows. Its representative body is the city council, which has six members elected from single-member districts.

=== Public safety ===
Greenup is protected by its own police and fire departments. In addition, surrounding fire and police departments are in a mutual aid agreement with the city of Greenup. Also, the Greenup County Sheriff's Department offices are located in the Greenup County Courthouse in downtown Greenup. Emergency medical service is provided by the Greenup County Ambulance Authority under an interlocal agreement with the East Greenup County Ambulance Tax District, of which Greenup is a member.

- Greenup Fire Department (Station 70) is located at 1110 Walnut Street.
- Greenup Police Department is located in the city's municipal building located at 1005 Walnut Street.
- The Greenup County Ambulance Authority operates a station on Collins Avenue adjacent to the Robert W. Carpenter Public Safety Center on US 23.

== Demographics ==
Historical population
Census	Pop.	Note	%±
1870	507		—
1880	833		64.3%
1890	669		−19.7%
1900	711		6.3%
1910	680		−4.4%
1920	910		33.8%
1930	1,125		23.6%
1940	1,063		−5.5%
1950	1,276		20.0%
1960	1,240		−2.8%
1970	1,284		3.5%
1980	1,386		7.9%
1990	1,158		−16.5%
2000	1,198		3.5%
2010	1,188		−0.8%
2020	1,095		−7.8%
U.S. Decennial Census

As of the census of 2000, there were 1,198 people, 478 households, and 321 families residing in the city. The population density was 1,523.0 inhabitants per square mile (588.0/km^{2}). There were 526 housing units at an average density of 668.7 per square mile (258.2/km^{2}). The racial makeup of the city was 90.07% White, 8.85% African American, 0.25% Native American, 0.17% Asian, 0.17% from other races, and 0.50% from two or more races. Hispanic or Latino of any race were 0.75% of the population.

There were 478 households, out of which 24.3% had children under the age of 18 living with them, 54.0% were married couples living together, 11.7% had a female householder with no husband present, and 32.8% were non-families. 31.0% of all households were made up of individuals, and 17.2% had someone living alone who was 65 years of age or older. The average household size was 2.27 and the average family size was 2.83.

In the city the population was spread out, with 18.5% under the age of 18, 10.2% from 18 to 24, 30.1% from 25 to 44, 22.8% from 45 to 64, and 18.4% who were 65 years of age or older. The median age was 39 years. For every 100 females, there were 96.4 males. For every 100 females age 18 and over, there were 94.0 males.

The median income for a household in the city was $33,158, and the median income for a family was $41,548. Males had a median income of $33,750 versus $23,036 for females. The per capita income for the city was $15,926. About 6.2% of families and 10.7% of the population were below the poverty line, including 10.7% of those under age 18 and 12.1% of those age 65 or over.

== Education ==
The main branch of the Greenup County Public Library is located in downtown Greenup.

== Notable people ==
- Clint Thomas, baseball player in the Negro leagues

== See also ==
- List of cities and towns along the Ohio River
