= Grayson, Kentucky =

- City
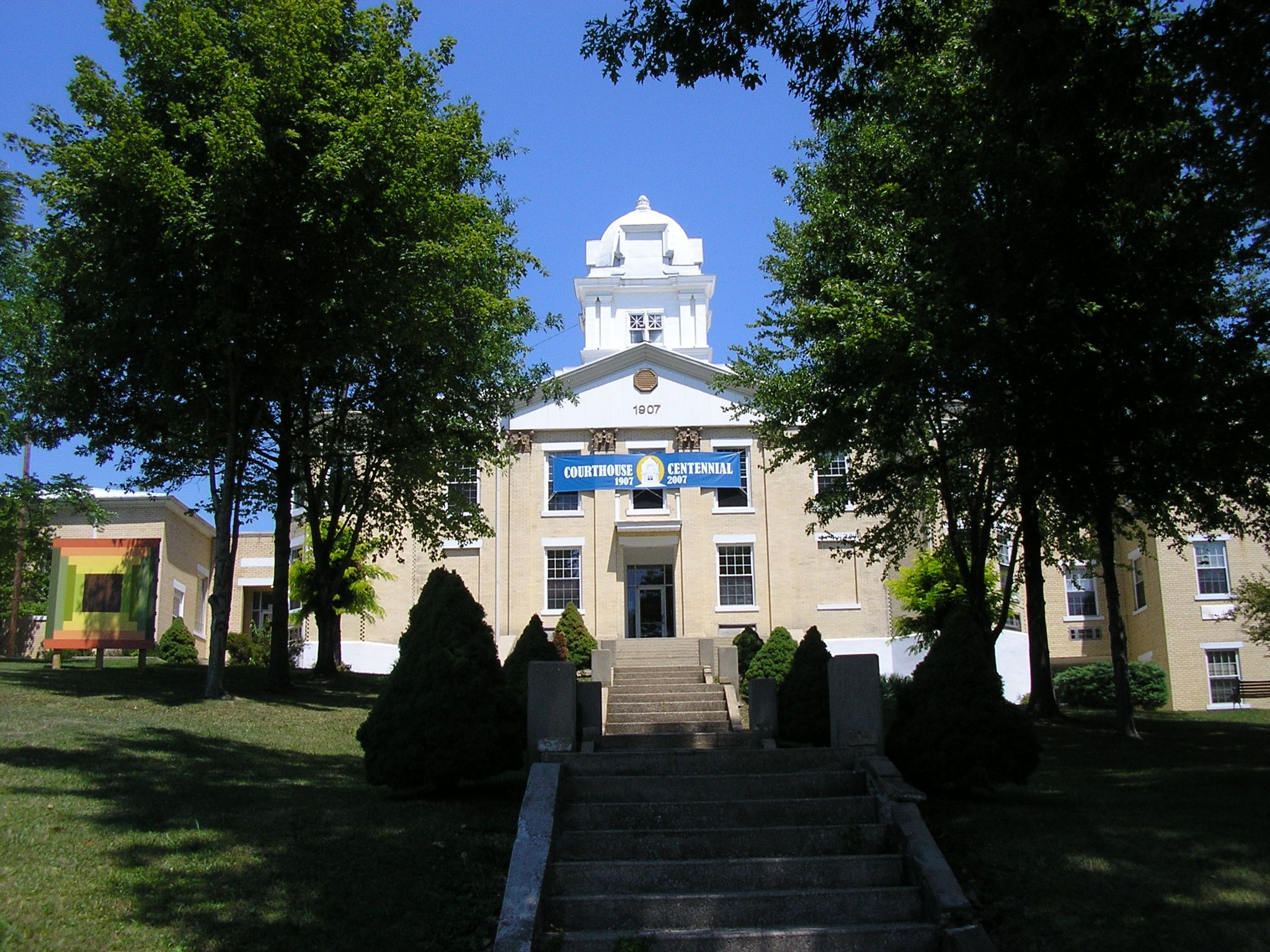
- Carter County Courthouse in Grayson
- Motto: "Heart of the Parks"
- Location of Grayson in Carter County, Kentucky.
- Coordinates: 38°19′55″N 82°56′14″W
- Country: United States
- State: Kentucky
- County: Carter
- Named for: Landowner William Grayson

Government
  - Mayor: Troy Combs

Area
  - Total: 2.83 sq mi (7.32 km^{2})
  - Land: 2.77 sq mi (7.17 km^{2})
  - Water: 0.058 sq mi (0.15 km^{2})
- Elevation: 584 ft (178 m)

Population (2020)
  - Total: 3,834 ▼
  - Estimate (2024): 3,702
  - Density: 1,384.3/sq mi (534.47/km^{2})
- Time zone: UTC-5 (Eastern (EST))
  - Summer (DST): UTC-4 (EDT)
- ZIP code: 41143
- Area code: 606
- FIPS code: 21-32572
- GNIS feature ID: 2403732
- Website: www.graysonky.org

Grayson is a home rule-class city in and the county seat of Carter County, Kentucky, United States, on U.S. Route 60 and Interstate 64 in the state's northeastern region. It is approximately 21 miles west of Ashland. As of the 2020 census, Grayson had a population of 3,834. Along with Carter County, the city is closely associated with the nearby Huntington-Ashland, WV-KY-OH Metropolitan Statistical Area and is often erroneously included in the MSA being just 9 miles west of the MSA's western boundary.

The city has grown in size substantially since the opening of Interstate 64 in 1975 through Carter County. Immediately afterwards, Grayson experienced several years of commercial sector growth, mainly to serve the Interstate 64 traffic. Since 1990, the city has also seen significant growth in the residential sector with the Interstate making for a faster trip to and from Ashland. Beginning in 1995, AA Highway terminates in Grayson making the city a gateway to the Huntington-Ashland urban area.

== History ==
After the Revolutionary War, George Washington's aide-de-camp Col. William Grayson received a 70,000-acre (280 km^{2}) tract of land for his service during the war from the state of Virginia. By 1838, a small portion of this tract was set aside for the development of a town named for him. Although Grayson had only five streets and eighty lots, it was established by the General Assembly on February 6, 1844, and it was incorporated on February 22, 1860. Grayson, Kentucky was a stop on the Eastern Kentucky Railway.

== Geography ==
Grayson is located in east-central Carter County along the Little Sandy River, a tributary of the Ohio River.

Route 60 passes through the city as Main Street and is intersected in downtown by Kentucky Routes 1 and 7 (Carol Malone Boulevard). Interstate 64 runs through the northern end of the city, with access to KY 7 at Exit 172. Kentucky Route 9, the AA Highway, begins from KY 1-and-7 just north of the city limits and runs 111 miles (179 km) to the Cincinnati area. Huntington, West Virginia, is 29 miles (47 km) east of Grayson via I-64, and Lexington is 96 miles (154 km) to the west.

According to the United States Census Bureau, Grayson has a total area of 2.9 square miles (7.5 km^{2}), of which 2.8 square miles (7.3 km^{2}) is land and 0.039 square miles (0.1 km^{2}), or 1.95%, is water.

=== Climate ===
The climate in this area is characterized by hot, humid summers and generally mild to cool winters. According to the Köppen Climate Classification system, Grayson has a humid subtropical climate, abbreviated "Cfa" on climate maps. Since 2002, nine different severe storms have struck Grayson, with each storm causing enough damage to warrant federal assistance for disaster recovery.

== Education ==
Grayson is served by Carter County Schools. Schools located within the city include:

- Heritage Elementary School
- Prichard Elementary School
- East Carter Middle School
- East Carter High School

The campus of Kentucky Christian University (formerly Kentucky Christian College) is located in Grayson.

Grayson has a lending library, a branch of the Carter County Public Library.

== Demographics ==
Historical population
Census	Pop.	Note	%±
1870	152		—
1880	447		194.1%
1890	433		−3.1%
1900	606		40.0%
1910	735		21.3%
1920	822		11.8%
1930	1,022		24.3%
1940	1,176		15.1%
1950	1,363		15.9%
1960	1,692		24.1%
1970	2,184		29.1%
1980	3,423		56.7%
1990	3,510		2.5%
2000	3,877		10.5%
2010	4,217		8.8%
2020	3,834		−9.1%
2024 (est.)	3,702		−3.4%
U.S. Decennial Census

=== 2020 census ===
As of the 2020 census, Grayson had a population of 3,834. The median age was 35.8 years. 19.6% of residents were under the age of 18 and 18.6% of residents were 65 years of age or older. For every 100 females there were 98.5 males, and for every 100 females age 18 and over there were 97.9 males age 18 and over.

98.6% of residents lived in urban areas, while 1.4% lived in rural areas.

There were 1,469 households in Grayson, of which 28.5% had children under the age of 18 living in them. Of all households, 33.6% were married-couple households, 20.5% were households with a male householder and no spouse or partner present, and 39.5% were households with a female householder and no spouse or partner present. About 38.6% of all households were made up of individuals and 19.5% had someone living alone who was 65 years of age or older.

There were 1,696 housing units, of which 13.4% were vacant. The homeowner vacancy rate was 1.9% and the rental vacancy rate was 12.5%.

Racial composition as of the 2020 census
Race	Number	Percent
White	3,452	90.0%
Black or African American	177	4.6%
American Indian and Alaska Native	16	0.4%
Asian	26	0.7%
Native Hawaiian and Other Pacific Islander	0	0.0%
Some other race	33	0.9%
Two or more races	130	3.4%
Hispanic or Latino (of any race)	88	2.3%

=== 2000 census ===
As of the census of 2000, there were 3,877 people, 1,415 households, and 938 families residing in the city. The population density was 1,549.1 inhabitants per square mile (598.1/km^{2}). There were 1,538 housing units at an average density of 614.5 per square mile (237.3/km^{2}). The racial makeup of the city was 98.32% White, 0.52% African American, 0.39% Native American, 0.28% Asian, 0.03% Pacific Islander, 0.18% from other races, and 0.28% from two or more races. Hispanic or Latino of any race were 0.77% of the population.

There were 1,415 households, out of which 31.0% had children under the age of 18 living with them, 46.9% were married couples living together, 16.0% had a female householder with no husband present, and 33.7% were non-families. 31.0% of all households were made up of individuals, and 13.1% had someone living alone who was 65 years of age or older. The average household size was 2.31 and the average family size was 2.86.

In the city the population was spread out, with 21.9% under the age of 18, 19.0% from 18 to 24, 24.3% from 25 to 44, 18.5% from 45 to 64, and 16.3% who were 65 years of age or older. The median age was 32 years. For every 100 females, there were 83.0 males. For every 100 females age 18 and over, there were 78.0 males.

The median income for a household in the city was $19,683, and the median income for a family was $26,280. Males had a median income of $32,022 versus $18,875 for females. The per capita income for the city was $11,879. About 27.7% of families and 31.4% of the population were below the poverty line, including 44.8% of those under age 18 and 22.3% of those age 65 or over.

== Economy ==
=== Muskie Data Campus ===
In May 2026, TeraWulf announced it will purchase the approximate 285-acre, Muskie Data Campus, located in Grayson, in the EastPark Industrial Park, which is the marketing name for the Northeast Kentucky Regional Industrial Park Authority's site, created by the Boyd, Carter, Elliott, Greenup and Lawrence County governments. The Muskie Data Campus lies within the 1,000-acre EastPark Industrial Park, and is being redeveloped by TeraWulf, and which is planned to support more than 1 gigawatt of data center capacity.
TeraWulf has agreed to provide $100 million in residential winter bill credits across eastern Kentucky beginning in 2029, and has agreed to pay the estimated financing costs associated with construction of Kentucky Power's planned 760-MW combined-cycle generation facility at the Big Sandy Plant site.

== Notable residents ==
- Charlie Borders, former Kentucky State Senator
- Montana Fouts, All American softball pitcher for University of Alabama
- Jason Smith, chef, TV personality
- Robin L. Webb, Kentucky State Senator and former Kentucky State Representative
- Jill York, former member of the Kentucky House of Representatives

== See also ==
- 1993 East Carter High School shooting, a school shooting that occurred in Grayson
