= Greenup County, Kentucky =

County in Kentucky, United States

- County
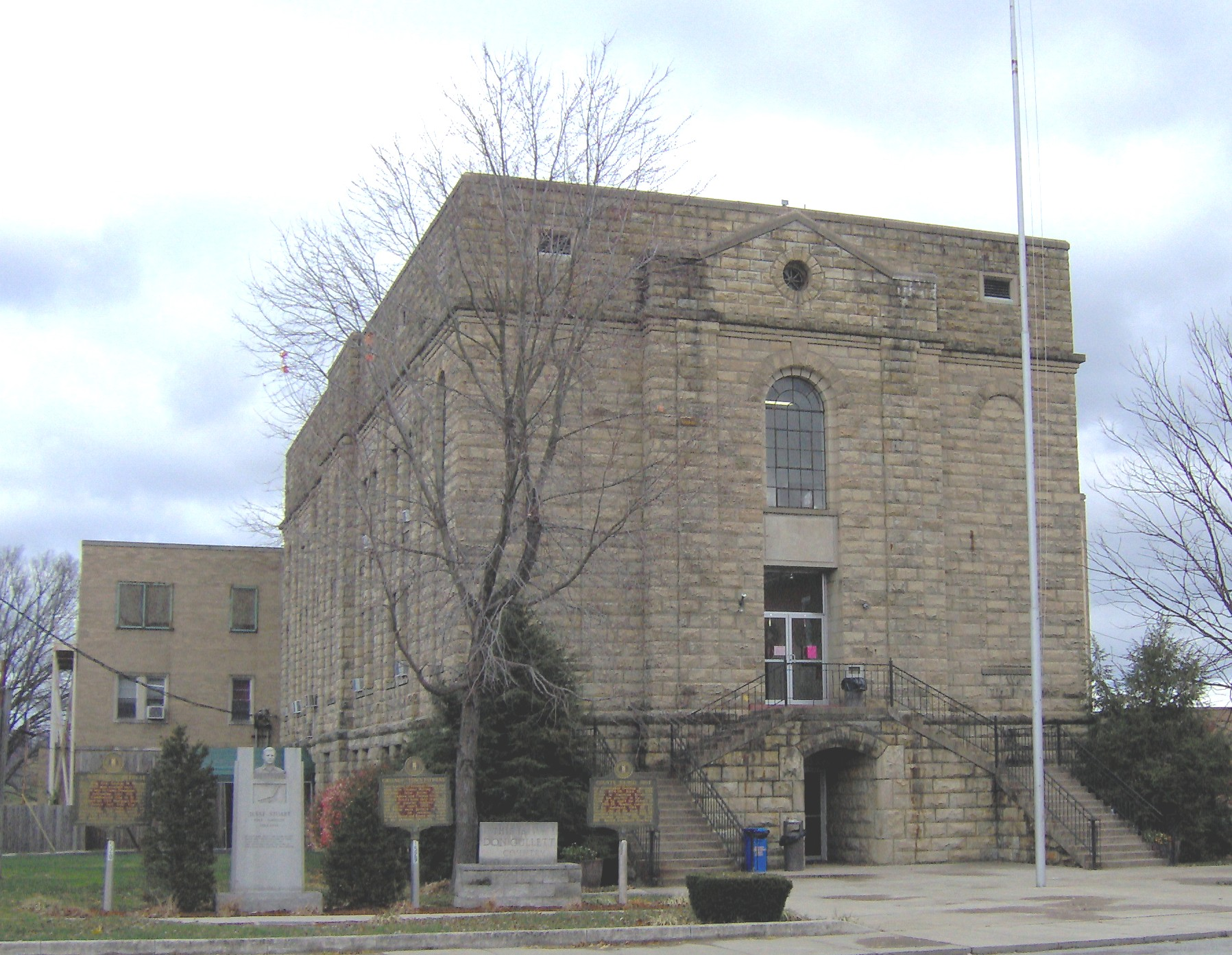
- Greenup County courthouse in Greenup

- Location within the U.S. state of Kentucky
- Coordinates: 38°32′N 82°55′W
- Country: United States
- State: Kentucky
- Founded: 1803
- Named for: Christopher Greenup
- Seat: Greenup
- Largest city: Flatwoods

Government
  - Judge/Executive: Bobby Hall (R)

Area
  - Total: 354 sq mi (920 km^{2})
  - Land: 344 sq mi (890 km^{2})
  - Water: 10 sq mi (26 km^{2}) 2.8%

Population (2020)
  - Total: 35,962
  - Estimate (2025): 35,213 ▼
  - Density: 105/sq mi (40.4/km^{2})
- Time zone: UTC−5 (Eastern)
  - Summer (DST): UTC−4 (EDT)
- Congressional district: 4th
- Website: www.greenupcountyky.gov

Greenup County is a county located along the Ohio River in the northeastern part of the U.S. state of Kentucky. As of the 2020 census, the population was 35,962. The county was founded in 1803 and named in honor of Christopher Greenup. Its county seat is Greenup. Greenup County is part of the Huntington-Ashland, WV-KY-OH Metropolitan Statistical Area.

== History ==
Located with its northern border formed by the Ohio River, Greenup County was organized by an act of the General Assembly of Kentucky on December 12, 1803, from Mason County, which included the majority of eastern Kentucky at the time.

Three courthouses have served Greenup County. The first courthouse, built of logs, was replaced by a brick structure in 1811.

== Geography ==
According to the United States Census Bureau, the county has a total area of 354 square miles (920 km^{2}), of which 344 square miles (890 km^{2}) is land and 10 square miles (26 km^{2}) (2.8%) is water.

=== Features ===
Like most eastern Kentucky counties, Greenup County is predominantly made up of rolling hills and valleys. The land in the Ohio River valley is generally flat and mostly populated by industry, commerce and residential development. Beyond this the land gives way to a series of hills and valleys that are representative of the foothills of the Appalachian Mountains. It is relatively sparsely inhabited by farmers. Among these hills, popular fishing spots can be found among the Little Sandy River, Greenbo Lake, and Tygarts Creek. Greenup County's land is still predominantly covered by forest with minimal clear cutting of the old forests.

The soil has long supported a healthy agriculture and livestock industry. Traditionally, this has meant a sizeable tobacco base and cattle ranching. Since the late 20th century, as traditional agriculture products have been dominated by industrial-scale agri-corporations, growth has been seen in non-traditional products such as American Quarter Horses, ostriches, and marijuana.

=== Major highways ===
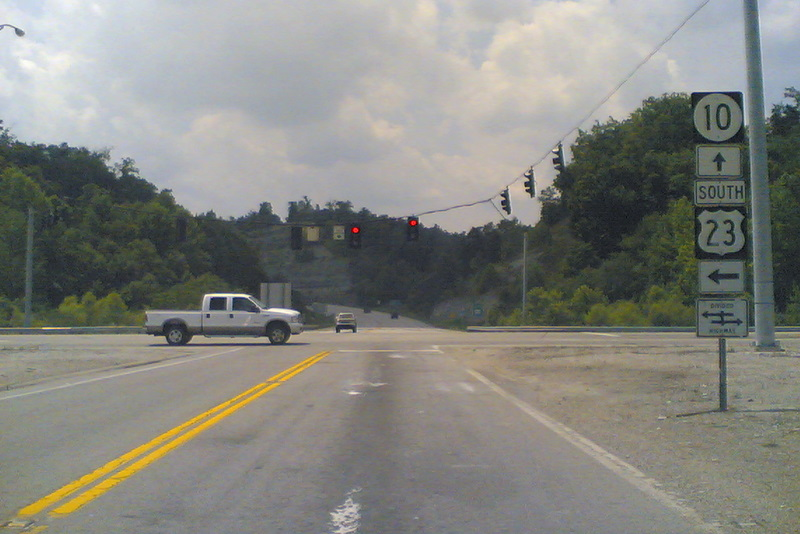
A view of the intersection of U.S. 23, KY 10, & Ohio SR 253 just after crossing the Jesse Stuart Memorial Bridge in Greenup

U.S. Highway 23 is the primary route for travel through Greenup County. It enters Greenup County at the southeasternmost point and follows the Ohio River north along the eastern border passing through Russell, Flatwoods, Raceland, Wurtland, Greenup and South Shore. It then exits just west of South Shore crossing the Ohio River via the U.S. Grant Bridge into Portsmouth, Ohio and continuing north towards Columbus, Ohio.

The AA Highway begins at U.S. Highway 23 and connects to U.S. Highway 52 in Ohio via the Jesse Stuart Memorial Bridge. The AA Highway (also known as Route 10) runs west intersecting Route 7 and eventually exiting west into Lewis County. Since its completion in 1995, the AA Highway has allowed Northeastern Kentucky residents to more easily travel to Maysville, Kentucky as well as Northern Kentucky and Cincinnati, Ohio.

The northern terminus of the Industrial Parkway (Kentucky Route 67) ends at U.S. Highway 23 at Wurtland. This highway serves to connect Wurtland and the surrounding towns of Greenup, Flatwoods and the unincorporated area of Argillite to the EastPark industrial park and Interstate 64 in Carter County.

=== Adjacent counties ===
- Boyd County (southeast)
- Carter County (southwest)
- Lewis County (west)
- Scioto County, Ohio (north)
- Lawrence County, Ohio (east)

== Demographics ==
Historical population
Census	Pop.	Note	%±
1810	2,369		—
1820	4,311		82.0%
1830	5,852		35.7%
1840	6,297		7.6%
1850	9,654		53.3%
1860	8,760		−9.3%
1870	11,463		30.9%
1880	13,371		16.6%
1890	11,911		−10.9%
1900	15,432		29.6%
1910	18,475		19.7%
1920	20,062		8.6%
1930	24,554		22.4%
1940	24,971		1.7%
1950	24,887		−0.3%
1960	29,238		17.5%
1970	33,192		13.5%
1980	39,132		17.9%
1990	36,742		−6.1%
2000	36,891		0.4%
2010	36,910		0.1%
2020	35,962		−2.6%
2025 (est.)	35,213	▼	−2.1%
U.S. Decennial Census; 1790-1960 1900-1990; 1990-2000 2010-2020

=== 2020 census ===
As of the 2020 census, the county had a population of 35,962. The median age was 43.9 years. 22.2% of residents were under the age of 18 and 21.2% of residents were 65 years of age or older. For every 100 females there were 94.5 males, and for every 100 females age 18 and over there were 91.4 males age 18 and over.

The racial makeup of the county was 94.8% White, 0.6% Black or African American, 0.2% American Indian and Alaska Native, 0.6% Asian, 0.0% Native Hawaiian and Pacific Islander, 0.4% from some other race, and 3.3% from two or more races. Hispanic or Latino residents of any race comprised 0.9% of the population.

57.3% of residents lived in urban areas, while 42.7% lived in rural areas.

There were 14,430 households in the county, of which 29.5% had children under the age of 18 living with them and 26.3% had a female householder with no spouse or partner present. About 26.3% of all households were made up of individuals and 13.4% had someone living alone who was 65 years of age or older.

There were 16,235 housing units, of which 11.1% were vacant. Among occupied housing units, 76.6% were owner-occupied and 23.4% were renter-occupied. The homeowner vacancy rate was 1.8% and the rental vacancy rate was 9.3%.

=== 2000 census ===
As of the census of 2000, there were 36,891 people, 14,536 households, and 11,032 families residing in the county. The population density was 107 per square mile (41/km^{2}). There were 15,977 housing units at an average density of 46 per square mile (18/km^{2}). The racial makeup of the county was 98.07% White, 0.57% Black or African American, 0.19% Native American, 0.38% Asian, 0.15% from other races, and 0.64% from two or more races. 0.55% of the population were Hispanic or Latino of any race.

There were 14,536 households, out of which 32.00% had children under the age of 18 living with them, 62.30% were married couples living together, 10.40% had a female householder with no husband present, and 24.10% were non-families. 21.70% of all households were made up of individuals, and 10.00% had someone living alone who was 65 years of age or older. The average household size was 2.51 and the average family size was 2.91.

In the county, the population was spread out, with 23.60% under the age of 18, 7.90% from 18 to 24, 27.90% from 25 to 44, 26.00% from 45 to 64, and 14.60% who were 65 years of age or older. The median age was 39 years. For every 100 females there were 92.80 males. For every 100 females age 18 and over, there were 89.30 males.

The median income for a household in the county was $32,142, and the median income for a family was $38,928. Males had a median income of $35,475 versus $21,198 for females. The per capita income for the county was $17,137. About 11.60% of families and 14.10% of the population were below the poverty line, including 18.60% of those under age 18 and 9.90% of those age 65 or over.

== Politics ==
United States presidential election results for Greenup County, Kentucky
Year	Republican		Democratic		Third party(ies)	
Year	No.	%	No.	%	No.	%
1912	923	28.60%	1,172	36.32%	1,132	35.08%
1916	1,821	48.37%	1,820	48.34%	124	3.29%
1920	3,111	52.17%	2,754	46.18%	98	1.64%
1924	2,510	47.30%	1,932	36.41%	864	16.28%
1928	4,410	64.43%	2,435	35.57%	0	0.00%
1932	3,422	40.30%	4,963	58.44%	107	1.26%
1936	3,973	45.88%	4,686	54.12%	0	0.00%
1940	4,059	45.99%	4,742	53.73%	24	0.27%
1944	3,718	49.30%	3,821	50.66%	3	0.04%
1948	3,168	42.48%	4,186	56.13%	104	1.39%
1952	4,354	47.96%	4,716	51.95%	8	0.09%
1956	5,464	51.85%	5,045	47.87%	29	0.28%
1960	6,101	53.77%	5,245	46.23%	0	0.00%
1964	4,045	37.58%	6,680	62.06%	39	0.36%
1968	4,698	43.68%	4,689	43.60%	1,368	12.72%
1972	6,828	59.70%	4,491	39.27%	118	1.03%
1976	5,062	42.14%	6,880	57.27%	71	0.59%
1980	6,857	48.04%	7,126	49.92%	292	2.05%
1984	7,451	51.52%	6,923	47.87%	88	0.61%
1988	6,559	48.38%	6,956	51.31%	43	0.32%
1992	4,975	34.52%	7,214	50.05%	2,225	15.44%
1996	5,370	38.48%	6,883	49.32%	1,703	12.20%
2000	7,233	49.33%	7,164	48.86%	266	1.81%
2004	8,696	52.91%	7,630	46.43%	109	0.66%
2008	8,849	56.01%	6,621	41.91%	328	2.08%
2012	8,855	58.38%	6,027	39.73%	286	1.89%
2016	11,546	70.93%	4,146	25.47%	585	3.59%
2020	13,064	71.88%	4,873	26.81%	239	1.31%
2024	12,961	74.60%	4,181	24.06%	232	1.34%

=== Elected officials ===
==== State and Federal ====
Elected officials as of May 30, 2025
U.S. House	Thomas Massie (R)	KY 4
Ky. Senate	Robin L. Webb (R)	18
Ky. House	Aaron Thompson (R)	98

==== County ====
Elected officials as of January 2, 2023
Judge/Executive	Bobby Hall (R)
Commissioner District 1	Derrick Bradley (R)
Commissioner District 2	Lee Wireman (R)
Commissioner District 3	Earnie Duty II (R)
Clerk	Andrew Imel (R)
Attorney	Matthew Warnock (R)
Jailer	Larry Pancake (R)
Coroner	Neil Wright (R)
Surveyor	Richard Howerton
Property Value Admin.	Tony D. Quillen (R)
Sheriff	Matt Smith (R)

==== Judicial ====
Elected officials as of January 6, 2025
Commonwealth's Attorney	Rhese David McKenzie (R)
Circuit Court Clerk	Allen Reed (D)
20th Circuit, 1st division	Brian C. McCloud
20th Circuit, 2nd division family court	Jeffrey L. Preston
20th District	Paul Craft

== Education ==
=== Public school districts ===
- Greenup County School District serves the cities of Greenup, Wurtland, South Shore and rural Greenup County.
- Russell Independent School District serves the cities of Russell, Flatwoods and Bellefonte.
- Raceland-Worthington Independent School District serves the cities of Raceland and Worthington.

=== Library ===
The Greenup County Public Library serves the county with three locations. The main library is located in Greenup and branch libraries are located in Flatwoods and just outside of South Shore (McKell branch). The library also operates two bookmobiles that provide services in areas of the county not able to be served by the three libraries.

== Communities ==
=== Cities ===
- Bellefonte
- Flatwoods
- Greenup (county seat)
- Raceland
- Russell
- South Shore
- Worthington
- Wurtland

=== Unincorporated communities ===
- Lloyd
- South Portsmouth
- Frost
- Limeville

== Places of interest ==
- EastPark
- Greenbo Lake State Resort Park
- Raceland Race Course

== Alcohol sales ==
Greenup County is a wet county, meaning that sale of alcohol in the county is prohibited except in certain areas as voted on by the residents of the area, including at least one area where full retail sales are permitted. In the case of Greenup County, alcohol sales are permitted in the following areas:

- The city of Russell has allowed the full retail sale of alcohol since 2014 after allowing, since 2008, by the drink alcohol sales at restaurants which seat at least 100 diners and derive at least 70% of their total sales from food.
- The cities of Greenup, Raceland and South Shore allow full retail sale of alcohol after voters approved local option petitions in 2020.
- The city of Flatwoods allows full retail sale of alcohol after voters approved a local option petition in 2024.
- The city of Bellefonte has allowed the full retail sale of alcohol since 2017 after allowing, since 2009, the Bellefonte Country Club to sell alcohol by the drink under a provision that allows voters of an otherwise dry precinct to allow alcohol sales at a specific, voter approved, USGA regulation golf course. The status change had no practical effect within the city itself as restaurants (other than the Bellefonte Country Club), liquor stores, gas stations, grocery stores and other businesses that generally sell alcohol are, by local ordinance, prohibited within the city limits of Bellefonte. The change in status allowed the Bellefonte Country Club to receive a "caterer's license" to serve alcohol by the drink at private offsite events, which was not permitted under the previous alcohol status.
- The Hunnewell election precinct in unincorporated Greenup County approved a petition in 2020 allowing the River Bend Golf Course to sell alcohol by the drink under a provision that allows voters of an otherwise dry precinct to allow alcohol sales at a specific, voter approved, USGA regulation golf course.

The sale of alcohol is prohibited in the cities of Worthington, Wurtland and in all areas of unincorporated Greenup County outside the River Bend Golf Course.

== Notable people ==
- Billy Ray Cyrus – singer/actor, son of Ron Cyrus and father of Miley Cyrus
- Ron Cyrus – politician
- Don Gullett – Major League Baseball pitcher
- Herb Roe – mural artist
- John Stephenson – Major League Baseball Catcher
- Jesse Stuart – Kentucky Poet Laureate
- Clint "Hawk" Thomas – baseball player for the New York Black Yankees of the Negro leagues
- Richard Whitt - Newspaper journalist, (The Courier-Journal), 1978 Pulitzer Prize for his reporting on the fire at the Beverly Hills Supper Club fire in Southgate, Kentucky.

== See also ==
- National Register of Historic Places listings in Greenup County, Kentucky
