= Smith Creek =

Smith Creek, Smiths Creek or Smith's Creek may refer to:

== Streams ==
=== United States ===
One of at least 417 streams in the United States named "Smith's Creek" or "Smith Creek" (see USGS source below), including:

- Smith Creek (San Tomas Aquino Creek tributary), a tributary of San Tomas Aquino Creek, in Santa Clara County, California
- Smith Creek (Arroyo Hondo tributary), a tributary of Arroyo Hondo in Santa Clara County, California
- Smith Creek (Chattahoochee River), a tributary to the Chattahoochee River in northern Georgia
- Smith Creek (Iowa River), a river in Iowa
- Smith Creek (Missouri River), a river in Missouri
- Smith Creek (Nebraska), a river in Jefferson County
- Smith Creek (Lander County, Nevada), a stream in Nevada
- Smiths Creek (Deep River tributary), a stream in Lee County, North Carolina
- Smith Creek (Crow Creek), a stream in South Dakota
- Smith Creek (Virginia), a tributary of the North Fork of the Shenandoah River
- Smith Creek (Coal River), a stream in West Virginia
- Smith Creek (Guyandotte River), a stream in Cabell County, West Virginia

=== Elsewhere ===
- Smiths Creek (New South Wales), a stream in Sydney

== Communities in the United States ==
- Smiths Creek, Kentucky, an unincorporated community in Carter County
- Smith's Creek, Michigan, a civil township in St. Clair County
