= National Register of Historic Places listings in Carter County, Kentucky =

Location of Carter County in Kentucky

This is a list of the National Register of Historic Places listings in Carter County, Kentucky.

This is intended to be a complete list of the properties on the National Register of Historic Places in Carter County, Kentucky, United States. The locations of National Register properties for which the latitude and longitude coordinates are included below, may be seen in a map.

There are 4 properties listed on the National Register in the county.

This National Park Service list is complete through NPS recent listings posted May 2, 2025.

== Current listings ==
	Name on the Register	Image	Date listed	Location	City or town	Description
1	Carter Caves Pictograph (15CR60)		September 8, 1989 (#89001178)	Address Restricted	Olive Hill	
2	Van Kitchen House		May 2, 1974 (#74000857)	South of Grayson off Kentucky Route 7; 38°14′15″N 82°59′32″W	Grayson	
3	Olive Hill C & O Depot	Olive Hill C & O Depot	October 29, 1992 (#92001487)	Southern side of Railroad St., west of the junction with Plum St. 38°17′59″N 83°10′31″W	Olive Hill	
4	Saltpeter Cave	Saltpeter Cave	July 24, 2001 (#01000743)	Carter Caves State Resort Park; 38°22′35″N 83°07′26″W	Olive Hill	

== Former listing ==
	Name on the Register	Image	Date listed	Date removed	Location	City or town	Description
1	Sellers House and Laboratory Building		October 16, 1974 (#74002274)	December 13, 1974	S of Grahn	Grahn	House was destroyed by fire a month after listing on the Register in 1974. The laboratory was dismantled in 1976 and relocated to the New England Air Museum storage. In 1979, the museum was heavily damaged by a tornado, including most of the laboratory remnants.

== See also ==
- List of National Historic Landmarks in Kentucky
- National Register of Historic Places listings in Kentucky
