= Norton Branch =

Norton Branch may refer to:

- Norton Branch (Kentucky), a stream
- Norton Branch, Kentucky, an unincorporated community
