= Matthew Bacon Sellers Jr. =

American aviation pioneer

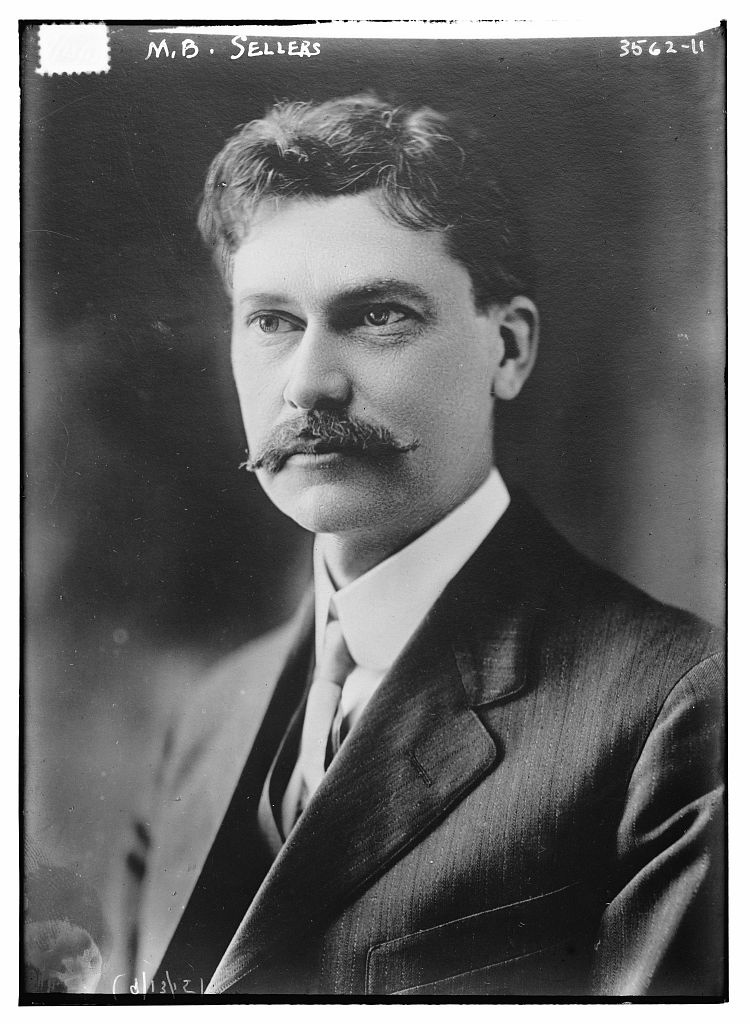
- Born: March 29, 1869; Baltimore, Maryland, US
- Died: April 5, 1932 (aged 63); Ardsley-on-Hudson, New York, US
- Known for: Work in Field of Aviation
- Spouse: Ethel Clark
- Aviation career
- First flight: 1908; Sellers Quadruplane
- Famous flights: Piloted the first aircraft to take off and land in Kentucky

Matthew Bacon Sellers Jr. (March 29, 1869 – April 5, 1932) was a United States inventor and scientist known for pioneering work with airplanes. Sellers was the son of a prosperous Baltimore merchant family originally from Kentucky. He attended Harvard University and showed an early interest in the burgeoning field of aviation. Only 5 years after the historic Wright Brothers flight, he built and flew his own airplane, making such innovations as the first patent on retractable landing gear, and an ultra-lightweight design. He contributed to scientific papers and was on a founding federal body that eventually became NASA.

After a series of personal misfortunes and accidents, and a relatively early death, by the 1930s he largely disappeared from public view. His work was rediscovered in the 1970s, and today he has holdings in the Smithsonian Museum, and has been called Kentucky's version of the Wright Brothers. In 1908, he built and flew the first airplane in Kentucky.

== Biography ==
Sellers Jr. was born on March 29, 1869, at Sellers Mansion in Baltimore, Maryland. His father Matthew Bacon Sellers Sr. (1800–1880) had been a plantation owner in Louisiana who sold his holdings after the Civil War and moved to Baltimore, where he built the prestigious namesake mansion on Lafayette Square, using the proceeds from the Louisiana properties. Sellers Sr. was a prosperous citizen of Baltimore and became the President of the Northern Central Railway. Both Sellers Sr. and his second wife Angelina (1842–1913) were originally from Carter County, Kentucky. In 1888, Angelina purchased rural mountain land once owned by her family near Grahn, Kentucky, and named it "Blakemore". Sellers Jr. would later build a large farm house in the rural and mountainous area, continuing to live in Baltimore as his primary residence until 1918, and traveling to Kentucky on occasion.

As a teenager Sellers was schooled in Göttingen, Germany and Évreux, France. He attended Harvard University, receiving a law degree in 1892. For two years after Harvard, he studied chemistry, physics and mechanical arts at Lawrence Scientific School of Harvard University and Drexel Institute. His interests were patent law, which he practiced in Baltimore and New York City, and the emerging science of aeronautics. From an early age, Sellers showed an interest in hot air balloons, kites, and mechanical birds. It was on his Kentucky farm that he began aviation experiments in earnest.

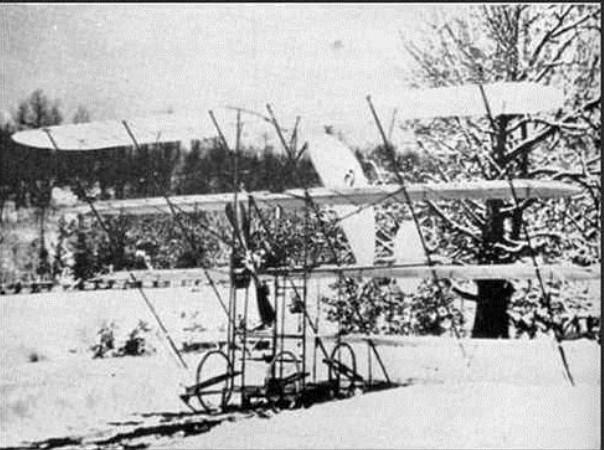
Sellers' 1908 Quadraplane

In 1903, the same year the Wright Brothers made their historic first flight, Sellers was the first to determine the lift and drift of arched surfaces, by means of a wind tunnel he built himself. The tunnel required electricity, and he was the first to generate it in that part of Kentucky. He built a Lilienthal model glider, but it was hard to balance. He further experimented with a staggered quadruplane hang glider in 1905 - like a biplane but with four wings instead of two. Each wing was staggered behind, and 2 feet (61 cm) below the one above. These types of machines were called "step gliders". By 1907, he was building and flying full-size gliders. In 1908, in Carter County, Kentucky, he added a small motor, and on December 28 made a successful first flight. This machine was credited as being the lightest airplane in the world flying with the least horsepower. It was capable of flight on only 5 hp. It was the first motorized airplane to be built in Kentucky. It included the first retractable wheels on an airplane. During test flights in 1911, his assistant and friend Lincoln Binion was "practically decapitated" when his head was struck by a propeller.

After the accident with Binion, the grief-stricken Sellers left Kentucky. As he was considered a leading authority on aerodynamics, President Taft appointed him to the National Aerodynamical Laboratory Commission in 1912, although he didn't serve long because legislation to create the commission was defeated in January 1913. Nevertheless, out of this came the eventual foundation of NASA. In 1915, President Wilson, on the recommendation of the Secretary of the Navy, Josephus Daniels, appointed Sellers to serve as one of two representatives of the Aeronautical Society of America on the newly formed Naval Consulting Board. He was awarded numerous patents on various aeronautical prototypes and improvements. Sellers was the technical editor of the journal Aeronautics, the countries leading publication on airplanes, and authored over 30 articles on aerodynamics.

Sellers also spent time in Georgia, North Carolina, and eventually settled in Ardsley-on-Hudson, New York, where he married Ethel Clark in 1918 at age 49, she was many years younger. They had two boys. In 1914, Sellers suffered a serious accident while flying the quadruplane in Staten Island, and almost lost an arm; he did not fly his own planes after that instead employing a test pilot. In 1926, the last airplane he built caught fire and was destroyed when gasoline leaked onto the fuselage, he would not make another. By this time the cutting edge of aircraft design was maturing into an industry, and the pioneering days of experimental machines by one designer/builder/flyer were passing. In 1929, the fortune he inherited from his father was mostly lost, in the Crash of '29. It adversely impacted his health and outlook on life.

Misfortune continued to follow Sellers – while visiting friends in Larchmont, New York, in early 1932, he became ill after exposure to a cold wind from Long Island Sound. Confined to bed at Ardsley-on-Hudson, with pneumonia, he nearly recovered when he suddenly died on April 5, 1932, of a pulmonary embolism. His children were Matthew Bacon Sellers III (1919–2003) who was a Navy Commander in the Pacific Theater of WWII, earning 14 battle stars in engagements such as Midway and Guadalcanal; and John Clark Sellers (1921–2008) who also served in the Navy during WWII and reached the rank of Lt. Commander during the war.

In 1967, aviation historian Edward Peck learned of Sellers achievements and began collecting artifacts, documents, photos, and oral histories. Blakemore burned in 1974 during restoration, and his work shop that survived the fire was destroyed by a tornado in 1979 while in storage at the New England Air Museum. In 1974, the Kentucky Olive Hill Airport was renamed Sellers Field. In 1976, the Carter County Vocational School built a full-size replica of the quadruplane which is now hanging at the Aviation Museum of Kentucky. An airplane control bar from the quadruplane was donated to the Smithsonian Air and Space Museum, where it is sometimes on display, along with other physical and written artifacts from Sellers. On March 29, 2008, the State of Kentucky read a Resolution declaring that day as the "Matthew B. Sellers II Day". A roadside historical plaque in Carter County Kentucky is dedicated to Sellers.

== Patents ==
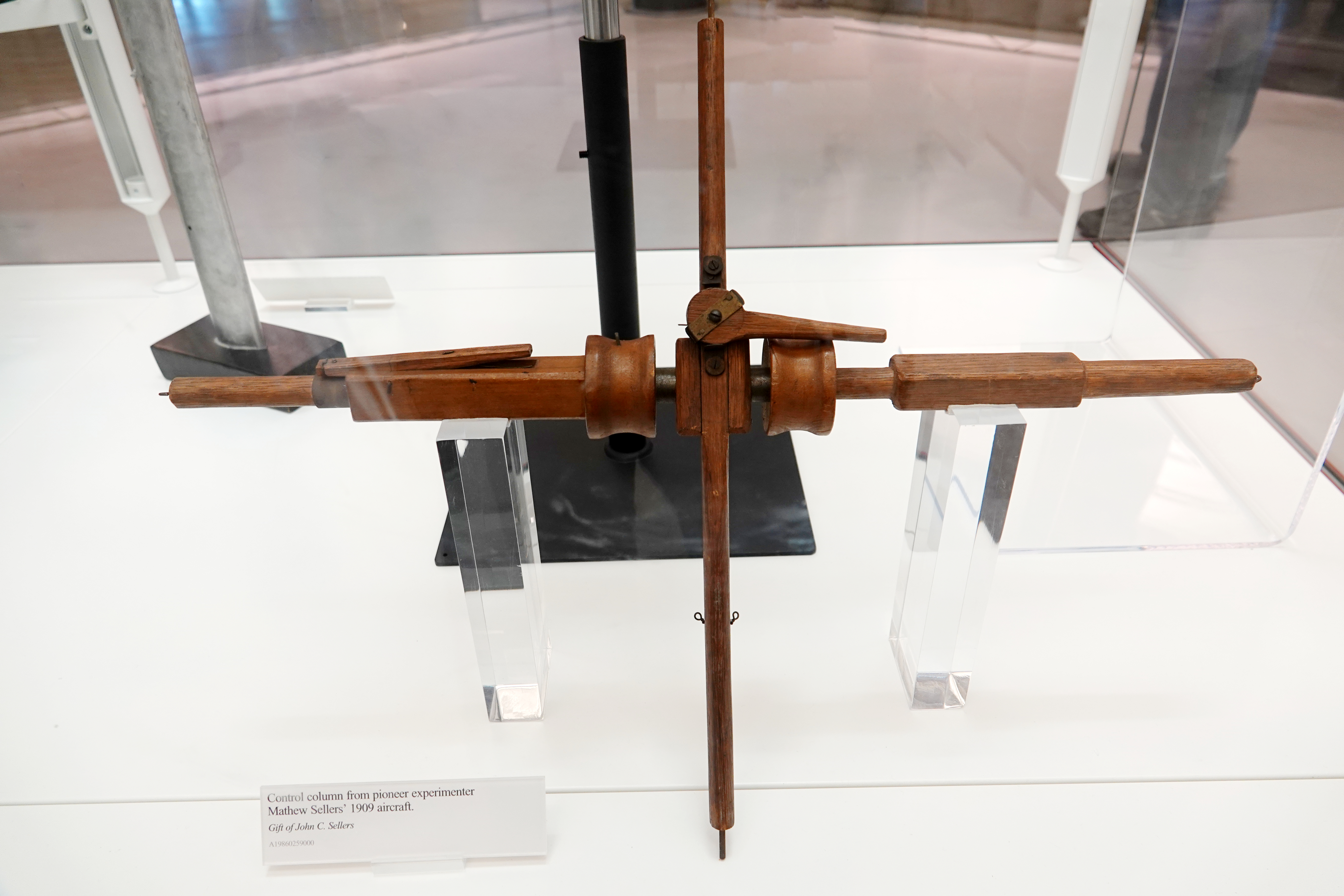
Sellers airplane control column on display at the National Air and Space Museum

Sellers obtained five US patents:

- Aerial apparatus, US886159A Priority 1907-07-24 • Filed 1907-07-24 • Granted 1908-04-28 • Published 1908-04-28
- Flying-machine, US927289A Priority 1908-01-31 • Filed 1908-01-31 • Granted 1909-07-06 • Published 1909-07-06
- Aerial navigation, US997860A Priority 1909-04-28 • Filed 1909-04-28 • Granted 1911-07-11 • Published 1911-07-11
- Aerial navigation, US1096129A Priority 1912-08-08 • Filed 1912-08-08 • Granted 1914-05-12 • Published 1914-05-12
- Aerial navigation, US US1096130A Priority 1912-08-08 • Filed 1913-02-19 • Granted 1914-05-12 • Published 1914-05-12
