= Tygart =

Tygart or Tygarts may refer to:

== In Kentucky ==
- Tygarts Creek
- Upper Tygart Elementary, a school in Carter County

== In West Virginia ==
- Tygart Creek in Wood County
- Tygart Junction, a ghost town in Barbour County
- Tygart Lake in Taylor County
- Tygart Lake State Park in Taylor County
- Tygart Valley
- Tygart Valley River (sometimes called Tygart River)
- Tygarts Valley High School in Randolph County
