= Augusta Fells Savage Institute of Visual Arts =

Public high school in Maryland, USA

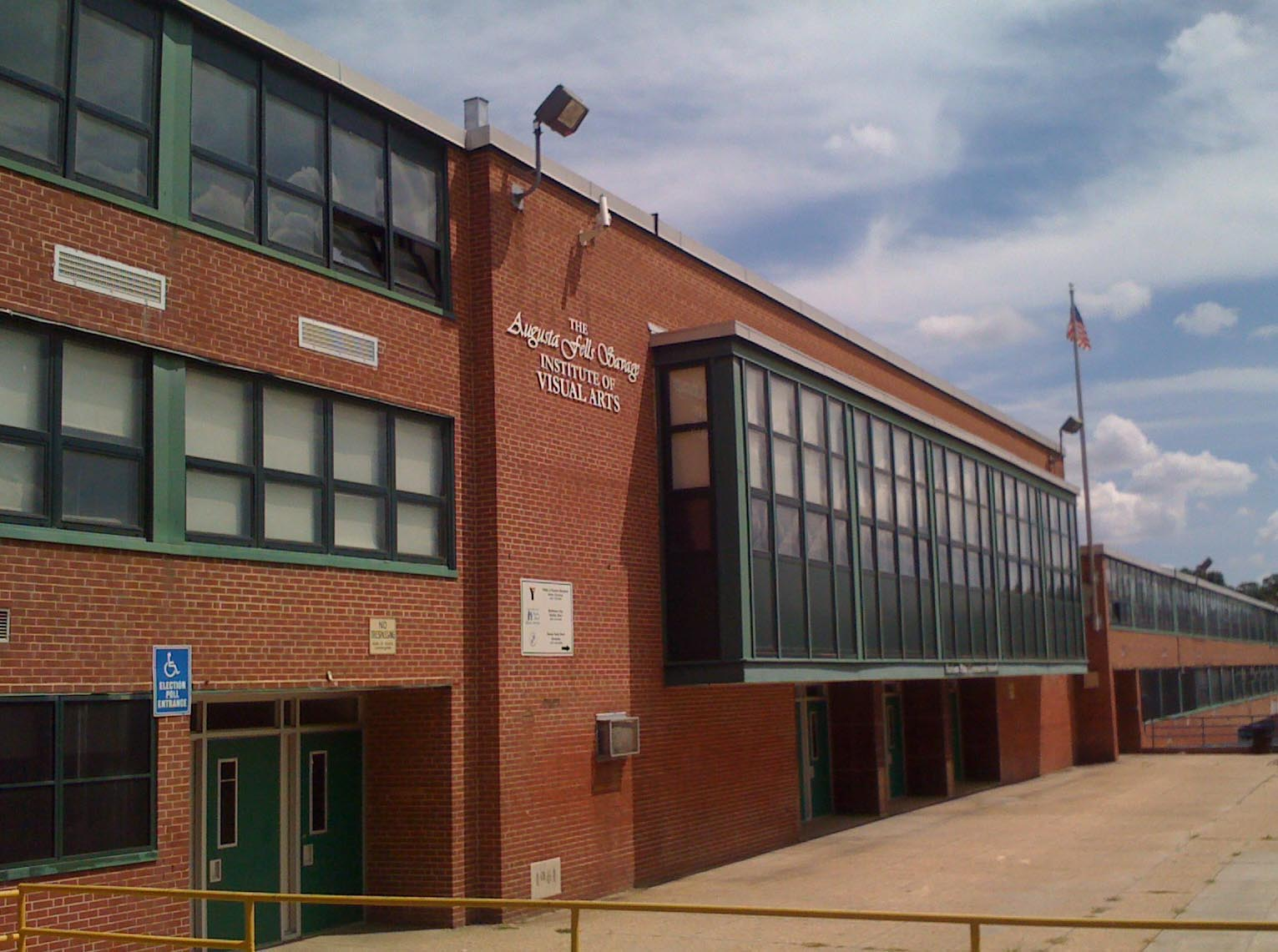

Location
- 1500 Harlem Ave; Baltimore, Maryland 21217; United States; 39°17′48″N 76°38′29″W

Information
- School type: Public
- Founded: 2004
- School district: Baltimore City Public Schools
- School number: 430
- Principal: Kamala Carnes
- Grades: 9–12
- Enrollment: 419 (2018)
- Area: Urban
- Team name: Sabers
- Website: City Schools Site

The Augusta Fells Savage Institute of Visual Arts (AFSIVA) is a public high school in Baltimore, Maryland, United States. It is named after Augusta Savage, a sculptor associated with the Harlem Renaissance. The school opened in 2004 within the former campus of Southwestern High School as part of a program intended to break up larger high schools in to smaller, more individualized schools. It graduated its first class in 2007.

== History ==
Initially created without a name, the school was named for Augusta Savage by the Baltimore school board in November 2005.

In January 2006, due to standardized test results, Augusta Fells Savage was identified as one of seven low-performing city schools that would require a "turnaround specialist" to assist the administration with increasing student achievement. A month later, the school board additionally proposed to move Augusta Fells Savage from its location in the former Southwestern High School complex to space within Calverton Middle School. By this time, Augusta Fells Savage shared the Southwestern campus with three other schools, with a total student population of 1,459. The school's principal would also be replaced with a new hire through the New Leaders program.

At community meetings following the proposal, the plan's call for mixing high school students with younger students was opposed by many parents over safety concerns. Community members also complained of lack of prior consultation for the plan, and enlisted the support of politicians including (then former) Congressman Kweisi Mfume in opposing its implementation. As a result, the board decided first to postpone their final decision and then ultimately scrapped the planned move to Calverton Middle altogether. Due to the desire to completely phase out the aging Southwestern complex where it resided, the school system still sought to find a new location for Augusta Fells Savage.

In January 2007, the school board recommended instead to relocate the school to the campus of Harlem Park Middle School instead, a site it would share with several other schools. The proposal, too, received criticism, this time from the principal of the Talent Development High School who predicted conflict between the combined groups of students, and who threatened to quit should the move take place. Another administrator of Talent Development wrote to The Baltimore Sun further arguing that the combination would cause trouble in the Harlem Park community due to the need for 600 to 700 additional students to commute into the neighborhood via bus every day. The predictions of disruption and trouble were rejected by Augusta Fells Savage's then-current principal, who argued the merger "could benefit students in both schools." In an op-ed, the editors of The Sun supported the proposal of the Talent Development High School administration, calling on the school board to extend the timeline to allow for consideration of alternative placement options. However, at the end of February, the city's school board approved the final plan to move Augusta Fells Savage to the former Harlem Park Middle building, described as "the most contentious issue" in a larger, city-wide consolidation of schools buildings.

In January 2024, Baltimore City Board of School Commissioners voted to combine the Bluford Drew Jemison STEM Academy West high school program with Augusta Fells at the end of the school year.

== Ghost student and grade inflation controversy and aftermath ==
In March 2021 Augusta Fells Savage made national headlines after a story about a student who failed 22 classes and missed 272 days of school went viral online. While the student had only a 0.13 GPA, he was listed as ranking 62 out of 120 students. The student who was in his senior year of high school would be sent back to 9th grade to restart high school from the beginning. Maryland Governor Larry Hogan ordered an investigation into the school following the national coverage staying that "....the report was "far worse than anything" he has "heard in the whole time" he has been governor." The report released by the department of education details that the school enrolled students in classes that did not exist, inflated grades, and reported false information in order to receive additional state funding for the school. Additionally, the principal and assistant principal were put on administrative leave in September 2019 (although as of March 2021, the district had paid them more than $365,000 in salary during the investigation); the investigation took 2 years; and no clear explanation on what the district did to assist students during the investigation was reported.

In 2023, a year after graduating only four seniors, the school celebrated 40 graduates at its first ever 'Decision Day'.
