= James L. Ridgely =

American lawyer and politician

James Lot Ridgely
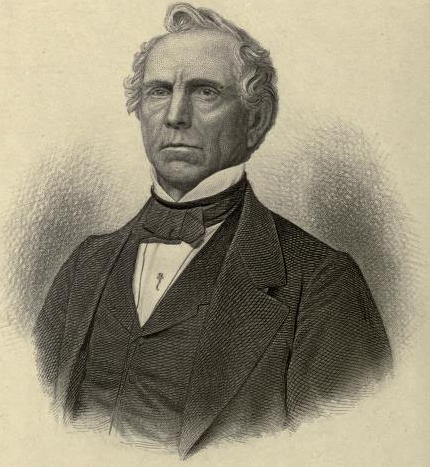
- Born: January 27, 1807; Baltimore, Maryland, U.S.
- Died: November 16, 1881 (aged 74); Baltimore, Maryland, U.S.
- Occupation: lawyer

James Lot Ridgely (January 27, 1807 – November 16, 1881) was an American lawyer and politician from Baltimore, Maryland, who has been called "the father of modern, ethical Odd Fellowship".

== Biography ==
Ridgely went to Mount St. Mary's College in Emmittsburg and pursued his judicial studies at the University of Maryland School of Law. He was admitted to the Baltimore Bar in 1828. He was elected to the Baltimore City Council in 1834 and 1835. Ridgely served a term in the Maryland House of Delegates in 1838. Later, he served two terms as the Baltimore County Register of Wills. Ridgely also represented Baltimore County as a member of the 1850 and 1864 Maryland Constitutional Conventions. During a portion of the Lincoln administration, Ridgely served as United States Collector of Internal Revenue.

From 1855 until his death, he served as president of the Baltimore County Mutual Fire Insurance Company and for several years as chairman of the Baltimore County Board of Education.

Ridgely married Anna Jane Jamison in 1828. She died in 1835, and Ridgely then married her sister, Esther P. Jamison, in 1836. They had three children.

== Leader in American Odd Fellowship ==
Ridgely joined the Odd Fellows at the age of 22 and rapidly rose in the organization. On September 5, 1831, he served as a representative for Maryland in the Grand Lodge of the United States’ annual session. In 1833, he was elected the grand secretary of the Grand Lodge of Maryland. In 1836 and 1840, Ridgely was elected to the position of Grand Sire, the highest position in the Order in the U.S. However, he declined the position after the 1840 election, but accepted the positions of grand corresponding secretary and grand recording secretary, both of which he would hold until his death.

Ridgely was sent as a delegate to the meeting of the order in Manchester, England, in 1842 and as a representative to the 1848 Grand Lodge of British North America's meeting in Montreal. During the 1840s, the American Independent Order of Odd Fellows (IOOF) would withdraw from the British Manchester Unity and develop its own distinct ritual, which would remain almost unchanged to the 1880s. This break and reform initiative was led by Ridgely. According to Ridgely, the Manchester Unity was "chiefly a life and health insurance company" while in the reformed American order "we find stirring appeals to the higher nature and those moral and divine principles which elevate it almost to the dignity of a religion." In 1855, Ridgely was delegated to visit lodges in British North America under the jurisdiction of the Grand Lodge of the U.S. According to Mark Tabbert, a large part of the IOOF's growth in membership and wealth in the late 19th century was due to Ridgely's leadership.

== Statue in Baltimore ==
A bronze statue of Ridgely was erected in Harlem Square Park, Baltimore, in 1885.

== Writings ==
- The Odd-fellows' Pocket Companion: A Correct Guide in All Matters Relating to Odd-fellowship (1867)
- History of American Odd Fellowship: The First Decade (1878)
