= Sellers Mansion =

Historic house in Maryland, United States

- U.S. National Register of Historic Places
- Baltimore City Landmark
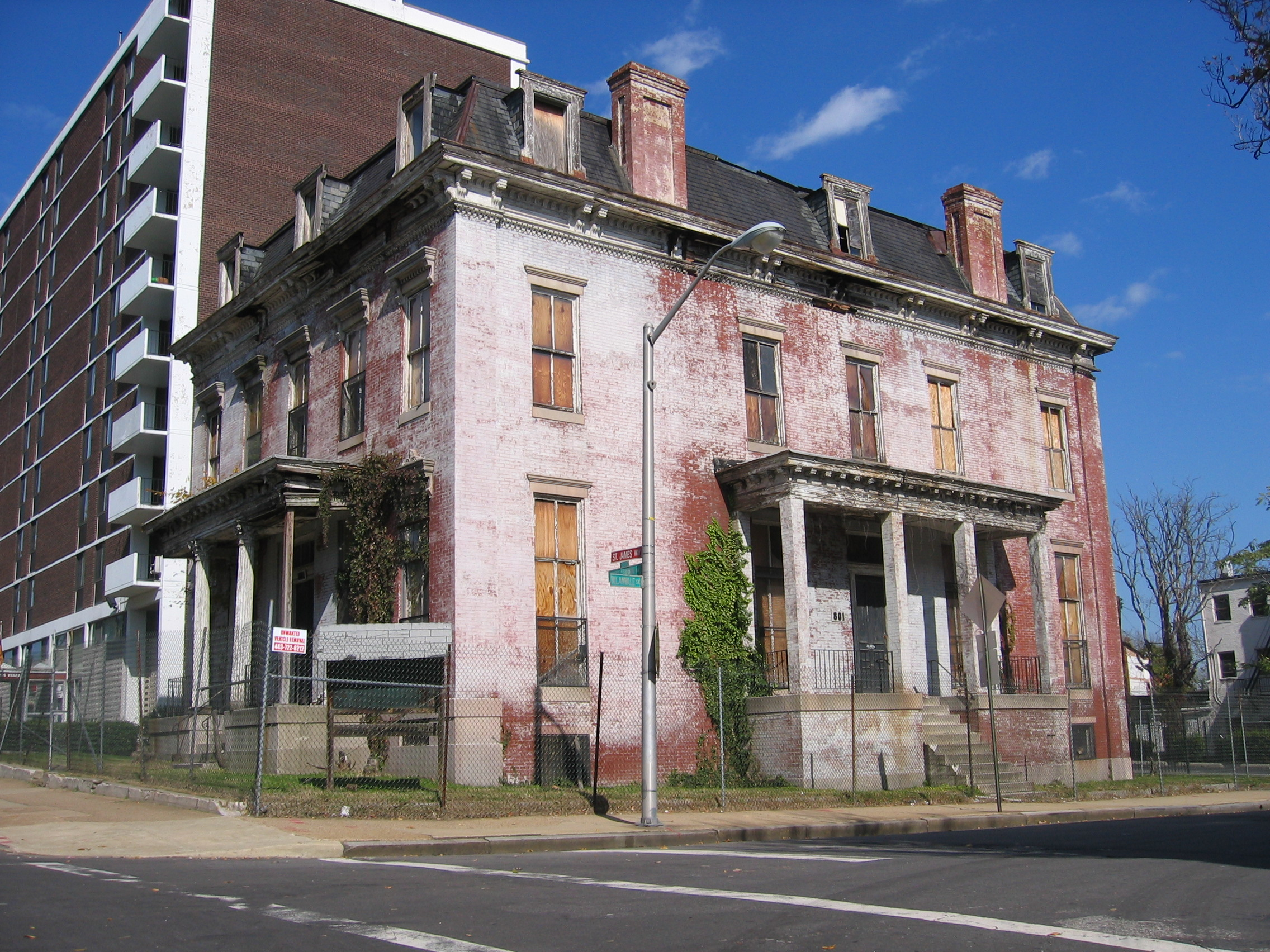
- Sellers Mansion, October 2009
- Interactive map of Sellers Mansion
- Location: 801 N. Arlington St., Baltimore, Maryland
- Coordinates: 39°17′53″N 76°38′10″W
- Area: less than one acre
- Built: 1868
- Architect: Davis, Edward
- Architectural style: Second Empire, Italianate
- Demolished: February 24, 2023
- NRHP reference No.: 01001369

Significant dates
- Added to NRHP: December 28, 2001
- Designated BCL: 2009

Sellers Mansion was a historic Victorian-era home located in Baltimore, Maryland, United States. It was a large three-story Italianate / Second Empire style brick structure located on Lafayette Square in the Harlem Park neighborhood. It was the birthplace and primary residence of aviation pioneer Matthew Bacon Sellers Jr. until 1918, and the headquarters of the community initiative Operation CHAMP from 1967 to 1980. By the early 1990s, the mansion became vacant and was deteriorating. It was listed on the U.S. National Register of Historic Places in 2001, plans for restoration never came to fruition. It was demolished by the city in 2023, after an unexplained fire.

== History ==
The mansion was constructed in 1868 by Edward Davis as the principal residence for Matthew Bacon Sellers Sr. (1800–1880) and his second wife, Angelina (Anne) Leathers Lewis Sellers (1842–1913). Sellers was a former slave owner from Louisiana who after the Civil War sold his holdings and moved to Baltimore. There he started a new career becoming President of the Northern Central Railway. In keeping with the grandeur of his southern plantation, Sellers bought an unusually large lot on the prestigious Lafayette Square in the Harlem Park neighborhood. Being on the square was a sign of privilege, and because row houses were the norm, the detached mansion set it apart. The recently constructed square was considered a premier location for the upper middle and professional classes. The mansion was the first parcel sold on the east side of the square, it was one of the most fashionable places to be in the city. Sellers Mansion was the birthplace of aviation pioneer Matthew Bacon Sellers Jr. (1869–1932), the son of Sellers Sr. and Angelina Sellers. He lived in the mansion until 1918.

Harlem Park transitioned to a black neighborhood by the 1920s. By the late-1950's, the area was abandoned by the middle class who fled the city for the suburbs, and the mansion and its environs suffered along with an increasingly destitute West Baltimore.

Samuel Sellers (1874–1954), and Annabel Sellers (1879–1953), the younger children of Sellers Sr., lived their entire lives at the mansion, and were never professionally employed, living off of their substantial inheritance. In their later years – from 1930 onward – they became reclusive, rarely leaving the premises, having food cooked and brought in by helpful black neighbors and taking occasional strolls in Lafayette Square. Despite their wealth they were virtually unknown in Baltimore social circles. They hoarded; according to a nephew, "the family never threw anything away". Annabel Sellers died in 1953 and Samuel Sellers followed less than a year later. Samuel was found in the house by a nephew, his body slumped in a chair clothed in a 20-year-old suit he wore consistently. The mansion was stocked with antiques, including stacks of Confederate money, and elaborate and costly European clothes, some never worn and in pristine condition. Bags of diamonds were found hidden in stacks of sheets. The house was sold at auction to speculators in March 1955 for $20,600, by the nephew, an eldest son of Sellers Jr.

After the auction, the mansion became the headquarters of the City Commission on Urban Renewal. In the late 1960s the home was threatened with demolition to make way for a parking lot for the St. James Terrace apartments. Other arrangements were made for parking and the mansion was restored and used as a community center. From 1967 to 1980, Operation CHAMP was run from the Sellers Mansion with three mobile units delivering games and playground equipment to neighborhoods across the city. These trucks took over city streets and turned them into pop-up playgrounds for a day. It was sponsored by Baltimore City Recreation and Parks with the support of federal funds. By the early 1990s, the mansion had become abandoned. Sellers Mansion was listed on the National Register of Historic Places in 2001. For a time, the property was owned by the St. James Episcopal Church, also on Lafayette Square. As of 2015, the mansion was owned by the nonprofit One House at a Time.

=== Destruction ===
Local developer Ernst Valery bought it out of receivership in late 2018 for $10,000, with the intention of converting it into 15 apartments for senior citizens. "We cleared the trash and fallen walls and stairs inside. We placed a temporary roof and completed an archeological dig," said Valery in 2019. He was publicly praised for his work to stabilize the deteriorating structure. However, Valery later said he could not restore the property to historic guideline specifications because it would be too costly to accommodate the many historic agency requirements, while balancing the needs to make it commercially viable. There was a small fire in 2021 caused by lightening, which the mansion survived; however, a second larger fire in 2023 led to the mansion being demolished, on February 24, 2023. The structure was still standing, the walls were two-feet thick, but the city quickly tore it down while still smoking hot. While officials initially stated the cause of the fire was under investigation, no official determination has ever been publicly released. A pattern of abuse was noted by a local architect, "This just keeps on happening. A developer or builder makes a nice computer model and gets permission to build. Then, pfft, nothing happens. They just let the property rot for years, and then they say, 'Oh, gee, it has to be demolished!'"
