= Kentucky Route 182 =

State highway in Kentucky, United States

Kentucky Route 182
- KY 182 highlighted in red

Route information
- Maintained by KYTC
- Length: 20.441 mi (32.897 km)

Major junctions
- South end: KY 986 in rural Carter Co
- US 60 near Olive Hill; I-64 near Olive Hill
- North end: McGlone Creek Road in rural Carter Co

Location
- Country: United States
- State: Kentucky
- Counties: Carter

Highway system
- Kentucky State Highway System; Interstate; US; State; Parkways
← KY 181	→ KY 183

Kentucky Route 182 (KY 182) is a 20.441-mile-long (32.897 km) state highway in Carter County, Kentucky, that runs from Kentucky Route 986 in rural Carter County south of Grahn to an unknown point on McGlone Creek Road 0.678 miles (1.091 km) past Cedar Run Road in rural Carter County southwest of Carter via Grahn.

== Route description ==
Route 182 begins in rural Carter County (near Grayson Lake State Park) at its junction with KY 986. It runs north to the community of Grahn before turning northwest and running until it reaches US 60 just east of Olive Hill. This section of KY 182 is 8.535 miles and is classified "Rural Secondary" by the Kentucky Department of Transportation.

Route 182 runs concurrent with US 60 for two miles in a north-northeasterly direction, interchanging with I-64 at mile marker 161. It then splits from US 60 and runs north past the entrance to Carter Caves State Resort Park, which is situated west of KY182 near the community of Wolf. It then proceeds northwest until Wesleyville, Kentucky, where it intersects with KY 2. This section of KY 182 is 7.333 miles and is classified "State Secondary" by KDOT. After a short concurrency with Route 2, Route 182 splits off to the northwest and continues until McGlone Creek Road, where state maintenance ends.

== Major intersections ==
The entire route is in Carter County.

Location	mi	km	Destinations	Notes
	0.000	0.000	KY 986	Southern terminus
	1.219	1.962	KY 3295 east (Rattlesnake Ridge Road) / Clifty Church Road	Western terminus of KY 3295
	3.919	6.307	KY 3298 north / Church Ridge Road	Southern terminus of KY 3298
	8.535	13.736	US 60 west	South end of US 60 overlap
	9.067– 9.085	14.592– 14.621	I-64 – Ashland, Lexington	I-64 exit 161
	9.227	14.849	Newsome Cemetery Road (KY 2933 east) / Frontage Road (KY 2934 west)	Western terminus of KY 2933; eastern terminus of KY 2934
	9.830	15.820	KY 209 north (Cascade Road)	Southern terminus of KY 209
	10.545	16.971	US 60 east	North end of US 60 overlap
	11.730	18.878	KY 209 south (Cascade Road)	Northern terminus of KY 209
	17.878	28.772	KY 2 west	South end of KY 2 overlap
	18.309	29.465	KY 2 east	North end of KY 2 overlap
	20.441	32.897	End of state maintenance	Northern terminus; continues as McGlone Creek Road
1.000 mi = 1.609 km; 1.000 km = 0.621 mi: Concurrency terminus
