= Pictograph Cave =

Pictograph Cave may refer to the following places in the United States:

- Pictograph Cave (Mountain View, Arkansas)
- Talagi Pictograph Cave, Andersen Air Force Base, Guam
- Carter Caves Pictograph (15CR60), Olive Hill, Kentucky, listed on the NRHP in Carter County, Kentucky
- Pictograph Cave (Billings, Montana)
- Pictograph Cave, Arnold Lava Tube System, Deschutes County, Oregon
- Pictograph Cave (Hillsboro, Texas), listed on the NRHP in Hill County, Texas
