= Academy for College and Career Exploration =

Public secondary school in Maryland, USA

Coordinates: 39.3305191°N 76.6378119°W

Location
- 1300 West 36th Street; Baltimore, Maryland 21211; United States

Information
- School type: Public
- Motto: "Where Learning Comes to Life."
- Founded: 2004
- School district: Baltimore City Public Schools
- Superintendent: Sonja Brookins Santelises
- School number: 427
- Principal: Luis Espinoza
- Grades: 6-12
- Enrollment: 950 (2023)
- Area: Urban
- Mascot: Eagle
- Team name: ACCE Eagles
- Website: www.baltimorecityschools.org/schools/427
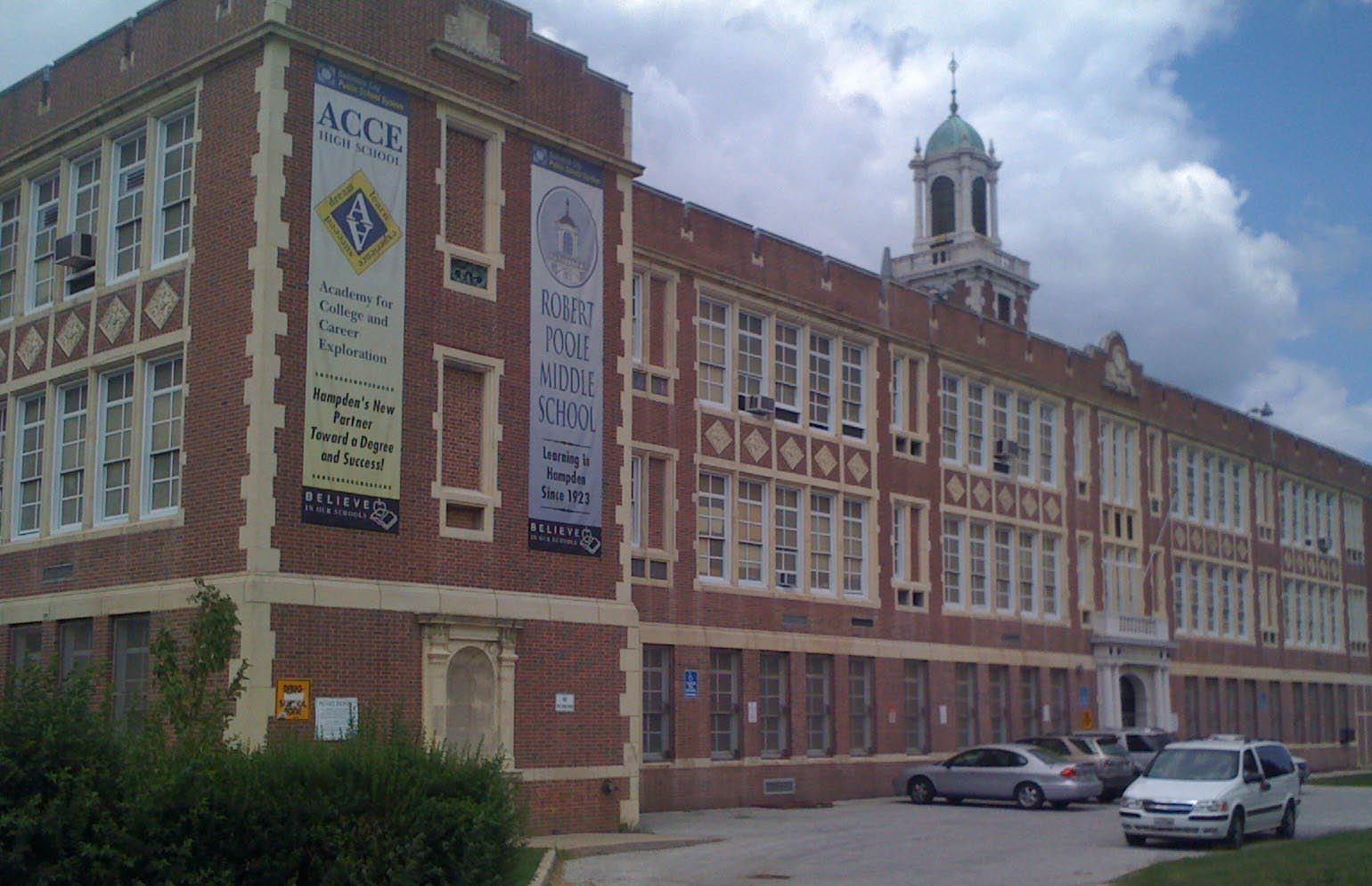

Academy for College and Career Exploration (ACCE) is a public secondary school located in Baltimore, Maryland, United States. The school opened in the city in fall 2004 under the guidance of being an "innovation" school by Johns Hopkins researchers. Another school created with the same guidelines of being an "innovation" school, Baltimore Talent Development also opened around the same time. ACCE is now converted into a "transformation" middle/high school with grades 6-7/9-12 for the 2011–2012 school year.
