= Straight Creek =

Straight Creek may refer to:

- Straight Creek Township, Jackson County, Kansas
- Straight Creek, Kentucky
- Straight Creek (Ohio River), a stream in Ohio
- Straight Creek Fault
