= Norton Branch, Kentucky =

Unincorporated community in Kentucky, United States

Coordinates: 38°19′49″N 82°48′22″W

Norton Branch is an unincorporated community in Carter County, in the U.S. state of Kentucky.

== History ==
A post office called Norton Branch was established in 1910, and remained in operation until 1912. The community is located at the mouth of Norton Branch creek, from which it takes its name.
