= Tygarts Creek =

Coordinates: 38.73147°N 82.95517°W

Tygarts Creek is a tributary of the Ohio River in Carter and Greenup counties of northeastern Kentucky in the United States. It is 88 miles (142 km) long and drains an area of 339.6 square miles (880 km^{2}). Via the Ohio, it is part of the watershed of the Mississippi River. Tygarts Creek is named for early Kentucky explorer Michael Tygart, who eventually drowned in the creek, somewhere near the mouth.

Tygarts Creek is formed in southwestern Carter County by the confluence of minor tributaries, Upper Tygart Branch and Flat Fork. It is joined a few miles down stream by the larger tributary known as Soldier Fork. Tygarts Creek flows generally north-northeastwardly past Olive Hill and Carter Caves State Park into Greenup County, where it flows into the Ohio River at the city of South Shore.

At its mouth, Tygarts Creek's mean annual discharge is 418.3 cubic feet per second (11.84 m^{3}/s).

== See also ==
- List of Kentucky rivers
