= Harlem Park Three =

American trio wrongfully convicted in 1984

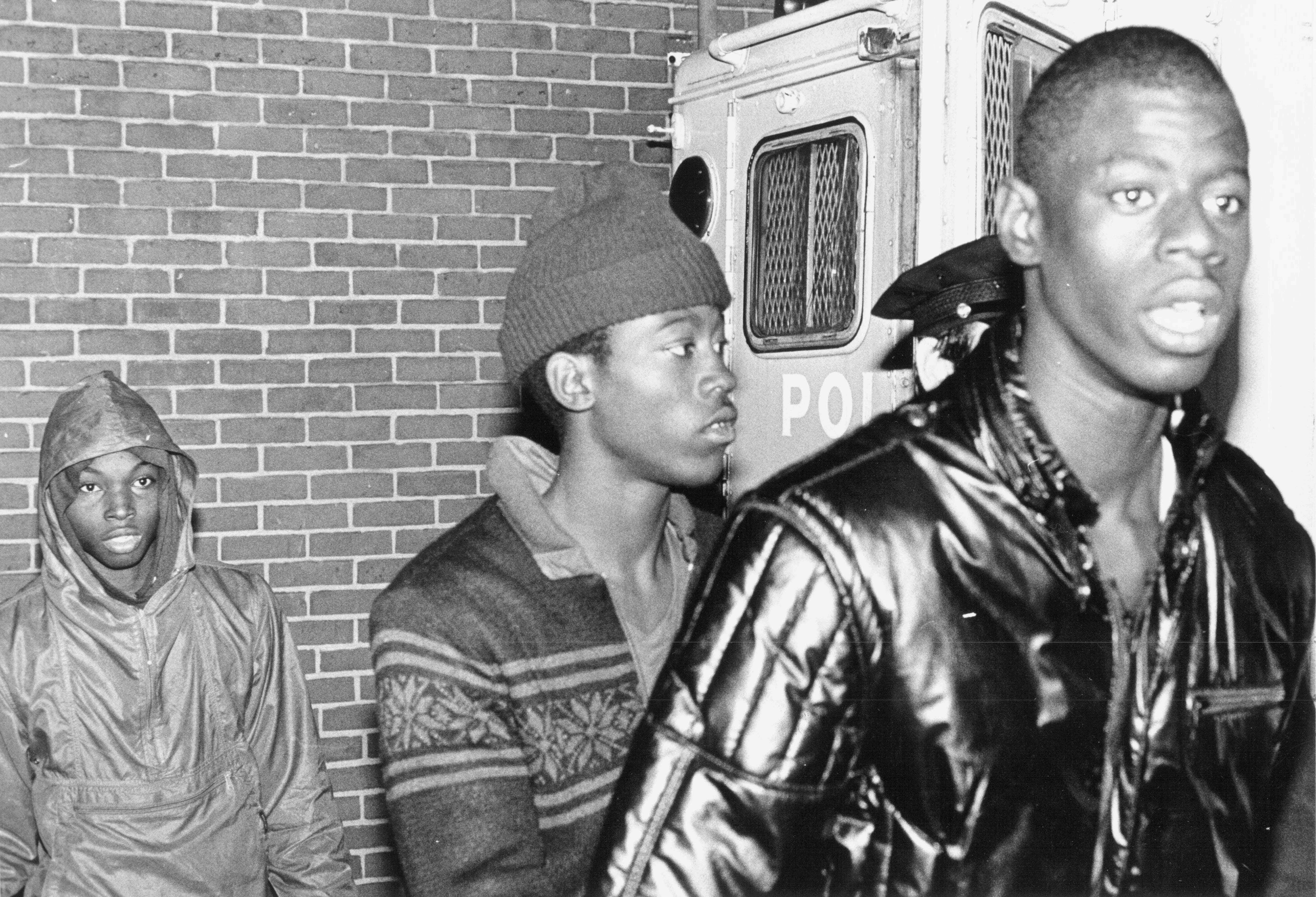
The Harlem Park Three (Left to right: Andrew Stewart, Alfred Chestnut and Ransom Watkins) in 1983

The Harlem Park Three were a trio of American students, Alfred Chestnut, Andrew Stewart, and Ransom Watkins, who were falsely accused of murdering ninth grader DeWitt Duckett at Harlem Park Junior High School in the Harlem Park neighborhood of Baltimore in 1983 and sentenced to life in prison. They served 36 years in prison before being exonerated in 2019. After being exonerated, the trio sued the Baltimore Police Department in 2020, accusing the department of coercing witness statements. In 2023, they settled for US$48 million, the largest settlement in Baltimore history.

== Murder of DeWitt Duckett ==
Around 1:25 pm on November 18, 1983, 14-year-old ninth grader DeWitt Duckett walked with two other students to the cafeteria of Harlem Park Junior High School through a quiet hallway. While going to the cafeteria, Duckett, who was wearing a US$52 to $75 ($168 to $242 in 2025) (Note: The Baltimore Sun reported that the jacket cost $52 – 75; The New Yorker reported it cost $65.) Georgetown University jacket, was approached by a man with a small-caliber gun and two other people. The man asked Duckett to take off his jacket. While Duckett was taking off his jacket, the man pointed his gun at the students with Duckett, who ran away. As they were running away, the man shot Duckett in the right side of his neck. The two people with the man walked away and did not participate in the robbery or shooting. After being shot, Duckett ran upstairs, through the cafeteria, and collapsed in front of the doors to the administration offices. He was taken to the R Adams Cowley Shock Trauma Center and was pronounced dead at 3 p.m. It was the first murder in the history of Baltimore City Public Schools.

== Investigation and trial ==
After Duckett's death, the primary witness was Ron Bishop, one of the students with Duckett when he was murdered. School staff also reported that three non-student 16-year-olds, Alfred Chestnut, Andrew Stewart, and Ransom Watkins, were in the building earlier in the day. The murder investigation was assigned to veteran Baltimore Police Department detective Donald Kincaid. The day after the shooting, Kincaid went to Chestnut's and Watkins's houses for questioning. Chestnut was wearing a Georgetown jacket during the questioning, and they both maintained their innocence and Chestnut stated the jacket was his. Kincaid took pictures of all three suspects.

Soon after taking their pictures, Kincaid went to Bishop's house and showed him 11 pictures of potential suspects. He recognized Chestnut, Stewart, and Watkins from elementary school but did not single out a suspect. This repeated twice. Duckett's funeral was held and was attended by then-Councilman and future U.S. Representative Kweisi Mfume. The afternoon of the funeral, Kincaid was informed of another potential witness, a 13-year-old girl who was interviewed in a conference room and identified Chestnut, Stewart, and Watkins. That evening, officers picked up Bishop without his parents. He was placed in a small room with Kincaid and a photo array. Kincaid was accusatory and threatened that Bishop would not be allowed to leave and could be charged with being an accessory to murder if Bishop did not tell who did it. A total of four witnesses (including Bishop) said that Chestnut, Stewart, and Watkins did the murder. The next day, Thanksgiving (November 24), they were arrested on charges of murder, armed robbery, and handgun violations. On May 28, 1984, Chestnut, Stewart, and Watkins were all found guilty of felony murder and sentenced to life in prison.

== Exoneration ==
I’m tired of living this lie, that those three guys did it. If I have to tell the truth and it sends me to prison, I’ll go to prison.

— Ron Bishop, 2019

In 2017 Chestnut’s childhood friend, also his high school sweetheart, Angela McKnight became involved in his case. She began advocating for him, and played a significant role in helping to uncover evidence, and other witnesses that supported his claim of innocence. McKnight while working on the case enlisted the help of Charles Curlet , an attorney who provided Pro Bono to assistance to her. Both McKnight and Curlet are cited in National Registry of Exonerations for their efforts in this exoneration. In a 2023 news story conducted by WJZ, McKnight is named an unsung hero in the exoneration of the Harlem Park 3.

In 2018 McKnight assisted Chestnut in obtaining records that had been sealed for years and when he saw them for the first time he noticed one of the leads said that a person named Michael Willis, who had been shot dead in 2002, was reported to have been at the school when the murder happened, was armed, and wore a Georgetown University jacket to a skating rink later that day. In 2019, Chestnut sent a five-page letter to State's Attorney Marilyn Mosby. The letter landed on the desk of Lauren Lipscomb, a prosecutor who led the unit for wrongful convictions. She re-investigated the case due to the trio insisting on their innocence during the entirety of their imprisonment. She thought the case against the trio was strong, but she noticed that, when cross-examined, the witnesses could not testify to any details beyond their claim that the trio did it. In June, she received another letter from Chestnut with the investigative reports.

In the summer, Bishop, who was now 50 years old, received a letter from Mosby's office about the case State v. Alfred Chestnut, et al. The letter frightened Bishop who initially did not respond, thinking that he could be arrested for lying under oath or a fabricated crime, but he convinced himself that he would respond.

On August 8, 2019, he walked into Lipscomb's office and told about how his friend was killed, how he had been threatened by Kincaid, and how he lied in court. The other witnesses were interviewed, and they all confessed that they were coerced by Kincaid.

On November 22, 2019, Mosby, alongside Lipscomb, visited the trio in their prisons to announce that they were freed. Three days later, they were taken to a courthouse where Baltimore City Circuit Court Judge Charles Peters apologized to the trio and set them free. In March 2020, the Maryland Board of Public Works voted to pay US$2.9 million to each of the three men following their exoneration.

== Lawsuit against the Baltimore Police Department and settlement ==
When they sent us to prison as teenagers, they stole our lives from us. They took our families from us. They took our childhoods. This lawsuit can't bring back everything we lost, but it's an important step as we try to move forward and heal.

— Alfred Chestnut, 2020

In 2020, after being exonerated, the trio sued the Baltimore Police Department, Kincaid, and two other police officers, accusing them of coercing statements to support a manufactured narrative. In 2023, the Baltimore Board of Estimates approved a US$48 million settlement outside of court between the trio and the Baltimore Police Department, the largest in Baltimore's history. In the settlement, the trio receives US$14.9 million each and their attorneys receive a total of US$3.3 million.
