= Rooney, Kentucky =

Unincorporated community in Kentucky, United States

- Unincorporated community
- Location within Kentucky Location within the United States
- Coordinates: 38°24′54″N 83°11′27″W
- Country: United States
- State: Kentucky
- County: Carter
- Elevation: 791 ft (241 m)
- Time zone: UTC-5 (Eastern (EST))
  - Summer (DST): UTC-4 (EDT)
- Area code: 606
- GNIS feature ID: 508966

Rooney is an unincorporated community in Carter County, Kentucky, United States.
