= Aviation Museum of Kentucky =

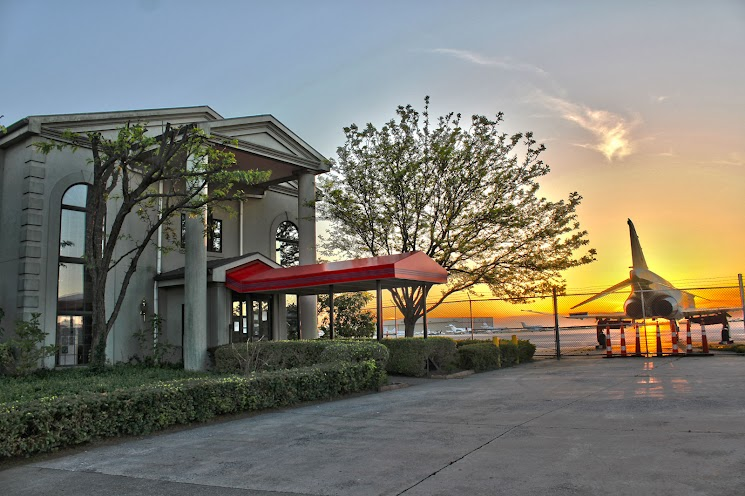

- Location within Kentucky Location within the United States
- Established: 1995
- Location: Blue Grass Airport, Lexington, Kentucky
- Coordinates: 38.0333990°N 84.5985006°W
- Type: Aviation museum
- Public transit access: Lextran Route 21
- Website: www.aviationky.org

The Aviation Museum of Kentucky is an aviation museum located at the Blue Grass Airport in Lexington, Kentucky. Incorporated in 1989, and opened to the public in April, 1995. It includes over 20,000 square feet (1,900 m^{2}) of exhibit space, a library, and an aircraft restoration and repair shop. The museum is the home of the Kentucky Aviation Hall of Fame.

Historic airplanes, photos, documents and training equipment are all included in the museum's permanent collection. A great number of the items from the museum's original displays were donated from the personal collections of members of the Kentucky Aviation History Roundtable. The Roundtable is a local group of aviation enthusiasts, founded in 1978, who developed the idea of a permanent aviation museum at the Blue Grass Airport.

As a part of its collection, the museum displays both military and civilian aircraft. Detailing aviation history, the museum houses exhibits that include jet fighters, sailplanes, aircraft engines, satellites and a wide range of scale aircraft models and artifacts. A gift shop is also available.

== Permanent display ==
- McDonnell RF-101 Voodoo (56-0125)
- US Navy Blue Angels A-4 Skyhawk
- Crosley Moonbeam biplane
- AH-1 Cobra helicopter
- US Navy Grumman F-14B Tomcat (161860)
- A replica of the Matthew Bacon Sellers Jr. 1908 Quadruplane, Kentucky's first airplane
- WACO biplane
- McDonnell Douglas F-4 Phantom
- A General Electric CF6 Turbofan Engine
- A Douglas A-3 Skywarrior McDonnell Douglas A-3D Skywarrior
- Flight simulators

== Gallery ==
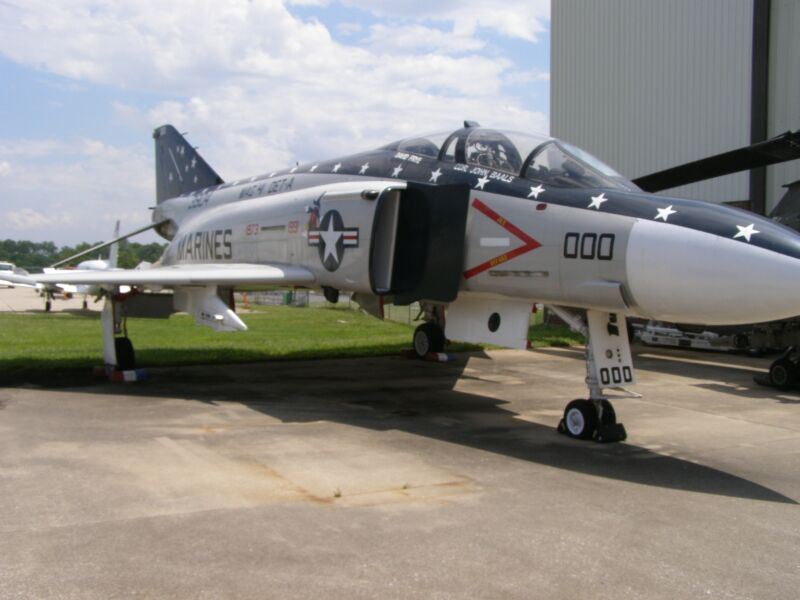
McDonnell Douglas F-4 Phantom II

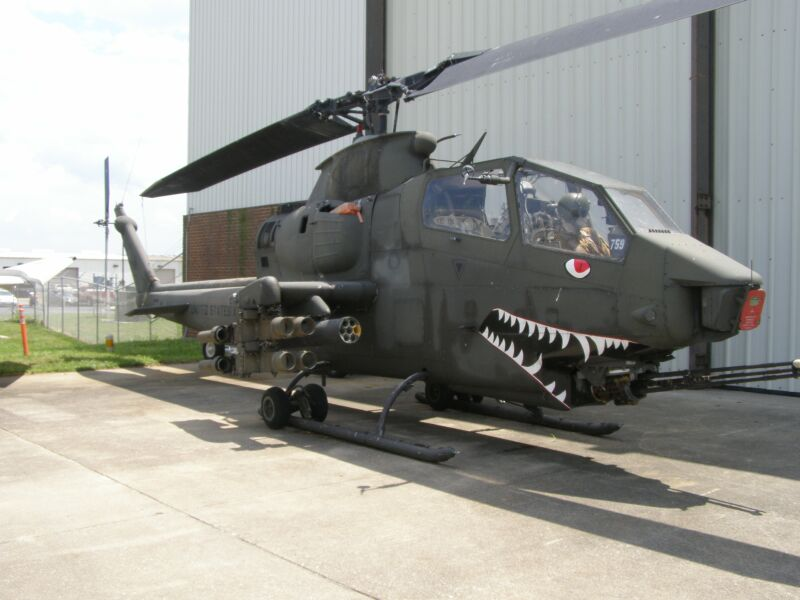
AH-1 Cobra

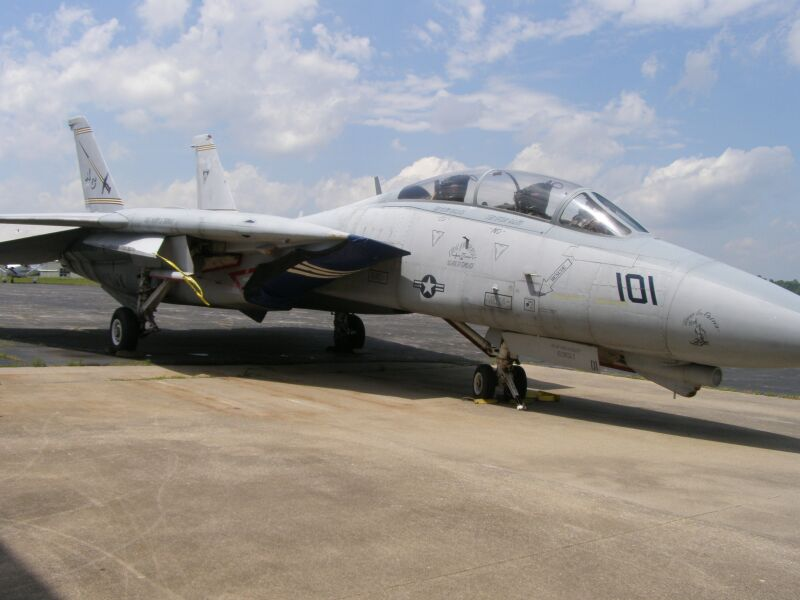
F-14 Tomcat
