= Joan McCall =

American actress (1940–2023)

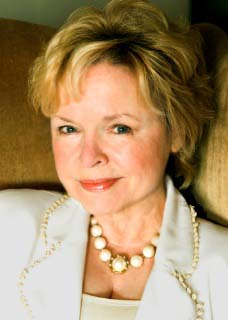
- Born: January 31, 1940; Grahn, Kentucky, U.S.
- Died: April 14, 2023 (aged 83)
- Spouse: David Sheldon

Joan McCall (January 31, 1940 – April 14, 2023) was an American screenwriter, film producer, actress and religious minister.

== Life and career ==
McCall was born in Grahn, Kentucky on January 31, 1940.

Her first film roles were in the 1974 movies Devil Times Five and Act of Vengeance and the 1976 horror film Grizzly. She starred on Broadway in A Race of Hairy Men, Barefoot in the Park and Star-Spangled Girl.

A prolific screenwriter, she wrote the original screenplay of Heart Like a Wheel and 250 scripts for Days of Our Lives, Another World, Santa Barbara, Divorce Court and Search for Tomorrow.

McCall was a Science of Mind minister, and served as the Spiritual Director of Creative Arts Center for Spiritual Living (CACSL) in Los Angeles until January 2011. She was married to Hollywood motion picture producer David Sheldon.

McCall died on April 14, 2023, at the age of 83.
