= Beetle, Kentucky =

Unincorporated community in Kentucky, United States

- Unincorporated community
- Location within the state of Kentucky Beetle (the United States)
- Coordinates: 38°11′44″N 82°56′47″W
- Country: United States
- State: Kentucky
- County: Carter
- Elevation: 650 ft (200 m)
- Time zone: UTC-6 (Central (CST))
  - Summer (DST): UTC-5 (CST)
- GNIS feature ID: 507485

Beetle is an unincorporated community located in Carter County, Kentucky, United States.

The origin of the name "Beetle" is obscure.
