= Beech Grove, Carter County, Kentucky =

Unincorporated community in Kentucky, United States

Beech Grove, Kentucky
- Unincorporated community
- Location within Kentucky Location within the United States
- Coordinates: 38°18′26″N 82°55′37″W
- Country: United States
- State: Kentucky
- County: Carter
- Elevation: 620 ft (190 m)
- Time zone: UTC-5 (Eastern (EST))
  - Summer (DST): UTC-4 (EDT)
- Area code: 606
- GNIS feature ID: 486711

Beech Grove is an unincorporated community in Carter County, Kentucky, United States. The community is located along Kentucky Route 1 2 miles (3.2 km) southeast of Grayson.
