= West Carter High School =

Coordinates: 38.311°N 83.151°W

Location
- 365 West Carter Drive; Olive Hill, Kentucky 41164; United States

Information
- Type: Public
- Established: 1971
- School district: Carter County Schools
- Principal: Kristen Bledsoe
- Teaching staff: 29.14 (on an FTE basis)
- Grades: 9-12
- Enrollment: 510 (2023-2024)
- Student to teacher ratio: 17.50
- Colors: Maroon, white and blue
- Nickname: Comets (boys), Lady Comets (girls)
- Website: www.cartercountyschools.org/o/wchs

West Carter High School is a high school located in Olive Hill, Kentucky and is part of the Carter County Schools System. Its mascot is the Comet, and the colors are maroon, blue, and white. The school motto is "We Champion High Success". The principal is Karen Tackett; the assistant principals are Kristen Bledsoe and Daniel Barker.

The school was completed in 1971, replacing the former Olive Hill High School.

== Scheduling information ==
West Carter High School is now following "trimester" scheduling. Students are able to choose a new schedule three times a year instead of one. This trimester scheduling is an opportunity for students to earn 7.5 credits a year. All underclassman are required to take Math, Science, English, and Social Studies. Besides the "core" classes students may sign up for electives, which are classes based on goals and interests.

== Attendance ==
It is believed by the Carter County Board of Education that there is a direct relationship between poor attendance and lack of achievement.

Illness of the student is excused, with parent note for up to 3 days per trimester. For longer than that limit a health care professional note is required.

== Athletics ==
- Archery
- Baseball
- Basketball- Boys
- Basketball- Girls
- Cheerleading
- Cross Country
- Football
- Golf
- Soccer
- Softball
- Tennis
- Track and Field
- Volleyball

== Lady Comets basketball ==
The West Carter Lady Comet Team was founded in 1974. It won the state championship for the first time in 2000. The coach at the time was John "Hop" Brown, the assistant coaches were Von Perry and Dana Smith, and the team members were Leah Frasier, Chelsea Hamilton, Cassondra Glover, Jenise James, Mandy Sterling, Megen Gearhart, Cathy Day, Kandi Brown, Shanna Shelton, Kayla Jones, Brooke Mullis, Nicki Burchett, Meghan Hillman, and Robin Butler.

Kandi Brown was named 'Most Valuable Player.' On the All Tournament team joining her were Megen Gearhart and Mandy Sterling.

== Extracurricular eligibility ==
Students must be passing 2/3 of classes to engage in extracurricular activities. Students leaving school early are not allowed to attend practice or a game. Any student on out-of-school suspension shall not take part in any extra-curricular activity until the suspension has been lifted.

== Dress code ==
- Shorts and skirts must be knee length
- No sleeveless tops and no tank top
- No undergarment to be seen
- No holes above the knee
- No hats, bandanas, ascots, or other headwear in the building
- No drug, alcohol, tobacco or otherwise inappropriate advertisement or logos
