= Davy Run, Kentucky =

Unincorporated community in Kentucky, United States

- Unincorporated community
- Location within the state of Kentucky Davy Run (the United States)
- Coordinates: 38°14′49″N 82°53′8″W
- Country: United States
- State: Kentucky
- County: Carter
- Elevation: 656 ft (200 m)
- Time zone: UTC-6 (Central (CST))
  - Summer (DST): UTC-5 (CST)
- GNIS feature ID: 2337223

Davy Run is an unincorporated community located in Carter County, Kentucky, United States. It was also known as the Davy Mines.
