= Olive Hill =

Olive Hill may refer to: Populated Places

- Olive Hill, California
- Olive Hill, Kentucky
- Olivehill, Tennessee
- Olive Hill, Virginia (listed on the NRHP in Virginia)

Summit

- Olive Hill (California)
