= Denton, Kentucky =

Unincorporated community in Kentucky, United States

- Unincorporated community
- Location within the state of Kentucky Denton (the United States)
- Coordinates: 38°15′53″N 82°51′45″W
- Country: United States
- State: Kentucky
- County: Carter
- Time zone: UTC-5 (Eastern (EST))
  - Summer (DST): UTC-4 (EDT)
- ZIP codes: 41132
- GNIS feature ID: 507847

Denton is an unincorporated community near Grayson in Carter County, Kentucky, United States. The community's postal zip code is 41132. A post office existed here from 1881 until 2004 when it was closed and mail service was transferred to nearby Hitchins although the community retained its zip code. It is centered around the former Chesapeake and Ohio Railway track where several stores and a hotel once operated. The former hotel and a store building are still standing.
