= Talent Development High School (Baltimore, Maryland) =

Former public school in Maryland, USA

Baltimore Talent Development High School
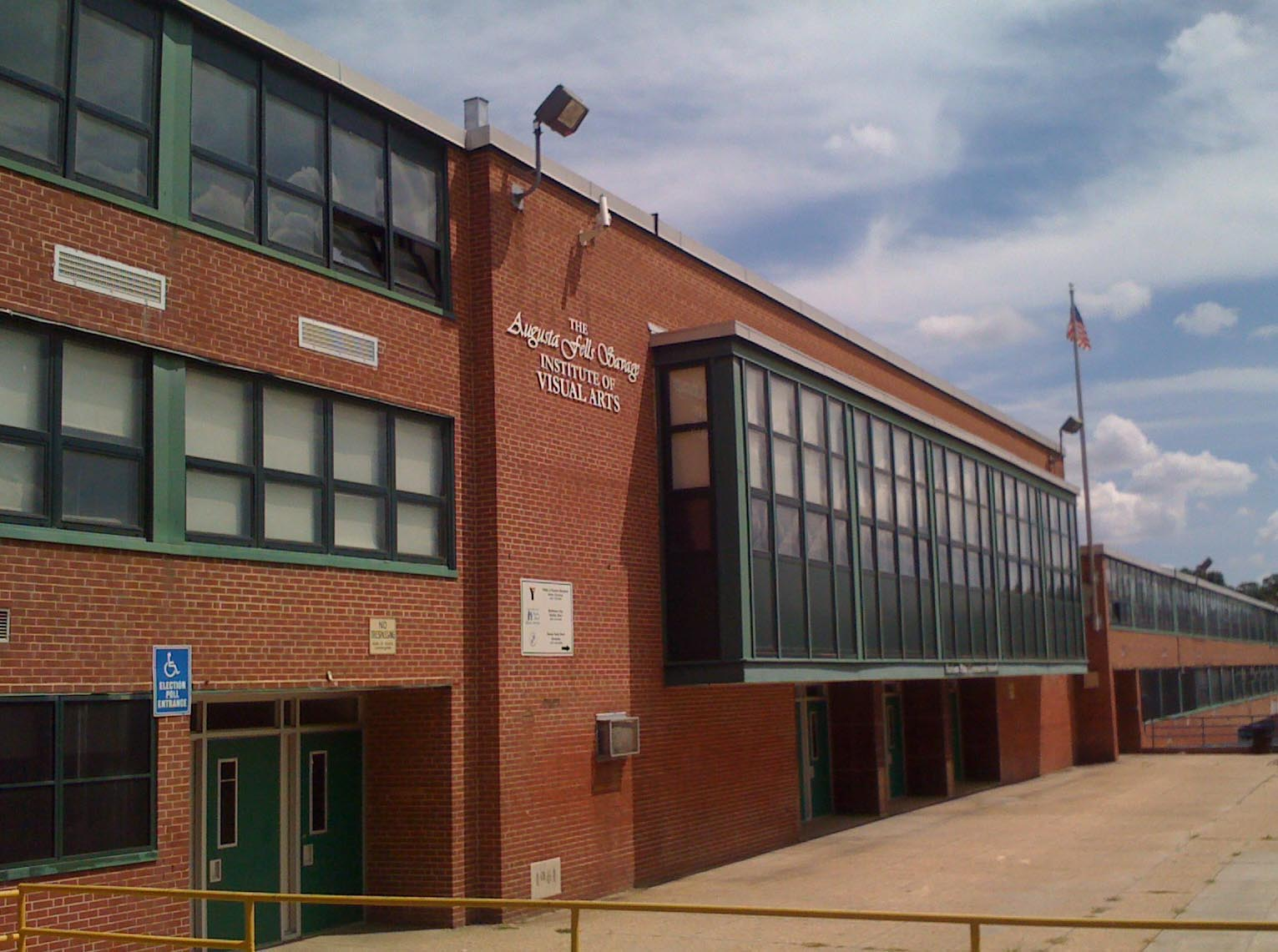
- The school was located in the same building as the Augusta Fells Savage Institute of Visual Arts.

Location
- 1500 Harlem Avenue; Baltimore, Maryland 21217; United States; 39°17′50″N 76°38′34″W

Information
- School type: Public, Charter (similar), Defunct
- Founded: 2004
- School district: Baltimore City Public Schools
- School number: 428
- Principal: Laura Schulz
- Grades: 9-12
- Enrollment: 397 (2014)
- Area: Urban
- Colors: Black and Gold
- Mascot: Saber
- Team name: Sabers
- Website: www.baltimorecityschools.org/428

Baltimore Talent Development High School was a public high school located in Harlem Park, Baltimore, Maryland, United States. It was situated in a crime-ridden, low-income and working-class neighborhood of Baltimore. The school was geared toward ensuring these high-risk potential dropouts graduate with the honed abilities to succeed in college. It was voted to be closed by the Baltimore school board in 2014.
