= Grahn, Kentucky =

Unincorporated community in Kentucky, United States

- Unincorporated community
- Location within the state of Kentucky Grahn (the United States)
- Coordinates: 38°17′1″N 83°4′31″W
- Country: United States
- State: Kentucky
- County: Carter
- Elevation: 692 ft (211 m)
- Time zone: UTC-5 (Eastern (EST))
  - Summer (DST): UTC-4 (EDT)
- ZIP codes: 41142
- GNIS feature ID: 493087

Grahn is an unincorporated community in Carter County, Kentucky, United States. It lies along Route 182, east of Olive Hill and southwest of the county seat of Grayson. Its elevation is 692 feet (211 m). It has a post office with the ZIP code 41142. The ZCTA for ZIP code 41142 had a population of 95 at the 2000 census.

A post office was established in the community in 1888 as Fireclay. In 1909, it was renamed Grahn in honor of the German immigrant Karl Bernhard Grahn, founder of a successful brickyard.

A school was constructed in Grahn in the 1930s under the direction of the WPA. This building was originally Grahn High School; later it became Grahn Elementary School. When the school was closed in 1994, residents of the area sought to purchase the building and renovate it into a community center. After a grant was received in 1997, the Grahn School Community Center opened to provide services for people in Grahn and the surrounding area, including a library, thrift store, sports facilities and computer classes.

Kirk Memorial Baptist Church is in Grahn and was established in 1889. It is the oldest Southern Baptist Church in the area.

== Notable natives and residents ==
- Joan McCall, screenwriter, film producer, actress and religious minister
- Matthew Bacon Sellers Jr., aviation pioneer who built the first airplane in Kentucky
