= Mount Savage, Kentucky =

Unincorporated community in Kentucky, United States

Coordinates: 38°15′55″N 82°53′29″W

Mount Savage is an unincorporated community in Carter County, Kentucky, in the United States. It remains a primarily rural and residential enclave, valued for its scenic landscape and proximity to the larger city of Grayson.

== History ==
Mount Savage once contained a blast furnace. A post office was established at Mount Savage in 1848, and discontinued in 1916.
