= Soldier, Kentucky =

Unincorporated community in Kentucky, United States

- Unincorporated community
- Location within the state of Kentucky Soldier (the United States)
- Coordinates: 38°15′33″N 83°17′58″W
- Country: United States
- State: Kentucky
- County: Carter
- Elevation: 968 ft (295 m)
- Time zone: UTC-5 (Eastern (EST))
  - Summer (DST): UTC-4 (EST)
- ZIP codes: 41173
- GNIS feature ID: 515531

Soldier is an unincorporated community and coal town in Carter County, Kentucky, United States.
