= Olive Hill High School =

Former public school in Olive Hill, Kentucky

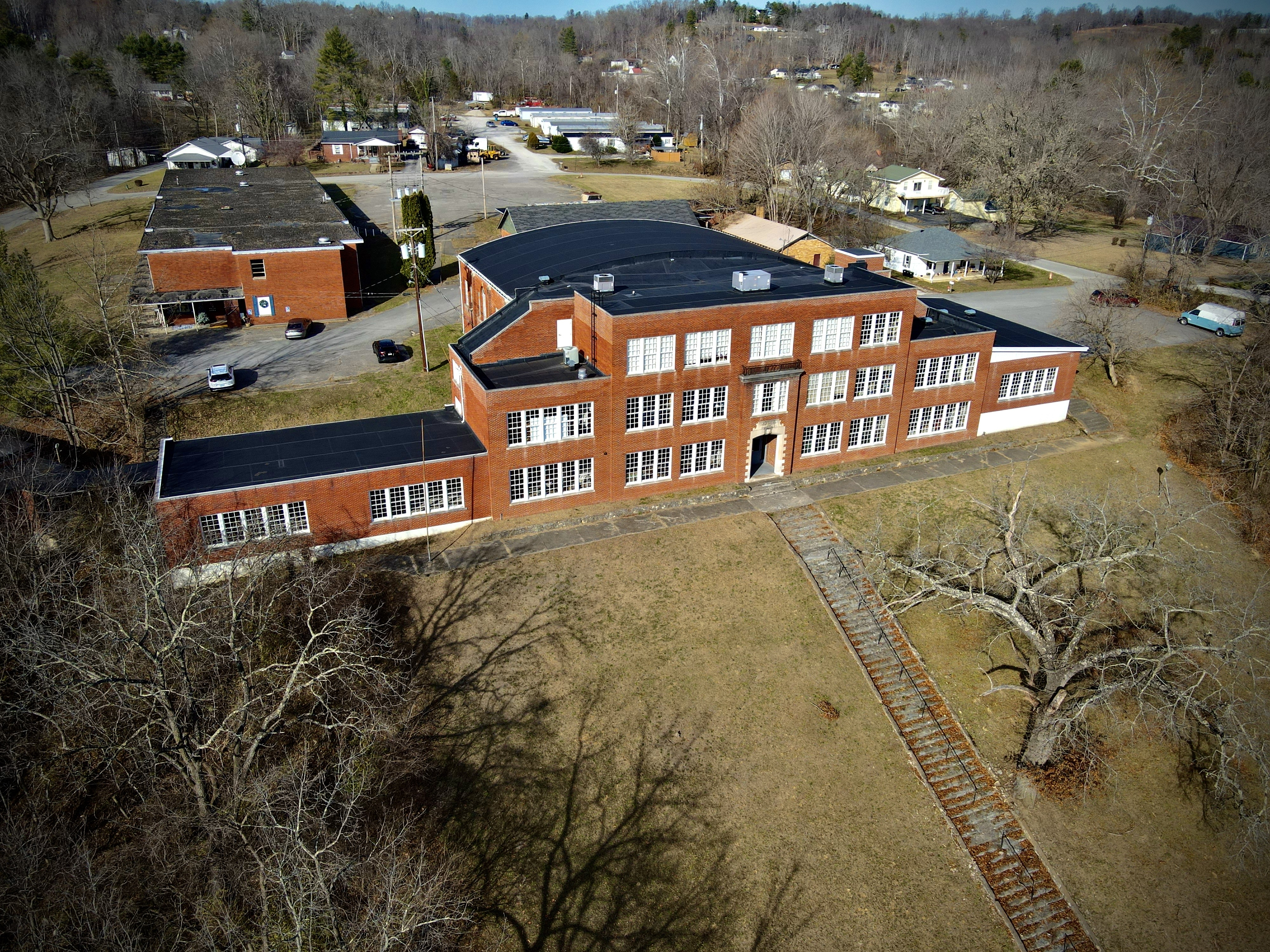
- The Olive Hill High School campus in 2022

General information
- Location: 120 Comet Drive, Olive Hill, Kentucky, United States
- Current tenants: Olive Hill Center for Arts & Heritage; Olive Hill Branch, Carter County Public Library
- Opened: 1929
- Owner: Olive Hill Historical Society

Olive Hill High School is a three-story brick former public school in Olive Hill, Kentucky. Built in 1929 on a hillside above U.S. Route 60, the campus later served elementary grades until its closure in 1994. Since 1998 it has been under local stewardship and is being adaptively reused for community arts and heritage programming; the building also houses the Olive Hill branch of the Carter County Public Library on its third floor.

== History ==
The school building was completed in 1929 on a prominent site above Olive Hill's main thoroughfare. Access between downtown and the campus is by a flight of 103 stone steps, a civic improvement constructed in the 1930s through local Works Progress Administration efforts.

After new facilities were built on the edge of town, the Olive Hill building ceased use as a public school in 1994. Prior to closure, limited maintenance and the salvage of interior fixtures left the structure in need of significant repair.

In December 1998 the mayor of Olive Hill purchased the former school for US$10,000 and transferred it to the Olive Hill Historical Society. A state-funded feasibility study by the Fitzsimons Office of Architecture outlined a plan for community reuse, and the project later received US$400,000 in Transportation Enhancement funds from the Kentucky Transportation Cabinet and Federal Highway Administration.

== Architecture and site ==
Olive Hill High School is a three-story, load-bearing brick building set on a steep hillside above U.S. 60. Its approach stair of 103 stone steps is a defining landscape feature and a well-known local landmark.

== Current use ==
Portions of the building have been renovated for community functions. The Olive Hill Center for Arts & Heritage (administered by the Olive Hill Historical Society) programs arts and heritage activities in the building, and the Olive Hill branch of the Carter County Public Library operates in the secondary building on campus. A 2023 feature on ongoing renovations reported continued build-out of classroom and exhibit spaces.

== See also ==
- West Carter High School
