= Olive Hill station =

- Olive Hill C & O Depot
- U.S. National Register of Historic Places
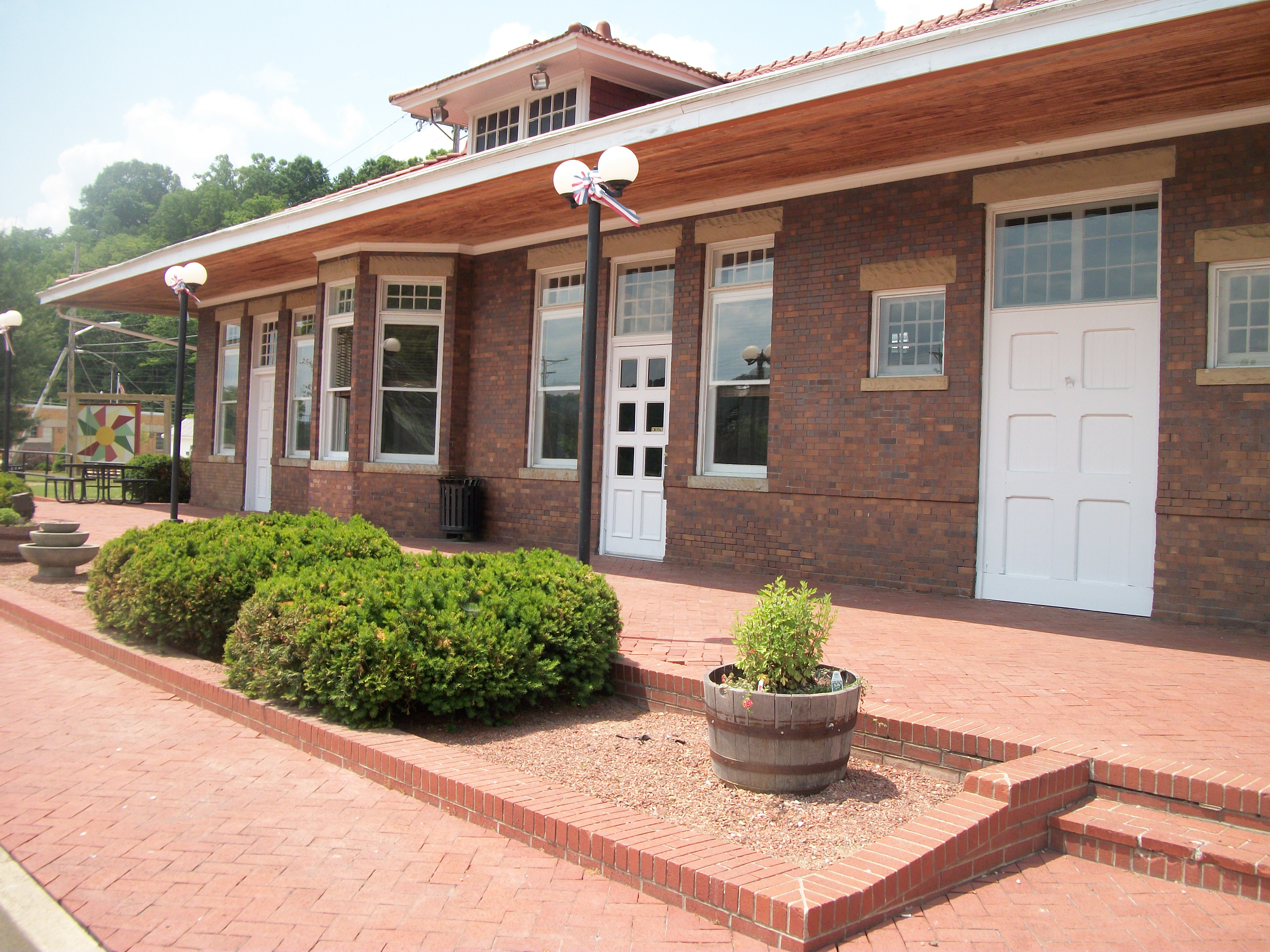
- Location: Railroad St. S side, W of jct. with Plum St., Olive Hill, Kentucky
- Coordinates: 38°17′59″N 83°10′31″W
- Area: less than one acre
- Built: 1910
- Architectural style: Prairie School
- NRHP reference No.: 92001487
- Added to NRHP: October 29, 1992

The Olive Hill C & O Depot is a historic Chesapeake & Ohio railway depot in Olive Hill, Kentucky which was listed on the National Register of Historic Places in 1992.

It was built in 1910, on the southern side of Railroad St., west of the junction with Plum St. in Olive Hill, in Prairie School style.

It was renovated for use as a First National Bank branch in 1989–1990.

Preceding station	Chesapeake and Ohio Railway	Following station
Enterprise toward Louisville	Louisville – Ashland	Aden toward Ashland
