= Norton Branch (Kentucky) =

Stream in Kentucky

Coordinates: 38.3289710°N 82.8065534°W

Norton Branch is a stream in Carter County of the U.S. state of Kentucky. It is a tributary of Williams Creek.

Norton Branch takes its name from Col. E. M. Norton, proprietor of the local Norton Iron Works.

== See also ==
- List of rivers of Kentucky
