= New Leaders =

New Leaders, Inc.
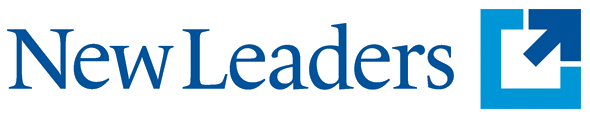
- Founded: 2000
- Type: Nonprofit organization
- Purpose: Educational
- Location: New York, NY
- Key people: Jean Desravines, chief executive officer Jaime Aquino, chief program officer Jon Schnur, co-founder & board member Benjamin Fenton, co-founder
- Website: newleaders.org

New Leaders is an American non-profit organization that aims to recruit and train school leaders who focus on improving education results for poor and minority students. It also aims to promote system-level policies and practices that provide support to these leaders. The organization was founded in 2000 as New Leaders for New Schools by Jonathan Schnur and a group of teachers and investors. Research from the Harvard Business School and RAND corporation has found that principals from the New Leaders program have "outperform[ed] their peers". As of 2016, the organization trains education leaders at all levels, in more than 20 cities across the United States.

== Creation and history ==
New Leaders (formerly "New Leaders for New Schools") was founded in 2000 by a group including Jonathan Schnur, former education policy analyst for President Bill Clinton; Ben Fenton, former management consultant at McKinsey & Co.; Mike Johnston, a former Teach for America corps member; Allison Gaines, a former New York City public school teacher; and Monique Burns, an education-reform advocate specializing in charter schools. The idea was developed while the group was attending graduate school at Harvard University as an approach to the impending shortage of school principals nationwide.

In 2000, the concept was a finalist in the Harvard Business School's annual business plan contest, the first non-profit submission to earn such recognition. Following the contest, New Leaders received funding offers and was able to formally begin operation.

By 2001, New Leaders had chosen and trained the first 15 participants to serve as urban school principals. That year the program launched in New York City, Chicago and the Aspire Public Schools charter network in Northern California. The program later expanded into other areas, including Washington, D.C. late in 2001, Memphis in 2004, and Baltimore in 2005, with continued growth thereafter.

In addition to its flagship Aspiring Principals program, New Leaders introduced a range of newer programs to train teacher leaders, assistant principals, academic coaches, instructional teams, and principal supervisors. They have since added other programs focused on instructional leadership, instructional teams, and developing principal supervisors.

Since its founding, New Leaders has trained nearly 2,400 leaders who annually reach more than 450,000 students in the United States. According to the RAND Corporation, the program has measurably raised student achievement and high school graduation rates.

== Function ==
=== Mission ===
According to its mission statement, New Leaders is a non-profit organization that aims to ensure high academic achievement for students in poverty and students of color by training school leaders to drive improvement in schools with low test scores and high poverty rates. It also aims to advance policies and practices that allow these leaders to reach their goals.

=== Training and placement ===
New Leaders has developed partnerships with public school systems and charter schools in selected cities, where participants in three job-embedded leadership development programs (Leading Instruction, Emerging Leaders, and Aspiring Principals) are placed into leadership-position vacancies in elementary, middle, and high schools, in some cases through external recruitment but more often by identifying strong candidates within the partner district/network. The organization relies on nominations to help identify potential candidates, who must then complete a multi-step application process, with emphasis on selecting experienced professionals who demonstrate a variety of strengths, including leadership and communication skills and a deep belief that all children are capable of high academic achievement. Aspiring Principals participants are provided with hands-on training through a one-year residency in an urban public school, where they are mentored by a veteran principal and expert coaches from New Leaders' staff. Following completion of the residency, the participant applies for an open position. When applicants enroll in the New Leaders principal training program, they are required to a make at least a three-year commitment to serving as a principal or assistant principal in these districts, and they continue to receive support and guidance from New Leaders once they accept a position. They also receive one to two years of induction support after being appointed as a new principal in their own school.

Starting in 2001, according to New Leaders' website, it has broadened its program offerings aiming to reach more students and expand its scope to include teacher leaders, academic coaches, and assistant principals through its Emerging Leaders and Leading Instruction programs. Like Aspiring Principals, those programs emphasize on-the-job learning and coaching during the training year.

In addition to these application-based programs, New Leaders operates three other programs in partnership with school districts/charter networks: Transforming Teams, Principal Institute, and Principal Supervisors. New Leaders also produces research on effective school leadership and advocates for policies and practices that support school leaders.

The organization is funded by private-sector contributions, public sources and philanthropists, with major supporters including The Boeing Company, the Bill & Melinda Gates Foundation, and the Wallace Foundation, among others.

=== Impact ===
In its first eight years, 95% of participants in the New Leaders program went on to hold leadership positions in urban schools. The RAND Corporation evaluates every principal from the New Leaders program using precise metrics on what improvements students have made and how results in New Leader placement schools compare with other schools. At a substantial majority of these schools, the preliminary findings have shown that there is marked improvement. The RAND Corporation data shows schools led by New Leader principals have made gains at a higher rate than the national average, and their dropout rate has declined. A report published by New Leaders identified five key factors that it stated appear to be essential in the task of quickly turning around poorly performing public schools. According to the report, principals who have overseen dramatic student improvements have tended to focus on instituting achievement-based learning and teaching, improving the school culture, placing the right people in the right roles, managing the facilities and operations properly, and leading by personal example.

New Leaders measures the impact on student performance through comparison of their principals' results to other schools in their systems to assess whether students in New Leaders' schools outperform similar students. It found that graduation rates in New Leaders' high schools are substantially higher than district graduation rates. New Leaders also focuses on the performance of the program in transforming participating schools, and cites results showing that New Leader schools were twice as likely to have significantly improved student proficiency test scores in 2009, compared with other schools.

In 2009, New Leaders received an "Innovations in American Government" award from the Ash Institute for Democratic Governance at Harvard's John F. Kennedy School of Government.

== Geographic reach ==
- Arlington, Texas, established 2014
- Baltimore, established 2005
- Bridgeport, Connecticut, established 2015
- Central Valley, California, established 2016
- Charlotte, North Carolina, established 2008
- Chicago, established 2001
- Dallas, established 2016
- Duval County, Florida, established 2015
- Fresno, California, established 2016
- Hidalgo County, Texas, established 2016
- Jersey City, established 2015
- Memphis, Tennessee, established 2004
- Minneapolis, established 2015
- New York City, established 2001
- Newark, established 2001
- Norwalk, Connecticut, established 2016
- Pasadena, California, established 2015
- Rhode Island, established 2016
- San Antonio, established 2016
- San Francisco Bay Area, established 2001
- Washington, D.C., established 2002

== Executive team ==
As of 2019 the following individuals hold positions on the executive team of New Leaders.

Name	Role
Jean Desravines	Chief Executive Officer
Sonia Beatty	Chief of Staff to CEO & Talent Officer
Michele Caracappa	Chief Program Officer
Jackie Gran	Chief Policy & Evaluation Officer
John Jenkins	Deputy Chief Officer, Program Implementation
Laura Kadetsky	General Counsel, Chief Business Solutions Officer, & Secretary
Gabe Scheck	Chief Development Officer
Noah Wepman	Chief Financial & Growth Officer
