= Carter County Schools (Kentucky) =

School district in Carter County, Kentucky

Carter County Schools is a school district based in Carter County, Kentucky. The district includes the cities of Grayson and Olive Hill. The current Superintendent of Carter County Schools, KY is Paul Green, Ed.D.

== Schools ==
=== High schools ===
- East Carter High School is located in Grayson. The school's colors are Red, White and Blue. The East Carter High mascot is the Raiders.
- West Carter High School located in Olive Hill. The school's colors are Maroon and White. The West Carter High mascot is the Comets.

=== Middle schools ===
- There are two middle schools in the Carter County District. East and West Carter Middle School.

East Carter Middle School is located in, Grayson, Kentucky, while West Carter Middle School is located Olive Hill, Kentucky.

Both East and West Middle house the 6th, 7th, and 8th grade. East Carter's mascot is the Raiders, while West Carter's mascot is the Comets. (Formerly the Warriors.)

=== Primary schools ===
- Carter Elementary School is located in Carter City, Kentucky. Its mascot is the Wildcat, and the school colors are blue and white. Students advance to both East and West Carter Middle Schools. This building served as a high school until the school was merged with Olive Hill High School to form West Carter High School.
- Heritage Elementary School is located near Hitchins, Kentucky. It was formed from the consolidation of the former Hitchins and Willard Elementary Schools. Students advance to East Carter. Its mascot is the Patriot.
- Olive Hill Elementary School is located in Olive Hill. Its colors are Maroon and white, and its mascot is the bulldog. Students advance to West Carter. It is a consolidation of Grahn, Lawton, Soldier, and Olive Hill Elementary Schools.
- Prichard Elementary is located in Grayson, KY. The school colors are Black and Gold. The school mascot is the Yellow Jacket. Students advance to East Carter.
- Star Elementary located in Rush, Kentucky. The school mascot is the Rocket. Students advance to East Carter.
- Upper Tygart Elementary, located near Globe, Kentucky. School colors are Blue and White. The school mascot is the Tiger. Students advance to West Carter.

== 1993 East Carter High School shooting ==
The East Carter High School shooting occurred on January 18, 1993, in Grayson, Kentucky, United States. The incident occurred when 17-year-old Gary Scott Pennington walked into an English classroom and fatally shot his teacher Deanna McDavid and head custodian Marvin Hicks, and held classmates hostage for 15 minutes before surrendering to police.
