= Van Kitchen House =

Historic house in Kentucky, United States

- U.S. National Register of Historic Places
- Location within Kentucky Location within the United States
- Location: Off Kentucky Route 7 south of Grayson, Kentucky
- Coordinates: 38°14′15″N 82°59′32″W
- Area: less than one acre
- Built: 1838
- Built by: Horton, Elijah
- Architectural style: Saddle-bag
- NRHP reference No.: 74000857
- Added to NRHP: May 2, 1974

The Van Kitchen House, located south of Grayson, Kentucky, off Kentucky Route 7, is a saddlebag log house built in about 1838. It has also been known as the Elijah Horton House. It was listed on the National Register of Historic Places in 1974.

It is a two-story two-unit dwelling built of hewn logs and frame lapsiding, upon stone piers, built by or for Elijah Horton. The house was moved to its current location overlooking Grayson Lake in 1967.
