= Straight Creek, Kentucky =

Unincorporated community in Kentucky, United States

- Unincorporated community
- Location within the state of Kentucky Straight Creek (the United States)
- Coordinates: 38°16′4″N 82°52′39″W
- Country: United States
- State: Kentucky
- County: Carter
- Elevation: 630 ft (190 m)
- Time zone: UTC-6 (Central (CST))
  - Summer (DST): UTC-5 (CST)
- GNIS feature ID: 509144

Straight Creek is an unincorporated community and coal town in Carter County, Kentucky, United States.
