= Smith Creek (Missouri River tributary) =

Stream in Missouri, U.S.

Coordinates: 38°39′34″N 91°14′28″W

Smith Creek is a stream in Warren County in the U.S. state of Missouri. It is a tributary of the Missouri River.

Smith Creek most likely has the name of Wilhelm Schmidt (William Smith), a German settler.

== See also ==
- List of rivers of Missouri
- Tributaries of the Missouri River
