= Smith Creek (Coal River tributary) =

Stream in West Virginia, U.S.

Coordinates: 38°20′50″N 81°50′08″W

Smith Creek is a stream in the U.S. state of West Virginia. It is a tributary of the Coal River.

Smith Creek was named after Joseph Smith, a local pioneer.

== See also ==
- List of rivers of West Virginia
