= Smith Creek (Iowa River tributary) =

Stream in Louisa and Des Moines County, Iowa, U.S.

Coordinates: 41.0967002°N 91.0918133°W

Short Creek is a stream in Louisa and Des Moines counties, Iowa, in the United States. It is a tributary of the Iowa River.

Short Creek was so named for pioneer Smith, who settled on the creek.

== See also ==
- List of rivers of Iowa
