= Smith Creek (Crow Creek tributary) =

Stream in South Dakota, U.S.

Coordinates: 43°57′19″N 99°14′56″W

Smith Creek is a stream in the U.S. state of South Dakota. It is a tributary of Crow Creek.

Smith Creek has the name of Harry C. Smith, a law enforcement officer.

== See also ==
- List of rivers of South Dakota
