= Smiths Creek, Kentucky =

Unincorporated community in Kentucky, United States

- Unincorporated community
- Location within Kentucky Location within the United States
- Coordinates: 38°27′31″N 83°11′10″W
- Country: United States
- State: Kentucky
- County: Carter
- Elevation: 896 ft (273 m)
- Time zone: UTC-5 (Eastern (EST))
  - Summer (DST): UTC-4 (EDT)
- ZIP code: 41128
- Area code: 606
- GNIS feature ID: 509085

Smiths Creek is an unincorporated community in Carter County, Kentucky, United States. The community is located along Kentucky Route 474 15.6 miles (25.1 km) northwest of Grayson.
