= Harlem Park, Baltimore =

Neighborhood in Baltimore

Harlem Park
- Neighborhood of Baltimore
- Location within Baltimore Location within Maryland Location within the United States
- Coordinates: 39°17′46″N 76°38′25″W
- Country: United States
- State: Maryland
- City: Baltimore

Population (2020)
  - Total: 2,582
- Time zone: UTC−5 (Eastern)
  - Summer (DST): UTC−4 (EDT)
- Area Codes: 410, 443, 667

Harlem Park is a predominantly low-income African-American neighborhood in West Baltimore, Maryland. It is located directly south of the Sandtown-Winchester neighborhood, and east of Edmondson Avenue Historic District. It is bounded by West Lafayette Street to the north; North Fulton Ave. to the west (including about 1 block west of Fulton); Route 40 to the south; North Fremont Ave. to the east.

== History ==
The name Harlem comes from Dutch merchant Adrian Valeck who moved to Baltimore after the end of the Revolutionary War. He established outside the city, in the late 1700s, Haarlem estate, which had gardens and fruit orchards.

In the early 19th century Thomas Edmondson (1808-1856), the son of a prosperous local merchant, took over the property. Edmondson with nearby property-owners donated land to the city in 1857 to establish Lafayette Square, a new public park a few blocks northwest of Edmondson's home. During the American Civil War, Lafayette Square became Lafayette Barracks, a Union encampment. After major battles at Antietam and Gettysburg, Union soldiers from New York and Pennsylvania spent weeks recovering at Lafayette Barracks.

In 1867, Edmondson's heirs donated a portion of his estate to the city to form Harlem Square. In the 1870s and 1880s, the developer Joseph Cone erected hundreds of rowhouses in the blocks around Harlem Park that included modern amenities like gas lighting, hot water, and door bells.

In the early 1900s, white residents in Harlem Park fought to exclude African-Americans. By the 1920s, many black residents were able to acquire properties, and white residents moved away to newer nearby suburban communities like Rognel Heights and Walbrook. By the early 1930s, the neighborhood had largely transitioned to African-American residents. Middle class black doctors and lawyers lived alongside working-class blacks in boarding and alley houses.

Car ownership is very low. According to census data, as of 2024, over half of the households do not own a car. This compares with nearby Roland Park where only 7% of households are carless.

== Demographics ==
Historical population
Census	Pop.	Note	%±
2010	3,654		—
2020	2,582		−29.3%
Source: Baltimore Department of Planning

At the 2020 U.S. census, Harlem Park had a population of 2,582. Racially, it was 91% black or African American, 3% white, 3% of two races, 2% some other race, and 1% Asian. Hispanic or Latino people of any race comprised 3%. It had 1,788 housing units, of which 1,256 were occupied and 532 were vacant.

At the 2010 census, Harlem Park had a population of 3,654. 96% were black or African American, 1% were white, 1% were Asian, and 1% were of two or more races. 1% were Hispanic or Latino. Of its 2,648 housing units, 1,579 were occupied and 1,069 were vacant.

== See also ==
- Harlem Park Three
- Sellers Mansion
