= Carter County, Kentucky =

County in Kentucky, United States

- County
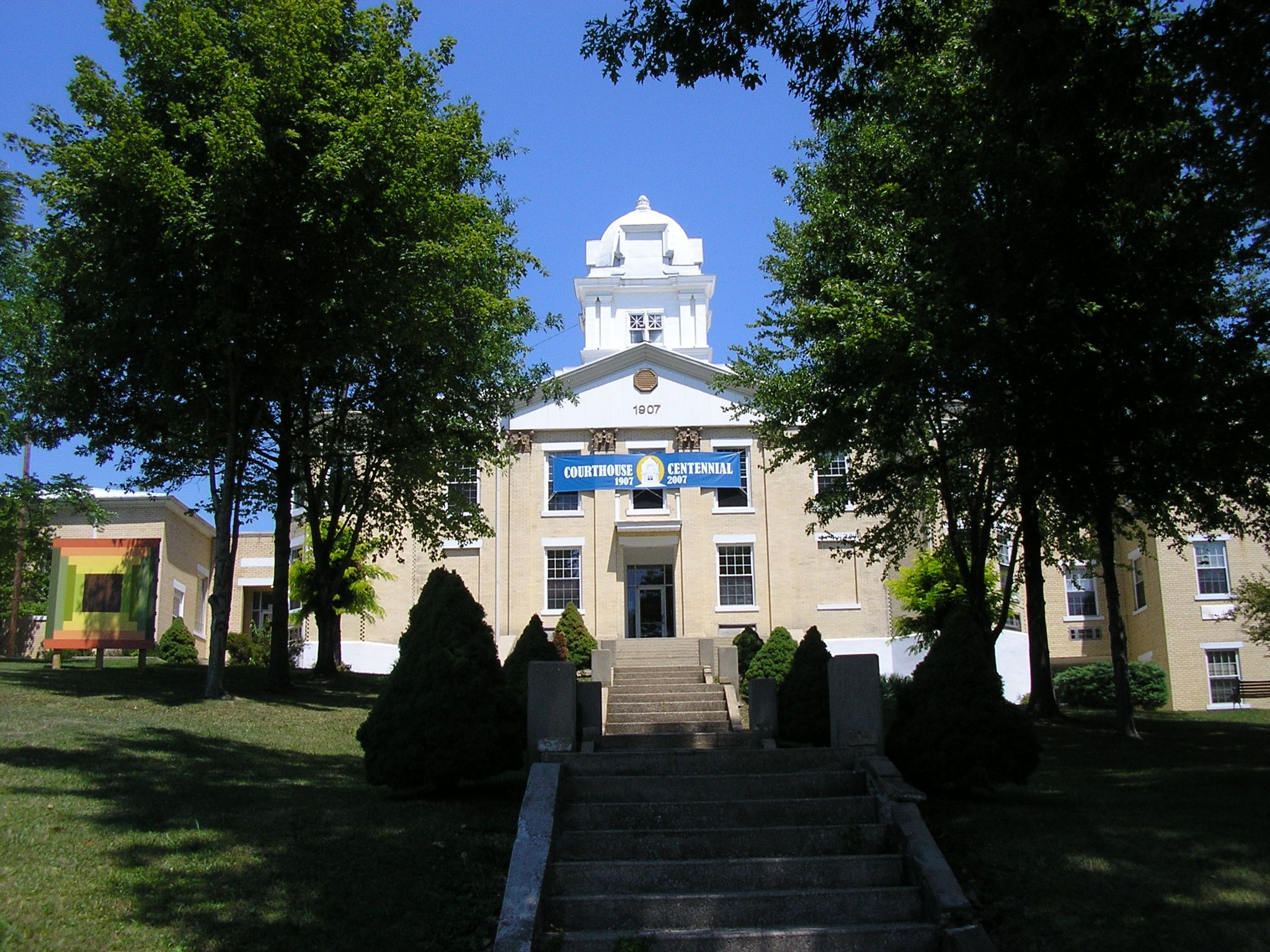
- Carter County courthouse in Grayson

- Location within the U.S. state of Kentucky
- Coordinates: 38°20′N 83°03′W
- Country: United States
- State: Kentucky
- Founded: 1838
- Named for: William Grayson Carter
- Seat: Grayson
- Largest city: Grayson

Government
  - Judge/Executive: Brandon Burton (R)

Area
  - Total: 412 sq mi (1,070 km^{2})
  - Land: 409 sq mi (1,060 km^{2})
  - Water: 2.6 sq mi (6.7 km^{2}) 0.6%

Population (2020)
  - Total: 26,627
  - Estimate (2025): 26,149 ▼
  - Density: 65.1/sq mi (25.1/km^{2})
- Time zone: UTC−5 (Eastern)
  - Summer (DST): UTC−4 (EDT)
- Congressional districts: 4th, 5th
- Website: cartercounty.ky.gov/Pages/default.aspx

Carter County is a county located in the U.S. state of Kentucky. As of the 2020 census, the population was 26,627. Its county seat is Grayson. Carter County is in the Huntington-Ashland, WV-KY-OH Metropolitan Statistical Area. It is home to Carter Caves State Resort Park.

== History ==
Carter County was formed on February 9, 1838, from portions of Greenup County and Lawrence County. It was named after Colonel William Grayson Carter, a Kentucky state Senator. The county seat is named for his uncle, Robert Grayson.

The original courthouse was rebuilt in 1907.

=== Railroads ===
An east–west main line reached Carter County in 1881 when the Elizabethtown, Lexington and Big Sandy Railroad (EL&BS) completed a through route between Lexington and Ashland; the last spike was driven near Denton, where the line met the Ashland Coal & Iron Railway coming east from Ashland. The Chesapeake & Ohio Railway (C&O) soon leased and then acquired the EL&BS, and the corridor became the C&O Lexington Subdivision.

The county's best-known station is the Olive Hill C&O Depot (1910), a Prairie-style brick passenger depot listed on the National Register of Historic Places in 1992 and noted as the only surviving railroad building in Olive Hill.

A north–south line, the Eastern Kentucky Railway (EK), served the county seat at Grayson and connected with the EL&BS/C&O at Hitchins; the EK's operations ended during the Great Depression.

Rail spurs and sidings in Carter County handled fire clay and refractory brick, which were major local industries in the early to mid-20th century. Facilities included plants at Olive Hill and Hitchins.

Most of the Lexington Subdivision west of Ashland was abandoned in the mid-1980s.

== Geography ==
According to the United States Census Bureau, the county has a total area of 412 square miles (1,070 km^{2}), of which 409 square miles (1,060 km^{2}) is land and 2.6 square miles (6.7 km^{2}) (0.6%) is water.

=== Adjacent counties ===
- Greenup County (northeast)
- Boyd County (east)
- Lawrence County (southeast)
- Elliott County (south)
- Rowan County (southwest)
- Lewis County (northwest)

== Demographics ==
Historical population
Census	Pop.	Note	%±
1840	2,905		—
1850	6,241		114.8%
1860	8,516		36.5%
1870	7,509		−11.8%
1880	12,345		64.4%
1890	17,204		39.4%
1900	20,228		17.6%
1910	21,966		8.6%
1920	22,474		2.3%
1930	23,839		6.1%
1940	25,545		7.2%
1950	22,559		−11.7%
1960	20,817		−7.7%
1970	19,850		−4.6%
1980	25,060		26.2%
1990	24,340		−2.9%
2000	26,889		10.5%
2010	27,720		3.1%
2020	26,627		−3.9%
2025 (est.)	26,149	▼	−1.8%
U.S. Decennial Census; 1790-1960 1900-1990; 1990-2000 2010-2021

=== 2020 census ===
As of the 2020 census, the county had a population of 26,627. The median age was 42.6 years. 22.0% of residents were under the age of 18 and 19.4% of residents were 65 years of age or older. For every 100 females there were 98.2 males, and for every 100 females age 18 and over there were 96.1 males age 18 and over.

The racial makeup of the county was 96.0% White, 0.8% Black or African American, 0.2% American Indian and Alaska Native, 0.2% Asian, 0.0% Native Hawaiian and Pacific Islander, 0.3% from some other race, and 2.4% from two or more races. Hispanic or Latino residents of any race comprised 1.0% of the population.

20.3% of residents lived in urban areas, while 79.7% lived in rural areas.

There were 10,664 households in the county, of which 29.2% had children under the age of 18 living with them and 26.7% had a female householder with no spouse or partner present. About 28.6% of all households were made up of individuals and 14.1% had someone living alone who was 65 years of age or older.

There were 12,206 housing units, of which 12.6% were vacant. Among occupied housing units, 75.7% were owner-occupied and 24.3% were renter-occupied. The homeowner vacancy rate was 1.1% and the rental vacancy rate was 9.0%.

=== 2000 census ===
As of the census of 2000, there were 26,889 people, 10,342 households, and 7,746 families residing in the county. The population density was 66 per square mile (25/km^{2}). There were 11,534 housing units at an average density of 28 per square mile (11/km^{2}). The racial makeup of the county was 99.02% White, 0.13% Black or African American, 0.25% Native American, 0.11% Asian, 0.08% from other races, and 0.41% from two or more races. 0.59% of the population were Hispanic or Latino of any race.

There were 10,342 households, out of which 33.50% had children under the age of 18 living with them, 60.50% were married couples living together, 10.70% had a female householder with no husband present, and 25.10% were non-families. 22.30% of all households were made up of individuals, and 9.80% had someone living alone who was 65 years of age or older. The average household size was 2.54 and the average family size was 2.95.

In the county, the population was spread out, with 24.50% under the age of 18, 10.80% from 18 to 24, 28.40% from 25 to 44, 23.80% from 45 to 64, and 12.50% who were 65 years of age or older. The median age was 36 years. For every 100 females there were 95.90 males. For every 100 females age 18 and over, there were 93.30 males.

The median income for a household in the county was $26,427, and the median income for a family was $31,278. Males had a median income of $28,690 versus $20,554 for females. The per capita income for the county was $13,442. About 19.20% of families and 22.30% of the population were below the poverty line, including 28.90% of those under age 18 and 21.30% of those age 65 or over.

== Politics ==
United States presidential election results for Carter County, Kentucky
Year	Republican		Democratic		Third party(ies)	
Year	No.	%	No.	%	No.	%
1912	1,174	28.64%	1,506	36.74%	1,419	34.62%
1916	2,818	58.48%	1,954	40.55%	47	0.98%
1920	4,595	61.98%	2,757	37.19%	62	0.84%
1924	4,472	61.50%	2,552	35.10%	247	3.40%
1928	5,342	68.73%	2,392	30.77%	39	0.50%
1932	4,376	48.51%	4,565	50.61%	79	0.88%
1936	4,372	55.98%	3,403	43.57%	35	0.45%
1940	4,520	56.88%	3,403	42.83%	23	0.29%
1944	4,117	60.01%	2,733	39.84%	10	0.15%
1948	3,472	52.61%	3,082	46.70%	46	0.70%
1952	4,221	58.12%	3,019	41.57%	22	0.30%
1956	5,127	62.09%	3,112	37.68%	19	0.23%
1960	4,956	58.76%	3,479	41.24%	0	0.00%
1964	2,821	40.37%	4,136	59.20%	30	0.43%
1968	3,234	49.67%	2,344	36.00%	933	14.33%
1972	4,082	60.68%	2,591	38.52%	54	0.80%
1976	3,185	44.65%	3,915	54.89%	33	0.46%
1980	3,934	50.18%	3,782	48.25%	123	1.57%
1984	4,656	53.67%	3,985	45.94%	34	0.39%
1988	4,325	48.36%	4,570	51.10%	49	0.55%
1992	3,305	38.61%	4,224	49.35%	1,031	12.04%
1996	3,240	41.69%	3,728	47.97%	803	10.33%
2000	4,617	51.53%	4,182	46.68%	160	1.79%
2004	5,422	48.77%	5,577	50.17%	118	1.06%
2008	5,252	53.52%	4,316	43.98%	245	2.50%
2012	5,279	59.26%	3,383	37.98%	246	2.76%
2016	7,587	73.82%	2,276	22.14%	415	4.04%
2020	8,775	75.74%	2,642	22.80%	169	1.46%
2024	8,981	78.63%	2,305	20.18%	136	1.19%

Carter County leaned increasingly Republican during the 2010s, with Donald Trump dramatically shifting it to the right in 2016. In 8 out of 28 presidential elections since 1912 has the Democratic candidate carried this county, even though they carried it three times in a row from 1988 to 1996. Mitch McConnell and Rand Paul are the senators currently representing the state of Kentucky. In the United States, senators are elected to 6-year terms with the terms for individual senators staggered.

=== Elected officials ===
Elected officials as of May 30, 2025
U.S. House	Thomas Massie (R)	KY 4
U.S. House	Hal Rogers (R)	KY 5
Ky. Senate	Robin L. Webb (R)	18
Ky. House	Patrick Flannery (R)	96

== Education ==
- Carter County School District
- Kentucky Christian University, located in Grayson. In 2022, they awarded 133 degrees. The student population was 629 - 388 male students and 241 female students. Demographics were White (93 and 73.8%), followed by Black or African American (16 and 12.7%), Unknown (8 and 6.35%), and Hispanic or Latino (7 and 5.56%).

== Alcohol sales ==
Carter County is a moist county, meaning that sale of alcohol in the county is prohibited except in certain areas as voted on by the residents of the area, with at least one area approving full retail alcohol sales. In the case of Carter County, alcohol sales are only permitted as follows:

- At a single approved winery in the Iron Hill precinct, near the unincorporated community of Carter City.
- Within the city of Grayson after a vote on June 11, 2013, approved full retail alcohol sales within the city limits by a vote of 511 in favor of alcohol sales to 393 against.
- Within the city of Olive Hill after a vote on March 10, 2014, approved full retail alcohol sales within the city limits by a vote of 257 in favor of alcohol sales to 206 against.

== Communities ==
=== Cities ===
- Grayson (county seat)
- Olive Hill

=== Unincorporated communities ===
- Access
- Beech Grove
- Beetle
- Boone Furnace
- Carter
- Davy Run
- Denton
- Grahn
- Hitchins
- Mount Savage
- Norton Branch
- Rooney
- Rush (part)
- Smiths Creek
- Soldier
- Straight Creek
- Willard

== Transportation ==
=== Major highways ===
- Interstate 64
- U.S. Route 60
- Kentucky Route 1
- Kentucky Route 2
- Kentucky Route 7
- AA Highway/Kentucky Route 9
- Kentucky Route 59
- Kentucky Route 67
- Kentucky Route 174
- Kentucky Route 182
- Kentucky Route 207
- Kentucky Route 209
- Kentucky Route 396
- Kentucky Route 474

Until 2010, the city of Olive Hill owned an airport.

== See also ==
- National Register of Historic Places listings in Carter County, Kentucky
