= Lafayette Square (Baltimore) =

Lafayette Square Baltimore
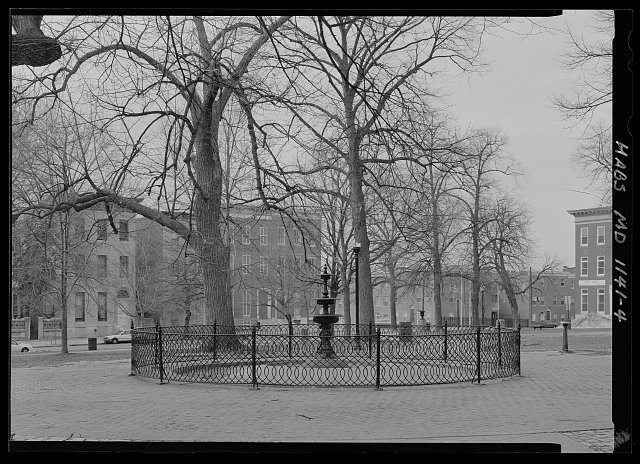
- Lafayette Square Park with fountain.

- Location within Maryland

Site notes
- Area: 2.88 acres (1.17 ha)
- Architectural styles: Italianate, Gothic Revival, Classical Revival
- Governing body: Local

Lafayette Square, is a historic city park and district in the Sandtown-Winchester area of West Baltimore, Maryland. It is bounded by Lanvale Street and Lafayette, Arlington, and Carrollton Avenues.

== History ==
=== 19th century ===
The area was intended for future development in Thomas Poppleton's 1822 plan for Baltimore city, although that plan did include the major streets which now border the park: Republican (now Carrollton), Wandsbeck (now Arlington), Lanvale and Townsend (now Lafayette). Before development began in the mid-19th century, the land was owned by W. Lorman, then Hoffman, Knell, Rice and Associates sold the land to the city in 1857.

The formation of Mt. Vernon Square led to the development of other squares in Baltimore: Lafayette Square, Franklin Square, Union Square, Ashland Square, Jackson Place, Madison Square, and the Battery. The City of Baltimore purchased the square in 1857 and laid out a Victorian park.

The American Civil War disrupted planting, and the area, known as Camp Hoffman, was used as an encampment for the Third Regiment Maryland Veteran Volunteers, as well as for Union troops from Delaware and New York, and as a refuge for runaway slaves.

In 1869, the barracks, hospital, and other government buildings in the area dating from the Civil War were removed and landscaping completed in the park at the center of the square. The park itself was designed in the Victorian style, with a fountain at the center (cast in Philadelphia in 1872), and eight radial paths leading to the corners, each anchored with a bronze urn on a stone pedestal. By 1881, a contemporary writer described the square as having a profusion of landscaping beds, with thirteen varieties of shrubbery such as coleus and flowers such as cannas, "attesting the skill with which the square is kept". Elegant Italianate dwellings and Gothic Revival churches were built facing the 2.88-acre (1.17 ha) park, and all sides had buildings by 1885.

The original developer of the area, the Lafayette Square Association, envisioned it as a residential area for the white middle class, and sought to create an elegant, neighborly and Christian environment. Thus, they invited congregations from four major Protestant denominations to build on the square, and one of its nicknames became "Square of the Churches". In 1866, Lafayette Square's developers convinced the Episcopal Church of the Ascension to move to the square, and soon congregations from three other denominations constructed elegant churches facing the park.

=== 20th century ===
By the 1920s, the area's demographics had changed, and many residents had gone to the new residential developments at Ten Hills (begun 1909) and Hunting Ridge (1920s). All but two of the residential properties in the district changed hands between 1910 and 1930, with middle-class African Americans moving into the neighborhood, close to the Druid Hill and Pennsylvania Avenue commercial districts.

Historic African American congregations bought the church buildings from the original four congregations whose members had moved outside of the city. The Ascension Church building remains, but its original congregation moved to Owings Mills and sold the property to a historic African American Episcopal congregation, St. James Episcopal Church, which moved in in 1932 and has since invested considerable money in improving the neighborhood, including helping to construct St. James Senior Apartments facing the square. Metropolitan AME led the way, with a symbolic march from its old Orchard Street church in 1928. Furthermore, the old State Normal School (closed in 1915 and later converted to school district offices) in 1931 became George Washington Carver Vocational-Technical High School, the first Maryland school to provide African-American students with vocational training. Soon, the park's nickname became "Harlem Park."

== Preservation efforts ==
The 19th century fountain no longer exists, and the paths have been rerouted, but almost all of the surrounding present-day buildings date from before 1885 (the only exception being the modern eldercare/apartment building).

Since 1977, the Lafayette Square Association, Inc., consisting of concerned homeowners and tenants living within two-blocks of the Square, has monitored development. The Friends of West Baltimore parks has also become involved in restoring the park. However, in 1989, the Enoch Pratt Free Library proposed to close its Lafayette Square branch because of budget cuts, so neighbors opened a one-room library in the multi-purpose center at 1515 W. Lafayette, which volunteers open several days a week instead.

The Maryland Historical Trust surveyed the area in 1992, and photographs were taken for the Historical American Buildings Survey and a local exhibition in 2004. In 2011, volunteer archeologists led by Baltimore Heritage and the Archeological Society of Maryland excavated in the park, searching for Civil War encampment relics.

== Notable structures and monuments ==
- Lafayette Square Presbyterian Church (now St. John's African Methodist Episcopal Church)
- Grace Methodist Episcopal Church and parish house (now Metropolitan Methodist Church)
- Episcopal Church of the Ascension (now St. James Episcopal Church)
- Cummins Memorial Church (now Emmanuel Christian Community Church)
- Sellers Mansion
