= Olive Hill, Kentucky =

Olive Hill, Kentucky.
- City
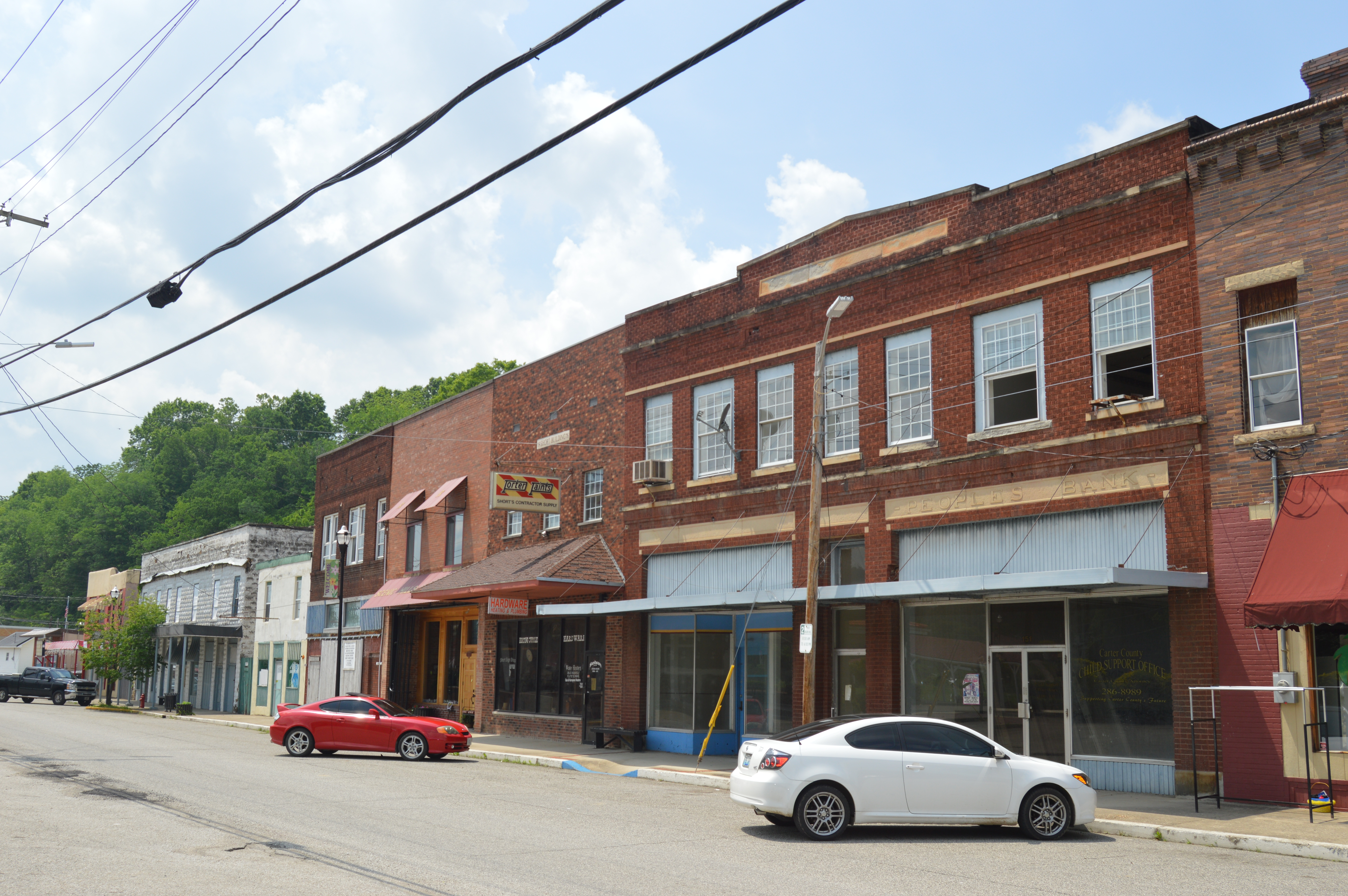
- Railroad Street
- Motto: "A nice place to call home"
- Location of Olive Hill in Carter County, Kentucky.
- Coordinates: 38°18′13″N 83°10′05″W
- Country: United States
- State: Kentucky
- County: Carter
- Incorporated: March 24, 1884

Government
  - Type: Mayor-Council
  - Mayor: Jerry Callihan

Area
  - Total: 2.02 sq mi (5.24 km^{2})
  - Land: 1.99 sq mi (5.15 km^{2})
  - Water: 0.031 sq mi (0.08 km^{2})
- Elevation: 843 ft (257 m)

Population (2020)
  - Total: 1,580
  - Estimate (2022): 1,555
  - Density: 794.0/sq mi (306.55/km^{2})
- Time zone: UTC-5 (Eastern (EST))
  - Summer (DST): UTC-4 (EDT)
- ZIP code: 41164
- Area code: 606
- FIPS code: 21-57918
- GNIS feature ID: 2404430
- Website: olivehill.ky.gov

Olive Hill is a home rule-class city along Tygarts Creek in Carter County, Kentucky, in the United States. As of the 2020 census, Olive Hill had a population of 1,580.

== History ==
Olive Hill began as a rural trading post established by the Henderson brothers in the first part of the 19th century. Although Olive Hill was allegedly named by Elias P. Davis for his friend Thomas Oliver, there is no evidence to support this popular contention. In 1881, the town was moved from a hillside location to the current location in the Tygarts Creek valley, where the Elizabethtown, Lexington, and Big Sandy Railroad had laid tracks. The hillside location become known as Old Olive Hill and now serves as the city's residential area. On March 24, 1884, Olive Hill incorporated as a city and served as the county seat of the short-lived Beckham County from February 9 to April 29, 1904.

The Chesapeake and Ohio Railway served Olive Hill and many other places on the railroad's Lexington Subdivision (running from Ashland to Lexington). The C&O merged into the Chessie System, which CSX Transportation later bought out, and after that CSX pulled up the railroad in the mid-1980s. Olive Hill retained and restored a passenger depot as well as a caboose ("John Hop Brown" Memorial Park).

According to George C. Wright in his A History of Blacks in Kentucky, volume 2, "In the small community of Olive Hill in 1917, several hundred white laborers at the brick-making General Refractories Company threatened to strike unless recently employed blacks were dismissed. After first refusing to meet with the leaders of the disgruntled workers, the company managers acceded to their demand and fired all the black workers,"(p. 14).

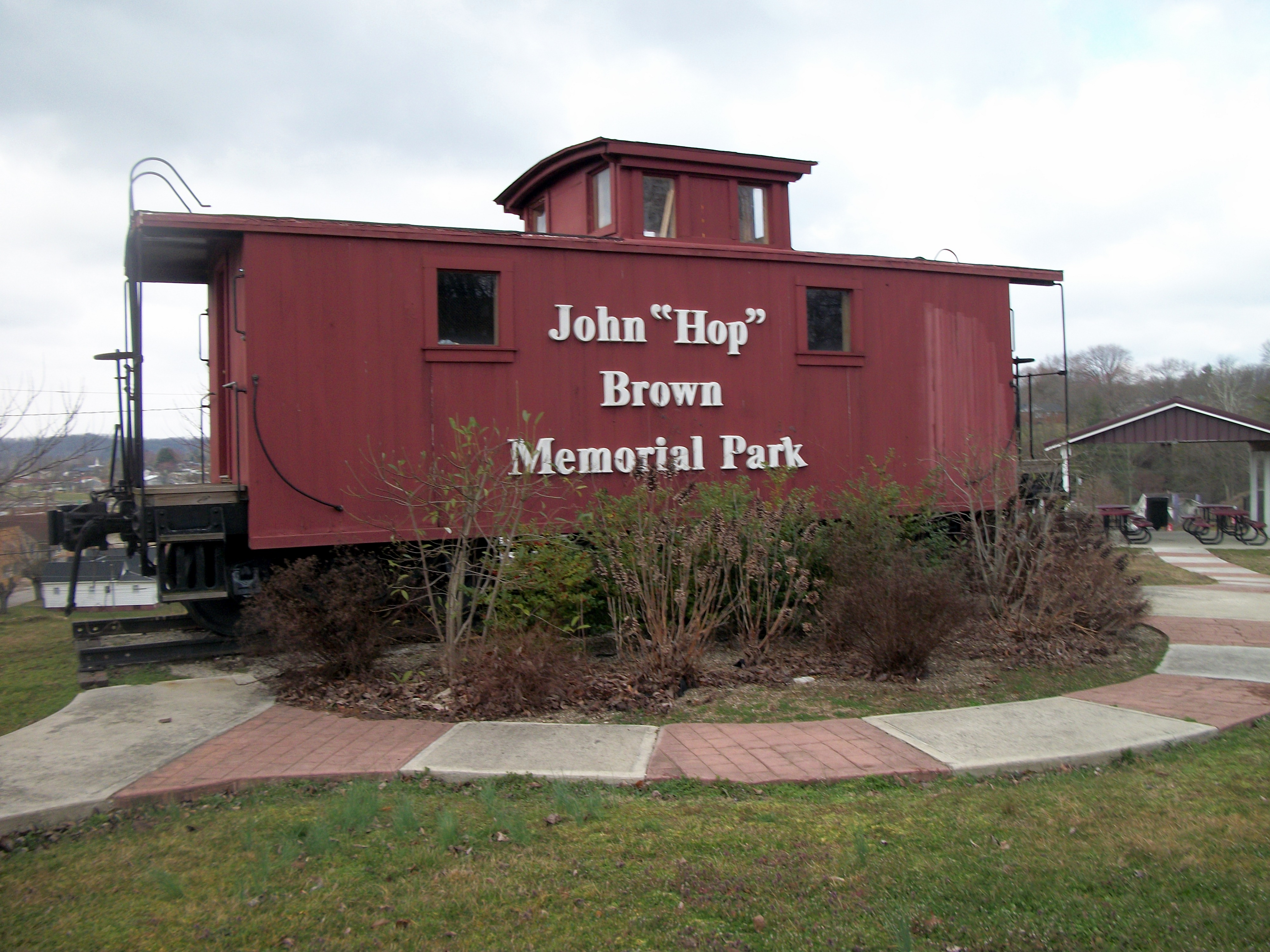
John "Hop" Brown Memorial park

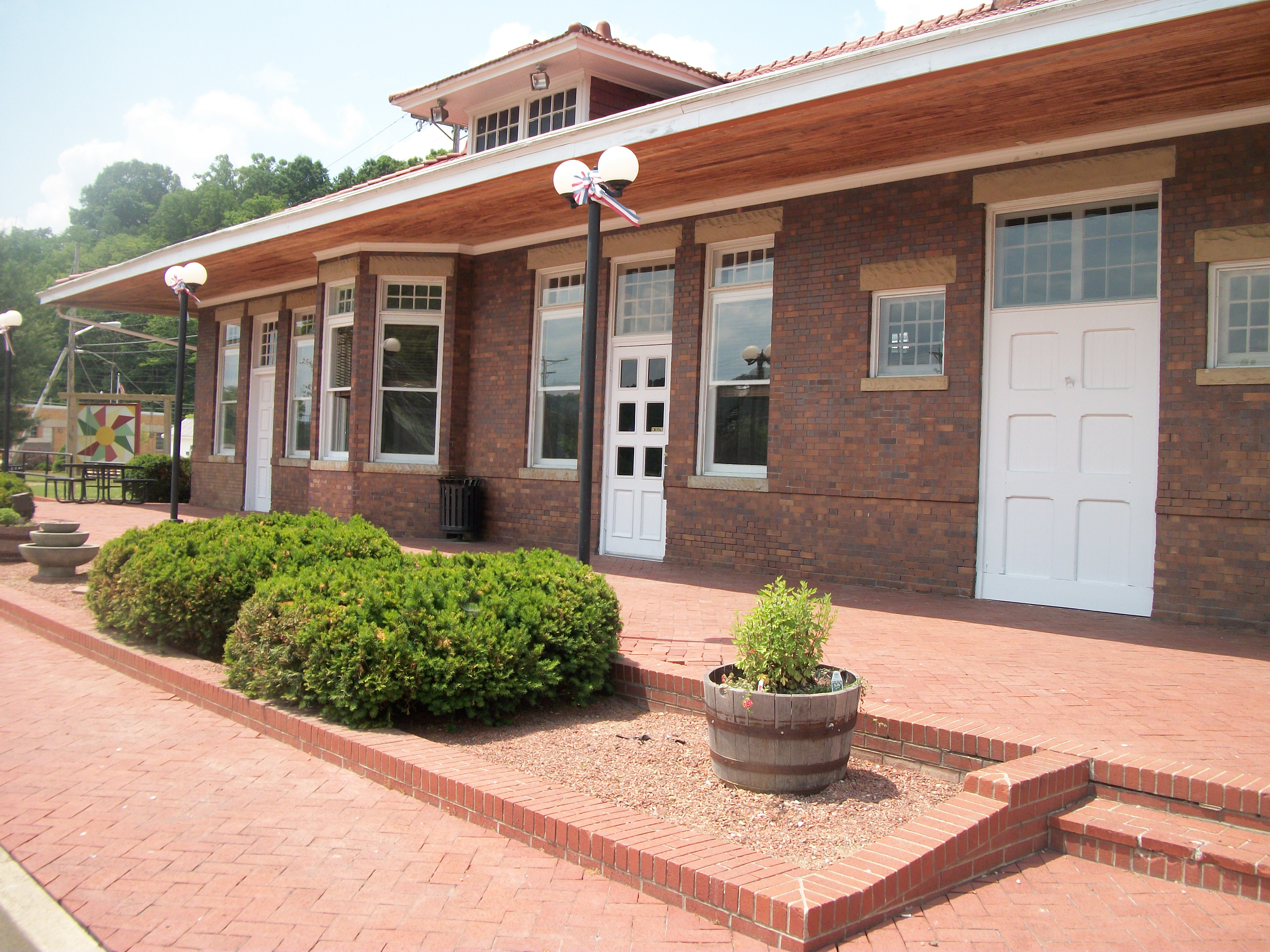
Preserved Passenger Depot

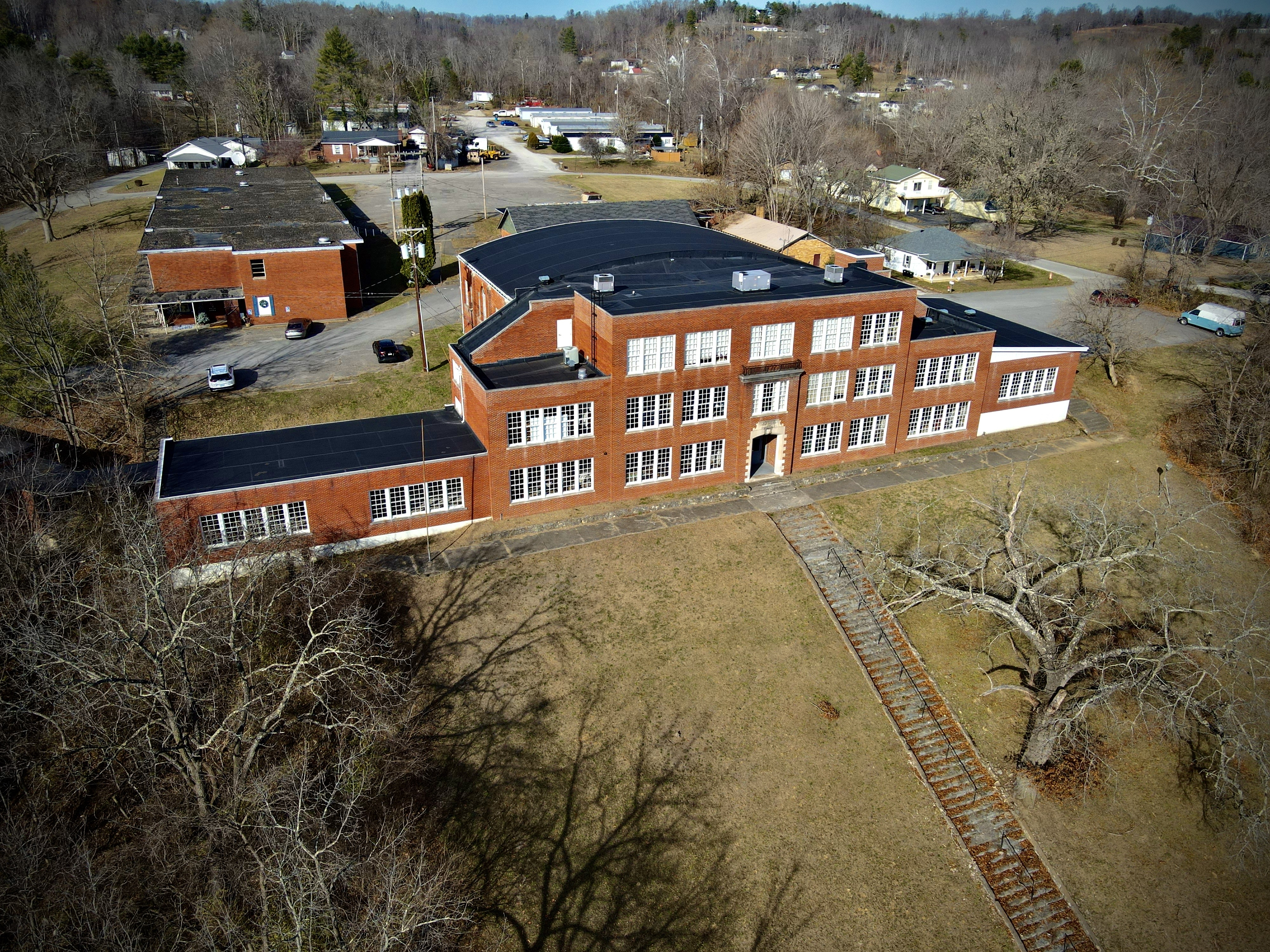
Aerial view of the Olive Hill High School campus, Nov. 2022.

== Geography ==
Olive Hill is located in western Carter County primarily on the north side of Tygarts Creek, a tributary of the Ohio River. U.S. Route 60 passes through the city, leading east 14 miles (23 km) to Grayson, the Carter County seat, and west 18 miles (29 km) to Morehead. Interstate 64 passes 3 miles (5 km) north of Olive Hill, leading east 44 miles (71 km) to Huntington, West Virginia, and west 84 miles (135 km) to Lexington.

According to the United States Census Bureau, Olive Hill has a total area of 1.8 square miles (4.7 km^{2}), of which 0.027 square miles (0.07 km^{2}), or 1.51%, is water.

== Demographics ==
Historical population
Census	Pop.	Note	%±
1880	56		—
1890	186		232.1%
1900	291		56.5%
1910	1,182		306.2%
1920	1,395		18.0%
1930	1,484		6.4%
1940	1,491		0.5%
1950	1,351		−9.4%
1960	1,398		3.5%
1970	1,197		−14.4%
1980	2,539		112.1%
1990	1,809		−28.8%
2000	1,813		0.2%
2010	1,599		−11.8%
2020	1,580		−1.2%
2022 (est.)	1,555		−1.6%
U.S. Decennial Census

=== 2020 census ===
As of the 2020 census, Olive Hill had a population of 1,580. The median age was 44.8 years. 20.9% of residents were under the age of 18 and 22.8% of residents were 65 years of age or older. For every 100 females there were 82.0 males, and for every 100 females age 18 and over there were 80.4 males age 18 and over.

0.0% of residents lived in urban areas, while 100.0% lived in rural areas.

There were 737 households in Olive Hill, of which 25.8% had children under the age of 18 living in them. Of all households, 35.8% were married-couple households, 18.3% were households with a male householder and no spouse or partner present, and 38.8% were households with a female householder and no spouse or partner present. About 41.0% of all households were made up of individuals and 20.9% had someone living alone who was 65 years of age or older.

There were 820 housing units, of which 10.1% were vacant. The homeowner vacancy rate was 0.0% and the rental vacancy rate was 12.8%.

Racial composition as of the 2020 census
Race	Number	Percent
White	1,540	97.5%
Black or African American	4	0.3%
American Indian and Alaska Native	0	0.0%
Asian	0	0.0%
Native Hawaiian and Other Pacific Islander	0	0.0%
Some other race	0	0.0%
Two or more races	36	2.3%
Hispanic or Latino (of any race)	9	0.6%

=== 2000 census ===
As of the census of 2000, there were 1,813 people, 791 households, and 488 families residing in the city. The population density was 904.1 people per square mile (349.1 people/km^{2}). There were 886 housing units at an average density of 441.8 per square mile (170.6/km^{2}). The racial makeup of the city was 98.73% White, 0.17% African American, 0.50% Native American, 0.11% from other races, and 0.50% from two or more races. Hispanic or Latino of any race were 0.61% of the population.

There were 791 households, out of which 26.5% had children under the age of 18 living with them, 44.5% were married couples living together, 14.5% had a female householder with no husband present, and 38.2% were non-families. 34.8% of all households were made up of individuals, and 18.6% had someone living alone who was 65 years of age or older. The average household size was 2.28 and the average family size was 2.93.

In the city, the population was spread out, with 24.5% under the age of 18, 8.3% from 18 to 24, 24.4% from 25 to 44, 24.4% from 45 to 64, and 18.4% who were 65 years of age or older. The median age was 39 years. For every 100 females, there were 83.7 males. For every 100 females age 18 and over, there were 78.0 males.

The median income for a household in the city was $22,958, and the median income for a family was $31,071. Males had a median income of $24,063 versus $19,191 for females. The per capita income for the city was $12,628. About 16.7% of families and 24.8% of the population were below the poverty line, including 35.1% of those under age 18 and 23.5% of those age 65 or over.

== Education ==
Public education in Olive Hill is administered by Carter County School District, which operates Olive Hill Elementary School, West Carter Middle School, and West Carter High School.

Olive Hill has a public library, a branch of the Carter County Public Library, housed on the third floor of the former Olive Hill High School.

== Notable people ==
Olive Hill is the birthplace of country music singer and writer Tom T. Hall (The Story Teller), a fact that is noted on the "Welcome to Olive Hill" signs on the edges of town.

== See also ==
- C&O Lexington Subdivision
- Olive Hill High School
- Other places named Olive Hill
