= John J. Mooney (horse racing) =

John J. Mooney (September 7, 1924 - December 3, 1994) was a Canadian horse racing executive and breeder who served as president of the Ontario Jockey Club, Canadian Thoroughbred Horse Society, Laurel Park Racecourse, and Arlington Park.

== Early life and career ==
Mooney was born on September 7, 1924, in Toronto, Ontario. Growing up, Mooney traveled with his family. He attended some 36 schools and spent his summers working at racetracks where his father, J. D. Mooney rode.

Mooney served in the Royal Canadian Air Force during World War II. After the war, he worked full-time in the racing secretary's office at tracks in Ontario and was a patrol judge and minor official at Tropical Park and Oaklawn Park Race Track. He later served as Oaklawn's assistant general manager.

== Ontario Jockey Club ==
In the early 1950s, Mooney was hired by E. P. Taylor and George C. Hendrie to join the management team of the Ontario Jockey Club while the organization was working to reorganize Ontario racing. This reorganization culminated with the opening of Woodbine Racetrack on June 12, 1956.

In 1957 he was named general manager of the Ontario Jockey Club. From 1971 to 1975 he was the OJC's president. During his tenure, the Canadian International Stakes became a race of worldwide importance. Its 1973 running served as the farewell race for Secretariat.

In 1962 Mooney was named president of the Canadian Thoroughbred Horse Society, a Toronto-based organization that assists thoroughbred horse breeders. In 1963 he helped form the National Association of Canadian Race Tracks. In 1972 he succeeded E. P. Taylor as a director of the Thoroughbred Racing Associations.

Mooney also raced horses under the stable name O'Maonaigh Abu (Gaelic for "Mooney Forever").

== Later career ==
Mooney left the OJC to develop Nashville Stud, a stud farm he owned near Kleinburg. It was the only farm in Canada to provide both thoroughbred and standardbred stallions. In 1978 he served as director of racing operations at Stampede Park in Calgary. From 1980 to 1981 he was president and general manager of Laurel Park Racecourse. From 1981 to 1983 he was the president of Arlington Park. He later served as director of the United Totalisator Company.

In 1989 he was inducted into the Canadian Horse Racing Hall of Fame as a builder.

== Personal life ==
Mooney's father J. D. Mooney won the 1924 Kentucky Derby on Black Gold, the 1929 King's Plate on Shorelint, and trained 1962 Canadian Horse of the Year Crafty Lace. His brother, Paul A. Mooney was the president of the Boston Bruins.

Mooney's sons, John Mooney and Mike Mooney, are also involved in thoroughbred racing.

== Death ==
Mooney died on December 3, 1994, of a heart attack while driving home after attending races at Woodbine.
