= 2020 Road to the Kentucky Derby =

Series of horse races

The 2020 Road to the Kentucky Derby was a series of races through which horses qualified for the 2020 Kentucky Derby, which was held on September 5 (rescheduled from the traditional first Saturday in May due to the coronavirus pandemic). The field for the Derby is limited to 20 horses, with up to four 'also eligibles' in case of a late withdrawal from the field. There are three separate paths for horses to take to qualify for the Derby: the main Road consisting of races in North America (plus one in Dubai), the Japan Road consisting of four races in Japan, and the European Road with seven European races in England, Ireland and France. The top four finishers in the specified races receive points, with higher points awarded in the major prep races. Earnings in non-restricted stakes races act as a tie breaker.

When originally announced in September 2019, the main Road to the Kentucky Derby would have remained substantially the same as the 2019 Road to the Kentucky Derby, consisting of 35 races, 19 races for the Kentucky Derby Prep Season and 16 races for the Kentucky Derby Championship Season. Fair Grounds Race Course subsequently made minor changes to the length of the three qualifying races that it hosts: the Lecomte Stakes goes from a mile and 70 yards to 1 1/16 miles, the Risen Star from 1 1/16 to 1 1/8 miles, and the Louisiana Derby goes from 1 1/8 to 1 3/16 miles. However, in March 2020, the growing coronavirus pandemic prompted the cancellation of several prep races, and the rescheduling of the Derby itself. Churchill Downs added more qualifying races to the series in May which became known as the Extended Series.

== Main Road to the Kentucky Derby ==
=== Standings ===
The following table shows the points earned in the eligible races for the main series. The ranking is for horses that are still pointing towards the race, as shown on the Derby Leaderboard published by Churchill Downs on August 22, updated for subsequently announced withdrawals from the field.

Authentic, who was the eventual winner of the Kentucky Derby, qualified for the race in second place by winning the Haskell, Sham and San Felipe, plus finishing second in the Santa Anita Derby.

Rank (Note: The ranking shown is based on the)	Horse	Points	Earnings (Note: Earnings from non-restricted stakes prior to the running of the Kentucky Derby serve as a tie-breaker.)	Trainer	Owner	Ref
1	Tiz the Law	372	$1,972,400	Barclay Tagg	Sackatoga Stable	
**2**	**Authentic**	**200**	**$980,000**	**Bob Baffert**	**Spendthrift Farm, MyRaceHorse Stable, Madaket Stables & Starlight Racing** (Note: Authentic's original ownership group was SF Racing, Starlight Racing, Madaket Stables, F. Hertrich III, J. Fielding and Golconda Stables)	
retired (Note: Nadal was retired after sustaining a condylar fracture)	Nadal	150	$1,020,000	Bob Baffert	George Bolton, Arthur Hoyeau, Barry Lipman & Mark Mathiesen	
injured	Art Collector	150	$476,461	Thomas Drury Jr.	Bruce Lunsford	
3	Honor A. P.	140	$340,000	John Shirreffs	C R K Stable	
bypassing	Basin	110	$592,500	Steve Asmussen	Jackpot Farm	
4	Ny Traffic	110	$472,820	Saffie Joseph Jr.	John Fanelli, Cash is King, LC Racing & Paul Braverman	
injured (Note: Wells Bayou sustained ankle bruising and is off the Kentucky Derby trail)	Wells Bayou	104	$765,000	Brad Cox	Lance and Clint Gasaway	
5	King Guillermo (Note: Originally King Guillermo was not nominated for the Triple Crown, but after his victory in the Tampa Bay Derby connections paid the late payment fee for nomination)	90	$317,050	Juan Carlos Avila	Victoria's Ranch	
6	Thousand Words	83	$297,000	Bob Baffert	Albaugh Family Stables & Spendthrift Farm	
bypassing	Dr Post	80	$331,035	Todd Pletcher	St. Elias Stable	
bypassing	Ete Indien	74	$357,156	Patrick L. Biancone	Linda Shanahan, Sanford Bacon, Dream With Me Stable, Horse France America, D P Racing & Patrick L. Biancone Racing	
bypassing	Modernist	70	$369,000	William I. Mott	Pam & Martin Wygod	
injured (Note: Maxfield has suffered a condylar fracture and off the Kentucky Derby trail)	Maxfield	60	$388,350	Brendan Walsh	Godolphin Stables	
7	Max Player	60	$337,500	Steve Asmussen	George E. Hall & SportBLX Thoroughbreds	
injured	Caracaro	60	$205,000	Gustavo Delgado	Top Racing, Global Thoroughbreds	
ill (Note: Gouverneur Morris was diagnosed with colitis in June and was taken out of training to give him time to recover)	Gouverneur Morris	54	$236,000	Todd Pletcher	Team Valor & WinStar Farm	
injured	Mr. Monomoy	52	$260,000	Brad Cox	Madaket Stables, Michael Dubb, Doheny Racing Stable	
bypassing	Mischevious Alex	50	$324,910	John Servis	Cash is King & LC Racing	
bypassing	Country Grammer	50	$106,400	Chad Brown	Paul Pompa Jr.	
bypassing	Pneumatic (Note: Originally Pneumatic was not nominated for the Triple Crown, but his connections paid the late payment fee for nomination)	45	$169,250	Steve Asmussen	Winchell Thoroughbreds	
8	Enforceable	43	$314,550	Mark Casse	John C. Oxley	
bypass (Note: The filly qualified for entry to the Kentucky Derby, but her trainer confirmed they would run in the Kentucky Oaks)	Swiss Skydiver	40	$901,820	Kenneth McPeek	Peter J. Callahan	
bypassing	Shivaree	40	$311,905	Ralph Nicks	Jacks or Better Farm	
bypassing	Rushie	40	$108,000	Michael McCarthy	Jim Daniell & Donna Daniel	
9	Major Fed	38	$179,100	Greg Foley	Lloyd Madison Farms	
10	Storm the Court	36	$1,273,851	Peter Eurton	David A Bernsen, Exline-Border Racing, D. Hudock, S. Wilson	
11	Attachment Rate	35	$93,675	Dale Romans	Jim Bakke & Gerald Isbister	
bypassing	Anneau d'Or	32	$435,821	Blaine Wright	Peter Redekop	
12	Sole Volante	30	$273,510	Patrick L. Biancone	Reeves Thoroughbred Racing, Andie Biancone & Limelight Stables	
13	Finnick the Fierce	25	$120,200	Rey Hernandez	Arnaldo Monge & Rey Hernandez	
bypassing	Silver Prospector	21	$664,018	Steve Asmussen	Ed & Susie Orr	
not nominated	Field Pass	20	$229,960	Michael J. Maker	Three Diamond Farms	
bypassing	Excession	20	$206,000	Steve Asmussen	Calumet Farm	
bypassing	Candy Tycoon	20	$83,500	Todd Pletcher	Mathis Stable	
bypassing	Untitled	20	$81,999	Mark Casse	Gary Barber & Michael B. Sebastian	
14	Winning Impressions (Note: Winning Impressions was a late nominee)	20	$54,822	Dallas Stewart	West Point Thoroughbreds & Pearl Racing	
bypassing	Shotski	19	$212,466	Jeremiah O'Dwyer	Wachtel Stable, Gary Barber, Pantofel Stable & M. Karty	
15	South Bend (Note: South Bend's connections originally planned to bypass the race, but changed their mind in the final week)	18	$291,902	William I. Mott	Gary Barber, Adam Watchtel, Peter Deutsch, Leonard Schleifer	
not nominated	Jesus' Team	18	$80,000	Jose D'Angelo	Group 7 Racing	
bypassing	Farmington Road	15	$101,000	Todd Pletcher	Eclipse Thoroughbreds, Chrysalia Stables & Robert LaPenta	
bypassing (Note: Connections of Independence Hall has decided to bypass the Kentucky Derby trail)	Independence Hall	14	$226,600	Michael J. Trombetta	Eclipse Thoroughbred Partners, Twin Creeks Racing Stables, Kathleen and Robert Verratti	
bypassing	Silver State	14	$90,000	Steve Asmussen	Winchell Thoroughbreds & Willis Horton Racing	
bypassing	Azul Coast	14	$80,500	Bob Baffert	Karl Watson, Mike Pegram, Paul Weitman	
16	Necker Island	14	$74,808	Chris Hartman	Raymond Daniels & Wayne Scherr	
bypassing	Shoplifted	13	$388,500	Steve Asmussen	Grandview Equine, Cheyenne Stables & LNJ Foxwoods	
bypassing	Eight Rings	10	$200,351	Bob Baffert	SF Racing, Starlight Racing, Madaket Stables, Freferick Hertrich III, John D. Fielding, Golconda Stables	
bypassing (Note: Dennis' Moment is not in consideration for the Kentucky Derby)	Dennis' Moment	10	$141,800	Dale Romans	Albaugh Family Stables	
bypassing	Gold Street	10	$141,000	Steve Asmussen	Mike McCarty	
bypassing	As Seen On Tv	10	$80,100	Kelly Breen	Screen Door Stables	
not nominated	Texas Swing	10	$35,000	Todd Pletcher	Harrell Ventures	
bypassing	Three Technique	9	$80,000	Jeremiah Englehart	August Dawn Farm	
bypassing	Invader	8	$107,140	Wesley Ward	Grandview Equine, Cheyenne Stables & LNJ Foxwoods	
bypassing	Ajaaweed	7	$95,000	Kiaran McLaughlin	Shadwell Stable	
bypassing	Scabbard	6	$186,000	Eddie Kenneally	Joseph Sutton	
bypassing	Answer In	6	$155,000	Brad Cox	Robert LaPenta & Madaket Stables	
bypassing	Relentless Dancer	6	$29,750	Michael J. Maker	Paradise Farms, Terry Raymond, Jana Wagner	
bypassing	Wrecking Crew	5	$301,000	Peter L. Miller	Rockingham Ranch & David Bernsen	
bypassing	Montauk Traffic	5	$73,000	Linda L. Rice	Chris Fountoukis	
bypassing	Mailman Money	5	$16,000	Bret Calhoun	Allied Racing Stable	
bypassing	Green Light Go	4	$224,550	James Jerkens	Stronach Stables	
bypassing	High Velocity	4	$97,000	Bob Baffert	Mary & Gary West	
bypassing	American Theorem	4	$66,667	George Papaprodromou	Kretz Racing	
bypassing	Royal Act	4	$31,644	Peter Eurton	C R K Stable	
bypassing	Fancy Liquor	4	$23,500	Michael J. Maker	Skychai Racing & Sand Dollar Stable	
not nominated	American Farmer	4	$20,000	Steve Sherman	BKB Stables & Steve Sherman	
bypassing	Prince of Pharoahs	3	$27,750	Linda L. Rice	Darlene Bilinski & Harry Patten	
bypassing	Bourbon Bay	3	$24,000	Mark A. Hennig	Bourbon Lane Stable, Seidman Stables, Lake Lonely Racing	
bypassing	Lebda (Note: Originally Lebda was not nominated for the Triple Crown, but his connections paid the late payment fee for nomination)	2	$150,125	Claudio Gonzalez	Joseph Besecker	
bypassing	Big City Bob	2	$123,000	Jorge Duarte Jr.	Colts Neck Stables	
not nominated	Embolden	2	$82,000	Michael Stidham	Dare To Dream Stable	
bypassing	Chase Tracker	2	$51,700	Todd Pletcher	St. Elias Stable	
bypassing	Portos	2	$30,000	Todd Pletcher	Wertheimer et Frère	
bypassing	Toledo (Note: Toledo is ahead of Zimba Warrior in the standings due to higher stakes earned from non-restricted stakes)	2	$24,500	Chad C. Brown	Juddmonte Farms	
bypassing	Zimba Warrior	2	$24,500	J. Keith Desormeaux	Charles & Cynthia Marquis	
not nominated	Indian Peak	2	$16,500	Quinn Howey	Jill & William Gray	
bypassing	Halo Again	2	$11,400	Steve Asmussen	Winchell Thoroughbreds & Willis Horton Racing	
bypassing	Jungle Runner	1	$87,250	Steve Asmussen	Calumet Farm	
bypassing	Monday Morning Qb	1	$75,000	Butch Reid Jr.	Cash is King and LC Racing	
not nominated	Gozilla	1	$72,000	Steve Asmussen	Zayat Stables	
bypassing	Taishan	1	$51,000	Richard Baltas	Calvin Nguyen & Joey Tran	
bypassing	Informative	1	$38,000	Uriah St. Lewis	Uriah St. Lewis	
bypassing	Letmeno	1	$29,200	Ian Wilkes	Randall Bloch & Six Column Stables	
bypassing	Express Train	1	$18,000	John Shirreffs	C R K Stable	
not nominated	Celtic Striker	1	$12,000	Raymond Handal	Imperial Racing	
bypassing	Tiz Rye Time	1	$10,000	Ian Wilkes	Bourbon Lane Stable, Cleber J. Massey, Jim Gladden	
bypassing	Tizamagician (Note: Tizamagician is ahead of Wine and Whiskey in the standings due to higher stakes earned from non-restricted stakes)	1	$6,000	Richard Mandella	MyRacehorse.com & Spendthrift Farm	
not nominated	Wine and Whiskey	1	$6,000	Felix Rondan	Ruben Arechiga & Felix Rondan	
ill	Shirl's Speight	0 (Note: Shirl's Speight did not earn points on the Road, but became eligible for the race when there was still a position left in the starting gate after all point earners had made their decision about whether or not to enter. He was the top ranked non-points earner based on his graded stakes earnings from the Marine Stakes in Canada)	$55,896	Roger Attfield	Charles Fipke	
17	Money Moves	0 (Note: Money Moves did not earn points on the Road, but became eligible for the race when there was still a position left in the starting gate after all point earners and graded stakes earners had made their decision about whether or not to enter.)	0	Todd Pletcher	Robert LaPenta & Bortolazzo Stable	

- Winner of Kentucky Derby in **bold**
- Sidelined/Inactive/No longer under Derby Consideration/Not nominated in gray

=== Prep season ===
Note: 1st=10 points; 2nd=4 points; 3rd=2 points; 4th=1 point (except the Breeders' Cup Juvenile: 1st=20 points; 2nd=8 points; 3rd=4 points; 4th=2 points)

Race	Distance	Purse	Track	Date	1st	2nd	3rd	4th	Ref
Iroquois	1 1/16 miles	$200,000	Churchill Downs	Sep 14 2019	Dennis' Moment	Scabbard	Lebda	Letmeno	
American Pharoah	1 1/16 miles	$301,404	Santa Anita	Sep 27 2019	Eight Rings	American Theorem	Storm the Court	Express Train	
Champagne	1 mile	$500,000	Belmont	Oct 5 2019	Tiz the Law	Green Light Go	Big City Bob	Gozilla	
Breeders' Futurity	1 1/16 miles	$500,000	Keeneland	Oct 5 2019	Maxfield	Gouverneur Morris	Enforcable	Ajaaweed	
Breeders' Cup Juvenile	1 1/16 miles	$2,000,000	Santa Anita	Nov 1 2019	Storm the Court	Anneau D'or	Wrecking Crew	Scabbard	
Kentucky Jockey Club	1 1/16 miles	$300,000	Churchill Downs	Nov 30 2019	Silver Prospector	Finnick the Fierce	Tiz the Law	Enforceable	
Remsen	1 1/8 miles	$250,000	Aqueduct	Dec 7 2019	Shotski	Ajaaweed	Chase Tracker	Informative	
Los Alamitos Futurity	1 1/16 miles	$200,000	Los Alamitos	Dec 7 2019	Thousand Words	Anneau D'or	High Velocity	Wrecking Crew	
Springboard Mile	1 mile	$400,000	Remington	Dec 15 2019	Shoplifted	Answer In	Embolden	Jungle Runner	
Jerome	1 mile	$150,000	Aqueduct	Jan 1 2020	Independence Hall	Prince of Pharoahs and Bourbon Bay (Note: Dead heat for second place, both horses received three qualification points)		Celtic Striker	
Sham	1 mile	$100,000	Santa Anita	Jan 4 2020	Authentic	Azul Coast	Zimba Warrior	Taishan	
Lecomte	1 1/16 miles	$200,000	Fair Grounds	Jan 18 2020	Enforceable	Silver State	Mr. Monomoy	Finnick the Fierce	
Smarty Jones	1 mile	$150,000	Oaklawn	Jan 24 2020	Gold Street	Three Technique	Shoplifted	Silver Prospector	
Holy Bull	1 1/16 miles	$350,000	Gulfstream	Feb 1 2020	Tiz the Law	Ete Indien	Toledo	Relentless Dancer	
Withers	1 1/8 miles	$250,000	Aqueduct	Feb 1 2020	Max Player	Shotski	Portos	Monday Morning Qb	
Robert B. Lewis	1 1/16 miles	$150,000	Santa Anita	Feb 1 2020	Thousand Words	Royal Act	High Velocity	Tizamagician	
Sam F. Davis Stakes	1 1/16 miles	$250,000	Tampa Bay	Feb 8 2020	Sole Volante	Independence Hall	Ajaaweed	Tiz Rye Time	
El Camino Real Derby	1 1/8 miles	$100,000	Golden Gate	Feb 15 2020	Azul Coast	American Farmer	Indian Peak	Wine and Whisky	
Southwest	1 1/16 miles	$750,000	Oaklawn	Feb 17 2020	Silver Prospector	Wells Bayou	Answer In	Shoplifted	

=== Championship series events ===
==== First leg of series ====
Note: 1st=50 points; 2nd=20 points; 3rd=10 points; 4th=5 points

Race	Distance	Purse	Grade	Track	Date	1st	2nd	3rd	4th	Ref
Risen Star Stakes (Note: Racing officials split the event into two divisions after the number of entries entered exceeded the number for one event)	1 1/8 miles	$400,000	2	Fair Grounds	Feb 15 2020	Mr. Monomoy	Enforceable	Silver State	Farmington Road	Division 1
Risen Star Stakes	1 1/8 miles	$400,000	2	Fair Grounds	Feb 15 2020	Modernist	Major Fed	Ny Traffic	Mailman Money	Division 2
Fountain of Youth	1 1/16 miles	$400,000	2	Gulfstream Park	Feb 29 2020	Ete Indien	Candy Tycoon	As Seen On Tv	Shotski	
Tampa Bay Derby	1 1/16 miles	$400,000	2	Tampa Bay	Mar 7 2020	King Guillermo	Sole Volante	Texas Swing	Relentless Dancer	
Gotham Stakes	1 mile	$300,000	3	Aqueduct	Mar 7 2020	Mischevious Alex	Untitled	Attachment Rate	Montauk Traffic	
San Felipe Stakes	1 1/16 miles	$401,000	2	Santa Anita	Mar 7 2020	Authentic	Honor A.P.	Storm the Court	Thousand Words	
Rebel Stakes	1 1/16 miles	$1,000,000	2	Oaklawn	Mar 14 2020	Nadal	Excession	Basin	Three Technique	
Sunland Derby	1 1/8 miles	$700,000	3	Sunland Park	Mar 22 2020	Cancelled (Note: Due to the COVID-19 pandemic in the United States the administration of Sunland Park cancelled the event)				

==== Second leg of series ====
These races are the major preps for the Kentucky Derby, and are thus weighted more heavily. Additional races are scheduled to be added in the summer as to make up for cancelled races towards the September 5 Derby. Note: 1st=100 points; 2nd=40 points; 3rd=20 points; 4th=10 points

Race	Distance	Purse	Grade	Track	Date	1st	2nd	3rd	4th	Ref
Louisiana Derby	1 3/16 miles	$1,000,000	2	Fair Grounds	Mar 21 2020	Wells Bayou	Ny Traffic	Modernist	Major Fed	
UAE Derby	1,900 metres (~1 3/16 miles)	$2,500,000	2	Meydan	Mar 28 2020	Cancelled (Note: Due to the COVID-19 pandemic in the United Arab Emirates the administration of Meydan Racetrack cancelled the World Cup meeting)				
Florida Derby	1 1/8 miles	$750,000 (Note: Originally the purse for the Florida Derby was $1,100,000 but due to the COVID-19 pandemic in the United States the administration of Gulfstream Park lowered the purse as the race was run behind closed doors while the accompany casino was closed.)	1	Gulfstream Park	Mar 28 2020	Tiz the Law	Shivaree	Ete Indien	Gouverneur Morris	
Wood Memorial	1 1/8 miles	$1,000,000	2	Aqueduct	Apr 4 2020	Cancelled (Note: Originally scheduled for 4 April but due to the COVID-19 pandemic in the United States, NYRA postponed racing at Aqueduct indefinitely. The event was not rescheduled.)				
Blue Grass Stakes	1 1/8 miles	$600,000	2	Keeneland	Moved to Extended Season (Note: Due to the COVID-19 pandemic in the United States the administration of Keeneland cancelled the Spring meeting between April 2–24 including the Blue Grass Stakes The event was moved to the Extended series events.)					
Arkansas Derby (Division 1) (Note: The event was split into two division after 22 entries were nominated as a result of race cancellations caused by the COVID-19 pandemic in the United States. Each division would carry a purse of $500,000 as the track was prepared to commit an additional $250,000 to the initial reduced $750,000 purse. Additionally, 20 entries were to be entered so that the split into divisions would occur. Qualification points for the first four finishers would be not be adjusted.)	1 1/8 miles	$497,500	1	Oaklawn Park	May 2, 2020 (Note: Due to the COVID-19 pandemic in the United States the administration of Oaklawn Park moved the Arkansas Derby from April 4 and lowered the purse from $1 million to $750,000 as the race is run behind closed doors. When the track announced that the event would be split into two divisions the purse returned to $1 million, with each division having a $500,000 purse.)	Charlatan (Note: Charlatan crossed the finish line first but was subsequently disqualified for a test positive of lidocaine. The placings for the race were subsequently adjusted and the qualifying points were redistributed to the horses that ran behind him: Basin, Gouverneur Morris, Winning Impression & Anneau d'Or However, after an appeal was lodged the Arkansas Racing Commission on 20 April 2021 ruled on restoring the original result. The disqualification was later overturned on appeal.)	Basin	Gouverneur Morris	Winning Impression	
Arkansas Derby (Division 2)	1 1/8 miles	$500,000	1	Oaklawn Park	May 2, 2020	Nadal	King Guillermo	Finnick the Fierce	Farmington Road	
Santa Anita Derby	1 1/8 miles	$400,000	1	Santa Anita	Moved to Extended Season (Note: Originally scheduled for 4 April but due to the COVID-19 pandemic in the United States, the administration of the track with instructions received from Los Angeles County Health Department postponed racing at Santa Anita until further notice. On 30 April Santa Anita Park administration announced the reopening of the track on May 15 with the rescheduling of Santa Anita Derby to 6 June. The event was moved to the Extended series events.)					

==== 'Wild Card' events ====
Note: 1st=20 points; 2nd=8 points; 3rd=4 points; 4th=2 points

Race	Distance	Purse	Track	Date	1st	2nd	3rd	4th	Ref
Jeff Ruby Steaks	1 1/8 miles	$250,000	Turfway	Mar 14 2020	Field Pass	Invader	Fancy Liquor	Halo Again	
Lexington Stakes	1 1/8 miles	$200,000	Keeneland	Apr 11 2020	Cancelled (Note: Due to the COVID-19 pandemic in the United States the administration of Keeneland cancelled the Spring meeting including the Lexington Stakes)				

=== Extended series events ===
The following races were announced for the extension of the Road to the Kentucky Derby as a result of the Derby being run in September instead of May.

Race	Distance	Purse	Grade	Track	Date	1st	2nd	3rd	4th	Ref
Matt Winn Stakes	1 1/16 miles	$150,000	3	Churchill Downs	May 23, 2020	Maxfield	Ny Traffic	Pneumatic	Attachment Rate	
Santa Anita Derby	1 1/8 miles	$400,000 (Note: Due to the COVID-19 pandemic in the United States the administration of Santa Anita Park lowered the purse of the Santa Anita Derby from $1 million to $400,000.)	1	Santa Anita	June 6, 2020 (Note: Santa Anita Derby was moved to the Extended Season due to rescheduling of the event.)	Honor A. P.	Authentic	Rushie	Anneau d'Or	
Belmont Stakes	1 1/8 miles	$1,000,000	1	Belmont Park	June 20, 2020	Tiz the Law	Dr Post	Max Player	Pneumatic	
Ohio Derby	1 1/8 miles	$500,000	3	Thistledown Racino	June 27, 2020	Dean Martini	South Bend	Storm the Court	Rowdy Yates	
Los Alamitos Derby	1 1/8 miles	$150,000	3	Los Alamitos	July 4, 2020	Uncle Chuck	Thousand Words	Cosmo	Great Power	
Indiana Derby	1 1/16 miles	$500,000	3	Indiana Grand	July 8, 2020	Shared Sense	Major Fed	Necker Island	Earner	
Blue Grass Stakes	1 1/8 miles	$600,000 (Note: Due to the COVID-19 pandemic in the United States the administration of Keeneland lowered the purse of the Blue Grass Stakes from $1 million to $600,000.)	2	Keeneland	July 11, 2020 (Note: Blue Grass Stakes was moved to the Extended Season due to rescheduling of the event.)	Art Collector	Swiss Skydiver	Rushie	Enforceable	
Peter Pan Stakes	1 1/8 miles	$100,000	3	Saratoga	July 16, 2020	Country Grammer	Caracaro	Mystic Guide	Celtic Striker	
Haskell Invitational	1 1/8 miles	$1,000,000	1	Monmouth Park	July 18, 2020	Authentic	NY Traffic	Dr Post	Jesus' Team	
Shared Belief Stakes	1 mile	$150,000		Del Mar	August 1, 2020	Thousand Words	Honor A.P.	Kiss Today Goodbye	Cezzane	
Travers Stakes	1 1/4 miles	$1,000,000	1	Saratoga	August 8, 2020	Tiz the Law	Caracaro	Max Player	South Bend	
Ellis Park Derby	1 mile	$100,000		Ellis Park	August 9, 2020	Art Collector	Attachment Rate	Necker Island	Rowdy Yates	
Pegasus Stakes	1 1/16 miles	$200,000	3	Monmouth Park Racetrack	August 15, 2020	Pneumatic	Jesus' Team	Arkaan	Super John	

Note:
Belmont Stakes: 1st=150 points; 2nd=60 points; 3rd=30 points; 4th=15 points
Blue Grass Stakes, Santa Anita Derby, Haskell Invitational, Travers Stakes: 1st=100 points; 2nd=40 points; 3rd=20 points; 4th=10 points
Matt Winn Stakes, Ellis Park Derby, Shared Belief Stakes, Peter Pan Stakes: 1st=50 points; 2nd=20 points; 3rd=10 points; 4th=5 points
Pegasus Stakes, Indiana Derby, Los Alamitos Derby, Ohio Derby: 1st=20 points; 2nd=8 points; 3rd=4 points; 4th=2 points

== Japan Road to the Kentucky Derby ==
The Japan Road to the Kentucky Derby is intended to provide a place in the Derby starting gate to the top finisher in the series. If the connections of that horse decline the invitation, their place is offered to the second-place finisher and so on through the top four finishers. If neither of the top four accept, this place in the starting gate reverts to the horses on the main road to the Derby.

The top point earners were Café Pharoah (70 points), Danon Pharaoh (40 points), Herrschaft (40 points) and Dieu du Vin (26 points). None of the invitations were accepted.

Races

Race	Distance	Track	Date	1st	2nd	3rd	4th	Ref
Cattleya Sho	1,600 metres (~1 mile)	Tokyo Racecourse	Nov 23 2019	Dieu du Vin	Shonan Mario	Daimei Corrida	Aurora Tesoro	
Zen-Nippon Nisai Yushun	1,600 metres (~1 mile)	Kawasaki Racecourse	Dec 18 2019	Vacation	Iolite	T's Dunk	Meisho Tensui	
Hyacinth Stakes	1,600 metres (~1 mile)	Tokyo Racecourse	Feb 23 2020	Cafe Pharoah	Tagano Beauty	Yaugau	Longonot	
Fukuryu Stakes	1,800 metres (~1 1/8 miles)	Nakayama Racecourse	Mar 28 2020	Herrschaft	T O Keynes	Miyaji Kokuo	American Face	
Unicorn Stakes	1,600 meters	Tokyo Racecourse	Jun 21 2020	Cafe Pharoah	Dieu du Vin	Kenshinko	Thunder Blitz	
Japan Dirt Derby	2,000 meters (~1 1/4 miles)	Oi Racecouse	Jul 8 2020	Danon Pharaoh	Daimei Corrida	Kitano Octopus	Bravoure	

Note: Cattleya Sho: 1st=10 points; 2nd=4 points; 3rd=2 points; 4th=1 point
Zen-Nippon Nisai Yushun: 1st=20 points; 2nd=8 points; 3rd=4 points; 4th=2 points
Hyacinth: 1st=30 points; 2nd=12 points; 3rd=6 points; 4th=3 points
Other 3 races : 1st=40 points; 2nd=16 points; 3rd=8 points; 4th=4 points

Qualification table

The top four horses (colored brown within the standings) are eligible to participate in the Kentucky Derby provided the horse is nominated.

Rank	Horse	Points	Eligible Earnings	Trainer	Owner	Ref
1	Cafe Pharoah	70		Noriyuki Hori	Koichi Nishikawa	
2	Danon Pharaoh	40		Yoshito Yahagi	Danox	
2	Herrschaft	40		Kenji Nonaka	Kanayama Holdings	
4	Dieu du Vin	26		Yukihiro Kato	Three H Racing	
5	Vacation	20		Kenichi Takatsuki	Masahiro Ogishi	
6	Daimei Corrida	18		Naoyuki Morita	Noboru Miyamoto	
7	T O Keynes	16		Daisuke Takayanagi	Tomoya Ozasa	
8	Tagano Beauty	12		Masato Nishizono	Koichi Nishikawa	
9	Iolite	8		Yoshinori Muto	Yuki Dento	
9	Kenshinko	8		Kazuo Konishi	Katsuhiko Amano	
9	Kitano Octopus	8		Noboru Takagi	Naoto Kitajo	
9	Miyaji Kokuo	8		Yoshihiko Kawamura	Tsukasa Soga	
13	Yaugau	6		Naosuke Sugai	G Riviere Racing	
14	American Face	4		Hirofumi Toda	Katsumi Yoshizawa	
14	Bravoure	4		Kenji Sato	Keiko Yamaguchi	
14	Shonan Mario	4		Yukihiro Kato	Shonan	
14	T's Dunk	4		Takashi Mizuno	Masahiro Ogishi	
14	Thunder Blitz	4		Takashi Kubota	Tsunefumi Kusama	
19	Longonot	3		Mizuki Takayanagi	Godolphin	
20	Meisho Tensui	2		Katsumi Minai	Yoshio Matsumoto	
21	Aurora Tesoro	1		Yoshihiro Hatakeyama	Ryotokuji Kenji Holdings	

Notes:

- brown highlight – qualified on points but declined offer
- grey highlight – did not qualify

== European Road to the Kentucky Derby ==
The European Road to the Kentucky Derby is designed on a similar basis to the Japan Road and is intended to provide a place in the Derby starting gate to the top finisher in the series. If the connections of that horse decline the invitation, their place is offered to the second-place finisher and so on. If none of the top four accept, this place in the starting gate reverts to the horses on the main road to the Derby.

The series was supposed to consist of seven races – four run on the turf in late 2019 when the horses were age two, plus three races run on a synthetic surface in early 2020. The last race in the series, the Cardinal Stakes, was postponed when horse racing in Britain was suspended from mid-March due to the coronavirus pandemic.

The top point earners were Nobel Prize (30 points), Crossfirehurricane (20 points), Chares (20 points) and Kameko (14 points). None of the invitations were accepted.

Races

Race	Distance	Track	Date	1st	2nd	3rd	4th	Ref
Royal Lodge Stakes	1 mile	Newmarket	Sep 28 2019	Royal Dornoch	Kameko	Iberia	Year Of The Tiger	
Beresford Stakes	1 mile	The Curragh	Sep 29 2019	Innisfree	Shekhem	Gold Maze	Camorra	
Prix Jean-Luc Lagardère	1,600 metres (about 1 mile)	Longchamp	Oct 6 2019	Victor Ludorum	Alson	Armory	Ecrivain	
Vertem Futurity Trophy	1 mile	Newcastle (Note: Originally the race was scheduled on 26 October 2019 at Doncaster Racecourse but the event was canceled due to the waterlogged condition of the track. Event was rescheduled for Friday, 1 November 2019.)	Nov 1 2019	Kameko	Innisfree	Year Of The Tiger	Mogul	
Patton Stakes	1 mile	Dundalk	Feb 28 2020	Crossfirehurricane	Choice Of Mine	Orchid Gardens	Dutch Admiral	
Road to the Kentucky Derby Conditions Stakes	1 mile	Kempton Park	Mar 4 2020	Chares	Berlin Tango	New World Tapestry	Naval Commander	
Cardinal Stakes	1 mile	Chelmsford City	Apr 2 2020	Cancelled				

Note:

- the four races in 2019 for two-year-olds: 1st=10 points; 2nd=4 points; 3rd=2 points; 4th=1 point
- the first two races in 2020: 1st=20 points; 2nd=8 points; 3rd=4 points; 4th=2 points
- The Cardinal Stakes: 1st=30 points; 2nd=12 points; 3rd=6 points; 4th=3 points

Qualification table

The top four horses (colored brown within the standings) are eligible to participate in the Kentucky Derby provided the horse is nominated.

Rank	Horse	Points	Eligible Earnings	Trainer	Owner	Ref
1	Chares	20				
1	Crossfirehurricane	20				
3	Innisfree	14				
3	Kameko	14				
5	Royal Dornoch	10				
5	Victor Ludorum	10				
7	Berlin Tango	8				
7	Choice of Mine	8				
9	Alson	4				
9	New World Tapestry	4				
9	Orchid Gardens	4				
9	Shekhem	4				
13	Year Of The Tiger	3				
14	Armory	2				
14	Dutch Admiral	2				
14	Gold Maze	2				
14	Iberia	2				
14	Naval Commander	2				
19	Camorra	1				
19	Ecrivain	1				
19	Mogul	1				

Notes:

- brown highlight – qualified on points but declined offer
- grey highlight – did not qualify

== See also ==
- 2020 Road to the Kentucky Oaks
