= Raceland =

Raceland may refer to:

== Communities ==
- Raceland, Kentucky, a city in Greenup County
- Raceland, Louisiana, an unincorporated community in Lafourche Parish

== Horse racing ==
- Raceland (estate), a former estate and horse racing track in the U.S. state of Massachusetts
- Raceland (horse) (1885–1894), an American Thoroughbred racehorse
- Raceland (race track), a horse racing track that operated in the 1920s in the U.S. state of Kentucky

== Other uses ==
- Raceland-Worthington Independent School District, a school district in the U.S. state of Kentucky
- SS Raceland, final name of a ship best known as the USS Howick Hall and sunk during World War II
- Wacky Raceland, a comic book series introduced in 2016
