= Pete D. Anderson =

American jockey and trainer

Personal information
- Born: November 20, 1931 Southampton, Long Island, New York, United States
- Died: February 19, 2013 (aged 81) Hialeah, Florida
- Occupation: Jockey / Trainer

Horse racing career
- Sport: Horse racing
- Career wins: 80 (as a trainer)

Major racing wins
- As a jockey: Louisiana Derby (1951); Breeders' Futurity (1954); Laurel Futurity (1956); Ashland Stakes (1957); Top Flight Handicap (1957); Vagrancy Handicap (1957); Acorn Stakes (1958); Hialeah Turf Cup Handicap (1959); Firenze Handicap (1959); Fall Highweight Handicap (1962); Ohio Derby (1964); Gotham Stakes (1966); Hawthorne Gold Cup (1966); Monmouth Handicap (1966); Washington Park Handicap (1966); Governor Stakes (1969); Lexington Handicap (1969); Saratoga Special Stakes (1969); Coaching Club American Oaks (1970); Gazelle Handicap (1970); National Stallion Stakes (1970); Aqueduct Handicap (1973); Kentucky Jockey Club Stakes (1973) American Classic Race wins: Belmont Stakes (1958) As a trainer: Oceanport Handicap (1978); Ohio Derby (2007)

Significant horses
- Bold Bidder, Traffic Judge, Sword Dancer, Cavan, Cannonade, Missile Belle, Forego, Verbatim

Peter D. Anderson (November 20, 1931, in Southampton, Long Island, New York – February 19, 2013, in Hialeah, Florida) was an American jockey and Thoroughbred racehorse trainer. He began his riding career in the latter part of the late 1940s and was the leading apprentice jockey in New York in 1948. Like many of his compatriots, Anderson struggled throughout his career to maintain his weight.

Anderson won a number of major Graded stakes races including a victory in the 1966 Washington Park Handicap aboard Bold Bidder in which he defeated the future Hall of Fame inductee, Tom Rolfe. In the 1973 Kentucky Derby, he rode the great Forego to a fourth-place finish behind eventual Triple Crown champion, Secretariat. In all, he rode Forego in ten starts, earning three wins and a second in the Florida Derby. In his only appearance in the Preakness Stakes, Anderson rode Primate to a fourth-place finish in the 1952 race. However, Anderson's most important career win came in 1958 when he rode Cavan to an upset win over Tim Tam that denied the Calumet Farm colt the Triple Crown.

Following his retirement from riding in the mid-1970s, Anderson remained in the racing business as a trainer. Based at Calder Race Course in Miami Gardens, Florida, in 2007 he was notably the trainer of Delightful Kiss for Hobeau Farm. In June, the gelding won the Ohio Derby, a race that in 1964 Anderson also won as a jockey aboard National.

Anderson's daughter, Aggie Ordonez, is also a stakes winning Thoroughbred trainer and is based at Santa Anita Park in Arcadia, California.
