= Deputy Glitters =

American-bred Thoroughbred racehorse

- Deputy Glitters at the 2006 Ohio Derby
- Sire: Deputy Commander
- Grandsire: Deputy Minister
- Dam: Glitters
- Damsire: Glitterman
- Sex: Stallion
- Foaled: 2003
- Country: United States
- Colour: Bay
- Breeder: Joseph LaCombe Stable Inc.
- Owner: Joseph LaCombe Stable Inc.
- Trainer: Tom Albertrani
- Record: 13: 3-1-0
- Earnings: $425,548

Major wins
- Ohio Derby (2006); Tampa Bay Derby (2006)
- Last updated on June 12, 2007

Deputy Glitters (foaled April 27, 2003 in Kentucky) is an American Thoroughbred racehorse who was a contender for the U.S. Triple Crown in 2006.

== Connections ==
Deputy Glitters is owned and bred by Joseph LaCombe Stable Inc. and trained by Thomas Albertrani. He has been ridden by René R. Douglas and Jose Lezcano.

== Races ==
| Finish | Race | Distance | Track | Condition |
| 1st | Ohio Derby | One and One-Eighth Miles | Thistledown | Fast |
| 8th | Kentucky Derby | One and One-Quarter Miles | Churchill Downs | Fast |
| 6th | Wood Memorial Stakes | One and One-Eighth Miles | Aqueduct Racetrack | Sloppy |
| 1st | Tampa Bay Derby | One and One-Sixteenth Miles | Tampa Bay Downs | Fast |
| 2nd | Sam F. Davis Stakes | One and One-Sixteenth Miles | Tampa Bay Downs | Fast |
| 5th | Allowance | One Mile | Gulfstream Park | Fast |
| 4th | Huntington Stakes | Six Furlongs | Aqueduct Racetrack | Fast |
| 6th | Champagne Stakes | One Mile | Belmont Park | Sloppy |
| 1st | Maiden Claiming | Six Furlongs | Saratoga Race Course | Fast |
