= Storm the Court =

American thoroughbred racehorse

- Sire: Court Vision
- Grandsire: Gulch
- Dam: My Tejana Storm
- Damsire: Tejano Run
- Sex: Stallion
- Foaled: 2017
- Country: United States
- Color: Bay
- Breeder: Stepping Stone Farm
- Owner: Exline-Border Racing LLC
- Trainer: Peter Eurton
- Record: 25 : 2 - 4 - 4
- Earnings: $1,407,453

Major wins
- Breeders' Cup Juvenile (2019)
- Last updated on May 17, 2024

Storm the Court (foaled May 5, 2017) is an American Thoroughbred racehorse and the winner of the 2019 Breeders' Cup Juvenile.

== Career ==
Storm the Court's first race was on August 10, 2019, at Del Mar Racetrack, where he came in first.

On September 2, 2019, he competed in the Grade 1 2019 Del Mar Futurity, but did not finish after a collision with another horse, Eight Rings.

In his third race on September 27, 2019, he competed in the Grade 1 2019 American Pharoah Stakes. He finished in third place in the race, which was coincidentally won by Eight Rings.

On November 1, 2019, at 45:1 odds, he won the 2019 Breeders' Cup Juvenile, this time defeating Eight Rings. Due to this win, he earned consideration in the 2020 Road to the Kentucky Derby.

On the 2020 Road to the Kentucky Derby, as well as winning the Juvenile, Storm the Court came third in the 2020 San Felipe Stakes, and third in the 2020 Ohio Derby. In the 2020 Kentucky Derby, run in September rather than in May, Storm the Court went off at 27–1 and finished sixth in a field of 15.

== Pedigree ==
Pedigree of Storm the Court (USA), 2017
Sire Court Vision (USA) 2005	Gulch (USA); 1984	Mr. Prospector	Raise a Native
Sire Court Vision (USA) 2005	Gulch (USA); 1984	Mr. Prospector	Gold Digger
Sire Court Vision (USA) 2005	Gulch (USA); 1984	Jameela	Ramunctious
Sire Court Vision (USA) 2005	Gulch (USA); 1984	Jameela	Asbury Mary
Sire Court Vision (USA) 2005	Weekend Storm (USA); 1992	Storm Bird	Northern Dancer
Sire Court Vision (USA) 2005	Weekend Storm (USA); 1992	Storm Bird	South Ocean
Sire Court Vision (USA) 2005	Weekend Storm (USA); 1992	Weekend Surprise	Secretariat
Sire Court Vision (USA) 2005	Weekend Storm (USA); 1992	Weekend Surprise	Lassie Dear
Dam My Tejana Storm (USA) 2003	Tejano Run (USA); 1992	Tejano	Caro
Dam My Tejana Storm (USA) 2003	Tejano Run (USA); 1992	Tejano	Infantes
Dam My Tejana Storm (USA) 2003	Tejano Run (USA); 1992	Royal Run	Wavering Monarch
Dam My Tejana Storm (USA) 2003	Tejano Run (USA); 1992	Royal Run	Kazadancoa
Dam My Tejana Storm (USA) 2003	Sarah's Settlement (USA); 1989	Settlement Day	Buckpasser
Dam My Tejana Storm (USA) 2003	Sarah's Settlement (USA); 1989	Settlement Day	Lovely Morning
Dam My Tejana Storm (USA) 2003	Sarah's Settlement (USA); 1989	Sarahs Hope	Riva Ridge
Dam My Tejana Storm (USA) 2003	Sarah's Settlement (USA); 1989	Sarahs Hope	Grey Ballet
