= Thomas Albertrani =

American Thoroughbred racehorse trainer

Tom Albertrani
Personal information
- Born: March 21, 1958 (age 68) Brooklyn, New York, United States
- Occupation: Trainer

Horse racing career
- Sport: Horse racing
- Career wins: 457+ (ongoing)

Major racing wins
- Frizette Stakes (2004); Lexington Stakes (2005); Peter Pan Stakes (2005); Sheepshead Bay Handicap (2005); Jim Dandy Stakes (2006); Jockey Club Gold Cup (2006); Ohio Derby (2006); Point Given Stakes (2006); Tampa Bay Derby (2006); Travers Stakes (2006); Withers Stakes (2006); Woody Stephens Stakes (2006); Canadian Turf Handicap (2008); Sands Point Stakes (2008, 2009); Aqueduct Handicap (2009); Comely Stakes (2014) American Classic Race wins: Preakness Stakes (2006)

Racing awards
- Red Smith "Good Guy" Award (2006)

Significant horses
- Deputy Glitters, Bernardini

Thomas "Tom" Albertrani (born March 21, 1958, in Brooklyn, New York) is an American Thoroughbred racehorse trainer. He began his career as a jockey then spent a number of years as an assistant to trainer Bill Mott. In 1995 Albertrani was hired as an assistant to head trainer Saeed bin Suroor at the prominent international Godolphin Racing stable based in Dubai in the United Arab Emirates. After working for Godolphin and the Maktoum family's related Darley Racing operations in Dubai, Australia, Japan and at various race tracks throughout Europe, in 2005 Albertrani returned to the New York City area and in addition to conditioning horses for Darley, he opened a public stable to take on horses from various owners.

In 2006, Albertrani won the Tampa Bay and Ohio Derbys with Joseph LaCombe's Deputy Glitters and with Darley Racing's colt, Bernardini, he won five consecutive stakes races including the Preakness and Travers Stakes and the Jockey Club Gold Cup. That year he was voted a share of the Red Smith "Good Guy" Award with fellow trainer, Kiaran McLaughlin.

His brother, Louis Albertrani (1957–2024), was also a Thoroughbred trainer.
