= DWU =

DWU may refer to

- Ashland Regional Airport (FAA identifier: DWU)
- Dakota Wesleyan University
- Dallas Water Utilities
- Divine Word University
- Divine Word University of Tacloban
- Dominion Wrestling Union
- Dongduk Women's University
