= Pan Zareta Stakes =

- Class: Non-graded stakes
- Location: Fair Grounds Race Course; New Orleans, Louisiana
- Inaugurated: 1966
- Race type: Thoroughbred - Flat racing
- Website: fairgroundsracecourse.com

Race information
- Distance: 5.5 furlongs
- Surface: Turf
- Track: left-handed
- Qualification: Fillies & Mares, four years old & up
- Purse: $100,000

The Pan Zareta Stakes is an American Thoroughbred horse race run at the Fair Grounds Race Course in New Orleans, Louisiana, each winter. An ungraded stakes, the Pan Zareta is a 5.5 furlong sprint on turf open to fillies and mares four years old and up. The race currently offers a $100,000 purse.

First run in 1966, the race is named in honor of the Hall of Fame racing mare, Pan Zareta who is buried in the infield of the Fair Grounds alongside two other horses, Black Gold and Tudor Tambourine. All three of these horses died at the track, Black Gold and Tudor Tambourine while racing, and Pan Zareta in her stall on Christmas Day. Each year, the winning jockey lays a wreath on Pan Zareta's grave after the race.

== Past winners ==
Winners since the beginning of the new century are:

- 2023 - Carimba (Marcelino Pedroza Jr.)
- 2022 - Oeuvre (Jareth Loveberry)
- 2021 - Brooke Marie (Adam Beschizza)
- 2020 - Elle Z (Mitchell Murrill)
- 2019 - Play On (Shaun Bridgmohan)
- 2018 - Contributing (Joe Bravo)
- 2017 - Triple Chelsea (Adam Beschizza)
- 2016 - Kathballu (Florent Geroux)
- 2015 - Thirteen Arrows (Mitchell Murrill)
- 2015 - Good Deed (Brian Joseph Hernandez, Jr.)
- 2014 - Seeking Ms Shelley (Roman Chapa)
- 2013 - My My My Maria (Brian Joseph Hernandez, Jr)
- 2012 - Inspired (John Velazquez)
- 2011 - Beautician (Julien Leparoux)
- 2010 - Double Espresso (James Graham)
- 2009 - Precious Kiss (John Jacinto)
- 2008 - Graeme Six (Julien Leparoux)
- 2007 - Mykindasaint (Gerard Melancon)
- 2006 - (Cancelled due to Hurricane Katrina)
- 2005 - Souris (Brian Joseph Hernandez, Jr.)
- 2004 - Handpainted (Larry Melancon)
- 2003 - Fuse It (Gerard Melancon)
- 2002 - My Brent's Diamond (Frank Lovato, Jr.)
- 2001 - Hallowed Dreams (Sylvester Carmouche, Jr.)
- 2000 - Steal a Heart (Robby Albarado)

== Going Back ==
- 1999 - Zuppardo Ardo
- 1998 - Sky Blue Pink
- 1997 - J J'sDream
- 1994 - Bayou Bidder
- 1993 - Bayou Bidder
- 1992 - Parisian Flight
- 1991 - Firebrat
- 1990 - Cathy Quick
- 1989 - Avie Jane
- 1983 - Monique Rene (5)
- 1982 - Monique Rene (4)
- 1978 - Famed Princess
- 1977 - Regal Rumor
- 1974 - Color Me Blue
- 1973 - Color Me Blue
- 1970 - Round Pearl
- 1969 - Copper Canyon
- 1968 - Likely Swap
- 1967 - Victoria Lass
- 1966 - Boston Babble
