= Limehouse (horse) =

American-bred Thoroughbred racehorse

- Sire: Grand Slam
- Grandsire: Gone West
- Dam: Dixieland Blues
- Damsire: Dixieland Band
- Sex: Stallion
- Foaled: 2001
- Country: United States
- Colour: Chestnut
- Breeder: Cheryl A. Curtin
- Owner: Dogwood Stable
- Trainer: Todd Pletcher
- Record: 21: 7-2-3
- Earnings: $1,110,433

Major wins
- Bashford Manor Stakes (2003); Hutcheson Stakes (2004); Tampa Bay Derby (2004); Alysheba Stakes (2005); Brooklyn Handicap (2005)
- Last updated on September 21, 2007

Limehouse (foaled February 26, 2001 in Florida) is an American Thoroughbred racehorse. Campaigned by W. Cothran Campbell's Dogwood Stable and trained by leading trainer Todd Pletcher, the chestnut son of popular sire Grand Slam was purchased at the Fasig-Tipton sale (August 2002) as a yearling for $140,000.

== Racehorse ==
During his racing career, Limehouse won 7 of 21 starts, including the 2003 Bashford Manor Stakes (Grade 3), the 2004 Hutcheson Stakes (Grade 2), the 2004 Tampa Bay Derby (Grade 3), and the 2005 Brooklyn Handicap (Grade 2). He also ran 3rd in the 2004 Blue Grass Stakes (Grade 1) and was 4th behind Smarty Jones in the 2004 Kentucky Derby at 42/1 odds.

== Race Record ==
Finish	Race	Distance	Track	Beyer
2005
6th	Breeders' Cup Mile	One Mile (Turf)	Belmont Park	105
5th	Kelso Breeders' Cup Handicap	One Mile (Turf)	Belmont Park	106
5th	Whitney Handicap	One and One-Eighth Miles	Saratoga	91
5th	Hollywood Gold Cup	One and One-Fourth Miles	Hollywood Park	96
1st	Brooklyn Handicap	One and One-Eighth Miles	Belmont Park	112
1st	Alysheba Stakes	One and One-Sixteenth Miles	Churchill Downs	102
5th	Oaklawn Handicap	One and One-Eighth Miles	Oaklawn Park	96
2nd	New Orleans Handicap	One and One-Eighth Miles	Fair Grounds	108
4th	Sunshine Millions Classic	One and One-Eighth Miles	Gulfstream Park	103
2nd	Mr. Prospector Handicap	Six Furlongs	Gulfstream Park	100
2004
6th	Ohio Derby	One and One-Eighth Miles	Thistledown	75
4th	Kentucky Derby	One and One-Fourth Miles	Churchill Downs	95
3rd	Blue Grass Stakes	One and One-Eighth Miles	Keeneland Race Course	100
1st	Tampa Bay Derby	One and One-Sixteenth Miles	Tampa Bay Downs	100
1st	Hutcheson Stakes	Seven Furlongs	Gulfstream Park	99
2003
3rd	Breeders' Futurity Stakes	One and One-Sixteenth Miles	Keeneland Race Course	90
5th	Hopeful Stakes	Seven Furlongs	Saratoga	74
3rd	Saratoga Special Stakes	Six and One-Half Furlongs	Saratoga	79
1st	Bashford Manor Stakes	Six Furlongs	Churchill Downs	86
1st	Three Chimneys Juvenile Stakes	Five Furlongs	Churchill Downs	92
1st	Maiden Special Weight	Four and One-Half Furlongs	Keeneland Race Course	N/A

== Stallion ==
Limehouse was retired sound after running 6th in the Breeders' Cup Mile in 2005 and began his stud duties at Vinery in Lexington, Kentucky, for a fee of $17,500 for a single live cover breeding. His first crop began racing in 2009. He is currently standing at O'Sullivan Farms in Charles Town, WV for a fee of $2,500 for a live foal breeding.
