= Paul A. Mooney =

- Born: April 7, 1941; Miami, Florida, United States
- Died: April 23, 2000 (aged 59); Duxbury, Massachusetts, United States
- Occupation: Sports executive
- Parent: J. D. Mooney

Paul A. Mooney (April 7, 1941 – April 23, 2000) was an American sports executive who served as president of the Boston Bruins and Boston Garden from October 1, 1975, to March 24, 1987.

== Early life and career ==
Mooney was born in Miami, and his father was J. D. Mooney, a jockey who rode 1924 Kentucky Derby winner Black Gold. His brother, John J. Mooney, was a horse racing executive and a member of the Canadian Horse Racing Hall of Fame.

Mooney graduated from Harvard College and did graduate studies at Harvard Business School.

Prior to joining the Bruins, Mooney worked in the horse racing industry. He served as executive vice-president and treasurer and later president of the Louisville Racing Corporation, executive vice president of the Kentucky Jockey Club, and executive vice president of Latonia Race Course. He also was a vice president of Sportsystems.

== Boston Bruins ==
Mooney was named president of the Boston Bruins and Boston Garden on October 1, 1975, after the team and arena were purchased by Jeremy Jacobs' company, Sportsystems.

During his tenure as president, he twice reached agreements with the Boston Celtics to remain at the Garden, led the effort against the NHL–WHA merger, worked on the Bruins' failed move to Salem, New Hampshire, fired longtime Garden organist John Kiley, and along with other members of Bruins management helped take care of Bruins' player Normand Leveille after he suffered a cerebral hemorrhage and fell into a coma.

On May 30, 1986, William D. Hassett, Jr. was named chairman and chief executive officer of the Boston Bruins and the Boston Garden. Although Mooney retained his positions, he now answered to Hassett. On March 24, 1987, Mooney was fired and replaced by Hassett as Bruins president and Lawrence Moulter as Garden president.

While working for the Bruins and the Garden, Mooney also owned part of the Campbell Sports Network, a Plymouth, Massachusetts-based radio network than owned the rights to Boston Red Sox games from 1983 to 1989.

Mooney was also a member Boston Athletic Association board of directors. He was credited by sportswriter Will McDonough with helping bring the Boston Marathon back to prominence.

== Death ==
Mooney died on April 23, 2000, at the age of 59 at his home in Duxbury, Massachusetts, due to cancer.

Preceded by Weston Adams, Jr.	President of the Boston Bruins; 1975–87	Succeeded by William D. Hassett, Jr.
Preceded by Weston Adams, Jr.	President of the Boston Garden; 1975–87	Succeeded by Lawrence Moulter
