= 1924 Kentucky Derby =

Horse race

50th Kentucky Derby
- Kentucky Derby
- Location: Churchill Downs
- Date: May 17, 1924
- Winning horse: Black Gold
- Jockey: J. D. Mooney
- Trainer: Hanley Webb
- Owner: Rosa M. Hoots
- Conditions: Fast
- Surface: Dirt

The 1924 Kentucky Derby was the 50th running of the Kentucky Derby. The race was run on May 17, 1924. The victory for Rosa Hoot's Black Gold marked the second time a woman owned the Derby winner and the second time a woman had been the winning breeder. However, it was the first time in history that a woman both owned and bred the winner. Bracadale actually finished 3rd, obscured on the rail after the close finish. Beau Butler was not close.

== Payout ==
The Kentucky Derby Payout Schedule

Program Number	Horse Name	Win	Place	Show
1	Black Gold	$5.50	$5.40	$4.40
13	Chilhowee	–	$12.30	$7.30
10	Beau Butler	–	–	$4.70

The Actual Top 4, in a close finish, were 1st Black Gold, 2nd Chilhowee, 3rd Bracadale, 4th Altawood.

== Field ==
Position	Post	Horse	Jockey	Trainer	Owner	Final Odds	Stake
1	1	Black Gold	J. D. Mooney	Hanley Webb	Rosa M. Hoots	1.75	$52,775
2	13	Chilhowee	Albert Johnson	John C. Gallaher	Gallaher Brothers	15.25	$6,000
3	10	Beau Butler	Lawrence Lyke	Herbert J. Thompson	Edward R. Bradley	10.25	$3,000
4	7	Altawood	Lawrence McDermott	G. Hamilton Keene	C. Bruce Headley	19.10	$1,000
5	12	Bracadale	Earl Sande	Sam Hildreth	Rancocas Stable	3.40	
6	2	Transmute	Linus McAtee	James G. Rowe Sr.	Harry Payne Whitney	10.25	
7	5	Revenue Agent	Dave Hurn	Carroll H. Shilling	Gifford A. Cochran	26.75	
8	6	Thorndale	Benny Marinelli	Fred Burlew	Benjamin Block	10.70	
9	3	Klondyke	Ivan H. Parke	James G. Rowe Sr.	Harry Payne Whitney	10.25	
10	9	Mad Play	Laverne Fator	Sam Hildreth	Rancocas Stable	3.40	
11	4	King Gorin II	Mack Garner	Pete Coyne	Pete Coyne	36.60	
12	8	Cannon Shot	George Ellis	Early F. Wright	C. A. Hartwell	10.70	
13	16	Modest	James Wallace	John F. Schorr	Edward B. McLean	10.70	
14	15	Diogenes	Clyde Ponce	Robert A. Smith	Sarah F. Jeffords	10.70	
15	19	Nautical	Chick Lang	William M. Garth	Joshua S. Cosden	10.70	
16	17	Mr. Mutt	John Merimee	Albert B. "Alex" Gordon	Bud Fisher	35.00	
17	18	Baffling	George W. Carroll	Herbert J. Thompson	Edward R. Bradley	10.25	
18	11	Wild Aster	Frank Coltiletti	Scott P. Harlan	Greentree Stable	10.70	
19	14	Bob Tail	Eric Blind	Herbert J. Thompson	Edward R. Bradley	10.25	

- Winning Breeder: Rosa M. Hoots (KY)
- Margins – 1/2 length
- Time – 2:05 1/5
- Track – Fast
