= Eight Rings =

American thoroughbred racehorse

- Sire: Empire Maker
- Grandsire: Unbridled
- Dam: Purely Hot
- Damsire: Pure Prize
- Sex: Stallion
- Foaled: 2017
- Country: USA
- Color: Dark Bay/Brown
- Breeder: WinStar Farm, LLC
- Owner: SF Racing LLC
- Trainer: Bob Baffert
- Record: 4:2-0-0
- Earnings: $236,951

Major wins
- American Pharoah Stakes (2019)
- Last updated on January 9th, 2020

Eight Rings (foaled March 24, 2017, in Kentucky) is an American Thoroughbred racehorse and the winner of the 2019 American Pharoah Stakes.

== Career ==
Eight Rings' first race was on August 4, 2019, at Del Mar, where he came in first.

On September 2, 2019, he competed in the Grade 1 2019 Del Mar Futurity, but did not finish after a collision with another horse, Storm the Court.

In his third race on September 27, 2019, he competed in the Grade 1 2019 American Pharoah Stakes. He won the race, defeating Storm the Court, who he collided with at the 2019 Del Mar Futurity. The win earned him a spot in the 2019 Breeders' Cup Juvenile and earned him consideration in the 2020 Road to the Kentucky Derby.

On November 1, 2019, Eight Rings competed in the 2019 Breeders' Cup Juvenile, finishing in 6th place behind his rival Storm the Court who won the race. On that result, trainer Bob Baffert said, "He didn't show up that day. I'm still upset at myself for not having him ready that day."

Eight Rings next start was in the 2020 Bachelor Stakes at Oaklawn Park, where he came fifth.

== Pedigree ==
Pedigree of Eight Rings (USA), 2017
Sire Empire Maker (USA) 2000	Unbridled (USA); 1987	Fappiano	Mr. Prospector
Sire Empire Maker (USA) 2000	Unbridled (USA); 1987	Fappiano	Killaloe
Sire Empire Maker (USA) 2000	Unbridled (USA); 1987	Gana Facil	Le Fabuleux
Sire Empire Maker (USA) 2000	Unbridled (USA); 1987	Gana Facil	Charedi
Sire Empire Maker (USA) 2000	Toussaud (USA); 1989	El Gran Senor	Northern Dancer
Sire Empire Maker (USA) 2000	Toussaud (USA); 1989	El Gran Senor	Sex Appeal
Sire Empire Maker (USA) 2000	Toussaud (USA); 1989	Image of Reality	In Reality
Sire Empire Maker (USA) 2000	Toussaud (USA); 1989	Image of Reality	Edee's Image
Dam Purely Hot (USA) 2008	Pure Prize (USA); 1998	Storm Cat	Storm Bird
Dam Purely Hot (USA) 2008	Pure Prize (USA); 1998	Storm Cat	Terlingua
Dam Purely Hot (USA) 2008	Pure Prize (USA); 1998	Heavenly Prize	Seeking The Gold
Dam Purely Hot (USA) 2008	Pure Prize (USA); 1998	Heavenly Prize	Oh What A Dance
Dam Purely Hot (USA) 2008	Wood Not (USA); 2001	Kissin Kris	Kris S
Dam Purely Hot (USA) 2008	Wood Not (USA); 2001	Kissin Kris	Toes Forward
Dam Purely Hot (USA) 2008	Wood Not (USA); 2001	Wood So	Baederwood
Dam Purely Hot (USA) 2008	Wood Not (USA); 2001	Wood So	Impudence
