= John W. Collier =

John Walton Collier
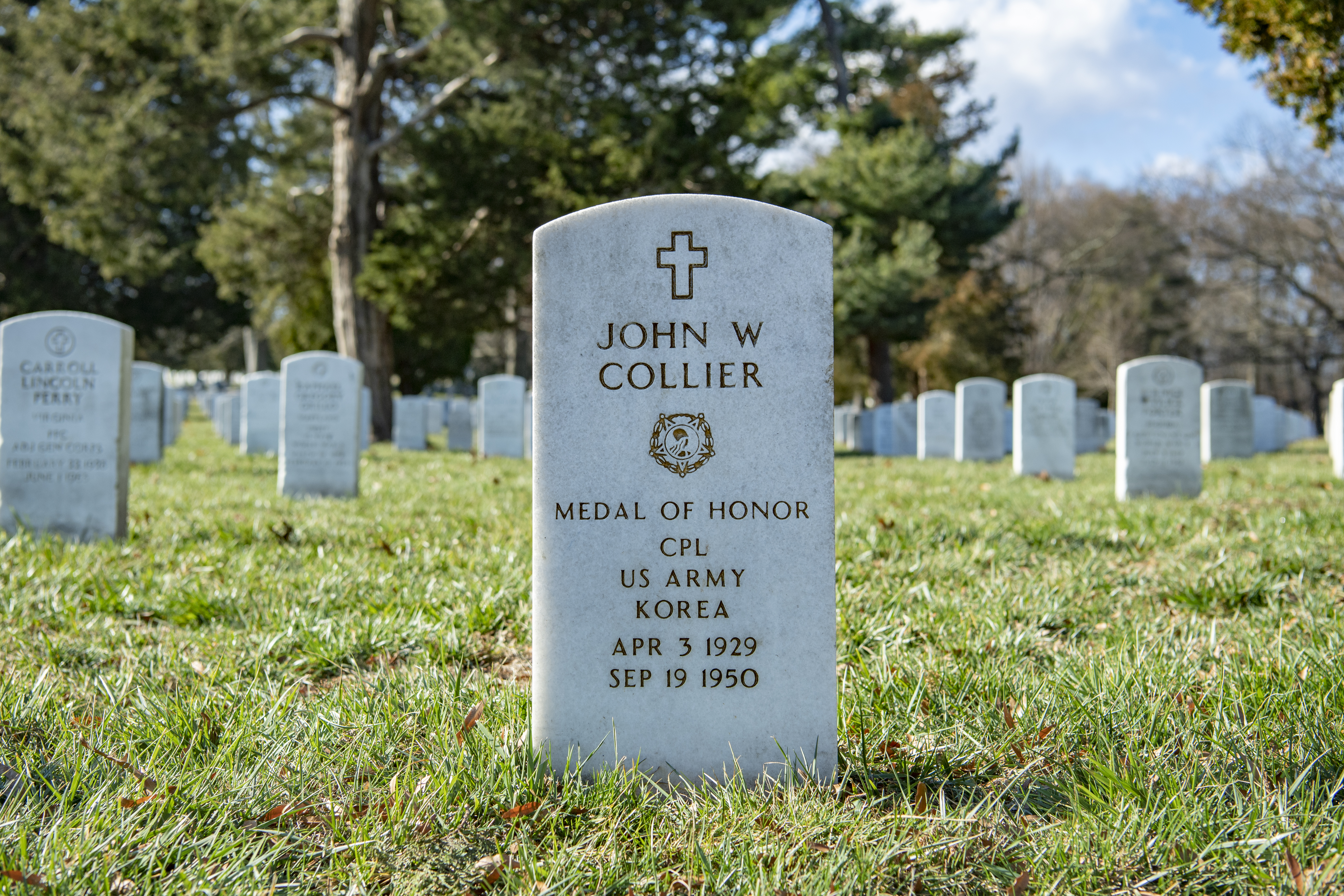
- Grave at Arlington National Cemetery
- Born: April 3, 1929; Worthington, Kentucky
- Died: September 19, 1950 (aged 21); Pusan Perimeter, Korea
- Burial place: Arlington National Cemetery, Arlington, Virginia
- Military career
- Allegiance: United States of America
- Branch: United States Army
- Service years: -1950
- Rank: Corporal
- Units: Company C, 27th Infantry Regiment, 25th Infantry Division
- Conflicts: Korean War: Battle of Pusan Perimeter; Pusan Perimeter Offensive †
- Awards: Medal of Honor; Purple Heart

John Walton Collier (April 3, 1929 – September 19, 1950) was a soldier in the United States Army during the Korean War. On June 24, 1951, he posthumously received the Medal of Honor for his actions during the breakout from the Pusan Perimeter.

== Medal of Honor citation ==
Rank and organization: Corporal, U.S. Army, Company C, 27th Infantry Regiment, 25th Infantry Division

Place and date: Near Chindong-ni, Korea, September 19, 1950,

Entered service at: Worthington, Ky. Born: April 3, 1929, Worthington, Ky

G.O. No.: 86, August 2, 1951.

Citation

Cpl. Collier, Company C, distinguished himself by conspicuous gallantry and intrepidity above and beyond the call of duty in action. While engaged in an assault on a strategic ridge strongly defended by a fanatical enemy, the leading elements of his company encountered intense automatic weapons and grenade fire. Cpl. Collier and 3 comrades volunteered and moved forward to neutralize an enemy machine gun position which was hampering the company's advance, but they were twice repulsed. On the third attempt, Cpl. Collier, despite heavy enemy fire and grenade barrages, moved to an exposed position ahead of his comrades, assaulted and destroyed the machine gun nest, killing at least 4 enemy soldiers. As he returned down the rocky, fire-swept hill and joined his squad, an enemy grenade landed in their midst. Shouting a warning to his comrades, he, selflessly and unhesitatingly, threw himself upon the grenade and smothered its explosion with his body. This intrepid action saved his comrades from death or injury. Cpl. Collier's supreme, personal bravery, consummate gallantry, and noble self-sacrifice reflect untold glory upon himself and uphold the honored traditions of the military service.

== Awards and decorations ==

Badge	Combat Infantryman Badge		
1st row	Medal of Honor		
2nd row	Purple Heart	Army Good Conduct Medal	National Defense Service Medal
3rd row	Korean Service Medal with 2 Campaign stars	United Nations Service Medal Korea	Korean War Service Medal Retroactively Awarded, 2003
Unit awards	Presidential Unit Citation		Korean Presidential Unit Citation

== See also ==
- List of Medal of Honor recipients
- List of Korean War Medal of Honor recipients
