= Worthington, Kentucky =

- City
- Location of Worthington in Greenup County, Kentucky.
- Coordinates: 38°33′2″N 82°44′5″W
- Country: United States
- State: Kentucky
- County: Greenup
- Incorporated: February 5, 1920
- Named for: William Jackson Worthington, a local landowner

Government
  - Mayor: W. Jason Flocker

Area
  - Total: 1.25 sq mi (3.23 km^{2})
  - Land: 1.14 sq mi (2.94 km^{2})
  - Water: 0.11 sq mi (0.29 km^{2})
- Elevation: 561 ft (171 m)

Population (2020)
  - Total: 1,501
  - Density: 1,321.3/sq mi (510.17/km^{2})
- Time zone: UTC-5 (Eastern (EST))
  - Summer (DST): UTC-4 (EDT)
- ZIP code: 41183
- Area code: 606
- FIPS code: 21-84864
- GNIS feature ID: 0507152
- Website: https://www.worthingtonky.org/

Worthington is a home rule-class city on the south bank of the Ohio River in Greenup County, Kentucky, in the United States. As of the 2020 census, Worthington had a population of 1,501.

Worthington is a part of the Huntington-Ashland-Ironton metropolitan area.

== History ==
The site of the present city was once owned by Abraham Buford, who sold the land to the Means and Russell Iron Company. This company sold the land to W. J. Worthington, who was William O. Bradley's lieutenant governor from 1895 to 1899. After his death, the property was given to his daughters, who founded the present town and named it for their father.

Worthington was incorporated as a city by the Kentucky General Assembly on February 5, 1920.

== Geography ==
Worthington is located in eastern Greenup County at 38°33′2″N 82°44′5″W (38.550616, -82.734694), on the south bank of the Ohio River. It is bordered to the west by Wurtland, to the south by Raceland, and to the east by Russell. Directly across the river is the village of Hanging Rock, Ohio, but the closest river crossing is the Oakley C. Collins Memorial Bridge 3 miles (5 km) to the southeast, connecting Russell with Ironton, Ohio.

According to the United States Census Bureau, the city of Worthington has a total area of 1.2 square miles (3.1 km^{2}), of which 1.1 square miles (2.9 km^{2}) is land and 0.1 square miles (0.2 km^{2}), or 7.03%, is water.

== Demographics ==
Historical population
| Census | Pop. | Note | %± |
|---|---|---|---|
| 1930 | 843 | | — |
| 1940 | 918 | | 8.9% |
| 1950 | 695 | | −24.3% |
| 1960 | 1,235 | | 77.7% |
| 1970 | 1,364 | | 10.4% |
| 1980 | 1,948 | | 42.8% |
| 1990 | 1,751 | | −10.1% |
| 2000 | 1,673 | | −4.5% |
| 2010 | 1,609 | | −3.8% |
| 2020 | 1,501 | | −6.7% |
U.S. Decennial Census

=== 2020 census ===
As of the 2020 census, Worthington had a population of 1,501. The median age was 43.4 years. 21.8% of residents were under the age of 18 and 20.7% of residents were 65 years of age or older. For every 100 females there were 91.7 males, and for every 100 females age 18 and over there were 87.2 males age 18 and over.

100.0% of residents lived in urban areas, while 0.0% lived in rural areas.

There were 615 households in Worthington, of which 31.4% had children under the age of 18 living in them. Of all households, 50.1% were married-couple households, 16.4% were households with a male householder and no spouse or partner present, and 28.0% were households with a female householder and no spouse or partner present. About 25.3% of all households were made up of individuals and 11.5% had someone living alone who was 65 years of age or older.

There were 678 housing units, of which 9.3% were vacant. The homeowner vacancy rate was 1.9% and the rental vacancy rate was 6.1%.

Racial composition as of the 2020 census
| Race | Number | Percent |
|---|---|---|
| White | 1,445 | 96.3% |
| Black or African American | 8 | 0.5% |
| American Indian and Alaska Native | 0 | 0.0% |
| Asian | 7 | 0.5% |
| Native Hawaiian and Other Pacific Islander | 0 | 0.0% |
| Some other race | 2 | 0.1% |
| Two or more races | 39 | 2.6% |
| Hispanic or Latino (of any race) | 10 | 0.7% |

=== 2000 census ===
As of the census of 2000, there were 1,673 people, 663 households, and 519 families residing in the city. The population density was 1,427.1 inhabitants per square mile (551.0/km^{2}). There were 698 housing units at an average density of 595.4 per square mile (229.9/km^{2}). The racial makeup of the city was 98.74% White, 0.06% African American, 0.06% Asian, 0.36% from other races, and 0.78% from two or more races. Hispanic or Latino of any race were 0.78% of the population.

There were 663 households, out of which 31.5% had children under the age of 18 living with them, 62.9% were married couples living together, 12.1% had a female householder with no husband present, and 21.6% were non-families. 19.6% of all households were made up of individuals, and 10.9% had someone living alone who was 65 years of age or older. The average household size was 2.52 and the average family size was 2.86.

In the city, the population was spread out, with 23.3% under the age of 18, 7.7% from 18 to 24, 26.7% from 25 to 44, 27.4% from 45 to 64, and 15.0% who were 65 years of age or older. The median age was 41 years. For every 100 females, there were 91.0 males. For every 100 females age 18 and over, there were 85.1 males.

The median income for a household in the city was $34,875, and the median income for a family was $39,737. Males had a median income of $35,324 versus $19,643 for females. The per capita income for the city was $19,239. About 7.8% of families and 9.3% of the population were below the poverty line, including 12.8% of those under age 18 and 6.2% of those age 65 or over.

== Education ==
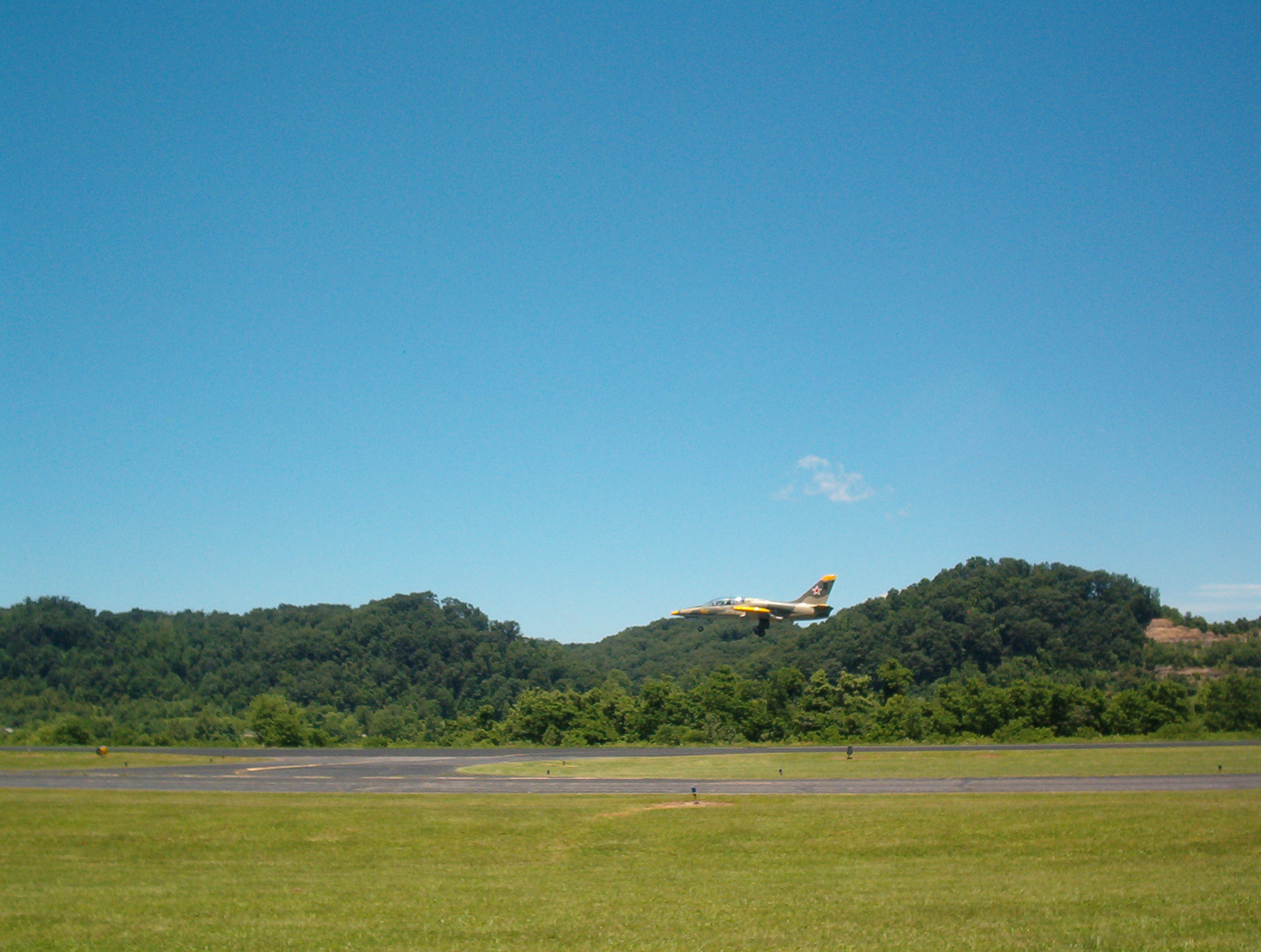
A MiG takes off from Ashland Regional Airport.

The city sits within the Raceland-Worthington Independent School District, which also includes the neighboring city of Raceland. All of the district's schools, including Raceland-Worthington High School, are located at the district's main campus in Raceland.

== Ashland Regional Airport ==
Located in Worthington, and named for nearby Ashland, the Ashland Regional Airport was once used extensively by the oil manufacturing company Ashland Inc. before the company's corporate headquarters was moved from Russell to Covington. Currently, the airport serves local charter and private aircraft. Recently, community events, such as car and air shows, have also taken place at the airport.

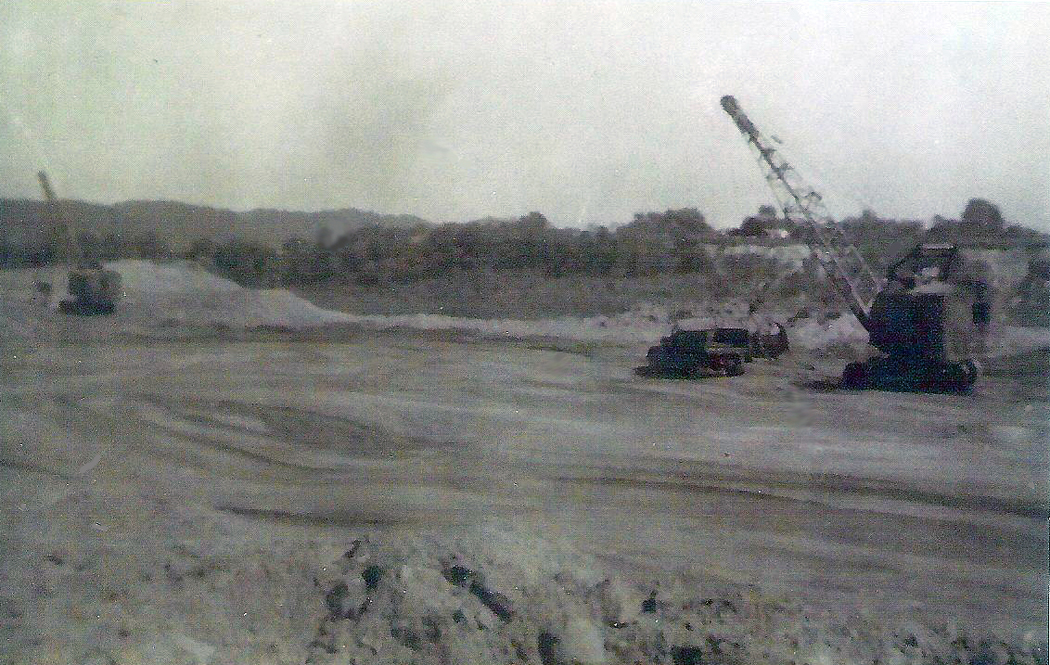
The Gravel Pit

The current Ohio River backwater called the Gravel Pit was a sand and pea gravel quarry from the 1930s until the construction of the Greenup Lock and Dam in 1962.

== Notable person ==
- Corporal John W. Collier, Medal of Honor recipient for his service during the Korean War

== See also ==
- List of cities and towns along the Ohio River
