= Pan Zareta =

20th-century American Thoroughbred race mare

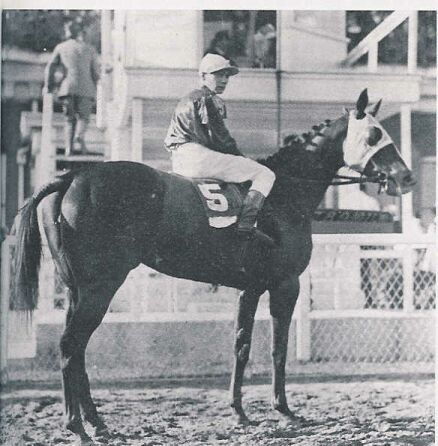
- Pan Zareta
- Sire: Abe Frank
- Grandsire: Hanover
- Dam: Caddie Griffith
- Damsire: Rancocas
- Sex: Mare
- Foaled: 1910
- Country: US
- Colour: Chestnut
- Breeder: James F. Newman
- Owner: Hart S. Newman; Edward T. Colton (12/1916); Joseph Marrone (11/1917)
- Trainer: Hart S. Newman, E. "Doc" Foucon, J. C. Kirkpatrick, Edward T. Colton
- Record: 151: 76-31-21
- Earnings: $39,082

Major wins
- Senoritas Stakes; Rio Grande Stakes; Chihuahua Stakes; Chapultepec Handicap; Juarez Handicap; Katonah Handicap

Awards
- U.S. Champion Older Female Horse (1914)

Honors
- Fair Grounds Racing Hall of Fame (1971); United States Racing Hall of Fame (1972); Texas Horse Racing Hall of Fame (1999); Pan Zareta Handicap (Fair Grounds Race Course); Stallion Stakes (Pan Zareta Division) (Lone Star Park)
- Last updated on October 30, 2021

Pan Zareta (born 1910) was an American Thoroughbred racehorse who won 76 races and was known as the "Queen of the Turf.". She raced in eight different states of America as well as Mexico and Canada. While she never won a significant race, and only once beat a top-level horse in (Old Rosebud), she was still highly regarded as the Queen of the Turf.

== Background ==
Pan Zareta was bred by James F. Newman at his ranch in Sweetwater, Texas. Her sire was Abe Frank, and her mother was Caddie Griffith, sired by Rancocas. Pan Zareta's lineage traced back to Hanover and Hindoo on her multiple stakes-winning sire's side (Abe Frank), and to Leamington on her dam's side (Caddie Griffith). Pan Zareta's third dam on her mother's side, the 1869 Texas-born Mittie Stephens, caused a problem; Mittie Stephens was listed in the American Stud Book as a "non-thoroughbred". Still, due to some complexities in the rulings, Pan Zareta was considered a Thoroughbred. However, neither Pan Zareta's dam, Caddie Griffith, nor Pan Zareta herself appear in the American Stud Book.

== Racing career ==
Trained initially by owner Hart Newman, son of James F., the filly was known as "Panzy" (she was named for Panzy Zareta, the daughter of the once mayor of Cd. Juárez, Chihuahua, Mexico). She traveled the country, appearing virtually anywhere. She was ridden by anyone handy and trained by an assortment of individuals. Newman hired "Doc" Foucon to take over for him and her second owner Edward T. Colton trained for himself. Pan Zareta made 151 starts and won 76, both being more than any other mare in U.S. racing history. On 24 different tracks, she always carried higher weights than any of her rivals, males as well as females, often up to 140 pounds (she once carried 146 pounds, giving away 46 pounds to the runner up. She carried 126 pounds or more 48 times, and won 21 of those races. Pan Zareta finished in the top three 128 times; she was in the money in 85 percent of her starts. She competed for relatively small purses that averaged $300 (the largest purse she ever earned amounted to $1,050). Her career earnings totalled $39,082.

Pan Zareta's most important wins came in the Senoritas Stakes, the Rio Grande Stakes, the Chihuahua Stakes, the Chapultepec Handicap, the Juarez Handicap, and the Katonah Handicap. In 1914, Pan Zareta was the Champion Older Female.

She equaled or set eleven track records during her racing career, most notably when at the age of five on February 10, 1915. She set the world record for five furlongs,(:57 1/5) at Juarez that went unbeaten for 31 years, running against Joe Blair, who carried ten pounds less than she did.

On March 24, 1917, Pan Zareta met Old Rosebud, winner of the 1914 Kentucky Derby, and Colonel Venie on the track. Pan Zareta won, with Colonel Venie receiving second, and Old Rosebud finishing last. When they met a second time on April 6, Old Rosebud gained first, and Pan Zareta came in third.

== Stud record ==
Pan Zareta was retired as a broodmare in 1918 but failed to conceive a foal, and was thus sent back to the races. While in training in 1918, at eight years of age, Pan Zareta contracted pneumonia and died in her stall at the Fair Grounds Race Course in New Orleans on Christmas Day. She was buried in the infield of the Fair Grounds next to Kentucky Derby winner Black Gold.

== Honors ==
Pan Zareta was elected to the National Museum of Racing and Hall of Fame in 1972 and into the Texas Horse Racing Hall of Fame in 1999. A sprint race named after her, the Pan Zareta Handicap, is run at the Fair Grounds each year.
