= William D. Hassett Jr. =

American businessman

William D. “Bill” Hassett Jr. (April 3, 1936 – March 13, 2000) was an American businessman who served as New York State Commerce Commissioner and president of the Boston Bruins.

== Buffalo native ==
Bill Hassett was a native of Buffalo, New York, and a graduate of Canisius College. In 1961, he opened his own real estate firm, establishing W.D. Hassett, Inc., which would take over management of the Liberty Bank Building, then Buffalo's largest office building. For the next decade, Hassett handled some of the Buffalo area's largest real estate deals.

== Real estate career ==
Hassett worked as a real estate developer, agent, and manager in Buffalo, New York, New York City, and Long Island, New York. Among the properties he owned was the Statler Hotel in Buffalo. Hassett was an early champion of Buffalo's downtown renewal. He also was an early mover on assisted living development projects, including on Long Island as a partner in Hassett-Belfer Senior Housing and Services. He served in a variety of real estate and development consulting capacities, including to assist in portfolio strategy and financial turnaround. He was a River Bank and RB Asset Board Director, a member of the New York State Comptroller's Real Estate Advisory Committee to the Common Retirement Fund, and served as a director of Olympia & York Holdings (USA), a real estate development and management firm.

== Public service ==
Hassett served as chairman of the New York State Urban Development Corporation (1977-1981) and the Battery Park City Authority (1979-1981), an agency for the development of the Lower Manhattan waterfront. From 1979 to 1981 he was New York State Commerce Commissioner. During this time, he was instrumental in growing the enduring I Love New York campaign, including for the 1980 Winter Olympics in Lake Placid, New York. He was the most prominent Republican in the Democratic administration of Governor Hugh Carey. He later served as a trustee of the State University of New York and the chairman of the Dormitory Authority of the State of New York (1985-1994).

== Boston Bruins ==
On May 30, 1986, Hassett was named chairman and chief executive officer of the Boston Bruins and the Boston Garden. In this role his major responsibility was working on Delaware North's renovation plan for the Garden. It was later decided to redevelop the property instead of renovating the arena. On March 24, 1987, he was named Bruins team president. He resigned on December 1, 1988, after Delaware North chairman and CEO Jeremy Jacobs elected not to give Hassett a minority share in the New Boston Garden deal.

== Jazz label ==
Hassett established a record label with Tony Bennett, Improv Records, producing live recordings of Bennett and other legendary jazz musicians during the 1970s.

== Later life and death ==
In 1990, Hassett led a group that unsuccessfully tried to gain control of the St. Louis Blues. Throughout the 1990s, Hassett continued to engage in real estate development and community service. Hassett died on March 13, 2000, in Memorial Sloan–Kettering Cancer Center. He was 63 years old. He is survived by his six children, Eva, William, Joseph, Ellen, Elizabeth, and Caroline.

Preceded by John S. Dyson	New York State Commerce Commissioner; 1979–81	Succeeded by George G. Dempster
Preceded by Paul A. Mooney	President of the Boston Bruins; 1987–88	Succeeded by Harry Sinden
