= Traffic Judge =

American-bred Thoroughbred racehorse

- Sire: Alibhai
- Grandsire: Hyperion
- Dam: Traffic Court
- Damsire: Discovery
- Sex: Stallion
- Foaled: 1952
- Country: United States
- Colour: Bay
- Breeder: Philip Connors
- Owner: 1) Clifford Mooers; 2) Louis P. Doherty (12/1956)
- Trainer: 1) Woody Stephens; 2) James W. Maloney
- Record: 44: 13-11-3
- Earnings: US$432,450

Major wins
- Prairie State Stakes (1954); Withers Stakes (1955); Ohio Derby (1955); Ventnor Turf Handicap (1955); Jerome Handicap (1955); Woodward Stakes (1955); Laurel Turf Cup Handicap (1956); Metropolitan Handicap (1957); Suburban Handicap (1957)

Traffic Judge (1952–1972) was an American Thoroughbred racehorse. He was owned by Clifford Mooers, proprietor of Walnut Springs Farm in Lexington, Kentucky, and trained by future U.S. Racing Hall of Fame inductee, Woody Stephens. On November 13, 1956, Clifford Mooers died of a heart attack at New York City's LaGuardia Airport while en route to see Traffic Judge compete in the Narragansett Special. His estate auctioned the horse and on December 24 he was purchased for $362,345.70 by Louis P. Doherty, owner of The Stallion Station on Muir Station Road in Lexington, Kentucky. Traffic Judge's race conditioning was then taken over by another Hall of Fame inductee, James W. Maloney.

Traffic Judge showed some promise at age two when he won the 1954 Prairie State Stakes at Washington Park Race Track in Chicago. In the 1955 U.S. Triple Crown series, Traffic Judge did not run in the Kentucky Derby or Belmont Stakes but did compete in the Preakness Stakes and finished third to winner Nashua. Traffic Judge did however win several important races that year including the Ohio Derby the Ventnor Turf Handicap and the Jerome Handicap for three-year-olds as well as the Woodward Stakes, a major weight-for-age race against older horses.

Traffic Judge won the Laurel Turf Cup Handicap at age four and at age five won two major races for older horses, the Metropolitan and Suburban Handicaps.

Retired to stud, Traffic Judge was the sire of Traffic, the 1963 Hopeful Stakes winner in the United States who went on to stand at stud in France where he was the 1971 Leading sire. Other of Traffic Judge's progeny who were successful in racing included multiple stakes winners Green Ticket (1959), Traffic Mark (1966), Judgeable (1969) and Grade 1 winner Court Ruling (1970). In addition, he sired Best In Show (1965) who was voted Kentucky Broodmare of the Year in 1982.

Traffic Judge died at age twenty in 1972 and was buried at The Stallion Station now known as 505 Farm.

== Sire line tree ==
- Traffic Judge
  - Green Ticket
  - Delta Judge
  - Traffic
    - Rheffic
      - Dom Pasquini
        - Dom Alco
          - Neptune Collonges
          - Silviniaco Conti
  - Traffic Bridge
    - Branch County
  - Court Recess
  - Traffic Mark
  - Judgeable
  - Rest Your Case
  - Traffic Cop
    - Deputed Testamony
      - Testafly
  - Court Ruling

== Pedigree ==
Pedigree of Traffic Judge, bay stallion, 1952
Sire Alibhai	Hyperion	Gainsborough	Bayardo
Sire Alibhai	Hyperion	Gainsborough	Rosedrop
Sire Alibhai	Hyperion	Selene	Chaucer
Sire Alibhai	Hyperion	Selene	Serenissima
Sire Alibhai	Teresina	Tracery*	Rock Sand*
Sire Alibhai	Teresina	Tracery*	Topiary*
Sire Alibhai	Teresina	Blue Tit	Wildfowler
Sire Alibhai	Teresina	Blue Tit	Petit Blue
Dam Traffic Court	Discovery	Display	Fair Play
Dam Traffic Court	Discovery	Display	Cicuta
Dam Traffic Court	Discovery	Ariadne	Light Brigade
Dam Traffic Court	Discovery	Ariadne	Adrienne
Dam Traffic Court	Traffic	Broomstick	Ben Brush
Dam Traffic Court	Traffic	Broomstick	Elf
Dam Traffic Court	Traffic	Traverse	Tracery*
Dam Traffic Court	Traffic	Traverse	Perverse (family: 3-n)

* Traffic Judge is inbred 3S x 4D to the stallion Tracery, meaning that he appears third generation on the sire side of his pedigree, and fourth generation on the dam side of his pedigree.
