= Raceland-Worthington Independent School District =

School district in Kentucky

Raceland-Worthington Independent School District is a school district headquartered in Raceland, Kentucky; it serves Raceland and Worthington.

Its schools:

- Campbell Elementary School (Raceland) (K–2)
- Raceland-Worthington Middle School (Raceland) (3–8)
- Raceland-Worthington High School (Raceland) (9–12)
