= Joseph LaCombe =

Joseph P. LaCombe
- Born: October 9, 1932 (age 93); Brooklyn, New York, U.S.
- Occupations: Businessman: Financial Auditing; Racehorse owner

Joseph P. LaCombe (born October 9, 1932 in Brooklyn, New York) is a retired American businessman and owner of Joseph LaCombe Stable Inc., a Thoroughbred horse racing stable. He is a former executive of a national accounts payable auditing business and one of the corporation's regional franchise owners.

LaCombe first became involved in Thoroughbred racing as a part owner of horses but in February 1997 purchased at auction a 2-year-old that would be the first he owned outright. That colt was Favorite Trick who that year would win all eight of his starts including the 1997 Breeders' Cup Juvenile and become the first 2-year-old in twenty-five years to be voted United States Horse of the Year since Secretariat accomplished the feat in 1972.

Other horses owned and raced by LaCombe includes Polished Brass, winner of the 1997 Sanford Stakes, Deputy Glitters, winner of the 2006 Ohio Derby and Tampa Bay Derby, Slew's Tizzy, who in 2007 won the Lexington Stakes and Lone Star Derby, and Azul Leon, winner of the G3 Hollywood Juvenile Championship S. and the G2 Best Pal Stakes.
