= Raceland, Kentucky =

- City
- Location of Raceland in Greenup County, Kentucky.
- Coordinates: 38°32′13″N 82°43′52″W
- Country: United States
- State: Kentucky
- County: Greenup
- Established: July 31, 1915
- Named for: Raceland horse race track

Government
  - Type: Mayor-Council
  - Mayor: Tony W. Wilson

Area
  - Total: 2.48 sq mi (6.42 km^{2})
  - Land: 2.48 sq mi (6.42 km^{2})
  - Water: 0 sq mi (0.00 km^{2})
- Elevation: 545 ft (166 m)

Population (2020)
  - Total: 2,343
  - Estimate (2022): 2,313
  - Density: 945.9/sq mi (365.21/km^{2})
- Time zone: UTC-5 (Eastern (EST))
  - Summer (DST): UTC-4 (EDT)
- ZIP code: 41169-1111
- Area code: 606
- FIPS code: 21-63858
- GNIS feature ID: 0501513
- Website: www.racelandky.gov

Raceland is a home rule-class city in Greenup County, Kentucky, United States, in the Ohio River valley. As of the 2020 census, the population was 2,343. It is part of the Huntington–Ashland metropolitan area.

== History ==
The city of Raceland and the land surrounding it were part of a 5,000-acre (20 km^{2}) Revolutionary War grant to Abraham Buford. His son, Charles Buford, divided up the land and sold it in tracts. Eventually, one of the tracts was bequeathed to Benjamen Chinn, who sold his tract in town lots. He gave the town the name "Chinnville". Its first post office was established on March 7, 1910. It became an incorporated city on July 31, 1915.

In 1924, Jack O. Keene (who later established Keeneland in Lexington, Kentucky), opened Raceland Race Course near the city. Due to this, the town was renamed Raceland on April 1, 1925. The racetrack was eventually abandoned and the city was once again named Chinnville, but on April 1, 1930, the city was again named Raceland.

== Geography ==
Raceland is located in eastern Greenup County at 38°32′13″N 82°43′52″W (38.537003, -82.731137). It is bordered to the north by the city of Worthington, to the southeast by the city of Flatwoods, and at its far northwest corner by the city of Wurtland. U.S. Route 23 (Seaton Avenue) is the main highway through Raceland, leading southeast 7 miles (11 km) to Ashland and northwest 25 miles (40 km) to Portsmouth, Ohio.

According to the United States Census Bureau, Raceland has a total area of 2.5 square miles (6.4 km^{2}), all land.

== Demographics ==
Historical population
Census	Pop.	Note	%±
1930	1,088		—
1940	1,046		−3.9%
1950	1,001		−4.3%
1960	1,115		11.4%
1970	1,857		66.5%
1980	1,970		6.1%
1990	2,256		14.5%
2000	2,355		4.4%
2010	2,424		2.9%
2020	2,343		−3.3%
2022 (est.)	2,313		−1.3%
U.S. Decennial Census

=== 2020 census ===
As of the 2020 census, Raceland had a population of 2,343. The median age was 45.2 years. 20.7% of residents were under the age of 18 and 20.0% of residents were 65 years of age or older. For every 100 females there were 88.8 males, and for every 100 females age 18 and over there were 85.0 males age 18 and over.

96.5% of residents lived in urban areas, while 3.5% lived in rural areas.

There were 1,010 households in Raceland, of which 29.8% had children under the age of 18 living in them. Of all households, 47.8% were married-couple households, 16.2% were households with a male householder and no spouse or partner present, and 29.4% were households with a female householder and no spouse or partner present. About 28.1% of all households were made up of individuals and 13.0% had someone living alone who was 65 years of age or older.

There were 1,132 housing units, of which 10.8% were vacant. The homeowner vacancy rate was 2.6% and the rental vacancy rate was 14.0%.

Racial composition as of the 2020 census
Race	Number	Percent
White	2,240	95.6%
Black or African American	13	0.6%
American Indian and Alaska Native	6	0.3%
Asian	5	0.2%
Native Hawaiian and Other Pacific Islander	0	0.0%
Some other race	9	0.4%
Two or more races	70	3.0%
Hispanic or Latino (of any race)	11	0.5%

=== 2000 census ===
As of the 2000 census, there were 2,355 people, 935 households, and 707 families residing in the city. The population density was 1,068.3 inhabitants per square mile (412.5/km^{2}). There were 1,002 housing units at an average density of 454.5 per square mile (175.5/km^{2}). The racial makeup of the city was 99.07% White, 0.47% African American, 0.04% Native American, 0.04% Asian, and 0.38% from two or more races. Hispanic or Latino of any race were 0.34% of the population.

There were 935 households, out of which 33.0% had children under the age of 18 living with them, 59.6% were married couples living together, 12.8% had a female householder with no husband present, and 24.3% were non-families. 21.6% of all households were made up of individuals, and 9.3% had someone living alone who was 65 years of age or older. The average household size was 2.52 and the average family size was 2.92.

In the city, the population was spread out, with 24.5% under the age of 18, 8.2% from 18 to 24, 29.5% from 25 to 44, 24.7% from 45 to 64, and 13.1% who were 65 years of age or older. The median age was 38 years. For every 100 females, there were 91.8 males. For every 100 females age 18 and over, there were 89.1 males.

The median income for a household in the city was $31,500, and the median income for a family was $37,955. Males had a median income of $38,906 versus $19,189 for females. The per capita income for the city was $15,537. About 10.6% of families and 13.6% of the population were below the poverty line, including 18.6% of those under age 18 and 6.9% of those age 65 or over.

== Economy ==
=== Transportation ===
Raceland is home to the Raceland Car Shop. When it was built in the 1920s, it was one of the largest railway car repair shops in the United States. The shop was built by and operated for many years by the Chesapeake and Ohio Railway and its successor company CSX Transportation and is located adjacent to CSX's Russell Classification Yard. The facility is currently owned by Progress Rail.

== Education ==
The city sits within the Raceland-Worthington Independent School District, which also includes the neighboring city of Worthington. Three schools, Campbell Elementary School (K–3), Raceland-Worthington Middle School (4–7), and Raceland-Worthington High School (9–12), are located in the city.

== Notable alumni ==
Aaron Pettrey, professional NFL kicker

Tyler Boyles, NFL assistant coach

Sebastian Johansson, professional NFL offensive lineman

== See also ==
- Raceland (race track)
- Other places named Raceland
