= Raceland (race track) =

Horse racing track in Chinnville, Kentucky

- Interactive map of Raceland
- Location: Raceland, Kentucky, United States
- Coordinates: 38.543097°N 82.749223°W
- Date opened: 1924
- Date closed: 1928
- Race type: Thoroughbred
- Course type: Flat

Raceland was a Thoroughbred racing track located in Chinnville, Kentucky, now known as Raceland, Kentucky. The race track operated from 1924 until 1928 and was founded by Jack O. Keene, who also helped develop Keeneland Race Course in Lexington, Kentucky.

Raceland made its debut on July 4, 1924, with a first-class boxing match. Over 5,000 people were in attendance. The first race, titled the "Ashland Handicap," was held on July 10, 1924, in which there were 15,000 spectators present. The inaugural Raceland Derby, according to the Daily Racing Form and Keeneland magazine, was July 28, 1924, and five horses that had been in the Kentucky Derby ran the Raceland Derby—including Black Gold, who had already won four derbies that year.

During its heyday, Raceland was known as the "Million Dollar Oval" because of its ornate appearance. The 1.5-mile-long (2.4 km) track was circled by a white fence of wood and iron, as well as rambling roses. The bridle paths and the front lawn were paved in red tapestry brick matching the club house, stewards' stand and judge's stand. The infield of the track contained a lake and several sunken gardens.

Financial difficulties forced the closure of the Raceland track in 1928.

== Present condition ==
Notable structures still standing from the original complex include the clubhouse, the manager's house, servant quarters and two horse stables. On May 26, 2004, a historical marker was unveiled near the clubhouse to commemorate the location and historical significance of Raceland. The marker, designed by local artist Tony Cumpton, reads:

The race track named "Raceland" was known as the "Million Dollar Oval." A record crowd of 27,000 packed the grandstand for the inaugural Raceland Derby in 1924. That race featured Ky. Derby winner "Black Gold" and four other Run for the Roses entrants. Town's name was changed from Chinnville to Raceland ca. 1924. The track's 350- acre complex, complete with 22 stables, a rail spur, and its own jail was built by J.O. Keene, who later built Keeneland in Lexington. Last season of racing was 1928. Track was sold and torn down in 1937.

— Kentucky Historical Marker, Raceland, Kentucky

On January 2, 2025, the last remains of the jockey station was burned in an act of arson.
