= Shorelint =

Canadian-bred Thoroughbred racehorse

- Sire: Oil Man
- Grandsire: North Star
- Dam: South Shore
- Damsire: Orme Shore
- Sex: Stallion
- Foaled: 1926
- Country: Canada
- Colour: Brown
- Breeder: Thorncliffe Stable
- Owner: Thorncliffe Stable
- Trainer: Fred H. Schelke
- Record: 54: 11-9-6
- Earnings: Can$21,985

Major wins
- Canadian Classic Race wins: King's Plate

Shorelint (foaled in 1926) was a Canadian Thoroughbred racehorse best known for winning the 1929 King's Plate, Canada's most important race. He was ridden by jockey John Mooney, a native of New Orleans, Louisiana who won the 1924 Kentucky Derby.

Shorelint's dam, South Shore, won the King's Plate in 1922.
