= Crafty Lace =

Canadian-bred Thoroughbred racehorse

- Sire: Crafty Admiral
- Grandsire: Fighting Fox
- Dam: French Lace
- Damsire: Blue Swords
- Sex: Gelding
- Foaled: 1959
- Country: Canada
- Colour: Bay
- Breeder: Conklin Farms Limited
- Owner: 1) Wilfrid Farr; 2) Jeremy Jacobs
- Trainer: J. D. Mooney
- Record: 72: 13-6-5
- Earnings: $43,440

Major wins
- Fairbank Stakes (1962); Canadian Classic Race wins: Breeders' Stakes (1962)

Awards
- Canadian Horse of the Year (1962)

Crafty Lace (foaled March 11, 1959 in Ontario) was a thoroughbred racehorse who was voted Canadian Horse of the Year in 1962.

Crafty Lace was bred by Frank C. Conklin at Conklin Farms in Brantford, Ontario. He was sired by Crafty Admiral, the 1952 American Champion Older Male Horse. His dam was French Lace, whose sire was Blue Swords, a very good runner who finished second to Count Fleet in the 1943 Kentucky Derby and Preakness Stakes.

On September 18, 1962, Crafty Lace was claimed for $7500 by trainer John Mooney for Buffalo businessman Jeremy Jacobs. The horse ran second for the first time out under Mooney's care, and then won four races in a row to set a Woodbine Racetrack record for a mile and a sixteenth on dirt. In his most important win, Crafty Lace was ridden by Ron Turcotte to a victory in the Breeders' Stakes, the third leg of the Canadian Triple Crown series that was raced on turf.
