= Ashland Regional Airport =

- IATA: none; ICAO: KDWU; FAA LID: DWU

Summary
- Airport type: Public
- Owner: Ashland Regional Airport Board
- Serves: Huntington–Ashland metropolitan area
- Location: Ashland, Kentucky
- Elevation AMSL: 546 ft (166 m)
- Coordinates: 38°33′16″N 082°44′17″W

Map
- Location of airport in Kentucky

Runways
Direction	Length		Surface
Direction	ft	m	Surface
10/28	5,602	1,707	Asphalt

Statistics (2007)
- Aircraft operations: 4,500
- Based aircraft: 47
- Source: Federal Aviation Administration

Ashland Regional Airport (ICAO: KDWU, FAA LID: DWU) is a public use airport in Worthington, Greenup County, Kentucky, owned by the Ashland Regional Airport Board. It is located six nautical miles (11 km) northwest of the central business district of Ashland, a city in Boyd County, Kentucky, United States. Currently, the airport serves local charter and private aircraft. Community events, such as car and air shows, also take place at the airport.

Although most U.S. airports use the same three-letter location identifier for the FAA and IATA, this airport is assigned DWU by the FAA but has no designation from the IATA.

== History ==
It opened in 1953 as Ashland-Boyd County Airport and featured a 5,000 ft (1,500 m) runway with a 3,000 ft (910 m) clearance.

The airport was once used extensively by the oil manufacturing company Ashland Inc. before the company's corporate headquarters was moved from Russell to Covington.

== Facilities and aircraft ==
Ashland Regional Airport covers an area of 170 acres (69 ha) at an elevation of 546 feet (166 m) above mean sea level. It has one asphalt paved runway designated 10/28 which measures 5,602 by 100 feet (1,707 x 30 m).

For the 12-month period ending July 23, 2007, the airport had 4,500 aircraft operations, an average of 12 per day: 96% general aviation, 2% air taxi and 2% military. At that time there were 47 aircraft based at this airport: 77% single-engine, 15% multi-engine, 4% jet and 4% helicopter.

== See also ==
- List of airports in Kentucky
- Transportation in Huntington, West Virginia
