= J. D. Mooney =

American jockey and trainer (1901–1966)

Personal information
- Born: November 24, 1901 New Orleans, Louisiana, U.S.
- Died: November 16, 1966 (aged 64) Toronto, Ontario, Canada
- Occupation: Jockey / Trainer

Horse racing career
- Sport: Horse racing
- Career wins: 261 (USA)

Major racing wins
- As a jockey: Arlington Handicap (1920); Oakdale Handicap (1920); Southampton Handicap (1921, 1923); Mardi Gras Handicap (1922, 1924); Stafford Handicap (1922); Louisiana Derby (1923, 1924); San Carlo Handicap (1923); Derby Trial Stakes (1924); Ohio State Derby (1924); Chicago Derby (1924); Toronto Cup Stakes (1925) American Classic Race wins: Kentucky Derby (1924); Canadian Classic Race wins: King's Plate (1929) As a trainer: Canadian Classic Race wins: Breeders' Stakes (1962)

Honours
- Louisiana Sports Hall of Fame (1976); Fair Grounds Racing Hall of Fame (1999)

Significant horses
- Black Gold, Shorelint, Crafty Lace

John David Mooney (November 24, 1901 – November 16, 1966) better known as J. D. Mooney was an American jockey and trainer who won the 1924 Kentucky Derby on Black Gold and the 1929 King's Plate on Shorelint.

== Early life ==
John David Mooney was born on November 24, 1901, in New Orleans. His father, Alexander Mooney, was an Irish immigrant who worked as a cemetery sexton. This job included caring for the horses used for funeral services and allowed Mooney to learn how to ride the animal. Mooney's brother, Joe, was also a jockey. To avoid confusion between the two, Mooney went by the name J.D. Mooney and his brother went by J.A. Mooney. J.A. Mooney was banned from racing in 1925 for his part in a race fixing scandal at Latonia Race Track.

== Jockey ==
In his youth, Mooney worked as a stable boy at the Fair Grounds Race Course. He became an apprentice jockey at the age of 18, riding in his first official race on May 10, 1920, at Churchill Downs. He won his first race seven days later. He later returned to New Orleans and was the leading rider at the Fair Grounds during the 1920–21 winter season. In 1922, he broke the Churchill mile record aboard Sands of Pleasure. In 1923, he won the Louisiana Derby on Amole, set the mile record at Blue Bonnets aboard Marine, and rode In Memoriam to an eleventh-place finish in that year's Kentucky Derby. Later that year, he became the regular ride for Harry Payne Whitney's Whiskaway. At Latonia Race Track, Whiskaway broke the one mile and 70 yard world record.

In 1922, Mooney approached trainer Hanley Webb about riding Black Gold, but was rebuffed due to Webb's dissatisfaction with Mooney's previous performance on another of his horses. After poor performances by other jockeys, Webb eventually gave Mooney an opportunity to ride Black Gold in 1924. Mooney led Black Gold to victory in the Louisiana Derby and the Derby Trial Stakes and they were the favorites to win the 1924 Kentucky Derby. Although Black Gold was bumped at the start, the horse was able to recover and won the race by three-quarters of a length. For his efforts, Mooney received $10,000. In total, Mooney made $37,000 in 1924.

Mooney was less successful in 1925 and 1926, but did ride a number of good horses including future Preakness Stakes winner Display. Health issues brought on by frequently having to cut weight caused him to retire in 1928. He attempted a comeback in 1929 and won the King's Plate on Shorelint two weeks after his license was reinstated. His final victory came on December 1, 1930, in a claiming race at Jefferson Park Race Track in Metairie, Louisiana. His last race was on March 21, 1931, at the same track.

Mooney's record included 261 victories, 258 seconds, and 280 thirds. He was in the money 30 percent of the time. He was inducted into the Louisiana Sports Hall of Fame and the Fair Grounds Racing Hall of Fame.

== Trainer ==
Health issues eventually forced Mooney to retire for good. By 1938, he owned a stable of five horses. He trained 1962 Canadian Horse of the Year Crafty Lace.

== Personal life ==
In 1923, Mooney married Marjorie Heffering, daughter of Canadian horseman Jim Heffering. They had three children including John J. Mooney, a horse racing executive and a member of the Canadian Horse Racing Hall of Fame, and Paul A. Mooney, president of the Boston Bruins. Grandsons John Mooney, Daniel Mooney and Mike Mooney were also involved in Thoroughbred racing.
