= Tampa Bay Derby =

- Class: Grade III
- Location: Tampa Bay Downs; Oldsmar, Florida, United States
- Inaugurated: 1981
- Race type: Thoroughbred – Flat racing
- Sponsor: Lambholm South (since 2016)
- Website: Tampa Bay Downs

Race information
- Distance: 1 1/16 miles
- Surface: Dirt
- Track: left-handed
- Qualification: Three-year-olds
- Weight: 123 lbs with allowances
- Purse: $400,000 (since 2018)
- Bonuses: purse includes $50,000 for Florida breds

The Tampa Bay Derby is a Grade III American Thoroughbred horse race for three years old horses over the distance of 1 1/16 miles (8.5 furlongs) on the dirt scheduled annually in March at Tampa Bay Downs racetrack in Oldsmar, Florida. The event currently carries a purse of $500,000.

== History ==
The inaugural running of the event was on 21 March 1981 as the Budweiser Tampa Bay Derby Stakes with sponsorship for Budweiser making it the richest stakes race at the track. The event was won by the long shot Paristo, who was part of the field entry of horses at the odds of 35-1 in a time of 1:45 2/5. Such was the immediate impact the event had that in 1984 the event was classified as Grade III. Budweiser ceased their sponsorship in 1987.

The event was downgraded to Listed in 1991 and held this status until 2002 when it was upgraded back to Grade III.

In 2007, Street Sense became the first Tampa Bay Derby participant to win the Kentucky Derby. In 2010, Super Saver won the Kentucky Derby after finishing third in the Tampa Bay Derby.

In 2011 the event was upgraded to Grade II.

From 1995–2010, the Tampa Bay Derby and the Florida Oaks were run on the same race card. They were again presented on the same day in 2013, along with the Hillsborough Stakes, providing fans three graded stakes worth a combined $700,000.

The race has gained in popularity over the past few years and is now listed as high profile Championship series event on the Road to the Kentucky Derby.

Since 2016, the race has been called the Lambholm South Tampa Bay Derby due to sponsorship.

In 2023 the American Graded Stakes Committee of the Thoroughbred Owners and Breeders Association downgraded the event back to Grade III.

The 2024 edition of the race was run for purse money only with no wagering after problems from telecommunications supplier Lumen Technologies affected tote provider AmTote, leaving Tampa Bay Downs and several other tracks around the country unable to process wagers.

For the 2027 edition of the race, the prize money offered is to be increased by $100,000, raising the total to $500,000.

== Records ==
Speed record:

- 1:41.90 – Tacitus (2019)

Margins:

- 5 lengths – Thundering Storm (1996), Carpe Diem (2015)

Most wins by a jockey:

- 2 – Richard Migliore (2000, 2001)
- 2 – Pat Day (1998, 2004)
- 2 – Eibar Coa (2003, 2008)
- 2 – Daniel Centeno (2009, 2014)
- 2 – John Velazquez (2013, 2015)
- 2 – Jose L. Ortiz (2017, 2019)

Most wins by a trainer:

- 6 – Todd A. Pletcher (2004, 2013, 2015, 2016, 2017, 2023)

Most wins by an owner:

- 2 – Eric Fein (2008, 2009)
- 2 – WinStar Farm (2015, 2018)

== Winners ==
Year	Winner	Jockey	Trainer	Owner	Time	Purse	Grade	Ref
2026	The Puma	Javier Castellano	Gustavo Delgado	OGMA Investments, JR Ranch & High Step Racing	1:43.23	$350,000	III	
2025	Owen Almighty	Irad Ortiz Jr.	Brian A. Lynch	Flying Dutchman Breeding and Racing LLC	1:42.30	$350,000	III	
2024	Domestic Product	Tyler Gaffalione	Chad C. Brown	Klaravich Stables	1:45.47	$350,000	III	
2023	Tapit Trice	Luis Saez	Todd A. Pletcher	Whisper Hill Farm & Gainesway Farm	1:43.37	$360,000	III	
2022	Classic Causeway	Irad Ortiz Jr.	Brian A. Lynch	Clarke M. Cooper Family Trust & Kentucky West Racing	1:44.90	$350,000	II	
2021	Helium	Jose C. Ferrer	Mark E. Casse	D. J. Stable LLC	1:43.55	$350,000	II	
2020	King Guillermo	Samy Camacho	Juan Carlos Avila	Victoria's Ranch	1:42.63	$351,500	II	
2019	Tacitus	Jose L. Ortiz	William I. Mott	Juddmonte Farms	1:41.90	$355,000	II	
2018	Quip	Florent Geroux	Rodolphe Brisset	WinStar Farm, China Horse Club & SF Racing	1:44.72	$355,000	II	
2017	Tapwrit	Jose L. Ortiz	Todd A. Pletcher	Bridlewood Farm, Eclipse Thoroughbred & Robert V. LaPenta	1:42.36	$350,000	II	
2016	Destin	Javier Castellano	Todd A. Pletcher	Twin Creeks Racing Stables	1:42.82	$350,000	II	
2015	Carpe Diem	John R. Velazquez	Todd A. Pletcher	WinStar Farm & Stonestreet Stables	1:43.60	$350,000	II	
2014	Ring Weekend	Daniel Centeno	H. Graham Motion	St. Elias Stable & West Point Thoroughbreds	1:43.71	$350,000	II	
2013	Verrazano	John R. Velazquez	Todd A. Pletcher	Let's Go Stable, Derrick Smith, Mrs. John Magnier & Michael Tabor	1:43.96	$350,000	II	
2012	Prospective	Luis Contreras	Mark E. Casse	John C. Oxley	1:43.35	$350,000	II	
2011	Watch Me Go	Luis Garcia	Kathleen O'Connell	Gilbert G. Campbell	1:44.25	$350,000	II	
2010	Odysseus	Rajiv Maragh	Thomas Albertrani	Padua Stables	1:44.31	$300,000	III	
2009	Musket Man	Daniel Centeno	Derek S. Ryan	Eric Fein & Vic Carlson	1:43.67	$300,000	III	
2008	Big Truck	Eibar Coa	Barclay Tagg	Eric Fein	1:44.25	$300,000	III	
2007	Street Sense	Calvin H. Borel	Carl A. Nafzger	James B. Tafel	1:43.11	$300,000	III	
2006	Deputy Glitters	Jose Lezcano	Thomas Albertrani	Joseph Lacombe Stable	1:44.26	$250,000	III	
2005	Sun King	Edgar S. Prado	Nicholas P. Zito	Tracy Farmer	1:43.98	$250,000	III	
2004	Limehouse	Pat Day	Todd A. Pletcher	Dogwood Stable	1:43.99	$250,000	III	
2003	Region of Merit	Eibar Coa	Christophe Clement	Calumet Farm	1:44.61	$250,000	III	
2002	Equality	Ramon A. Dominguez	H. Graham Motion	Pin Oak Stable	1:43.66	$200,000	III	
2001	§ Burning Roma	Richard Migliore	Heather A. Giglio	Harold L. Queen	1:44.30	$200,000	Listed	
2000	Wheelaway	Richard Migliore	John C. Kimmel	Caesar P. Kimmel & Philip J. Solondz Kimmel	1:43.90	$150,000	Listed	
1999	Pineaff	Jose A. Santos	Kenneth G. McPeek	Roy & Joyce Monroe	1:45.20	$150,000	Listed	
1998	Parade Ground	Pat Day	Neil J. Howard	William S. Farish III & Stephen S. Hilbert	1:45.40	$150,000	Listed	
1997	Zede	Jerry Bailey	William I. Mott	Allen E. Paulson	1:44.80	$150,000	Listed	
1996	Thundering Storm	Jorge A. Guerra	Don R. Rice	Deborah J. Artz	1:43.80	$150,000	Listed	
1995	Gadzook	Gary Boulanger	J. Bert Sonnier	Du-Zee Stables	1:45.20	$150,000	Listed	
1994	Prix de Crouton	Mickey Walls	Lorne E. Berg	Lorne & Kathleen Berg	1:46.60	$150,000	Listed	
1993	Marco Bay	Ronald Dale Allen Jr.	Sarah A. Lundy	Jay Shaw	1:44.40	$150,000	Listed	
1992	Careful Gesture	Robert Neal Lester	Elbert R. Dixon	Cecilia Dixon	1:45.80	$200,000	Listed	
1991	Speedy Cure	Ricardo D. Lopez	Harvey Culp	Susan B. Fisher	1:46.20	$150,000	Listed	
1990	Champagneforashley	Jacinto Vasquez	Howard M. Tesher	Robert Baker, Howard Kaskel & Leon Feinbloom	1:44.60	$150,000	III	
1989	Storm Predictions	Steve Gaffalione	Luis Olivares	Three G Stables	1:43.80	$150,000	III	
1988	Cefis	Eddie Maple	Woodford C. Stephens	Ryehill Farm & R. Kirkham Partnership	1:44.40	$150,000	III	
1987	Phantom Jet	K. Keith Allen	Philip A. Gleaves	Aisco Stables	1:43.80	$150,000	III	
1986	My Prince Charming	Craig Perret	Newcomb Green	Don Aronow Stable	1:46.60	$159,000	III	
1985	Regal Remark	Jeffrey Fell	James E. Day	Sam-Son Farm	1:46.80	$158,100	III	
1984	Bold Southerner	Wayne Crews	Paul M. Maxwell	Rusticwoods Farm	1:44.60	$160,000	III	
1983	Morganmorganmorgan	Willie Rodriguez	Arthur Monteiro	Morgan Bishop	1:47.20	$100,000		
1982	Reinvested	Rick D. Luhr	Stanley M. Hough	Harbor View Farm	1:45.20	$66,900		
1981	‡ Paristo	David C. Ashcroft	George R. Handy	Belmont Farm	1:45.40	$72,600		

Notes:
§ Ran as an entry
‡ Ran as the field entry

== See also ==
- Road to the Kentucky Derby
- List of American and Canadian Graded races

== External sites ==
Tampa Bay Downs Media Guide 2021
