= Black Gold (horse) =

American-bred Thoroughbred racehorse

- Black Gold at the Fair Grounds Race Course
- Sire: Black Toney
- Grandsire: Peter Pan I
- Dam: U-See-It
- Damsire: Bonnie Joe
- Sex: Stallion
- Foaled: 1921
- Country: United States
- Color: Black
- Breeder: Rosa M. Hoots
- Owner: Rosa M. Hoots
- Trainer: Hanley Webb
- Record: 35:18-5-4
- Earnings: $111,553

Major wins
- Bashford Manor Stakes (1923); Louisiana Derby (1924); Derby Trial (1924); Ohio State Derby (1924); Chicago Derby (1924) U.S. Triple Crown series: Kentucky Derby (1924)

Honors
- Buried in the infield of the New Orleans Fair Grounds; Black Gold Stakes; Fair Grounds Racing Hall of Fame (1971); United States Racing Hall of Fame (1989)

Black Gold (February 17, 1921 – January 18, 1928) was an American Thoroughbred racehorse that won the 50th running of the Kentucky Derby in 1924.

== Background ==
Black Gold's dam, U-See-it (spelled "Useeit" in registries), was owned by Al Hoots. As a racemare, U-See-it was not fashionably bred, but she was fast. There was only one horse the Oklahoma-bred never beat in her 6-furlong races at small western tracks: the Hall of Famer Pan Zareta. U-See-it won 34 races in 132 starts, and her purse money supported Al Hoots and his wife Rosa. The Hootses lived in Indian territory and were well known on the Texas/New Orleans racing circuit. In 1916, Al Hoots entered U-See-it into a claiming race in Ciudad Juárez, Mexico, where she was claimed. When Hoots refused to give the mare to her new owner, he and U-See-it were banned from racing for life.

By 1917, Al was dying. In certain versions of the story, he dreamed that if U-See-it were bred to one of the leading sires of the time, the foal she carried would win the Kentucky Derby. In other versions, Al merely hoped that this could happen. When oil was discovered in what is now Oklahoma, Rosa Hoots (who was a member of the Osage Nation) had enough money to ship U-See-it to the Idle Hour Stock Farm in Lexington, Kentucky, where Colonel E. R. Bradley's Black Toney stood at stud. The result was a black colt, who they named "Black Gold" for his color and for the nickname of oil, which had recently been discovered in Oklahoma. Hanley Webb (or Hedley or Harry, depending on the source), who had been a close friend of Al Hoots and also trained U-See-it, was Black Gold's trainer. The man who groomed and exercised him was also his regular jockey, J. D. Mooney

There is also a book called Black Gold, by Marguerite Henry and tells about Black Gold's life. The Useeit Stakes is run at Remington Park in U-See-It's honor.

== Racing career ==
Beginning at the New Orleans Fair Grounds on January 8, 1923, Black Gold won nine races in 18 starts as a two-year-old, including his finale. When he came out as a three-year-old, he won his first two races, then moved up into Stakes company in the Louisiana Derby. He led from the start, splashing through mud to wire the field and win by six lengths. Mrs. Hoots was reportedly offered $50,000 for her colt, but turned it down. After shipping to Churchill Downs in the spring, Black Gold won the Derby Trial.

Black Gold went into the 1924 running of the Derby as the favorite. In 1924, the Kentucky Derby was fifty years old and was therefore celebrated as the "Golden Jubilee Derby." It was the first time a golden cup was presented to the winner and the first time "My Old Kentucky Home" was played before the race. Black Gold won it with a rough trip against strong competition in the last seventy yards. Ridden by J.D. Mooney, he was bumped and was forced to check, but recovered. Racing four and five wide, Black Gold overtook Chilhowee to win.

Nicknamed "The Indian Horse," Black Gold did not race in the Preakness or the Belmont Stakes after the Derby. Instead, he won two more Derbies: the Ohio State Derby, his seventh win in a row, and the Chicago Derby. He was the first horse ever to win the Derbies of four different states: Louisiana Derby, Kentucky Derby, Ohio Derby, Chicago Derby. Black Gold missed winning the July 19th Raceland Derby in Chinnville, Kentucky, running third to winner Bob Tail who had finished 19th and last in the Kentucky Derby.

The Thoroughbred Record said of Black Gold's best season: "...about as vigorous a campaign as a horse could be called upon to undergo, one that knew no let-ups and that never dodged a single issue."

== Retirement and comeback ==
Black Gold was retired to stud, but was not fertile. He sired one foal, a colt, that was killed by a lightning strike.

At the age of six, he was returned to the racetrack. He started four more times without a win. On January 18, 1928, at the age of seven, he started in the Salome Purse at the New Orleans Fair Grounds. In the stretch, he broke down and finished the race on three legs. He was euthanized at the track.

He was buried in the infield of the Fair Grounds close to the sixteenth pole, next to his mother's old rival, Pan Zareta. The Thoroughbred Record wrote that Black Gold was "...as game a horse as ever stood on plates, and answered the bugler's call."

Black Gold was elected to the National Museum of Racing and Hall of Fame in 1989.

== Career highlights ==
At 2 years old:

- 1st: Bashford Manor Stakes
- 2nd: Cincinnati Trophy
- 2nd: Tobacco Stakes
- 3rd: Breeders' Futurity

At 3 years old:

- won: Kentucky Derby
- won: Louisiana Derby
- won: Chicago Derby
- won: Ohio Derby
- won: Derby Trial
- 3rd: Latonia Derby
- 3rd: Raceland Derby

== In popular culture ==
The horse inspired a 1947 film Black Gold.
