= Ohio Derby =

- Class: Grade III
- Location: Thistledown Racecourse; North Randall, Ohio, United States
- Inaugurated: 1876
- Race type: Thoroughbred – Flat racing
- Website: www.thistledown.com

Race information
- Distance: 1 1/8 miles (9 furlongs)
- Surface: Dirt
- Track: left-handed
- Qualification: Three-year-olds
- Weight: 126 lbs
- Purse: US$500,000 (2016)

The Ohio Derby is an American Thoroughbred horse race held annually in mid-to-late June at Thistledown in North Randall, Ohio.

The Grade III stakes for three-year-olds is run on dirt over a distance of 1 1/8 miles.

The race currently offers a purse of $500,000.

Inaugurated in 1876 at Chester Park, a racetrack on Spring Grove Avenue in Cincinnati, Ohio, the race was canceled after the 1883 running. It was revived in 1924 by the Maple Heights Park racetrack with future Hall of Fame inductee and that year's Kentucky Derby winner Black Gold claiming victory. From 1928 thru 1932 the Ohio Derby was hosted by the now defunct Bainbridge Park Race Track in Bainbridge Township, Ohio, built in 1927 by John King and Homer Kline.

Pete D. Anderson, trainer of 2007 winner Delightful Kiss, won this race in 1964 as the jockey on National.

The Ohio Derby was not scheduled to be run in 2009 in order to maintain reasonable purses for area horsemen. However, an announcement was made in August that the Grade II race would run on October 3, 2009, on the Best of Ohio card. This race was downgraded from a graded stakes to a listed stakes in 2014. The race regained graded status in 2017 by The American Graded Stakes Committee of the Thoroughbred Owners and Breeders Association.

As of 2016, this race is run at 1 and 1/8th miles.

== Records ==
Speed record:

- 1:47.40 @ 1-1/8 miles: Smarten (1979)
- 1:42.80 @ 1-1/16 miles: Gushing Wind (1962)
- 2:40.00 @ 1 1/2 miles: McWhirter (1877)

Most wins by a jockey:

- 2 - Garth Patterson (1976, 1984)
- 2 - Pat Day (1980, 1995)
- 2 - Jacinto Vásquez (1982, 1990)
- 2 - Willie Martinez (1994, 2004)
- 2 - Shane Sellers (1998, 2003)
- 2 - Mike McCarthy (1999, 2000)

Most wins by a trainer:

- 2 - Edward D. Brown (1876, 1881)
- 2 - Clarence S. Buxton (1931, 1932)
- 2 - Woody Stephens (1955, 1979)
- 2 - Richard W. Small (1986, 1999)
- 2 - Thomas M. Amoss (2016, 2020)
- 2 - Brad H. Cox (2019, 2022)

Most wins by an owner:

- 2 - Jerome H. Louchheim (1931, 1932)
- 2 - Robert E. Meyerhoff (1986, 1999)

== Winners ==
Year	Winner	Jockey	Trainer	Owner	Time	Win $	Gr.
2026	Chip Honcho	Jose L. Ortiz	Steven M. Asmussen	Leland Ackerley Racing, James Sherwood, Jode Shupe and John Cilia	1:51.18	$300,000	G3
2025	Mo Plex	Joseph D. Ramos	Jeremiah C. Englehart	R and H Stable	1:50.72	$300,000	G3
2024	Batten Down	Junior Alvarado	William I. Mott	Juddmonte Farm	1:50.20	$300,000	G3
2023	Two Phil's	Gerardo Corrales	Larry Rivelli	Patricia's Hope LLC, Phillip Sagan, & Madaket Stables	1:49.60	$300,000	G3
2022	Tawny Port	Irad Ortiz Jr.	Brad H. Cox	Peachtree Stables	1:50.46	$300,000	G3
2021	Masqueparade	Miguel Mena	Albert M. Stall Jr.	FTGGG Racing (Wilbur "Bill" Babin & partners)	1:50.82	$300,000	G3
2020	Dean Martini	Ricardo Mejias	Thomas M. Amoss	Raise the Bar Racing, LLC (Annie Jessee & partners)	1:51.60	$300,000	G3
2019	Owendale	Florent Geroux	Brad H. Cox	Rupp Racing (Jim Rupp & partners)	1:50.88	$300,000	G3
2018	Core Beliefs	Joseph Talamo	Peter Eurton	Gary Broad	1:51.08	$300,000	G3
2017	Irap	Julien Leparoux	Doug O'Neill	Reddam Racing LLC	1:50.48	$300,000	G3
2016	Mo Tom	Javier Castellano	Thomas M. Amoss	GMB Racing (Gayle Benson)	1:51.82	$300,000	L/R
2015	Mr. Z	Joe Bravo	D. Wayne Lukas	Calumet Farm (Brad M. Kelley)	1:43.60	$300,000	L/R
2014	East Hall	Juan Leyva	William A. Kaplan	H. Jack Hendricks & Roger Justice	1:44.22	$180,000	L/R
2013	Title Contender	Hector L. Rosario Jr.	Wayne M. Catalano	Mary & Gary West	1:43.80	$60,000	G2
2012	Prospective	Jermaine Bridgmohan	Mark E. Casse	John C. Oxley	1:42.84	$60,000	G2
2011	Caleb's Posse	Eddie Razo Jr.	Donnie K. Von Hemel	McNeill Stables (Don C. McNeill) & Cheyenne Stables (Everett Dobson)	1:43.12	$60,000	G2
2010	Pleasant Prince	Alex Solis	Wesley A. Ward	Kenneth and Sarah Ramsey	1:43.90	$60,000	G2
2009	Gone Astray	Eddie Castro	Claude McGaughey	Phipps Stable	1:50.56	$90,000	G2
2008	Smooth Air	Manoel Cruz	Bennie Stutts Jr.	Mount Joy Stables (Brian Burns)	1:50.26	$180,000	G2
2007	Delightful Kiss	Jeffrey Sanchez	Pete D. Anderson	Hobeau Farm	1:49.36	$180,000	G2
2006	Deputy Glitters	René R. Douglas	Thomas Albertrani	Joseph LaCombe Stable	1:50.32	$210,000	G2
2005	Palladio	Richard Dos Ramos	Roger Attfield	Haras Santa Maria de Araras (Julio Bozano)	1:51.56	$210,000	G2
2004	Brass Hat	Willie Martinez	William B. Bradley	Fred F. Bradley	1:49.50	$210,000	G2
2003	Wild and Wicked	Shane Sellers	Kenny McPeek	Mr. & Mrs. R. David Randal	1:50.08	$180,000	G2
2002	Magic Weisner	Richard Migliore	Nancy Alberts	Nancy Alberts	1:49.96	$180,000	G2
2001	Western Pride	Dana Whitney	Richard Estvanko	Theresa McArthur	1:48.66	$180,000	G2
2000	Milwaukee Brew	Mike McCarthy	Tino Attard	Frank Stronach	1:50.58	$180,000	G2
1999	Stellar Brush	Mike McCarthy	Richard W. Small	Robert E. Meyerhoff	1:49.22	$180,000	G2
1998	Classic Cat	Shane Sellers	David C. Cross Jr.	David Garber	1:49.92	$180,000	G2
1997	Frisk Me Now	Edwin L. King Jr.	Robert Durso	Carol R. Dender	1:48.28	$180,000	G2
1996	Skip Away	José A. Santos	Sonny Hine	Carolyn Hine	1:47.86	$180,000	G2
1995	Petionville	Pat Day	Randy Bradshaw	Everest Stables (Jeff Nielsen)	1:48.93	$180,000	G2
1994	Exclusive Praline	Willie Martinez	Steve Towne	Frank C. Calabrese	1:48.54	$180,000	G2
1993	Forever Whirl	Abdiel Toribio	Martin D. Wolfson	Alan Reskin & Irving Ellis	1:48.93	$180,000	G2
1992	Majestic Sweep	Earlie Fires	Robert Reid Jr.	Three G. Stable	1:50.07	$180,000	G2
1991	Private Man	John R. Velazquez	John O. Hertler	Philip Dileo	1:50.20	$180,000	G2
1990	Private School	Jacinto Vásquez	Donald Habeeb	Bruce Hutson	1:51.20	$180,000	G2
1989	King Glorious	Chris McCarron	Jerry Hollendorfer	Four M Stables Inc & Halo Farms (Theodore Aroney)	1:50.40	$180,000	G2
1988	Jims Orbit	Shane Romero	Clarence E. Picou	James Cottrell	1:50.60	$150,000	G2
1987	Lost Code	Gene St. Leon	Bill Donovan	Wendover Stable (Donald Levinson)	1:50.60	$150,000	G2
1986	Broad Brush	Gary Stevens	Richard W. Small	Robert E. Meyerhoff	1:51.20	$150,000	G2
1985	Skip Trial	Jean-Luc Samyn	Hubert Hine	Zelda Cohen	1:49.00	$120,000	G2
1984	At The Threshold	Garth Patterson	Lynn S. Whiting	W. Cal Partee	1:49.30	$120,000	G2
1983	Pax Nobiscum	Robin Platts	James E. Day	Kingfield Farm	1:50.20	$90,000	G2
1982	Spanish Drums	Jacinto Vásquez	Antonio Arcodia	Anthony Drakas	1:49.60	$90,000	G2
1981	Pass The Tab	Antonio Graell	Albert S. Barrera	Leopoldo Villareal	1:49.60	$90,000	G2
1980	Stone Manor	Pat Day	James C. Bentley	Gerald Armstrong	1:52.00	$90,000	G2
1979	Smarten	Sam Maple	Woody Stephens	Ryehill Farm Stable (Jim & Eleanor Ryan)	1:47.40	$90,000	G2
1978	Special Honor	Robert Breen	Edward T. McCann	G. Alvin Haynes	1:47.80	$90,000	G2
1977	Silver Series	Larry Synder	Oscar Dishman Jr.	Archie R. Donaldson	1:49.20	$90,000	G2
1976	Return of a Native	Garth Patterson	William R. Pickett	Sundance Stable	1:49.80	$75,000	G2
1975	Brent's Prince	Ben R. Feliciano	James E. Morgan	Mary Classen	1:49.40	$66,780	G2
1974	Stonewalk	Miguel A. Rivera	Daniel J. Lopez	Timberland Stable (Lopez Sr.)	1:53.20	$63,000	G2
1973	Our Native	Anthony Rini	William Resseguet Jr.	Elizabeth Pritchard	1:50.20	$63,882	G2
1972	Freetex	James Moseley	William T. Raymond	Middletown Stables (Joseph & William Stavola)	1:50.40	$64,134	
1971	Twist The Axe	Robert Woodhouse	George T. Poole	Pastorale Stable (Barbara Vanderbilt Whitney Headley)	1:52.40	$32,256	
1970	Climber	Heliodoro Gustines	Thomas J. Kelly	Brookmeade Stable	1:50.60	$25,641	
1969	Berkley Prince	John Giovanni	J. William Boniface	Virgil Christopher & Philip S. Heisler	1:50.60	$22,450	
1968	Te Vega	Mike Manganello	George C. Berthold	Brunswick Farm (Frank C. Sullivan)	1:51.00	$19,075	
1967	Out The Window	Bobby Wall	Robert D. Goldsberry	James. R. Chapman	1:52.20	$21,000	
1966	War Censor	David Kassen	S. Bryant Ott	Fourth Estate Stable (John S. Knight)	1:52.20	$22,320	
1965	Terra Hi	Ronald J. Campbell	Robert E. Holthus	Bar O Stable	1:50.00	$21,020	
1964	National	Pete D. Anderson	Lucien Laurin	Reginald N. Webster	1:44.60	$19,435	
1963	Lemon Twist	Sidney LeJeune Jr.	Peter C. Keiser	Theodore DeLong Buhl	1:44.40	$20,572	
1962	Gushing Wind	Robert L. Baird	John O. Meaux	T. Alie Grissom	1:42.80	$15,616	
1961	Gay's Pal	Guy Smithson	Mack Crawford	H. C. Drew	1:43.60	$12,477	
1960	Playgoer	Clarence Meaux	W. Hal Bishop	W. Hal Bishop Stable	1:47.80	$11,757	
1959	On-and-On	Steve Brooks	Horace A. Jones	Calumet Farm	1:49.40	$19,730	
1958	Terra Firma	Lois C. Cook	R. Douglas Prewitt	H. Edsall Olson & R. Douglas Prewitt	1:54.20	$19,980	
1957	Manteau	Kenneth Church	Howard C. Hoffman	Louis Lee Haggin II	1:49.00	$19,840	
1956	Born Mighty	John Choquette	Sylvester E. Veitch	Cornelius V. Whitney	1:55.80	$29,041	
1955	Traffic Judge	Eddie Arcaro	Woody Stephens	Clifford H. Mooers	1:50.20	$28,938	
1954	Timely Tip	Paul A. Ward	Reid Armstrong	A. L. Birch	1:49.80	$18,703	
1953	Find	Eric Guerin	William C. Winfrey	Alfred G. Vanderbilt Jr.	1:48.00	$18,988	
1952	Carter's Pride	Stanley Bielen	Robert Brannock	M. Carter & J. Johnson	1:54.60	$3,783	
1936	1951	Race not held					
1935	Paradisical	Lee Hardy	Albert Miller	Isaac Jacob Collins	1:51.20	$4,250	
1933	1934	Race not held					
1932	Economic	Francis Horn	Clarence S. Buxton	Jerome H. Louchheim	1:51.60	$7,760	
1931	A La Carte	Frank Catrone	Clarence S. Buxton	Alton Stable (Jerome H. Louchheim)	1:58.00	$11,580	
1930	Culloden	Pete Groos	Daniel E. Stewart	Johnson N. Camden Jr.	1:51.60	$11,580	
1929	Thistle Fyrn	V. Smith	Edward Haughton	George Collins	1:51.60	$11,880	
1928	Sunfire	Roger Leonard	Thomas J. Healey	Richard T. Wilson Jr.	1:52.20	$7,320	
1927	Race not held						
1926	Boot To Boot	Albert Johnson	William A. Hurley	Idle Hour Stock Farm Stable	1:57.00	$7,320	
1925	Millwick	Kenny Noe	Kimball Patterson	Charles A. Mills	1:50.80	$7,320	
1924	Black Gold	J. D. Mooney	Hanley Webb	Rosa M. Hoots	1:57.40	$4,000	
1884	1923	Race not held					
1883	Pilot	Watkins	J. Nicholas Ackerman	J. Nicholas Ackerman	2:55.00	$1,100	
1882	Babcock	Kelso	William Lakeland	William Lakeland	2:45.00	$950	
1881	Bootjack	Allen	Edward D. Brown	Milton Young	2:41.00	$550	
1880	Mary Anderson			Caldwell & Co	2:52.00	$600	
1879	Ben Hill	Charles Shauer		Lloyd & Co.	2:54.00	$750	
1878	Harper	McLellan		Beatty & McClellan	2:40.50	$1,025	
1877	McWhirter	Mr. James	Abraham Perry	Abe Buford	2:40.00	$975	
1876	Bombay	Billy Walker	Edward D. Brown	Daniel Swigert	2:46.00	$1,000	
