= National Register of Historic Places listings in Lawrence County, Kentucky =

Location of Lawrence County in Kentucky

This is a list of the National Register of Historic Places listings in Lawrence County, Kentucky.

This is intended to be a complete list of the properties and districts on the National Register of Historic Places in Lawrence County, Kentucky, United States. The locations of National Register properties and districts for which the latitude and longitude coordinates are included below, may be seen in a map.

There are 10 properties and districts listed on the National Register in the county. Another property was once listed but has been removed.

This National Park Service list is complete through NPS recent listings posted December 12, 2025.

== Current listings ==
	Name on the Register	Image	Date listed	Location	City or town	Description
1	Atkins-Carter House	Atkins-Carter House	November 1, 1988 (#88002044)	314 E. Madison St. 38°06′54″N 82°36′06″W	Louisa	
2	Big Sandy Milling Company	Big Sandy Milling Company	November 1, 1988 (#88002045)	Pike St. between Lock Ave. and railroad tracks 38°07′00″N 82°36′20″W	Louisa	Three-story post-and-beam mill building
3	First United Methodist Church	First United Methodist Church	November 15, 1984 (#84000391)	204 W. Main St. 38°06′52″N 82°36′19″W	Louisa	
4	Capt. Freese House	Capt. Freese House	November 1, 1988 (#88002042)	Sycamore St. facing the Big Sandy River; 38°07′13″N 82°36′24″W	Louisa	
5	Garred House, Chapel, and Burial Vault	Garred House, Chapel, and Burial Vault	October 29, 1975 (#75000790)	9 miles south of Louisa on U.S. Route 23; 38°00′51″N 82°39′34″W	Louisa	
6	Louisa Commercial Historic District	Louisa Commercial Historic District	November 1, 1988 (#88002041)	E. Main and Main Cross Sts. 38°06′59″N 82°36′11″W	Louisa	
7	Louisa Residential Historic District	Louisa Residential Historic District	November 1, 1988 (#88002040)	Roughly bounded by Perry, Lock, Madison, and S. Lady Washington Sts. 38°06′54″N 82°36′18″W	Louisa	
8	Louisa United Methodist Church	Louisa United Methodist Church	November 1, 1988 (#88002043)	Main Cross and Madison Sts. 38°06′55″N 82°36′08″W	Louisa	
9	Fred M. Vinson Birthplace	Fred M. Vinson Birthplace	September 4, 1974 (#74000890)	E. Madison and Vinson Ave. 38°06′55″N 82°36′07″W	Louisa	
10	Yatesville Covered Bridge		March 26, 1976 (#76000910)	South of Fallsburg over Blaine Creek off Kentucky Route 3; 38°08′41″N 82°41′05″W	Fallsburg	

== Former listing ==
	Name on the Register	Image	Date listed	Date removed	Location	City or town	Description
1	East Fork Covered Bridge		March 26, 1976 (#76000909)	April 9, 1982	Northwest of Fallsburg over East Fork of Little Sandy River off Kentucky Route 3; 38°13′02″N 82°44′07″W	Fallsburg	Kingpost truss bridge which was demolished in 1980.

== See also ==
- List of National Historic Landmarks in Kentucky
- National Register of Historic Places listings in Kentucky
