= Kentucky Route 645 =

State highway in Kentucky, United States

Kentucky Route 645
- KY 645 highlighted in red

Route information
- Maintained by KYTC
- Length: 14.692 mi (23.644 km)
- Existed: 1984–present

Major junctions
- West end: US 23 near Ulysses
- East end: Dead end near Inez

Location
- Country: United States
- State: Kentucky
- Counties: Lawrence, Martin

Highway system
- Kentucky State Highway System; Interstate; US; State; Parkways
← KY 644	→ KY 646

Kentucky Route 645 (KY 645) is a 14.692-mile-long (23.644 km) state highway in eastern Kentucky that runs from U.S. Route 23 (US 23) northeast of Ulysses to, temporarily, a dead end east of KY 40 southeast of Inez.

== History ==
KY 645 was designated on March 22, 1984.

The original KY 645 ran from US 460 in Sideview west via Chiles Highway to Donaldson Road. The road was given to Montgomery County by September 26, 1980.

== Future ==
An extension of the highway is planned east of KY 40 to Warfield. While previous information indicated the KY 40 designation for the new highway, the mileage for KY 645 continues past KY 40.

== Major intersections ==
County	Location	mi	km	Destinations	Notes
Lawrence		0.000	0.000	US 23 – Louisa, Paintsville	Western terminus
Lawrence		1.595	2.567	KY 581	
Lawrence		2.588	4.165	KY 1690	
Martin		6.222	10.013	KY 1884	
Martin		7.718	12.421	KY 3411 south	Northern terminus of KY 3411
Martin		9.887	15.912	KY 40 – Inez, Tomahawk	
Martin		11.310	18.202	KY 3 north (Middle Fork Road) / KY 3412 west (Saltwell Road)	West end of KY 3 overlap; eastern terminus of KY 3412
Martin		11.620	18.701	KY 3 south	East end of KY 3 overlap; partial interchange
Martin		12.7– 13.177	20.4– 21.206	KY 40 / KY 908 north (Blacklog Road) KY 908 south (Coldwater Road)	No direct access from KY 645 west to KY 908 south or from KY 908 north to KY 645 west
Martin		14.692	23.644	Dead end	Temporary eastern terminus
1.000 mi = 1.609 km; 1.000 km = 0.621 mi: Concurrency terminus; Incomplete access; Unopened
