= Kentucky Route 644 =

State highway in Kentucky, United States

Kentucky Route 644
- KY 644 highlighted in red

Route information
- Maintained by KYTC
- Length: 2.821 mi (4.540 km)

Major junctions
- West end: KY 2565 near Louisa
- East end: KY 3 near Louisa

Location
- Country: United States
- State: Kentucky
- Counties: Lawrence

Highway system
- Kentucky State Highway System; Interstate; US; State; Parkways
← KY 643	→ KY 645

Kentucky Route 644 (KY 644) is a 2.821-mile-long (4.540 km) state highway in Lawrence County, Kentucky, that runs from KY 2565 to KY 2 south of Louisa.

== Major intersections ==
The entire route is in Lawrence County.

Location	mi	km	Destinations	Notes
	0.000	0.000	KY 2565	Western terminus
	1.781	2.866	KY 1690 south	Northern terminus of KY 1690
	2.821	4.540	KY 3	Eastern terminus
1.000 mi = 1.609 km; 1.000 km = 0.621 mi
