= Kentucky Route 321 =

State highway in Kentucky, United States

Kentucky Route 321
- KY 321 highlighted in red

Route information
- Maintained by KYTC
- Length: 16.238 mi (26.133 km)

Major junctions
- South end: KY 1428 at Prestonsburg
- North end: US 23 near Paintsville

Location
- Country: United States
- State: Kentucky
- Counties: Floyd, Johnson

Highway system
- Kentucky State Highway System; Interstate; US; State; Parkways
← KY 320	→ KY 322

Kentucky Route 321 (KY 321) originates at a junction with U.S. Highway 23 north of Paintsville, Kentucky in Johnson County, Kentucky, United States. The route continues through Johnson County to terminate at KY 1428 in Prestonsburg in Floyd County.

== Route description ==
=== Floyd County ===
KY 321 begins at an intersection with KY 1428 in Prestonburg, Floyd County, heading north on North Lake Drive, a three-lane road with a center left-turn lane. The road passes businesses with some nearby woodland and homes. The route passes to the east of Prestonburg Community College and narrows to a two-lane unnamed road, curving northeast through woods and running to the east of Levisa Fork. KY 321 passes more rural development and intersects the western terminus of KY 3024. The road turns to the north and winds through forested areas with occasional residential development. The route curves to the northwest and comes to an intersection with KY 3. At this point, KY 321 turns east to form a concurrency with KY 3, passing through more rural areas with some development including Highlands Regional Medical Center. The road forms a short concurrency with KY 3051 before it curves to the north. KY 3 splits by heading to the east near Auxier. KY 321 continues northwest through forests and crosses into Johnson County.

=== Johnson County ===
In Johnson County, the road intersects the southern terminus of KY 2381 before it passes to the northeast of Paintsville-Prestonsburg Combs Field, where it intersects KY 2559. The route heads north into residential areas and curves to the northeast. KY 321 continues north into dense forests, where it makes a turn to the west. The road heads northwest and intersects the southern terminus of KY 1107 before it crosses Levisa Fork and a CSX railroad line. The route curves north and gains a second northbound lane as it passes through wooded areas of development. KY 321 narrows back to two lanes and turns northwest to come to a grade-separated junction with KY 1428. The road runs through more forested areas and curves to the north, where it gains a second northbound lane. The route heads northeast, where the northbound direction narrows back to one lane and the southbound direction becomes two lanes. KY 321 turns to the north before it heads northwest into Paintsville. At this point, the road becomes four lanes total and passes businesses. The route curves to the west and narrows to two lanes, intersecting the southern terminus of KY 321 Bus. KY 321 heads into wooded areas and curves to the north, coming to a junction with the western terminus of KY 2378. The road continues past commercial development and heads northwest, gaining a center left-turn lane and passing several shopping centers. The route crosses Paint Creek and intersects KY 40. KY 321 continues north as a four-lane divided highway through wooded areas with some development and comes to its northern terminus at US 23.

== History ==
KY 321 was designated on April 22, 1993, when US 23 was rerouted off of this road.

The original KY 321 ran from KY 90 east of Burkeville north to Creelsboro; this became part of KY 379 when it was extended south.

Another KY 321 was formed in 1952 from US 127 in Nevin west via Nevins Station Road; this was decommissioned by 1967.

Yet another KY 321 was designated from US 68 in Bowling Green via Avenue of Champions, College Heights Boulevard, State, and College Street to US 31W when US 68 was rerouted off of this road. This was decommissioned on February 9, 1983.

== Major intersections ==
County	Location	mi	km	Destinations	Notes
Floyd	Prestonburg	0.000	0.000	KY 1428 (University Drive/North Lake Drive)	
Floyd		1.444	2.324	KY 3024 east	
Floyd	Auxier	4.182	6.730	KY 3 south (Bays Branch Road)	South end of KY 3 overlap
Floyd	Auxier	5.196	8.362	KY 3051 west (John C.C. Mayo Avenue)	South end of KY 3051 overlap
Floyd	Auxier	5.299	8.528	KY 3051 east	North end of KY 3051 overlap
Floyd	Auxier	5.794	9.325	KY 3 north	North end of KY 3 overlap
Johnson		6.712	10.802	KY 2381 north (Johns Creek Road)	
Johnson		7.396	11.903	KY 2559	
Johnson		10.121	16.288	KY 1107 north	
Johnson				To KY 1428	
Johnson	Paintsville	13.737	22.108	KY 321 Bus. north	
Johnson	Paintsville	14.391	23.160	KY 2378 east (James S. Trimble Boulevard)	
Johnson	Paintsville	15.467	24.892	KY 40	
Johnson	Paintsville	16.238	26.133	US 23	
1.000 mi = 1.609 km; 1.000 km = 0.621 mi

== KY 321 Business ==
Kentucky Route 321 Business
- Location: Paintsville
- Length: 0.333 mi (536 m)

Kentucky Route 321 Business (KY 321 Bus.) is a business route of KY 321 in Paintsville. The route begins at KY 321 by heading north as a two-lane undivided road. KY 321 Bus. immediately intersects the western terminus of KY 2333 and becomes Broadway. The road passes by businesses and crosses Paint Creek, where the name changes to College Street. The business route heads through the downtown area and intersects the western terminus of KY 2561 before it comes to its northern terminus at KY 40.
