= Vinson House =

Vinson House may refer to:

in the United States (by state)

- Vinson House (Little Rock, Arkansas), listed on the National Register of Historic Places (NRHP)
- Vinson House (Rogers, Arkansas), NRHP-listed
- Paul L. Vinson House, Sebring, Florida, NRHP-listed
- Fred M. Vinson Birthplace, Louisa, Kentucky, NRHP-listed in Lawrence County
- Vinson House (Newport, Tennessee), NRHP-listed in Cocke County
