= Yatesville =

Yatesville can refer to these places in the United States:

- Yatesville, Georgia
- Yatesville, Ohio, an unincorporated community
- Yatesville, Pennsylvania
- Yatesville Dam, Kentucky
- Yatesville Lake State Park in Kentucky, created by Yatesville Dam
