= Kentucky Route 3 =

State highway in Kentucky

Kentucky Route 3
- KY 3 highlighted in red

Route information
- Maintained by KYTC
- Length: 79.158 mi (127.392 km)

Major junctions
- South end: US 23 / US 460 near Auxier
- US 23 near Louisa
- North end: US 23 near Catlettsburg

Location
- Country: United States
- State: Kentucky
- Counties: Floyd, Johnson, Martin, Lawrence, Boyd

Highway system
- Kentucky State Highway System; Interstate; US; State; Parkways
← KY 2	→ KY 4

Kentucky Route 3 (KY 3) is a 79.158-mile-long (127.392 km) state highway in the U.S. state of Kentucky.

== Route description ==
Kentucky Route 3 originates at a junction with U.S. Highway 23 west of Prestonsburg in Floyd County, Kentucky, United States. The route continues through Johnson, Martin and Lawrence counties to terminate at another junction with U.S. Highway 23 south of Catlettsburg in Boyd County.

From South Catlettsburg to Louisa it follows the original routing of U.S. 23. It intersects KY-180, which parallels I-64, after 6.4 miles (10.3 km). At this intersection, you turn right to stay on KY-3. The road continues 8 miles (13 km) to the Lawrence County line. In Lawrence County, it passes KY-1 and KY-1185, which takes you to Yatesville Lake. It then continues into downtown Louisa toward Inez and on to Prestonsburg.

== Major intersections ==
County	Location	mi	km	Destinations	Notes
Floyd		0.00	0.00	US 23 / US 460 – Pikeville, Prestonsburg, Paintsville, Jenny Wiley State Resort Park	Southern terminus
Floyd		0.051	0.082	KY 1100	
Floyd		1.060	1.706	KY 321 south	Southern end of KY 321 overlap
Floyd		2.074	3.338	KY 3051 west – Auxier	Southern end of KY 3051 overlap
Floyd		2.177	3.504	KY 3051 east – Jenny Wiley State Park	Northern end of KY 3051 overlap
Floyd		2.672	4.300	KY 321 north – Paintsville	Northern end of KY 321 overlap
Johnson		4.703	7.569	KY 302 (via KY 3507)	Interchange
Martin		18.921	30.450	KY 645 east – Kermit, WV	Southern end of KY 645 overlap; interchange
Martin		19.231	30.949	KY 645 west / KY 3412 west (Saltwell Road) – Louisa	Northern end of KY 645 overlap
Martin	Inez	20.457	32.922	KY 40 east (East Main Street) – Kermit	Southern end of KY 40 overlap
Martin	Inez	20.617	33.180	KY 40 west – Paintsville, Louisa	Northern end of KY 40 overlap
Martin		23.377	37.622	KY 3411 (Fitch Branch Road)	Southern terminus of KY 3411
Martin	Add	24.639	39.653	KY 1884 south (Milo Road)	north terminus of KY 1884
Martin		30.177	48.565	KY 292 south (Buffalo Horn Road)	north terminus of KY 292
Lawrence		43.028	69.247	KY 644 west	Eastern terminus of KY 644
Lawrence		45.387	73.043	Fort Gay (KY 3S)	
Lawrence	Louisa	45.547	73.301	KY 2566 north	south terminus of KY 2566
Lawrence	Louisa	45.800	73.708	KY 2565 south (Pocahontas Street)	Northern terminus of KY 2565
Lawrence	Louisa	45.967	73.977	KY 32 west – Paintsville	Eastern terminus of KY 32
Lawrence	Louisa	46.686	75.134	KY 2566 south	north terminus of KY 2566
Lawrence		47.501	76.445	US 23 – Paintsville, Ashland, Yatesville Lake State Park Campground	
Lawrence	Five Forks	49.232	79.231	KY 3396 south (Five Forks Road)	north terminus of KY 3396
Lawrence		50.074	80.586	KY 1185 south – Yatesville Lake State Park Marina	Northern terminus of KY 1185
Lawrence	Fallsburg	53.446	86.013	KY 3398 east (Fallsburg Road)	Western terminus of KY 3398
Lawrence		54.964	88.456	KY 707 north	Southern terminus of KY 707
Lawrence		56.775	91.371	KY 1 north – Webbville	Southern terminus of KY 1
Lawrence		60.125	96.762	KY 1496 west	Eastern terminus of KY 1496
Lawrence		62.427	100.467	KY 3399 south	Northern terminus of KY 3399
Boyd	Boltsfork	65.008	104.620	KY 773 (Bolts Fork)	Northern terminus of KY 773
Boyd	Alley	67.987	109.414	KY 854 (Davis Branch)	Southern end of KY 854 overlap
Boyd		68.261	109.855	KY 854	Northern end of KY 854 overlap
Boyd		69.736	112.229	KY 966 (Trace Road)	Eastern terminus of KY 966
Boyd	Mavity	71.834	115.606	KY 1937	Northern terminus of KY 1937
Boyd		72.728	117.044	KY 180 west	east terminus of KY 180
Boyd		79.158	127.392	US 23 to I-64	Northern terminus
1.000 mi = 1.609 km; 1.000 km = 0.621 mi: Concurrency terminus

== KY 3 Spur ==
Kentucky Route 3 Spur
- Location: Louisa
- Length: 0.053 mi (85 m)

Kentucky Route 3 Spur (KY 3 Spur) is a short 0.053-mile (85 m) spur of KY 3 in Louisa running northeast to the West Virginia border at the Tug Fork of the Big Sandy River, where it continues into that state as West Virginia Route 37.
