= Auxier =

Auxier may refer to:

- Auxier, Kentucky
- Randall Auxier (b. 1961), American academic
- Daniel Phillip Auxier
- Tiara Auxier, American politician
