= List of primary state highways in Kentucky =

- Highway markers for primary state routes

Highway names
- Interstates: Interstate nn (I-nn)
- US Highways: U.S. Highway nn (US nn)
- State: Kentucky Route nn (KY nn)

System links
- Kentucky State Highway System; Interstate; US; State; Parkways

State highways in Kentucky are maintained by the Kentucky Transportation Cabinet, which classifies routes as either primary or secondary. Some routes, such as Kentucky Route 80, are both primary and secondary, with only a segment of the route listed as part of the primary system. Despite the name, there is no difference in signage between primary and secondary routes.

All of the Interstates and parkways are also primary, but only parts of the U.S. Highways in Kentucky are (though every mainline U.S. Highway is at least partially primary).

Due to the large size of the state highway system, only segments of routes that are part of the primary system are listed below.

== Primary state highways ==
=== 1-999 ===
Number	Length (mi)	Length (km)	Southern or western terminus	Northern or eastern terminus	Formed	Removed	Notes
KY 3	79.158	127.392	US 23 / US 460 near Auxier	KY 645 near Inez	c. 1929	current	
KY 4	19.283	31.033	Beltway around Lexington		1966	current	
KY 7	203.073	326.814	US 460 in West Liberty	KY 9 near Grayson	c. 1929	current	
KY 8	114.202	183.790	KY 237 in Ludlow	US 23 / in South Portsmouth	—	—	Gap In Route from Maysville to Concord
KY 9	116.285	187.143	KY 1 near Grayson	KY 8 in Newport	c. 1929	current	
KY 10	117.760	189.516	KY 9 near Vanceburg	SR 253 near Greenup	c. 1929	current	
KY 11	182.546	293.779	KY 30 near Levi	Mountain Parkway at Slade	c. 1929	current	
KY 11	182.546	293.779	US 460 near Mount Sterling	US 62 / US 68 Bus. in Maysville	c. 1929	current	
KY 15	131.418	211.497	US 119 in Whitesburg	U.S. Route 60 in Winchester	—	—	
KY 16	36.752	59.147	I-275 in Taylor Mill	KY 17 in Covington	—	—	
KY 17	34.660	55.780	KY 16 at Nicholson	Cincinnati, OH	—	—	
KY 18	16.632	26.767	KY 338 at Burlington	KY 1017 in Florence	—	—	
KY 21	17.284	27.816	KY 954 near Berea	US 421 at Bighill	—	—	
KY 22	4.827	7.768	US 42 in Louisville	KY 1694 in Louisville	—	—	
KY 22	28.315	45.569	US 127 in Owenton	I-75 in Dry Ridge	—	—	
KY 30	102.023	164.190	Hal Rogers Parkway in London	KY 11 near Levi	—	—	
KY 32	26.117	42.031	KY 11 in Flemingsburg	US 60 in Morehead	—	—	
KY 34	6.904	11.111	US 150 in Danville	US 27 near Bryantsville	—	—	
KY 35	6.217	10.005	US 127 at Bromley	I-71 near Sparta	—	—	
KY 40	11.095	17.856	KY 645 near Inez	Kermit, WV	—	—	
KY 52	167.399	269.403	US 62 in Boston	KY 30 in Jackson	—	—	
KY 53	66.314	106.722	KY 555 near Willisburg	US 42 / US 42 near La Grange	—	—	
KY 54	54.328	87.432	KY 81 / KY 2831 in Owensboro	KY 1456 at Dermont	—	—	
KY 55	41.522	66.823	KY 55 Bus. south of Columbia	KY 555 in Springfield	—	—	Primary route follows KY 2154 around Lebanon rather than KY 55
KY 55	18.626	29.976	I-64 near Shelbyville	US 421 near New Castle	—	—	
KY 61	151.235	243.389	SR 53 near Peytonsburg	US 31E / US 60 in Downtown Louisville	—	—	
KY 65	—	—	—	—	1929	1960	Renumbered to KY 259 to avoid duplication with I-65
KY 67	14.219	22.883	I-64 near Grayson	KY 3105 in Wurtland	—	—	
KY 69	2.597	4.179	US 60 in Hawesville	SR 237 in Cannelton, IN	—	—	
KY 70	294.692	474.261	I-65 near Cave City	KY 90 near Cave City	—	—	
KY 80	147.447	237.293	KY 303 in Mayfield	US 31W in Bowling Green	—	—	
KY 80	29.196	46.986	KY 914 near Somerset	Hal Rogers Parkway in London	—	—	
KY 80	0.1	0.16	Hal Rogers Parkway in Manchester	US 421 in Manchester	—	—	
KY 80	42.477	68.360	Hal Rogers Parkway / KY 15 in Hazard	US 23 at Watergap	—	—	
KY 81	2.602	4.188	US 60 in Owensboro	KY 54 / KY 2831 in Owensboro	—	—	
KY 90	134.734	216.833	KY 70 near Cave City	US 25W near Goldbug	—	—	
KY 101	5.97	9.61	US 31W near Smiths Grove	KY 259 at Rhoda	—	—	
KY 114	17.543	28.233	US 460 near Salyersville	KY 1428 in Prestonsburg	—	—	
KY 118	3.524	5.671	US 421 in Hyden	Hal Rogers Parkway near Hyden	—	—	
KY 121	3.439	5.535	KY 80 near Mayfield	US 45 in Mayfield	—	—	
KY 144	7.043	11.335	KY 448 near Garrett	KY 1600 at Flaherty	—	—	
KY 151	6.686	10.760	US 127 near Lawrenceburg	I-64 near Graefenburg	—	—	
KY 155	12.284	19.769	KY 148 near Fisherville	US 31E / US 150 in Louisville	—	—	
KY 160	—	—	SR 160 near Appalachia, VA	US 119 in Cumberland	—	—	
KY 160	—	—	KY 15 near Carr Creek	KY 80 near Hindman	—	—	
KY 180	1.777	2.860	I-64 near Cannonsburg	US 60 near Cannonsburg	—	—	
KY 191	15.9	25.6	KY 15 in Campton	KY 205 near Helechawa	—	—	
KY 192	3.9	6.3	I-75 in London	Hal Rogers Parkway in London	—	—	
KY 205	21.7	34.9	KY 15 at Vancleve	US 460 near Grassy Creek	—	—	
KY 210	—	—	KY 1618 near Hodgenville	US 68 / KY 55 in Campbellsville	—	—	
KY 234	0.374	0.602	I-65 near Bowling Green	KY 880 near Bowling Green	—	—	
KY 237	9.629	15.496	US 42 at Sugartit	KY 2846 near Hebron	—	—	
KY 245	19.439	31.284	US 150 near Bardstown	KY 61 near Bardstown Junction	—	—	
KY 259	55.397	89.153	KY 101 at Rhoda	US 60 at Harned	—	—	
KY 312	1.685	2.712	US 25W in Corbin	US 25E in Corbin	—	—	
KY 313	22.596	36.365	I-65 near Lebanon Junction	US 60 / KY 144 near Garrett	—	—	
KY 338	0.360	0.579	US 25 at Richwood	I-75 at Richwood	—	—	
KY 348	0.832	1.339	I-69 in Benton	US 641 in Benton	—	—	
KY 418	2.489	4.006	US 25 in Lexington	I-75 in Lexington	—	—	
KY 425	4.747	7.640	US 60 near Henderson	Pennyrile Parkway near Henderson	—	—	
KY 446	0.970	1.561	US 31W in Bowling Green	I-65 in Bowling Green	—	—	
KY 448	3.056	4.918	KY 313 in Brandenburg	KY 79 / KY 313 in Brandenburg	—	—	
KY 461	18.015	28.992	KY 80 near Shopville	US 25 in Mount Vernon	—	—	
KY 471	0.698	1.123	US 27 in Highland Heights	I-275 / I-471 in Highland Heights	—	—	
KY 519	20.544	33.062	KY 7 near West Liberty	US 60 in Morehead	—	—	
KY 536	3.278	5.275	US 42 in Union	US 25 at Devon	—	—	
KY 555	14.639	23.559	KY 55 in Springfield	Bluegrass Parkway near Willisburg	—	—	
KY 620	2.837	4.566	US 62 near Georgetown	I-75 near Georgetown	—	—	
KY 627	12.457	20.048	US 25 near Richmond	I-64 in Winchester	—	—	
KY 645	9.887	15.912	US 23 near Ulysses	KY 40 in Inez	1984	current	
KY 676	5.287	8.509	US 127 in Frankfort	US 60 / US 421 in Frankfort	—	—	
KY 686	3.506	5.642	US 460 / KY 11 in Mount Sterling	US 460 near Mount Sterling	—	—	
KY 788	1.111	1.788	Fort Campbell	US 41 Alt. in Oak Grove	2012	current	
KY 823	4.6	7.4	KY-477 in Raymond	KY-261/KY-703 west of Fackler Road	—	—	
KY 841	38.9	62.6	US 31W / US 60 / KY 1934 near Valley Station	Indiana State Road 265 (Future I-265) on the Lewis and Clark Bridge (Ohio River)	—	—	
KY 864	10.774	17.339	I-265 in Louisville	US 60 Alt. in Louisville	—	—	
KY 876	2.81	4.52	I-75 in Richmond	US 25 / US 421 in Richmond	—	—	
KY 880	2.834	4.561	US 231 in Bowling Green	KY 234 near Bowling Green	1983	current	
KY 913	4.337	6.980	KY 155 near Jeffersontown	US 60 near Middletown	—	—	
KY 914	13.301	21.406	Cumberland Parkway west of Somerset	KY 80 east of Somerset	—	—	
KY 922	4.308	6.933	US 60 in Lexington	I-64 / I-75 in Lexington	—	—	

=== 1000-1999 ===
Number	Length (mi)	Length (km)	Southern or western terminus	Northern or eastern terminus	Formed	Removed	Notes
KY 1020	9.713	15.632	KY 841 near Fairdale	US 31E / US 31W / US 60 in Louisville	—	—	
KY 1051	2.085	3.355	KY 79 in Brandenburg	KY 448 in Brandenburg	—	—	
KY 1065	5.141	8.274	KY 1020 near Fairdale	KY 2052 near Okolona	—	—	
KY 1120	—	—	I-75 in Covington	I-471 in Newport	—	—	
KY 1247	3.950	6.357	US 27 in Burnside	KY 914 near Somerset	—	—	
KY 1447	9.242	14.874	KY 1932 near Louisville	KY 146 near Pewee Valley	—	—	
KY 1526	2.09	3.36	KY 1020 at Brooks	KY 61 in Pioneer Village	—	—	
KY 1600	—	—	KY 3005 near Elizabethtown	KY 144 at Flaherty	—	—	
KY 1618	1.063	1.711	US 31E near Hodgenville	KY 210 near Hodgenville	—	—	
KY 1638	9.097	14.640	KY 448 near Brandenburg	US 31W / US 60 at Muldraugh	—	—	
KY 1703	4.765	7.669	KY 2052 near Fern Creek	US 60 Alt. in Louisville	—	—	
KY 1747	18.242	29.358	I-65 near Okolona	KY 22 near Anchorage	—	—	
KY 1865	6.193	9.967	KY 841 near Fairdale	US 60 Alt. in Louisville	—	—	
KY 1932	6.590	10.606	US 31E near Fern Creek	US 42 near Louisville	—	—	
KY 1934	11.502	18.511	US 31W / KY 841 near Valley Station	I-264 near Shively	—	—	
KY 1958	5.325	8.570	partial loop around Winchester		—	—	
KY 1973	33.886	54.534	I-75 in Lexington	US 25 in Lexington	—	—	
KY 1974	9.455	15.216	KY 1980 in Lexington	KY 4 in Lexington	—	—	
Former

=== 2000-2999 ===
Number	Length (mi)	Length (km)	Southern or western terminus	Northern or eastern terminus	Formed	Removed	Notes
KY 2054	3.299	5.309	US 31W in Louisville	US 60 Alt. in Louisville	—	—	
KY 2154	6.821	10.977	US 68 east of Lebanon	US 68 / KY 55 west of Lebanon	—	—	
KY 2155	3.447	5.547	US 60 / US 231 near Owensboro	KY 54 in Owensboro	—	—	
KY 2262	1.494	2.404	KY 54 in Owensboro	SR 161 near Rockport, IN	—	—	
KY 2831	3.056	4.918	US 60 / US 431 near Owensboro	KY 54 / KY 81 in Owensboro	—	—	

=== 3000-5999 ===
Number	Length (mi)	Length (km)	Southern or western terminus	Northern or eastern terminus	Formed	Removed	Notes
KY 3005	10.582	17.030	Western Kentucky Parkway near Elizabethtown	US 62 in Elizabethtown	—	—	
KY 3041	5.700	9.173	US 25W near Corbin	US 25E near Corbin	—	—	
KY 3155	4.697	7.559	KY 259 south of Leitchfield	KY 259 north of Leitchfield	—	—	
KY 3487	1.277	2.055	US 62 near Georgetown	KY 620 near Georgetown	—	2021	
Former
