= Overda, Kentucky =

Unincorporated community in Kentucky, United States

- Unincorporated community
- Location in Kentucky Location in the United States
- Coordinates: 38°7′11″N 82°48′1″W
- Country: United States
- State: Kentucky
- County: Lawrence
- Elevation: 925 ft (282 m)
- Time zone: UTC-5 (Eastern (EST))
  - Summer (DST): UTC-4 (EDT)
- GNIS feature ID: 508767

Overda is an unincorporated community located in Lawrence County, Kentucky, United States. Its post office is closed.
