= Highlands ARH Regional Medical Center =

Coordinates: 37.72898°N 82.7673°W

- Appalachian Regional Healthcare
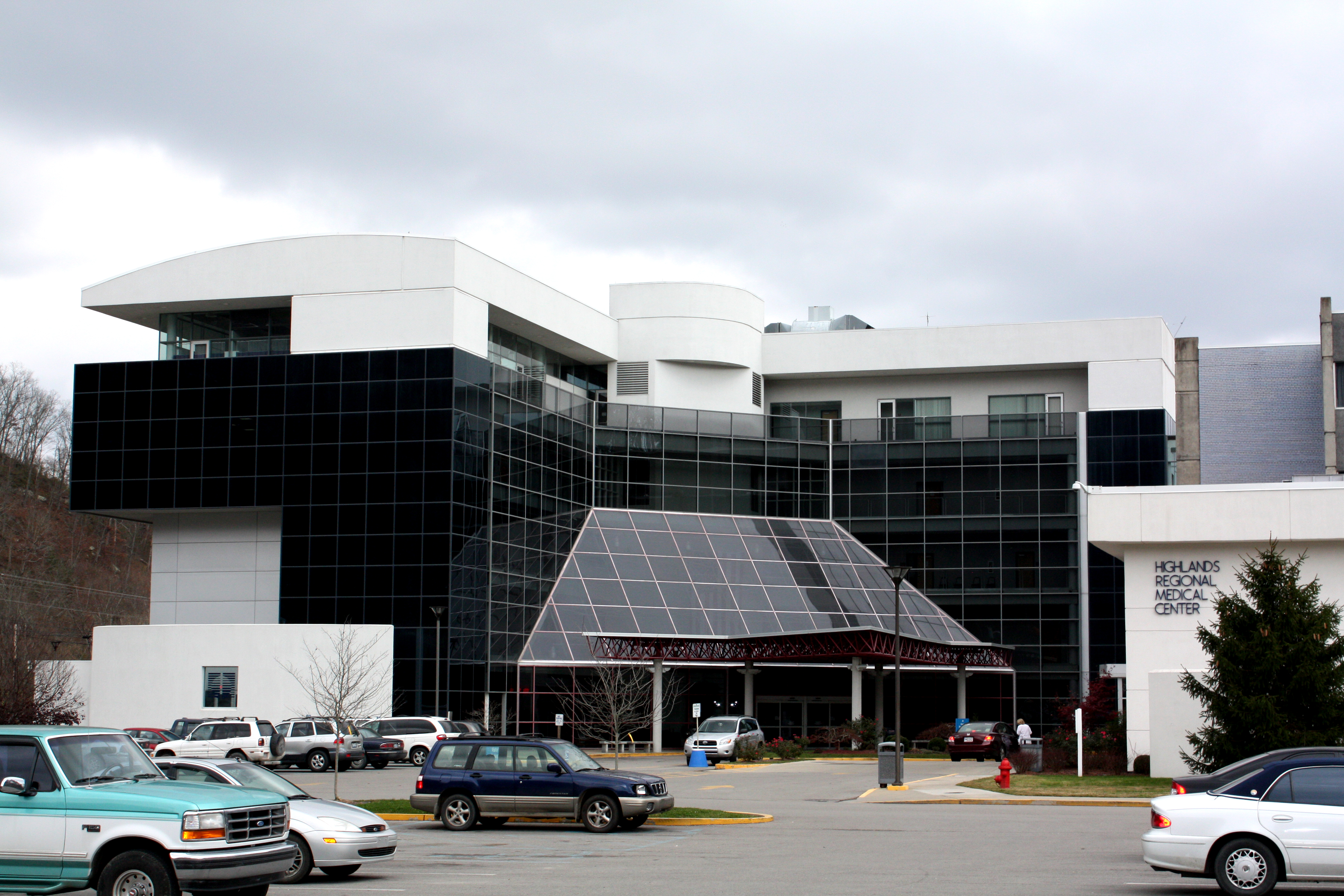
- HRMC from the parking lot, Nov. 09

Geography
- Location: 5000 Ky. Rt. 321, Prestonsburg, Eastern Kentucky Coalfield, Kentucky, United States

Organization
- Care system: Nonprofit
- Type: General
- Affiliated university: none

Services
- Beds: 184

Links
- Website: Official Website
- Lists: Hospitals in Kentucky

Highlands ARH Regional Medical Center is a hospital in Prestonsburg, Kentucky. A 184-bed, nonprofit healthcare facility operated by Appalachian Regional Healthcare. it serves the counties of Floyd, Johnson, Martin, and Magoffin, a combined population of over 90,000.

== Location ==
HRMC is at the intersection of State Routes 3 and 321. It is 1.3 miles (2.1 km) from Prestonsburg, 13 miles (21 km) from Paintsville, 22 miles (35 km) from Salyersville, 23 miles (37 km) from Inez, 27 miles (43 km) from Pikeville, and 70 miles (110 km) from Ashland.

== Medical services ==
Among the medical fields practiced at HRMC are family practice, cardiology, obstetrics/gynecology, pediatrics, internal medicine, orthopedics, urology and otolaryngology. Highlands Regional is also accredited through the Joint Commission on Accreditation of Health Care Organizations (JCAHO).

HRMC is also home to Highlands Clinic, a specialty care clinic offering 25 areas of specialty medicine. These specialty clinics are staffed by physicians from the University of Kentucky and other medical specialists from around the commonwealth who travel to the clinic on a weekly or biweekly basis to provide consultant or follow-up care in multiple areas. These include neurosurgery, oncology, cardio-thoracic, and high-risk prenatal care, among others. The purpose of these specialty clinics is to eliminate the need for patients to travel 120 miles (190 km) to Lexington to see a specialist. These clinics are bilocated, with one on site at the HRMC main campus, and the other located in Paintsville.
