= Zelda, Kentucky =

Unincorporated community in Kentucky, United States

- Unincorporated community
- Location within Kentucky Location within the United States
- Coordinates: 38°11′42″N 82°36′17″W
- Country: United States
- State: Kentucky
- County: Lawrence
- Elevation: 561 ft (171 m)
- Time zone: UTC-5 (Eastern (EST))
  - Summer (DST): UTC-4 (EDT)
- Area code: 606
- GNIS feature ID: 509426

Zelda is an unincorporated community in Lawrence County, Kentucky, United States.
