= Louisa United Methodist Church =

Historic church in Kentucky, United States

- U.S. National Register of Historic Places
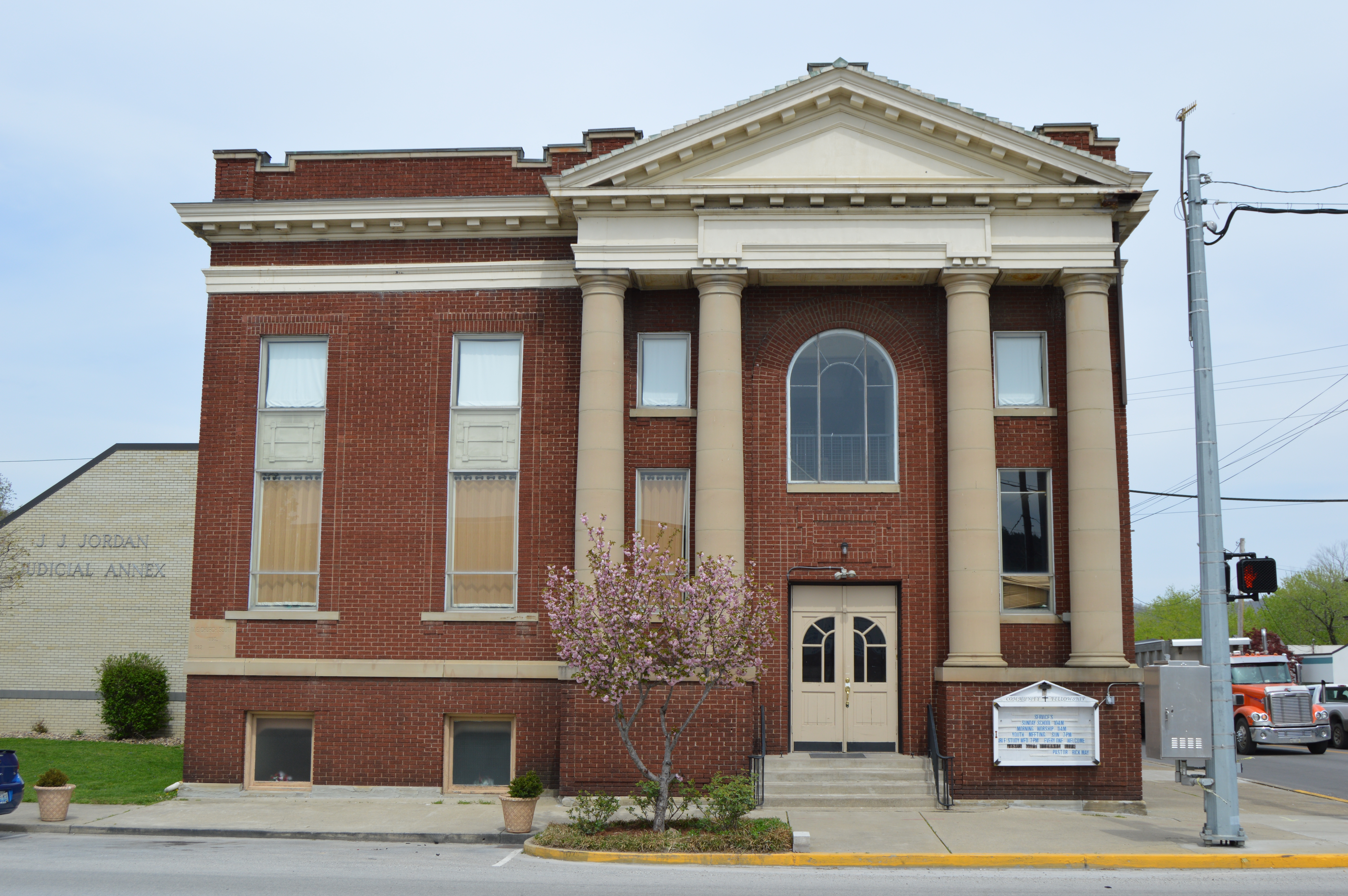
- Front of the church

- Location within Kentucky Location within the United States
- Location: Main Cross and Madison Sts., Louisa, Kentucky
- Coordinates: 38°6′55″N 82°36′8″W
- Area: 1 acre (0.40 ha)
- Built: 1916
- Architectural style: Classical Revival
- MPS: Louisa MRA
- NRHP reference No.: 88002043
- Added to NRHP: November 1, 1988

Louisa United Methodist Church is a historic church at Main Cross and Madison Streets in Louisa, Kentucky. It was built in 1916 and added to the National Register of Historic Places in 1988.

The present church, built in 1916, is the third building for the congregation. Little is known about the previous buildings and the current building's plans, reportedly because records about the church are stored within its cornerstone and hence unavailable.
