= Fred M. Vinson =

Chief Justice of the United States from 1946 to 1953

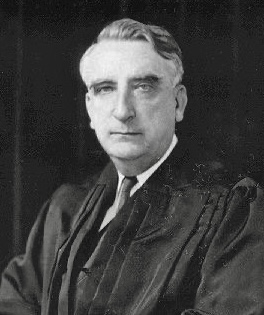
- Vinson, c. 1950

13th Chief Justice of the United States
- In office June 24, 1946 – September 8, 1953
- Nominated by: Harry S. Truman
- Preceded by: Harlan F. Stone
- Succeeded by: Earl Warren

53rd United States Secretary of the Treasury
- In office July 23, 1945 – June 23, 1946
- President: Harry S. Truman
- Preceded by: Henry Morgenthau Jr.
- Succeeded by: John Wesley Snyder

Director of the Office of Economic Stabilization
- In office May 28, 1943 – July 23, 1945
- President: Franklin D. Roosevelt
- Preceded by: James F. Byrnes
- Succeeded by: William Hammatt Davis

Judge of the United States Court of Appeals for the District of Columbia Circuit
- In office December 15, 1937 – May 28, 1943
- Nominated by: Franklin D. Roosevelt
- Preceded by: Charles Henry Robb
- Succeeded by: Wilbur Kingsbury Miller

Member of the U.S. House of Representatives from Kentucky
- In office March 4, 1931 – May 27, 1938
- Preceded by: Elva R. Kendall
- Succeeded by: Joe B. Bates
- Constituency: 9th district (1931–1933); 8th district (1933–1938)
- In office January 24, 1924 – March 3, 1929
- Preceded by: William J. Fields
- Succeeded by: Elva R. Kendall
- Constituency: 9th district

Personal details
- Born: Frederick Moore Vinson; January 22, 1890 Louisa, Kentucky, U.S.
- Died: September 8, 1953 (aged 63) Washington, D.C., U.S.
- Resting place: Pinehill Cemetery, Louisa, Kentucky, U.S.
- Party: Democratic
- Spouse: Julia Dixon (m. 1924)
- Children: 2
- Education: Centre College (BA, LLB)

Military service
- Service: United States Army
- Years of service: 1918
- Rank: Private
- Unit: 159th Depot Brigade, Camp Zachary Taylor; Officers Training School, Camp Pike
- Wars: World War I

Frederick Moore Vinson (January 22, 1890 – September 8, 1953) was an American attorney and politician who served as the 13th chief justice of the United States from 1946 until his death in 1953. Vinson was one of the few Americans to have served in all three branches of the U.S. government. Before becoming chief justice, Vinson served as a U.S. representative from Kentucky from 1924 to 1928 and 1930 to 1938, as a federal appellate judge on the U.S. Court of Appeals for the District of Columbia Circuit from 1938 to 1943, and as the U.S. secretary of the treasury from 1945 to 1946.

Born in Louisa, Kentucky, Vinson pursued a legal career in Louisa, and served briefly in the United States Army during World War I. After the war, he served as the Commonwealth's Attorney for the Thirty-Second Judicial District of Kentucky before winning election to the U.S. House of Representatives in 1924. He lost re-election in 1928 but regained his seat in 1930 and served in Congress until 1937. During his time in Congress, he became an adviser and confidante of Missouri Senator Harry S. Truman. In 1937, President Franklin D. Roosevelt appointed Vinson to be a judge on the D.C. Circuit. Vinson resigned from the appellate court in 1943, when he became the Director of the Office of Economic Stabilization. After Truman acceded to the presidency following Roosevelt's death in 1945, Truman appointed Vinson to the position of Secretary of the Treasury. Vinson negotiated the payment of the Anglo-American loan and presided over the establishment of numerous post-war organizations, including the International Bank for Reconstruction and Development (commonly called the World Bank) and the International Monetary Fund.

After the death of Chief Justice Harlan F. Stone in 1946, Truman appointed Vinson to the Supreme Court. Vinson dissented in the case of Youngstown Sheet & Tube Co. v. Sawyer, which ruled against the Truman administration's control of the nation's steel mills during a strike. He ordered a rehearing of the Briggs v. Elliott case, which was eventually combined into the case known as Brown v. Board of Education. He is the most recent Chief Justice to be nominated by a Democratic president.

== Early years ==
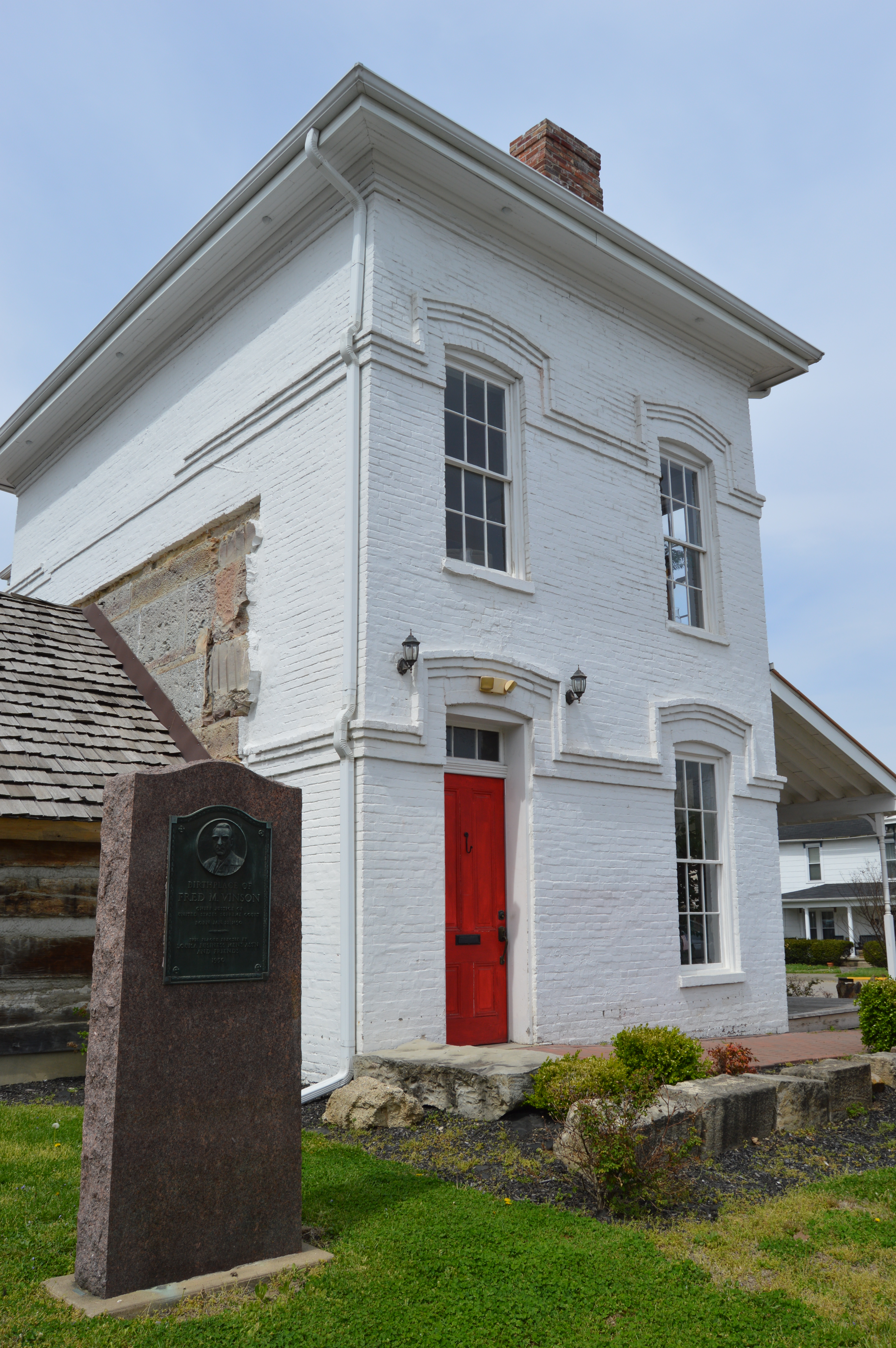
Birthplace in Louisa, Kentucky

Vinson, known universally as Fred, was born in the newly built, eight-room, red brick house in front of the Lawrence County jail in Louisa, Kentucky, where his father served as the Lawrence County Jailer. As a child he would help his father in the jail and even made friends with prisoners who would remember his kindness when he later ran for public office. Vinson worked odd jobs while in school. He graduated from Kentucky Normal School in 1909 and enrolled at Centre College, where he graduated at the top of his class with a Bachelor of Arts degree. While at Centre, he was a member of the Kentucky Alpha Delta chapter of Phi Delta Theta fraternity. He received a Bachelor of Laws from the now defunct College of Law. He entered private practice in Louisa. He first ran for and was elected to office as the City Attorney of Louisa.

During World War I, he supported the effort with speeches in support of bond drives and Red Cross appeals. He tried to enlist in the United States Army, but was rejected twice as underweight. In August 1918, he was finally approved for service. He completed basic training with the 9th Company, 34th Training Battalion, 159th Depot Brigade at Camp Zachary Taylor, Kentucky. Selected for officer training, he was a student at the Camp Pike, Arkansas officer training school when the Armistice of 11 November 1918 ended the war. Following his military service, he was elected Commonwealth's Attorney for the Thirty-Second Judicial District of Kentucky. Vinson married Julia Roberta Dixon on January 24, 1924, in Ashland, Kentucky. They had two sons.

== United States Representative from Kentucky ==
In 1924, Vinson ran in a special election for his district's seat in Congress after William J. Fields resigned to become the Governor of Kentucky. Vinson was elected as a Democrat and then was reelected twice before losing in 1928. His loss was attributed to his refusal to dissociate his campaign from Alfred E. Smith's presidential campaign. However, Vinson came back to win re-election in 1930, and he served in Congress through 1937.

While he was in Congress he befriended Missouri Senator Harry S. Truman, a friendship that would last throughout his life. He soon became a close advisor, confidant, card player, and dear friend to Truman. After Truman decided against running for another term as president in the early 1950s, he tried to convince a skeptical Vinson to seek the Democratic Party nomination, but Vinson turned down the President's offer. After being equally unsuccessful in enlisting General Dwight D. Eisenhower, President Truman eventually landed on Governor of Illinois Adlai Stevenson as his preferred successor in the 1952 presidential election.

In 1930, former congressman Vinson moved his law practice from Louisa, Kentucky thirty miles north to Ashland. With aspirations to return to Washington, D.C. as congressman, Vinson formed a circle of Ashland friends who could aid him politically and professionally. This group included his next door neighbor Paul G. Blazer. Vinson returned to Washington, D.C. as congressman in 1931. Vinson would become a frontline supporter of President Roosevelt and his cabinet's New Deal revolution.

== United States Court of Appeals ==
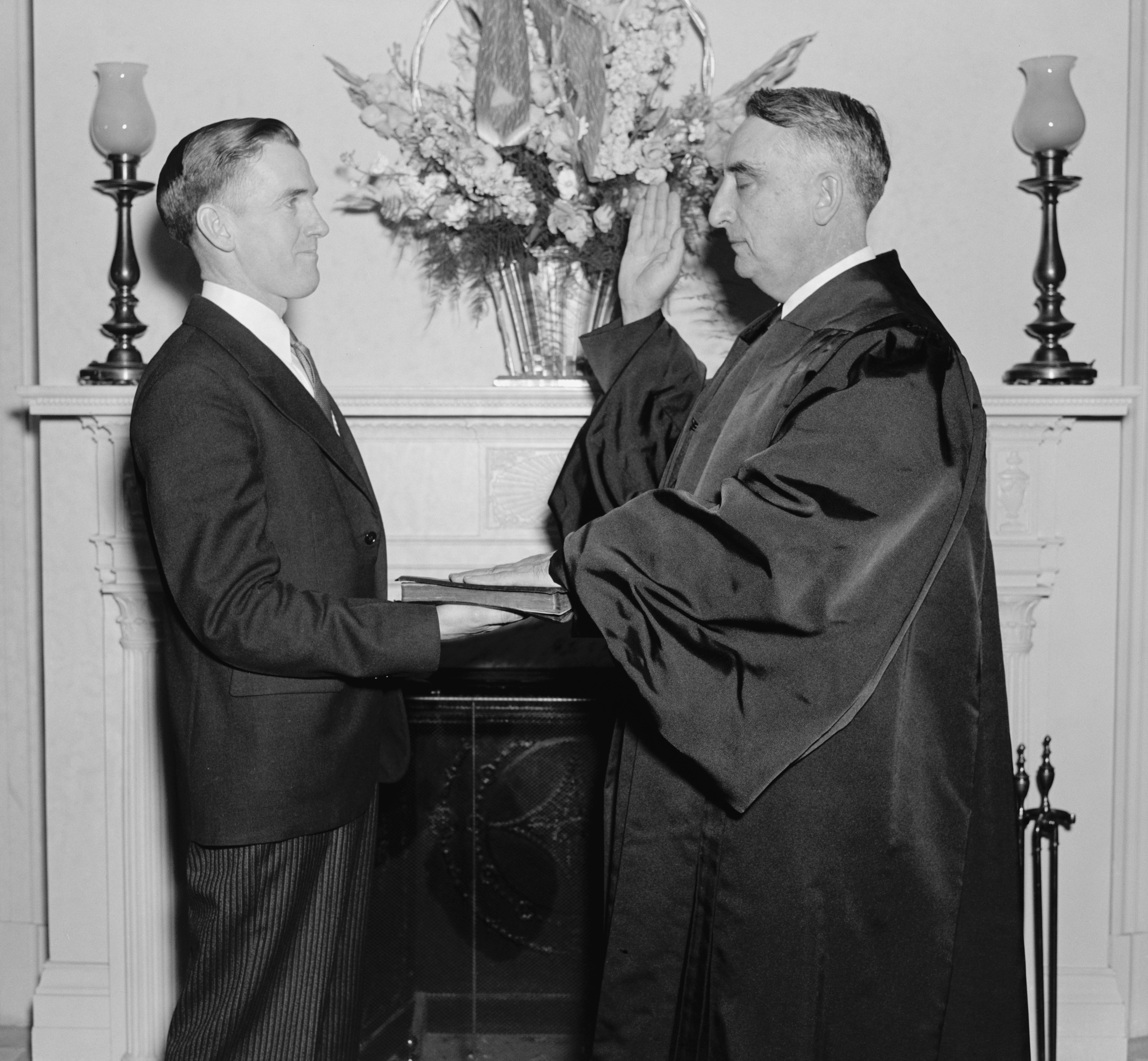
Vinson taking the oath of office as judge of the United States Court of Appeals for the District of Columbia Circuit, 1938

Vinson was nominated by President Franklin D. Roosevelt on November 26, 1937, to an Associate Justice seat on the United States Court of Appeals for the District of Columbia (now the United States Court of Appeals for the District of Columbia Circuit) vacated by Associate Justice Charles Henry Robb. He was confirmed by the United States Senate on December 9 of that year, and received his commission six days later. He was designated by Chief Justice Harlan F. Stone to serve as Chief Judge of the Emergency Court of Appeals. His service terminated on May 28, 1943, due to his resignation.

== Secretary of the Treasury ==
Vinson resigned from the bench to become Director of the Office of Economic Stabilization, an executive agency charged with fighting inflation. He also spent time as Federal Loan Administrator (March 6 to April 3, 1945) and director of War Mobilization and Reconversion (April 4 to July 22, 1945). He was appointed United States Secretary of the Treasury by President Truman and served from July 23, 1945, to June 23, 1946.

His mission as Secretary of the Treasury was to stabilize the American economy during the last months of the war and to adapt the United States financial position to the drastically changed circumstances of the postwar world. Before the war ended, Vinson directed the last of the conflict's major war bond drives.

At the end of the war, he negotiated payment of the British Loan of 1940, the largest loan made by the United States to another country ($3.75 billion), and the lend-lease settlements of economic and military aid given to the allies during the war. In order to encourage private investment in postwar America, he promoted a tax cut in the Revenue Act of 1945. He also supervised the inauguration of the International Bank for Reconstruction and Development and the International Monetary Fund, both created at the Bretton Woods Conference of 1944, acting as the first chairman of their respective boards. In 1946, Vinson resigned from the Treasury so he could accept Truman's appointment as Chief Justice of the United States.

== Chief Justice ==
Swearing in of Chief Justice Vinson on White house portico

Vinson was nominated by President Harry S. Truman on June 6, 1946, to become Chief Justice of the United States, following the death of Harlan F. Stone. Vinson was recommended to Truman by former chief justice Charles Evans Hughes and former associate justice Owen Roberts. Both noted Vinson's experience in all three branches of the federal government, with Hughes telling Truman, "You have a Secretary of the Treasury who has been a Congressman, a Judge of the Court of Appeal, and an executive officer in President Roosevelt's and your cabinets". He was confirmed by the United States Senate by a voice vote on June 20, 1946, received his commission on June 21, and took the oath of office on June 24. His appointment came at a time when the Supreme Court was deeply fractured, both intellectually and personally. One faction was led by Justice Hugo Black, the other by Justice Felix Frankfurter. Vinson was credited with patching this fracture, at least on a personal level. He was the presiding officer of the Conference of Senior Circuit Judges (now the Judicial Conference of the United States) from 1946 to 1948, and presiding officer of the Judicial Conference of the United States from 1948 to 1953. In addition to his chief justiceship, Vinson served as circuit justice for the Fourth Circuit and the District of Columbia Circuit from June 26, 1946, until his death on September 8, 1953.

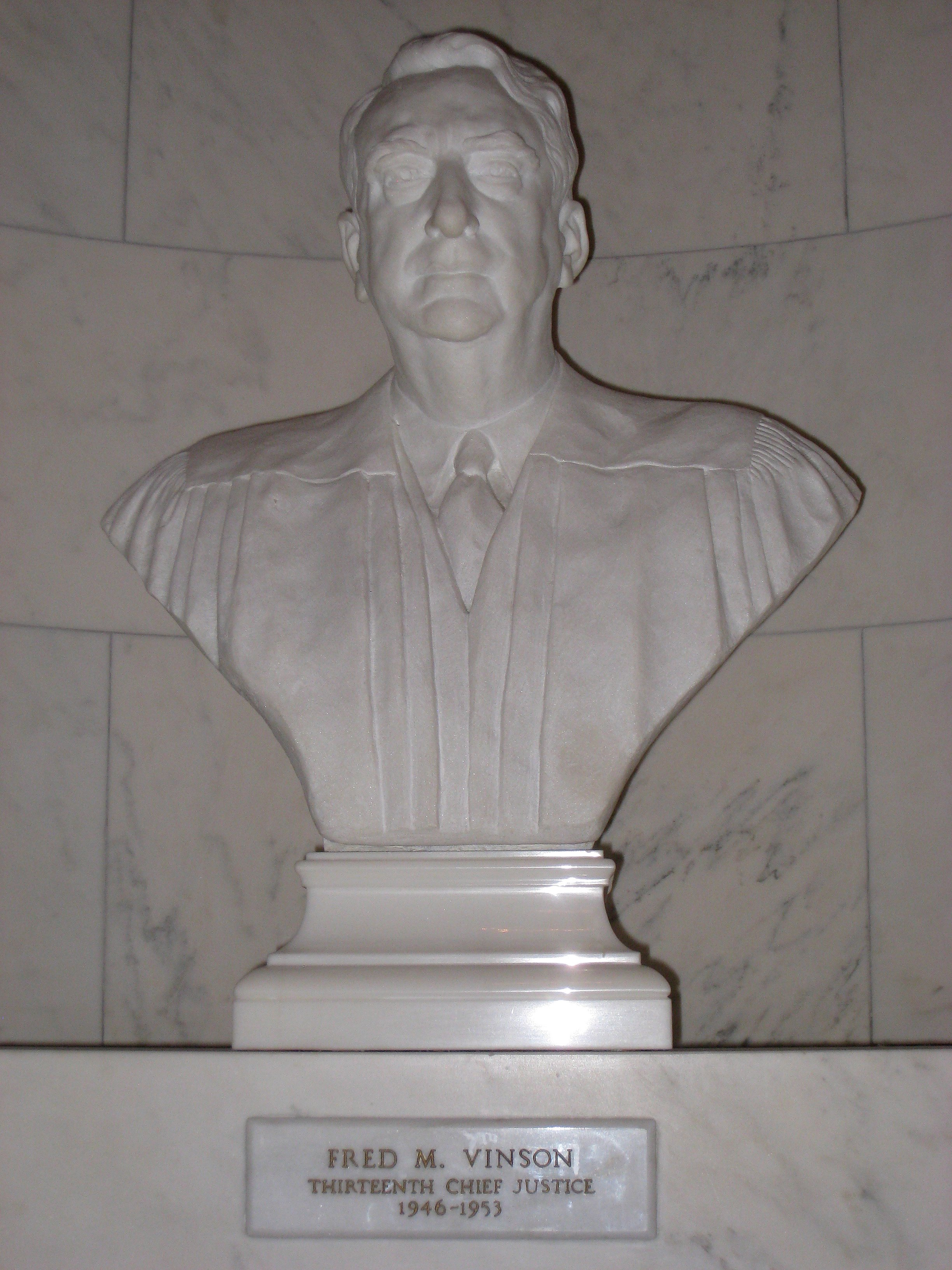
Fred M. Vinson bust, U.S. Supreme Court, Washington, D.C. Sculptor Jimilu Mason.

In his time on the Supreme Court, he wrote 77 opinions for the court and 13 dissents. His most dramatic dissent was when the court voided President Truman's seizure of the steel industry during a strike in a June 3, 1952, decision, Youngstown Sheet & Tube Co. v. Sawyer. His final public appearance at the court was when he read the decision not to review the conviction and death sentence of Julius and Ethel Rosenberg. After Justice William O. Douglas granted a stay of execution to the Rosenbergs at the last moment, Chief Justice Vinson sent special flights out to bring vacationing justices back to Washington in order to ensure the execution of the Rosenbergs. During his tenure as Chief Justice, one of his law clerks was future Associate Justice Byron White.

The major issues his court dealt with included racial segregation, labor unions, communism and loyalty oaths. On racial segregation, he wrote that states practicing the separate but equal doctrine must provide facilities that were truly equal, in Sweatt v. Painter and McLaurin v. Oklahoma State Regents. The case of Briggs v. Elliott was before the Court at the time of his death. Vinson, not wanting a 5–4 decision, had ordered a second hearing of the case. He died before the case could be reheard, and his vote may have been pivotal. Briggs v. Elliott was combined with four other cases challenging segregation in education. This new case became Brown v. Board of Education. Had Vinson lived, there is some speculation that he would have voted to uphold Plessy v. Ferguson in the 1954 Brown case, though law professor Carlton F.W. Larson disputes this and argues that a surviving Fred Vinson, like his successor as SCOTUS Chief Justice Earl Warren, would have likely pushed the U.S. Supreme Court to a unanimous decision declaring school segregation unconstitutional nationwide in 1954. In a 1973 interview, former U.S. Supreme Court Justice Tom C. Clark also said that he thinks that a surviving Fred Vinson would have voted to strike down school segregation as unconstitutional in the 1954 Brown v. Board of Education case.

When Secretary of State Dean Acheson came under fire from congressional Republicans for being "soft on communism" at the end of 1950 Vinson was briefly mentioned as the possible replacement as Secretary of State, which would have required his resignation from the court. This, however, did not come about.

As Chief Justice, Vinson swore in Truman (in 1949) and Dwight D. Eisenhower (in 1953) as President.

== Death and legacy ==
Vinson died on September 8, 1953, of a heart attack at his Washington home. His body was interred in Pinehill Cemetery in Louisa, Kentucky.

Vinson remains the most recent Kentuckian appointed to the Supreme Court.

An extensive collection of Vinson's personal and judicial papers is archived at the University of Kentucky in Lexington, where they are available for research.

A portrait of Vinson hangs in the hallway of the chapter house of the Kentucky Alpha-Delta chapter of Phi Delta Theta (ΦΔΘ) international fraternity, at Centre College, of which Vinson was a member. Affectionately known as "Dead Fred," since 1967 the portrait has been taken by fraternity members to Centre football and basketball games and other events.

The Fred M. Vinson Birthplace, in Louisa, Kentucky, is listed on the National Register of Historic Places.

== See also ==
- Demographics of the Supreme Court of the United States
- List of justices of the Supreme Court of the United States
- List of United States Supreme Court justices by time in office
- List of law clerks for the chief justice of the United States
- United States Supreme Court cases during the Vinson Court

U.S. House of Representatives
Preceded by William J. Fields	Member of the U.S. House of Representatives from Kentucky's 9th congressional district 1924–1929	Succeeded by Elva R. Kendall
Preceded by Elva R. Kendall	Member of the U.S. House of Representatives from Kentucky's 9th congressional district 1931–1933	Succeeded by John Y. Brown Sr.
Preceded by Ralph Waldo Emerson Gilbert	Member of the U.S. House of Representatives from Kentucky's 8th congressional district 1933–1938	Succeeded by Joe B. Bates
Legal offices
Preceded by Charles Henry Robb	Associate Justice of the United States Court of Appeals for the District of Columbia; 1937–1943	Succeeded by Wilbur Kingsbury Miller
Position established	Chief Judge of the Emergency Court of Appeals; 1942–1943	Succeeded by Albert Branson Maris
Preceded by Harlan F. Stone	Chief Justice of the United States; 1946–1953	Succeeded by Earl Warren
Political offices
Preceded by James F. Byrnes	Director of the Office of Economic Stabilization; 1943–1945	Succeeded by William Hammatt Davis
Preceded by Henry Morgenthau Jr.	United States Secretary of the Treasury; 1945–1946	Succeeded by John Wesley Snyder
