= Kentucky Route 180 =

State highway in Kentucky, United States

Kentucky Route 180
- KY 180 highlighted in red

Route information
- Maintained by KYTC
- Length: 2.514 mi (4.046 km)

Major junctions
- West end: US 60 / KY 3294 near Cannonsburg
- I-64 near Cannonsburg
- East end: KY 3 near Cannonsburg

Location
- Country: United States
- State: Kentucky
- Counties: Boyd

Highway system
- Kentucky State Highway System; Interstate; US; State; Parkways
← KY 179	→ KY 181

Kentucky Route 180 (KY 180) is a 2.514-mile-long (4.046 km) state highway in the U.S. state of Kentucky. It serves as a connector route between US 60 and KY 3. It is two lanes from KY 3 to just south of I-64 and four lanes divided from just south of I-64 to US 60.

== Route description ==
KY 180 begins at an intersection with US 60 and KY 3294 about 1.777 miles (2.860 km) north of I-64 near Cannonsburg. It heads southeast running by Little Sandy River and passing by Boyd County High School, as well as a subdivision before forming a junction with I-64. The route then continues southeast for another 0.737 miles (1.186 km) and narrows down from four lanes to two lanes before terminating at the intersection of KY 3 in a rural area of Boyd County.

== History ==
The alignment from Interstate 64 to US 60 was constructed in the 1970s as part of an upgrade that included US 60 that would act as an urban penetrator from Interstate 64 to Ashland, Kentucky. KY 180's former two-lane highway is now known as KY 3291 which ends at its intersection with Kentucky Route 3294 (formerly U.S. Route 60 Alternate and before that The Midland Trail) in the Ashland suburb of Cannonsburg.

The Interstate 64 interchange previously featured higher-than-average accident levels. The four-lane divided highway narrowed from four lanes to two just shy of the interchange. Coupled with a sub-standard ramp system for Interstate 64 that featured short and steep ramps, and a loop that was not controlled by a traffic signal, it produced terrible consequences. Due to the increased volume, the interchange was reconstructed as a conventional diamond, and KY 180 was widened to four lanes divided from its present four-lane terminus to just shy of KY 3, its southern terminus. This project was completed in October 2008.

== Major intersections ==
The entire route is in Boyd County.

Location	mi	km	Destinations	Notes
	0.000	0.000	US 60 / KY 3294 (Cannonsburg Road)	
	1.143	1.839	KY 3291 (Midland Trail Road) – Cannonsburg	
	1.777	2.860	I-64 – Catlettsburg, Huntington, Lexington	I-64 exit 185
	2.514	4.046	KY 3	
1.000 mi = 1.609 km; 1.000 km = 0.621 mi
