= Yatesville Lake State Park =

State park in Kentucky, United States

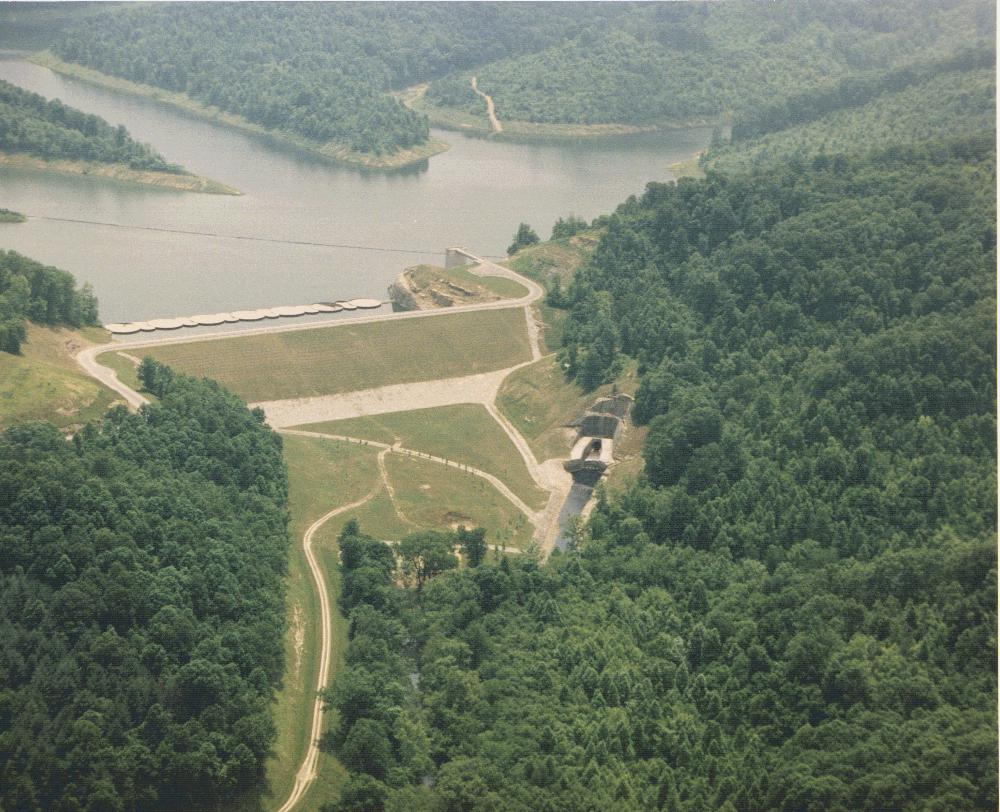
- Aerial view of Yatesville Lake

- Location within Kentucky Location within the United States
- Type: Kentucky state park
- Location: Lawrence County, Kentucky, United States
- Coordinates: 38°05′06″N 82°41′11″W
- Area: 39 acres (16 ha)
- Established: 1992
- Administrator: Kentucky Department of Parks
- Website: Official website

Yatesville Lake State Park in Kentucky is a recreational facility in the eastern part of the commonwealth, close to the town of Louisa, Kentucky in Lawrence County. The park occupies a peninsula on Yatesville Lake, an impoundment of Blaine Creek that covers 2,300 acres (930 ha), has three islands, and averages 40 feet in depth. The park features an 18-hole golf course, boating, fishing and swimming, campsites, and hiking trails.
