= Mazie, Kentucky =

Unincorporated community in Kentucky, United States

- Unincorporated community
- Location in Kentucky Location in the United States
- Coordinates: 38°1′37″N 82°58′21″W
- Country: United States
- State: Kentucky
- County: Lawrence
- Elevation: 755 ft (230 m)
- Time zone: UTC-5 (Eastern (EST))
  - Summer (DST): UTC-4 (EDT)
- ZIP code: 41160
- GNIS feature ID: 508572

Mazie is an unincorporated community located in Lawrence County, Kentucky, United States. Its post office is closed. All that is there now is a repair business, an electric power substation and two houses.
