= Elva R. Kendall =

American politician (1893–1968)

Elva Roscoe Kendall
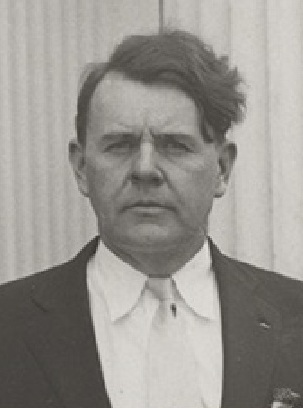

Member of the U.S. House of Representatives from Kentucky's 9th district
- In office March 4, 1929 – March 3, 1931
- Preceded by: Fred M. Vinson
- Succeeded by: Fred M. Vinson

Personal details
- Born: February 14, 1893 Carlisle, Kentucky, U.S.
- Died: January 29, 1968 (aged 74) Carlisle, Kentucky, U.S.
- Party: Republican

Elva Roscoe Kendall (February 14, 1893 – January 29, 1968) was a U.S. representative from Kentucky.

Born near Carlisle, Kentucky, Kendall attended the public schools, YMCA School of Accountancy at New York City, and National University at Washington, D.C. He engaged as a public accountant and tax consultant, and was also interested in agricultural pursuits.

During World War I, Kendall was in the personnel office of the Sixty-first Division. He enlisted on May 1, 1918, and was discharged November 26, 1918 as a private while serving with the 113th Receiving Battalion, 157th Depot Brigade. He initially reported to Fort Thomas, Kentucky. He was employed as a field auditor for the United States Treasury Department 1922–1927.

Kendall was elected as a Republican to the Seventy-first Congress (March 4, 1929 – March 3, 1931). He was an unsuccessful candidate for reelection in 1930 to the Seventy-second Congress. He then resumed agricultural pursuits and his profession as a public accountant, as well as engaging in the real estate business. He was a resident of Carlisle until his death on January 29, 1968.

U.S. House of Representatives
Preceded by Fred M. Vinson	Member of the U.S. House of Representatives from Kentucky's 9th congressional district 1929-1931	Succeeded by Fred M. Vinson
