= Big Sandy Milling Company =

- U.S. National Register of Historic Places
- Location within Kentucky Location within the United States
- Location: Pike St. between Lock Ave. and RR tracks, Louisa, Kentucky
- Coordinates: 38°07′00″N 82°36′20″W
- Area: less than one acre
- Built: 1840
- Architectural style: Antebellum Industrial
- MPS: Louisa MRA
- NRHP reference No.: 88002045
- Added to NRHP: November 1, 1988

The Big Sandy Milling Company, in Louisa, Kentucky was listed on the National Register of Historic Places in 1988.

It has also been known as the Louisa Supply Company, the Louisa Flour & Feed Co., and as Louisa Milling Company. It was located on Pike St. between Lock Ave. and railroad tracks.

It was a three-story post-and-beam structure with a full basement. The posts were 12 inches (0.30 m) to 14 inches (0.36 m) square.

It was deemed significant as it probably was Louisa's oldest extant industrial and commercial establishment and it had "reinforced Louisa's regional status as a trade town, as it would bring area farmers here to trade their grain or to get it processed", and it was "a rare example of post and beam/mortise and tenon construction of such a large building for Eastern Kentucky."

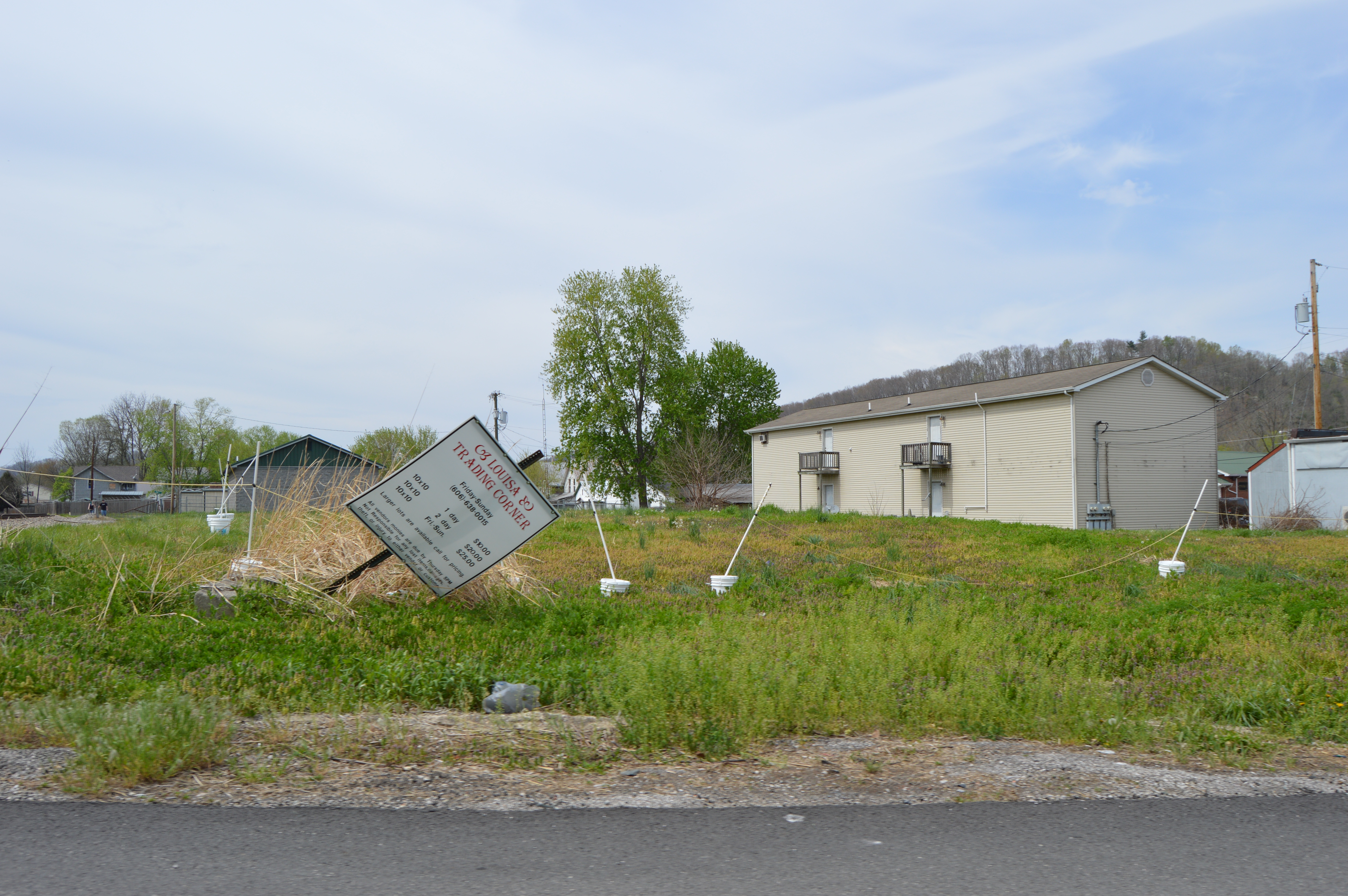
Site, in 2014

The building was destroyed in a rather large fire around 1997.
