= Kise, Kentucky =

Unincorporated community in Kentucky, United States

- Unincorporated community
- Location in Kentucky Location in the United States
- Coordinates: 37°59′17″N 82°39′34″W
- Country: United States
- State: Kentucky
- County: Lawrence
- Elevation: 591 ft (180 m)
- Time zone: UTC-5 (Eastern (EST))
  - Summer (DST): UTC-4 (EDT)
- GNIS feature ID: 510117

Kise was an unincorporated community located in Lawrence County, Kentucky, United States.

In 1908, Kise had three stores, two mills, two blacksmith shops, and a court presided over by one Squire Berry. In 1919, local farmers began to construct a lime shed at the Kise railroad siding. Farmers in the area reported having excellent crops in 1917.
