= Louisa Commercial Historic District =

- U.S. National Register of Historic Places
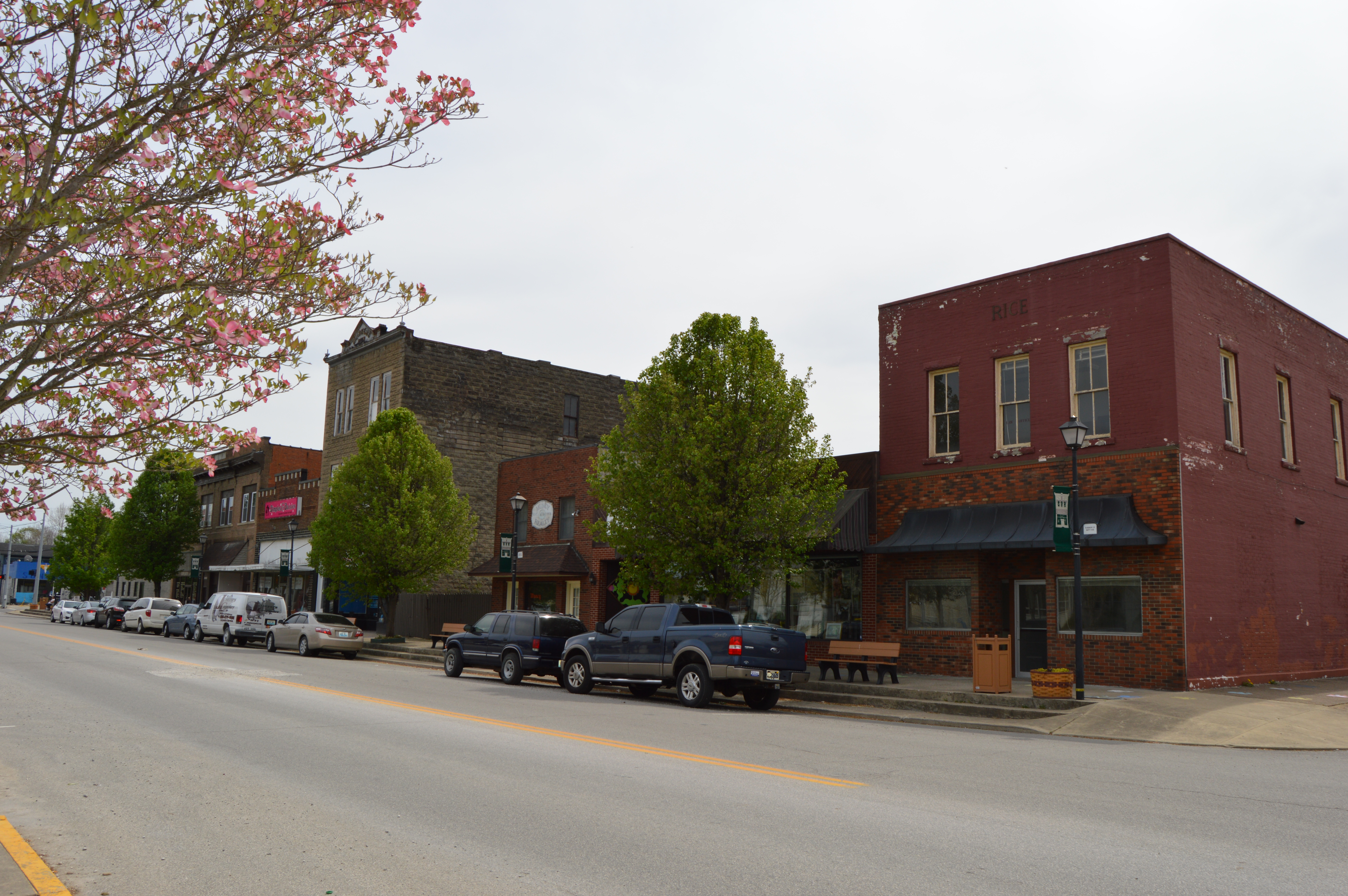

- Location within Kentucky Location within the United States
- Location: E. Main and Main Cross Sts., Louisa, Kentucky
- Coordinates: 38°06′59″N 82°36′11″W
- Area: 2.2 acres (0.89 ha)
- Architectural style: Late Victorian, Queen Anne
- MPS: Louisa MRA
- NRHP reference No.: 88002041
- Added to NRHP: November 1, 1988

The Louisa Commercial Historic District, in Louisa, Kentucky, is a 2.2 acres (0.89 ha) historic district which was listed on the National Register of Historic Places in 1988. The listing included six contributing buildings.

It includes:

- Snyder Brothers Hardware (c.1885), 309-313 E. Main St., a two-story brick building
- Gunnell's Department Store (1892), 217 E. Main St.
- Service Chevrolet Co., NE corner of E. Main St. and Main Cross St.
- Woods Building (1921), 110-114 Main Cross St., a two-story brick building
- Recorder Building (1925), 116 Main Cross St., originally home of a Republican newspaper
- F. Snyder Building (1927), 118-122 Main Cross St.
