= Yatesville Lake =

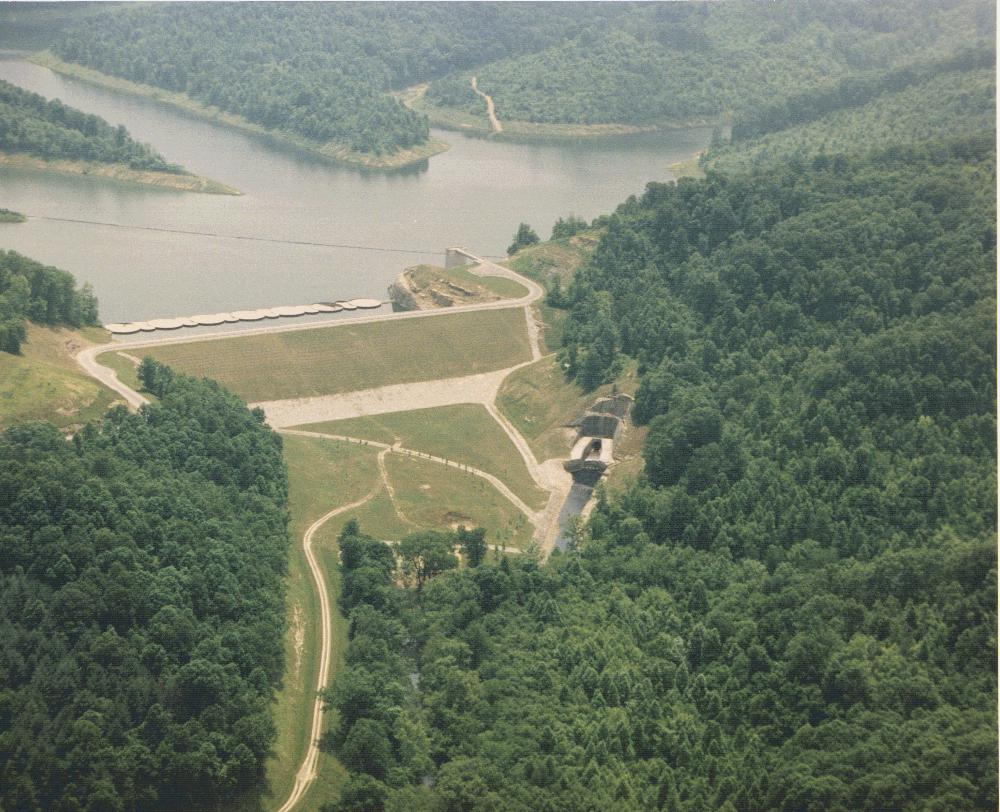
- Yatesville Dam and Lake

- Location within Kentucky
- Location: Lawrence County, Kentucky, United States
- Coordinates: 38°07′34″N 82°41′49″W
- Type: Reservoir
- Primary inflows: Blaine Creek
- Basin countries: United States
- Max. depth: 60 ft (18 m)
- Water volume: Maximum: 83,300 acre⋅ft (0.1027 km^{3})

Yatesville Lake is a reservoir in Lawrence County, Kentucky in the far eastern part of the state, close to the town of Louisa.

The earthen dam was constructed in 1988 by the United States Army Corps of Engineers, with a height of 156 feet, and a length of 855 feet at its crest. It impounds Blaine Creek, a tributary of the Big Sandy River, for flood control and storm water management. The dam is owned and operated by the Huntington District, Great Lakes and Ohio River Division, Army Corps of Engineers.

The serpentine reservoir it creates, Yatesville Lake, has a normal water surface of 3.5 square miles, a maximum capacity of 83,300 acre-feet, and a normal capacity of 63,000 acre-feet. The maximum depth of the lake is 60 feet with an average mean depth of 17.7 feet. The shoreline measures 93.9 miles at summer pool level. Recreation includes fishing, hiking, and an 18-hole golf course at the Yatesville Lake State Park.

== General ==
Yatesville Lake is located entirely in Lawrence County, Kentucky, on Blaine Creek; a tributary of the Big Sandy River. It was built under the Flood Control Act of 1965. The dam is rockfill, with a central impervious core and founded on rock. The length of the lake and boatable arms is 20.6 miles upstream from the dam and 18.1 miles upstream from where it flows into the Big Sandy River. The maximum depth of the lake is 60 feet with an average mean depth of 17.7 feet. The shoreline measures 93.9 miles at summer pool level. The lake's watershed is 208 miles. Winter Pool Elevation - 624.0 m.s.l. (1,745 acres) Summer Pool Elevation - 630.0 m.s.l. (2,242 acres) Flood Pool Elevation - 645.0 m.s.l. (3,805 acres).

== Historical Information ==
Adams Cabin, located in the Project's Information Center, was built in the mid-nineteenth century. It was originally located on a Blaine Creek farmstead of several hundred acres with a household of eleven people. When the lake was being constructed, the house was documented and removed. A Wicket Dam Exhibit is located in the Project's Information Center. From 1875 until the turn of the century, the Corps of Engineers constructed a series of 53 wicket dams to canalize the Ohio River to meet the demands of year-round navigation beginning at Davis Island near Pittsburgh, Pennsylvania and traveling the length of the river to Cairo, Illinois. The exhibit depicts this process. An Oil Well Exhibit is located adjacent to the Project Office/Information Center parking lot. The oil well equipment was pulled from an oil field at Little Blaine Creek before the water from the lake covered the site. The exhibit depicts the common method of oil production at the turn of the century.
