= Captain Freese House =

- Capt. Freese House
- U.S. National Register of Historic Places
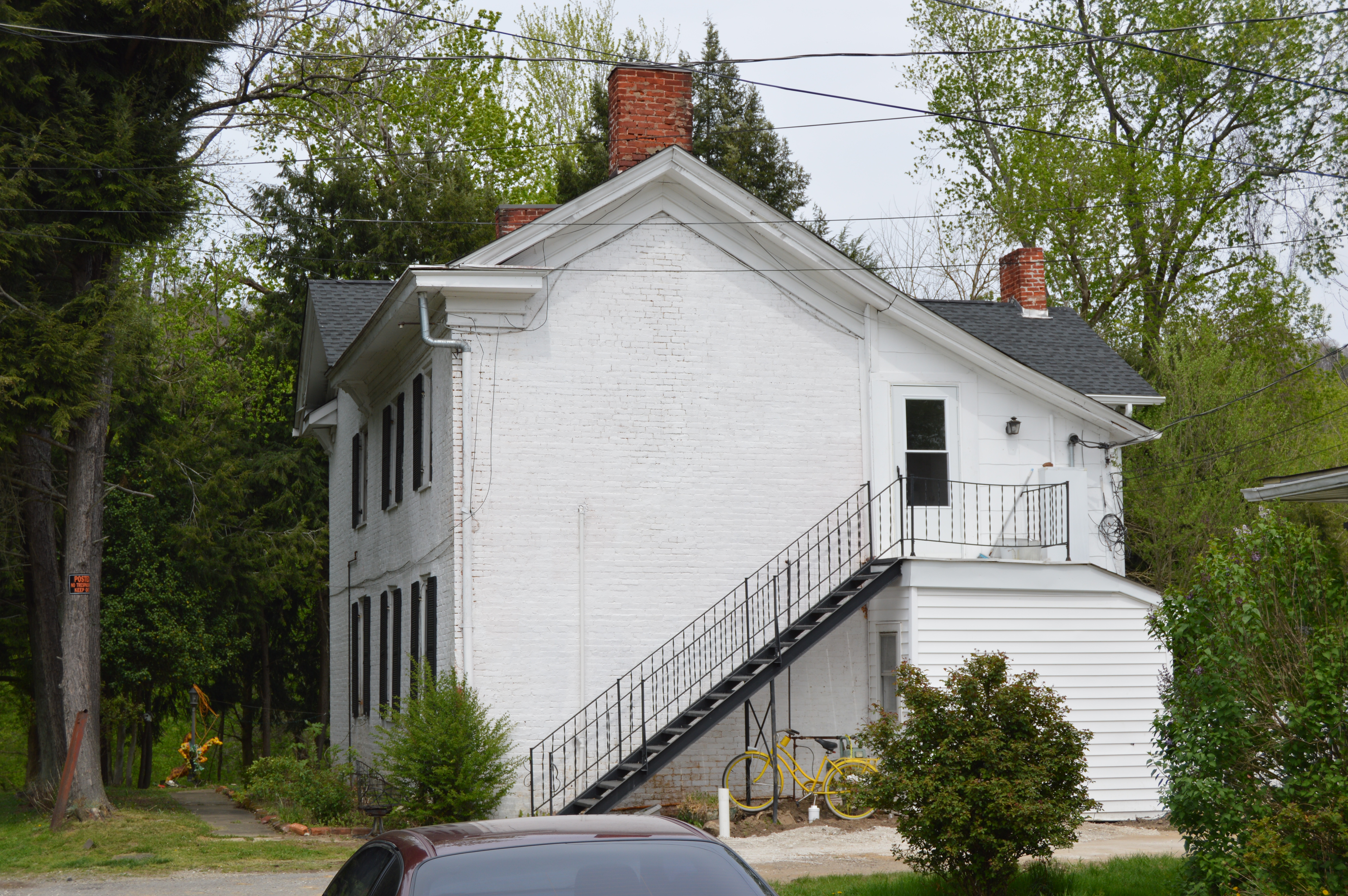

- Location within Kentucky Location within the United States
- Location: Sycamore St. facing Big Sandy River, Louisa, Kentucky
- Coordinates: 38°07′13″N 82°36′24″W
- Area: less than one acre
- Built: 1853
- Architectural style: Antebellum Vernacular
- MPS: Louisa MRA
- NRHP reference No.: 88002042
- Added to NRHP: November 1, 1988

The Capt. Freese House, on Sycamore St. facing the Big Sandy River in Louisa, Kentucky, United States was built in 1853. It was listed on the National Register of Historic Places in the year 1988.

Its architecture has been described as "Antebellum Vernacular".

It was part of a farm that used the Big Sandy River to export its crops and was deemed notable as "a good representative of Louisa's early settlement and agricultural and commercial patterns."

The house was equipped to serve as a hospital during the American Civil War but was not used in that capacity.
