= Vinson House (Little Rock, Arkansas) =

Historic house in Arkansas, United States

- U.S. National Register of Historic Places
- U.S. Historic district – Contributing property
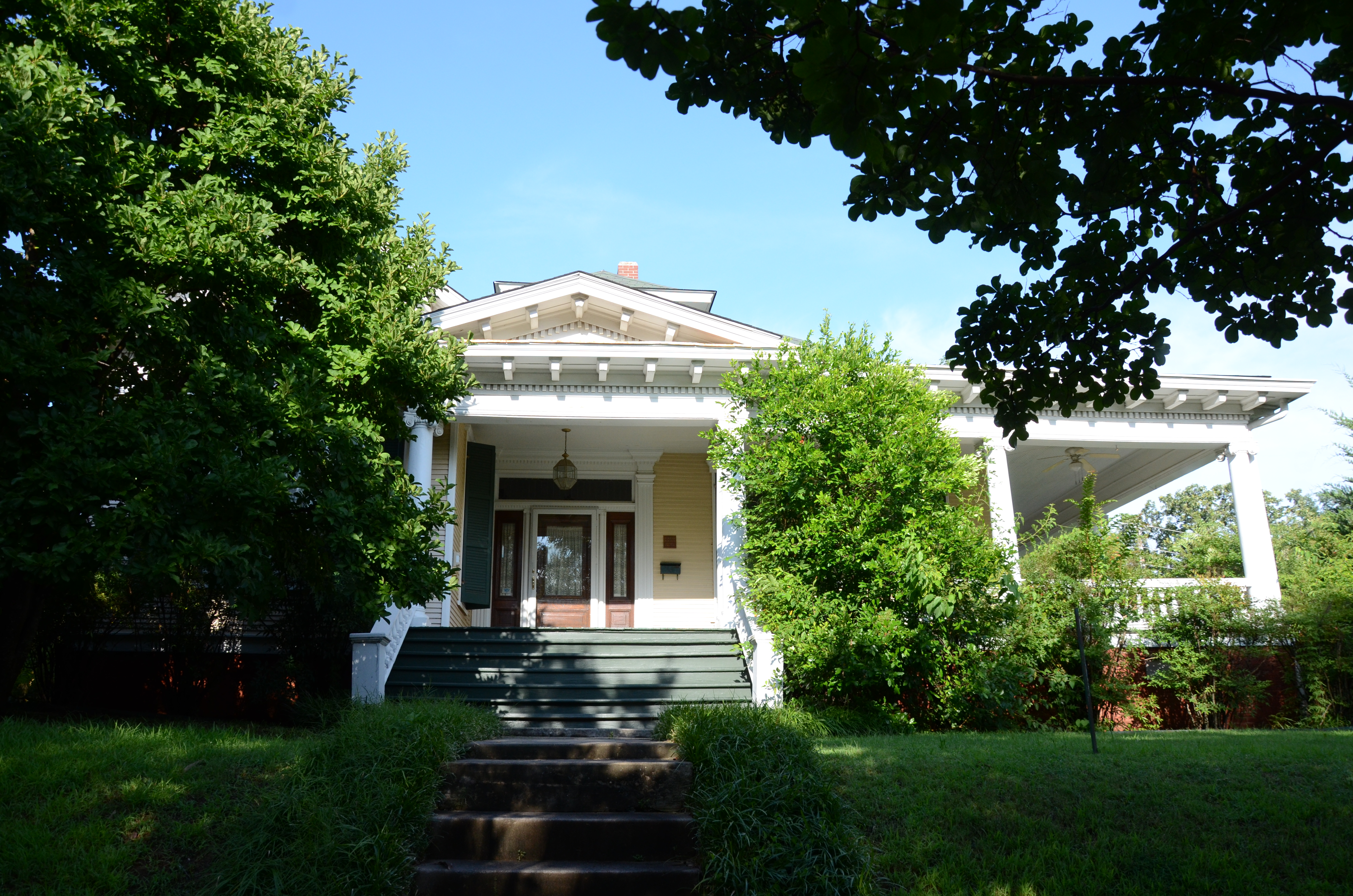

- Location within Arkansas Location within the United States
- Location: 2123 Broadway, Little Rock, Arkansas
- Coordinates: 34°43′39″N 92°16′42″W
- Area: less than one acre
- Built: 1905
- Architect: Charles L. Thompson
- Architectural style: Classical Revival
- Part of: Governor's Mansion Historic District (ID78000620)
- NRHP reference No.: 76000461

Significant dates
- Added to NRHP: May 6, 1976
- Designated CP: September 13, 1978

The Vinson House is a historic house at 2123 Broadway in Little Rock, Arkansas. It is a single-story wood-frame structure, with broad Classical Revival styling. It has a hip roof, with projecting gables on several sides, and a modillioned cornice. A porch wraps around three sides of the house, supported by Ionic columns. The main entrance is framed by sidelight and transom windows, with pilasters and an entablature. The house was built in 1905 to a design by noted Arkansas architect Charles L. Thompson.

The house was listed on the National Register of Historic Places in 1976.

== See also ==
- National Register of Historic Places listings in Little Rock, Arkansas
