= Fred M. Vinson Museum and Welcome Center =

- Fred M. Vinson Birthplace
- U.S. National Register of Historic Places
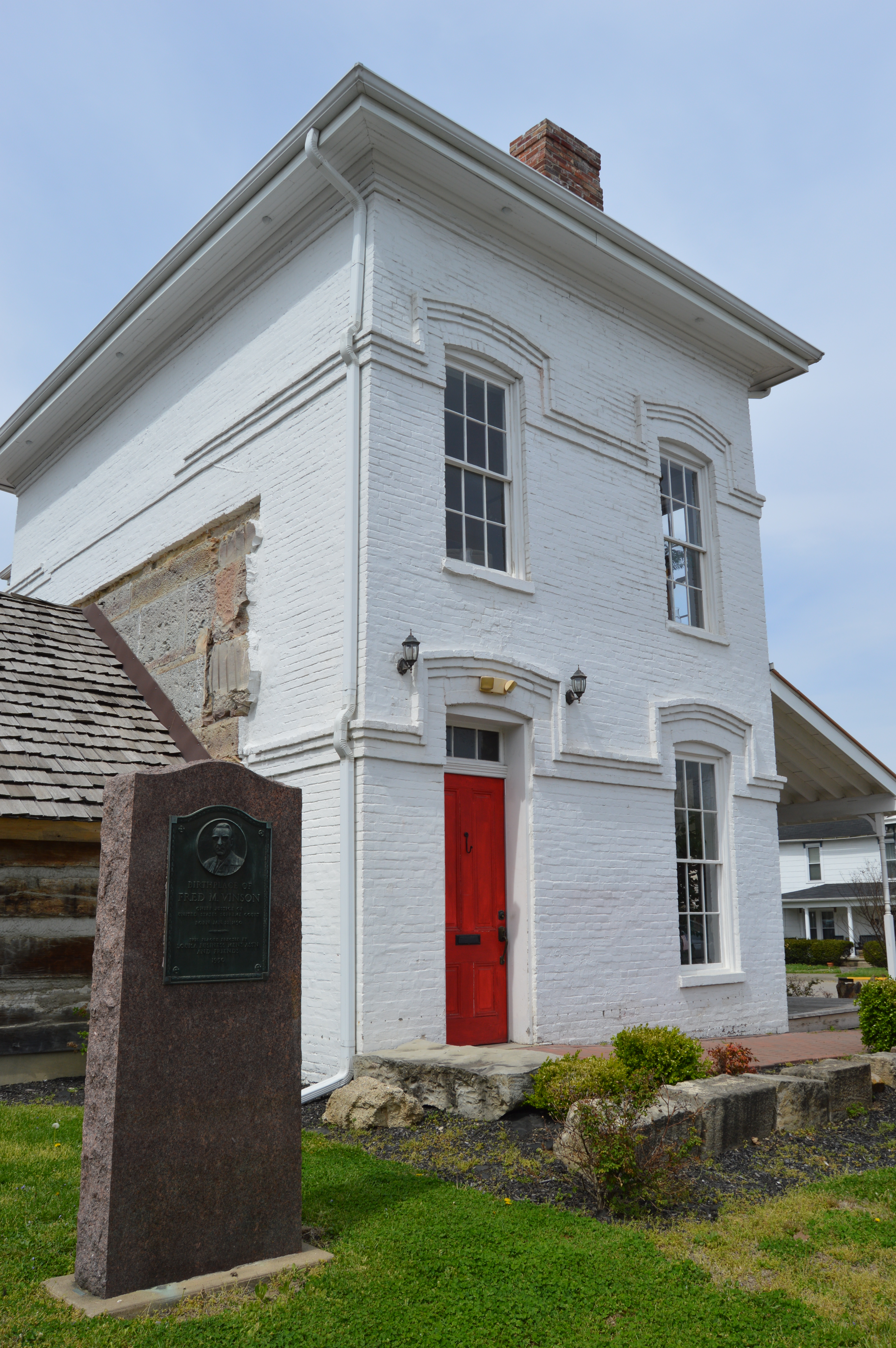
- Location: E. Madison and Vinson Blvd., Louisa, Kentucky
- Coordinates: 38°06′55″N 82°36′07″W
- Area: 4.9 acres (2.0 ha)
- Built: 1889
- NRHP reference No.: 74000890
- Added to NRHP: September 4, 1974

Fred M. Vinson Birthplace, at E. Madison and Vinson Blvd. in Louisa, Kentucky, also known as Old Jailer's House, was listed on the National Register of Historic Places in 1974.

It was the birthplace and early home of Fred M. Vinson (January 22, 1890 – September 8, 1953), who became the 13th Chief Justice of the United States.

It is an eight-room two-story brick house completed in 1889, the year before Vinson's birth, built as a Jailer's Residence on the Courthouse Square in Louisa, the county seat of Lawrence County to serve as the home of Vinson's father, who served as jailer of Lawrence County. The Fred M. Vinson Museum and Welcome Center is located on the premises.
