= Levi, Kentucky =

Unincorporated community in Kentucky, United States

Levi
- Unincorporated community
- Location within the state of Kentucky Levi (the United States)
- Coordinates: 37°28′49″N 83°43′15″W
- Country: United States
- State: Kentucky
- County: Owsley
- Elevation: 830 ft (250 m)
- Time zone: UTC-5 (Eastern (EST))
  - Summer (DST): UTC-4 (EDT)
- GNIS feature ID: 513349

Levi is an unincorporated community located in Owsley County, Kentucky, United States. Its post office is closed.
