= Auxier, Kentucky =

Census-designated place in Kentucky, United States

- Census-designated place
- Location in Kentucky
- Coordinates: 37°44′08″N 82°45′58″W
- Country: United States
- State: Kentucky
- County: Floyd

Area
  - Total: 0.96 sq mi (2.49 km^{2})
  - Land: 0.92 sq mi (2.39 km^{2})
  - Water: 0.039 sq mi (0.10 km^{2})
- Elevation: 820 ft (250 m)

Population (2020)
  - Total: 715
  - Density: 775.1/sq mi (299.27/km^{2})
- Time zone: UTC-5 (Eastern (EST))
  - Summer (DST): UTC-4 (EDT)
- ZIP code: 41602
- FIPS code: 21-02764
- GNIS feature ID: 2629568

Auxier is an unincorporated community and census-designated place (CDP) in Floyd County, Kentucky, United States. As of the 2020 census, Auxier had a population of 715.

== History ==
Auxier had its start around 1900 as a coal town. The community was named for the local Auxier family.

== Geography ==
Auxier is located along the northern edge of Floyd County, bordered to the south, east, and northeast by the Levisa Fork and to the north by Johnson County. Prestonsburg, the Floyd County seat, is 6 miles (10 km) to the south. According to the U.S. Census Bureau, the Auxier CDP has a total area of 0.97 square miles (2.5 km^{2}), of which 0.93 square miles (2.4 km^{2}) is land and 0.04 square miles (0.1 km^{2}), or 3.85%, is water.

== Demographics ==
Historical population
Census	Pop.	Note	%±
2020	715		—
U.S. Decennial Census
