= Lawrence County, Kentucky =

County in Kentucky, United States

- County
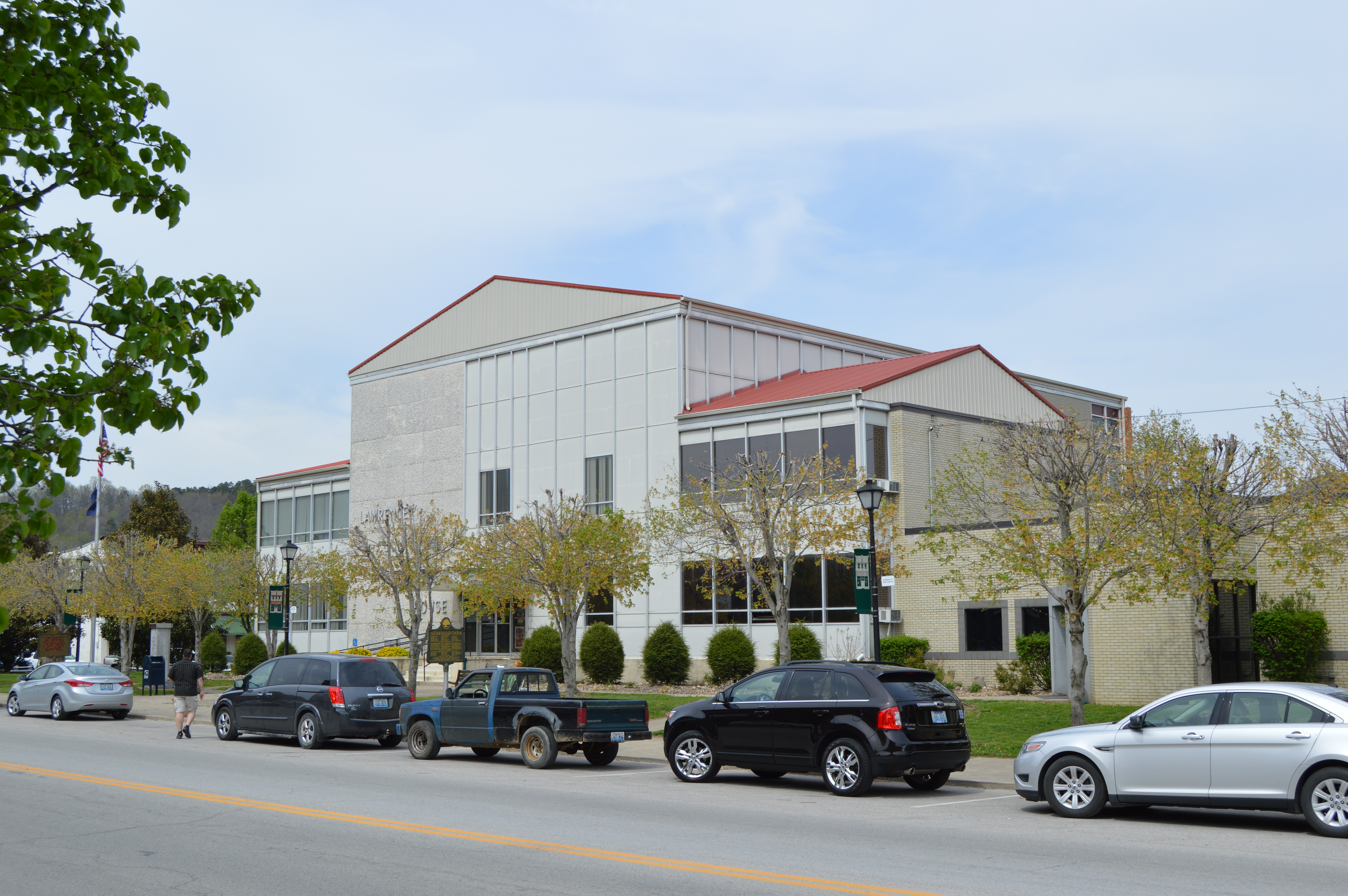
- Lawrence County Courthouse in Louisa

- Location within the U.S. state of Kentucky
- Coordinates: 38°04′N 82°44′W
- Country: United States
- State: Kentucky
- Founded: December 14, 1821
- Named for: James Lawrence
- Seat: Louisa
- Largest city: Louisa

Government
  - Judge/Executive: Phillip Carter (R)

Area
  - Total: 420 sq mi (1,100 km^{2})
  - Land: 416 sq mi (1,080 km^{2})
  - Water: 4.5 sq mi (12 km^{2}) 1.1%

Population (2020)
  - Total: 16,293
  - Estimate (2025): 15,765 ▼
  - Density: 39.2/sq mi (15.1/km^{2})
- Time zone: UTC−5 (Eastern)
  - Summer (DST): UTC−4 (EDT)
- Congressional district: 5th
- Website: lawrencecountyky.gov

Lawrence County is a county located in the U.S. state of Kentucky. As of the 2020 census, the population was 16,293. Its county seat is Louisa.

Named for James Lawrence, a naval officer from the War of 1812, Lawrence County has produced many country music stars including Tyler Childers, Larry Cordle, Ricky Skaggs, and Noah Thompson as well as late Chief Justice of the United States Fred M. Vinson and former Kentucky governor Paul E. Patton.

In regard to alcoholic beverage sales, Lawrence County is considered a "moist" county, meaning alcohol sales are only allowed within the city limits of Louisa.

== History ==
Lawrence County was established in 1821 from land given by Floyd and Greenup Counties. Four courthouses have served Lawrence County; the first was completed in 1823.

During the Civil War, 149 men from Lawrence County served in the Confederacy, while 638 men served the Union Army. Louisa was used as a Union fort during the war overlooking the local area.

== Geography ==
According to the United States Census Bureau, the county has a total area of 420 square miles (1,100 km^{2}), of which 416 square miles (1,080 km^{2}) is land and 4.5 square miles (12 km^{2}) (1.1%) is water.

The bridge from Louisa, in eastern Lawrence County, to Fort Gay, West Virginia is a rare multi-way T-bridge. The quarter-mile concrete span spans across the Levisa Fork and the Tug River that come together and form the Big Sandy River, connects two states and has a right turn at its halfway point, which connects traffic to the Point Section neighborhood of Louisa.

=== Yatesville Lake State Park ===
Yatesville Lake was opened in 1992 and is a 2,300 acres (9.3 km^{2}) reservoir managed by the Army Corps of Engineers. Yatesville Lake provides flood control for the region as well as recreational opportunities. The Corps manages a boat ramp at the Rich Creek area.

=== Bordering Counties ===
- Carter County (northwest)
- Boyd County (north)
- Wayne County, West Virginia (east)
- Martin County (southeast)
- Johnson County (south)
- Morgan County (southwest)
- Elliott County (west)

== Demographics ==
Historical population
| Census | Pop. | Note | %± |
|---|---|---|---|
| 1830 | 3,900 | | — |
| 1840 | 4,730 | | 21.3% |
| 1850 | 6,281 | | 32.8% |
| 1860 | 7,601 | | 21.0% |
| 1870 | 8,497 | | 11.8% |
| 1880 | 13,262 | | 56.1% |
| 1890 | 17,702 | | 33.5% |
| 1900 | 19,612 | | 10.8% |
| 1910 | 20,067 | | 2.3% |
| 1920 | 17,643 | | −12.1% |
| 1930 | 16,713 | | −5.3% |
| 1940 | 17,275 | | 3.4% |
| 1950 | 14,418 | | −16.5% |
| 1960 | 12,134 | | −15.8% |
| 1970 | 10,726 | | −11.6% |
| 1980 | 14,121 | | 31.7% |
| 1990 | 13,998 | | −0.9% |
| 2000 | 15,569 | | 11.2% |
| 2010 | 15,860 | | 1.9% |
| 2020 | 16,293 | | 2.7% |
| 2025 (est.) | 15,765 | ▼ | −3.2% |
U.S. Decennial Census; 1790-1960 1900-1990; 1990-2000 2010-2020

=== 2020 census ===
As of the 2020 census, the county had a population of 16,293. The median age was 42.0 years. 23.1% of residents were under the age of 18 and 18.0% of residents were 65 years of age or older. For every 100 females there were 97.9 males, and for every 100 females age 18 and over there were 94.9 males age 18 and over.

The racial makeup of the county was 96.9% White, 0.2% Black or African American, 0.0% American Indian and Alaska Native, 0.1% Asian, 0.0% Native Hawaiian and Pacific Islander, 0.3% from some other race, and 2.4% from two or more races. Hispanic or Latino residents of any race comprised 0.9% of the population.

24.0% of residents lived in urban areas, while 76.0% lived in rural areas.

There were 6,429 households in the county, of which 30.5% had children under the age of 18 living with them and 25.1% had a female householder with no spouse or partner present. About 27.0% of all households were made up of individuals and 12.4% had someone living alone who was 65 years of age or older.

There were 7,524 housing units, of which 14.6% were vacant. Among occupied housing units, 73.8% were owner-occupied and 26.2% were renter-occupied. The homeowner vacancy rate was 1.2% and the rental vacancy rate was 7.9%.

=== 2000 census ===
As of the census of 2000, there were 15,569 people, 5,954 households, and 4,477 families in the county. The population density was 37 per square mile (14/km^{2}). There were 7,040 housing units at an average density of 17 per square mile (6.6/km^{2}). The racial makeup of the county was 98.93% White, 0.10% Black or African American, 0.28% Native American, 0.07% Asian, 0.01% Pacific Islander, 0.05% from other races, and 0.56% from two or more races. 0.41%. were Hispanic or Latino of any race.

Of the 5,954 households 35.00% had children under the age of 18 living with them, 61.30% were married couples living together, 10.50% had a female householder with no husband present, and 24.80% were non-families. 22.40% of households were one person and 10.00% were one person aged 65 or older. The average household size was 2.59 and the average family size was 3.02.

The age distribution was 25.30% under the age of 18, 8.80% from 18 to 24, 28.70% from 25 to 44, 24.70% from 45 to 64, and 12.40% 65 or older. The median age was 36 years. For every 100 females, there were 97.30 males. For every 100 females age 18 and over, there were 93.00 males.

The median household income was $21,610 and the median family income was $26,113. Males had a median income of $30,735 versus $19,174 for females. The per capita income for the county was $12,008. About 25.30% of families and 30.70% of the population were below the poverty line, including 40.00% of those under age 18 and 27.30% of those age 65 or over.

== Politics ==
United States presidential election results for Lawrence County, Kentucky
| Year | Republican | | Democratic | | Third party(ies) | |
| Year | No. | % | No. | % | No. | % |
|---|---|---|---|---|---|---|
| 1912 | 1,280 | 35.48% | 1,648 | 45.68% | 680 | 18.85% |
| 1916 | 1,928 | 49.67% | 1,910 | 49.20% | 44 | 1.13% |
| 1920 | 2,849 | 52.44% | 2,558 | 47.08% | 26 | 0.48% |
| 1924 | 2,547 | 50.16% | 2,445 | 48.15% | 86 | 1.69% |
| 1928 | 3,277 | 59.59% | 2,217 | 40.32% | 5 | 0.09% |
| 1932 | 2,766 | 42.59% | 3,701 | 56.99% | 27 | 0.42% |
| 1936 | 2,944 | 48.04% | 3,175 | 51.81% | 9 | 0.15% |
| 1940 | 3,055 | 48.86% | 3,178 | 50.83% | 19 | 0.30% |
| 1944 | 2,715 | 52.87% | 2,408 | 46.89% | 12 | 0.23% |
| 1948 | 2,117 | 46.50% | 2,372 | 52.10% | 64 | 1.41% |
| 1952 | 2,696 | 50.85% | 2,597 | 48.98% | 9 | 0.17% |
| 1956 | 2,932 | 53.92% | 2,495 | 45.88% | 11 | 0.20% |
| 1960 | 3,030 | 54.69% | 2,510 | 45.31% | 0 | 0.00% |
| 1964 | 1,745 | 39.17% | 2,703 | 60.67% | 7 | 0.16% |
| 1968 | 1,946 | 45.80% | 1,825 | 42.95% | 478 | 11.25% |
| 1972 | 2,392 | 60.48% | 1,529 | 38.66% | 34 | 0.86% |
| 1976 | 1,838 | 42.91% | 2,402 | 56.08% | 43 | 1.00% |
| 1980 | 2,564 | 51.49% | 2,362 | 47.43% | 54 | 1.08% |
| 1984 | 2,713 | 54.71% | 2,223 | 44.83% | 23 | 0.46% |
| 1988 | 2,294 | 50.89% | 2,198 | 48.76% | 16 | 0.35% |
| 1992 | 2,084 | 41.21% | 2,400 | 47.46% | 573 | 11.33% |
| 1996 | 1,812 | 40.24% | 2,195 | 48.75% | 496 | 11.01% |
| 2000 | 2,969 | 55.94% | 2,258 | 42.55% | 80 | 1.51% |
| 2004 | 3,755 | 57.65% | 2,705 | 41.53% | 53 | 0.81% |
| 2008 | 3,503 | 62.01% | 2,036 | 36.04% | 110 | 1.95% |
| 2012 | 3,995 | 71.44% | 1,520 | 27.18% | 77 | 1.38% |
| 2016 | 4,816 | 79.71% | 1,045 | 17.30% | 181 | 3.00% |
| 2020 | 5,633 | 80.99% | 1,238 | 17.80% | 84 | 1.21% |
| 2024 | 5,464 | 83.12% | 1,044 | 15.88% | 66 | 1.00% |

Lawrence County is a state bellwether in presidential elections, having voted for Kentucky's statewide winner in every election since 1956.

=== Elected officials ===
==== State and federal ====
Elected officials as of January 3, 2025
| U.S. House | Hal Rogers (R) | KY 5 |
| Ky. Senate | Phillip Wheeler (R) | 31 |
| Ky. House | Scott Sharp (R) | 100 |

==== County ====
Elected officials as of January 2, 2023
| Judge/Executive | Phillip Carter (R) |
| Magistrate District 1 | Michael Halcomb (R) |
| Magistrate District 2 | John Scaggs (R) |
| Magistrate District 3 | David Pinson (R) |
| Magistrate District 4 | Rick Blackburn (R) |
| Clerk | Chris Jobe (R) |
| Attorney | Johnny Osborne (R) |
| Jailer | Roger Lee Jordan (R) |
| Coroner | Wesley Heston (R) |
| Surveyor | Cliff West (R) |
| Property Value Admin. | Chris Rose (R) |
| Sheriff | Chuck Jackson (R) |

==== Judicial ====
Elected officials as of January 6, 2025
| Ky. Supreme Court, District 7 | Robert B. Conley |
| Ky. Court of Appeals, District 7, Division 1 | Sara Walter Combs |
| Ky. Court of Appeals, District 7, Division 2 | Larry E. Thompson |
| Commonwealth's Attorney | Matt Runyon (R) |
| Circuit Court Clerk | Jodi L. Parsley (R) |
| 24th Circuit, 1st division | Adam Scott O'Bryan |
| 24th Circuit, 2nd division | John Kevin Holbrook |
| 24th District, 1st division | John T. Chaffin |
| 24th District, 2nd division | D. Brett Butcher |

== Communities ==
=== Cities ===
- Louisa (county seat)

=== Unincorporated communities ===
- Blaine (former city)
- Buchanan
- Chapman
- Cherryville
- Fallsburg
- Kise
- Mazie
- Ulysses
- Lowmansville
- Webbville
- Zelda

== See also ==
- Lawrence County High School
- Dry counties
- National Register of Historic Places listings in Lawrence County, Kentucky
- Purgatory (Tyler Childers album)
