= Louisa, Kentucky =

- City
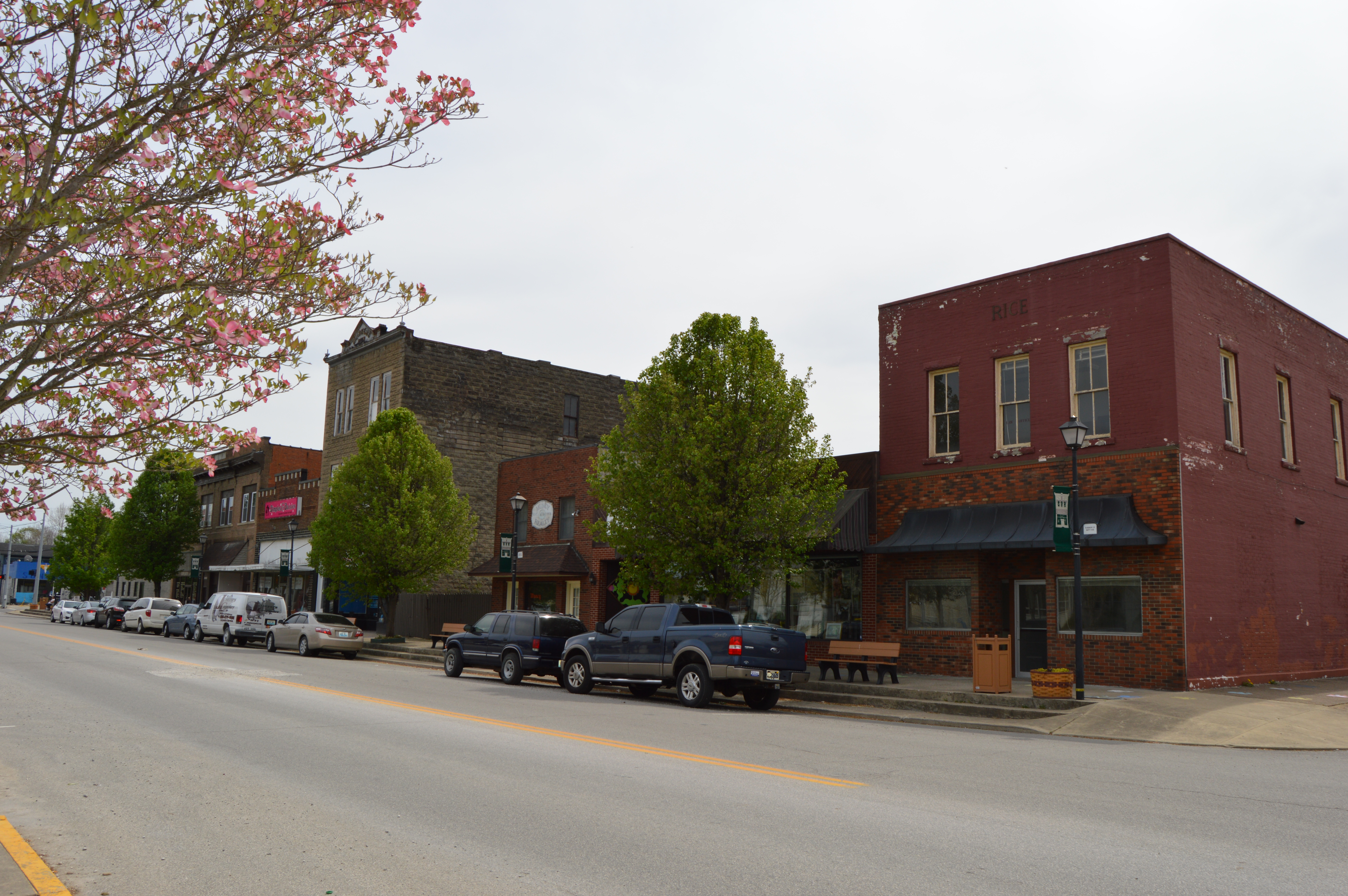
- Main Street
- Nickname: The Gem of the Mountains
- Location in Lawrence County, Kentucky

- Location within Kentucky Location within the United States
- Coordinates: 38°06′38″N 82°37′39″W
- Country: United States
- State: Kentucky
- County: Lawrence
- Established: December 11, 1822
- Incorporated: 1869

Government
  - Type: Mayor–council
  - Mayor: Harold Slone

Area
  - Total: 2.26 sq mi (5.86 km^{2})
  - Land: 2.24 sq mi (5.81 km^{2})
  - Water: 0.019 sq mi (0.05 km^{2})
- Elevation: 607 ft (185 m)

Population (2020)
  - Total: 2,679
  - Estimate (2022): 2,623
  - Density: 1,194.8/sq mi (461.31/km^{2})
- Time zone: UTC-5 (Eastern (EST))
  - Summer (DST): UTC-4 (EDT)
- ZIP codes: 41201, 41230
- Area code: 606
- FIPS code: 21-47854
- GNIS feature ID: 2404959
- Website: www.cityoflouisa.org

Louisa is a home-rule class city in Lawrence County, Kentucky, United States, of which it is the county seat. It is at the merger of the Levisa and Tug Forks into the Big Sandy River, which forms part of the state's border with West Virginia. The population was 2,679 at the 2020 census.

== History ==
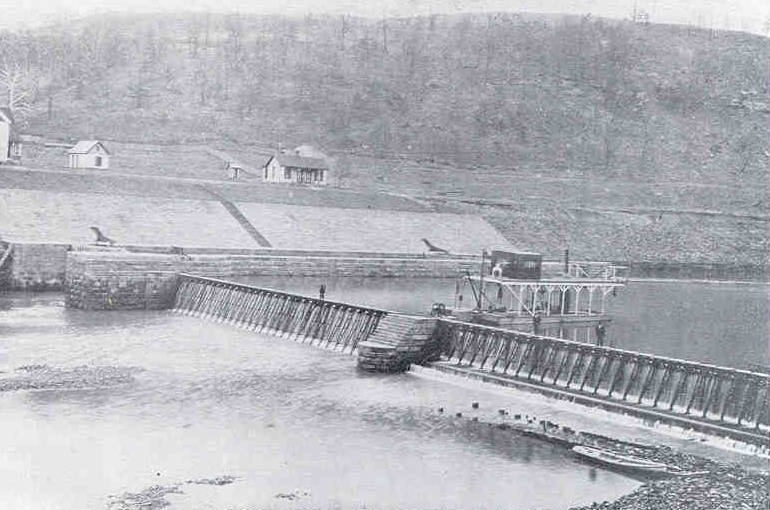
General view of the needle dam and lock as originally built in 1896 at Louisa

The origin of the city's name is unclear. Theories include that it was named for Louisa County, Virginia, after Louisa Swetnam, one of the first white children born in the area, or after a corruption of the original name of the Levisa Fork, as it was originally written and spoken as the "Louisa Fork." An 1856 map still shows the river under the name "Louisa." Virginia, Carolina and other English colonial-linked settlement attempts began as early as 1790 but did not take hold until 1818. Louisa became the county seat in 1822 and a city in 1823.

About 1792, Vancouver's Station, which had been destroyed by the Native Americans in 1790, on the tongue of land between the Levisa and Tug Forks of the Big Sandy, was reestablished. A few years later this settlement was known as "Balclutha" and is so designated on early maps of the state.

During the Civil War, Union troops under future president James A. Garfield occupied the city from December 1861 until the end of the war, despite several Confederate takeover attempts.

The Chattaroi Railroad (now a part of CSX) connected to Louisa in 1881. The city is also served by U.S. Route 23. The first needle dam constructed in the United States was completed just north of town in 1896. The Big Sandy News, headquartered in Louisa, profiled the town in March 1888.

Having suffered during the opioid crisis, Louisa became a center for recovery and rehabilitation in the 21st century.

== Geography ==
Louisa's eastern border is the Levisa Fork, and its northern border is the Big Sandy River, which also serves as the Kentucky–West Virginia border.

U.S. Route 23 passes through the western side of the city, leading north 30 miles (48 km) down the valley of the Big Sandy River to Ashland on the Ohio River and southwest 28 miles (45 km) to Staffordsville. Kentucky Route 3 passes through the center of Louisa on Madison Street; KY 3 leads northwest 7 miles (11 km) to Fallsburg and southeast up the valley of the Tug Fork and Rockcastle Creek 25 miles (40 km) to Inez. Kentucky Route 32 leads southwest from Louisa 18 miles (29 km) to Blaine. West Virginia Route 37 leads east across the Tug Fork to Fort Gay, West Virginia.

According to the United States Census Bureau, Louisa has a total area of 2.3 square miles (5.9 km^{2}), of which 0.02 square miles (0.05 km^{2}), or 0.81%, are water.

=== Climate ===
The climate in this area is characterized by relatively high temperatures and evenly distributed precipitation throughout the year. According to the Köppen Climate Classification system, Louisa has a Humid subtropical climate, abbreviated "Cfa" on climate maps.

== Demographics ==
Historical population
Census	Pop.	Note	%±
1830	87		—
1860	258		—
1870	425		64.7%
1880	496		16.7%
1890	834		68.1%
1900	1,099		31.8%
1910	1,356		23.4%
1920	2,011		48.3%
1930	1,931		−4.0%
1940	2,023		4.8%
1950	2,015		−0.4%
1960	2,071		2.8%
1970	1,781		−14.0%
1980	1,832		2.9%
1990	1,990		8.6%
2000	2,018		1.4%
2010	2,467		22.2%
2020	2,679		8.6%
2022 (est.)	2,623		−2.1%
U.S. Decennial Census

=== 2020 census ===
As of the 2020 census, Louisa had a population of 2,679. The median age was 39.9 years. 22.2% of residents were under the age of 18 and 17.8% of residents were 65 years of age or older. For every 100 females there were 88.5 males, and for every 100 females age 18 and over there were 86.2 males age 18 and over.

99.3% of residents lived in urban areas, while 0.7% lived in rural areas.

There were 1,100 households in Louisa, of which 30.8% had children under the age of 18 living in them. Of all households, 36.6% were married-couple households, 19.5% were households with a male householder and no spouse or partner present, and 36.6% were households with a female householder and no spouse or partner present. About 33.8% of all households were made up of individuals and 13.5% had someone living alone who was 65 years of age or older.

There were 1,229 housing units, of which 10.5% were vacant. The homeowner vacancy rate was 1.8% and the rental vacancy rate was 9.4%.

Racial composition as of the 2020 census
Race	Number	Percent
White	2,579	96.3%
Black or African American	18	0.7%
American Indian and Alaska Native	1	0.0%
Asian	2	0.1%
Native Hawaiian and Other Pacific Islander	0	0.0%
Some other race	18	0.7%
Two or more races	61	2.3%
Hispanic or Latino (of any race)	43	1.6%

=== 2000 census ===
As of the 2000 census, there were 2,018 people, 927 households, and 548 families residing in the city. The population density was 1,496.2 inhabitants per square mile (577.7/km^{2}). There were 1,065 housing units at an average density of 789.6 per square mile (304.9/km^{2}). The racial makeup of the city was 98.61% White, 0.50% African American, 0.05% Native American, 0.10% Asian, 0.05% from other races, and 0.69% from two or more races. Hispanic or Latino of any race were 0.20% of the population.

There were 927 households, out of which 26.5% had children under the age of 18 living with them, 41.3% were married couples living together, 15.2% had a female householder with no husband present, and 40.8% were non-families. 38.1% of all households were made up of individuals, and 18.4% had someone living alone who was 65 years of age or older. The average household size was 2.16 and the average family size was 2.84.

In the city, the population was spread out, with 22.1% under the age of 18, 10.0% from 18 to 24, 25.9% from 25 to 44, 23.9% from 45 to 64, and 18.1% who were 65 years of age or older. The median age was 39 years. For every 100 females, there were 79.5 males. For every 100 females age 18 and over, there were 74.1 males.

The median income for a household in the city was $16,690, and the median income for a family was $24,474. Males had a median income of $30,000 versus $21,250 for females. The per capita income for the city was $16,746. About 27.5% of families and 32.8% of the population were below the poverty line, including 46.9% of those under age 18 and 17.4% of those age 65 or over.

== Arts and culture ==
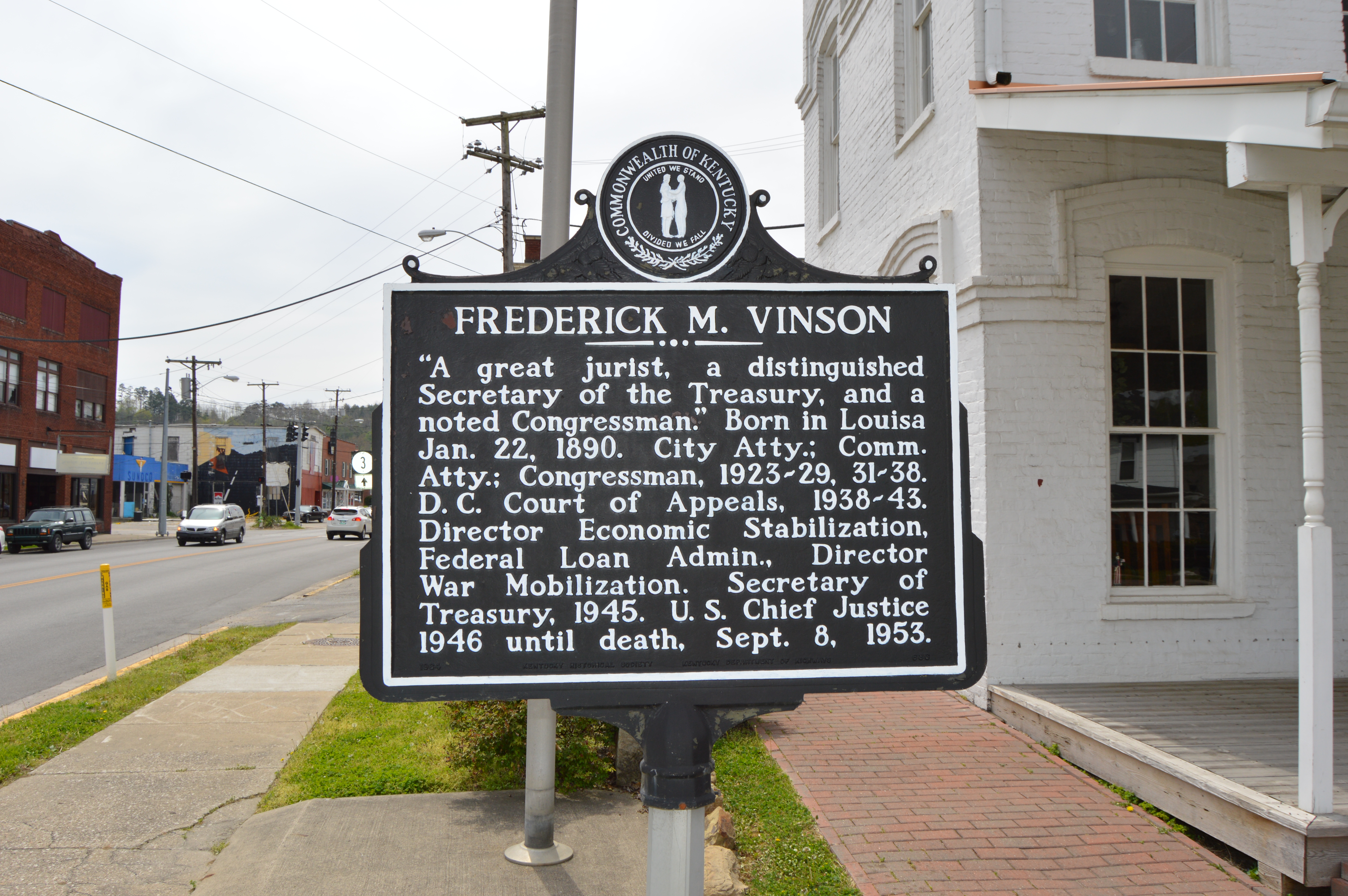
Historical marker in front of the Fred M. Vinson Birthplace, located on the western corner of the junction of Madison Street and Vinson Avenue.

Every second weekend in September, Louisa hosts the regional Septemberfest that features several local and national acts performing for three days, as well as arts and crafts on the northwestern side of town, and the many food vendors featuring Southeastern cuisine. Past artists have included Tyler Childers, Ricky Skaggs and others.

The bridge from Louisa to Fort Gay, West Virginia, is a rare multi-way T-bridge. The quarter-mile concrete span crosses two forks of the Big Sandy River, connects two states, and has a right turn at its halfway point to connect traffic to the Point Section neighborhood of Louisa. The current concrete and steel structure was constructed in 1979 and retrofitted in 2003.

"The Pavilion" (or "The Birdhouse") is a five-story tall spire structure that serves as a gas station, rest stop, and a country music museum along U.S. Route 23 as it passes through the western side of the city. The structure was inspired by the Hotel del Coronado in San Diego, California, and the Disney's Grand Floridian Resort & Spa in Orlando, Florida.

The Fred M. Vinson Birthplace is the historical boyhood home of the 13th Chief Justice of the United States, and the first jail to be built in Lawrence County. It is located on the corner of Madison St. and Vinson Ave. The grave of Chief Justice Vinson can also be found at Pinehill Cemetery.

== Education ==
=== Secondary schools ===
- Lawrence County High School

=== Primary schools ===
- Louisa East Elementary School
- Louisa West Elementary School
- Louisa Middle School
- The Millard School

=== Public library ===
Louisa has a lending library, the Lawrence County Public Library.

== Notable people ==
- Tyler Childers, country singer
- Cliff Fannin, baseball player
- James A. Hughes, U.S. representative from West Virginia
- Jason Michael, NFL coach
- John McConnell Rice, U.S. representative from Kentucky
- Chandler Shepherd (born 1992), baseball pitcher
- Noah Thompson, 2022 American Idol winner
- Fred M. Vinson, chief justice of the United States
- George and Leslie York, country music performers
