= Timeline of Louisville, Kentucky =

The following is a timeline of the history of the city of Louisville, Kentucky, USA.

== Prior to 19th century ==
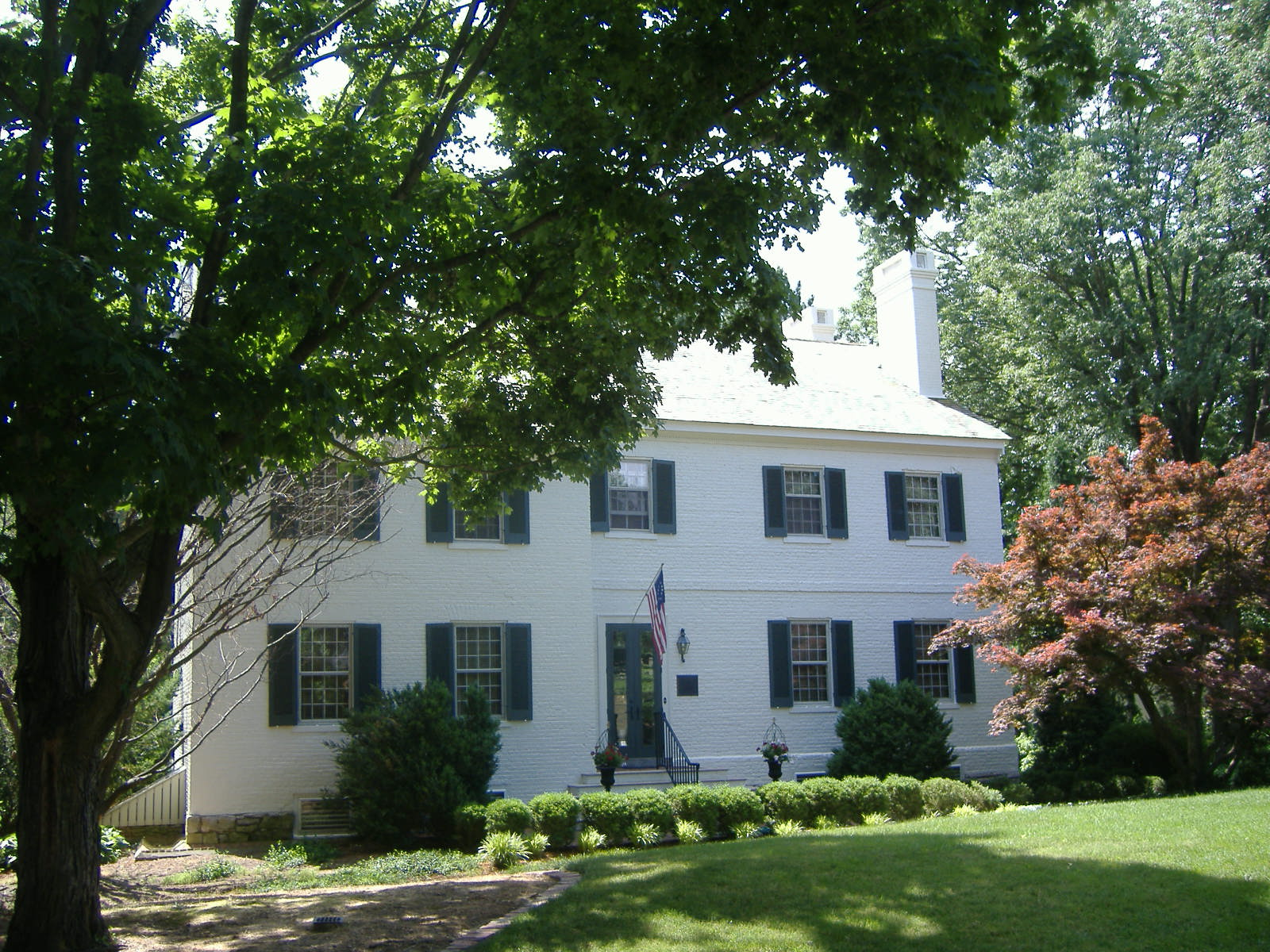
Childhood home of Zachary Taylor

- 1773 – Captain Thomas Bullitt surveys the land.
- 1778
  - George Rogers Clark settles on Corn Island.
  - Fort-on-Shore constructed
- 1780
  - Louisville chartered.
  - Jefferson County established with Louisville as seat
- 1781 – Fort Nelson (Kentucky) constructed
- 1790s – Zachary Taylor, 12th US president, spent his childhood in Louisville.
- 1798 – Jefferson Seminary chartered.

== 19th century ==
- 1800 – Population: 359
- 1807 – Louisville Gazette newspaper begins publication.
- 1808/12 – John James Audubon, ornithologist, naturalist and painter lived locally.
- 1813 – University of Louisville opened.
- 1820 – Population: 4,012.
- 1828
  - Louisville chartered as a city.
  - John Bucklin becomes mayor.
- 1829
  - Lewis Pottery Company incorporated.
  - Dover's Pottery in business.
- 1830
  - Louisville Daily Journal newspaper begins publication.
  - Louisville and Portland Canal opens.
  - Population: 10,341.
- 1831 – Louisville Lyceum established.
- 1837 – Louisville Medical Institute founded.
- 1838 – Louisville Gas and Water established.
- 1839 – Kentucky Institution for the Education of the Blind founded.
- 1840
  - Belknap Hardware and Manufacturing Company began on the banks of the Ohio River.
  - Louisville Collegiate Institute founded.
  - Franklin Lyceum founded.
- 1841
  - Louisville Law Library in operation.
  - Roman Catholic Archdiocese of Louisville established.
- 1842
  - Jefferson County Courthouse opens.
  - Mercantile Library Association founded.
- 1844 – Louisville Morning Courier newspaper begins publication.
- 1846 – University of Louisville formed.
- 1848 – Cave Hill Cemetery dedicated.
- 1850
  - Louisville and Nashville Railroad begins operating.
  - Kentucky Glass Works in business.
- 1851 – German Protestant Orphan's Home founded.
- 1852 – Louisville and Frankfort Railroad completed.
- 1855 – Bloody Monday anti-immigrant rioting fed by the Know Nothing Party.
- 1859 – J. F. Hillerich in business.
- 1860 – Population: 71,832.
- 1862 – Board of Trade organized.
- 1860s – Mary Anderson theatre actress, brought up locally.
- 1868 – The Courier-Journal newspaper begins publication.
- 1870 – Fourteenth Street Bridge opens.
- 1872 – Industrial Exposition.
- 1874 – Louisville Jockey Club and Driving Park Association formed.
- 1875 – Kentucky Derby begins; Churchill Downs opens.
- 1876 – Polytechnic Society of Kentucky organized.
- 1877 – Southern Baptist Theological Seminary relocates to Louisville.
- 1879 – Kaufman-Straus department store opens.
- 1880 – Population: 123,758.
- 1882 – Louisville Eclipse baseball team formed.
- 1883 – Southern Exposition begins.
- 1884
  - Filson Club founded.
  - The Louisville Times newspaper begins publication.
  - Chestnut Street Baptist Church built.
- 1886 – Kentucky & Indiana Terminal Bridge opens.
- 1888 – Louisville Camera Club formed.
- 1889 – Union Station built.
- 1890
  - Columbia Building constructed.
  - Tornado.
  - Population: 161,129.
- 1893
  - Song "Good Morning to All" first published by Louisville sisters Patty and Mildred J. Hill; was to become "Happy Birthday to You"
  - Southern Parkway opens.
- 1894 – St. Peter's German Evangelical Church built.
- 1895 – Big Four Bridge opens.
- 1897 – Louisville Business Women's Club founded.
- 1900
  - Louisville Bar Association established.
  - Jennie Benedict opens catering business.
  - Population: 204,731.

== 20th century ==
=== 1901–1959 ===
- 1902 – Louisville Public Library created.
- 1905
  - Louisville Free Public Library, Western Colored Branch opens.
  - Louisville Gardens opens.
  - Jefferson School of Law opens.
  - Fontaine Ferry Park (amusement park) opens.
- 1907 – The annual Kentucky State Fair moves permanently to Louisville.
- 1908 – Louisville Free Public Library main branch opens.
- 1910
  - Snead Manufacturing Building constructed.
  - Waverly Hills Sanatorium opens.
  - Population: 223,928.
- 1920 – Population: 234,891.
- 1921
  - Bowman airfield opens
  - Legal Aid Society of Louisville and Urban League branch established
  - Junior League of Louisville founded
- 1922 – WHAS radio begins broadcasting
- 1923
  - Brown Hotel opened
  - Chickasaw Park laid out (approximate date)
- 1925 – The Courier-Journal organizes the first National Spelling Bee, taking place in Washington, D.C.
- 1926
  - Brown Hotel chef Fred Schmidt introduces the Hot Brown sandwich
  - Zachary Taylor National Cemetery created by the Taylor family
- 1929 – Louisville Municipal Bridge opens.
- 1930
  - Masonic Temple built
  - Population: 307,745
- 1932 – U.S. Post Office, Court House and Custom House built.
- 1933 – WAVE radio begins broadcasting.
- 1937
  - Louisville Orchestra is founded.
  - Ohio River flood.
- 1941 – Standiford Field airport built.
- 1946 – Jefferson County Memorial Forest inaugurated.
- 1947 – Standiford Field opens for commercial flights.
- 1948 – WAVE-TV (television) begins broadcasting.
- 1949 – Carriage House Players active.
- 1950
  - Bellarmine College opens.
  - WHAS-TV (television) begins broadcasting.
- 1952 – Big Spring Country Club hosted the annual PGA Championship; Jim Turnesa won the event.
- 1954 – The annual WHAS Crusade for Children telethon begins.
- 1956
  - Freedom Hall opened on the Kentucky Fairgrounds.
  - Kentucky Derby Festival begins as two weeks preceding the first Saturday in May, the day of the Kentucky Derby.
- 1957 – St. James Court Art Show held its first annual arts and craft show in the Old Louisville neighborhood.
- 1958 – Freedom Hall hosted the 1958 NCAA Men's Basketball National Championship; University of Kentucky won the National Championship.
- 1959 – Freedom Hall hosted the 1959 NCAA Men's Basketball National Championship; University of California-Berkeley won the National Championship.

=== 1960–2000 ===
- 1962
  - Sherman Minton Bridge opened.
  - Mid-City Mall opened.
  - Freedom Hall hosted the 1962 NCAA Men's Basketball National Championship; University of Cincinnati won the National Championship.
  - Southeast Christian Church, now one of the country's largest Protestant churches, holds its first services.
- 1963
  - John F. Kennedy Memorial Bridge opened.
  - Freedom Hall hosted the 1963 NCAA Men's Basketball National Championship; Loyola–Chicago won the National Championship.
- 1964
  - Kennedy Interchange (Spaghetti Junction) opened.
  - Actors Theatre of Louisville opened.
- 1965
  - Louisville and Jefferson County Riverport Authority established as a public agency.
  - Republican Kenneth A. Schmied was elected mayor; he was the last Republican to be elected mayor.
- 1967
  - Kentucky Colonels basketball team founded.
  - Freedom Hall hosted the 1967 NCAA Men's Basketball National Championship; UCLA won the National Championship.
- 1968
  - The previously all-male Bellarmine College becomes coeducational when the all-female Ursuline College merges into it.
- 1969
  - Louisville Zoo opens as "State Zoo of Kentucky".
  - Freedom Hall hosted the 1969 NCAA Men's Basketball National Championship; UCLA won the National Championship.
  - Democrat Frank W. Burke was elected mayor.
- 1971 – Romano Mazzoli becomes U.S. representative for Kentucky's 3rd congressional district.
- 1973
  - Democrat Harvey I. Sloane was elected mayor for the first time.
  - Eventual Triple Crown winner Secretariat ran the fastest time ever at the annual Kentucky Derby.
- 1974
  - Tornado occurs in the east end of Louisville.
  - Actors Theatre of Louisville opened is designated the "State Theater of Kentucky"
  - TARC began operating as the city bus line in 1974.
- 1977
  - Foreign trade zone established for the Riverport Authority.
  - Democrat William B. Stansbury was elected mayor.
- 1978 – Kentucky State Data Center headquartered in Louisville
- 1981 – Sewer explosions occur in the center of the city.
- 1982 – Democrat Harvey I. Sloane was elected mayor for the second time.
- 1986 – Democrat Jerry Abramson was elected mayor for the first time.
- 1987
  - Kentucky Kingdom amusement park opened at the Kentucky Exposition Center.
  - The Courier-Journal was purchased by media giant Gannett.
- 1988 – Louisville Motor Speedway opened.
- 1989 – A mass shooting at Standard Gravure occurs; it was the deadliest of such in Kentucky's history.
- 1990
  - Thunder Over Louisville has its first annual event and becomes the first event of the annual Kentucky Derby Festival.
  - Population: 269,063.
- 1993 – AEGON Center is completed and becomes the tallest building in Kentucky.
- 1995 – Standiford Field is renamed to Louisville International Airport.
- 1996 – Louisville Slugger Museum opened in Downtown Louisville.
- 1998 – Southeast Christian Church opened a new 9,000-seat worship center on Blankenbaker Parkway in Middletown. The facility has since been joined by five satellite worship centers in the Louisville area.
- 1999
  - Louisville Waterfront Park dedicated.
  - Democrat David L. Armstrong was elected mayor.
- 2000
  - Louisville Slugger Field opened for the newly renamed Louisville Bats, who became a minor league affiliate for the Cincinnati Reds the same year.
  - Valhalla Golf Club hosts the annual PGA Championship, Tiger Woods won the competition.
  - City website online (approximate date).

== 21st century ==
- 2001 – Louisville Bats win the Governors' Cup, AAA Championship
- 2002
  - Louisville Extreme Park opens.
  - Valley Sports wins the 2002 Little League World Series.
  - Forecastle Festival begins its annual music festival.
- 2003
  - City–county merger increases Louisville's total population to near one-million.
  - Democrat Jerry Abramson is elected mayor for the second time.
- 2004
  - Fourth Street Live opened as entertainment complex/venue in downtown Louisville.
  - Valhalla Golf Club hosted the annual Senior PGA Championship, won by Hale Irwin.
- 2005
  - Muhammad Ali Center opens as a tribute to the champion boxer Muhammad Ali.
  - The annual Abbey Road on the River is held in Louisville for the first time.
  - The Louisville Cardinals join the Big East Conference.
  - Jim Patterson Stadium opens as the new home of Louisville Cardinals baseball.
- 2006 – Churchill Downs hosted the annual Breeders' Cup.
- 2007
  - The Louisville Cardinals competed in their first BCS game by defeating Wake Forest in the Orange Bowl.
  - The Cardinals made their first appearance in the College World Series, the eight-team finals of the NCAA Division I baseball tournament.
  - Thunder Over Louisville sets record crowd of over 800,000 people.'
  - John Yarmuth becomes U.S. representative for Kentucky's 3rd congressional district.
- 2008 – Valhalla Golf Club hosted the biennial Ryder Cup, won by the United States.
- 2009
  - McAlpine Locks and Dam are expanded.
  - Widely publicized extortion trial between University of Louisville men's basketball coach Rick Pitino and Karen Sypher occurred.
  - Dedication ceremony held for Lincoln Memorial at Waterfront Park.
- 2010
  - 2010 US Census Population: 602,011.
  - Six Flags Kentucky Kingdom closed due to the rejection of an amended lease by the Kentucky State Fair Board.
  - KFC Yum! Center opened as Louisville's new downtown multi-use arena.
  - Churchill Downs hosted the annual Breeders' Cup.
- 2011
  - Democrat Greg Fischer is elected mayor after Jerry Abramson becomes Lieutenant Governor of Kentucky
  - Valhalla Golf Club hosted the annual Senior PGA Championship, won by Tom Watson.
  - Sherman Minton Bridge temporarily closed in September after construction crews found cracks in the main load-bearing structural element.
  - Churchill Downs hosts the annual Breeders Cup.
- 2012
  - Sherman Minton Bridge reopened in February after months of repairs.
  - The KFC Yum! Center hosted second and third-round games of the 2012 NCAA men's basketball tournament.
- 2013
  - The Big Four Bridge partially opened as a converted pedestrian walkway from Louisville into Jeffersonville, Indiana, although the complete crossing would not reopen until the Indiana connection was completed in May 2014.
  - The Louisville Cardinals won their third men's basketball NCAA Championship. The title would later be vacated due to NCAA rules violations (see 2015, 2017, and 2018).
  - The Cardinals competed in their second BCS game, defeating Florida in the Sugar Bowl.
  - The Cardinals also competed in their second College World Series.
- 2014
  - Kentucky Kingdom reopened as Louisville's theme park.
  - Valhalla Golf Club hosted the annual PGA Championship; Rory McIlroy won the competition.
  - Mayor Fischer is re-elected in November.
  - Construction of the Ohio River Bridges Project begins.
  - The Louisville Cardinals played in their second consecutive College World Series and third overall.
  - Shortly after the College World Series appearance, the Cardinals joined the Atlantic Coast Conference.
- 2015
  - The KFC Yum! Center hosted second and third-round games of the 2015 NCAA men's basketball tournament.
  - The Abraham Lincoln Bridge (part of the Ohio River Bridges Project) opened for public use.
  - Katina Powell, a self-described former madam, published a book in which she alleged that Louisville Cardinals men's basketball staffer Andre McGee had paid her $10,000 from 2010 to 2014 to provide strippers and prostitutes for players and recruits. The NCAA soon launched an investigation into the Louisville program.
- 2016
  - Speed Art Museum reopened after a 3 1/2-year, $60 million expansion project.
  - Death of Muhammad Ali, his globally televised funeral procession, and private interment at Cave Hill Cemetery.
  - Lewis and Clark Bridge opens in the East End of Louisville.
  - Louisville City FC began play in the United Soccer League.
  - Louisville Cardinals quarterback Lamar Jackson became the Cardinals' first Heisman Trophy winner as the top player in college football for 2016.
- 2017
  - The Louisville Cardinals played in their fourth College World Series. Additionally, Cardinals pitcher and first baseman Brendan McKay was named the consensus college baseball player of the year for 2017.
  - The NCAA announced sanctions against the Louisville men's basketball program stemming from the 2015 sex scandal. The most significant were scholarship restrictions, a six-game suspension for head coach Rick Pitino, a 10-year show-cause penalty for Andre McGee (who by that time had left the program), and the vacating of 123 wins over four seasons, including the 2013 national title. The school appealed the sanctions.
  - Louisville City won the USL championship.
  - U of L fired both Pitino and athletic director Tom Jurich in the wake of an FBI investigation into "pay-for-play" college recruiting schemes that allegedly linked Pitino to illicit payments to the family of at least one U of L recruit.
- 2018
  - The NCAA denied Louisville's appeal against the sanctions announced against the men's basketball program in 2017, officially making the Cardinals the first Division I school forced to vacate a men's or women's basketball championship.

== See also ==
- History of Louisville, Kentucky
- List of mayors of Louisville, Kentucky
- Timeline of Kentucky history
- Other cities in Kentucky:
  - Timeline of Lexington, Kentucky
  - Timeline of Newport, Kentucky

== Bibliography ==
=== Published in 19th century ===
- "Louisville", American Advertising Directory, for Manufacturers and Dealers in American Goods, New York: Jocelyn, Darling & Co., 1831, OCLC 1018684
- Louisville Directory for the year 1832. Louisville: Otis. 1832.. 1970 reprint
- Lewis Collins (1850), "Jefferson County", Historical sketches of Kentucky, Maysville, Kentucky: L. Collins
- Benjamin Casseday (1852), History of Louisville, Louisville: Hull and Brother, OCLC 2017121, OL 271589M
- Henry Tanner, ed. (1859). Louisville Directory and Business Advertiser. Louisville: Maxwell & Co.
- "Louisville". Commercial Gazetteer and Business Directory of the Ohio River. Indianapolis: G.W. Hawes. 1861.
- R. H. Long (1863), "Louisville", Hunt's Gazetteer of the Border and Southern States, Pittsburgh, PA: John P. Hunt
- "Ohio River: Louisville". James' River Guide ... Mississippi Valley. Cincinnati: U.P. James. 1871.
- "Louisville". Kentucky State Gazetteer and Business Directory. R.L. Polk & Co. 1876.
- Joseph Sabin, ed. (1878). "Louisville, Kentucky". Bibliotheca Americana. Vol. 10. New York. OCLC 13972268.
- History of the Ohio Falls Cities and their Counties, vol. 1, Cleveland, Ohio: L. A. Williams & Co., 1882
- Price, W.T. (1883). "Louisville" . Encyclopædia Britannica. Vol. 15 (9th ed.).
- J. Stoddard Johnston (1896), Memorial history of Louisville from its first settlement to the year 1896, Chicago: American Biographical Pub. Co., OCLC 3346757, OL 6968633M

=== Published in 20th century ===
- Courier-Journal Almanac for 1901. Louisville Courier-Journal Co. 1901.
- Directory of the City of Louisville for 1909. Louisville: Caron Directory Company. 1909. pp. 57 v. Archived from the original on January 31, 2024.
- "Louisville" . Encyclopædia Britannica. Vol. 17 (11th ed.). 1910. pp. 63–64.
- Federal Writers' Project (1939), "Louisville", Kentucky, American Guide Series, New York: Harcourt, Brace and Company, OCLC 498232 – via Internet Archive
- Federal Writers' Project (1940), Louisville: A Guide to Falls City, American Guide Series
- Ory Mazar Nergal, ed. (1980), "Louisville, Kentucky", Encyclopedia of American Cities, New York: E.P. Dutton, OL 4120668M
- George H. Yater (1987). Two Hundred Years at the Fall of the Ohio: A History of Louisville and Jefferson County (2nd ed.). Louisville, Kentucky: Filson Club, Incorporated. ISBN 0-9601072-3-1. (first edition published in 1979)
- George Thomas Kurian (1994), "Louisville, Kentucky", World Encyclopedia of Cities, vol. 1: North America, Santa Barbara, Calif.: ABC-CLIO, OL 1431653M, archived from the original on October 27, 2021 – via Internet Archive (fulltext)
- "The South: Kentucky: Louisville", USA, Let's Go, New York: St. Martin's Press, 1999, OL 24937240M

=== Published in 21st century ===
- John E. Kleber, ed. (2001). Encyclopedia of Louisville. University Press of Kentucky.
- Southern Foodways Alliance, University of Mississippi (2008), Louisville: Blue Grass and Brown Whiskey (bibliography), archived from the original on September 24, 2016
- Laura A. Reese and Raymond A. Rosenfeld, ed. (2012), "Civic culture and corporate regime in Louisville", Comparative Civic Culture: the Role of Local Culture in Urban Policy-Making, Burlington, Vermont: Ashgate, ISBN 9781409436546
