= Ed Hamilton =

American sculptor (born 1947)

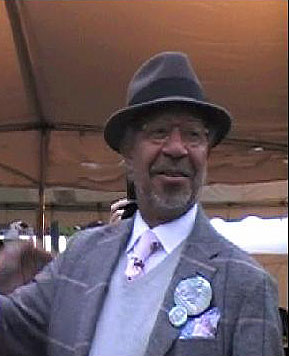
- Ed Hamilton at the June 2009 Abraham Lincoln Statue Dedication at Louisville Waterfront Park
- Born: Edward Norton Hamilton, Jr. February 14, 1947 (age 79); Cincinnati, Ohio
- Education: Barney Bright
- Known for: Sculpture
- Notable work: Spirit of Freedom
- Website: edhamiltonstudios.com

Edward Norton Hamilton Jr. (born February 14, 1947) is an American sculptor living in Louisville, Kentucky, who specializes in public art. His most famous work is The Spirit of Freedom, a memorial to black Civil War veterans, that stands in Washington, DC, in the Shaw neighborhood near Howard University. Hamilton has also created monuments dedicated to Booker T. Washington, Joe Louis, York (William Clark's manservant on the Lewis and Clark Expedition), and the slaves who revolted on La Amistad.

== Biography ==
Ed Hamilton was born in Cincinnati, Ohio and raised in Louisville by Amy Jane (Camp) and Edward Norton Hamilton Sr. He graduated from Shawnee High School (Kentucky) in 1965, then received a scholarship to Louisville's Art Center, where he studied sculpture and painting. He graduated from the Louisville School of Art in 1969 and also studied at Spalding University, then started his teaching career in 1973 at Iroquois High School.

Hamilton, originally a painter, had a chance meeting with Barney Bright – the sculptor responsible for the Derby Clock and the River Horse statue – that changed Hamilton's life. Bright made Hamilton his apprentice, giving him a place to work and the opportunity to learn sculpting. Since learning under Barney Bright, Hamilton has taught sculpture at Jefferson Community College and is a member of the Alpha Phi Alpha fraternity.

On December 16, 2004, Hamilton received a Doctor of Arts honorary Degree from the University of Louisville. Two days later, December 18, 2004, Hamilton received an Honorary Doctor of Arts Degree from Western Kentucky University.

In 2006, Hamilton self-published an autobiography, The Birth of An Artist: a journey of discovery, in which he talked about his work and the creative process. The book was a popular feature of the Kentucky Book Fair in 2007. While working on the book, Hamilton, at age 57, discovered that he was adopted.

In June 2009, Hamilton completed work on the memorial statue of Abraham Lincoln which is located near the base of the Big Four Bridge at the Waterfront Park in Louisville, Kentucky.

== Selected works ==
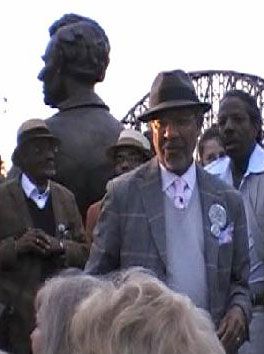
Hamilton, standing by his Lincoln statue (2009), Louisville, Kentucky

- Booker T. Washington (1983–84), Hampton University, Hampton, Virginia.
- Joe Louis (1984–87), Cobo Center, Detroit, Michigan.
- La Amistad Memorial (1990–92), City Hall, New Haven, Connecticut.
- The Spirit of Freedom (1992–98), African American Civil War Memorial, 10th & U Streets NW, Washington, DC.
- York (2003), Riverfront Plaza/Belvedere, Louisville, Kentucky.
- Abraham Lincoln (2009), Waterfront Park, Louisville, Kentucky.

== See also ==
- List of people from the Louisville metropolitan area
