= Louisville Falls Fountain =

Defunct fountain in Louisville, Kentucky

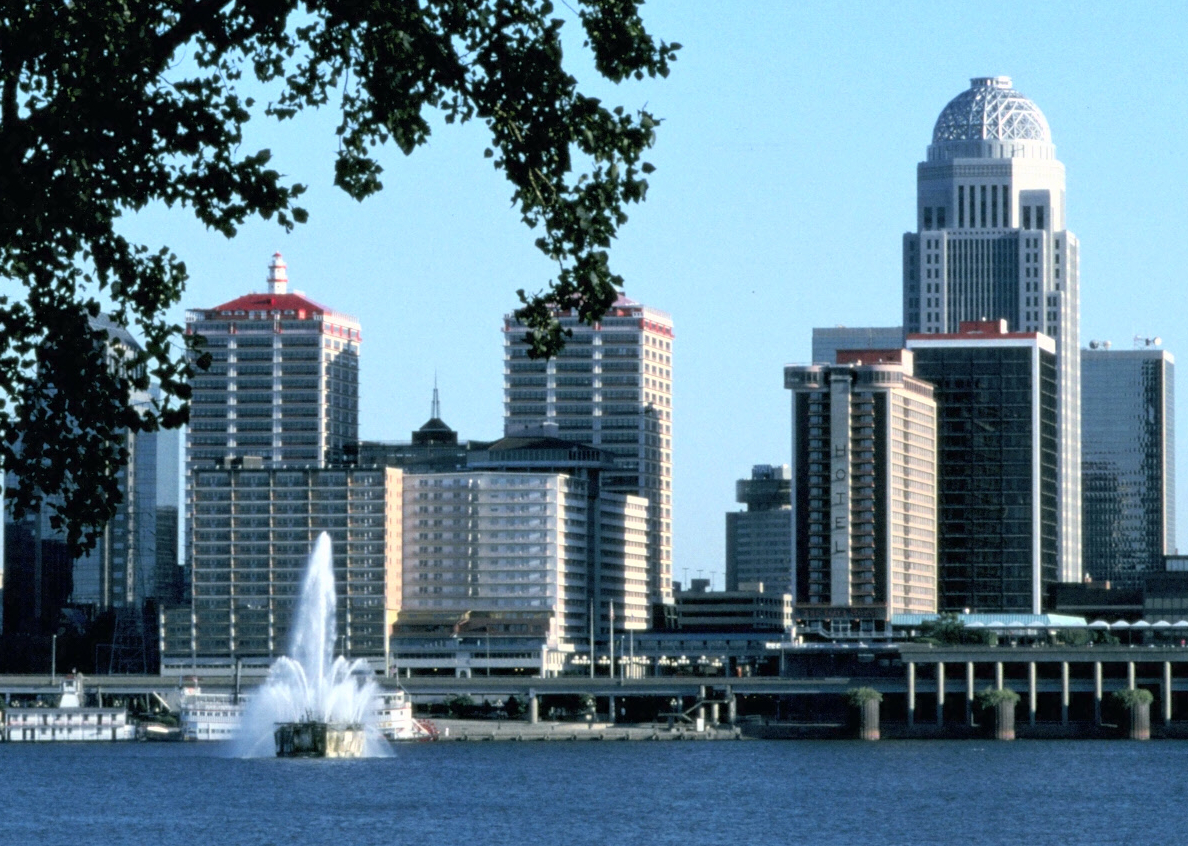
Louisville Falls Fountain as seen from Clarksville, Indiana, looking toward downtown Louisville, in 1993

The Louisville Falls Fountain was a fountain that floated in the Ohio River off the shore of downtown Louisville, intended to be a major tourist attraction for Louisville, Kentucky. Purported to be the tallest floating fountain in the world, it spouted 15,800 gallons of water per minute upward in the shape of a fleur-de-lis.

The fountain, lit by colored lights, was operated from Memorial Day through Thanksgiving every day from morning through midnight, and stored during the winter in Utica, Indiana. When operating, it was visible from Belle of Louisville steamboat cruises, the Belvedere and nearby parts of downtown Louisville, as well as the Southern Indiana riverfront at Jeffersonville and Clarksville.

The fountain operated from 1988 to 1998, when it broke down after an explosion and was shut down.

== History ==
The Louisville Falls Fountain was dedicated August 19, 1988, four days after the death of its benefactor, Barry Bingham Sr. who, along with his wife, Mary Caperton Bingham, had donated $2.6 million towards the project and future upkeep. The octagonally-shaped, computer-controlled fountain was located near the mooring of the Belle of Louisville, just west of the George Rogers Clark Memorial Bridge. The Binghams were inspired by the Jet d'Eau fountain in Geneva, Switzerland, and they, along with then-Governor of Kentucky Wallace Wilkinson, hoped a fountain in Louisville would become a symbol for the city on par with the Gateway Arch in St. Louis.

Costs were higher than expected, and the fountain malfunctioned several times, quickly depleting the maintenance fund. Maintenance was eventually taken over by the Louisville Water Company. It initially shot water to a height of 420 feet, though to lower operation costs this was eventually lowered by the water company to 375 feet.

On September 27, 1998, the fountain's central pump exploded leading to a total breakdown, as reported by then-Mayor Jerry Abramson a few days later. Due to the expenses involved in repairing the fountain, the city decided to keep it shut down and subsequently sold it for scrap. As of 2019, the fountain was still floating and tethered to a barge on the Ohio River adjacent to New Albany, Indiana, yet to be dismantled.

== See also ==
- Louisville Waterfront Park
- List of attractions and events in the Louisville metropolitan area
- History of Louisville, Kentucky
