= Forecastle Festival =

Music festival in Louisville, Kentucky, United States

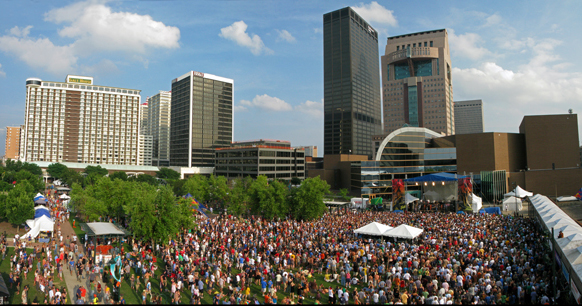
- Forecastle Festival in 2009
- Genre: Variety
- Locations: Louisville Waterfront Park; Louisville, Kentucky
- Years active: 2002–2019, 2022
- Founders: JK McKnight
- Website: forecastlefest.com

The Forecastle Festival (pronounced "fore-castle") is a three-day music, art, and activism festival held annually in Louisville, Kentucky. The festival was founded in 2002 as a small gathering of local musicians in Tyler Park, and steadily grew into an international attraction that now includes major touring acts and an economic impact of over $25 million per year. Forecastle was selected as one of Rolling Stone's "Coolest Festivals" and has an annual attendance of over 75,000 fans at Louisville Waterfront Park. It attracts attendees from nearly all 50 states, 2000 cities, and a dozen international countries. Past headliners include The Black Keys, Jack White, Jack Harlow, Beck, Outkast, LCD Soundsystem, Arcade Fire, Tame Impala, Tyler the Creator, Sam Smith, My Morning Jacket, Sturgill Simpson, Chris Stapleton, Alabama Shakes, the Flaming Lips, the Avett Brothers, Widespread Panic, Cage the Elephant and many more.

The festival has been paused since 2023 with no date set for its return.

== History ==
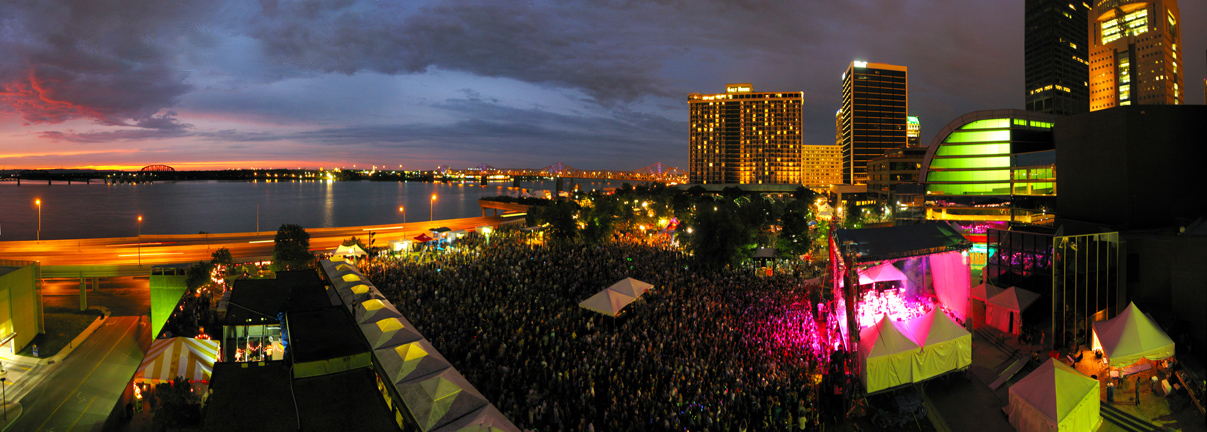
Forecastle 2009 - Sunset

Derived from the nautical, maritime term forecastle, but pronounced as if it were the words "fore" and "castle" joined, Forecastle began as a small, community event in 2002 by JK McKnight at Tyler Park in Louisville. Structured as an equal representation of music, arts, and activism, the event grew quickly and audience expanded regionally. To accommodate increasing crowds, the festival moved to Louisville's larger Cherokee Park in 2005, followed by The Mellwood Arts and Entertainment Center in 2006, Riverfront Plaza/Belvedere in 2007, and Louisville Waterfront Park in 2010. The festival's name, format, and concept were trademarked in 2007. Forecastle was named one of Outside Magazine's "Top 15 Festivals in the Country" in 2009.

AC Entertainment became a co-producer of Forecastle in 2011. Before the pandemic, the 2019 line-up (July 12–14) featured the Killers, high-energy folk rockers, the Avett Brothers and 2019 Grammy-winning hip-hop, funk and soul performers Anderson .Paak and the Free Nationals.

The festival was cancelled in 2020 and 2021 due to the COVID-19 pandemic and scheduled to return in 2022, with a move to late May on Memorial Day weekend. In November 2022, organizers announced that the festival would be "taking a pause" in 2023 to "strategize and determine the best path forward for the festival".

The 2022 lineup featured Jack Harlow, Tame Impala, Tyler the Creator, Phoebe Bridgers, Porter Robinson, Rufus Du Sol and many more. It drew a record attendance of more than 75,000 to Louisville's Waterfront Park. However, despite the attendance, Forecastle would elect to "take a pause" for 2023 with no announcement as of 2024 for its return.

== Music ==
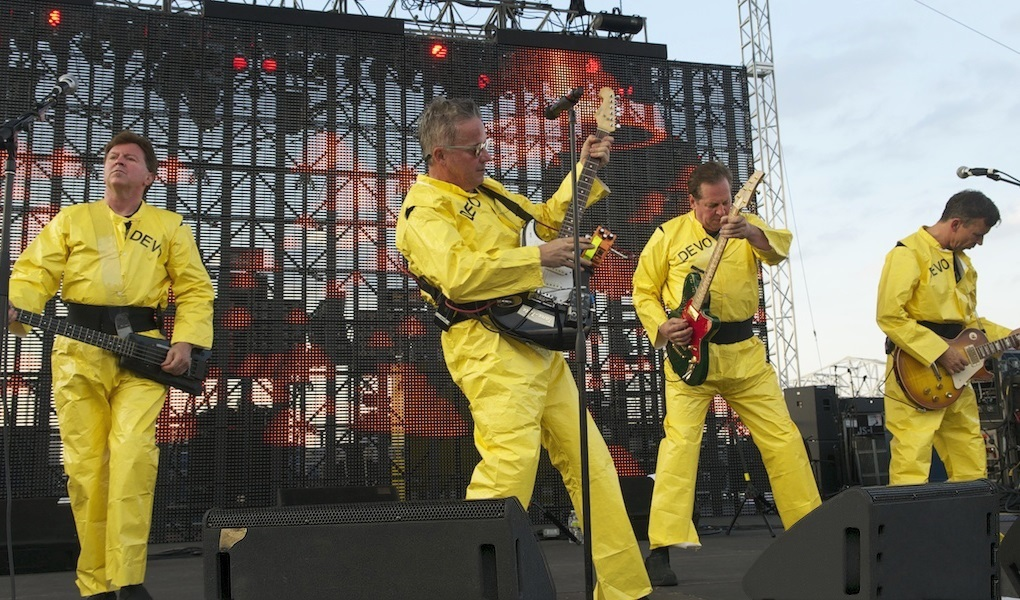
Devo at Forecastle 2010

Forecastle has showcased over 500 bands and a diverse number of musical genres, from rock to hip-hop, bluegrass to electronica. The event has multiple stages, all with maritime themes (Mast, Boom, Ocean, etc.). In addition to the headliners listed above, some previous musical guests include Cage the Elephant, Modest Mouse, Run the Jewels, Pretty Lights, Phantogram, Jim James, PJ Harvey, Band of Horses, Jason Isbell, Nathaniel Rateliff, Robert Plant, She & Him, Spoon, Vince Staples, A-Trak, Sleater-Kinney, Tortoise, Umphrey's McGee, The String Cheese Incident, The Black Crowes and Del the Funky Homosapien. The festival celebrated its 10th anniversary in 2012 with a collaboration with local musicians My Morning Jacket, who curated the event with festival organizers AC Entertainment and The Forecastle Festival. The lineup included such acts as Wilco, Girl Talk, Sleigh Bells, Beach House, Andrew Bird, Bassnectar, Neko Case, Houndmouth, Sleeper Agent (band), and many more. In more recent years, the festival's lineup has shifted primarily toward alternative rap and EDM.

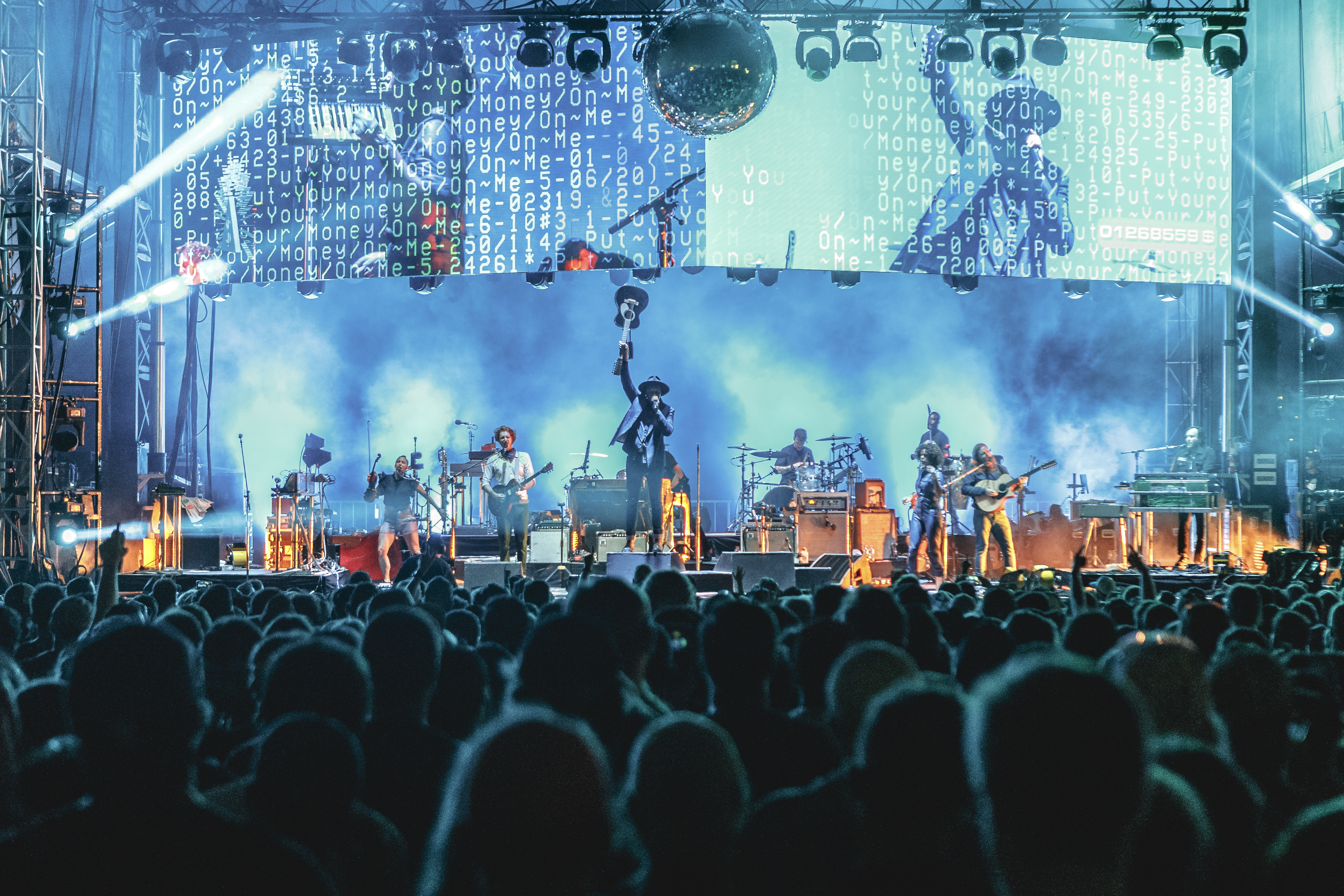
Arcade Fire at Forecastle 2018

== Art ==
Forecastle has featured over 150 artists contributing a variety of installation work, as well as 2-D, 3-D, and mixed media. Each year's exhibition is commonly centered on a theme of ecology and sustainability. Until 2012, a panel of local and regional curators designed the exhibition from artist submissions received from universities and community institutions across the south and midwest. Since 2012, the artistic theme of the festival has shifted more to the nautical name and nature of the festival experience.

== Activism ==
In 2011, Forecastle founder JK McKnight created The Forecastle Foundation - a 501(c)(3) environmental non-profit dedicated to "protecting and connecting the world's natural awesome". The organization focuses on global hot spots: the most critically threatened, biologically diverse habitats left on earth. Hot spots cover just 2.3% of the Earth's land surface, yet account for 77% of all vertebrate species and 50% of the world's plant life. As of 2018, the Forecastle Foundation has contributed over $500,000 to its partners, including The Guayaki Foundation, The Nature Conservancy (US and Asia), FCD Belize, Kentucky Natural Lands Trust, and more. It has showcased over 150 environmental non-profits and outdoor recreational organizations.

== The Bourbon Lodge ==
In 2012, Forecastle Festival partnered with The Kentucky Distillers Association to launch The Bourbon Lodge: a 120' ft facility styled as a combination of a turn-of-the-century rickhouse and a prohibition-era speakeasy, where patrons can sample bourbon from distilleries in the state. The Lodge hosts events such as fireside chats with master distillers, mixology sessions, and culinary pairings. In 2013, bourbon writer Fred Minnick called Forecastle "the most important bourbon venue in the country to reach new consumers". The Bourbon Lodge now partners with the Kentucky Bourbon Trail.

== The Gonzo Bar ==
In honor of Louisville native and Kentucky Bourbon aficionado Hunter S. Thompson, Forecastle visual designers constructed a bourbon bar in the late writer's memory. It debuted on Hunter's posthumous 77th birthday, which was the same weekend as Forecastle 2014.

== Lodging and camping ==
The "Official Hotel & Headquarters" for the festival is the Galt House, which is Louisville's only riverfront hotel and features 1,300 rooms. Other nearby options include 21c Museum Hotel, Courtyard Marriott, and Ramada Downtown. American Turners has been used as a campground the past three years. The riverfront property includes a bar, pool, showers, outdoor sports, and other amenities for campers. During the festival, a shuttle bus is usually provided to and from Forecastle Festival.

== Halfway to Forecastle ==
"Halfway to Forecastle" is an annual mini-fest hosted each January to celebrate the "halfway" point to the festival. The event typically benefits a charity or non-profit, with recipients including Surfrider Foundation, Kentucky Waterways Alliance, and many more. Previous headliners include Pretty Lights, Big Boi, RJD2 and Kid Sister.

== See also ==
- List of attractions and events in the Louisville metropolitan area
