= Riverfront Plaza/Belvedere =

Public area on the Ohio River in Downtown Louisville, Kentucky

Coordinates: 38°15′30″N 85°45′29″W

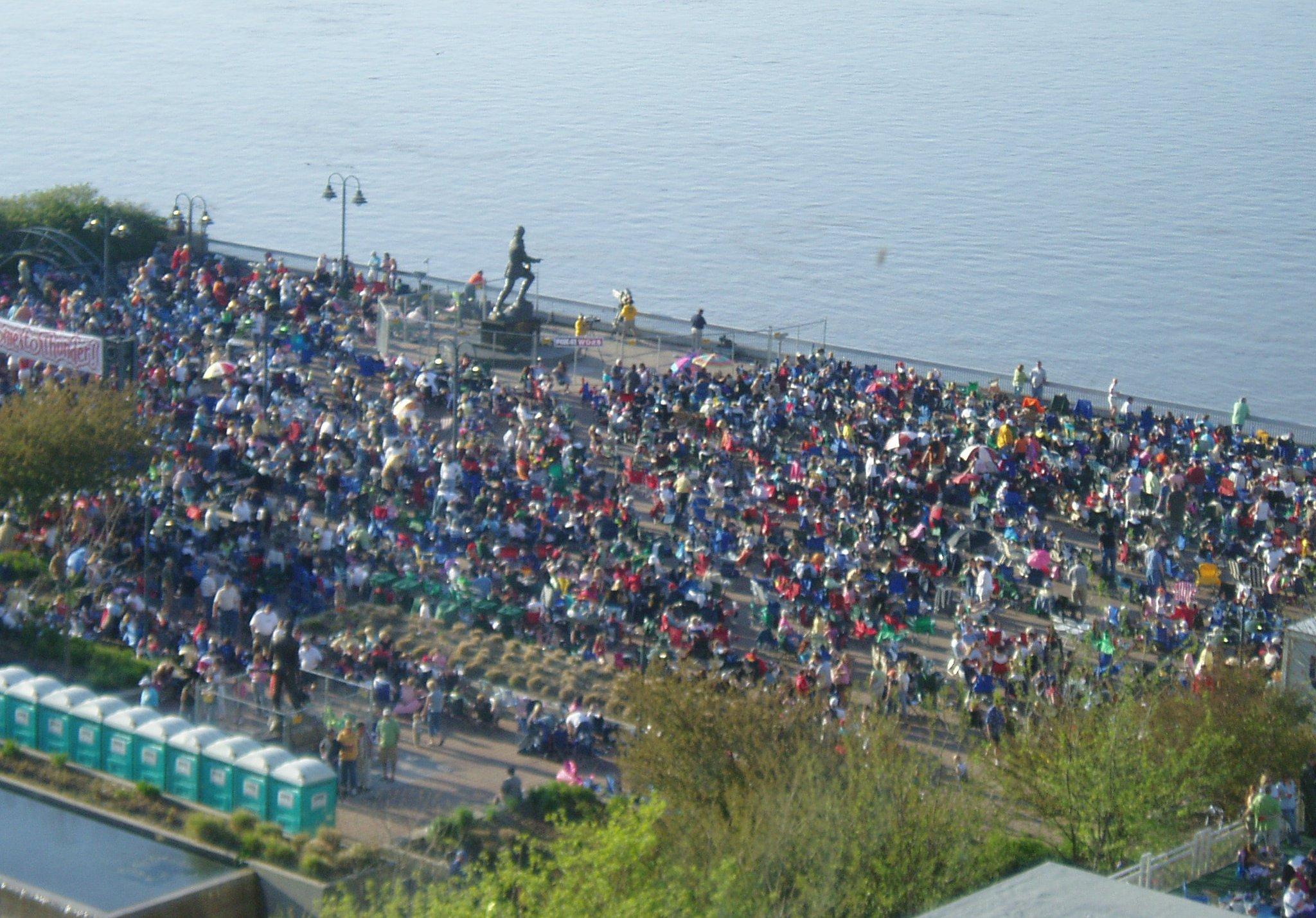
Crowds watching Thunder Over Louisville gather in the plaza

Riverfront Plaza/Belvedere is a public area on the Ohio River in Downtown Louisville, Kentucky. Although proposed as early as 1930, the project did not get off the ground until $13.5 million in funding was secured in 1969 to revitalize the downtown area (through which Interstate 64 had just been built). On April 27, 1973, the Riverfront Plaza/Belvedere was dedicated. Running between Third and Sixth streets, it consisted of a large parking garage and the interstate, and a grassy 7-acre (28,000 m^{2}) park built atop. The grassy park section on the western end was the Belvedere, and the Riverfront Plaza to the east included other attractions: fountains, shelters and an ice-skating rink, as well as buildings such as the Galt House, One Riverfront Plaza and the American Life Building.

The Galt House, as well as The Kentucky Center for the Performing Arts, are incorporated into the plaza with walkway access. It includes a glass elevator with access to three levels of the structure.

After several lawsuits alleging that corrosive materials had damaged cars in the parking garage, a $3.8 million renovation began in 1996. The above-ground portions were renovated in 1998 to provide a wider walkway to Fifth Street, as well as less visible concrete and a concert stage. The Belvedere is adjacent to Louisville Waterfront Park, which opened in the late 1990s, with stairs and an elevator leading down to the wharf between the two.

The plaza is the east terminus of the Louisville Riverwalk.

== Statues ==
- George Rogers Clark by Felix de Weldon, bronze, located immediately east of the park section
- York (William Clark's enslaved servant) by Ed Hamilton, bronze, located on the Belvedere; erected in 2003, with plaques commemorating the Lewis and Clark Expedition and York's participation in it

== See also ==
- Belle of Louisville
- Louisville Falls Fountain
- List of attractions and events in the Louisville metropolitan area
