= Waterfront Development Corporation =

- Established: September 25, 1986
- Chairman: Matt Thornton
- Director: David K. Karem
- Parent organization: City of Louisville; Jefferson County; Commonwealth of Kentucky
- Budget: $1.85 million (2006)
- Employees: 16 (2006)
- Volunteers: 100 (2006)

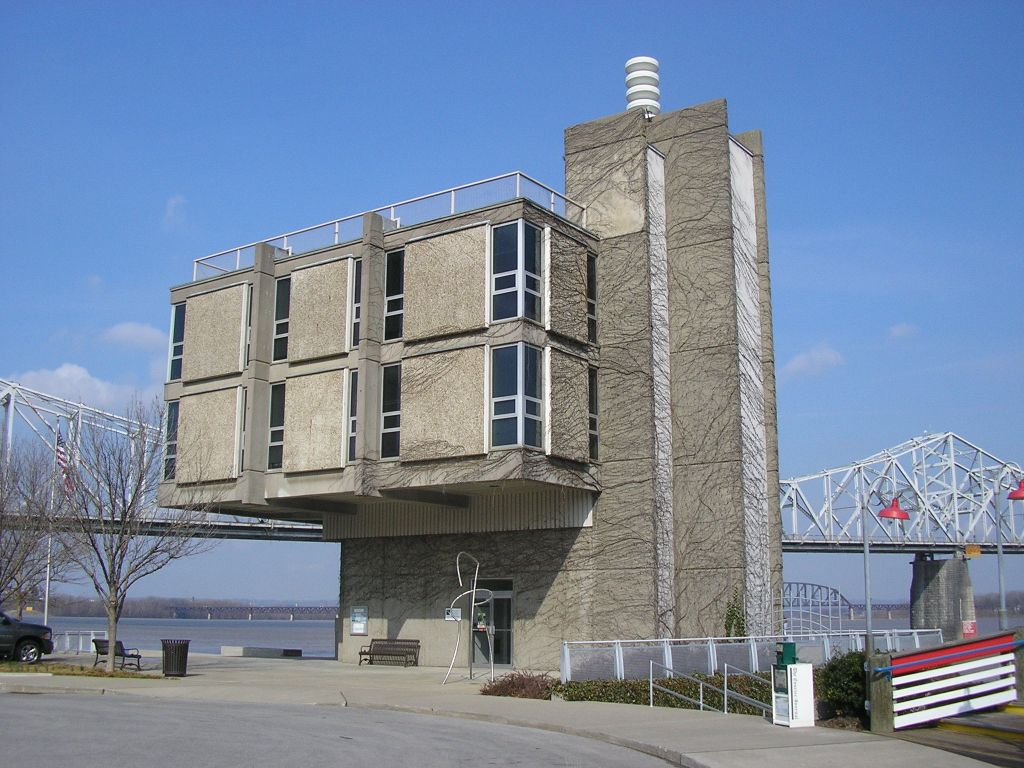
WDC main office

The Waterfront Development Corporation (WDC) of Louisville, Kentucky is a non-profit/stock corporation created by the Kentucky General Assembly in 1986.

For many years before the Waterfront Development Corporation's founding in 1986 political leaders in Louisville had hoped to do something about what was perceived by much of the community as unattractive industrial areas and brownfields along the Ohio River in the downtown area. Due to the pressure of politics and the ever-changing makeup of the political leadership ideas and/or plans for the area's revitalization would often change. Community leaders sought to create an entity that would be insulated from electoral politics and therefore free to enact a long-term community vision for the revitalization Louisville Riverfront. An agreement to provide equal funding between the governments of Louisville, Jefferson County, and the Commonwealth of Kentucky led to the creation of the Waterfront Development Corporation.

Waterfront Development Corporation manages the downtown riverfront revitalization efforts, the centerpiece of which is Louisville Waterfront Park on the banks of the Ohio River. From the inception of the Articles of Incorporation WDC has been governed by a fifteen-member board of directors. Initially the board of directors was appointed equally between the three governments; this structure changed with the merger of Louisville, Jefferson County government. The post-merger structure has nine appointments from the city government and six from the state government.

After determining that a Downtown park was the public's favored redevelopment option the Board of Directors requested qualifications for creation of a Master Plan. After a lengthy review process of dozens of submissions the Board of Directors selected the Hargreaves Associates to create the Waterfront Park Master Plan. The Hargreaves plan was chosen as the submission that best connected the city back to its roots along the Ohio River, an example of this is the Great Lawn which actually connects the city grid to the river. The Great Lawn breaks the barrier of I-64 creating an open space between the river and Witherspoon Street.

The corporation's three-part mission includes oversight of the design and construction of Waterfront Park, operation of the park/ event coordination, and park maintenance. WDC also administers design review for properties within the Waterfront District (the Waterfront Review Overlay or WRO District).

== Corporate leadership ==
President/Executive Director

- Deborah Bilitski
- David K. Karem (Director Emeritus)

Chairman of the Board of Directors

- Christopher Jones, current chair
- Matt Thornton 2005–
- Ollie Barber 2002–2005
- Charles McCarty 1991–2002
- A. Stevens Miles 1987–1991
- David K. Karem 1986–1987

== Divisions ==
- Corporate Operations
- Development
- Events
- Maintenance
- Belle of Louisville

== Waterfront Park ==
=== Phase I ===
Phase I of Waterfront Park, approximately 55 acres (220,000 m^{2}), was dedicated on July 4, 1999. The park hosted hundreds of events in its first full season of use, with an estimated total attendance of more than a million people. The park is heavily used on a daily basis, and averages more than 1.5 million visitors per year. Children and families enjoy the Children's Play Area and the new Adventure Playground, while walkers, joggers, picnickers, school groups, and others take advantage of its location along the river.

=== Phase II ===
Phase II of the park opened on June 10, 2004. Phase II l adds approximately 17 acres (69,000 m^{2}), including the Adventure Playground, which opened in July 2003; an esplanade along the river's edge; a cafe plaza where Tumbleweed will open in Spring 2005; the Brown-Forman amphitheater; docks for transient boaters; and an area for a new rowing facility for the University of Louisville Women's Rowing Team, school, and community rowing groups.

==== Adventure Playground ====
The Adventure Playground is double the size of the Children's Playground (Phase I). The playground includes a large jungle gym play structure and a water play area, complete with water cannons, fish sculptures that shoot water and geysers.

==== Phase III ====
Construction on Phase III began in September 2005, and fund raising is underway. Phase III covers 13 acres (53,000 m^{2}) that will include a pedestrian walkway across the river and more lawn areas, tree groves, walking paths, and picnic areas.

== Riverview Park ==
Early in 2006 Metro Mayor Jerry Abramson asked The Waterfront Development Corporation to lead the proposed redevelopment of the Riverview Park (known to locals as "The Greenwood Boat Ramp") in southwest Jefferson County. The Waterfront Development Corporation Board agreed and initial design work has begun. The lead design staff on the project has held public meetings as the Master Plan is developed. No date has been set for completion.
