= Louisville Waterfront Park =

Non-profit organization and public park in Kentucky

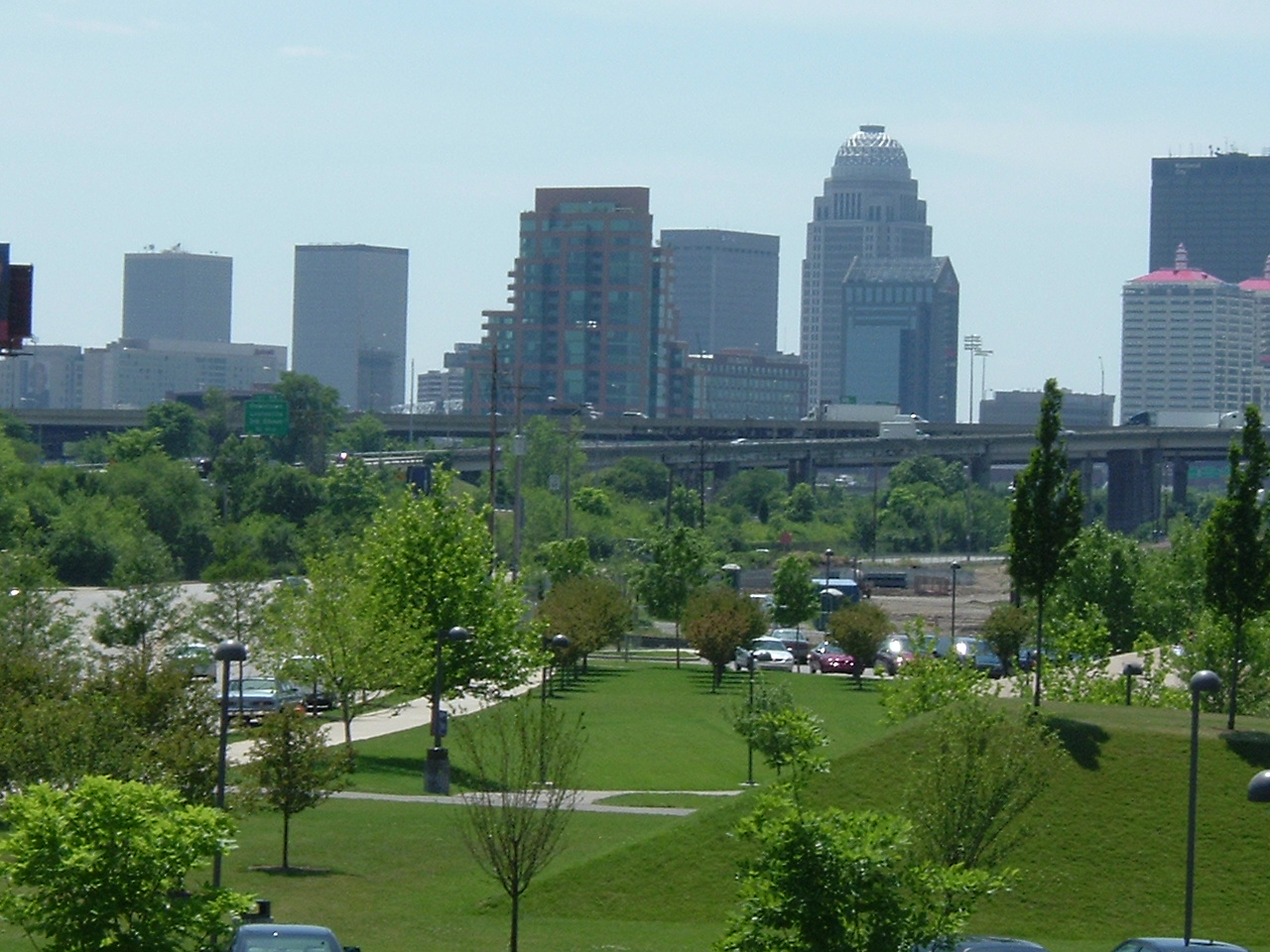
- Louisville Waterfront Park in Downtown Louisville
- Interactive map of Louisville Waterfront Park
- Type: Municipal park
- Location: Downtown Louisville, Kentucky, United States
- Coordinates: 38°15′33.73″N 85°44′46.72″W
- Area: 85 acres (340,000 m^{2})
- Created: 1999
- Operator: Waterfront Development Corporation
- Status: Open, expansion planned
- Website: ourwaterfront.org

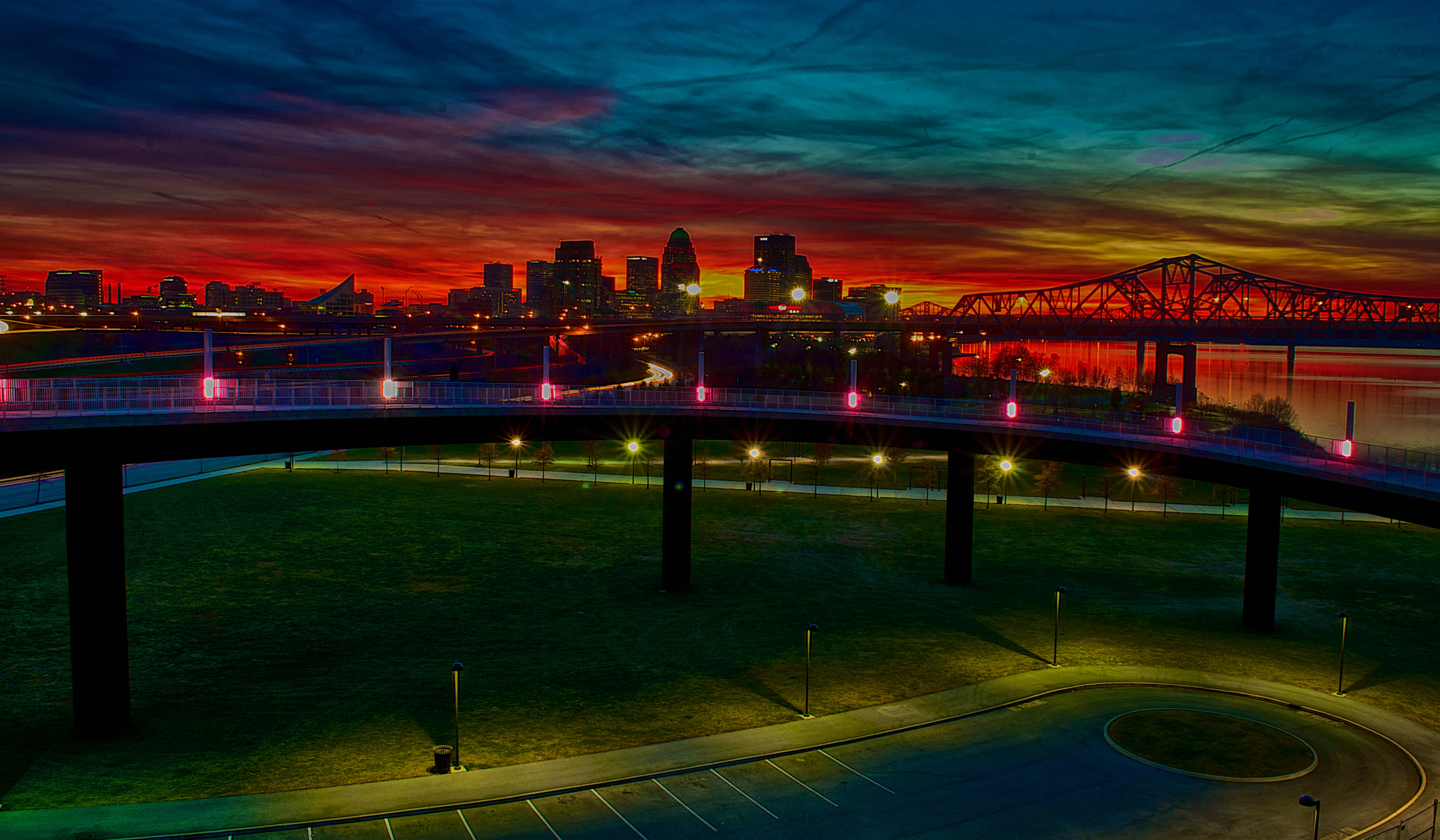
Waterfront Park at dusk, November 2012

Louisville Waterfront Park is both a non-profit organization and an 85-acre (340,000 m^{2}) public park adjacent to the downtown area of Louisville, Kentucky and the Ohio River. Specifically, it is adjacent to Louisville's wharf and Riverfront Plaza/Belvedere, which are situated to the west of the park. Once a wasteland of scrap yards and abandoned industrial buildings, Waterfront Park is now a vibrant green space that welcomes over 2.2 million visitors each year. Located in the park is the Big Four Bridge which connects the city of Louisville with the City of Jeffersonville, Indiana. Waterfront Park is home to some of Louisville's most exciting celebrations, such as the Fourth of July at Waterfront Park, Forecastle Festival, WFPK Waterfront Wednesdays and Thunder Over Louisville. In 2013 the park won the Rudy Bruner Award for Urban Excellence a national design award that seeks to identify and honor places that address economic and social concerns in urban design.

== Development ==
Phase I construction (1994–1999)

Phase I consisted of approximately 55 acres (220,000 m^{2}), and the initial development cost was about $58 million, combining public and private money. The park's site was previously used for industrial purposes: scrap yards, sandpits, and other industrial sites. The ground was broken for the project in 1994, and the space was dedicated in 1999. This phase of construction included much of the park from the western edge up to, but not including, the Big Four Bridge. Mass excavations were completed in 1995 and the wharf in 1996. Louisville architects Bravura Corporation and Hargreaves Associates were the park's designers. This development phase included the Great Lawn, Joe's Crab Shack, walking paths, and play areas. The park hosted hundreds of events in its first full season of use, including outdoor concerts and other festivals, with an estimated total attendance of more than a million people. There were problems early-on with the grass being too easily worn down by visitors.

Phase II construction (1999–2004)

Phase II, covering 17 acres, completed the east end of the park The development costs were about $15 million. Key developments include the second children's play area, a restaurant space, the Brown–Forman amphitheater, a boathouse, additional parking, additional picnic areas, more green space, an extension of the riverfront walking path, and a rowing facility. The rowing facility is used by the University of Louisville Women's Rowing team, school and community groups. Phase II initially intended to include the spiral ramp up to the Big Four Bridge, but was postponed to Phase III due to a redesign related to geotechnical and flood control issues.

Phase III construction (2005–2012)

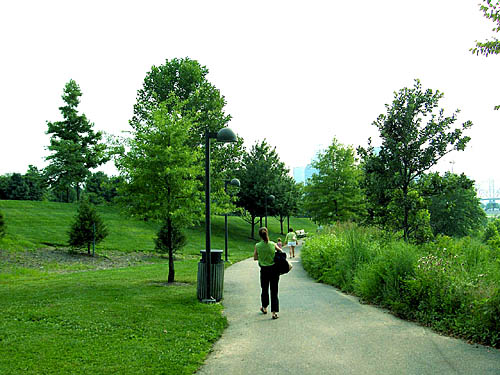
The park exhibits rolling hills, spacious lawns and walking paths.

Phase III construction began in late spring of 2005, to add 13 acres (53,000 m^{2}) and include the conversion of the former Big Four Railroad bridge going between the park and Jeffersonville, Indiana's waterfront park into a pedestrian bridge. This phase of development cost roughly $41 million. It also included the announcement to develop Riverview Park and RiverPark Place by Poe Development and WDC. The Lincoln Memorial was completed in 2009 and the Big Four Lawn opened in 2010.

In February 2011, Kentucky Governor Steve Beshear and Indiana Gov. Mitch Daniels announced that the two states, along with the City of Jeffersonville, will allocate $22 million in funding to complete the Big Four Bridge project, creating a pedestrian and bicycle path to link Louisville and Jeffersonville. Indiana spent $8 million and the City of Jeffersonville provided $2 million in matching dollars to pay for construction of a ramp to the Big Four Bridge. Kentucky is pledged $12 million to replace the deck on the bridge and connect it to the spiral ramp that had been completed in Waterfront Park. The bridge was completed in May 2014 with the opening of the Jeffersonville ramp.

Phase IV

Phase IV of development for Waterfront Park is a proposed $35 million investment to expand the park 22 acres uniting downtown and West Louisville along the waterfront. Phase IV land lies west of Louisville's principal wharf and harbor area at Fourth Street. Largely neglected, it sits beneath the I‐64 Interstate Highway. Phase IV will celebrate the rich local history and heritage of the area. The site was the location of Louisville's first frontier fortress, Fort on Shore, and later a heavy industrial site. In the first component of Phase IV, Waterfront park and Kentucky Science Center have partnered to create an outdoor experiential learning area called Playworks at Waterfront Park. The new area will include creative play structures and various interactive displays featuring various artifacts to celebrate and teach the waterfront's history. Concept design for Playworks at Waterfront park was finalized in 2018, and construction is anticipated to be completed near the beginning of 2024.

== Features ==
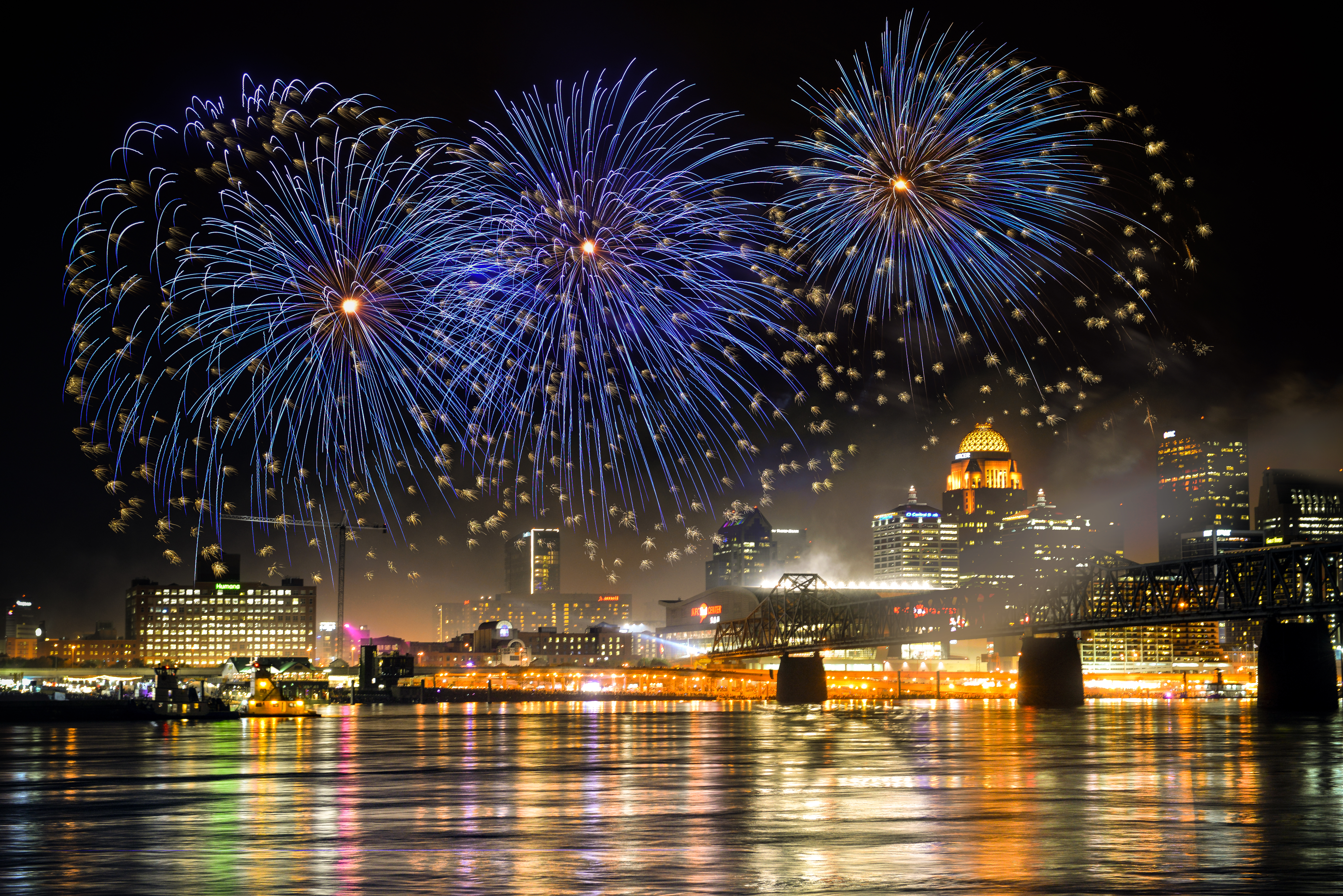
Thunder Over Louisville 2018

Each year the park is features numerous exciting events such as Thunder Over Louisville, Forecastle Festival, WFPK Waterfront Wednesdays, Fridays at the Front, Fourth of July at Waterfront Park, and the Juneteenth Jubilee Celebration.

There are two playgrounds in Waterfront Park; the original Children's Play Area at the Orange parking lot (west of the Harbor Lawn) and the Adventure Playground and Splash Park at the Silver parking lot (east of the Big Four Bridge). The Children's Play Area was one of the first spaces to be completed in 1997. This playground includes three areas for different age groups and a climbing rock nearby. The play area has views of the river, the Great Lawn, and the downtown skyline.

All of the walkways in Waterfront Park have been built to meet ADA standards. Wherever there are stairs at the park, there are also walkways for accessing the same area. The Big Four Bridge is accessible by ramp on the Kentucky and Jeffersonville side. Service animals are allowed everywhere in the park. An Accessible Signage Program helps park visitors with visual impairment navigate and enhance their park experience. Each sign includes raised letters, a Braille translation, and tactile graphics. Textured pads at the edge of sidewalks provide underfoot cues for the signs.

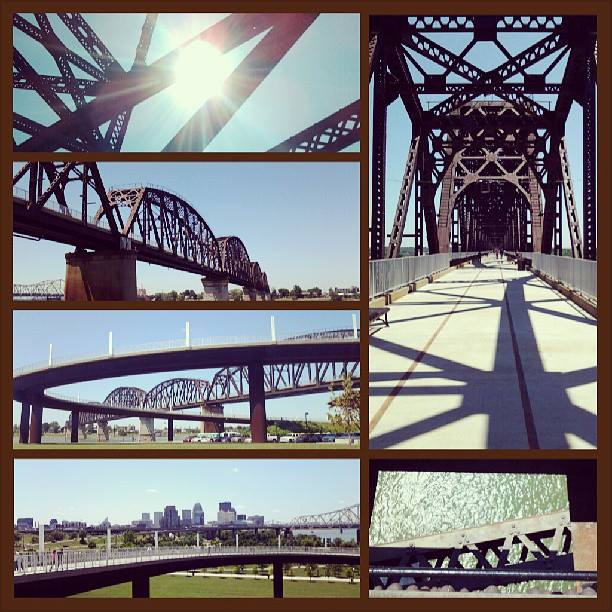
Big Four Bridge, May 2013

The Big Four Bridge crosses the Ohio River connecting Waterfront Park to Jeffersonville, Indiana. Constructed in 1895 as a railroad bridge, the Big Four Bridge first provided rail access for freight and passengers traveling between Louisville and Southern Indiana. The bridge operated until 1969 when it was decommissioned, the ramps removed several years later. The Waterfront Master Plan, developed in the early 1990s, included the Big Four as a pedestrian bridge. On February 6, 2013, the city opened an elliptical ramp and the bridge to pedestrians and bicycles. Waterfront Park installed counters on the Louisville ramp in 2013, helping to calculate an average of 1.5 million pedestrians and bicycles that cross the bridge each year. In 2014, Jeffersonville built their ramp to complete the Big Four experience. The bridge itself is approximately 1/2 mile (2,562 ft.) long. Each ramp is 1/4 mile (1,181 ft.) long. The entire distance totals two miles. The Big Four Bridge has an LED lighting system that wraps the iron fretwork in vibrant colors. The lights can be programmed to have a rainbow effect, highlighting the beauty and strength of the bridge structure.

The Vietnam Memorial stands at the base of the Big Four Bridge. An American flag flies 70 feet in the air and is visible from the bridge. Dedicated on November 19, 1983, the memorial originally stood on the Belvedere. In 2014, The structure was moved to its current home. The Kentucky Vietnam Veterans Memorial Fund funded the memorial.

Dedicated in the summer of 2009, the Lincoln Memorial at Waterfront Park was part of the bicentennial celebration of Lincoln's birth. The Commonwealth of Kentucky, the family of Harry S. Frazier Jr., and the Kentucky Historical Society/Kentucky Abraham Lincoln Bicentennial Commission funded the memorial and selected nationally renowned Louisville artist Ed Hamilton to create both the Lincoln statue and the bas reliefs. The memorial features a 12-foot statue of Lincoln seated on a rock, looking out over the river. Four bas-reliefs (a type of sculpture carved from flat surrounding stone) illustrate Lincoln's ties to Kentucky.

The traveling SkyStar Wheel made its debut on March 29, 2018, in the park for the 2018 Kentucky Derby, Thunder Over Louisville, and Waterfront Wednesday season opener. It remained open until May 6, 2018. The base rent paid by the operator to the park was US$25,000 or 5% of gross profits, whichever was greater.

== Issues ==
I-64 runs through the park, and portions of the park exist under it. 8664, a grassroots campaign, aimed to re-route I-64 to enhance Louisville's waterfront. However, I-64 was ultimately widened over the park as a part of the Ohio River Bridges Project, supported by the Mayor and most involved in city and interstate planning.

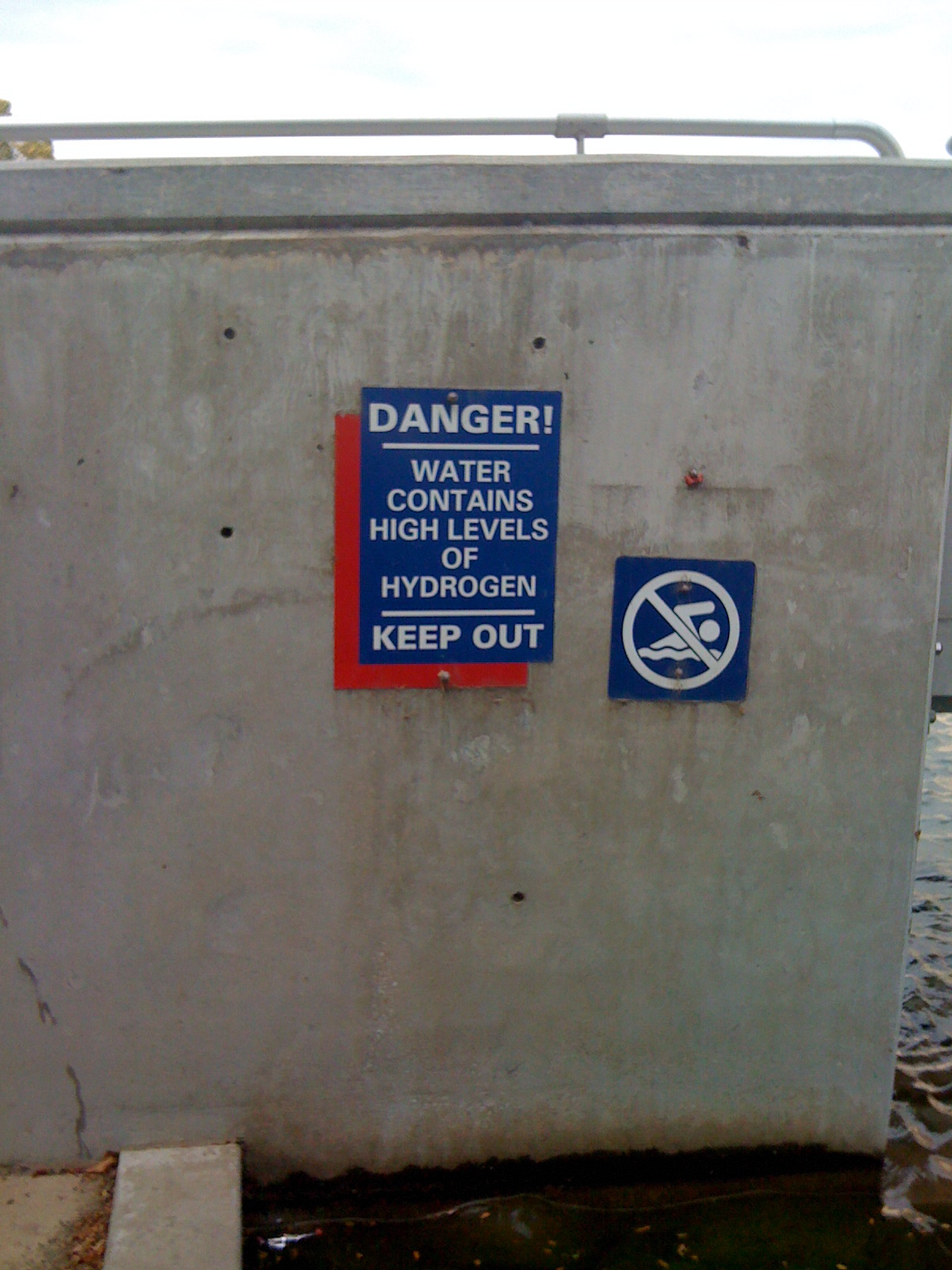
Danger (hoax) sign at Waterfront Park fountain

In May 2007 designs for the span over the Great Lawn were released, causing some controversy. The two proposed designs called for either 40 or 58 pillars, at a cost of $48 or $36 million, respectively. The Waterfront Development Corporation favored a $160 million proposal which could have as few as 10 pillars, and an aesthetically pleasing span design. This more expensive proposal was left out of the options presented. The Kentucky Transportation Cabinet later apologized for omitting the design and said it could still be considered, but additional funding would have to be found.

In 2006, David Karem, executive director of the Waterfront Development Corporation, a public agency that operates Waterfront Park, wished to deter visitors from bathing in the large public fountain. He initiated a plan that was dependent on the average park visitor's "lack of understanding about water's chemical makeup", and arranged for signs that read: "DANGER! – WATER CONTAINS HIGH LEVELS OF HYDROGEN – KEEP OUT". The signs were posted on the fountain at public expense. As it is true that ordinary water molecules each contain two atoms of hydrogen, and thus posed no danger, it is considered one of many water-related hoaxes.

== See also ==
- City of Parks
- Louisville Falls Fountain
- List of attractions and events in the Louisville metropolitan area
- List of parks in the Louisville metropolitan area
