= Big Four Bridge =

Pedestrian bridge that crosses the Ohio River at Louisville, Kentucky

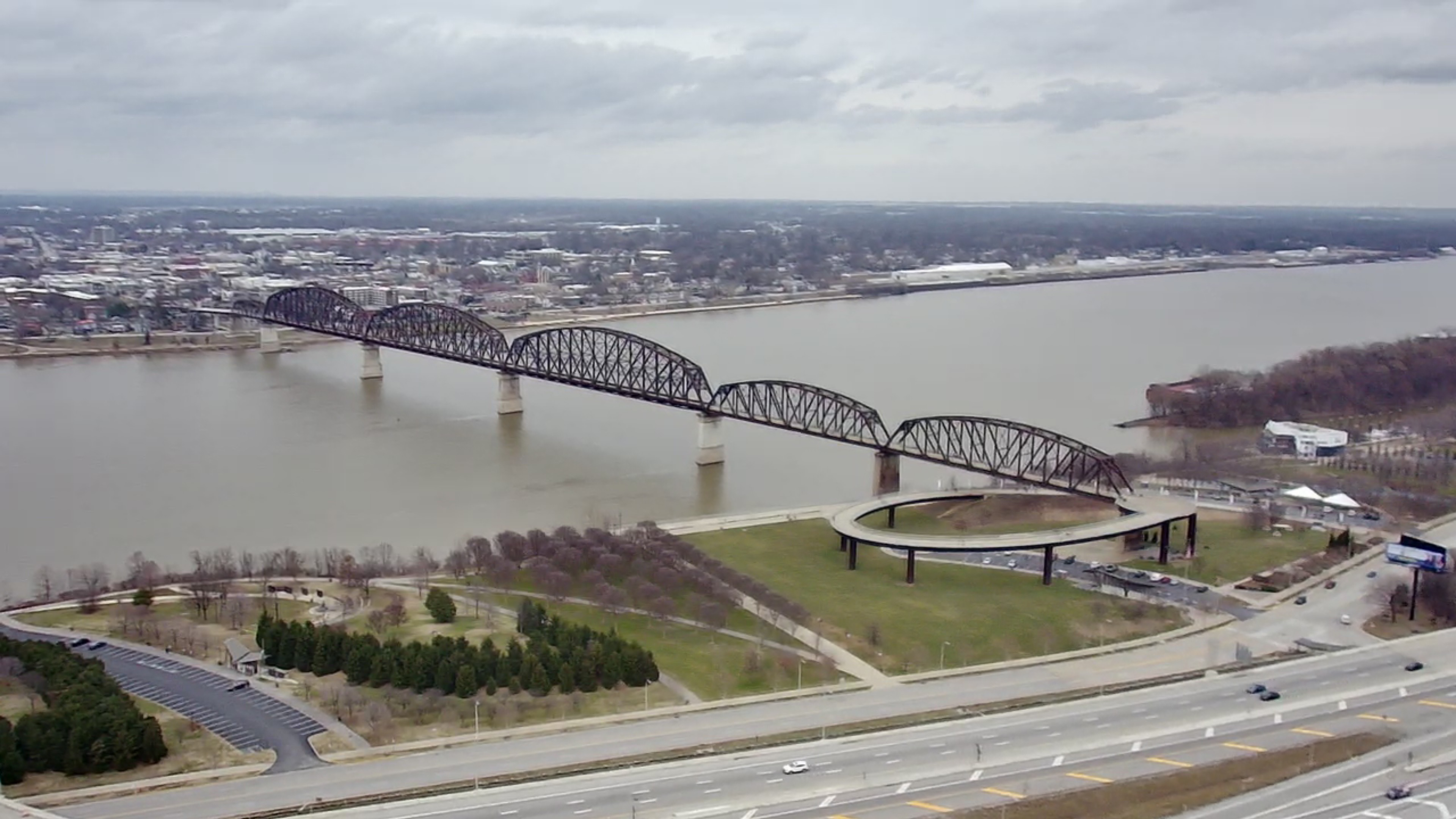
- The bridge in 2024
- Coordinates: 38°15′56″N 85°44′20″W
- Carries: Pedestrians and cyclists
- Crosses: Ohio River
- Locale: Louisville, Kentucky, and Jeffersonville, Indiana, United States
- Website: ourwaterfront.org/feature/big-four-bridge/

Characteristics
- Total length: 2,525 ft (770 m)
- Longest span: 547 ft (167 m)
- Clearance above: 53 ft (16 m)

History
- Construction cost: $3.5 million
- Opened: 1895
- Closed: End of railroad use 1968

Location
- Interactive map of Big Four Bridge

The Big Four Bridge is a six-span truss bridge that crosses the Ohio River, connecting Louisville, Kentucky, and Jeffersonville, Indiana. It was completed in 1895 and rebuilt in 1929. It was taken out of rail service in 1968, and the original approaches that carried rail traffic onto the main spans were first removed in 1974–1975, earning the Big Four Bridge the nickname "Bridge That Goes Nowhere". It was converted to bicycle and pedestrian use in 2013. The largest single span is 547 feet (167 m); the entire bridge spans 2,525 feet (770 m). It took its name from the defunct Cleveland, Cincinnati, Chicago and St. Louis Railway, which was nicknamed the "Big Four Railroad".

== Description ==
The Big Four Bridge is a six-span bridge, totaling 2,525 feet (770 m) long, with a clearance of 53 feet (16 m). The northernmost span is a riveted, eight-panel Parker through truss. The next three spans are 547 feet (167 m) long, and are riveted, 16-panel Pennsylvania through trusses. The two southern spans are riveted, 10-panel Parker through trusses.

It originally carried a single track of railway. Today, access to the Big Four Bridge is limited to pedestrian and bicycle use.

== Original bridge ==
=== Planning and construction ===
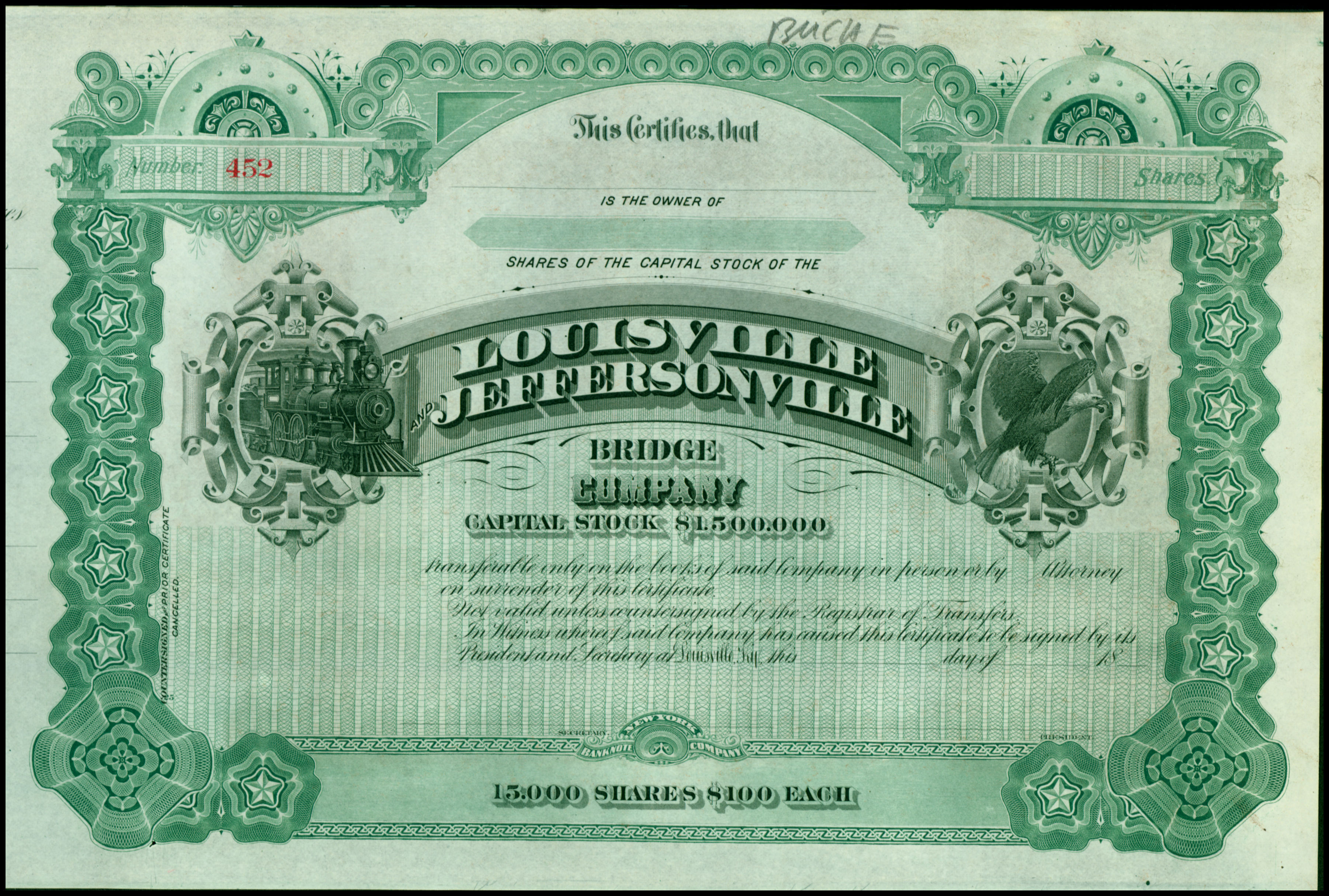
Unissued share of the Louisville and Jeffersonville Bridge Company

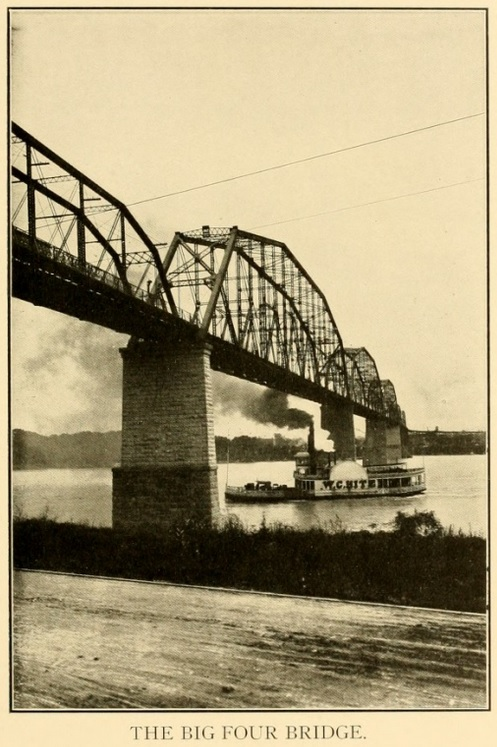
Photo of Big Four Bridge in Baird's History of Clark County, Indiana, published in 1909

The Big Four Bridge was first conceived in Jeffersonville in 1885 by various city interests. The Louisville and Jeffersonville Bridge Company was formed in 1887 to construct the Big Four Bridge, after a charter by the state of Indiana; Kentucky also chartered the company in 1888. The riverboat industry, a big economic factor in Jeffersonville, had requested that the bridge be built further upstream from the Falls of the Ohio, but the United States Army Corps of Engineers approved the building site, even after vocal protests.

Construction began on October 10, 1888. The Big Four Bridge would be the only Louisville bridge with serious accidents during its building; 37 individuals died during its construction. The first 14 died on January 9, 1890, at 5:40 PM while working on Pier Number 5 foundation when a caisson that was supposed to hold back the river water flooded, drowning the workers. Another six men died a few months later on May 14, 1890, at 5:10 PM when a wooden beam broke while working on a different pier, Pier Number 4 caisson.

The Big Four Bridge had one of the biggest bridge disasters in the United States, occurring on December 15, 1893, at 10:20 AM when a construction crane was dislodged by a severe wind, causing the falsework support of a truss to be damaged and the truss—with forty-one workers on it—to fall into the Ohio River. Twenty of the workers survived, but 21 died. The accident almost cost more lives, as a ferry crossing the Ohio River just barely missed being hit by the truss. Hours later, a span next to the damaged span also fell into the river, but was unoccupied at the time, causing no injuries. As a result, falsework was longitudely reinforced to prevent further occurrences, and also to prevent strong winds from causing similar damage by using special bracing on the bottom frame of the truss. Also, a new rule was enforced: "never trust a bolted joint any longer than is necessary to put a riveted one in place".

=== Operation ===
The Big Four Bridge was finally completed in September 1895. Due to the various accidents, the Louisville and Jeffersonville Bridge Company was financially strapped after building the bridge, and later in 1895 sold it to the Indianapolis-based Cleveland, Cincinnati, Chicago and St. Louis Railway, also known as the Big Four Railroad. This gave the railway its first entry into the Louisville market, although the railroad would have likely used the bridge even if they had not bought it, as they desired access to Louisville.

One effect of the opening of the Big Four Bridge was increased transportation of freight by rail, significantly decreasing the number of packet boats that at one time crossed the Ohio River by the dozens.

On February 19, 1904, a Baltimore and Ohio train accidentally crossed the Big Four Bridge, because engineer Dick Foreman fell asleep and went the wrong way at Otisco, Indiana. The fireman kept shoveling coal and did not pay attention. It was the conductor who finally noticed the error midway across the Big Four Bridge. The wayward train had to back up all the way back to Otisco.

On September 12, 1905, the first interurban crossed the Big Four Bridge. On January 14, 1918, two interurbans collided on the Big Four Bridge at 5:30 PM in a blinding snowstorm, killing three passengers and injuring 20 others aboard.

== Current bridge ==
=== Construction ===
Due to the increasing weight of the rail traffic, contracts were finalized in June 1928 to build a bigger Big Four Bridge, which opened on June 25, 1929. The new Big Four Bridge was built on the piers of the old bridge, a "novel building process", as it sped up the time necessary to build the new bridge; the old one served to reinforce the new one as it was being built. The old piers would still be used, but the falsework was entirely removed.

During construction, the Big Four Bridge's usual rail traffic was routed over the Kentucky & Indiana Terminal Bridge. The interurbans that used the Big Four Bridge would instead disembark at Sellersburg, Indiana, and have the passengers board buses into Louisville for the duration of the Big Four's reconstruction.

=== Rail operation ===
Interurbans ceased running in 1939. During the 1961 construction of the John F. Kennedy Memorial Bridge, because of the location of the Big Four Bridge and the growth of the Kennedy Interchange, the interchange had to avoid the columns that were on the approach to the bridge, causing the interchange to have several two-lane ramps rather than a single stretch of highway, and helped earn the nickname Spaghetti Junction.

In 1988 Oscar Arias, President of Costa Rica, contacted Louisville mayor Jerry Abramson to inquire about buying the bridge to dismantle it and reassemble in Costa Rica, as he believed it would be cheaper to import the bridge than build a new one. At the time the city did not actually own the bridge, and the plan never went through.

=== Abandonment ===
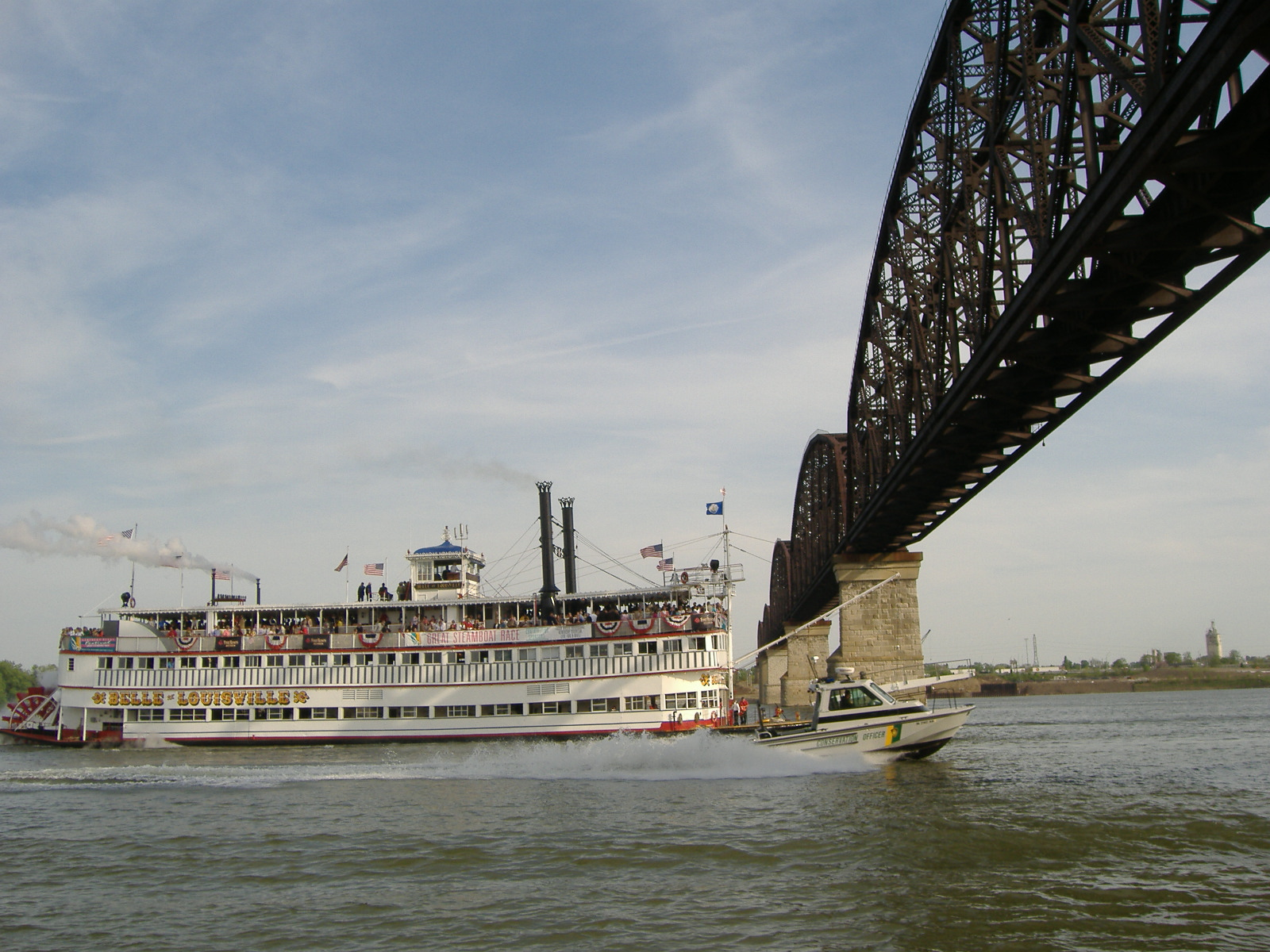
The Belle of Louisville crossing under the Bridge in the 2008 Great Steamboat Race

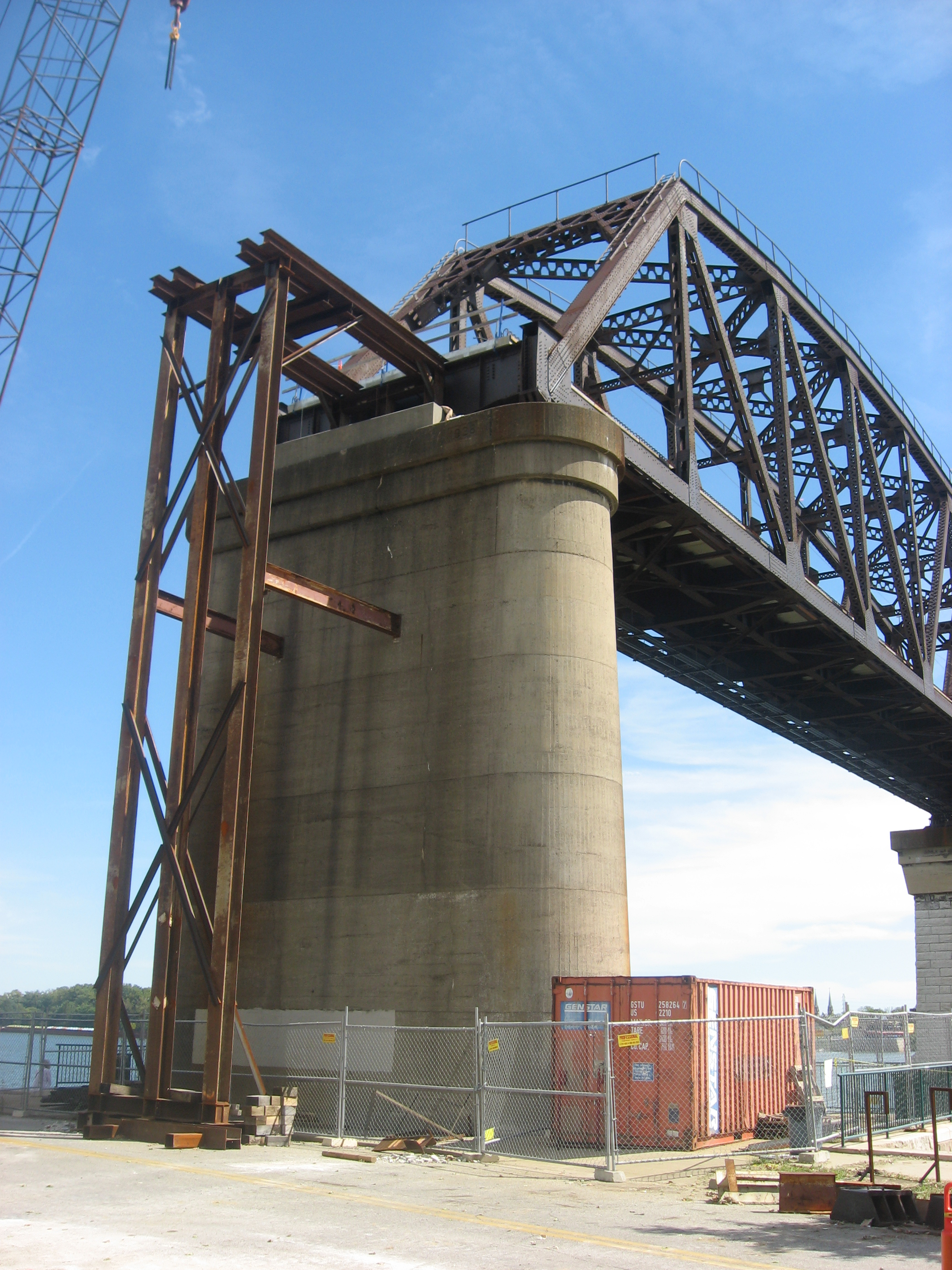
The northern end of the then-abandoned bridge in 2012

The Big Four Bridge fell into disuse after the Big Four Railroad's parent company, the New York Central Railroad, was merged into the Penn Central in 1968. The last train ran across the bridge on March 10, 1968. The Big Four Bridge's former traffic was then routed over Louisville's Fourteenth Street Bridge. From July 26, 1974, to January 1975, both approach spans were removed by the Detzel Construction Company of Cincinnati, Ohio, and were sold for scrap. As a result, the Big Four Bridge became the first Louisville bridge to fall out of use, and gained the nickname "Bridge That Goes Nowhere".

During the 1970s and 1980s, local radio station WLRS-FM lit up the Big Four Bridge as part of their "Bridge the Gap" Christmas promotion, which was used as a fund raiser for needy local families. Some of the lights spelled out "LRS 102".

Between its closing as a rail bridge and its reopening as a pedestrian span, the bridge had occasional fires; two in the 1970s, one in 1987 and one in 2008. In 1987 Christmas lights posted on the bridge to promote a toy drive started the fire; both the Jeffersonville and Louisville fire departments fought six to eight hours to put out the blaze.

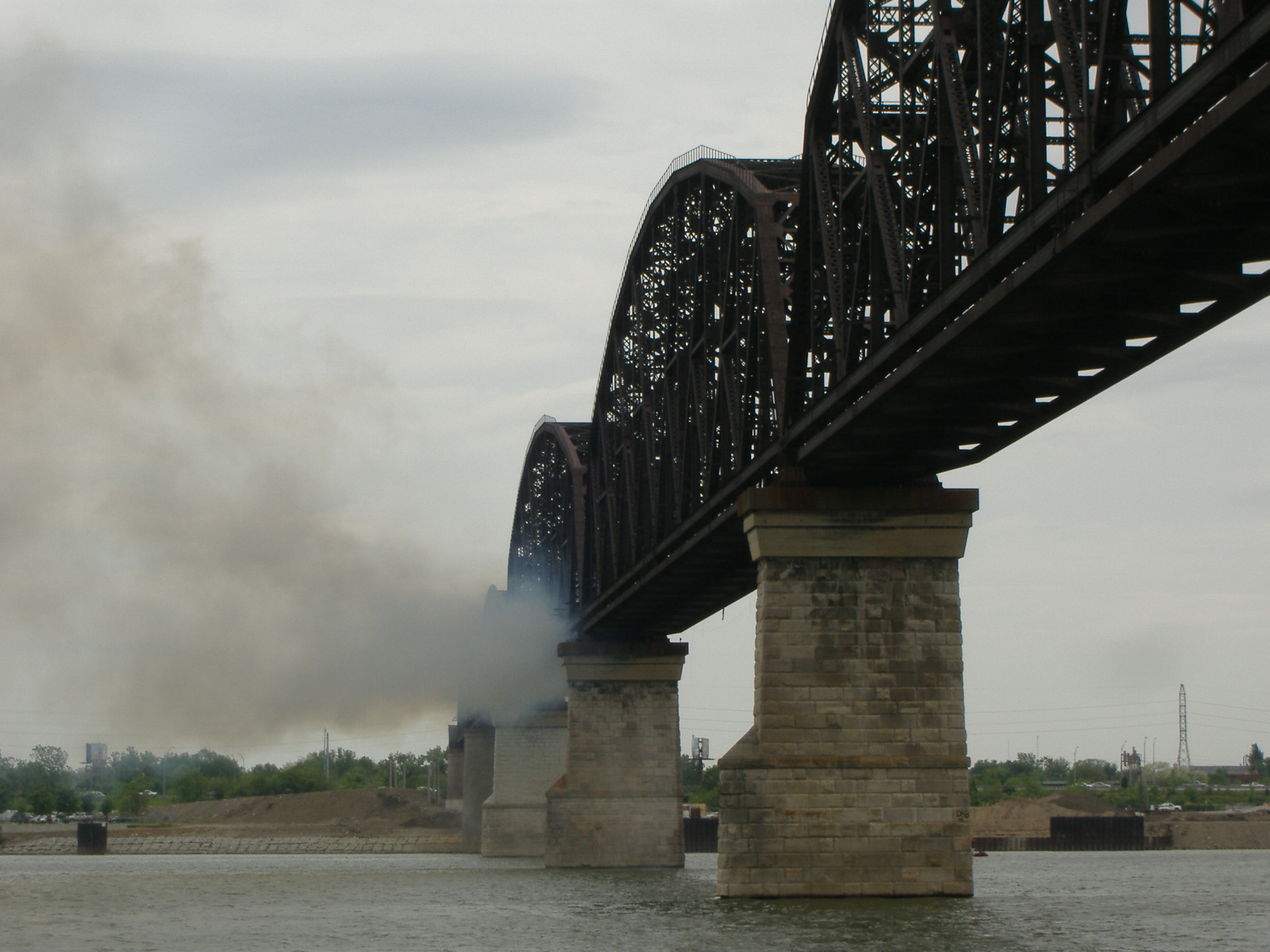
Closeup of May 7, 2008, fire

On May 7, 2008, the bridge caught fire a quarter mile (400 m) north of the Louisville end, shortly after noon, 70 to 80 feet (21 to 24 m) above the Ohio River; suspected to have started from an electrical problem. This fire was more troublesome due to the age and condition of the bridge; the wood trusses on the bridge were unsafe for firefighters to scale, due to the fire on the bridge ten years before. Louisville Fire & Rescue chief Greg Frederick decided that firefighters were not to be sent onto the bridge; a boat from the Harrods Creek Fire Department was used to put out the fire, as Louisville's fire boat did not have a hose that could reach the blaze on the bridge.

It took two and a half hours to control the fire. Navigation lights used for the heavy barge traffic were being changed at the time of the report. The Coast Guard shut down river traffic for about a mile around the bridge due to falling debris. An official determination on the cause of the fire was expected in June 2008.

=== Pedestrian bridge ===
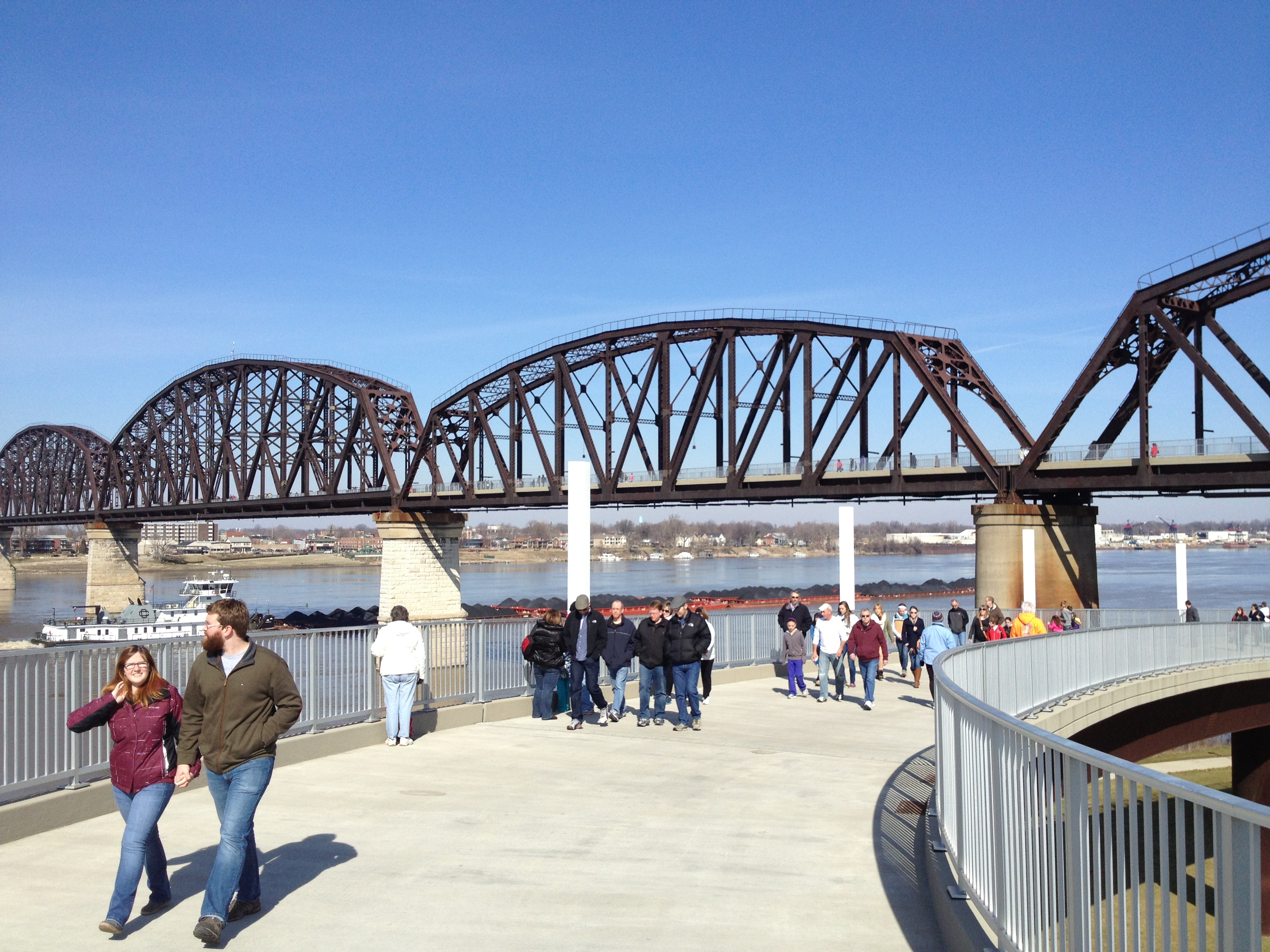
Pedestrians walking on the Big Four Bridge's Louisville ramp in 2013

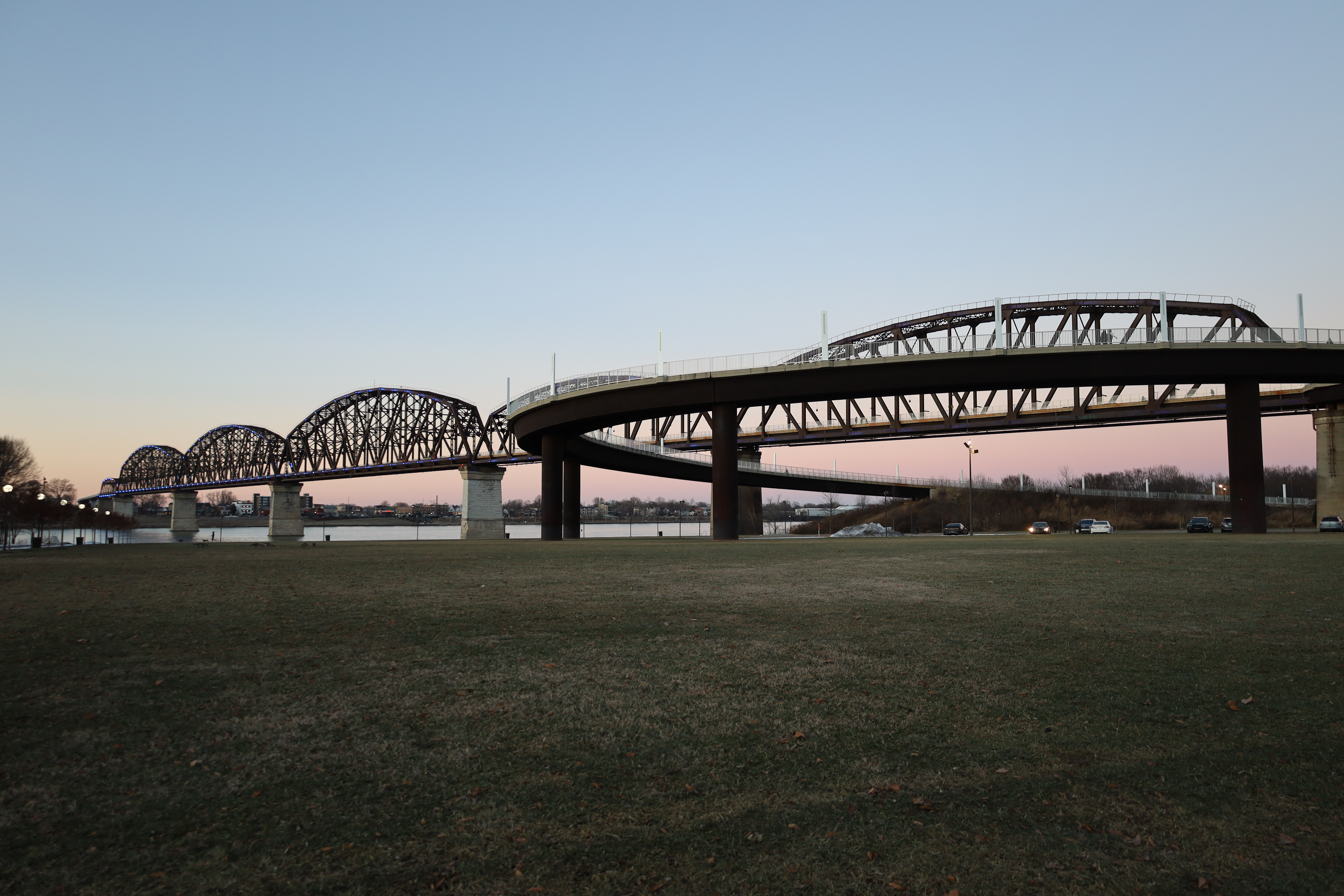
The bridge in 2025, showing the spiral pedestrian access ramp

In February 2011, Kentucky and Indiana announced that the two states, along with the City of Jeffersonville, would allocate $22 million in funding to complete the Big Four Bridge project, creating a pedestrian and bicycle path to link Louisville and Jeffersonville. Indiana would spend up to $8 million and the City of Jeffersonville would provide $2 million in matching dollars to pay for construction of a ramp to the Big Four Bridge. Kentucky pledged $12 million to replace the deck on the bridge and connect it to the spiral ramp that was completed in Waterfront Park.

After unsuccessful litigation to stop the project, the Big Four Bridge was converted into a pedestrian and bicycle bridge as part of Louisville Waterfront Park and the ongoing revitalization of the Louisville riverfront. This conversion had been proposed and planned since the 1990s. Previously, the George Rogers Clark Memorial Bridge downstream, which carries U.S. Route 31 across the river, was the only bridge allowing bicyclists and pedestrians to travel between Louisville and the neighboring Indiana cities of New Albany, Clarksville, and Jeffersonville.

On February 7, 2013, pedestrians were allowed to access the completed bridge from the ramp on the Kentucky side. Initially planned to open in August 2013, the Indiana-side ramp in Jeffersonville opened on May 20, 2014. Lighting along the bridge is required for safety and had been redesigned to please nearby residents. Originally, the lighting was to be similar to that on the Kentucky side, which has computer-controlled lights that can show various colors. The Indiana construction also had to be cautious of historic properties.

During Thunder Over Louisville, the Big Four Bridge sets the limit on how close private boats can get to the fireworks, which are centered three bridges away on the George Rogers Clark Memorial Bridge.

The Waterfront Development Corporation spent $500,000 in upgrades to the Louisville Waterfront Park near the bridge, which took place from late 2015 to early 2016. Improvements included additional landscaping, a new path west from the ramp, and a plaza underneath the bridge.

== See also ==
- List of bridges documented by the Historic American Engineering Record in Indiana
- List of bridges documented by the Historic American Engineering Record in Kentucky
- List of crossings of the Ohio River
- List of rail trails
- List of attractions and events in the Louisville metropolitan area
