= Lincoln Memorial at Waterfront Park =

Statue of Abraham Lincoln in Kentucky

Lincoln Memorial at Waterfront Park is a statue of Abraham Lincoln, depicted as he would have looked before he became President of the United States. The sculpture of him is bareheaded, seated on a rock with an open law book in one hand and the other in an outstretched, welcoming gesture. The statue is located at Waterfront Park in Louisville, Kentucky. The Lincoln Memorial in Louisville is part of the Lincoln Heritage Trail. The statue and its accompanying bas-relief historical panels were created by American sculptor Ed Hamilton. Landscape design for Waterfront Park was by Hargreaves Associates. The 2006 Kentucky General Assembly authorized $2 million for the memorial, which was supplemented by private donations.

== The Abraham Lincoln sculpture ==
In 2009 Ed Hamilton completed work on his sculpture of Abraham Lincoln, the 16th President of the United States. The sculpture was dedicated as part of a two-year bicentennial celebration of Lincoln's birth to show the influence of Lincoln's early impressions of slavery witnessed in Louisville's slave markets. The sculpture and bas relief tableaux reflect Lincoln's abhorrence of the institution of slavery and the role of his presidency and the City of Louisville in the conflict of the Civil War, the war which preserved the Union and abolished slavery.

In December 2023, the bronze tophat resting next to Lincoln disappeared. The tophat is presumed to have been stolen. Hamilton remarked "They had to be strong and determined to pry bronze from a base, good grief!"

== The bas-reliefs and their narrative ==
The interpretative bas reliefs of the history of slavery created by Ed Hamilton are part of the Lincoln Memorial at Waterfront Park. The narrative panels were unveiled by Hamilton at the same 2009 dedication ceremony as the Lincoln Memorial sculpture. The reliefs, placed side-by-side along a path to the statue, contain text and depict various times of Lincoln's life. The first panel describes Lincoln's childhood, and the second shows how slavery and the Civil War divided Lincoln's own family. The third panel's theme is Lincoln's growing political and social awareness, and the fourth and final relief shows seven slaves shackled together, with text quoting how Lincoln grew to hate slavery after witnessing slaves loaded onto a boat in Louisville. Words from Lincoln are written in the granite of the amphitheater, including "As I would not be a slave, so I would not be a master."

== The sculptor Ed Hamilton ==
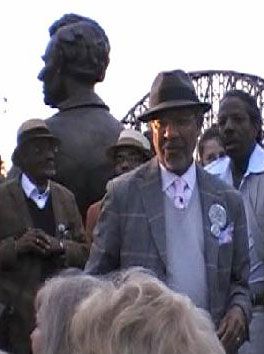
Sculptor Ed Hamilton in 2009, standing near the Lincoln statue he created, at its dedication ceremony

Ed Hamilton was apprenticed to Louisville sculptor Barney Bright, well known for his work on the Louisville Clock. In May through December 2002 the Speed Art Museum in Louisville mounted an exhibition of Hamilton's sculpture called From the Other Side and published an illustrated exhibition catalog to accompany the show. Hamilton also designed and created one of the African-American Civil War monuments in Washington, D.C., and a Lincoln statue at Centre College in Danville, Kentucky. Sculptor Hamilton said of the Lincoln sculpture that he wanted to show him as a man of the people:

I didn't want to do another Lincoln like all the other Lincolns...I wanted (it) to be a Lincoln of the people...And so my vision was...I thought wouldn't it be interesting to have him, say a morning time walking to the office...And all of a sudden he came upon this big boulder, and he just took a notion to sit down. And he set his books and his top hat on the boulder, and he started reading one of his books. And all of a sudden, someone caught his attention and with a gesture of saying 'Hey! Come, sit down. Welcome...'

== Waterfront Park ==
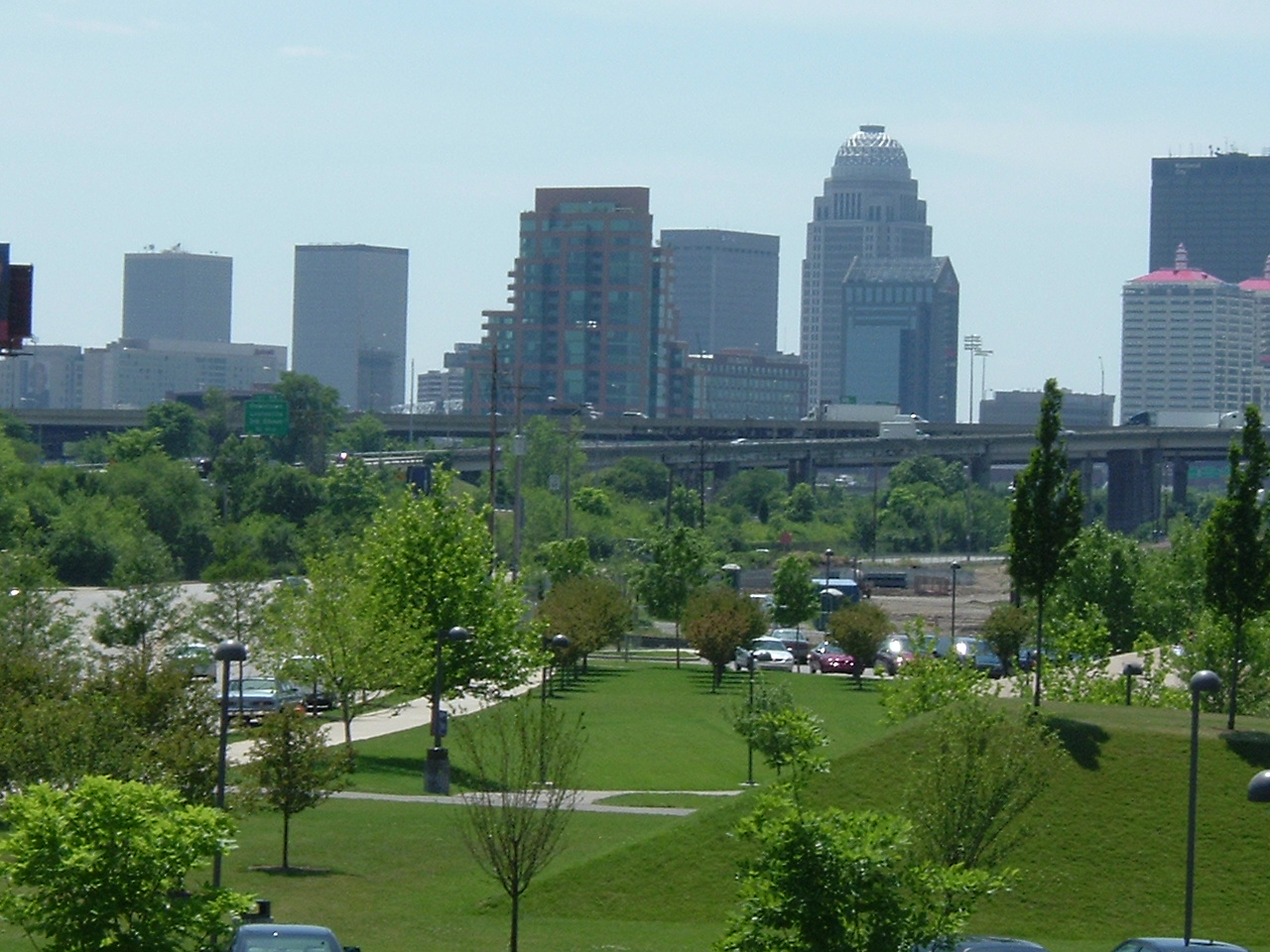
Louisville Waterfront Park

The Lincoln Memorial sculpture is located within the Waterfront Park, a city park by the Ohio River. Waterfront Park is part of the Louisville Riverwalk and the Kentucky Lincoln Heritage Trail. Landscaping of the Louisville Waterfront Park included planting of trees which Lincoln favored. The dedication of the park was celebrated June 3, 2009, with a public sunset event featuring a 50-piece orchestra performing works by American composer Aaron Copland and Louisville native William Mapother narrating Copland's Lincoln Portrait.

== See also ==
- List of statues of Abraham Lincoln
- List of sculptures of presidents of the United States
