= Thunder Over Louisville =

Annual kickoff event of the Kentucky Derby Festival

- Date: April
- Frequency: Annual
- Location: Louisville, Kentucky
- Founded: 1989; 37 years ago
- Website: thunderoverlouisville.org

Thunder Over Louisville is an annual airshow and fireworks display in Louisville, Kentucky, serving as the kickoff event of the Kentucky Derby Festival. It is held on a Saturday in April preceding the Kentucky Derby, the first Saturday in May, usually by two weeks. (Note: In years where Easter Sunday falls on the usually scheduled weekend, Thunder is moved a week earlier.) For some time, it was the largest annual fireworks display in North America. To this day, the event remains one of the largest.

Thunder began as part of an opening ceremonies event in 1989 with daytime fireworks. 1990 brought the first nighttime fireworks event. It officially began in its current location along the Ohio River in 1991 with fireworks, and an air show was added in 1992.

Thunder generally starts in the afternoon with an air show, followed by the fireworks show starting at 9:30 pm EDT, along with a synchronized soundtrack through PA and radio. An average of 625,000 people have attended each year since 1997, lining the banks of the Ohio River in Louisville, and across the river in Jeffersonville and Clarksville, Indiana. Some also watch from the river on boats, docked in positions auctioned off for charity. Eight 400-foot barges launch the fireworks, provided by Zambelli Fireworks Internationale, from both sides of the George Rogers Clark Memorial Bridge, and more fireworks are launched from the bridge itself.

In the 21st century the estimated attendance at Thunder has usually been approximately five times that of the main attraction, the Kentucky Derby.

== History ==
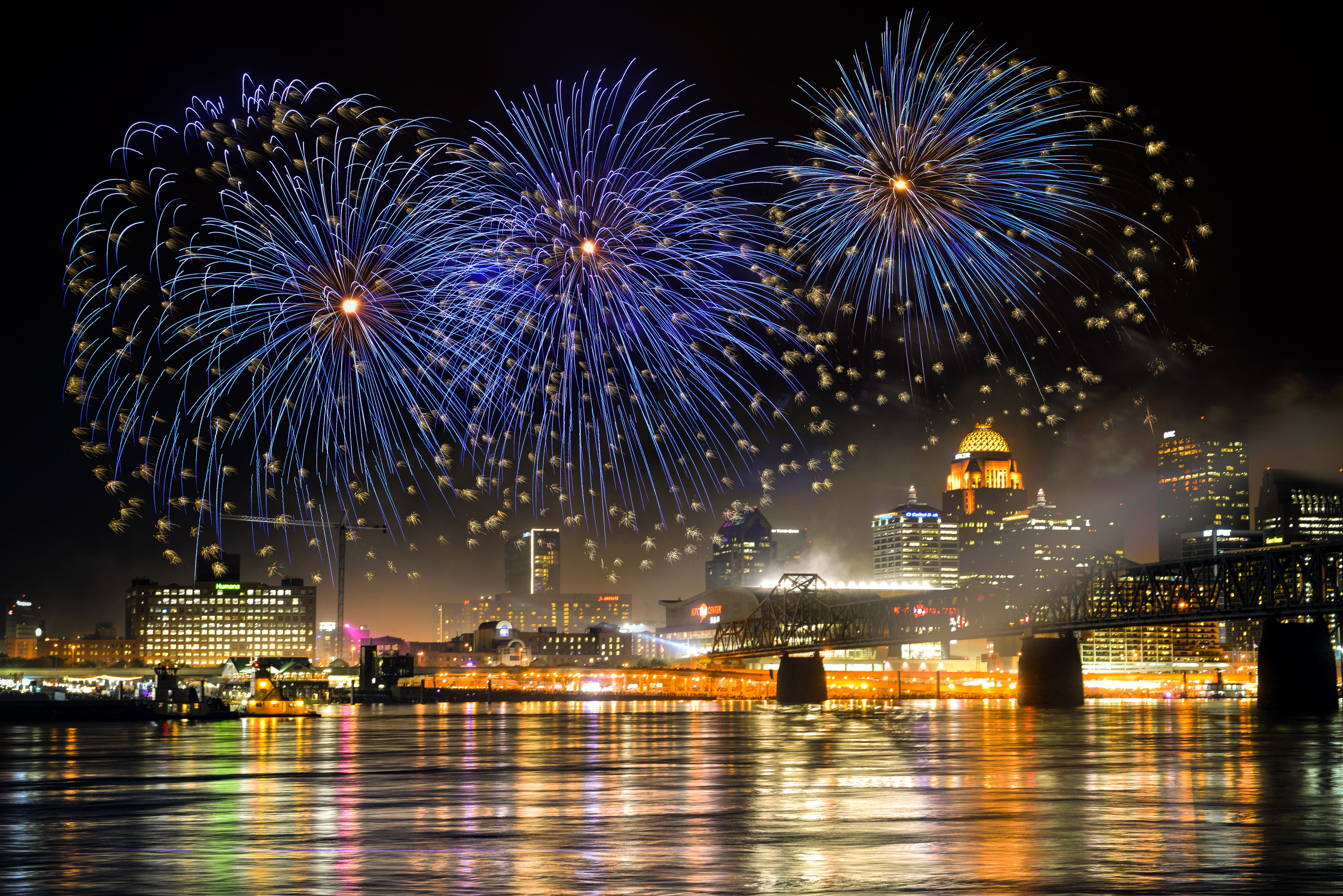
2018 show from the upstream side of the bridge on the Indiana shore of the Ohio River

Thunder Over Louisville began as a concept at a Kentucky Derby Festival workshop in the summer of 1988, after a decision had been made to have opening ceremonies for the first time.

The first opening ceremonies were held in 1989 at the Chow Wagon on the river and broadcast live to the They're Off! Luncheon crowd at the Galt House East. Organized by multimedia producer Wayne Hettinger, owner of Visual Presentations, they featured a live stage show to introduce the festival theme song and the release of about 20,000 multicolored balloons—followed by daytime fireworks. Attendance was estimated at 10,000.

The first nighttime fireworks show was in 1990 at the old Cardinal Stadium in the Kentucky Exposition Center, where more than 35,000 people attended a Derby Festival opening ceremonies concert by Janie Fricke and a 4,000-shell fireworks show following a sold-out Louisville Redbirds baseball game.

Fireworks had been used in Derby festivities since the 1960s, but the positive impact of fireworks on this concert—particularly the echoing sound—led to the firework show's name when it was held the following year over the Ohio River.

In 1991 the event moved to Waterfront Park, and Zambelli Fireworks Internationale's Master Pyrotechnician Raymond M Loffredo began handling the fireworks. The Air Show began in 1992, and has featured such notable aircraft as the Harrier, the B-2 (Stealth Bomber), and the F-117 (Stealth Fighter) as well as the Apache Attack Helicopter.

The event expanded rapidly in scale and attendance; by 1996 more shells were exploded in the first minute than in the entire 1990 show. In 1997, the Air Force designated Thunder Over Louisville as one of the events for its 50th anniversary celebration. More than 125 military aircraft performed that year, making it at the time the largest combined fireworks and air show in the US.

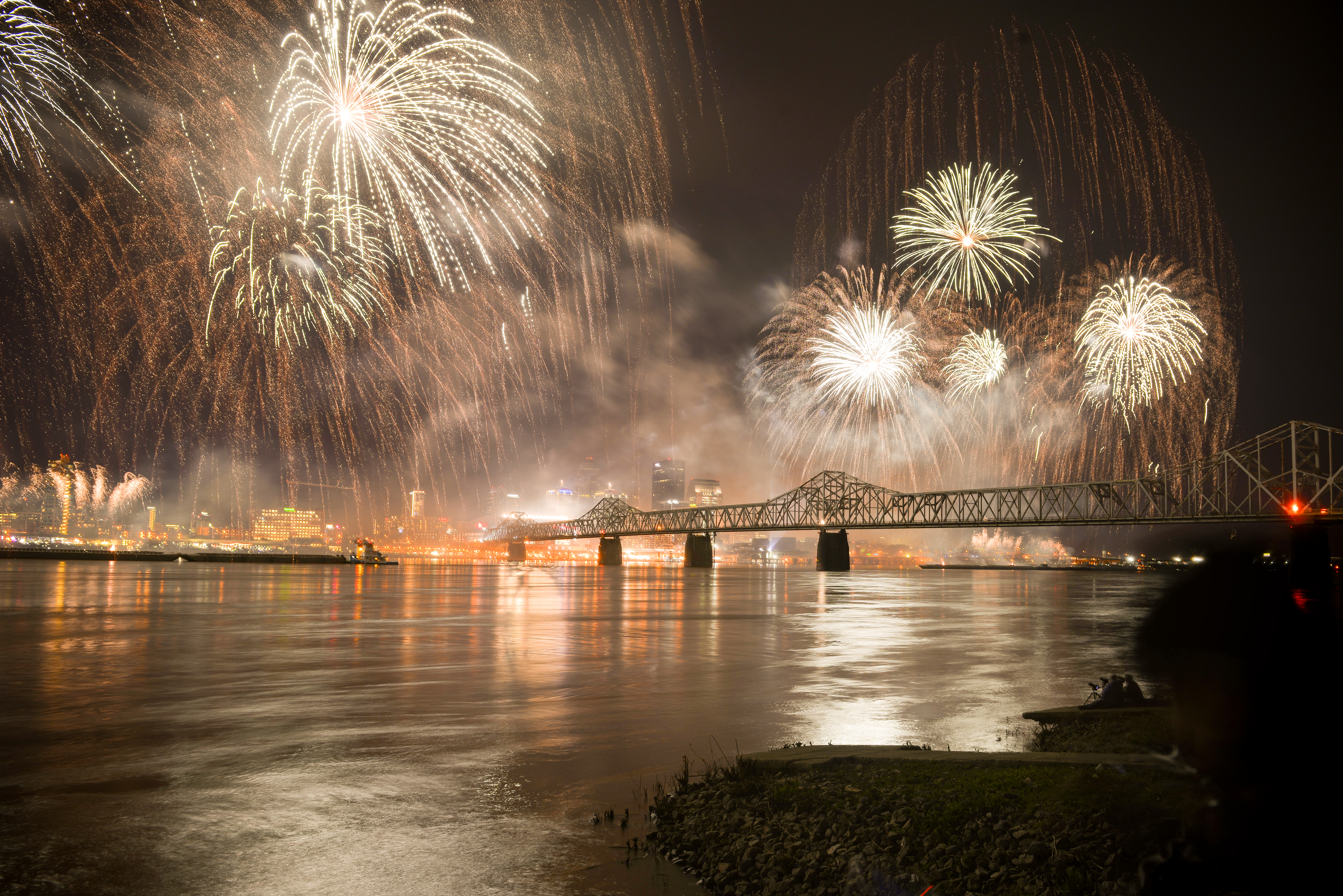
2018 show as seen from the Indiana side of the Ohio River

The event relies heavily on corporate donations. In 2000, when Kroger pulled out after 10 years of sponsorship, the Kentucky Derby Festival was left scrambling for money. They announced the Thunder Funder program, in which individuals can make small donations. In 2006, McDonald's announced that they would be the title sponsor for Thunder Funder and donate 10 cents from the sale of every 32-ounce drink in a commemorative cup to the Derby Festival. This promotion continued until 2014. In 2015, the restaurant chain pledged $100,000 to the event.

The fireworks show has grown in size and scope every year, with over 52,000 shells used in 2004, and 60,000 in 2005. The fireworks show usually lasts 30 minutes. There is traditionally a 3-minute finale which organizers call by the name Gargantuan. This is usually preceded by a short break in the fireworks and an audio score of "The Colonel Bogey March" as whistled in the movie Bridge on the River Kwai, often catching first time spectators, who believe the show has ended, by surprise.

The 2007 event had a record crowd, whose size was estimated at 850,000 by the event producer. Such counts do not include thousands of people who watch from area rooftops at "Thunder parties" held by individuals with proximity advantaged addresses in downtown, Old Louisville, Portland and the Butchertown neighborhood immediately upriver from downtown, as well as river adjacent neighborhoods in the Indiana communities of Clarksville and Jeffersonville.

In 2010, a computer glitch 30 seconds before the show during a pre-recorded minute long audio countdown to the fireworks caused an 18-minute delay while the problem was troubleshooted.

In 2020, Thunder Over Louisville was canceled for the first time in its history due to the COVID-19 pandemic. The Kentucky Derby was postponed to September, and took place with no spectators.

The following year, fireworks were launched throughout the city to reduce crowd sizes due to COVID-19 precautions. The show was televised locally, and in-person spectators were discouraged from gathering. The same year, a boat accident occurred on the Ohio River near the Greenwood Boat Docks as a large amount of spectators attempted to view the fireworks from the river. One barge collided with a boat, killing three people. Four people were rescued from the Ohio River by barge operators.

Year	Theme	Corporate sponsors	Attendance (estimate)	Shells	TV coverage
1991	"Thunder Over Louisville" used for fireworks only.	Kroger, UPS, Kool-Aid, Oscar Mayer	175,000	N/A	WHAS
1992	Celebrating KY's Bicentennial year, "Celebrate Kentucky"	Kroger, Louis Rich, UPS, Kool-Aid		N/A	WHAS
1993	Derby Festival Opening Ceremonies: Thunder Over Louisville	Kroger, Louis Rich, UPS, Coca-Cola, Paramount Foods		N/A	WHAS
1994	"Phantom of the Opera"	Kroger, Louis Rich, UPS, Coca-Cola, Paramount Foods		N/A	WHAS
1995	"An American Thunder"	Kroger, Louis Rich, UPS, Coca-Cola, Paramount Foods		N/A	WHAS
1996	"A Hollywood Thunder"	Kroger, Louis Rich, UPS, Coca-Cola, Tyson/Holly Farms		N/A	WHAS
1997	"A Wild Blue Thunder: USAF 50th Anniversary"	Kroger, Louis Rich, UPS, Coca-Cola, Tyson/Holly Farms	800,000	N/A	WHAS
1998	"A Thunder Fantasy"	Kroger, UPS, Coca-Cola, Kraft/Oscar Mayer	450,000	34,126	WHAS
1999	"The Best of Thunder" 10th Anniversary	Kroger, UPS, Tyson/Holly Farms	500,000	39,420	WHAS
2000	"A Millennium Thunder"	Blue Chip Broadcasting, Brown & Williamson Tobacco Corporation, Caesars Indiana, Ford, UPS	750,000	45,000	WHAS
2001	"A Festival Odyssey"	Blue Chip Broadcasting, Caesars Indiana, Ford, UPS	700,000	51,333	WHAS
2002	"A Stars & Stripes Thunder"	Caesars Indiana, Ford, Radio One, Thorntons, Tricon, UPS	600,000	51,334	WHAS
2003	"Centennial of Flight"	Caesars Indiana, Ford, UPS, Yum! Brands	750,000	Under 50,000 (Note: An official count was not released for the 2003 show, which was scaled down due to budget reductions.)	WHAS
2004	"A Broadway Thunder"	Caesars Indiana, Ford, UPS	700,000	52,000	WAVE
2005	"Thunder Rocks"	Caesars Indiana, Chase, Ford, UPS	300,000	60,000	WAVE
2006	"Thunder Country"	Caesars Indiana, Chase, E.On U.S., UPS	800,000	N/A	WLKY
2007	"The Magic of Thunder"	Caesars Indiana, E.ON U.S., Meijer, UPS	850,000	62,000	WDRB
2008	"Out of This World"	Horseshoe Casino and Hotel, E.ON U.S., Meijer, UPS	350,000	35,000+	WDRB
2009	"Thunder Road"	Horseshoe Casino and Hotel, E.ON U.S., Meijer, UPS	700,000	N/A	WHAS
2010	"Thunder Fever"	Horseshoe Casino and Hotel, E.ON U.S., Meijer, UPS	700,000	56,215	WAVE
2011	"Thunder Power"	Horseshoe Southern Indiana, LG&E, Meijer, UPS	300,000	N/A	WLKY
2012	"A Star-Spangled Blast"	Horseshoe Southern Indiana, LG&E, Meijer, UPS	700,000	50,000	WDRB
2013	"Thunder Vision"	Horseshoe Southern Indiana, LG&E, Meijer, UPS	500,000	56,000+	WHAS
2014	"Throwback Thunder"	Horseshoe Southern Indiana, LG&E, Meijer, UPS	675,000	54,000+	WAVE
2015	"Boom with a View"	Horseshoe Southern Indiana, LG&E, Meijer, UPS	650,000	56,000	WLKY
2016	"No Strings Attached"	Horseshoe Southern Indiana, KentuckyOne Health, LG&E, Meijer, UPS, Valero	725,000	N/A	WDRB, AFN
2017	"Thunder: Local and Original"	Horseshoe Southern Indiana, KentuckyOne Health, LG&E, Meijer, UPS, Valero	725,000	N/A	WHAS, AFN
2018	"A Disco Thunder"	Horseshoe Southern Indiana, KentuckyOne Health, LG&E, Meijer, UPS, Valero	800,000	N/A	WLKY, AFN
2019	"The Wonderful World of Thunder"	Horseshoe Southern Indiana, KentuckyOne Health, LG&E, Meijer, UPS	700,000	60,000	WAVE, AFN
2020	Cancelled due to the COVID-19 pandemic				
2021	"Illuminating Our Community"	Caesars Southern Indiana, Ford, GE, LG&E, Meijer, Papa John's, UPS		N/A	WHAS, AFN
2022	"The Legend Returns: USAF 75th Anniversary"	Caesars Southern Indiana, Ford, GE, Humana, LG&E, Meijer, Papa John's, UPS	851,000	N/A	WLKY, AFN
2023	"Through the Decades"	Caesars Southern Indiana, Ford, GE, Humana, LG&E, Meijer, Papa John's, UPS		N/A	WAVE, AFN
2024	"Celebrating Derby 150"	Caesars Southern Indiana, Humana, LG&E, Meijer, UPS		N/A	WDRB, AFN
2025	Cancelled due to flooding				
2026	"Thunder in the U.S.A."	Caesars Southern Indiana, Ford Motor Company, LG&E, Meijer, UA Local 502, UPS	TBA	N/A	WLKY, AFN

== Weather ==
Due to the complexity of the event, including road closures, police presence, and technical requirements, there is no rain date for Thunder. The event was canceled in 2025 due to flooding. Officials would cancel if severe weather or lightning was imminent, and the fireworks could be delayed if heavy rain or wind was occurring at the time of the show.

In 2005, unseasonably cold weather brought a temperature of 38 at 8:30 pm, an hour before the fireworks. A brief downpour of heavy sleet cleared all but an estimated 10,000 spectators from the riverfront by fireworks time.

In 2011, temperatures in the 40s caused a much lower attendance than usual.

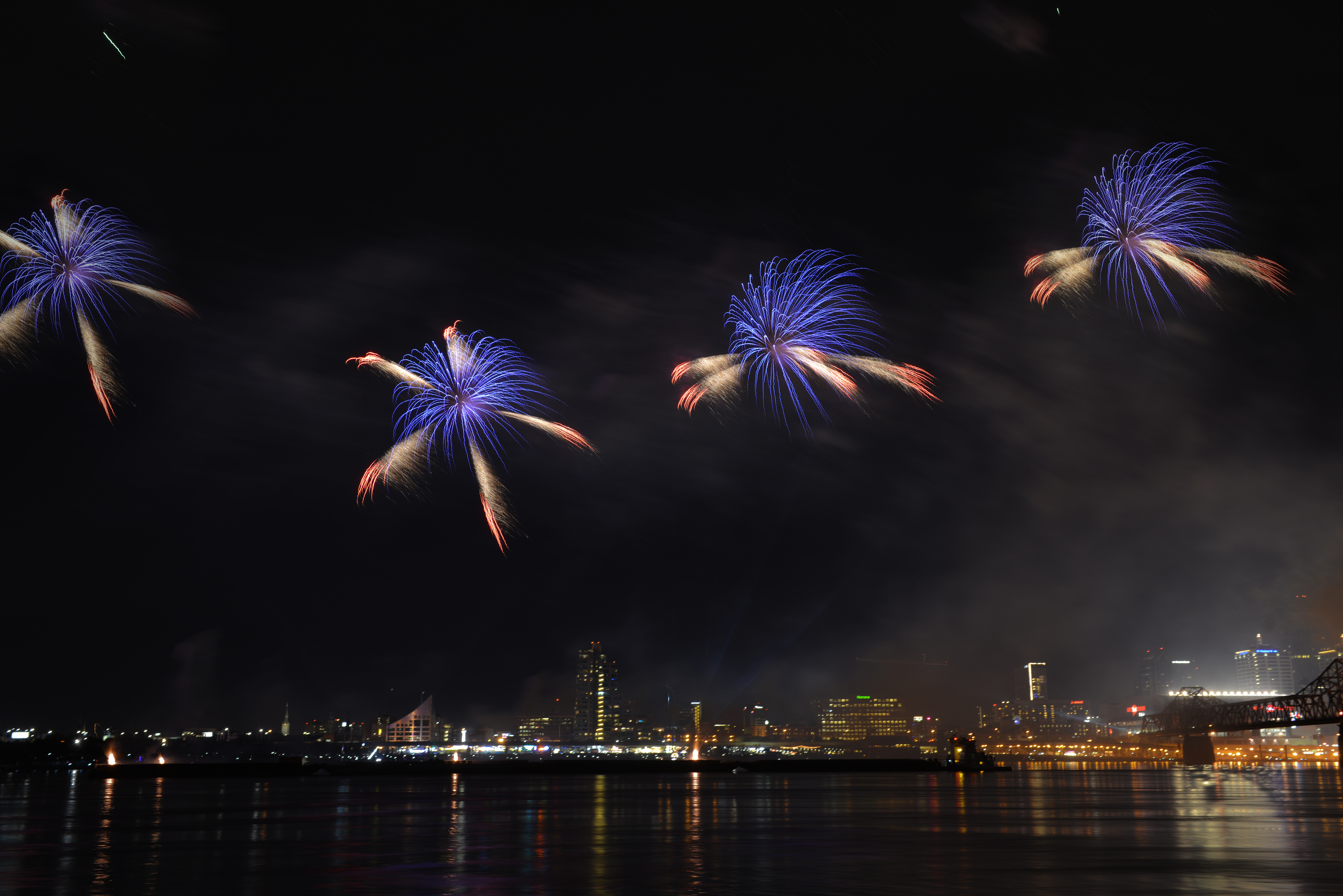
2018 show from the downstream side of the bridge on the Indiana shore of the Ohio River

Ohio River flooding was a concern for the 2015 event, but organizers did not let the high water cancel the festivities. It did make some traditional viewing areas inaccessible and additional safety precautions had to be taken to make the show possible.

The warmest Thunder Over Louisville on record happened in 2022 when Louisville hit a high of 87 degrees.

== TV coverage ==
Thunder Over Louisville has been televised locally since its first year. The 2007 show was the first to be broadcast entirely in HDTV. Previously, two or three HDTV cameras supplemented the broadcast. TV coverage of the fireworks received record ratings in 2006 due to cold temperatures which made many people choose to watch the show from home.

In 2005, The Kentucky Derby Festival started rotating the broadcast rights each year between 3 of the major Louisville network affiliates (WAVE-TV, WDRB, and WLKY). After airing the coverage exclusively from 1991 to 2003, WHAS-TV chose not to participate in the rotation for several years after this agreement was made. They have since entered the rotation. The show is traditionally rebroadcast on the 4th of July, on the U.S. military's American Forces Network.

== See also ==
- List of attractions and events in the Louisville metropolitan area
- Great Steamboat Race
