= Transportation in Louisville, Kentucky =

As with most American cities, transportation in Louisville, Kentucky, is based primarily on automobiles. However, the city traces its foundation to the era where the river was the primary means of transportation, and railroads have been an important part of local industry for over a century. In more recent times Louisville has become a national hub for air cargo, creating over 20,000 local jobs. The city has also launched several initiatives to promote both utilitarian and recreational bicycling. In 2016 Walk Score ranked Louisville 43rd "most walkable" of 141 U.S. cities with a population greater than 200,000. In 2015, 11.7 percent of Louisville households were without a car, which decreased to 10.9 percent in 2016. The national average was 8.7 percent in 2016. Louisville averaged 1.61 cars per household in 2016, compared to a national average of 1.8 per household.

== Roads ==
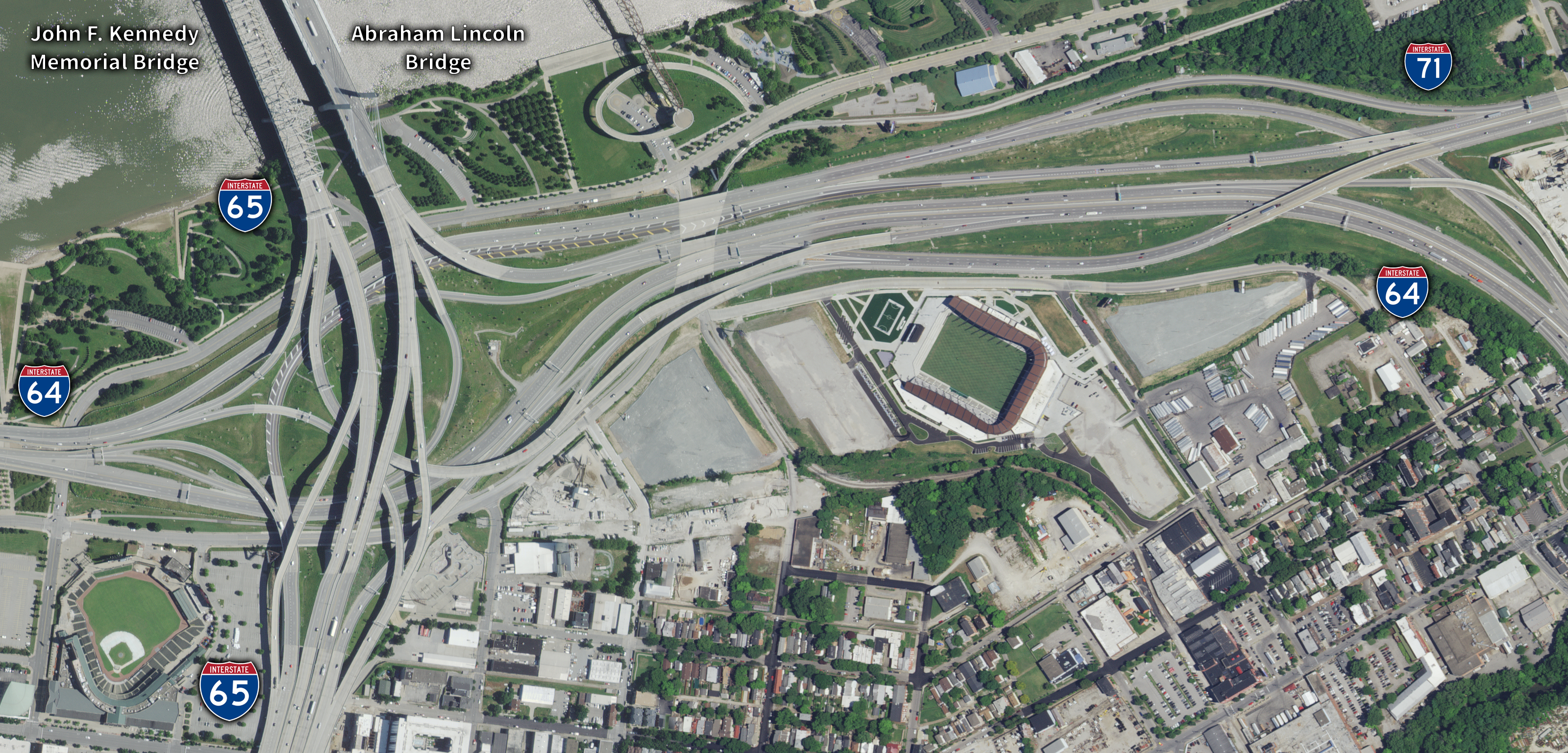
Diagram of the Kennedy Interchange ("Spaghetti Junction")

The city's road system is arranged in a fairly typical system common to many cities in the United States. Streets in the downtown business district are arranged as a grid, with several alternating one-way streets. Many major roads begin at or near the downtown area and travel outwards from the city like the spokes of a wheel. There are also several roads, such as Bardstown Road and Shelbyville Road, which lead outwards from Louisville to the outlying Kentucky towns of Bardstown and Shelbyville, respectively. (See External links for links to several online maps.)

Interstates I-64, I-65 pass through and I-71 begins in Louisville. Since all three of these highways intersect at virtually the same location in the city just east of Downtown, this spot has become known as "Spaghetti Junction", as the large mass of highways and exits resembles a bowl of spaghetti when viewed from the air. Louisville Waterfront Park is built under and near this interchange.

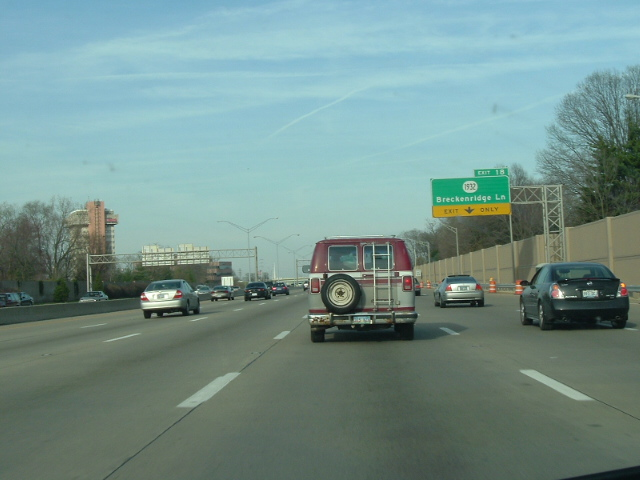
The Watterson Expressway

I-264 (Henry Watterson Expressway east of US 31W and Shawnee Expressway west of US 31W) and I-265 (Gene Snyder Freeway) form loops around the city on the Kentucky side. Louisville is the only city in the nation to contain two consecutively numbered, three-digit Interstate highways.

The Ohio River Bridges Project, a plan under consideration for decades to construct two new interstate bridges over the Ohio River to connect Louisville to Indiana, including a reconfiguration of Spaghetti Junction, began construction in 2012. The first bridge to open, initially dubbed the "Downtown Crossing" and later named the Abraham Lincoln Bridge, is located beside the existing Kennedy Bridge for relief of I-65 traffic. The second, initially dubbed the "East End Crossing" and later named the Lewis and Clark Bridge, connects I-265 between the portions located in southeast Clark County, Indiana and northeast Jefferson County, Kentucky (Louisville Metro).

== Airports ==
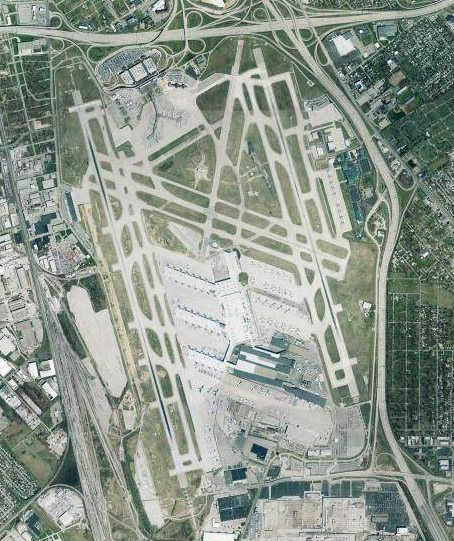
Louisville International Airport

Louisville's main airport is the centrally located Louisville Muhammad Ali International Airport, whose IATA Airport Code (SDF) reflects its former name of Standiford Field, although locally, this name is still widely used. The airport is also home to the UPS Worldport. The first runway was constructed in 1941 and used for World War II aircraft, and the airport opened for business on November 15, 1947.

In 2019, SDF had its busiest year on record, with over 4.2 million passengers passing through the airport. As of 2021 it ranks as the 71st busiest airport in terms of passenger travel in the United States; however it is the third busiest airport in the United States in terms of cargo traffic, and sixth busiest for such in the world as of 2021. Over 17.5 billion pounds or 7.9 million metric tonnes of landed cargo weight passed through the airport in 2021.

The airport, having recently completed major terminal renovations, has three operational runways. The two parallel main runways run north–south and allow for simultaneous takeoffs and landings. The east–west runway is shorter and generally only used in adverse weather conditions.

The much smaller Bowman Field is used mainly for general aviation. Bowman Field, which opened in 1921, was the city's first airport. Some business aviation, as well as flight instruction and other private flying primarily operate out of this field.

== Waterways ==
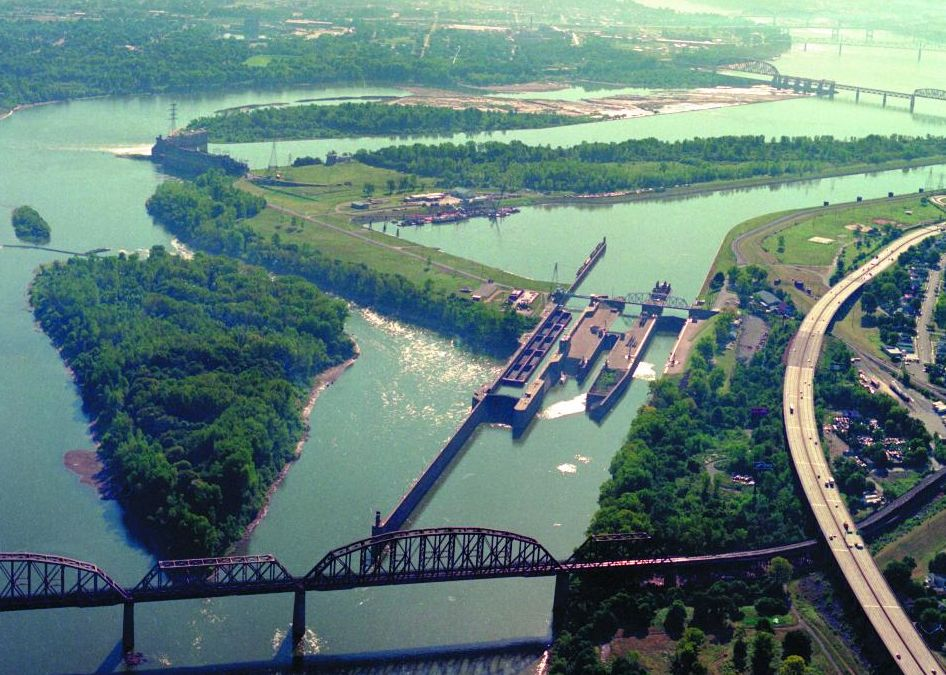
The McAlpine Locks and Dam

The McAlpine Locks and Dam is located on the Kentucky side of the Ohio River, near the downtown area. The locks were constructed to allow shipping past the Falls of the Ohio. In 2001 over 55 million tons of commodities passed through the locks. A new lock was constructed to replace two of the auxiliary locks, with a projected completion date of 2008, but was completed in early 2009.

Ferry Service connected Louisville to Southern Indiana for decades, but was made obsolete when the Clark Memorial Bridge was opened.

== Public transit ==
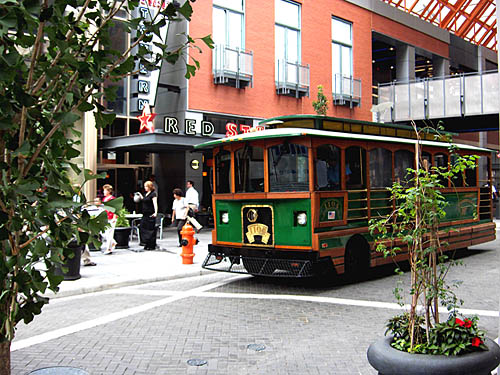
The Toonerville II Trolleys provide transportation throughout downtown Louisville as well as the Bardstown Road corridor.

Public transportation includes buses and chartered vans run by the Transit Authority of River City (TARC). TARC has an extensive network serving downtown Louisville and Jefferson County, as well as the Indiana suburbs of Jeffersonville, Clarksville and New Albany. In addition to regular city buses, transit throughout the downtown hotel and shopping districts is served by a series of motorized trolleys known as the Toonerville II Trolley.

Louisville has an intercity bus service as well, provided by Megabus and Greyhound. Departures are from the Louisville Civic Center.

Louisville has several multi-use trails for bikes and pedestrians. However, many are not connected to each other and cannot be used to traverse the city. In the central city, there are several on-road bike paths that help cyclists get around the city.

Like most cities, Louisville was served by electric streetcars into the 20th century. The last streetcars ran on May 1, 1948, carrying passengers to and from the Kentucky Derby.

A light rail system has been studied and proposed for the city, but no plan was in development as of 2007.

== Rail ==
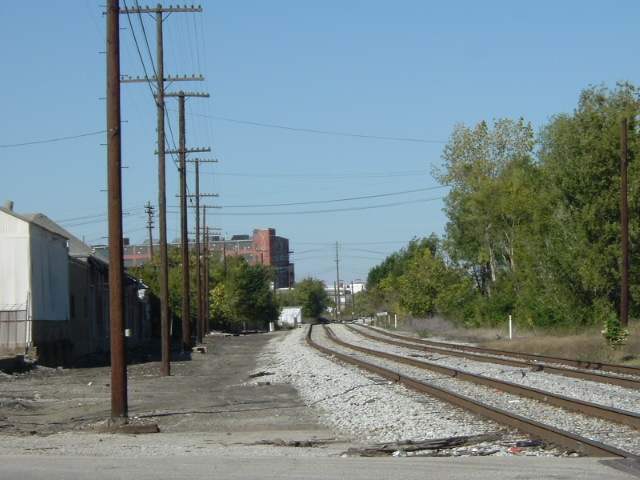
RR tracks in Old Louisville

Louisville has historically been a major center for railway traffic. The Louisville and Nashville Railroad was once headquartered here, before it was purchased by CSX Transportation. Central Station, Southern Station and Union Station hosted numerous train companies with passenger service passing through the city. Today the city is served by two major freight railroads, CSX (with a major classification yard in the southern part of the metro area) and Norfolk Southern. Five major main lines connect Louisville to the rest of the region. Two regional railroads, the Paducah & Louisville Railway and the Louisville and Indiana Railroad, also serve the city. With the discontinuance of the short-lived Kentucky Cardinal in 2003, Amtrak passenger trains no longer serve Louisville; it is thus the fifth largest city in the country (behind Phoenix, Columbus, Las Vegas, and Nashville) with no Amtrak service.

== Bikeways ==
In March 2007, Mayor Jerry Abramson delivered a keynote address at the League of American Bicyclists' National Bike Summit in Washington D.C. where he described the history and future of bicycling in Louisville.

The city is developing on-street bike lanes and shared-lanes, as well as a one-hundred mile "Metro Loop" trail to encircle the entire county. By the end of 2007, nearly 1/3 of this loop was scheduled to be complete, with another 1/3 to 1/2 coming in the next three to five years as part of the Floyd's Fork corridor project. The project was overseen by the City of Parks initiative, and $38 million in U.S. Federal Government funding was secured for the Floyd's Fork portion of this project alone, with another $20 million in private funding.

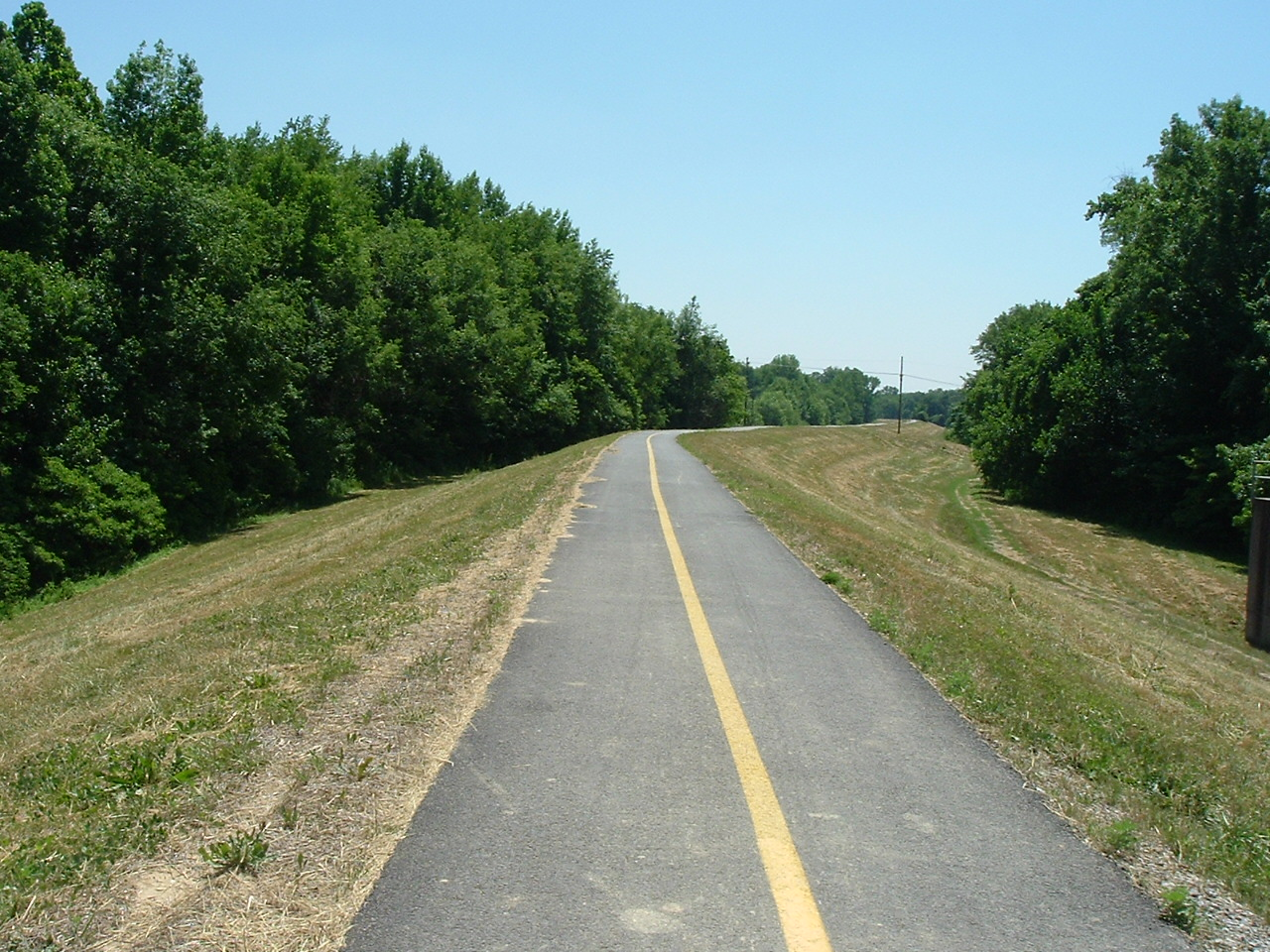
A recently completed section of a planned 110 mile bike trail around the city

In 2006, Louisville was named a "Bronze-Level Bicycle Friendly Community" by the League of American Bicyclists in recognition of development of bicycling infrastructure and promoting bicycling education and awareness.

A $65 million redesign of Westport Road provided bike lanes only a third of the way, and did not connect residential areas like St. Matthews with suburban retail areas. Mayor Abramson said that the city's bike path offerings were an "urban planning mistake".

== See also ==
- Transportation in Kentucky
- Kentucky Transportation Cabinet
- Plug-in electric vehicles in Kentucky § Louisville
