= Sherman Minton Bridge =

Double-deck through arch bridge spanning the Ohio River at Louisville, carrying I-64

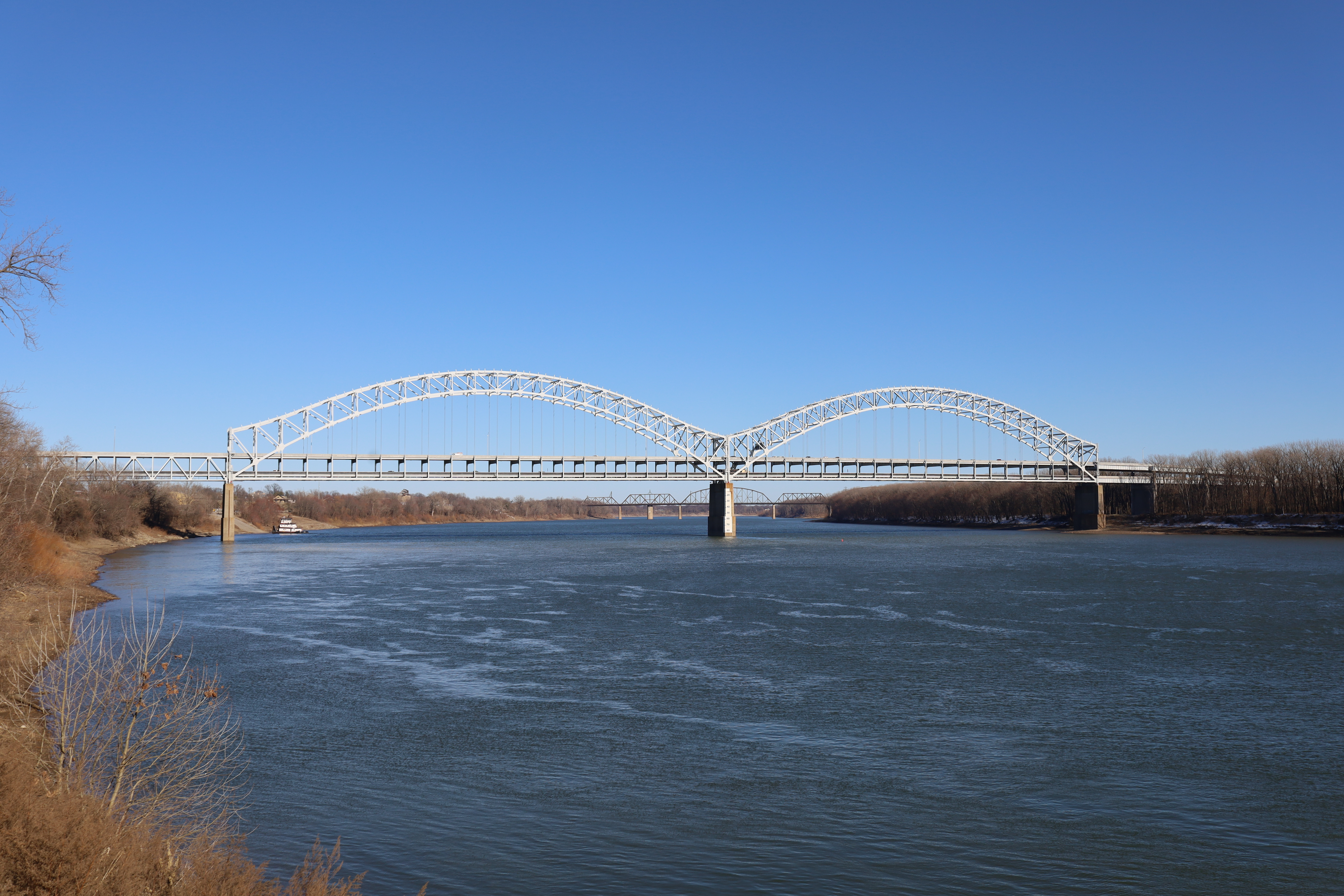
- The bridge in 2025
- Coordinates: 38°16′42.44″N 85°49′19.34″W
- Carries: 6 lanes (3 upper, 3 lower) of I-64 / US 150
- Crosses: Ohio River
- Locale: Louisville, Kentucky and New Albany, Indiana
- Maintained by: Indiana Department of Transportation

Characteristics
- Design: Double-decked twin tied-arch bridge
- Total length: 2,052.9 ft (625.7 m)
- Width: 42 ft (13 m)
- Longest span: 800 ft (240 m)
- Clearance above: 16.3 ft (5.0 m)

History
- Opened: December 22, 1961 (lower deck) September 1, 1962 (upper deck)

Statistics
- Daily traffic: 68,000/day

Location
- Interactive map of Sherman Minton Bridge

The Sherman Minton Bridge is a double-deck through arch bridge spanning the Ohio River, carrying I-64 and US 150 over the river between Kentucky and Indiana. The bridge connects the west side of Louisville, Kentucky to downtown New Albany, Indiana.

== Description ==
The bridge is a double-deck configuration—westbound traffic from Kentucky to Indiana travels on the upper deck of the bridge, while eastbound traffic from Indiana into Kentucky travels on the lower deck of the bridge. It is of similar construction to the Hernando de Soto Bridge in Memphis, Tennessee (with the primary difference being that the de Soto Bridge is single-deck).

The steel used was T1 steel, which in the early 1960s was "innovative material" but is much weaker than modern steel. Classification of the bridge is "fracture critical" because if one part of the bridge should fail, the entire bridge could be at risk.

== History ==
=== Planning and construction ===
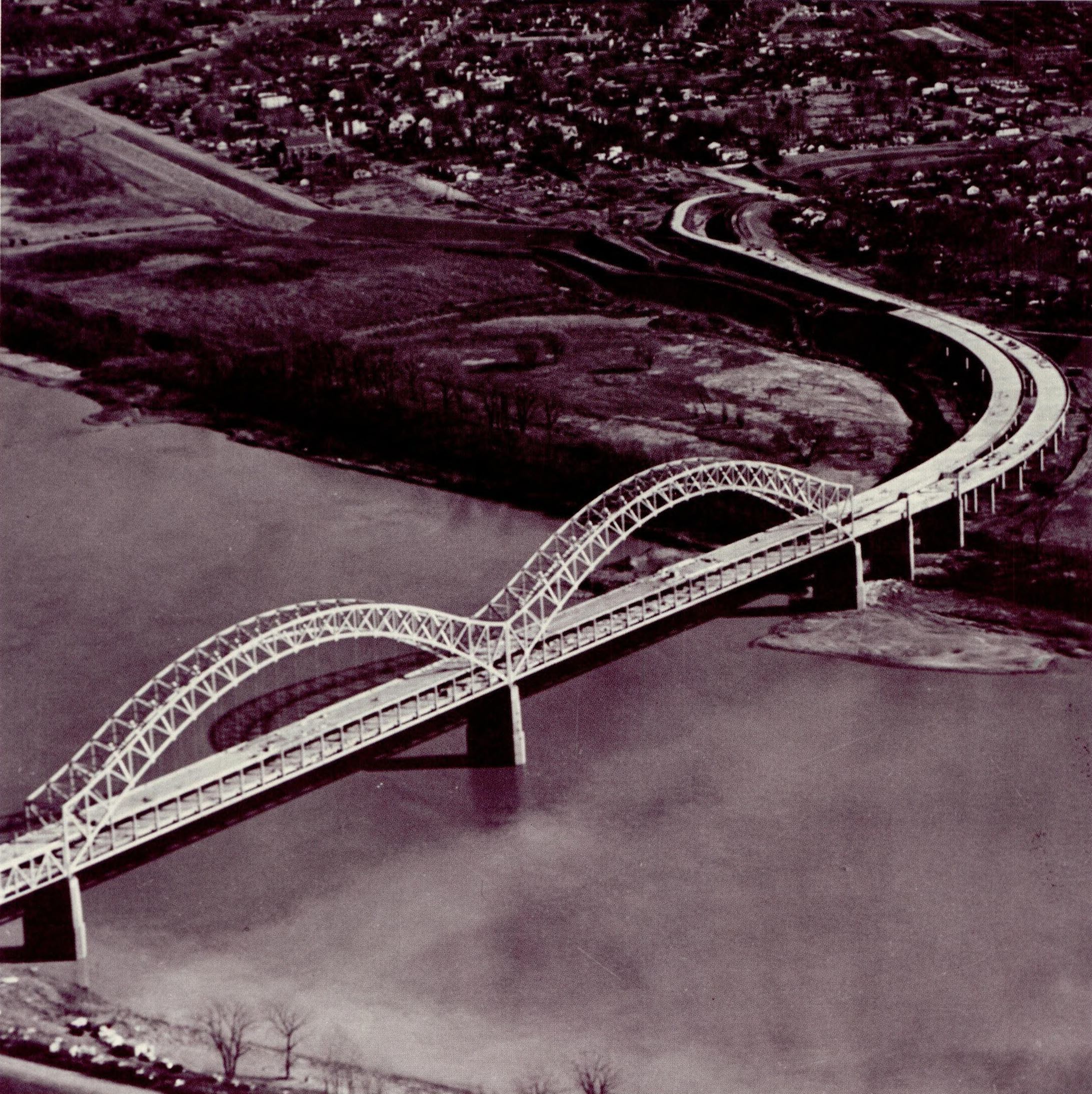
The bridge prior to 1977

In 1952 the Second Street Bridge was reaching peak traffic, and the K&I Bridge faring similarly. Arthur W. Grafton commissioned two studies in 1952 and 1953, with their results being a need for two bridges in Louisville; one crossing to Jeffersonville, Indiana, and the other to New Albany.

Hoosiers as far as Scottsburg, Indiana (30 miles (48 km) away) were vastly against making any bridges toll, and many residents of Louisville were against toll bridges as well. When the Interstate Highway System was announced by President Dwight D. Eisenhower, the solution became clear. The Federal government would finance 90% of both bridges, with Indiana paying 10% of the New Albany bridge, and Kentucky paying 10% of the Jeffersonville bridge.

The New Albany bridge was given to Hazelet & Erdal, of Louisville to design in 1956. Construction began in June 1959. The lower deck was dedicated and opened on December 22, 1961, by Indiana Governor Matthew Welsh and Kentucky Governor Bert T. Combs. It was built at a cost of $14.8 million.

At the time it was dedicated, it was named the Louisville–New Albany Bridge. New Albany Mayor C. Pralle Erni suggested to Indiana State Senator Clifford H. Maschmeyer of Clarksville to name the new bridge for the former United States Senator and Supreme Court justice Sherman Minton. On April 4, 1962, Indiana governor Matthew E. Welsh made the formal announcement that it would be named for Minton, who was a native of New Albany.

The upper deck was completed on September 1, 1962, and opened that day at 11:00 AM without ceremonies. The American Institute of Steel Construction in 1961 named it the most beautiful long-span bridge of the year.

=== Late 20th century ===
On February 5, 2009, a fifteen container coal barge lost power and was pushed downstream by the current and struck the bridge's central pier. The Indiana Department of Transportation (INDOT) closed the bridge for several hours while it was inspected for damage. When no damage was found, the bridge was reopened later the same day.

=== Closure of 2011–2012 ===
On September 9, 2011, Indiana Governor Mitch Daniels ordered the bridge closed. This was done after construction crews found cracks in the main load-bearing structural element. Experts from INDOT, the Kentucky Transportation Cabinet (KYTC), the Federal Highway Administration (FHWA), and private engineering firms and academic institutions participated in determining the severity of this crack and others found on the bridge, and determine whether the bridge could be saved.

It was initially feared the bridge would remain closed from several months to up to 3 years, and that the entire span would have to be either completely replaced or extensively renovated before the Sherman Minton Bridge could reopen to traffic. However, engineers determined the crack that initiated the bridge closure dated back to the bridge's original construction in the 1960s, but had not been discovered until the summer of 2011 because another structural component was covering it. On September 23, 2011, Kentucky Governor Steve Beshear and US Secretary of Transportation Ray LaHood announced the 2.5-inch crack has been repaired, but the bridge would remain closed until crews completed an inspection of the remainder of the bridge. Five to seven additional cracks were discovered during the following inspection in welded areas in a load-bearing steel beam. "The fissures were discovered in a type of steel frequently used in the 1950s and 1960s that is now known to be susceptible to cracking. ...". This necessitated the bridge being closed for an extended period of time for repairs. Repairs cost $20 million and ultimately took four months to complete.

In a news release from the Indiana Department of Transportation, dated October 18, 2011, Governor Mitch Daniels announced that Louisville based Hall Contracting of Kentucky had been awarded the repairs contract in the amount of $13.9 million. A time frame of 135 work days was announce with an incentive of $100,000 per day to finish early. Likewise, a penalty of $100,000 would be deducted from the contract payments for each day over. Repair cost were covered by the Federal Highway Administration, who announced on September 30, 2011, that it would contribute 25% of the cost, with the remaining 75% being equally split between Indiana and Kentucky.

The contract attached 1,200 short tons (1,100 t) of reinforcing steel plating along both sides of the bridge ties spanning 1,600 feet (490 m). The repairs along with regular maintenance increased the bridge's safety and reliability and extend its useful life by at least 20 years.

Repairs were completed and the Sherman Minton Bridge reopened at 11:50 pm on February 17, 2012.

=== Impact of Ohio River Bridges Project ===
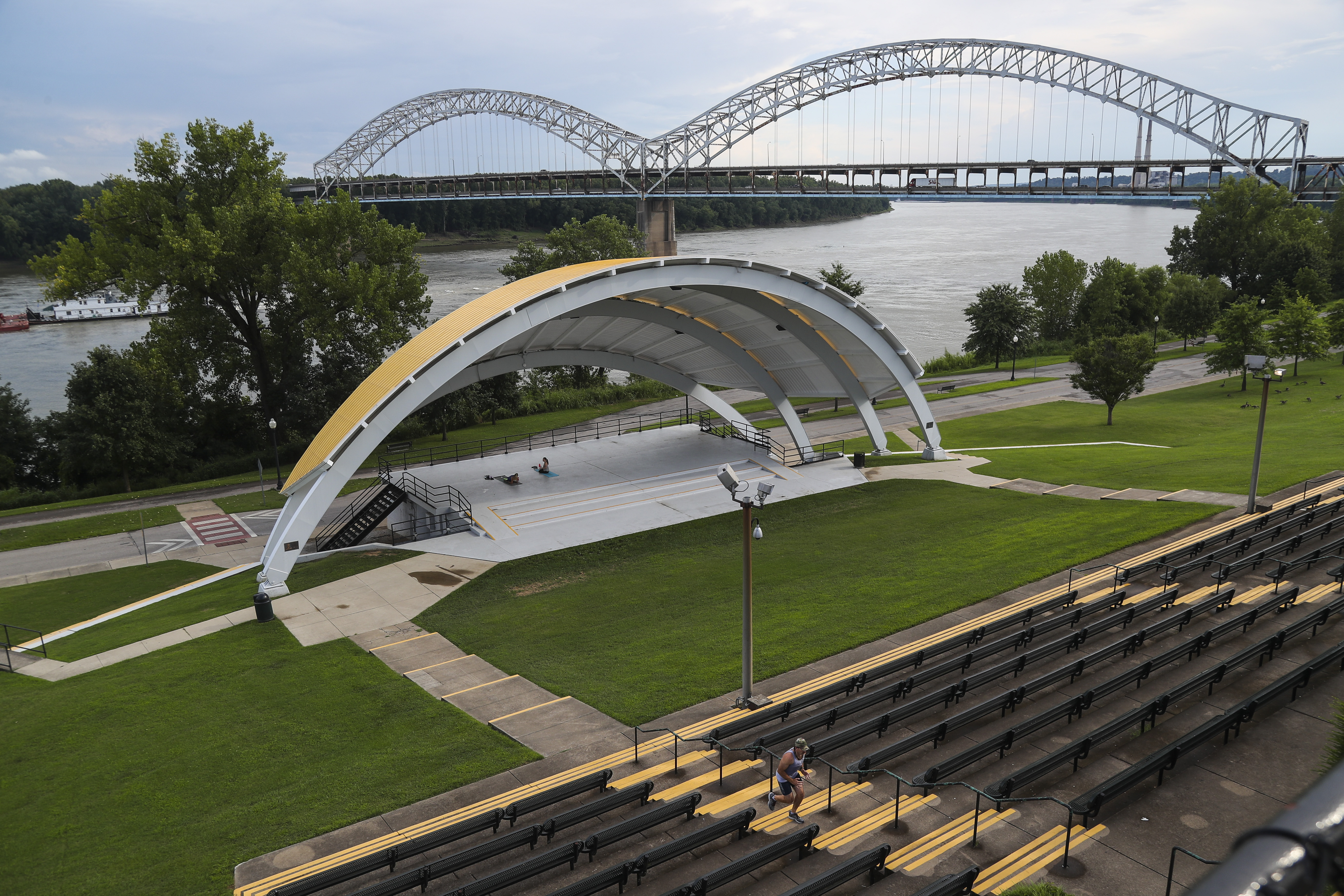
The bridge behind the New Albany Riverfront's amphitheater in 2020

The bridge has been expected to see major increases in traffic following the completion of the Ohio River Bridges Project at the end of 2016. The project included repurposing the John F. Kennedy Memorial Bridge, which previously carried I-65 in both directions, for southbound traffic only; building the new Abraham Lincoln Bridge for northbound I-65 traffic; and building the Lewis and Clark Bridge to connect I-265 in the two states. The two I-65 crossings and the I-265 bridge are tolled to pay for the project, leaving the Sherman Minton as the only free interstate-quality river crossing in the Louisville area. One consultant who worked on a transportation study for the Kentucky government predicted that traffic on the Sherman Minton would increase by nearly 40% once tolling on the other bridges started.

== See also ==
- List of crossings of the Ohio River
- List of bridges in the United States
- Ohio River Bridges Project
- List of longest arch bridge spans
- Cityscape of Louisville, Kentucky
