= River Fields =

Ohio River advocacy group

River Fields, incorporated in 1959 as a not-for-profit land trust in Louisville, Kentucky, has become the largest and oldest river conservancy advocacy group along the Ohio River to effectively protect, preserve and enhance the river front's natural and cultural resources. River Fields is the ninth oldest conservation organization in the United States. River Fields currently owns land or holds conservation easements on 33 properties, totaling more than 2,200 acres. River Fields is one of the nation's few land trusts tackling regional advocacy work as well as land conservation.

== History ==
In 1959, land conservation and environmental advocacy were not yet priorities for the average citizen. Fifty years ago, the late Archibald Cochran and Mrs. W.L. Lyons Brown invited a group of like-minded citizens, who shared a common interest in preserving the integrity of the Ohio River and its corridor, to form the Louisville Area River Foundation, Inc. In 1969, this group was renamed River Fields, Inc.

== Mission and vision ==
=== Mission ===
River Fields' mission is to protect, preserve, and enhance natural and cultural resources on both sides of the Ohio River between Westport and West Point, KY, and the region, for the benefit of the public.

=== Vision ===
River Fields envisions that the natural and cultural environment of the Ohio River, and its corridor, is revered and enjoyed by the citizens of the region.

== Land conservation ==
Since its inception, River Fields has worked successfully with landowners and supporters to preserve thousands of acres of open space, farms, woodlands and wetlands along the Ohio River Corridor and watershed.

Currently, it owns 10 river corridor properties, totaling about 62 acres. These properties are critical to protect the region's natural, cultural and historic landscape. Our largest property, Garvin Brown Preserve, is open to the public year-round.

In addition, through conservation easements, River Fields holds development rights to 23 additional properties in metro Louisville and surrounding counties. These easements protect nearly 2,130 acres of land, including sensitive wetlands and watersheds, beautiful scenic vistas and historic properties, as well as wildlife habitats and working farms.

=== Garvin Brown Preserve ===
Garvin Brown Preserve, a 46-acre nature preserve that is owned and preserved by River Fields in Prospect, Kentucky, is open to the public year-round from dawn until dusk daily.

== Advocacy ==
Since River Fields' founding, it has advocated for the protection of land and water resources in balance with responsible growth in the region. River Fields seeks solutions that promote responsible growth, including planned development, growth management, greater public access, environmental and historic preservation, enhancement of scenic views, urban design, and transportation reform.

=== Bridges Project and settlement agreement ===
The Ohio River Bridges Project is the largest capital project ever undertaken in the Commonwealth of Kentucky and one of the largest transportation projects in the nation. River Fields has monitored the project for more than two decades. River Fields favored addressing cross-river mobility issues by building a downtown bridge and making improvements to the Kennedy Interchange. River Fields opposed the proposed eastern bridge on environmental grounds.

In 2009, The National Trust for Historic Preservation and River Fields filed a lawsuit arguing that project leaders had not followed federal law. The suit was settled in January 2013.

As a result of the suit there was:

- Confirmation that the two bridges would be built simultaneously.
- Funding for historic preservation projects on both sides of the Ohio River.
- Increased public involvement in the ongoing process of building the spans, as well as further safeguards against damage during the construction process for the area's natural, cultural, and historic resources.

River Fields has developed collaborative relationships with government agencies at the local, state and national levels. River Fields works closely with key agencies such as Louisville Metro Planning and Design Services, the U.S. Army Corps of Engineers, U.S. Fish and Wildlife Service, the Kentucky Transportation Cabinet, and the State Historic Preservation Offices of Kentucky and Indiana, as well as a number of other organizations throughout the Ohio River Corridor.

== Education ==
One of River Fields' key goals is to educate the public on the importance and need of conservation easements and on issues that affect the river corridor. To accomplish this, they inform and work closely with local citizen's organizations, decision makers, and the news media. River Fields keeps area residents informed about critical topics that impact the river and region.

== Partners ==
- National Trust for Historic Preservation
- The Cultural Landscape Foundation
- Land Trust Alliance
- The Kentucky Heritage Council, State Historic Preservation Office
- Preservation Louisville
