= 8664 =

Highway removal campaign in Louisville, Kentucky, USA

- Logo
- Formation: 2005
- Headquarters: Louisville, Kentucky
- Co-founders: J.C. Stites; Tyler Allen
- Website: 8664.org

8664 was a grassroots campaign based in Louisville, Kentucky, that aimed "to advocate for the revitalization of Louisville through the removal of Interstate 64 (I-64) along the riverfront and the adoption of a transportation plan that will provide long-term benefits to the region's citizens, neighborhoods, environment and economy".

The movement wanted to alter plans for Louisville's interstates, which are formally referred to as the Ohio River Bridges Project, with three major components:

1. Build the East End bridge as set forth in the Ohio River Bridges Project
2. Realign I-64 onto I-265 using the new bridge, with the remaining parts of I-64 redesignated as I-364
3. Replace the Riverside Expressway from I-65 to 22nd Street with an Olmsted-styled parkway, similar to already existing roads like Eastern Parkway in Louisville.

8664 proponents hoped the implementation of their plan would expand interest in Louisville's waterfront and reduce the need for a new downtown bridge, which would negatively impact Butchertown and the Old Jeffersonville Historic District in Jeffersonville, Indiana. 8664's plan would also have involved the extension of city's Waterfront Park to the west of downtown Louisville.

Over 11,000 supporters signed up on the 8664 website.

== History ==
The elimination of the I-64 section was proposed in 1999 by the president and CEO of Greater Louisville Inc. Doug Cobb but it gained little attention at the time.

Louisville businessmen Tyler Allen and J.C. Stites co-founded the 8664 campaign in 2005. Allen talked to several government agencies to support the movement, including communities that would not be immediately affected by new bridges. The campaign presented several annual public meetings with presentations from transportation officials and activists.

On October 31, 2007, a committee of the Louisville Metro Council announced it would be holding public hearings on the 8664 plan.

In 2009, Tyler Allen left the campaign to run for Mayor of Louisville in 2010.

== Criticism ==
Critics believed the 8664 campaign's proposal would have created red tape through the federal government. Other critics believed the plan was "too little, too late". Louisville mayor Jerry Abramson referred to proponents of the 8664 plan as "young idealists". The 1999 proponent Doug Cobb dismissed the plan as a "paper dream".

== See also ==
- Abraham Lincoln Bridge, the downtown bridge 8664 opposed building
