= Ohio River Bridges Project =

Transportation project

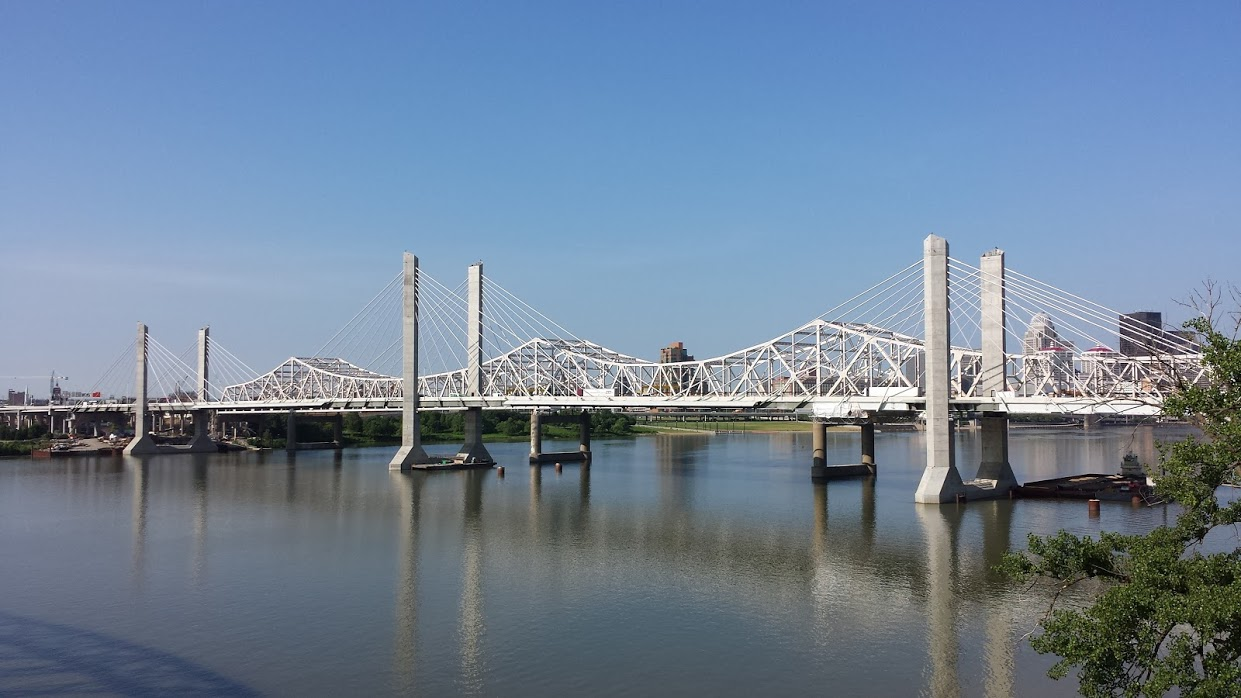
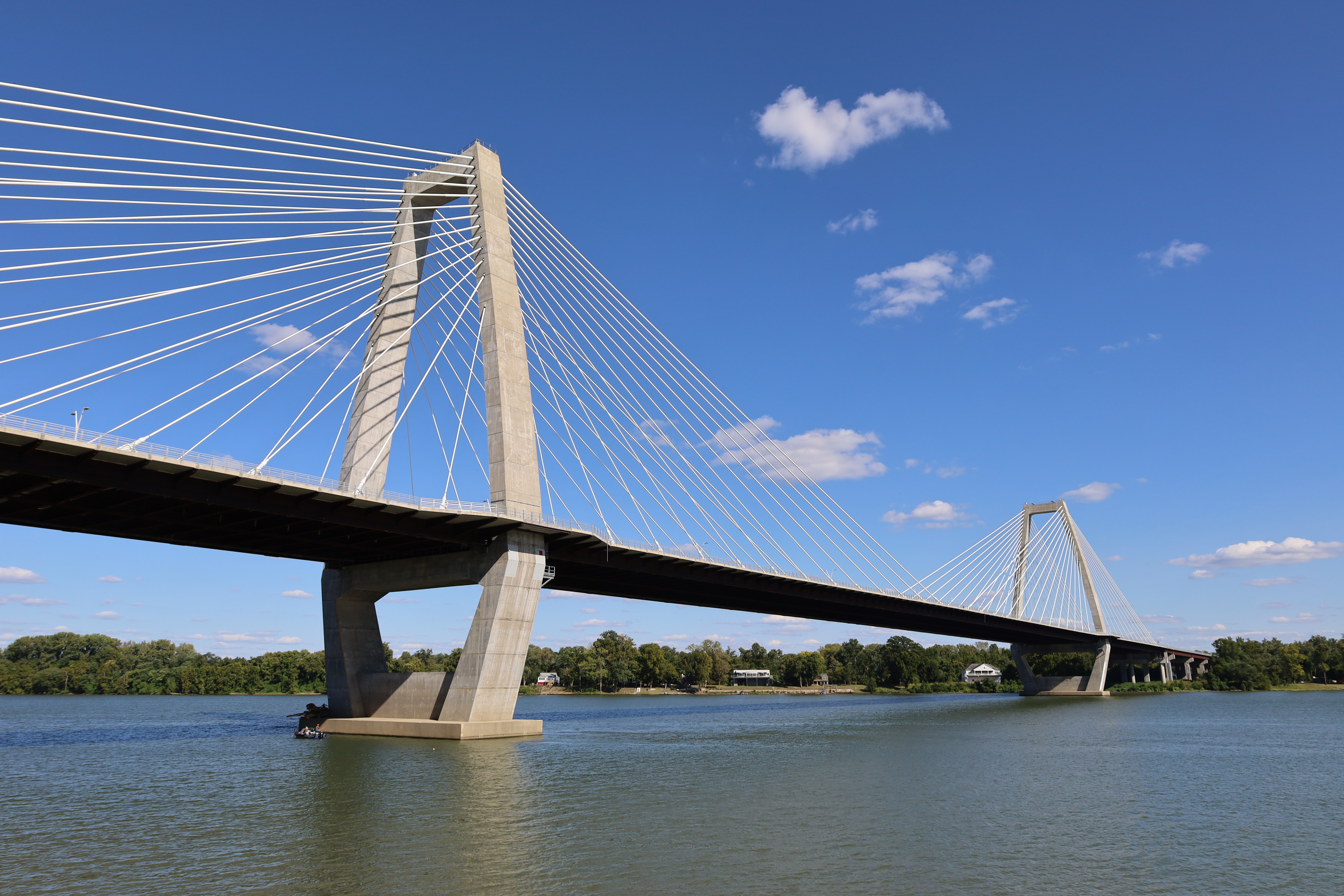
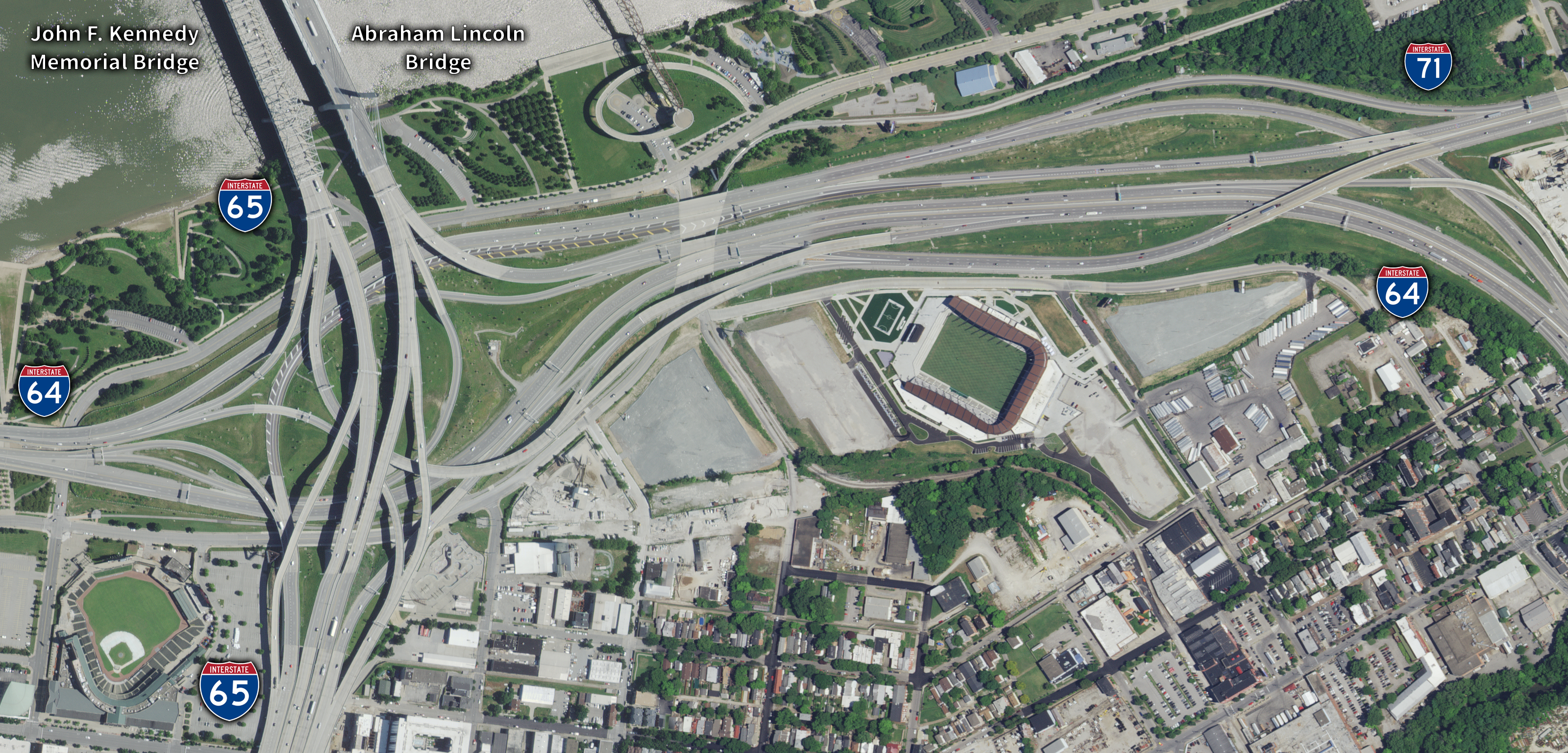
- Main components of ORBP Abraham Lincoln Bridge construction and John F. Kennedy Memorial Bridge redecking Lewis and Clark Bridge construction Kennedy Interchange reconstruction
- Location: Louisville, Kentucky and Clark County, Indiana
- Country: United States
- Established: July 26, 2002
- Status: Complete
- Website: kyinbridges.com

The Ohio River Bridges Project (ORBP) was a 2002–2016 transportation project in the Louisville metropolitan area primarily involving the construction of two Interstate highway bridges across the Ohio River and the reconstruction of the Kennedy Interchange (locally known as "Spaghetti Junction") near downtown Louisville.

The Abraham Lincoln Bridge, an urban span carrying northbound traffic on I-65 from downtown Louisville to Jeffersonville, Indiana, opened December 2015; it is slightly upstream from the John F. Kennedy Memorial Bridge that had been completed in 1963 and was redecked for this project to handle southbound traffic. A suburban span, the Lewis and Clark Bridge (called the East End Bridge during planning), opened in December 2016 and connects the Indiana and Kentucky segments of I-265 between Prospect, Kentucky (far eastern Jefferson County), and Utica, Indiana. Additionally completed were reconstructed ramps on I-65 between Muhammad Ali Boulevard and downtown Louisville, as well as a new underground tunnel and freeway extensions to complete connections to the Lewis and Clark Bridge.

On July 26, 2002, the two governors of Kentucky and Indiana announced that the East End Bridge would be constructed, along with a new I-65 downtown span and a reconstructed Kennedy Interchange, where three interstates connect. The cost of the three projects was to total approximately $2.5 billion, and would be the largest transportation project ever constructed between the two states. An estimated 132 residents and 80 businesses were to be displaced.

The Louisville–Southern Indiana Bridge Authority (LSIBA), a 14-member commission (seven members from Kentucky and seven from Indiana) charged with developing a financial plan and establishing funding mechanisms for construction, was established in October 2009. The LSIBA oversaw construction of the project, and continues to operate and maintain the bridges and collect tolls. Construction began in 2014, with the entire project being completed in late December 2016. Tolling on the bridges is expected to continue through at least 2053.

== Lewis and Clark Bridge ==
The result of many community discussions for over 30 years, the Lewis and Clark Bridge (known as the East End Bridge from its conception until completion of construction) is part of a new 6.5-mile (10.5 km) highway that connects the formerly disjointed sections of I-265 in Indiana and Kentucky. With the new section complete, I-265 forms a 3/4 beltway around the Louisville metropolitan area.

Design A-15 was chosen over six alternatives for the I-265 connection, which includes the Lewis and Clark Bridge. A tunnel for the new highway was constructed under the historic Drumanard Estate in Kentucky because the property is listed on the National Register of Historic Places. The interstate reappears from the tunnel near the Shadow Wood subdivision before crossing Transylvania Beach and the Ohio River. The highway passes north of Utica, Indiana, near the old Indiana Army Ammunition Plant. Construction of an exploratory tunnel under the historic east end property was to begin in summer 2007, but bids were 39% more than the state had expected. Construction of the exploratory tunnel finally started in April 2011.

The design is the result of the $22.1 million, four-year Ohio River Bridges Study, which found that solving the region's traffic congestion would require the construction of two new bridges across the Ohio River and reconstruction of the Kennedy Interchange in downtown Louisville.

Limited land acquisition began in 2004, with the number of homes taken by eminent domain expected to be higher because of development occurring in the route path. 109 residences, most in Clark County, Indiana were displaced, the majority of which were constructed in the year before the route for the I-265 extension was finalized. Half of the Shadow Wood subdivision and two condominium buildings at Harbor of Harrods Creek in Jefferson County, Kentucky, were razed.

The only new interchange along the 6.5-mile (10.5 km) eastern route is in Indiana at Salem Road. That full interchange provides access to the Clark Maritime Center and the old Indiana Army Ammunition Plant, a 10,000-acre (40 km^{2}) site that has been undergoing redevelopment as the River Ridge Commerce Center.

The bridge includes accommodations for pedestrians and bicyclists. Former Indiana Governor Frank O'Bannon said he could not wait for construction to begin, adding, "We'll finally be able to take down that sign at the end of Interstate 265 near the Clark Maritime Center that says 'No Bridge to Kentucky,'" he said to applause.

In September 2005, the Kentucky Transportation Cabinet released plans to reconstruct the U.S. Highway 42 interchange and rebuild the "super-two" roadway from I-71 north to the interchange. The super-two roadway already had a right of way wide enough for a six-lane freeway, although at the time only two lanes worth of space is being used. The incomplete US 42 interchange had been constructed in the early 1960s with the original construction of Interstate 265. The reconstruction of the northern two miles (3.2 km) included the widening of the super-two alignment to six-lanes, the rebuilding and widening of the ramps at US 42, the installation of two traffic signals at the base of the ramps, and stub roadways that would eventually lead into the tunnel under the Drumanard Estate to the immediate north of the interchange.

On July 19, 2006, the final design alternatives for the East End Bridge were announced. The three designs chosen included a cable-stayed bridge with two diamond-shaped towers with the cables reaching to the outside; a cable-stayed two-tower bridge with the towers in the center of the bridge deck and cables reaching to the outside; and a cable-stayed two center towered bridges with the cables extending to the center of the deck. It was also announced that the new bridge would cost $221 million and feature three northbound and three southbound lanes. In 2011, this was scaled back in order to save money by narrowing the bridge deck configuration to have only two lanes in each direction (but with the future ability to re-stripe for three by narrowing shoulders) and by slightly narrowing the pedestrian/bicycle lane, resulting in a total 23 feet (7.0 m) reduction in overall deck width. The bridge opened to the public on December 18, 2016. Tolling began on December 30, 2016.

== Abraham Lincoln Bridge ==
The Abraham Lincoln Bridge, completed in 2015, runs parallel to the John F. Kennedy Memorial Bridge downstream and now carries six lanes of northbound I-65 traffic. Pedestrian and bicycle lanes were in the original plans, but were removed. The existing I-65 Kennedy Memorial Bridge, completed in 1963, was renovated for six lanes of southbound traffic. The Lincoln Bridge opened for northbound traffic only on December 6, 2015, with southbound traffic being rerouted onto it later that month as reconstruction of the Kennedy Bridge began. The Lincoln began carrying northbound traffic only on October 10, 2016, when the Kennedy reopened for southbound I-65 through traffic; the Kennedy itself fully reopened on November 14, 2016.

A Structured Public Involvement protocol developed by K. Bailey and T. Grossardt was used to elicit public preferences for the design of the structure. From spring 2005 to summer 2006, several hundred citizens attended a series of public meetings in Louisville, Kentucky, and Jeffersonville, Indiana, and evaluated a range of bridge design options using 3D visualizations. This public involvement process focused in on designs that the public felt were more suitable, as shown by their polling scores. The SPI public involvement process itself was evaluated by anonymous, real-time citizen polling at the open public meetings.

On July 19, 2006, the final design alternatives for the bridge were announced. The three designs included a three-span arch, a cable-stayed design with three towers, and a cable-stayed type with a single A-shaped support tower. It was also announced that the projected cost for the bridge would be $203 million.

The new structure is the fourth bridge in downtown Louisville, joining the John F. Kennedy Memorial Bridge erected between spring 1961 and late 1963 at a cost of $10 million; the four-lane George Rogers Clark Memorial Bridge, constructed from June 1928 and to October 31, 1929; and the Big Four Bridge, which operated as a railroad bridge from 1895 to 1969 and reopened as a pedestrian bridge in May 2014.

== 2008 report ==
In February 2008, the Kentucky Transportation Cabinet released a study saying that tolls would be a possible part of the new bridges, because there were insufficient federal funds for the $4.1 billion project. The tolling would likely be electronic, without traditional tollbooths, similar to SunPass in Florida. The possibility of tolls was not met with a warm reception; Jeffersonville's city council quickly passed a resolution urging state and federal officials to find other ways to fund the bridges project.

== 2010 financial plan ==
The LSIBA issued the updated financial plan for the Ohio River Bridges project on December 16, 2010. The plan envisioned roughly half of the project's costs being financed through $1.00 tolls on the proposed I-65 (northbound) and I-265 and the existing I-65 (southbound) and I-64 Ohio River crossings in the Louisville area. While the financial plan envisioned construction beginning in the summer of 2012, the plan still required approval from the Federal Highway Administration and Congress before work could begin because the existing I-65 and I-64 bridges were built with federal interstate highway funds.

The Kentucky Public Transportation Infrastructure Authority officially approved of the Commonwealth joining the E-ZPass consortium across 15 states and the Canadian province of Ontario on July 29, 2015. Users have the choice of purchasing a traditional E-ZPass transponder for use throughout E-ZPass states, or a decal applied to the windshield for use by mainly local commuters, while occasional travelers can choose to pay their toll by mail via license plate recognition notices.

== 2011 new issues ==
On September 9, 2011, Kentucky and Indiana officials announced the closure of the Sherman Minton Bridge. Cracks in bridge support beams found during an inspection on that day led to the bridge closure, which transportation officials indicated would last for an undetermined length of time. The bridge is a major connection between Louisville and Southern Indiana and is Interstate 64's pathway between the states.

The bridge reopened shortly before midnight on February 17, 2012, almost two weeks ahead of a deadline imposed by both states for completion of repairs.

== Criticism and alternatives ==
Like other public works projects, criticism and alternatives have sprung up. Criticism has largely centered around land acquisition and routing issues, as well as concerns that the Butchertown neighborhood would lose a significant portion of its historical infrastructure with its absorption into the reconfigured Kennedy Interchange. A notable alternative to a portion of the project plan, 8664, called for I-64 to be rerouted around downtown using I-265 and the new East End Bridge so that I-64 in downtown could be deconstructed, making way for downtown park and business expansion in its place. One notable critic was the non-profit group River Fields.

The safety and cost effectiveness of the 1,720-foot (520 m) East End Tunnel under the Drumanard Estate, a 1920s-era property on the National Register of Historic Places was questioned. It would be the second longest automobile tunnel in Kentucky, after the Cumberland Gap Tunnel, and the longest allowing Hazmat-containing vehicles to pass through unannounced and without escort. The chief of the Harrods Creek, Kentucky, fire department, which would be first responder to any accident, expressed concern that the proposed tunnel would be considerably more dangerous to travel through and with fewer safety precautions.

== See also ==
- List of crossings of the Ohio River
- List of parkways and named highways in Kentucky; nine parkways were formerly tolled under the Turnpike Authority of Kentucky

Contemporary Louisville area projects

- City of Parks
- KFC Yum! Center
