= Butchertown, Louisville =

- Butchertown Historic District
- U.S. National Register of Historic Places
- U.S. Historic district
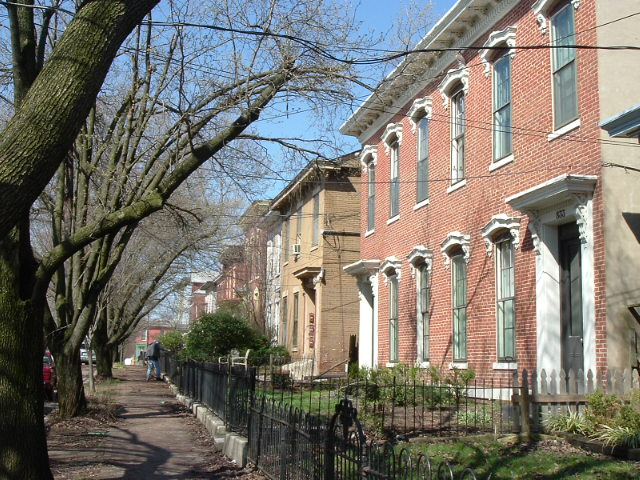
- Washington Street in Butchertown

- Location within Kentucky Location within the United States
- Location: Roughly bounded by Main, Hancock, Geiger, Quincy Sts., US 42, South Fork of Beargrass Creek, and Baxter Ave., Louisville, Kentucky
- Coordinates: 38°15′26.96″N 85°43′41.53″W
- Area: 50 acres (20 ha)
- Built: 1873
- Architect: Adolph Druiding; D.X. Murphy and Company
- Architectural style: Greek Revival, Shingle Style, shot-gun
- Website: louisvillebutchertown.com
- NRHP reference No.: 76000900 (original); 100004421 (increase)

Significant dates
- Added to NRHP: August 11, 1976
- Boundary increase: September 27, 2019

Butchertown is a neighborhood just east of downtown Louisville, Kentucky, United States, bounded by I-65, Main Street, I-71, Beargrass Creek and Mellwood Avenue.

The Butchertown Historic District is a 50 acres (20 ha) part which was listed on the National Register of Historic Places in 1976. It includes the 1914-built Beaux Arts Stockyard Exchange Building designed by D.X. Murphy and Brother.

== History ==
The first homes in the area were laid out in the 1820s along the newly completed Louisville to Lexington turnpike, referred to in that stretch as Story Avenue. Two of the first landowners in the area, Whig Party loyalist George Buchanan and Isaac Stewart, had the new community's streets named after major Whig Party members, such as John Quincy Adams, Daniel Webster and Henry Clay. In the 1850s Beargrass Creek was rerouted away from what is now downtown Louisville and through the area, making it an ideal area for butchers and stockyards because the animal remains could be dumped in the creek and such businesses were banned in the downtown area for sanitation reasons. The population swelled as waves of German immigrants entered the area. Bourbon Stockyards, built in 1836, was the first stockyard to locate in Butchertown. A bank is in portions of the original building.

Due to the high German population, and resentment of them by supporters of the Know Nothing party, Butchertown was where the "Bloody Monday" riots of August 1855 began as Know Nothings tried to prevent Germans and Irish from voting in an election. The riots killed 22 people.

For the first 100 years of its existence, Butchertown was a thriving residential and industrial area, though other Louisville neighborhoods regarded it as a haven for drunkards and brawlers. However, the area began declining after the great Ohio River flood of 1937 destroyed many of the homes there. Many other homes were demolished for the construction of the Ohio River flood wall, the construction of interstates and the Kennedy Interchange ("Spaghetti Junction") through the area, and the expansion of industrial land into formerly residential areas. Suburbanization continued to bring the residential areas into decline, until the few remaining residents began lobbying for rezoning (the entire area was zoned as industrial), and fixing up vacant and underrepaired houses.

Since the 1990s, the area has attracted many young professionals. In recent years, the east Market Street area of downtown Louisville has seen a great deal of revitalization, including the expansion of Waterfront Park, Louisville Slugger Field, and the conversion of empty store fronts into new condominiums. This has helped spur further improvements in Butchertown itself, as many new antique shops and art galleries have opened off the Market Street corridor.

In the 2000s, there were plans as part of the Ohio River Bridges Project to move the Kennedy Interchange further south when it was to be reconfigured by 2018, meaning that more buildings in Butchertown would be razed. However, these plans were scrapped in favor of reconfiguring the interchange in its existing location. Furthermore, the project included a second interstate bridge just east of the John F. Kennedy Memorial Bridge that opened as the Abraham Lincoln Bridge on December 6, 2015. The necessity of flyover ramps for the new bridge led to the demolishing of about one-third of Butchertown's David Armstrong Extreme Park, along with a rebuild of facilities on an adjacent property.

== Demographics ==
As of 2000, the population of Butchertown was 975, of which Whites were 82.8%, Blacks were 7.2%, Hispanics were 5.3%, and other races were 4.7%. Males of all races were 60.1% of the population, while females were 39.9%.

== Attractions ==
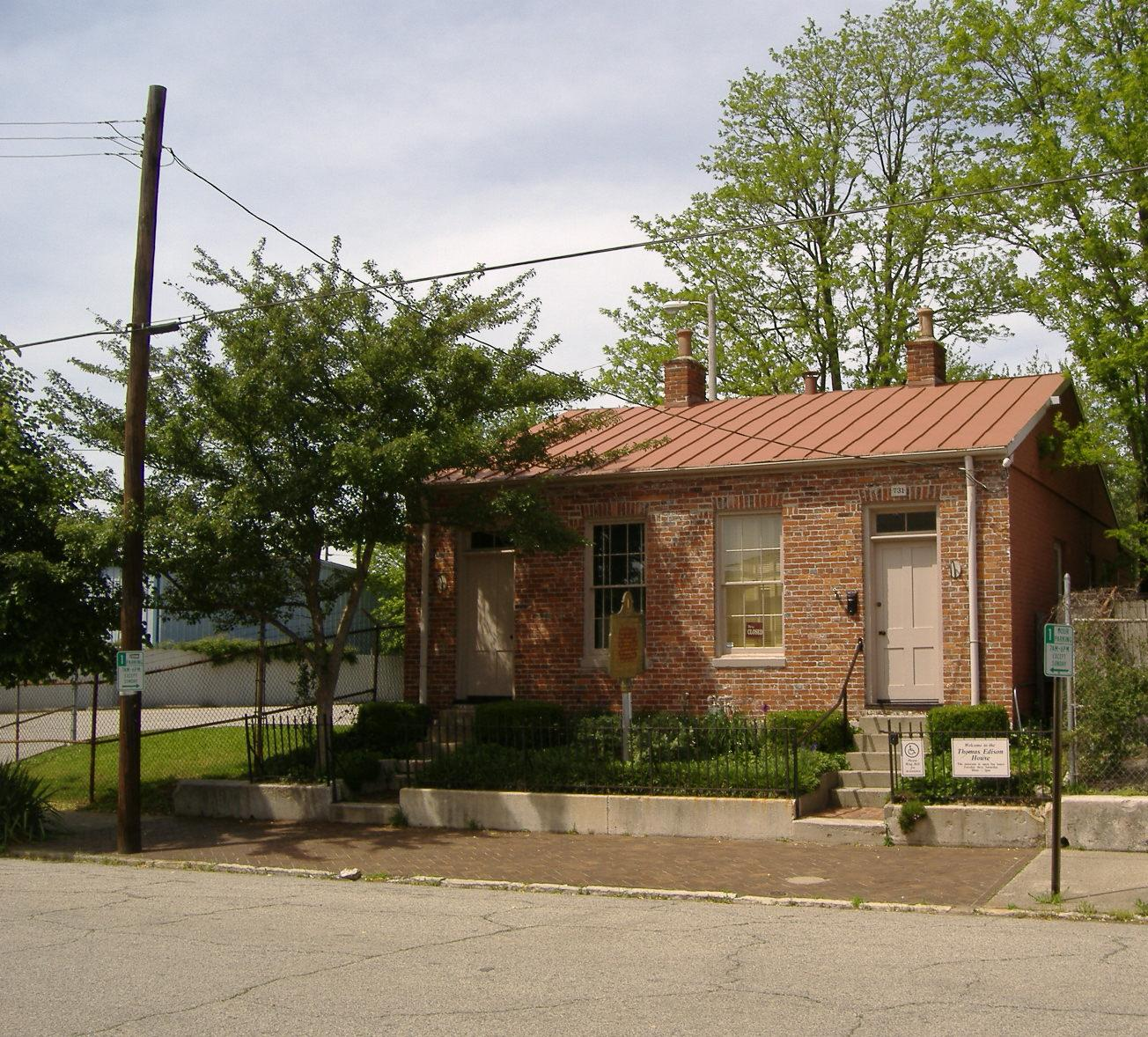
Thomas Edison House

Butchertown contains several attractions, including the David Armstrong Extreme Park and Thomas Edison House, a shotgun house near where Thomas Edison lived in 1866 on Washington Street. It also contains the remaining front façade of the former early 19th century Heigold House, which features a detailed sketch of important early Whig Party leaders, displays the words "dedicated the greatest man in history, George Washington" etched across its front; the rest of the Fulton Street house has been razed. Lynn Family Stadium, a soccer stadium opened in 2020 home to Louisville City FC and Racing Louisville FC, is located in Butchertown.

Butchertown is also known for its emergence of more modern shops, restaurants, and destination spots.

== See also ==
- Germantown, Louisville
- History of Germans in Louisville
- National Register of Historic Places listings in Jefferson County, Kentucky
