= George Rogers Clark Memorial Bridge =

Crossing of the Ohio River between Louisville, Kentucky, and Jeffersonville, Indiana

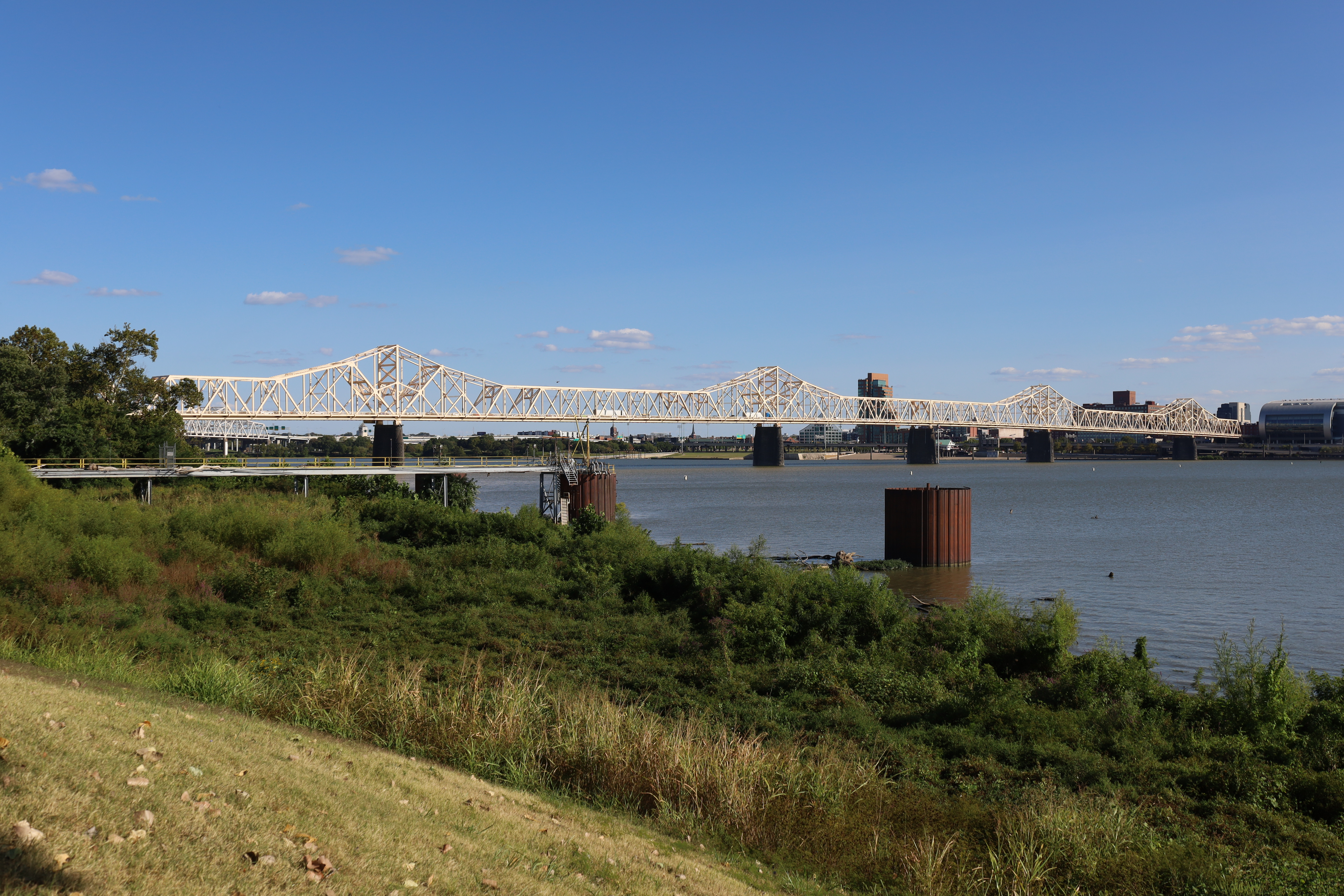
- The bridge in 2025
- Coordinates: 38°15′49″N 85°45′05″W
- Carries: 4 lanes of US 31
- Crosses: Ohio River
- Locale: Louisville, Kentucky, and Jeffersonville, Indiana
- Other name: Second Street Bridge
- Named for: George Rogers Clark
- Maintained by: Kentucky Transportation Cabinet
- Preceded by: John F. Kennedy Memorial Bridge
- Followed by: Fourteenth Street (L&I) Bridge

Characteristics
- Design: Cantilever bridge
- Material: Steel
- Pier construction: granite backed by concrete
- Total length: 5,746.5 ft (1,751.5 m)
- Width: 38.0 ft (11.6 m)
- No. of spans: 7
- Piers in water: 6
- Clearance below: 72.6 ft (22.1 m) at middle of channel span when river is at pool stage, or "normal" level

History
- Designer: Ralph Modjeski and Frank M. Masters
- Constructed by: Vang Construction Company (piers) and American Bridge Company (superstructure)
- Construction start: June 30, 1928 (first caisson launched)
- Construction cost: $4.8 million
- Opened: October 31, 1929

U.S. National Register of Historic Places
- Official name: Louisville Municipal Bridge, Pylons and Administration Building
- Designated: March 8, 1984
- Reference no.: 84001578

Location
- Interactive map of George Rogers Clark Memorial Bridge

The George Rogers Clark Memorial Bridge, known locally as the Second Street Bridge, is a four-lane cantilevered truss bridge crossing the Ohio River between Louisville, Kentucky, and Jeffersonville, Indiana, that carries US 31.

== History ==
=== Planning and construction ===
Debate to build a highway bridge connecting Louisville to Jeffersonville began in 1919. Both cities and the public were in favor of building the bridge, but how to fund the project was unclear. In 1926 a ballot measure was voted down by residents which would have allowed the government to fund the bridge construction. A similar measure to fund the bridge construction with municipal insured bonds was voted down shortly after. Officials finally agreed to authorize a private company to construct the bridge using private funds, and they were granted authority to toll the bridge to recoup their investment.

The bridge was designed by Ralph Modjeski and Frank Masters with architectural details handled by Paul Philippe Cret of Philadelphia. Construction of the approaches and administration buildings began in 1926, and construction of the bridge itself began in June 1928 by the American Bridge Company of Pittsburgh at a cost of $4.7 million. The bridge was constructed using a newly invented method. Rather than build out from the shore, the bridge was constructed from the center towards land. The new method proved successful, and was subsequently used in the construction of many other bridges including the Oakland Bay Bridge in San Francisco a few years later. Newspapers reported two deaths during the construction of the bridge. The first worker died in 1929 after being struck by an iron crank, and a second worker died falling from the bridge and landing on a barge.

=== Early history ===
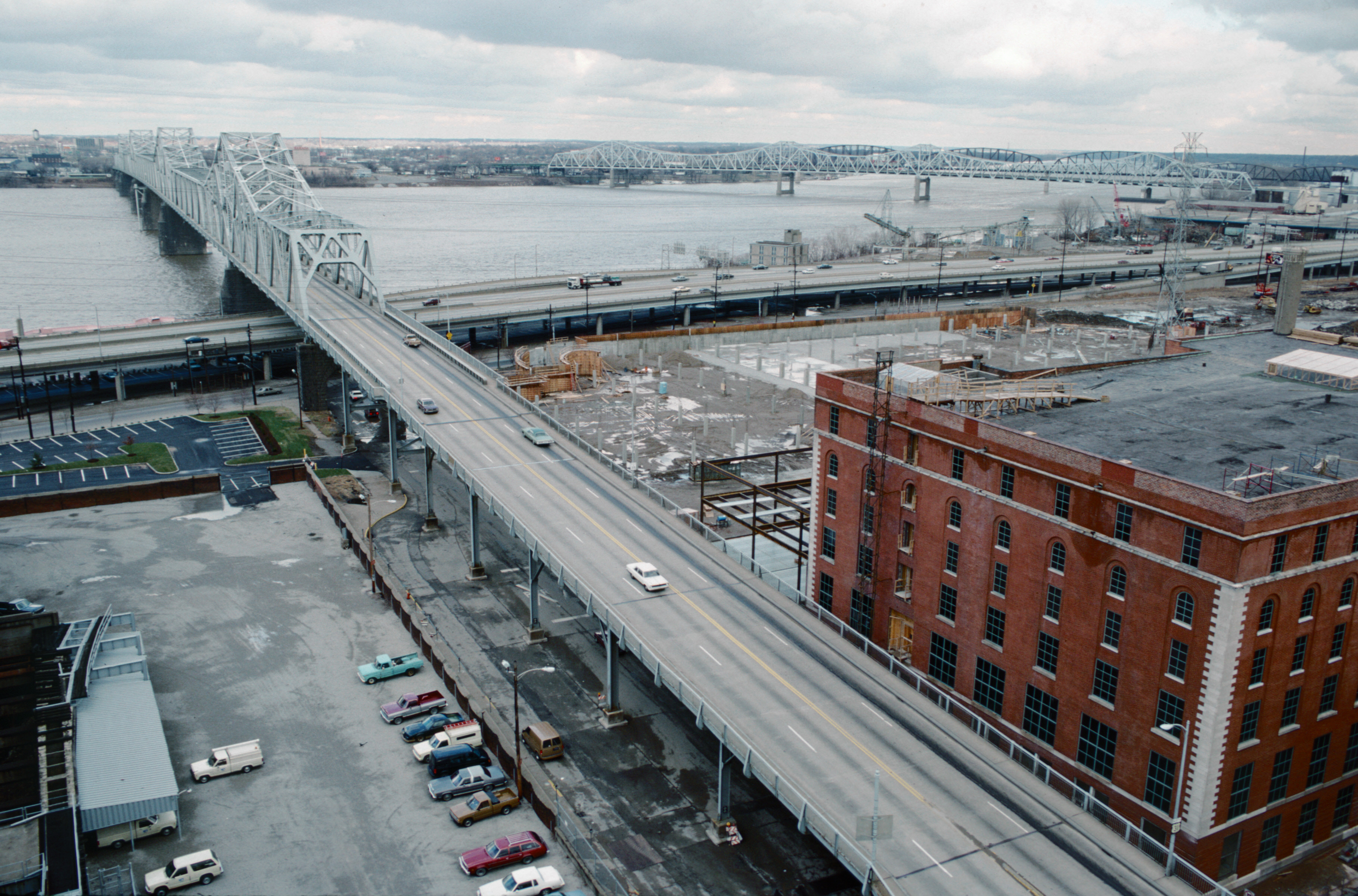
Approach to the bridge in 1987

President Herbert Hoover dedicated the bridge at its opening. It was opened to the public on October 31, 1929, as the Louisville Municipal Bridge and operated as a toll bridge. The toll was 35 cents until December 31, 1936, when it was lowered to 25 cents. The last of the bonds that financed the construction were redeemed in 1946, and the tolls were removed.

On January 17, 1949, the bridge was renamed in honor of George Rogers Clark, recognized as the founder of Louisville and neighboring Clark County, Indiana. The bridge was rehabilitated in 1958. There was a movement in the 1950s to restore tolls, as traffic on the bridge had reached capacity and funding was needed for an additional bridge, but a toll was opposed strongly by most residents. Ultimately most of the funds for two additional bridges (for motor vehicles only) that carry interstate highways came from the federal government.

The bridge was placed on the National Register of Historic Places on March 8, 1984, as the Louisville Municipal Bridge, Pylons and Administration Building.

=== 21st century ===
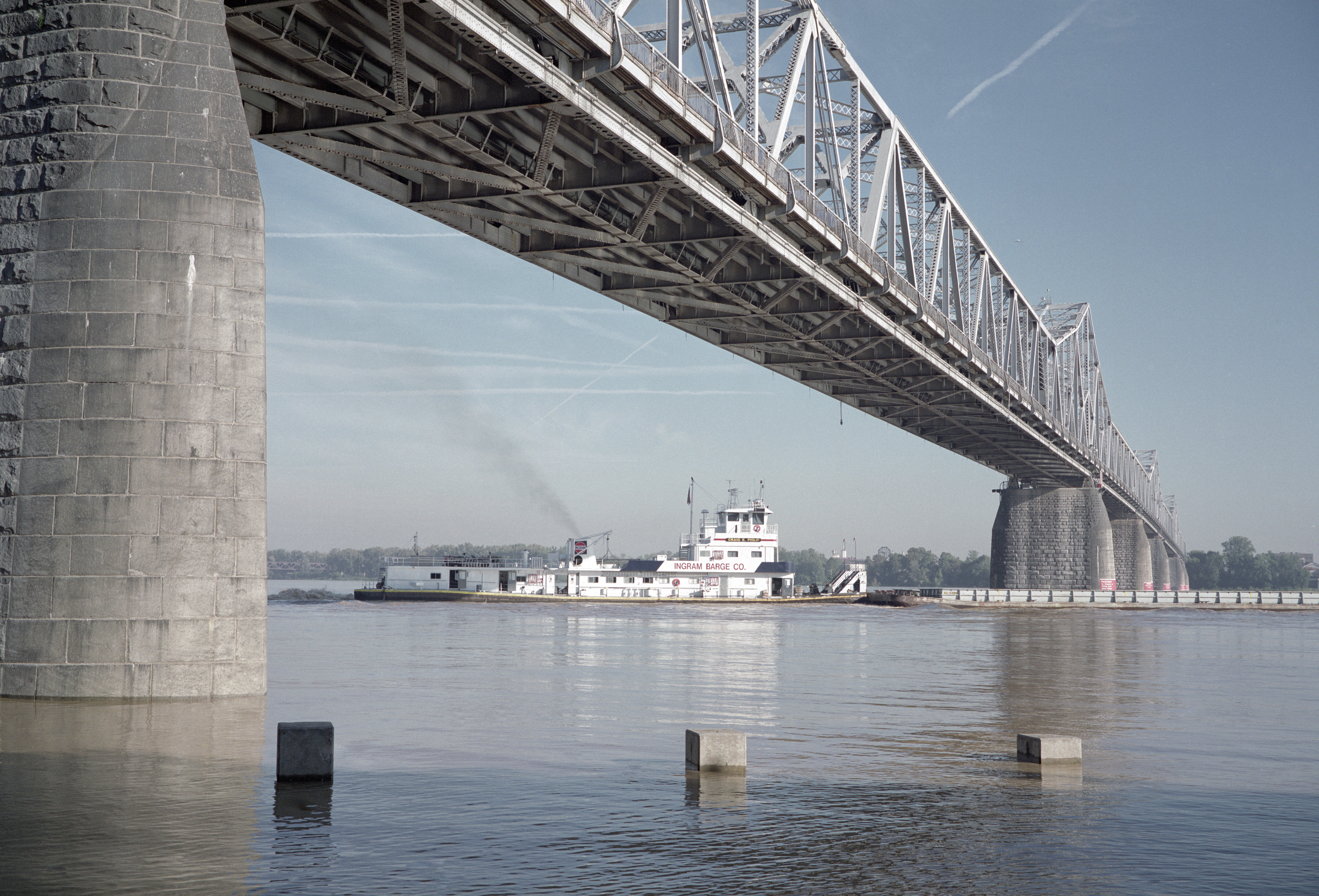
Towboat "Craig E. Philip" upbound at George Rogers Clark Memorial Bridge in 2004

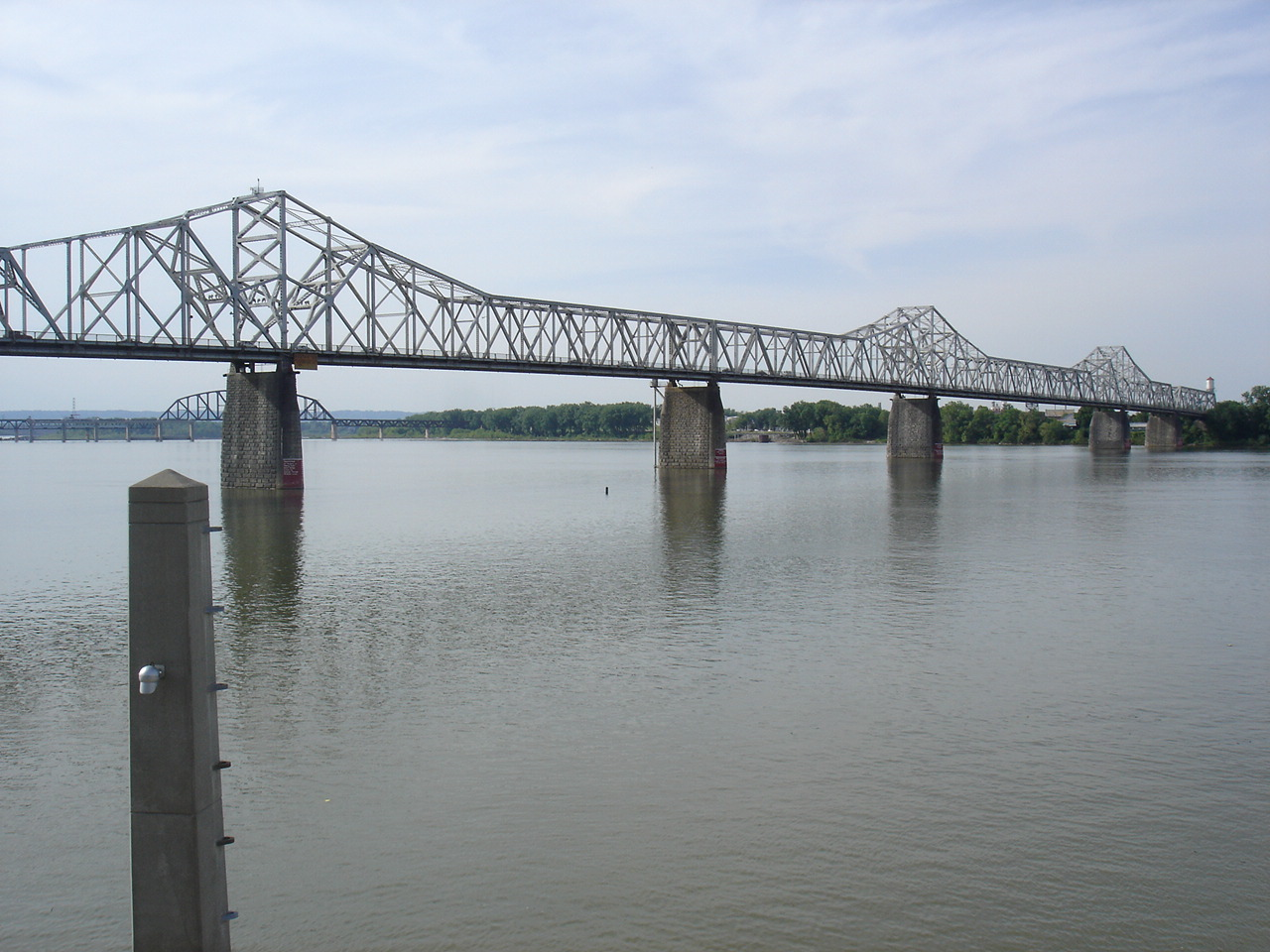
The bridge as seen from Louisville Waterfront Park in 2006

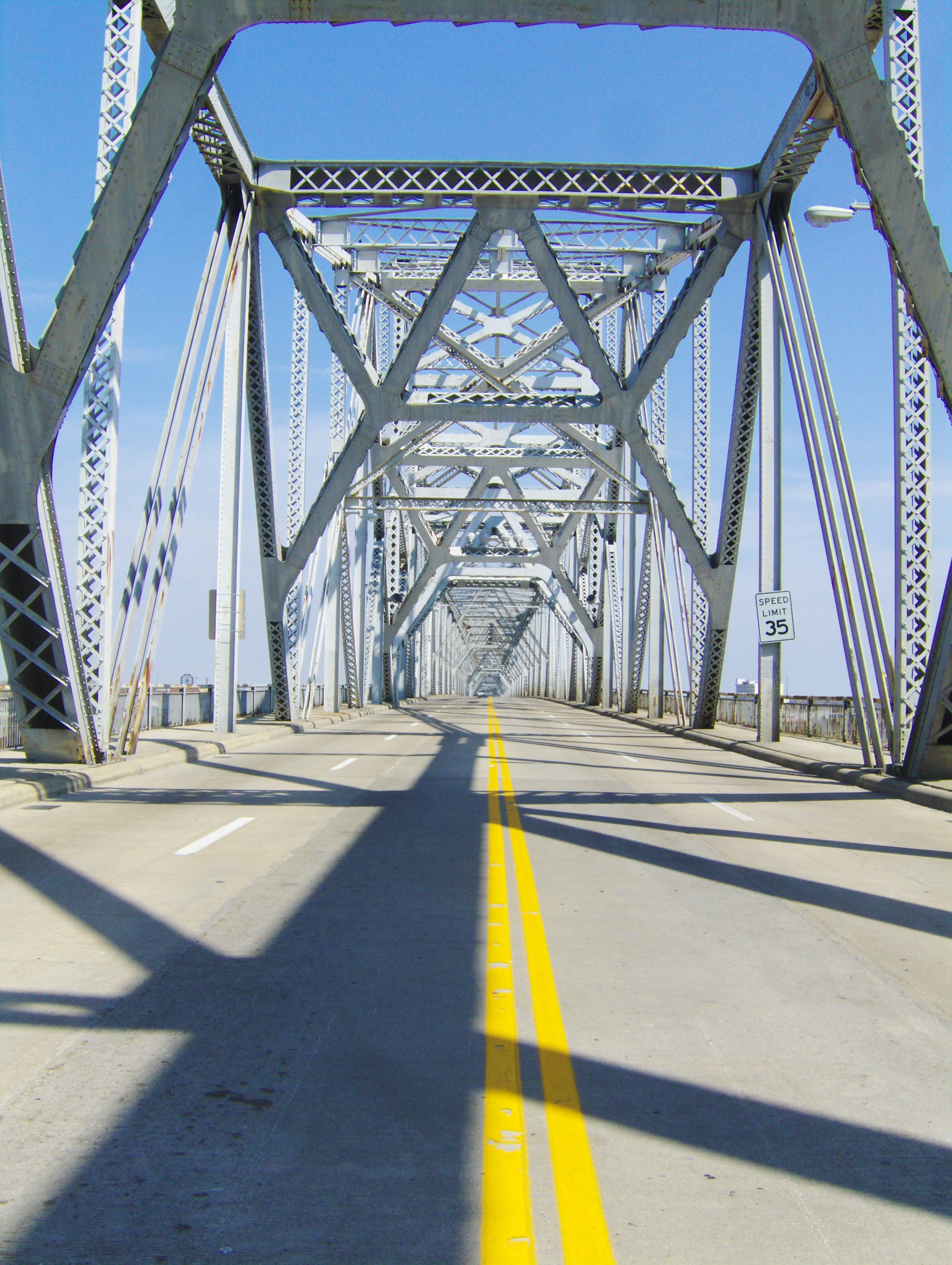
The bridge deck in 2009

In June 2010, Kentucky Governor Steve Beshear and Louisville Mayor Jerry Abramson announced a new $3 million streetscape improvement project directly underneath the Clark Memorial Bridge, a three-block area from Main Street to River Road, which transformed the area into a plaza. It included a new decorative lighting system under the refurbished Clark Memorial Bridge, wide sidewalks, seats, new pedestrian and festival areas, and extensive plantings, making it an inviting promenade for the recently constructed and neighboring KFC Yum! Center. The project was completed in time for the October 2010 opening of the arena. CARMAN provided the landscape architecture and civil engineering services for the 2010 streetscape project.

The bridge was expected to see significant increases in traffic following the completion of the Ohio River Bridges Project near the end of 2016. The project included repurposing the John F. Kennedy Memorial Bridge, which previously carried I-65 in both directions, for southbound traffic only; building the new Abraham Lincoln Bridge for northbound I-65 traffic; and building the Lewis and Clark Bridge to connect I-265 in the two states. The two I-65 crossings and the I-265 bridge are now tolled to pay for the project. One consultant who worked on a transportation study for the Kentucky government predicted that traffic on the bridge would increase by 25% once tolling on the other bridges started, and the mayor of Jeffersonville expressed concern about the possible effects of increased traffic on the bridge's structural integrity. These concerns were heightened by the discovery of a cracked girder and other structural issues (since repaired) during a routine 2014 inspection.

On March 1, 2024, a Sysco semi-truck headed towards Indiana was hit by an oncoming pickup truck, causing the semi driver to immediately lose control just north of the middle pier. The semi hurtled through the west railing of the bridge, leaving the cab hanging perilously over the Ohio River. The semi driver, who suffered minor injuries in the actual collision, was rescued 45 minutes after the crash, which also involved three other vehicles and sent one driver to the hospital with life-threatening injuries. Due to the incident, the bridge was partially closed for repairs for more than a month.

== Culture ==
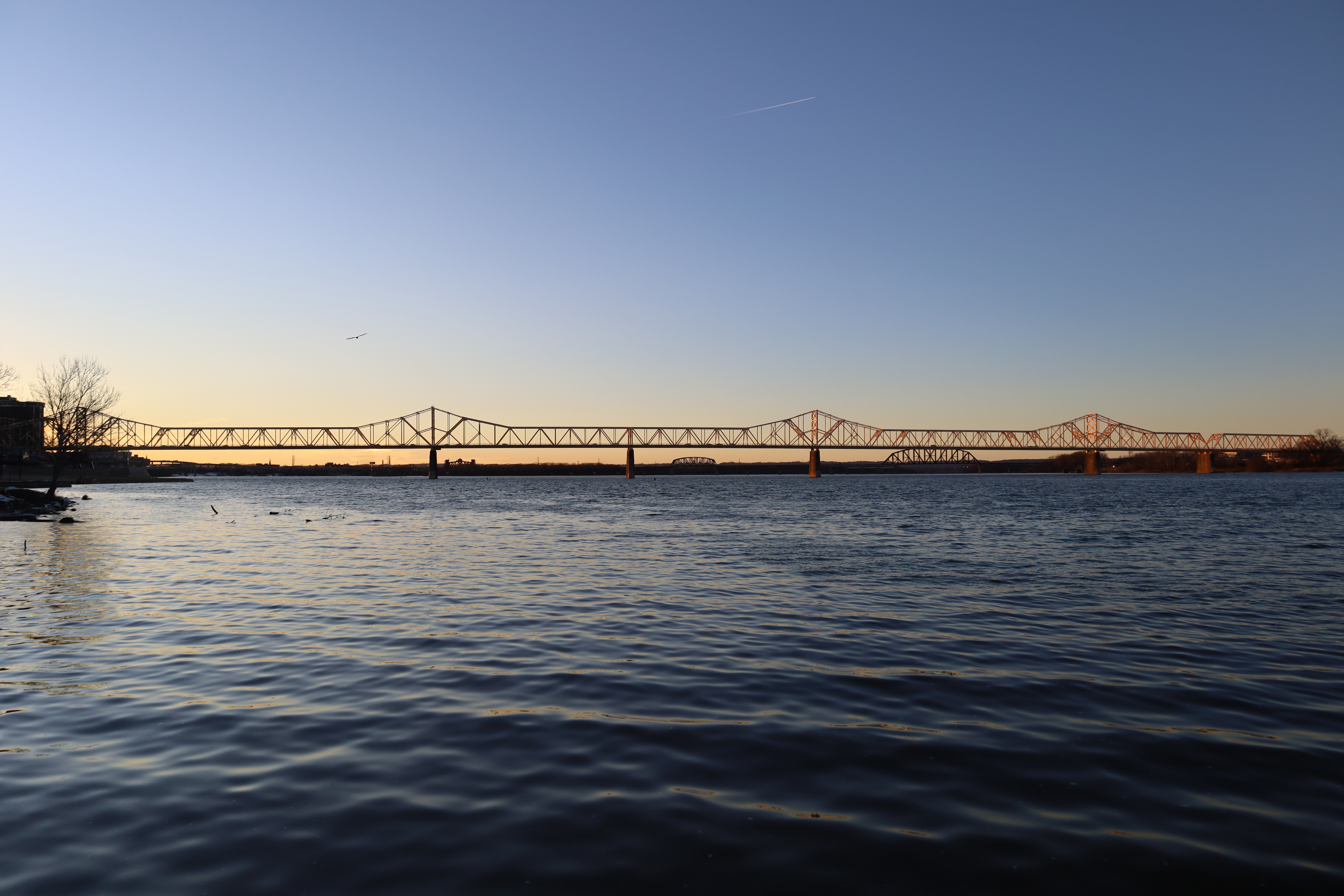
The bridge in twilight in 2025

Locally, the Clark Bridge is known as the Second Street Bridge due to its direct alignment onto Second Street in Louisville. There is a pedestrian sidewalk on each side of the bridge deck. The Clark Bridge was previously the only regional Ohio River bridge open to non-motorized traffic, until the opening of the Indiana side of the nearby Big Four Bridge to pedestrian and bicycle traffic in May 2014.

Since 1991, the bridge has been used as "ground zero" for the annual Thunder Over Louisville event, when a waterfall of fireworks flows along the entire length of the bridge during the fireworks show. This involves traffic being closed for much of the week. This is criticized as it cuts off both the only non-interstate and, prior to the Big Four Bridge reopening, the only pedestrian route between Louisville and southern Indiana, which can impact local businesses such as bicycle couriers.

The bridge is featured in a scene from the 1981 movie Stripes in which Bill Murray drives his cab to the middle of the span, gets out of the vehicle and then tosses his keys into the river below.

== See also ==
- List of crossings of the Ohio River
