= Transylvania Beach, Louisville =

Neighborhood in Louisville, Kentucky

Coordinates: 38°20′27″N 85°38′21″W

Transylvania Beach is a neighborhood of Louisville, Kentucky located on the Ohio River and centered along Transylvania Beach Road. The Lewis and Clark Bridge (Ohio River) (Interstate 265) enters the neighborhood where it connects to the Kentucky side of the river, then cuts through the neighborhood when it becomes the Gene Snyder Freeway.
