= Kennedy Interchange =

Highway interchange in Kentucky

- Spaghetti Junction
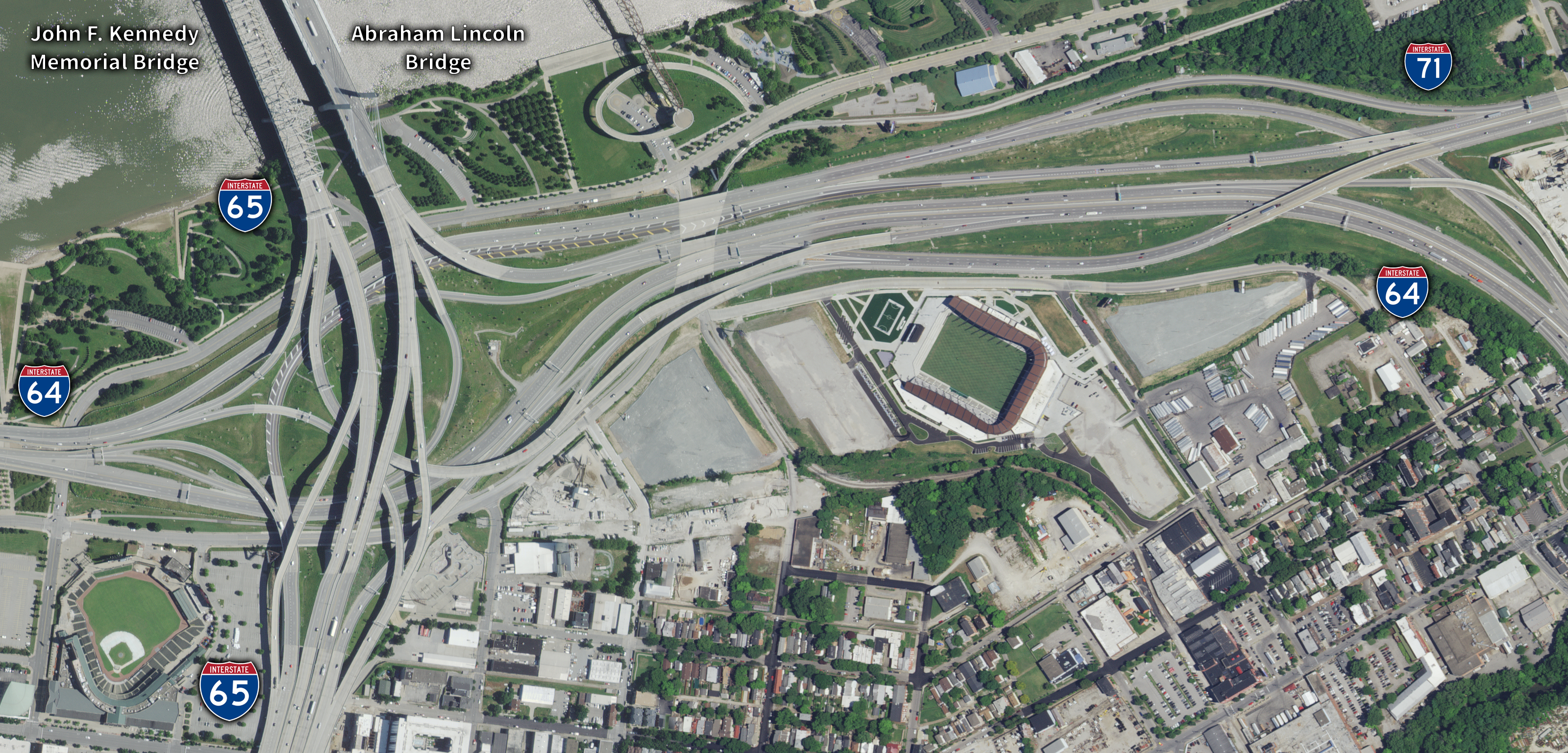
- Aerial view of the Kennedy Interchange
- Interactive map of Kennedy Interchange

Location
- Louisville, Kentucky
- Coordinates: 38.261216°N 85.734322°W
- Roads at junction: I-64; I-65; I-71

Construction
- Opened: 1964; 62 years ago
- Maintained by: Kentucky Transportation Cabinet

The Kennedy Interchange, unofficially, though universally, referred to as Spaghetti Junction, is the intersection of Interstate 64 (I-64), I-65 and I-71 at the northeastern edge of downtown Louisville, Kentucky, United States. It is named for the John F. Kennedy Memorial Bridge, which carries I-65, located immediately to the north of the interchange.

== History ==
The Kennedy Interchange was designed by Barstow, Mulligan and Vollmer, a New York firm. Construction began in the spring of 1962 and when it was complete, the design was adequate to handle the traffic needs of the time. Henry Ward, a member of the Louisville Chamber of Commerce in 1958, lobbied in Frankfort to Highway Commissioner Ward Oates to have I-65 (and other Interstates) routed through downtown Louisville. At that time Ward, who would later become the state Highway Commissioner from 1960 to 1967, stated that "downtown Louisville felt it would be disastrous for it to be bypassed by the interstate". There was tremendous pressure from both sides to push the Interstate Highway System through downtown. Later on in 1996, he reflected back and stated that "... it was a mistake. I think downtown Louisville would have been better off if Interstate 65 had not been located where it is".

In 1996, the Ohio River Major Investment Study suggested rebuilding the Kennedy Interchange at an estimated cost of $120.5 million. It stated that during rush hour, traffic congested at the interchange causing pollution and creating potential accidents since it has a high crash rate. From 1996 to 1998, there were 261 crashes for every 100 million miles traveled within the Kennedy Interchange, 172% higher than the state average. The need for an upgrade conflicted with demands for a new "East End Bridge" upstream from the city to connect the Kentucky and Indiana sections of I-265, an idea fought by well-funded preservationists in the area. The study ended decades of debate by recommending that both bridges be constructed. In 1997, U.S. Representatives Anne Northup and Lee H. Hamilton, House members from the districts involved, secured $40 million for an environmental impact study (EIS) that was completed in 2002. This allowed design of the new junction and bridges to commence.

== Redesign and reconstruction ==
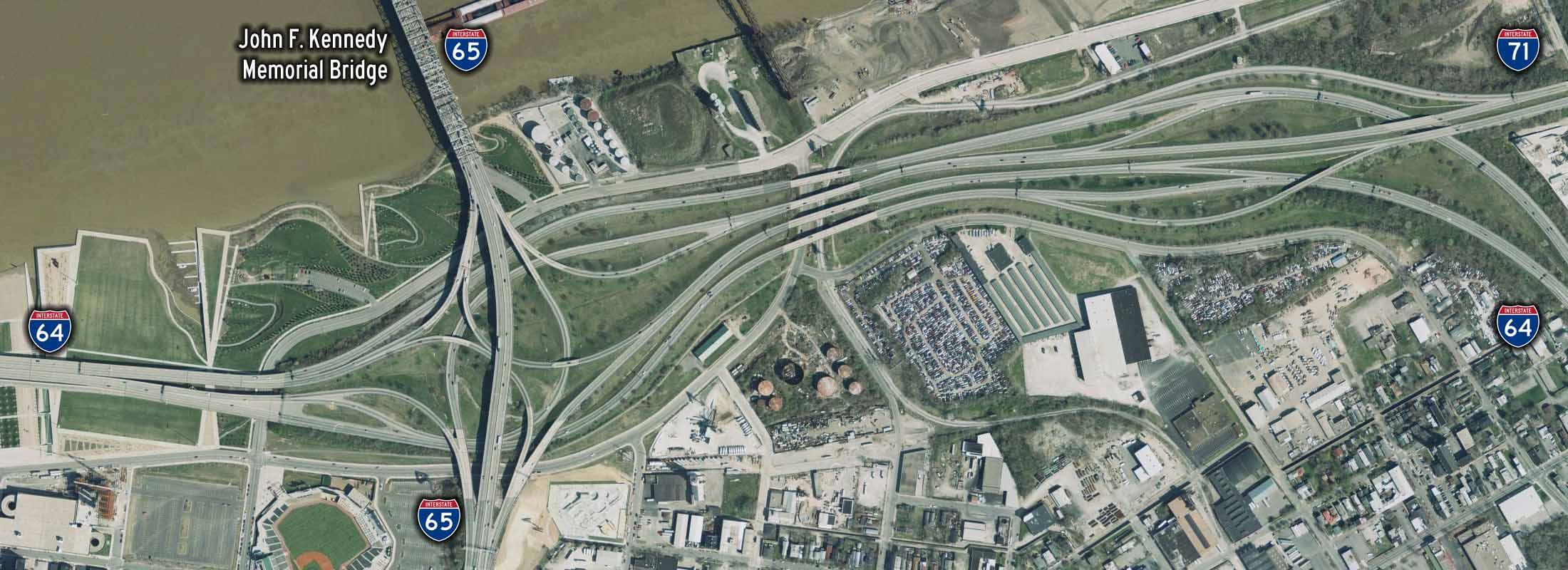
The Kennedy Interchange prior to redesign

On October 27, 2005, the original plans for a redesign for the Kennedy Interchange were revealed by the QK4 engineering firm. The $1.1 billion project entailed rebuilding the I-64, I-65 and I-71 interchange. This was part of the $2.46 billion Ohio River Bridges Project that built a parallel I-65 span and a new I-265 crossing. The new downtown span and the redesigned interchange were a major change from the pre-existing setup.

The following changes were made to Spaghetti Junction as part of this project:

- I-64 now features two lanes in each direction rather than being funneled into one lane.
- Shoulders were widened to 12 feet (3.7 m).
- New I-65 overpasses in the downtown area at Brook, Floyd and Chestnut streets to make the spaces beneath brighter and more attractive to pedestrians and bikers. New landscaping was also placed.
- Incorporating the new Northbound I-65 bridge into the freeway and street matrix.
- Incorporating the re-built John F. Kennedy Bridge as a southbound-only six-lane bridge for I-65.

On December 7, 2015, the new Abraham Lincoln Bridge opened to northbound traffic. In 2016, southbound traffic was moved to the new bridge, so the Kennedy bridge could be repaired. On December 18, 2016, the East End bridge opened as the Lewis and Clark Bridge, named for the explorers who first met at Clarksville, Indiana, across the river from Louisville. Now all three bridges are in full use.

== Origin of nickname ==
The name "Spaghetti Junction" may have originated more than once in different places, with independent coiners who were unaware of each other's use of the word. It refers to the resemblance of a complex, asymmetrical, and irregularly-shaped network of ramps to strands of cooked spaghetti.

== See also ==
- Transportation in Louisville, Kentucky
- Louisville Waterfront Park – on land just north of the east–west lanes of the interchange
