= Lewis and Clark Bridge (Ohio River) =

Crossing of the Ohio River northeast of downtown Louisville, KY

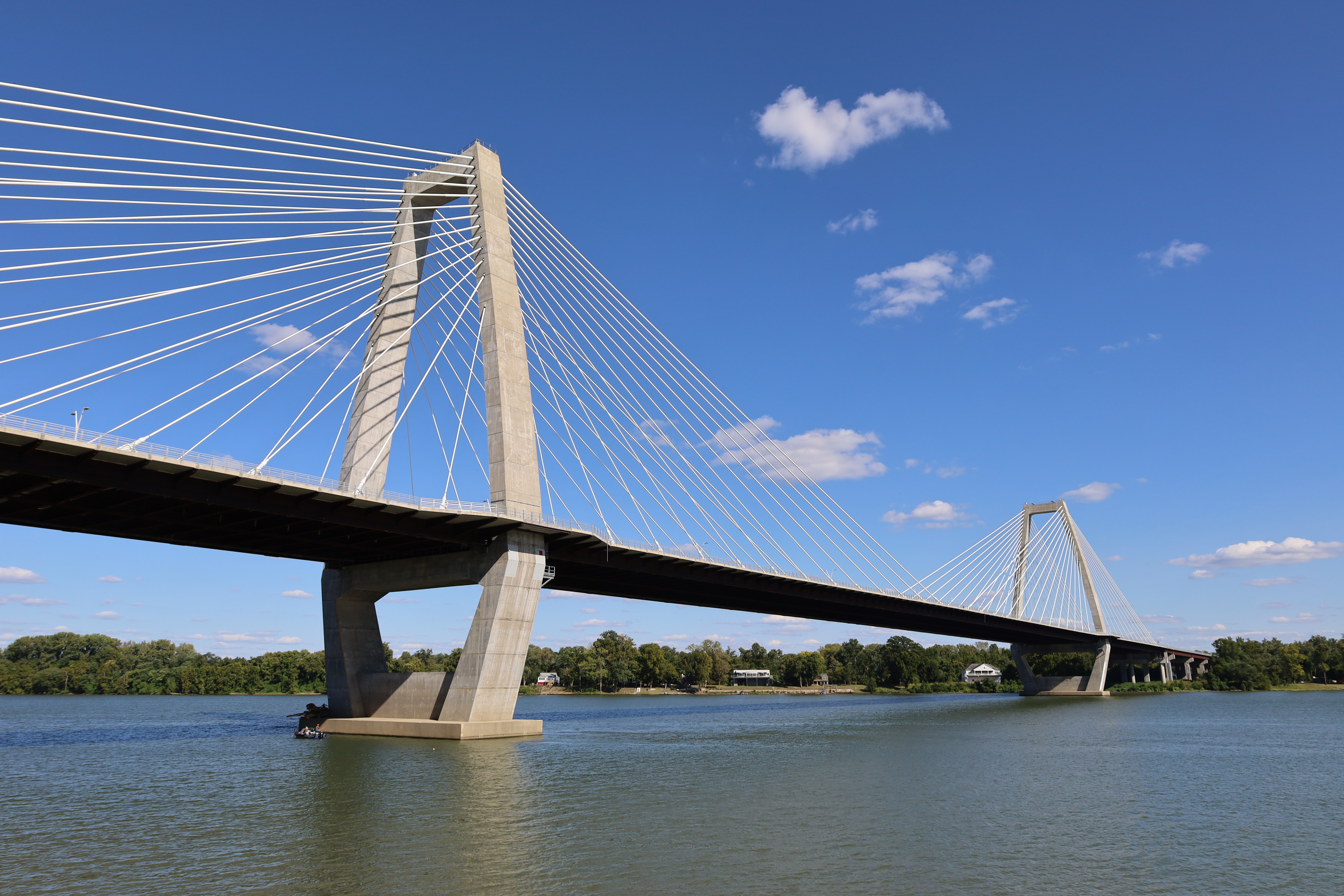
- The bridge in 2025
- Coordinates: 38.3427°N 85.6433°W
- Carries: 4 lanes of I-265 (full length) / KY 841 (KY side)
- Crosses: Ohio River
- Locale: Prospect, Kentucky (Transylvania Beach) and Utica, Indiana – near Louisville, Kentucky
- Maintained by: WVB East End Partners
- ID number: BH 57876

Characteristics
- Design: Cable-stayed bridge
- Total length: 2,500 ft (762 m)
- Longest span: 1,200 ft (366 m)

History
- Opened: December 18, 2016

Statistics
- Toll: Passenger Vehicle: $2.79 (E-ZPass/RiverLink); $4.18 (Pay-By-Plate account); $5.57 (no account); Medium Vehicle: $6.95 (E-ZPass/RiverLink); $8.32 (Pay-By-Plate account); $9.70 (no account); Large Vehicle: $13.84 (E-ZPass/RiverLink); $15.51 (Pay-By-Plate account); $16.62 (no account)

Location
- Interactive map of Lewis and Clark Bridge

The Lewis and Clark Bridge is a cable-stayed bridge that crosses the Ohio River northeast of downtown Louisville, Kentucky and is part of a ring road around the Louisville metropolitan area, connecting two previously disjointed segments of Interstate 265. It was known as the East End Bridge for 30 years since its conception and while under construction, and renamed by Indiana officials on the day of its opening, December 18, 2016. The bridge provides for walking and bicycling. For motor vehicles, tolling began on December 30, 2016.

The two "Clark" bridges in Louisville are named after different people: this bridge's name refers to William Clark of the Lewis and Clark Expedition, while the Clark Memorial Bridge in Downtown Louisville is named for his older brother, George Rogers Clark.

== History ==
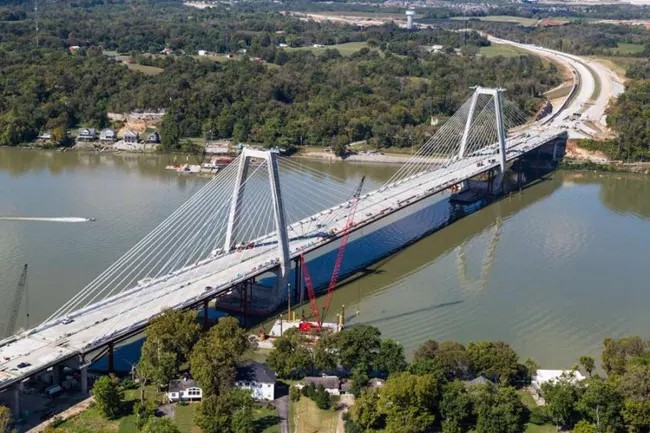
Aerial view of the bridge in a late stage of construction in 2016

The design for what was then known as the East End Bridge is the result of the $22.1 million, four-year Ohio River Bridges Study, which found that solving the region's traffic congestion would require the construction of two new bridges across the Ohio River and reconstruction of the Kennedy Interchange in downtown Louisville.

Limited land acquisition began in 2004. Construction costs totaled $242 million at the end of January 2017.

On June 4, 2019, the two disjointed sections of I-265 were finally connected under AASHTO approval, with the Indiana State Road 265 designation decommissioned and replaced by I-265. However, the Kentucky Route 841 designation mostly concurrent with I-265 in Kentucky has remained.

Exit renumbering is ongoing along I-265 in both states. By fall 2026, the entire highway from I-65 in Kentucky to I-64 in Indiana will be signed as I-265. Unusually for Interstate highways, the new numbering scheme will not reset at the state border.

== See also ==
- List of crossings of the Ohio River
