= Abraham Lincoln Bridge =

Ohio River bridge for Interstate 65

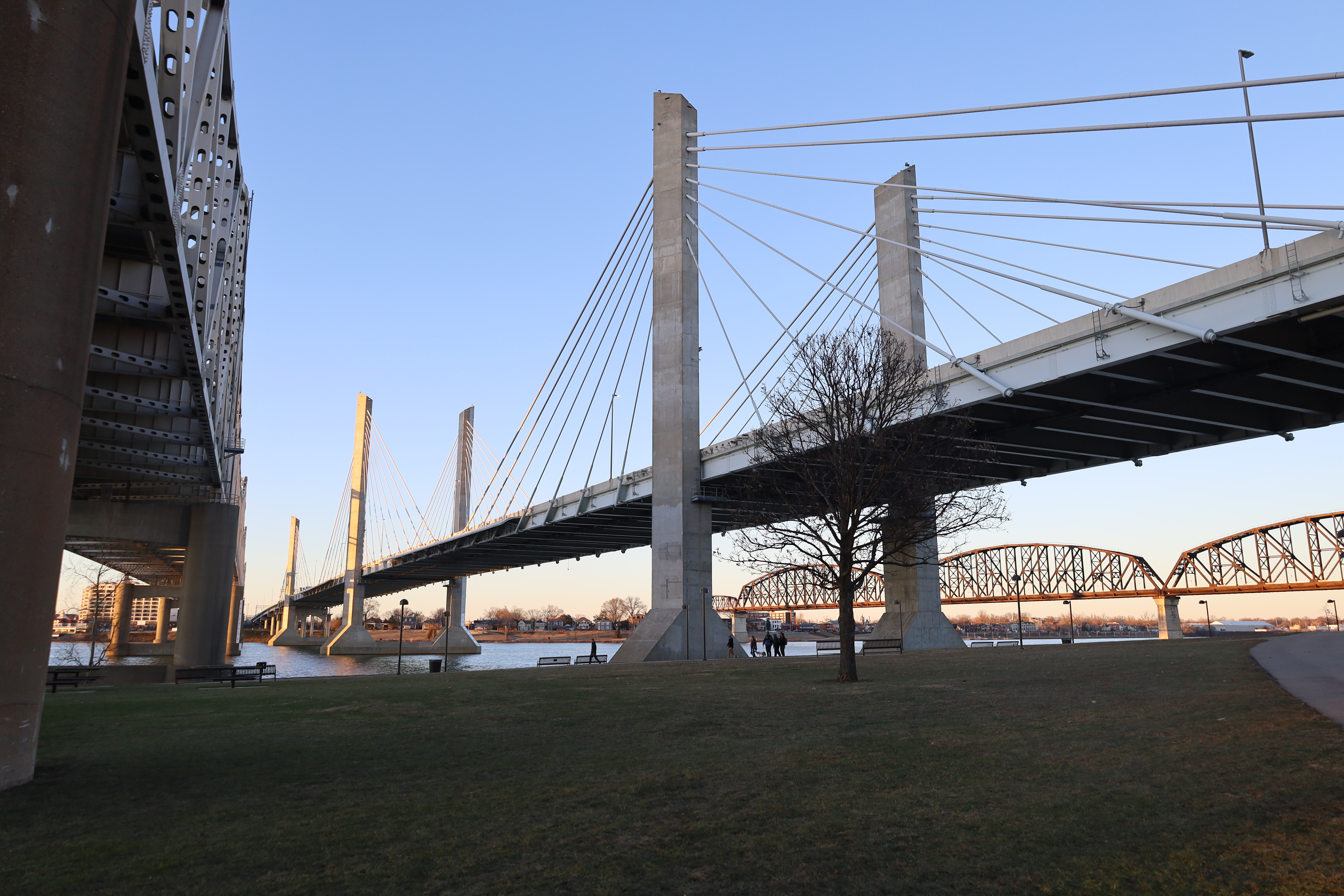
- The bridge in 2025
- Coordinates: 38°15′52″N 85°44′37″W
- Carries: 6 lanes of northbound I-65
- Crosses: Ohio River
- Locale: Louisville, Kentucky and Jeffersonville, Indiana
- Maintained by: Kentucky Transportation Cabinet

Characteristics
- Design: Cable-stayed bridge
- Total length: 2,100 ft (640 m)
- Longest span: 700 ft (213 m) × 2 spans

History
- Opened: December 6, 2015

Statistics
- Toll: Passenger Vehicle: $2.79 (E-ZPass/RiverLink); $4.18 (Pay-By-Plate account); $5.57 (no account); Medium Vehicle: $6.95 (E-ZPass/RiverLink); $8.32 (Pay-By-Plate account); $9.70 (no account); Large Vehicle: $13.84 (E-ZPass/RiverLink); $15.51 (Pay-By-Plate account); $16.62 (no account)

Location
- Location in Kentucky

The Abraham Lincoln Bridge is a six-lane, single-deck cable-stayed bridge carrying northbound Interstate 65 across the Ohio River, connecting Louisville, Kentucky, and Jeffersonville, Indiana. It and the adjacent John F. Kennedy Memorial Bridge form a set of twin bridges both carrying Interstate 65 traffic.

The main span is 700 feet (213 m) (two spans) and the bridge has a total length of 2,100 feet (640 m). It is named after U.S. President Abraham Lincoln, who was born in Kentucky and grew up in Southern Indiana.

== History ==
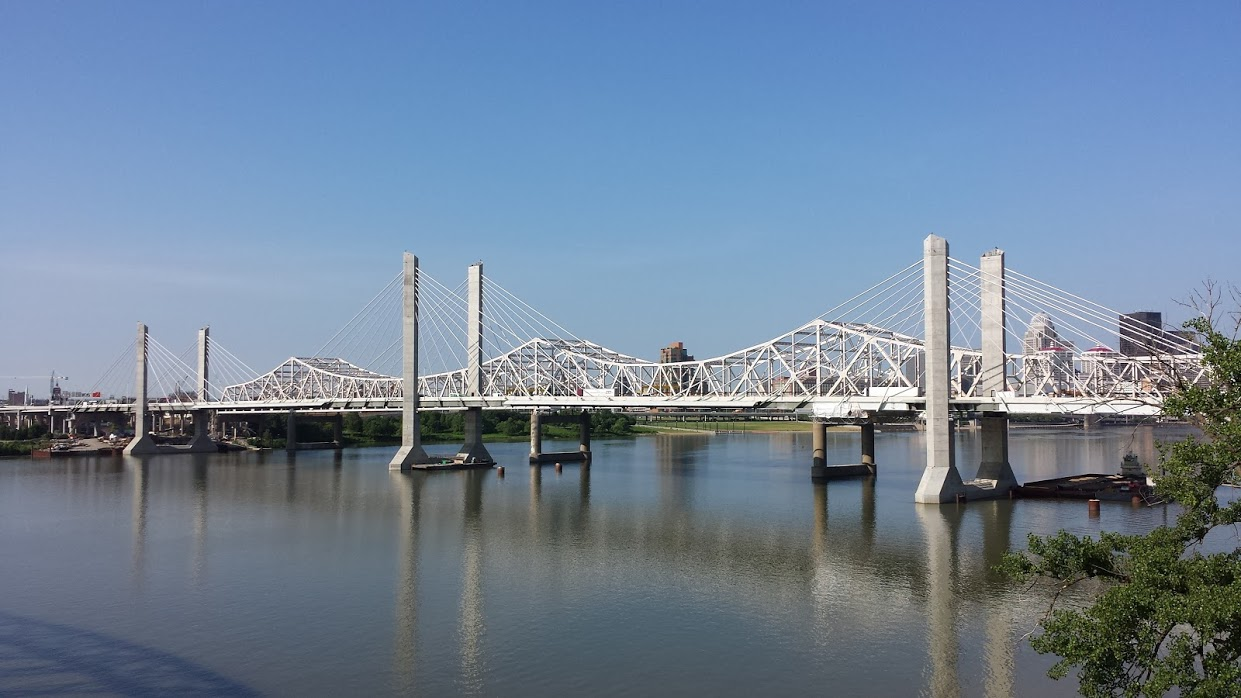
The Abraham Lincoln Bridge viewed from the Big Four Bridge in 2016, with the parallel John F. Kennedy Memorial Bridge in the background

The Abraham Lincoln Bridge opened on December 6, 2015, and is parallel to the John F. Kennedy Memorial Bridge upstream and carries six lanes of northbound I-65 traffic. Pedestrian and bicycle lanes were in the original plans, but were later removed. The existing I-65 John F. Kennedy Memorial Bridge, completed in 1963, was renovated for six lanes of southbound traffic. On October 10, 2016, five lanes of the Kennedy Bridge reopened, at which time the Lincoln Bridge began carrying only northbound traffic after several months of carrying three lanes of traffic in both directions. Both spans opened, with six lanes of traffic in each direction, in December 2016. Tolling on both spans began on December 30, 2016.

A Structured Public Involvement protocol developed by Drs. K. Bailey and T. Grossardt was used to elicit public preferences for the design of the structure. From spring 2005 to summer 2006 several hundred citizens attended a series of public meetings in Louisville, Kentucky and Jeffersonville, Indiana and evaluated a range of bridge design options using 3D visualizations. This public involvement process focused in on designs that the public felt were more suitable, as shown by their polling scores. The SPI public involvement process itself was evaluated by anonymous, real-time citizen polling at the open public meetings.

On July 19, 2006, the final design alternatives for the bridge were announced. The three designs included a three-span arch, a cable-stayed design with three towers, and a cable-stayed type with a single A-shaped support tower. It was also announced that the projected cost for the bridge would be $203 million.

The structure is an additional bridge in downtown Louisville joining the John F. Kennedy Memorial Bridge erected between spring 1961 and late 1963 at a cost of $10 million ($77.5 million in 2015 dollars); the four-lane George Rogers Clark Memorial Bridge, constructed from June 1928 to October 31, 1929, and the Big Four Bridge, which operated as a railroad bridge from 1895 to 1969 and reopened as a pedestrian bridge in 2013.

Some critics say that the Abraham Lincoln Bridge is not being used enough to warrant its cost of construction. The bridge, originally built to ease congestion, is proving to be unused by commuters who do not want to pay the toll. Among the original planners for bridge funding were some who resisted using tolls and the electronic transponder technique of payment without actual toll booths.

== See also ==
- List of crossings of the Ohio River
- Butchertown, Louisville
- Kennedy Interchange ("Spaghetti Junction")
- Ohio River Bridges Project, the highway project of which this bridge is a part
