= John F. Kennedy Memorial Bridge =

Ohio River bridge for Interstate 65

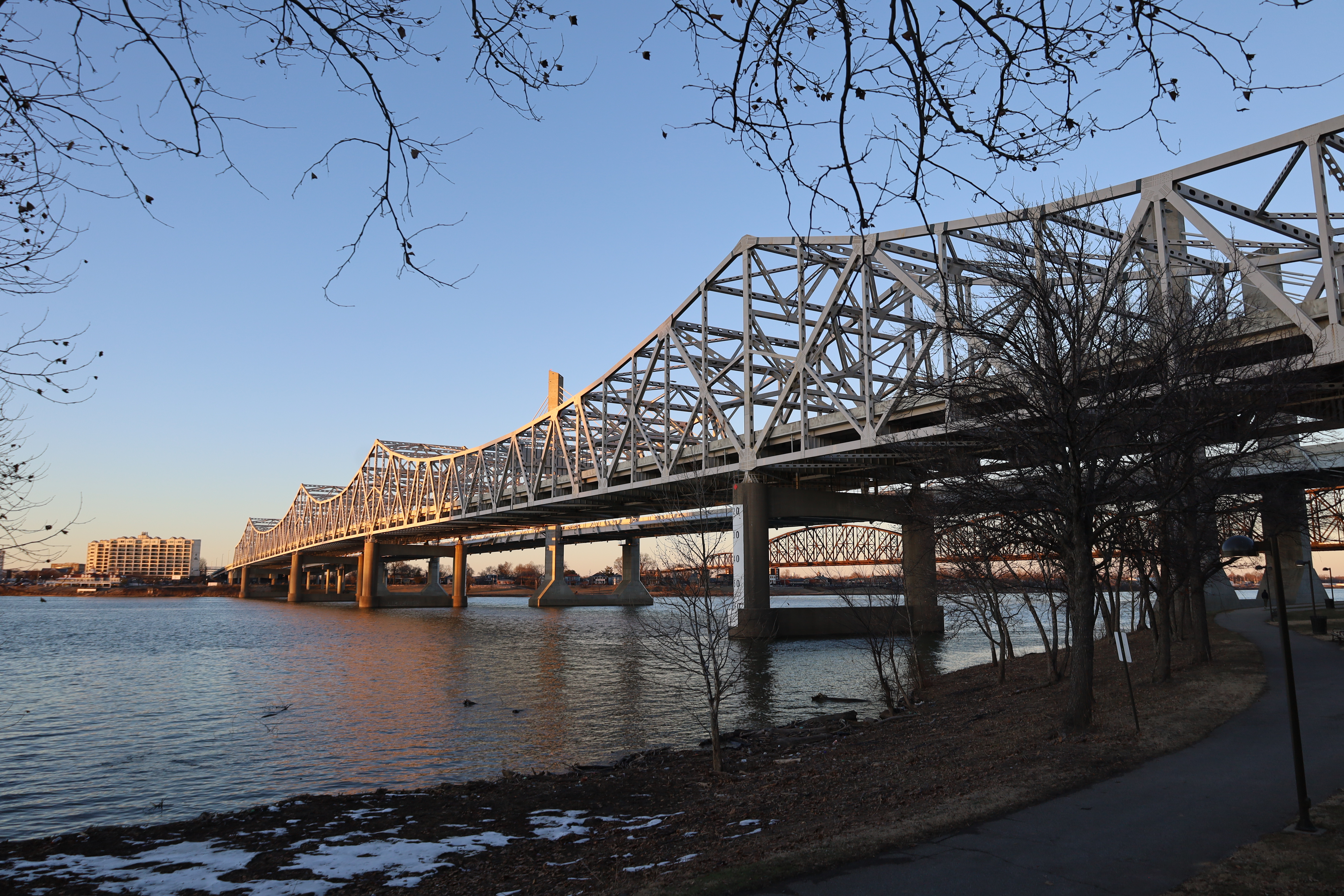
- The bridge in 2025
- Coordinates: 38°15′52″N 85°44′37″W
- Carries: 6 lanes of southbound I-65
- Crosses: Ohio River
- Locale: Louisville, Kentucky and Jeffersonville, Indiana
- Maintained by: Kentucky Transportation Cabinet

Characteristics
- Design: Cantilever bridge
- Total length: 2,498 ft (761 m)
- Longest span: 700 ft (213 m) × 2 spans

History
- Opened: December 6, 1963

Statistics
- Toll: Passenger Vehicle: $2.79 (E-ZPass/RiverLink); $4.18 (Pay-By-Plate account); $5.57 (no account); Medium Vehicle: $6.95 (E-ZPass/RiverLink); $8.32 (Pay-By-Plate account); $9.70 (no account); Large Vehicle: $13.84 (E-ZPass/RiverLink); $15.51 (Pay-By-Plate account); $16.62 (no account)

Location
- Interactive map of John F. Kennedy Memorial Bridge

The John F. Kennedy Memorial Bridge is a six-lane, single-deck cantilever bridge that carries southbound Interstate 65 across the Ohio River, connecting Louisville, Kentucky and Jeffersonville, Indiana. The bridge originally carried both directions of Interstate 65, but since 2016, it and the adjacent Abraham Lincoln Bridge form a set of twin bridges both carrying Interstate 65 traffic.

The main span is 700 feet (213 m) (two spans) and the bridge has a total length of 2,498 feet (761 m). The span carries six southbound lanes. It is named after U.S. President John F. Kennedy.

== History ==
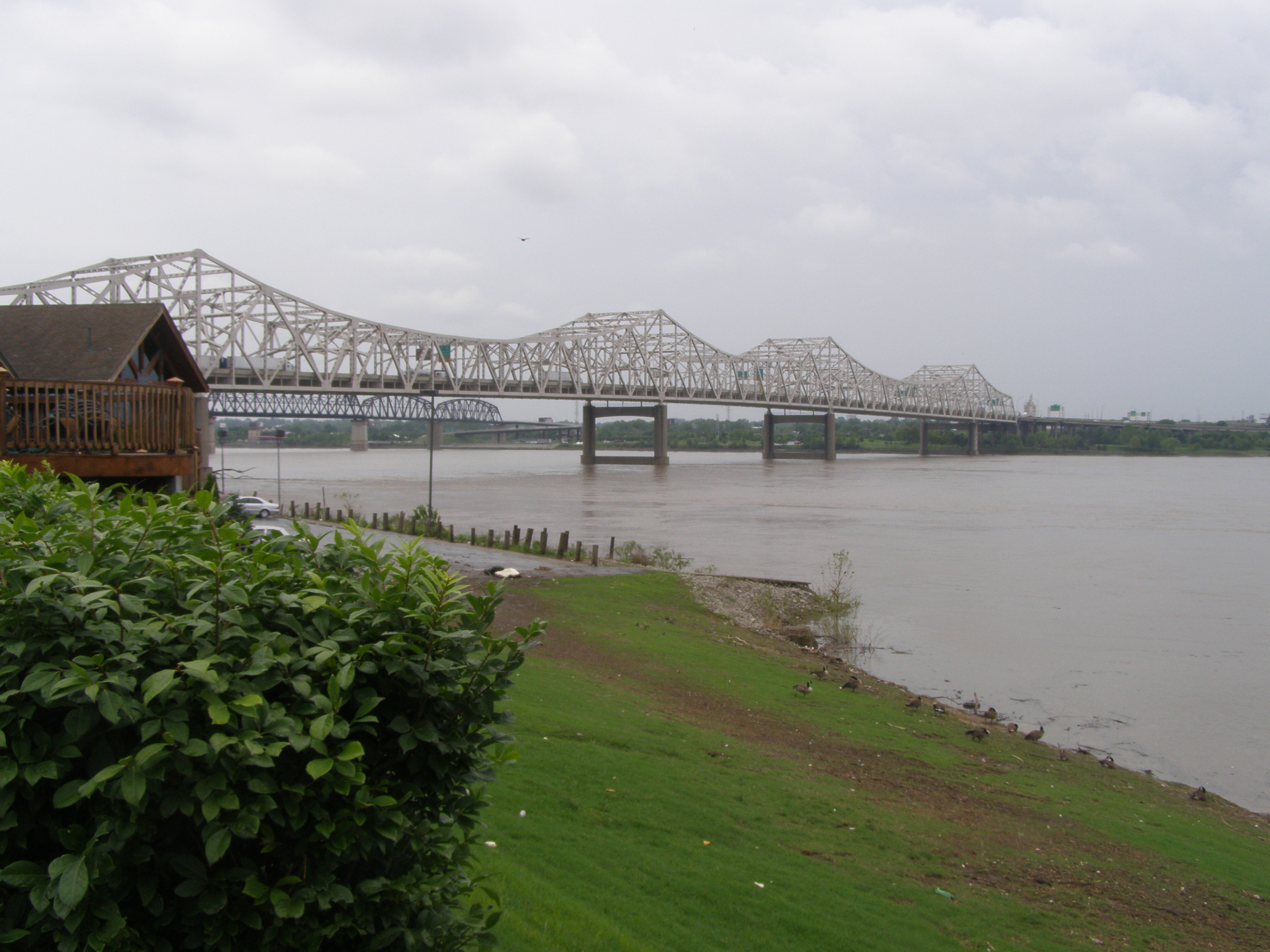
The bridge in 2011, prior to construction of the companion Abraham Lincoln Bridge

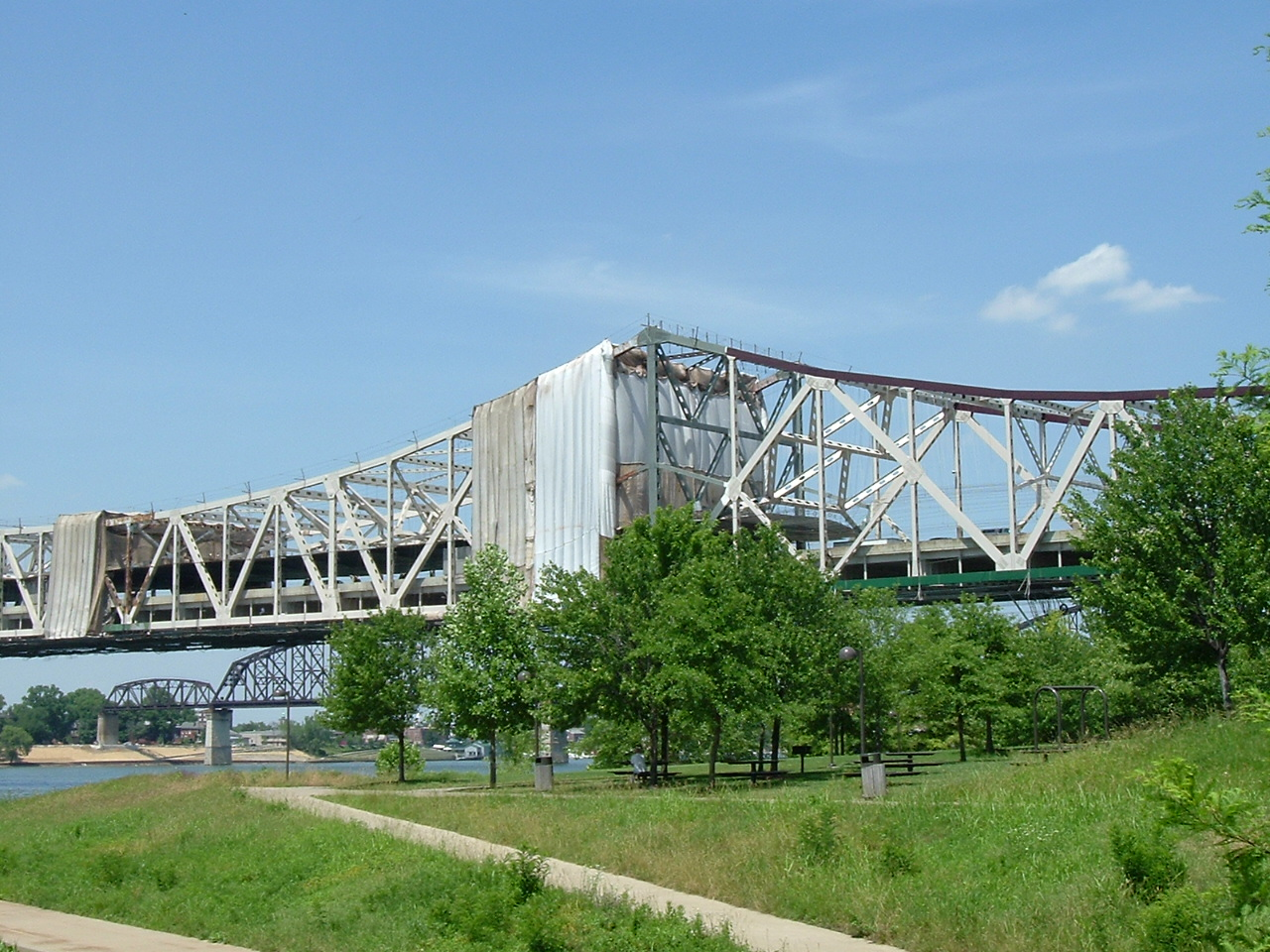
The bridge being repainted in 2007. Note the far right part of the bridge painted in a three-color scheme, originally planned for the whole bridge. This scheme was abandoned and the entire bridge was painted in a light grey.

Designed by the Louisville engineering firm of Hazelet & Erdal, construction began in the spring of 1961 and completed in late 1963 at a cost of $10 million. The span was unnamed when U.S. President John F. Kennedy was assassinated on November 22, 1963. Monsignor John N. Dudine was the first to suggest to the Kentucky Legislature to name the new bridge for President Kennedy. Four days later, Kentucky Governor Bert T. Combs announced that there was wide agreement that the bridge would be named in Kennedy's memory. The bridge was dedicated and opened for northbound traffic on December 6, and southbound traffic began flowing a few weeks later.

Between the late 1990s and 2006, the bridge was covered with rust-like spots and the Kentucky Transportation Cabinet had failed in attempts to rectify this, a subject of local controversy. The state twice paid contractors to repaint the bridge who then failed to do so. The attempts cost over $23 million, with little apparent result. The first of the two contracts, awarded in 1999, ended two years later in a bribery scandal that resulted in criminal prosecution.

In October 2006, the state awarded a $14.7 million contract to Intech Contracting of Lexington to paint half the bridge by the summer of 2007. The new contract differed in that the project was split in two, and the original plans for a three color paint scheme were replaced with a simpler all beige colored one. The very southernmost portion of the bridge was completed in three colors (brown, beige, and green), although this will be painted over.

In May 2008, the painting project was completed at a cost of $60 million which included the two previous failed painting projects.

=== Second span ===
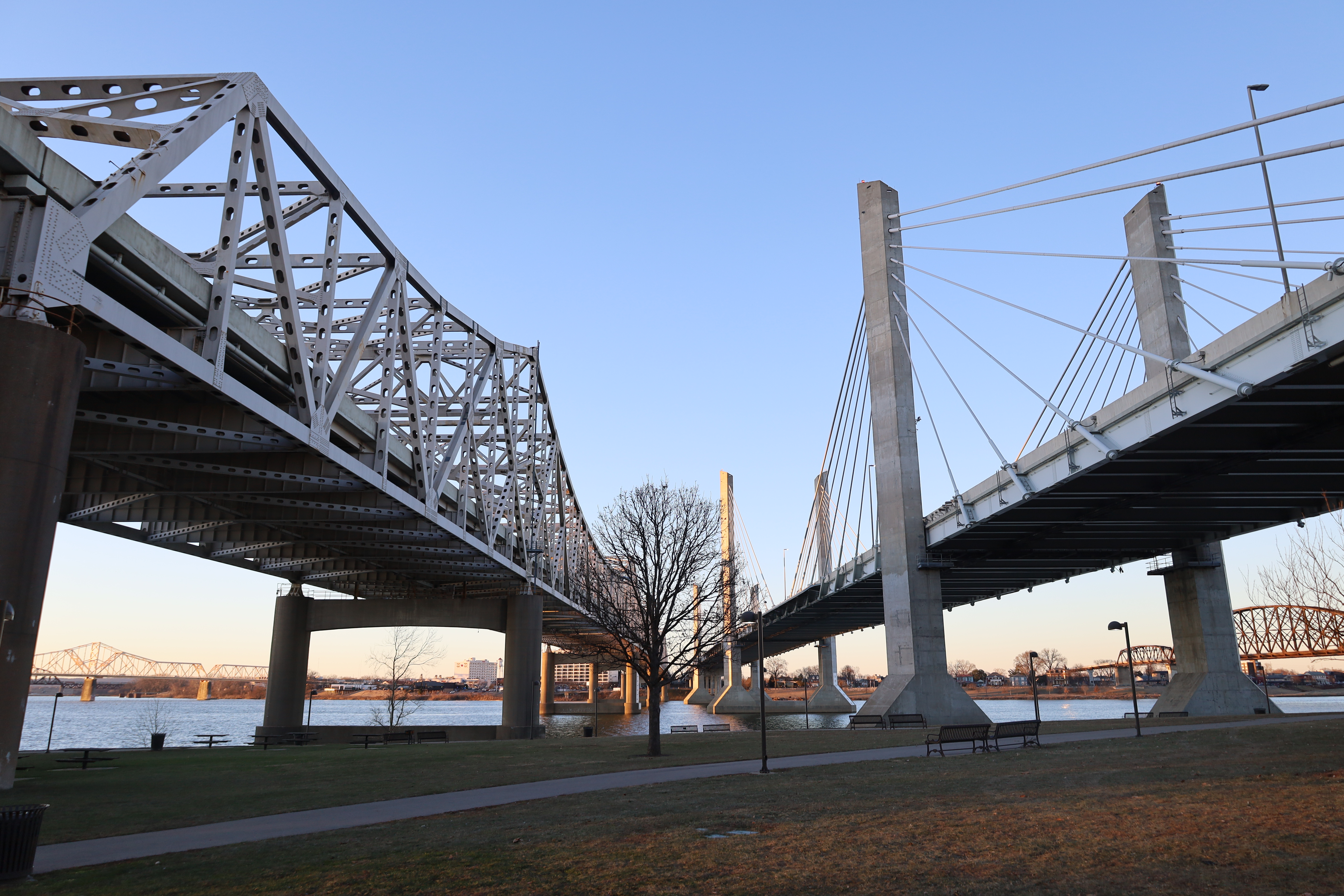
The Kennedy and Lincoln Bridges in 2025

In 2013, Kentucky broke ground on a second span as part of the Ohio River Bridges Project, a project to relieve traffic congestion in the Louisville area. The Abraham Lincoln Bridge, a cable-stayed bridge that opened in December 2015, carried all Interstate 65 traffic over the Ohio River while the Kennedy Bridge received a new deck.

The Kennedy Bridge reopened in three phases during the final months of 2016. The first phase saw one lane reopen on September 30 for traffic traveling from surface streets in Jeffersonville to I-65. In the second phase, which took effect on October 10, the bridge reopened for I-65 through traffic, carrying five lanes of southbound traffic; at the same time, the Lincoln Bridge began carrying only northbound traffic. The final phase was the reopening of the exit ramp from the bridge to westbound I-64, which had been closed for nearly a year, on November 14.

Tolling began in December 2016. The Kennedy Bridge now carries six lanes of southbound I-65 traffic, while the Lincoln Bridge carries six lanes of northbound I-65 traffic.

== See also ==
- Kennedy Interchange ("Spaghetti Junction")
- List of crossings of the Ohio River
- Ohio River Bridges Project, the highway project which included the repurposing of this bridge for southbound traffic only
- List of things named after John F. Kennedy
