= List of airports in Kentucky =

This is a list of airports in Kentucky (a U.S. state), grouped by type and sorted by location. It contains all public-use and military airports in the state. Some private-use and former airports may be included where notable, such as airports that were previously public-use, those with commercial enplanements recorded by the FAA or airports assigned an IATA airport code.

== Airports ==
This list contains the following information:

- **City served** – The city generally associated with the airport, as per the airport's master record with the Federal Aviation Administration. This is not always the actual location since some airports are located in smaller towns outside of the city they serve. It is not meant to be a complete list of cities served, which can be found in or added to each airport's Wikipedia article.
- **FAA** – The location identifier assigned by the Federal Aviation Administration (FAA).
- **IATA** – The airport code assigned by the International Air Transport Association (IATA). Those that do not match the FAA code are shown in bold.
- **ICAO** – The location indicator assigned by the International Civil Aviation Organization (ICAO).
- **Airport name** – The official airport name. Those shown in **bold** indicate the airport has scheduled passenger service on commercial airlines.
- **Role** – One of four FAA airport categories, as per the 2021 National Plan of Integrated Airport Systems (NPIAS) report:
  - P-s: Commercial service – primary are publicly owned airports that receive scheduled passenger service and have more than 10,000 passenger boardings (enplanements) each year. Each primary airport is sub-classified by the FAA as one of the following four "hub" types (s):
    - L: Large hub that accounts for at least 1% of total U.S. passenger enplanements.
    - M: Medium hub that accounts for between 0.25% and 1% of total U.S. passenger enplanements.
    - S: Small hub that accounts for between 0.05% and 0.25% of total U.S. passenger enplanements.
    - N: Nonhub that accounts for less than 0.05% of total U.S. passenger enplanements, but more than 10,000 annual enplanements.
  - CS: Commercial service – nonprimary are publicly owned airports that receive scheduled passenger service and have at least 2,500 passenger boardings each year.
  - R: Reliever airports are designated by the FAA to relieve congestion at a large commercial service airport and to provide more general aviation access to the overall community.
  - GA: General aviation airports are the largest single group of airports in the U.S. airport system. They are public-use airports that do not have scheduled service or have scheduled service with less than 2,500 passenger boardings each year.
- **Enplanements** – The number of enplanements (commercial passenger boardings) that occurred at the airport in calendar year 2024, as per FAA records released 2025.

City served	FAA	IATA	ICAO	Airport name	Role	Enplanements (2024)
				**Commercial service – primary airports**		
Cincinnati/Covington	CVG	CVG	KCVG	**Cincinnati/Northern Kentucky International Airport**	P-M	4,500,414
Lexington	LEX	LEX	KLEX	**Blue Grass Airport**	P-S	776,297
Louisville	SDF	SDF	KSDF	**Louisville Muhammad Ali International Airport** (Standiford Field)	P-S	2,343,305
Owensboro	OWB	OWB	KOWB	**Owensboro–Daviess County Regional Airport**	P-N	8,835
Paducah	PAH	PAH	KPAH	**Barkley Regional Airport**	P-N	13,456
				**Reliever airports**		
Louisville	LOU	LOU	KLOU	Bowman Field	R	156
				**General aviation airports**		
Ashland	DWU		KDWU	Ashland Regional Airport	GA	0
Bardstown	BRY	BRY	KBRY	Samuels Field	GA	0
Bowling Green	BWG	BWG	KBWG	Bowling Green-Warren County Regional Airport	GA	1,287
Cadiz	1M9			Lake Barkley State Park Airport	GA	0
Calvert City	M34			Kentucky Dam State Park Airport	GA	0
Campbellsville	AAS		KAAS	Taylor County Airport	GA	0
Cynthiana	0I8			Cynthiana-Harrison County Airport	GA	0
Danville	DVK		KDVK	Stuart Powell Field	GA	5
Elizabethtown	EKX	EKX	KEKX	Elizabethtown Regional Airport (Addington Field)	GA	0
Falls of Rough	2I3			Rough River State Park Airport	GA	0
Falmouth	K62			Gene Snyder Airport	GA	0
Flemingsburg	FGX		KFGX	Fleming-Mason Airport	GA	0
Frankfort	FFT	FFT	KFFT	Capital City Airport	GA	0
Fulton	1M7			Fulton Airport	GA	0
Georgetown	27K			Georgetown-Scott County Airport (Marshall Field)	GA	3
Glasgow	GLW	GLW	KGLW	Glasgow Municipal Airport	GA	0
Greenville	M21			Muhlenberg County Airport	GA	0
Hardinsburg	I93			Breckinridge County Airport	GA	0
Harlan	I35			Tucker-Guthrie Memorial Airport	GA	0
Hartford	JQD		KJQD	Ohio County Airport	GA	0
Hazard	CPF		KCPF	Wendell H. Ford Airport	GA	0
Henderson	EHR		KEHR	Henderson City-County Airport	GA	21
Hopkinsville	HVC		KHVC	Hopkinsville-Christian County Airport	GA	35
Jackson	JKL		KJKL	Julian Carroll Airport	GA	0
Jamestown	K24			Russell County Airport	GA	0
Leitchfield	M20			Grayson County Airport	GA	0
Lewisport	KY8			Hancock County Airport (Ron Lewis Field)	GA	0
London	LOZ	LOZ	KLOZ	London-Corbin Airport (Magee Field)	GA	3
Madisonville	2I0			Madisonville Municipal Airport	GA	0
Marion	5M9			Marion-Crittenden County Airport	GA	0
Mayfield	M25			Mayfield Graves County Airport	GA	0
Middlesboro	1A6			Middlesboro–Bell County Airport	GA	0
Monticello	EKQ		KEKQ	Wayne County Airport	GA	0
Morehead	SYM		KSYM	Morehead-Rowan County Clyde A. Thomas Regional Airport	GA	0
Mount Sterling	IOB		KIOB	Mount Sterling-Montgomery County Airport	GA	3
Murray	CEY	CEY	KCEY	Murray-Calloway County Airport (Kyle-Oakley Field)	GA	0
Pikeville	PBX	PVL	KPBX	Pike County Airport (Hatcher Field)	GA	0
Pine Knot	18I			McCreary County Airport	GA	0
Prestonsburg	SJS		KSJS	Big Sandy Regional Airport	GA	42
Princeton	2M0			Princeton-Caldwell County Airport	GA	0
Richmond	RGA		KRGA	Central Kentucky Regional Airport (was Madison Airport)	GA	0
Russellville	4M7			Russellville-Logan County Airport	GA	0
Somerset	SME	SME	KSME	Lake Cumberland Regional Airport (was Somerset-Pulaski County Airport)	GA	7
Sparta	8GK			Gallatin County Airport	GA	0
Springfield	6I2			Lebanon-Springfield Airport (George Hoerter Field)	GA	0
Stanton	I50			Stanton Airport	GA	0
Sturgis	TWT		KTWT	Sturgis Municipal Airport	GA	0
Tompkinsville	TZV		KTZV	Tompkinsville-Monroe County Airport	GA	0
West Liberty	9I3			West Liberty Airport	GA	0
Williamsburg	BYL		KBYL	Williamsburg-Whitley County Airport	GA	0
				**Other public-use airports** (not listed in NPIAS)		
Columbia	I96			Columbia-Adair County Airport		
Dawson Springs	8M7			Tradewater Airport		
Liberty	I53			Liberty-Casey County Airport		
Providence	8M9			Providence-Webster County Airport		
				**Other military airports**		
Fort Knox	FTK	FTK	KFTK	Godman Army Airfield		
Hopkinsville	HOP	HOP	KHOP	Campbell Army Airfield (Fort Campbell)		
Lexington	LSD	LSD	KLSD	Blue Grass Station Army Heliport		
				**Private-use airports**		
Paintsville	9KY9			Paintsville-Prestonsburg Combs Field		
				**Known former airports**		
Albany	~~44I~~			Dale Hollow Regional Airport (Petro Field) (closed 2006?)		
Elizabethtown	~~O19~~			Hardin County Airport (Ben Floyd Field) (closed 1979)		
Elkton	~~1M6~~			Standard Field (closed 2006?)		
Morehead	~~I32~~			Morehead-Rowan County Airport (closed 2007)	~~GA~~	
Morganfield				Breckenridge Army Airfield / Morganfield Airport (closed 1998)		
Olive Hill	2I2			Olive Hill Airport (Sellers' Field) (closed indefinitely, FAA record still active)		
Paducah	~~5KY3~~			Farrington Airpark/West Kentucky Airpark (formerly public-use, closed 2000? FAA: FIO)		
Whitesburg		~~BRG~~		Whitesburg Municipal Airport (closed 1990s?)		

== See also ==
- Essential Air Service
- Kentucky World War II Army Airfields
- WikiProject Aviation - Airline destinations in Kentucky
