= Madisonville Airport =

Madisonville Airport may refer to:

- Madisonville Municipal Airport (Kentucky) in Madisonville, Kentucky, United States
- Madisonville Municipal Airport (Texas) in Madisonville, Texas, United States
- Monroe County Airport (Tennessee) in Madisonville, Tennessee, United States
