= Madisonville Municipal Airport =

Madisonville Municipal Airport may refer to:

- Madisonville Municipal Airport (Kentucky) in Madisonville, Kentucky, United States
- Madisonville Municipal Airport (Texas) in Madisonville, Texas, United States
