= KPBX =

KPBX may refer to:

- KPBX-FM, a radio station (91.1 FM) licensed to Spokane, Washington, United States
- Pike County Airport (Kentucky) (ICAO code KPBX)
