= CEY =

CEY may refer to:

- Cononley railway station, England National Rail station code CEY
- Murray-Calloway County Airport, Murray, Kentucky, IATA airport code CEY
- Ron Cey, a former Major League Baseball player
- Sri Lanka, formerly known as Ceylon
- Strand, Western Cape, by vehicle registration code
