= KDVK =

KDVK may refer to:

- Stuart Powell Field (ICAO code KDVK)
- KPGX, a radio station (103.5 FM) licensed to serve Navajo Mountain, Utah, United States, which held the call sign KDVK from 2016 to 2020; see List of radio stations in Utah
