= Wayne County Airport =

Wayne County Airport may refer to:

- Wayne County Airport (Kentucky) in Monticello, Kentucky, United States (FAA: EKQ)
- Wayne County Airport (Ohio) in Wooster, Ohio, United States (FAA: BJJ)
- Detroit Metropolitan Wayne County Airport in Detroit, Michigan, United States (FAA: DTW)
- Jesup-Wayne County Airport in Jesup, Georgia, United States (FAA: JES)
