= Lewis Field (disambiguation) =

Lewis Field can refer to several locations.

== Locations ==
=== Airports ===
- Hancock County Airport in Hancock County, Kentucky is also known as Ron Lewis Field
- McComb-Pike County Airport in Pike County, Mississippi is also known as John E. Lewis Field

=== Research facility ===
- John H. Glenn Research Center at Lewis Field, a NASA research center in Ohio

=== Sports stadiums ===
- Boone Pickens Stadium at Oklahoma State University was previously called Lewis Field
- Lewis Field (Fort Hays State University) is a sports stadium in Hays, Kansas
- Buddy Lewis Field, a baseball stadium at Sims Legion Park in Gastonia, North Carolina

== People ==
- Fielding Lewis, Brother-in-law to George Washington
- Lewis Fielding, psychiatrist of Daniel Ellsberg, target of an office break-in by Watergate burglars seeking to obtain Ellsberg's confidential medical records
