= I32 =

I32 may refer to:

- HMS Versatile (I32), a V-class destroyer of the Royal Navy
- Japanese submarine I-32, a B1 type submarine of the Imperial Japanese Navy
- Morehead-Rowan County Airport, in Rowan County, Kentucky; closed
- i32, a name for the 32-bit signed integer, especially in Rust
