= Ford Airport =

Ford Airport may refer to:

- Ford Airport (Iron Mountain) in Iron Mountain, Michigan, United States (FAA/IATA: IMT)
- Ford Airport (Dearborn) in Dearborn, Michigan, United States (closed 1947)
- Gerald R. Ford International Airport in Grand Rapids, Michigan, United States (FAA/IATA: GRR)
- Wendell H. Ford Airport in Hazard, Kentucky, United States (FAA: K20)
- RNAS Ford, former RAF airfield now the site of Ford Open Prison
