= Blue Grass Airport =

Public airport in Fayette County, Kentucky, U.S.

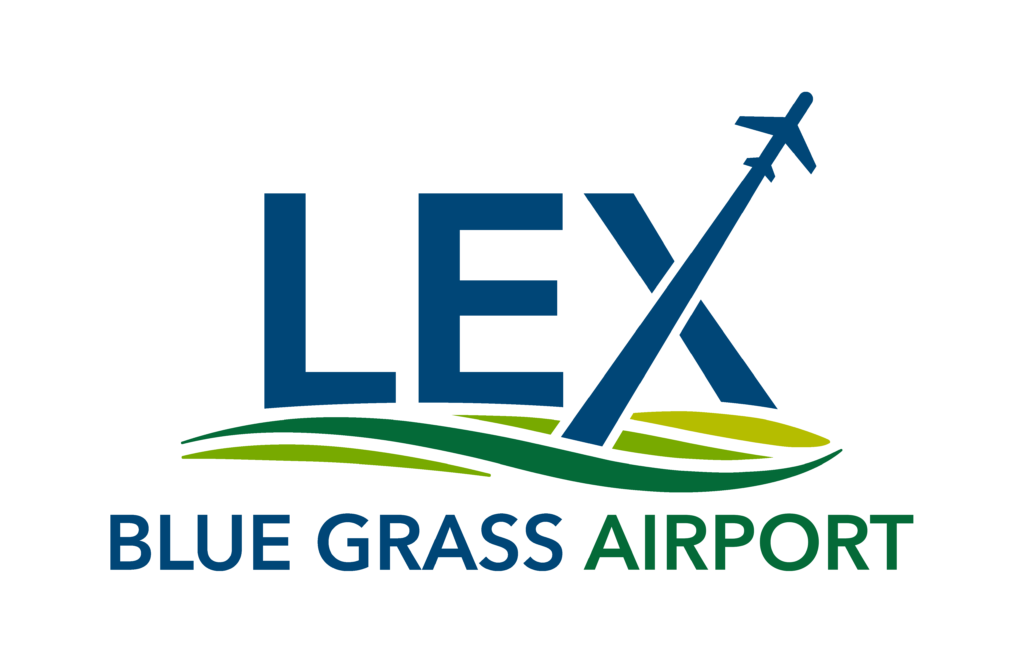

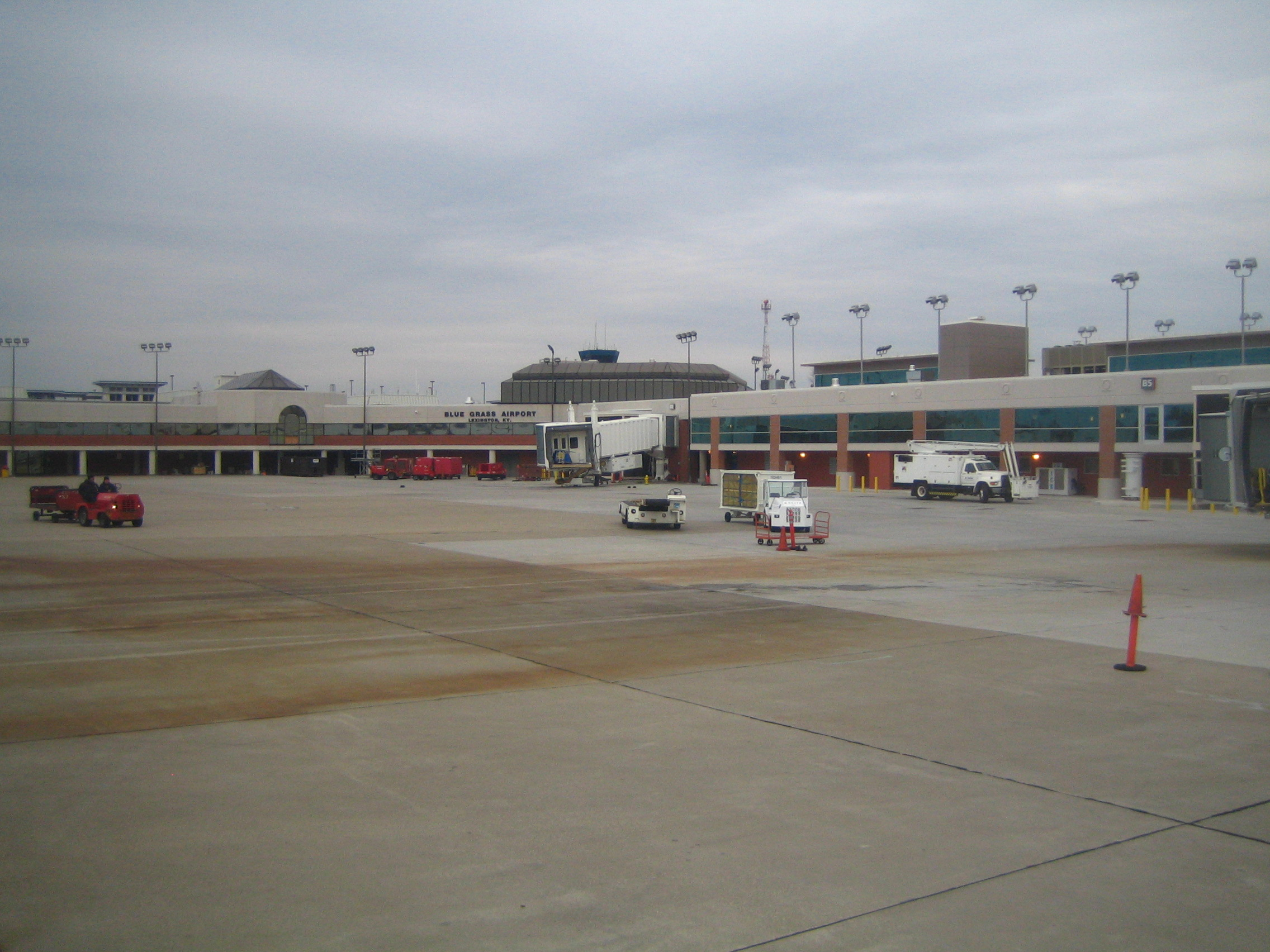
- IATA: LEX; ICAO: KLEX; FAA LID: LEX

Summary
- Airport type: Public
- Owner/Operator: Lexington-Fayette Urban County Airport Board
- Serves: Lexington, Kentucky
- Location: Fayette County
- Elevation AMSL: 979 ft (298 m)
- Coordinates: 38°02′11″N 084°36′21″W
- Website: bluegrassairport.com

Maps
- FAA airport diagram
- Interactive map of Blue Grass Airport

Runways
| Direction | Length | | Surface |
| Direction | ft | m | Surface |
|---|---|---|---|
| 4/22 | 7,004 | 2,135 | Asphalt |
| 9/27 | 4,000 | 1,219 | Concrete |

Statistics (2026 YTD)
- Passenger volume: 1,216,798
- Enplanements: 611,854
- Commercial aircraft operations: 16,892
- Source: Blue Grass Airport, Federal Aviation Administration, BTS

Blue Grass Airport (IATA: LEX, ICAO: KLEX, FAA LID: LEX) is a public airport in Fayette County, Kentucky, United States, 6 miles west of downtown Lexington. Located among horse farms and situated directly across from Keeneland Race Course, Blue Grass Airport is the primary airport serving central and eastern Kentucky. In 2025, LEX served 1,614,053 passengers, an all-time record for the facility, breaking the old record set in 2024. The 2025 passenger totals was 2.7 percent higher than in 2024. Four major airline carriers serve its passengers: Allegiant Air, American Airlines, Delta Air Lines, and United Airlines.

== Features and facilities ==
=== Facilities ===
The airport covers 911 acres (3.69 km^{2}) and has two runways. On August 4, 2010, a new 4,000 foot runway, 9/27, opened replacing the previous 3,500 foot runway, 8/26. The previous runway, which is in a similar location as the new runway except that it overlapped runway 22, was removed after a 2006 crash of a Delta Connection flight, during which all aboard except the co-pilot were killed after an attempted take-off from the wrong, shorter runway. Blue Grass Airport is home to the Aviation Museum of Kentucky, which features more than 25,000 square feet of exhibit space displaying restored aircraft and memorabilia. The current main terminal building opened in 1977. On April 18, 2007, Blue Grass Airport opened an extension of Concourse B, adding six boarding gates with four new jet bridges.

=== Law enforcement and fire protection ===
This airport is protected by the Blue Grass Airport Department of Public Safety, located at 4101 Aviator Road, approximately the middle of the airport. This is an Aircraft Rescue Fire Fighting (ARFF) facility with five apparatus bays, administration and operations, on-site residential living quarters, classroom-style training and physical training facilities, and a flight line watch room. The apparatus bays are located on the level aligned with the airfield, along with the frequently used spaces are located as close as possible to the apparatus bays to minimize response times. All of the DPS officers are trained and certified in law enforcement, firefighting, and EMS. Officers of the DPS work shifts of 24-on and 48-off, which is a typical firefighter's shift. During the 24-hour work shift, they perform all aspects of public safety - law enforcement, firefighting, and EMS. They are required to have 100 hours of fire training every year on top of the 40 hours of law enforcement training each year.

== Economic impact ==
Blue Grass Airport is a catalyst for economic growth in the region, contributing to both the Lexington area and other parts of Kentucky. The airport is an important component of Lexington's economy, providing 3,478 jobs for Lexington and an annual economic impact of $370 million. In addition to commercial passenger service, the airport also offers corporate and general aviation services, including a newly constructed general aviation terminal, U.S. Customs, charter flights, aircraft maintenance, hangars, and flight instruction.

== Passenger numbers ==
The airport is the third busiest airport in Kentucky, behind Cincinnati/Northern Kentucky International Airport (9.1 million passengers/year) and Louisville International Airport (4.2 million passengers/year).

== Airlines and destinations ==
=== Passenger ===
| Airlines | Destinations | Refs |
|---|---|---|
| Allegiant Air | Fort Lauderdale, Orlando/Sanford, Punta Gorda (FL), St. Petersburg/Clearwater, Sarasota; Seasonal: Destin/Fort Walton Beach, Myrtle Beach | |
| American Airlines | Seasonal: Charlotte, Dallas/Fort Worth | |
| American Eagle | Charlotte, Chicago–O'Hare, Dallas/Fort Worth, Philadelphia; Seasonal: Miami | |
| Delta Air Lines | Atlanta | |
| Delta Connection | Detroit, New York–LaGuardia, Washington–National; Seasonal: Minneapolis/St. Paul | |
| United Express | Chicago–O'Hare, Denver | |

Passenger destinations map
Domestic destinations from Blue Grass Airport
Red = Year-round destination
Green = Seasonal destination

== Statistics ==
=== Top destinations ===
Busiest domestic routes from LEX (August 2025 – July 2026)
| Rank | Airport | Passengers | Carriers |
|---|---|---|---|
| 1 | (Georgia (U.S. state)) Atlanta, Georgia | 216,831 | Delta |
| 2 | Chicago, Illinois | 121,444 | American, United |
| 3 | Charlotte, North Carolina | 97,174 | American |
| 4 | Dallas/Fort Worth, Texas | 89,494 | American |
| 5 | Detroit, Michigan | 58,114 | Delta |
| 6 | Orlando–Sanford, Florida | 32,235 | Allegiant |
| 7 | St. Petersburg, Florida | 27,439 | Allegiant |
| 8 | Denver, Colorado | 27,039 | United |
| 9 | Punta Gorda, Florida | 25,571 | Allegiant |
| 10 | Fort Lauderdale, Florida | 20,244 | Allegiant |

=== Airline market share ===
Largest airlines at LEX (November 2024 – October 2025)
| Rank | Airline | Passengers | Share |
|---|---|---|---|
| 1 | Delta Air Lines | 406,000 | 25.75% |
| 2 | PSA Airlines | 287,000 | 18.21% |
| 3 | Allegiant Air | 264,000 | 16.76% |
| 4 | SkyWest Airlines | 255,000 | 16.19% |
| 5 | Envoy Air | 140,000 | 8.88% |
| | Other | 225,000 | 14.23% |

== History ==
Blue Grass Airport began as a municipal airfield that was developed with the assistance of the Federal Civil Works Administration as part of a state-wide airport development policy in 1933. The town share for construction was $1,362 with a portion of $22,427 spent in Lexington overall. Blue Grass Airport opened with a star-shaped layout. In World War II it was used by pilots training at Bowman for dead-stick landing practice in preparation for glider assaults.

The original airport logo was designed by a student who attended and graduated from the University of Kentucky. Dr. Jill Reiling Markey (class of 1978) designed the logo in 1976. The current logo is based on Dr. Markey's design. For her efforts, Dr. Markey was awarded the Commission of Kentucky Colonel by then Governor Julian M. Carroll in 1976.

== Accidents and incidents ==
- November 14, 1970: An Aero Commander 1121 Jet Commander operated by Royal Crown Cola Corp. impacted terrain at a steep angle during a missed approach procedure possibly caused by spatial disorientation, low ceiling and rain. Both occupants were killed.
- December 5, 1987: After suffering an in-flight engine fire en route from Dallas, Texas to New York, the flight crew of a Hawker Siddeley HS.125 business jet, registration number N400PH, touched down short of the runway while attempting an emergency landing. The jet crossed a highway and struck an automobile, utility poles and two fences, killing the pilot and copilot and injuring both passengers in the aircraft and two people in the automobile. The accident was attributed to the crew's inadvertent retraction of the aircraft's flaps, causing the jet to suddenly lose altitude.
- August 30, 2002: A Learjet 35C, registration number N45CP, overran Runway 4 on landing, killing one passenger and seriously injuring four other occupants of the aircraft. The accident was attributed to the pilot's application of additional forward thrust after failing to properly deploy the jet's thrust reversers.
- August 27, 2006: Comair Flight 5191 took off from the general aviation runway 26 instead of the much longer runway 22, overran the runway during takeoff and crashed into the terrain behind the airport. 49 of the 50 people on board died, with the first officer being the sole survivor.
- March 25, 2009: A Cessna 182, registration number N4871N, crashed 3 mi (4.8 km) west of the airport, killing the pilot, who was flying alone. The pilot apparently became disoriented during the landing approach after losing electrical power in densely clouded IFR conditions, but the cause of the crash was not positively determined.

== Popular culture ==
Bluegrass Field was Auric Goldfinger's flight destination in the James Bond film Goldfinger.

== See also ==
- List of airports in Kentucky
- Kentucky World War II Army Airfields
