= KCEY =

KCEY may refer to:

- KLOC, a radio station licensed to Turlock, California, USA which previously used the call sign KCEY
- Murray-Calloway County Airport
