= DVK (disambiguation) =

DVK may refer to:

- DVK, a Soviet PDP-11-compatible personal computer
- Dharmaram Vidya Kshetram, a pontifical university in Bangalore, India
- Dravidar Viduthalai Kazhagam, a social movement in the state of Tamil Nadu
- Demokraticheskiy vybor Kazakhstana, a political party in Kazakhstan
- Diavik Airport, the IATA code DVK
- Stuart Powell Field, the FAA LID code DVK
