= Harrison County Airport =

Harrison County Airport may refer to:

- Harrison County Airport (Ohio) in Cadiz, Ohio, United States (FAA: 8G6)
- Harrison County Airport (Texas) in Marshall, Texas, United States (FAA: ASL)
- Cynthiana-Harrison County Airport in Cynthiana, Kentucky, United States (FAA: 0I8)
