= M97 =

M97 or M-97 may refer to:

- Messier 97, a planetary nebula in the constellation Ursa Major
- Winchester Model 1897, a pump-action shotgun
- M-97 (Michigan highway), a state highway in Michigan
- Morehead-Rowan County Clyde A. Thomas Regional Airport (FAA LID: M97), a public airport located northwest of Morehead, Kentucky, United States
- A naturally-aspirated Porsche flat-six engine
