= KLEX =

KLEX may refer to:

- The ICAO code for Blue Grass Airport, Lexington, Kentucky, United States
- KLEX (AM), a radio station (1570 AM) licensed to Lexington, Missouri, United States
