= KFGX =

KFGX may refer to:

- KFGX-LD, a low-power television station (channel 35) licensed to serve Fargo, North Dakota, United States
- Fleming-Mason Airport (ICAO code KFGX)
