= Sabre Army Heliport =

- IATA: none; ICAO: KEOD; FAA LID: EOD

Summary
- Airport type: Military
- Owner: U.S. Army ATCA-ASO
- Location: Fort Campbell / Clarksville, Tennessee
- Elevation AMSL: 593 ft / 181 m
- Coordinates: 36°34′05″N 087°28′51″W
- Interactive map of Sabre Army Heliport

Runways
Direction	Length		Surface
Direction	ft	m	Surface
4/22	4,451	1,357	Concrete
- Source: Federal Aviation Administration

Sabre Army Heliport (ICAO: KEOD, FAA LID: EOD) is a military use heliport located at Fort Campbell, seven nautical miles (13 km) northwest of the central business district of Clarksville, in Montgomery County, Tennessee, United States. Owned by the United States Army, it has one runway designated 4/22 with a concrete surface measuring 4,451 by 109 feet (1,357 x 33 m).

== History ==
Sabre AHP was built in 1976 to accommodate UH-1 "Huey" helicopters. In 1998, the U.S. Army conducted a study of the heliport at the direction of the U.S. Congress. $19.5 million was appropriated for improvements including widening the landing area to accommodate UH-60 "Blackhawk" helicopters. The Lane Construction Corp. was selected in 2000 to construct a new 1,357-metre (4,452 ft) concrete runway and a 1,240-metre (4,070 ft) parallel taxiway, along with three connecting taxiways, a visual flight rule helipad and runway lighting.

== See also ==
- Campbell Army Airfield
