= Lebanon-Springfield Airport =

- IATA: none; ICAO: none; FAA LID: 6I2

Summary
- Airport type: Public
- Owner: Marion & Washington Counties
- Serves: Springfield / Lebanon, Kentucky
- Location: Washington County, Kentucky
- Elevation AMSL: 871 ft / 265 m
- Coordinates: 37°38′01″N 085°14′31″W
- Website: https://www.fly6i2.com

Map
- Location of airport in Kentucky

Runways
Direction	Length		Surface
Direction	ft	m	Surface
11/29	5,001	1,524	Asphalt

Statistics (2018)
- Aircraft operations: 9,870
- Based aircraft: 20
- Source: Federal Aviation Administration

Lebanon-Springfield Airport (FAA LID: 6I2) is a public use airport in Washington County, Kentucky, United States. It is located three nautical miles (6 km) south of Springfield (in Washington County) and north of Lebanon (in Marion County). The airport is owned by Marion and Washington Counties. It is included in the National Plan of Integrated Airport Systems for 2011–2015, which categorized it as a general aviation facility. The airport began operations in December 1968.

== History ==
Lebanon and Springfield both formed Airport Boards in the late 1950s and early 1960s. Each city attempted to raise local revenue and get the FAA and KDA to commit funds toward the construction of an airport for their city. They were not successful however, due to the difficulty in raising enough local revenue and also commitments from the FAA and KDA could not be obtained.

After experiencing these difficulties, the two Airport Boards joined in recommending to the cities of Lebanon and Springfield and the counties of Washington and Marion, which by joining efforts an airport could be obtained. The City and County governments agreed, and the Marion and Washington County Airport Board was created in June 1962. The first Airport Board consisted of Albert Goatley (Chairman), J.T. Whitlock (Secretary-Treasurer), and Directors, Ben Peterson, Clay Brady, William H. Weatherford, Clifford Begley, and John VanArsdall.

In 1963 the Airport Board employed the firm of Haworth and Associates to begin planning the Lebanon-Springfield Airport. An advance Planning Grant from the FAA was applied for and received to complete the plans. A construction grant was obtained in March 1968 and the T.C. Young Construction Company was the successful bidder to complete the 2800'x60' paved runway. Construction was completed in December 1968 and the airport opened to traffic.

Originally, the airport was planned to be 3,000'x75' paved runway with taxiway and turnarounds at each end, but due to lack of Federal Funds available, only the 2800'x60' could be paved. The runway was graded however, to the planned 3,000'x75' width. A 300'x30' taxiway stub was constructed and 150'x200' apron was completed during the first construction phase. This was completed at a total cost of $273,562.88 of which the local share was $61,750.

== Facilities and aircraft ==
Lebanon-Springfield Airport covers an area of 112 acres (45 ha) at an elevation of 871 feet (265 m) above mean sea level. It has one runway designated 11/29 with an asphalt surface measuring 5,001 by 75 feet (1,524 x 23 m).

For the 12-month period ending April 4, 2018, the airport had 9,870 aircraft operations, an average of 27 per day: 82% general aviation, 16% air taxi, and 2% military. At that time there were 20 aircraft based at this airport: 85% single-engine, 5% helicopter, and 10% ultralight.

== See also ==
- List of airports in Kentucky
