= West Liberty Airport =

- IATA: none; ICAO: none; FAA LID: 9I3

Summary
- Airport type: Public
- Operator: Morgan County
- Location: Morgan County, Kentucky
- Elevation AMSL: 934 ft / 284.7 m
- Coordinates: 37°54′52″N 83°15′07″W

Map
- Location of airport in Kentucky 9I3 (the United States)

Runways
Direction	Length		Surface
Direction	ft	m	Surface
7/25	2,400	732	Asphalt
- Source: Federal Aviation Administration

West Liberty Airport (FAA LID: 9I3) is a public use airport in Morgan County, Kentucky, located 1 mile south of West Liberty. The airport was opened to the public in 1964.

== Facilities and aircraft ==
West Liberty Airport covers an area of 40 acres (16 ha) at an elevation of 934 feet (284.7 m) above mean sea level. It has one asphalt paved runway designated 7/25 which measures 2400 x 60 feet (732 x 18 m). For the 12-month period ending July 12, 2022, the airport had 4,310 aircraft operations, an average of 12 per day: 97% general aviation, 2% air taxi, and 1% military. As of June 22, 2024, 17 aircraft were based at this airport; all 17 being single-engine aircraft.

== See also ==
- List of airports in Kentucky
