= Middlesboro–Bell County Airport =

- IATA: none; ICAO: none; FAA LID: 1A6

Summary
- Airport type: Public
- Owner/Operator: City of Middlesboro
- Time zone: EST (UTC−05:00)
  - Summer (DST): EDT (UTC−04:00)
- Elevation AMSL: 1,154 ft (352 m)
- Coordinates: 36°36′36″N 083°44′14″W

Map
- Location of airport in Kentucky 1A6 (the United States)

Runways
Direction	Length		Surface
Direction	ft	m	Surface
10/28	3,633	1,107	Asphalt

Statistics (2019)
- Aircraft operations (year ending 7/25/2019): 17,550
- Based aircraft: 28
- Source: Federal Aviation Administration

Middlesboro–Bell County Airport, (FAA LID: 1A6) is a city-owned public-use airport located 1 mile (1.6 km) west of the central business district of Middlesboro, a city in Bell County, Kentucky, United States.

Although most airports in the United States use the same three-letter location identifier for the FAA and International Air Transport Association (IATA), this airport is assigned 1A6 by the FAA but has no designation from the IATA.

== Facilities and aircraft ==
Middlesboro–Bell County Airport covers an area of 117 acres (47 ha) at an elevation of 1,154 feet (352 m) above mean sea level. It has one asphalt runway: 10/28 is 3,633 by 75 feet (1,107 x 23 m).

For the 12-month period ending July 25, 2019, the airport had 17,550 aircraft operations, an average of 48 per day: 96% general aviation, 3% air taxi and 1% military. At that time there were 28 aircraft based at this airport: 24 single-engine, and 4 multi-engine.

== See also ==
- List of airports in Kentucky
