= Hopkinsville-Christian County Airport =

- IATA: none; ICAO: KHVC; FAA LID: HVC

Summary
- Airport type: Public
- Owner: City of Hopkinsville
- Serves: Hopkinsville, Kentucky
- Elevation AMSL: 564 ft (172 m)
- Coordinates: 36°51′25″N 087°27′18″W
- Interactive map of Hopkinsville-Christian County Airport

Runways
Direction	Length		Surface
Direction	ft	m	Surface
8/26	5,505	1,678	Asphalt

Statistics (2019)
- Aircraft operations (year ending 11/5/2019): 41,000
- Based aircraft: 38
- Source: Federal Aviation Administration

Hopkinsville-Christian County Airport (ICAO: KHVC, FAA LID: HVC) is a city-owned public-use airport located two nautical miles (3.7 km) east of the central business district of Hopkinsville, a city in Christian County, Kentucky, United States.

Although most U.S. airports use the same three-letter location identifier for the FAA and IATA, this airport is assigned HVC by the FAA but has no designation from the IATA.

== Facilities and aircraft ==
Hopkinsville-Christian County Airport covers an area of 180 acres (73 ha) at an elevation of 564 feet (172 m) above mean sea level. It has one asphalt paved runway designated 8/26 which measures 5,505 by 100 feet (1,678 x 30 m).

For the 12-month period ending November 5, 2019, the airport had 41,000 aircraft operations, an average of 112 per day: 78% general aviation, 15% military, and 7% air taxi. At that time there were 38 aircraft based at this airport: 36 single-engine, 1 multi-engine, and 1 glider.

== See also ==
- List of airports in Kentucky
