= Georgetown-Scott County Airport =

Georgetown Scott County Airport Marshall Field
- IATA: none; ICAO: none; FAA LID: 27K

Summary
- Airport type: Public
- Owner: Georgetown Scott County Airport Corp.
- Serves: Georgetown, Kentucky
- Elevation AMSL: 947 ft (289 m)
- Coordinates: 38°14′04″N 084°26′05″W
- Website: Official site
- Interactive map of Georgetown Scott County Airport

Runways
Direction	Length		Surface
Direction	ft	m	Surface
3/21	5,498	1,676	Asphalt

Statistics (2022)
- Aircraft operations (year ending 6/20/2022): 19,400
- Based aircraft: 75
- Source: Federal Aviation Administration

Georgetown Scott County Airport (FAA LID: 27K), also known as Marshall Field, is a public use airport located six nautical miles (11 km) east of the central business district of Georgetown, a city in Scott County, Kentucky, United States. This airport is owned by the Georgetown Scott County Airport Corp. It is also known as Georgetown-Scott County Regional Airport.

== Facilities and aircraft ==
Georgetown Scott County Airport covers an area of 285 acres (115 ha) at an elevation of 947 feet (289 m) above mean sea level. It has one asphalt paved runway designated 3/21 which measures 5,498 by 100 feet (1,676 x 30 m).

For the 12-month period ending June 20, 2022, the airport had 19,400 aircraft operations, an average of 53 per day: 90% general aviation, 6% air taxi and 4% military. At that time there were 75 aircraft based at this airport: 49 single-engine, 6 multi-engine, 11 jet and 9 helicopter.

== See also ==
- List of airports in Kentucky
