= Paintsville-Prestonsburg Combs Field =

- IATA: none; ICAO: none; FAA LID: 9KY9

Summary
- Airport type: Publicly owned, private use
- Owner: Paintsville-Prestonsburg Air Board
- Serves: Paintsville / Prestonsburg
- Location: Hager Hill, Kentucky
- Elevation AMSL: 624 ft / 190 m
- Coordinates: 37°44′45″N 082°46′45″W

Map

Runways
Direction	Length		Surface
Direction	ft	m	Surface
13/31	3,239	987	Asphalt

Statistics (2005)
- Aircraft operations: 5,830
- Based aircraft: 10
- Source: Federal Aviation Administration

Paintsville-Prestonsburg Combs Field (FAA LID: 9KY9) is a publicly owned, private-use airport located four nautical miles (7 km) southeast of the central business district of Paintsville, in Johnson County, Kentucky, United States. It is owned by the Paintsville-Prestonsburg Air Board which also serves Prestonsburg in Floyd County, Kentucky. The airport officially opened in August 1964.

== Facilities and aircraft ==
Paintsville-Prestonsburg Combs Field covers an area of 25 acres (10 ha) at an elevation of 624 feet (190 m) above mean sea level. It has one asphalt paved runway designated 13/31 which measures 3,239 by 75 feet (987 by 23 meters).

For the 12-month period ending December 21, 2005, the airport had 5,830 aircraft operations, an average of 15 per day: 3,000 itinerant general aviation, 1,500 local general aviation, 1,300 air taxi and 30 military. At that time there were 10 aircraft based at this airport, all single-engine.

== See also ==
- List of airports in Kentucky
