= Elizabethtown Regional Airport =

Addington Field Elizabethtown Regional Airport
- IATA: EKX; ICAO: KEKX; FAA LID: EKX

Summary
- Airport type: Public
- Owner: Elizabethtown Airport Board
- Serves: Elizabethtown, Kentucky
- Elevation AMSL: 776 ft (237 m)
- Coordinates: 37°41′10″N 085°55′30″W
- Website: www.EKXairport.com
- Interactive map of Addington Field

Runways
Direction	Length		Surface
Direction	ft	m	Surface
5/23	6,001	1,829	Asphalt

Statistics (2019)
- Aircraft operations (year ending 12/4/2019): 16,000
- Based aircraft: 56
- Source: FAA and airport website

Elizabethtown Regional Airport (IATA: EKX, ICAO: KEKX, FAA LID: EKX), also known as Addington Field, is a public use airport located four nautical miles (7 km) west of the central business district of Elizabethtown, a city in Hardin County, Kentucky, United States. The airport is owned by the Elizabethtown Airport Board. It is used for general aviation, but current exploration of commercial aviation is underway.

Addington Field opened in 1982. In February 2007, the airport board changed the name to Addington Field / Elizabethtown Regional Airport. The new name appears on airport's website and in its logo, but the Federal Aviation Administration still shows the name as Addington Field (as per the airport's master record effective July 2009).

The airport briefly saw commercial airline service in the late 1980s. Delta Connection, operated by Comair on behalf of Delta Air Lines, provided commuter flights to Cincinnati for about four months in mid-1987. Piedmont Commuter, operated by Jetstream International on behalf of Piedmont Airlines operated commuter flights to Dayton from mid-1987 through early 1988. Cincinnati and Dayton were both large hub cities for Delta and Piedmont at the time.

== Facilities and aircraft ==
Addington Field covers an area of 210 acres (85 ha) at an elevation of 776 feet (237 m) above mean sea level. It has one asphalt tarmac runway designated 5/23 which measures 6,001 by 100 feet (1,829 x 30 m).

For the 12-month period ending December 4, 2019, the airport had 16,000 aircraft operations, an average of 44 per day: 73% general aviation, 12% air taxi and 15% military. At that time there were 56 aircraft based at this airport: 51 single-engine, 4 multi-engine and 1 helicopter.

== Parachute operations ==
Parachuting/Skydiving operations are regularly conducted at Addington Field, inbound aircraft are advised to be cautious and listen to all traffic advisories.

Jumpers exit aircraft over Addington Field from 3,500 to 14,000 feet and are normally seen under canopy returning to earth via a left landing pattern (all left turns at 1,000, 600 and 300 feet); the pattern entrance is wind dependent.

Inbound or outbound pilots should call 270-723-3587 or stop by hangar 2 and ask about the days operations if they are concerned or just interested in jumping and/or parachute rigging services for their emergency pilot rigs (or any other parachute rig).

== Pictures ==
Just after takeoff, heading southwest from runway

Parachuting over Skydive Kentucky drop zone

== See also ==
- List of airports in Kentucky
