= Breckinridge County Airport =

- IATA: none; ICAO: none; FAA LID: I93

Summary
- Airport type: Public
- Operator: Breckinridge County
- Location: Breckinridge County, Kentucky
- Elevation AMSL: 732.1 ft / 223.1 m
- Coordinates: 37°47′05″N 86°26′29″W

Map
- Location of airport in Kentucky I93 (the United States)

Runways
Direction	Length		Surface
Direction	ft	m	Surface
10/28	4,000	1,219	Concrete
- Source: Airnav.com

Breckinridge County Airport (FAA LID: I93) is a public use airport in Breckinridge County, Kentucky, located 1 mile east of Hardinsburg. The airport was opened to the public in 1968.

== Facilities and aircraft ==
Breckinridge County Airport has one concrete paved runway designated 10/28 which measures 4000 x 75 feet (1219 x 23 m). For the 12-month period ending December 5, 2019, the airport had 3,000 aircraft operations, an average of 8 per day: 79% general aviation, 14% air taxi, and 7% military. As of June 28, 2024, 12 aircraft were based at this airport: 11 single-engine and 1 multi-engine.

== See also ==
- List of airports in Kentucky
