= Tucker-Guthrie Memorial Airport =

- IATA: none; ICAO: none; FAA LID: I35

Summary
- Airport type: Public
- Operator: Harlan County
- Location: Harlan County, Kentucky
- Elevation AMSL: 1,564.1 ft / 476.7 m
- Coordinates: 36°51′34″N 83°21′30″W

Map
- Location of airport in Kentucky I35 (the United States)

Runways
Direction	Length		Surface
Direction	ft	m	Surface
8/26	3,461	1,055	Asphalt
- Source: AirNav.com

Tucker-Guthrie Memorial Airport (FAA LID: I35) is a public use airport in Harlan County, Kentucky, located 2 miles northwest of Harlan. The airport was opened to the public in 1961. The airport was named for M. L. Tucker and Pete Guthrie. Tucker was an aviation enthusiast who helped pick the location of the airport, while Guthrie was killed in a crash at the old Harlan County airport in Putney.

== Facilities and aircraft ==
Tucker-Guthrie Memorial Airport has one asphalt paved runway designated 8/26 which measures 3461 x 75 feet (1055 x 23 m). For the 12-month period ending September 1, 2022, the airport had 7,480 aircraft operations, an average of 20 per day: 86% general aviation, 7% air taxi, and 7% military. As of June 22, 2024, 10 aircraft were based at this airport: 7 single-engine, 2 multi-engine, and 1 helicopter.

== Accidents and incidents ==
- November 3, 2022: A Beechcraft A36 Bonanza crashed short of Runway 8 while attempting to land at the airport. The lone occupant, a local doctor, was killed in the crash. The NTSB concluded that the crash occurred due to poor visibility and a lack of planning for the weather by the pilot.

== See also ==
- List of airports in Kentucky
