= Stanton Airport =

- IATA: none; ICAO: none; FAA LID: I50

Summary
- Airport type: Public
- Operator: Powell County Airport Board
- Location: Stanton, Kentucky
- Elevation AMSL: 651 ft / 198.4 m
- Coordinates: 37°51′00″N 83°50′45″W
- Interactive map of Stanton Airport

Runways
Direction	Length		Surface
Direction	ft	m	Surface
6/24	3,000	914	Asphalt

Stanton Airport (FAA LID: I50) is a public airport located one mile (1.6 km) east of the central business district (CBD) of Stanton, a city in Powell County, Kentucky, United States. It covers 69 acres (280,000 m^{2}) with two runways which see over 2500 planes a year.

The airport currently is undergoing renovations and is expected to be completed in 2007, with an additional hangar for three aircraft and an on-site flight school and airframe/mechanic school.

== Runways ==
- Runway 6 - 2780' Asphalt in good condition
- Runway 24 - 3000' Asphalt in good condition

== See also ==
- List of airports in Kentucky
