= Big Sandy Regional Airport =

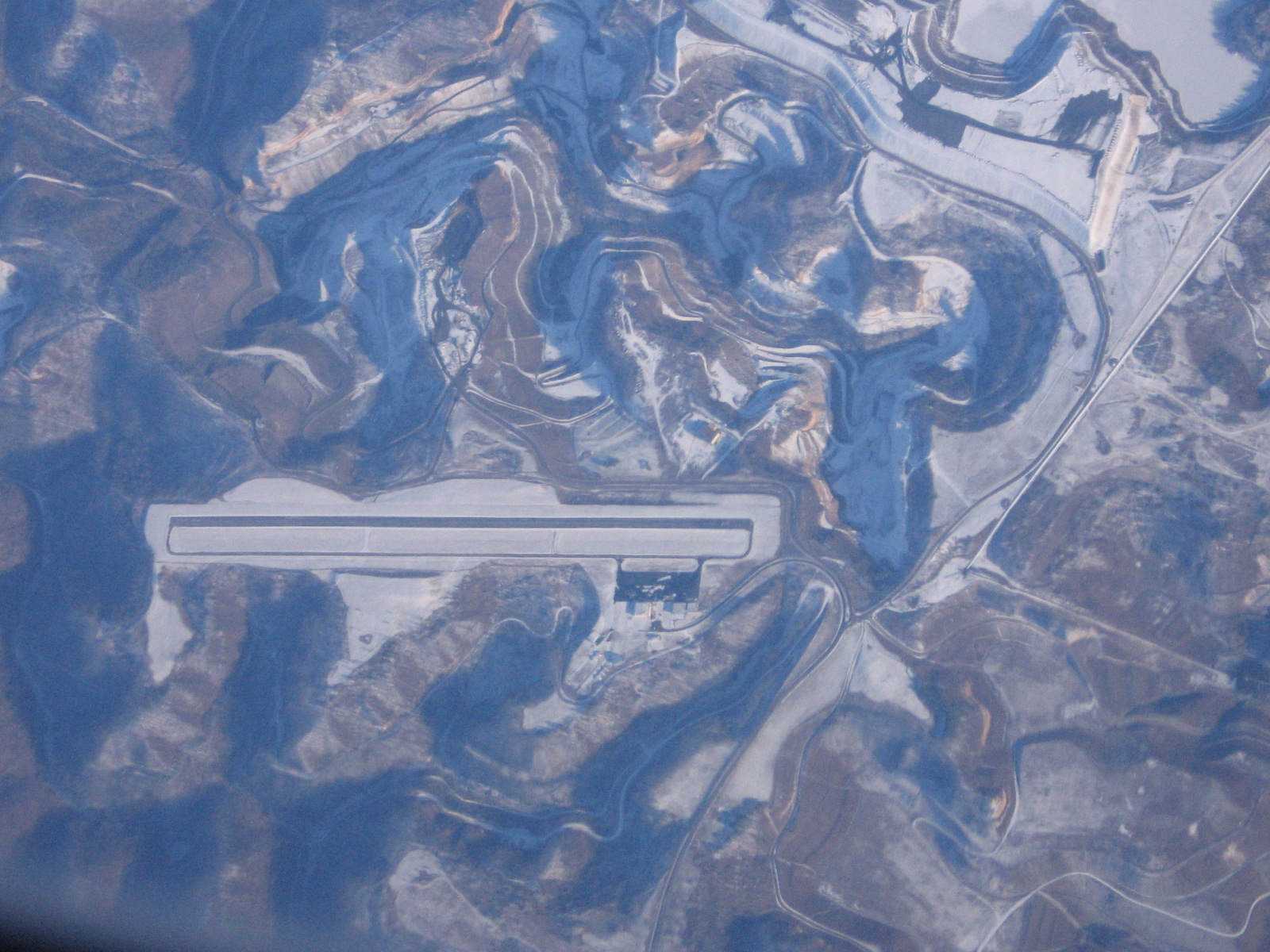
- K22 aerial photo January 21, 2009
- IATA: none; ICAO: KSJS; FAA LID: SJS

Summary
- Airport type: Public
- Owner: Big Sandy Regional Airport Board
- Serves: Prestonsburg, Inez, Paintsville
- Elevation AMSL: 1,221 ft (372 m)
- Coordinates: 37°45′04″N 082°38′12″W
- Website: BigSandyRegional.com
- Interactive map of Big Sandy Regional Airport

Runways
Direction	Length		Surface
Direction	ft	m	Surface
3/21	5,051	1,540	Asphalt

Statistics (2022)
- Aircraft operations (year ending 7/12/2022): 7,580
- Based aircraft: 17
- Source: FAA and airport website

Big Sandy Regional Airport (ICAO: KSJS, FAA LID: SJS, former FAA LID: K22) is a public use airport in southwest Martin County, Kentucky. The airport is ten miles (16 km) northeast of Prestonsburg, a city in Floyd County.

== Facilities ==
The airport covers 136 acres (55 ha) at an elevation of 1,221 feet (372 m). Its single runway, 3/21, is 5,051 by 100 feet (1,540 by 30 m).

In the year ending July 12, 2022, the airport had 7,580 aircraft operations, average 21 per day: 85% general aviation, 12% air taxi and 3% military. 17 aircraft were then based at the airport: 14 single-engine, 1 jet, 1 helicopter, and 1 glider.

== See also ==
- List of airports in Kentucky
