= Mount Sterling-Montgomery County Airport =

- IATA: none; ICAO: KIOB; FAA LID: IOB

Summary
- Airport type: Public
- Owner: Mount Sterling & Montgomery County
- Serves: Mount Sterling, Kentucky
- Elevation AMSL: 1,019 ft / 311 m
- Coordinates: 38°03′29″N 083°58′46″W

Map
- Location of airport in Kentucky IOB (the United States)

Runways
Direction	Length		Surface
Direction	ft	m	Surface
3/21	5,000	1,525	Asphalt

Statistics (2022)
- Aircraft operations (year ending 6/21/2022): 39,918
- Based aircraft: 78
- Source: Federal Aviation Administration

Mount Sterling-Montgomery County Airport (ICAO: KIOB, FAA LID: IOB) is a public use airport located two nautical miles (4 km) west of the central business district of Mount Sterling, a city in Montgomery County, Kentucky, United States. It is owned by the city of Mount Sterling and Montgomery County.

Although most U.S. airports use the same three-letter location identifier for the FAA and IATA, this airport is assigned IOB by the FAA but has no designation from the IATA.

== Facilities and aircraft ==
Mount Sterling-Montgomery County Airport covers an area of 53 acres (21 ha) at an elevation of 1,019 feet (311 m) above mean sea level. It has one asphalt paved runway designated 3/21 which measures 5,000 by 75 feet (1,524 x 23 m).

For the 12-month period ending June 21, 2022, the airport had 39,918 aircraft operations, an average of 109 per day: 86% general aviation, 12% air taxi and 2% military. At that time there were 78 aircraft based at this airport: 59 single-engine, 13 multi-engine, 2 jet and 4 helicopter.

== See also ==
- List of airports in Kentucky
