= Muhlenberg County Airport =

- IATA: none; ICAO: none; FAA LID: M21

Summary
- Airport type: Public
- Operator: Muhlenberg County
- Location: Muhlenberg County, Kentucky
- Elevation AMSL: 428.2 ft / 130.5 m
- Coordinates: 37°13′34″N 87°09′23″W

Map
- Location of airport in Kentucky M21 (the United States)

Runways
Direction	Length		Surface
Direction	ft	m	Surface
6/24	4,999	1,524	Asphalt
- Source: Airnav.com

Muhlenberg County Airport (FAA LID: M21) is a public use airport in Muhlenberg County, Kentucky, located 2 miles northeast of Greenville. The airport was opened to the public in 1960.

== Facilities and aircraft ==
Muhlenberg County Airport has one asphalt paved runway designated 6/24 which measures 4,999 x 75 feet (1,524 x 23 m). For the 12-month period ending November 5, 2019, the airport had 9,075 aircraft operations, an average of 25 per day: 82% general aviation, 12% air taxi, and 6% military. As of June 24, 2024, 17 aircraft were based at this airport: 13 single-engine, 1 multi-engine, 1 jet, and 1 helicopter.

== See also ==
- List of airports in Kentucky
