= Ohio County Airport =

- IATA: none; ICAO: KJQD; FAA LID: JQD

Summary
- Airport type: Public
- Operator: Ohio County
- Location: Ohio County, Kentucky
- Elevation AMSL: 1,010.3 ft / 307.9 m
- Coordinates: 37°27′31″N 86°50′59″W

Map
- Location of airport in Kentucky JQD (the United States)

Runways
Direction	Length		Surface
Direction	ft	m	Surface
3/21	5,003	1,525	Asphalt
- Source: Airnav.com

Ohio County Airport (ICAO: KJQD, FAA LID: JQD) is a public use airport in Ohio County, Kentucky, located 3 miles northeast of Hartford. The airport was opened to the public in 1984.

== Facilities and aircraft ==
Ohio County Airport has one asphalt paved runway designated 3/21 which measures 5003 x 75 feet (1525 x 23 m). For the 12-month period ending November 18, 2020, the airport had 8,175 aircraft operations, an average of 22 per day: 94% general aviation, 4% air taxi, and 2% military. As of June 28, 2024, 11 aircraft were based at this airport: 10 single-engine and 1 multi-engine.

== See also ==
- List of airports in Kentucky
