= Gene Snyder Airport =

- IATA: none; ICAO: none; FAA LID: K62

Summary
- Airport type: Public
- Operator: Dan Bell
- Location: Pendleton County, Kentucky
- Elevation AMSL: 899.4 ft / 274 m
- Coordinates: 38°42′15″N 84°23′31″W

Map
- Location of airport in Kentucky K62 (the United States)

Runways
| Direction | Length | | Surface |
| Direction | ft | m | Surface |
|---|---|---|---|
| 3/21 | 3,994 | 1,217 | Asphalt |
- Source: Airnav.com

Gene Snyder Airport (FAA LID: K62) is a public use airport in Pendleton County, Kentucky, located 4 miles northwest of Falmouth. The airport was opened to the public in 1984 and was named after Gene Snyder, a United States Representative from Kentucky.

== Facilities and aircraft ==
Gene Snyder Airport has one asphalt paved runway designated 3/21 which measures 3994 x 75 feet (1217 x 23 m). For the 12-month period ending June 24, 2022, the airport had 4,790 aircraft operations, an average of 13 per day: 93% general aviation, 4% air taxi, and 3% military. As of June 22, 2024, 14 aircraft were based at this airport: 12 single-engine, 1 multi-engine, and 1 helicopter.

== See also ==
- List of airports in Kentucky
