= Russell County Airport =

- IATA: none; ICAO: none; FAA LID: K24

Summary
- Airport type: Public
- Operator: Russell County
- Location: Russell County, Kentucky
- Elevation AMSL: 1,010.3 ft / 307.9 m
- Coordinates: 37°00′35″N 85°06′10″W

Map
- Location of airport in Kentucky K24 (the United States)

Runways
Direction	Length		Surface
Direction	ft	m	Surface
17/35	5,010	1,527	Asphalt
- Source: Airnav.com

Russell County Airport (FAA LID: K24) is a public use airport in Russell County, Kentucky, located 2 miles northwest of Jamestown. The airport was opened to the public in 1994.

== Facilities and aircraft ==
Russell County Airport has one asphalt paved runway designated 17/35 which measures 5010 × 78 feet (1527 × 24 m). For the 12-month period ending April 4, 2018, the airport had 8,990 aircraft operations, an average of 25 per day: 96% general aviation, 2% air taxi, and 2% military. As of June 28, 2024, 13 aircraft were based at this airport: 9 single-engine, 3 multi-engine, and 1 jet.

== See also ==
- List of airports in Kentucky
