= Williamsburg-Whitley County Airport =

- IATA: none; ICAO: KBYL; FAA LID: BYL

Summary
- Airport type: Public
- Operator: Whitley County
- Location: Whitley County, Kentucky
- Elevation AMSL: 1,177.7 ft / 359 m
- Coordinates: 36°47′42″N 84°11′58″W

Map
- Location of airport in Kentucky BYL (the United States)

Runways
Direction	Length		Surface
Direction	ft	m	Surface
2/20	5,499	1,676	Asphalt
- Source: Airnav.com

Williamsburg-Whitley County Airport (ICAO: KBYL, FAA LID: BYL) is a public use airport in Whitley County, Kentucky, located 4 miles northwest of Williamsburg. The airport was opened to the public in 2005.

== Facilities and aircraft ==
Williamsburg-Whitley County Airport has one asphalt paved runway designated 2/20 which measures 5499 x 100 feet (1676 x 30 m). For the 12-month period ending April 16, 2021, the airport had 5,500 aircraft operations, an average of 15 per day: 72% general aviation, 27% air taxi, and 1% military. As of July 10, 2024, 14 aircraft were based at this airport, all of which are single-engine.

== See also ==
- List of airports in Kentucky
