= Morehead-Rowan County Clyde A. Thomas Regional Airport =

- IATA: none; ICAO: KSYM; FAA LID: SYM

Summary
- Airport type: Public
- Owner: Morehead-Rowan County Airport Board
- Serves: Morehead, Kentucky
- Elevation AMSL: 1,028 ft / 313 m
- Coordinates: 38°12′54″N 083°35′15″W
- Interactive map of Morehead-Rowan County; Clyde A. Thomas Regional Airport

Runways
Direction	Length		Surface
Direction	ft	m	Surface
2/20	5,500	1,676	Asphalt
- Source: Federal Aviation Administration

Morehead-Rowan County Clyde A. Thomas Regional Airport (ICAO: KSYM, FAA LID: SYM), is a public airport located seven nautical miles (13 km) northwest of the central business district of Morehead, a city in Rowan County, Kentucky, United States. It is owned by the Morehead-Rowan County Airport Board.

The airport board began construction on this airport in 2003, in order to accommodate a longer runway than the existing Morehead-Rowan County Airport (FAA LID: I32) at 38°08′00″N 83°32′17″W. The new airport opened in 2007, which resulted in the closure of the old airport.

== Facilities and aircraft ==
Morehead-Rowan County Clyde A. Thomas Regional Airport covers an area of 325 acres (132 ha) which contains one runway designated 2/20 with a 5,500 x 100 ft (1,676 x 30 m) asphalt surface.

== See also ==
- List of airports in Kentucky
