= Olive Hill Airport =

Olive Hill Airport Sellers' Field
- IATA: none; ICAO: none; FAA LID: 2I2

Summary
- Airport type: Public
- Owner: City of Olive Hill
- Serves: Olive Hill, Kentucky
- Elevation AMSL: 1,030 ft / 314 m
- Coordinates: 38°15′06″N 083°08′36″W
- Interactive map of Olive Hill Airport

Runways
Direction	Length		Surface
Direction	ft	m	Surface
2/20	2,500	762	Asphalt

Statistics (2010)
- Aircraft operations: 50
- Based aircraft: 3
- Source: Federal Aviation Administration

Olive Hill Airport (FAA LID: 2I2), also known as Sellers' Field, was a city-owned, public-use airport located three nautical miles (6 km) southeast of the central business district of Olive Hill, a city in Carter County, Kentucky, United States. The airport was closed in 2010 due to lack of maintenance. As of 2025, the runway still remains, but is now on private property.

== Facilities and aircraft ==
The airport covers an area of 31 acres (13 ha) at an elevation of 1,030 feet (314 m) above mean sea level. It has one runway designated 2/20 with an asphalt surface measuring 2,500 by 50 feet (762 x 15 m).

For the 12-month period ending September 27, 2010, the airport had 50 general aviation aircraft operations. At that time there were 3 aircraft based at this airport, all single-engine.
