= Pike County Airport (Kentucky) =

Pike County Airport Hatcher Field
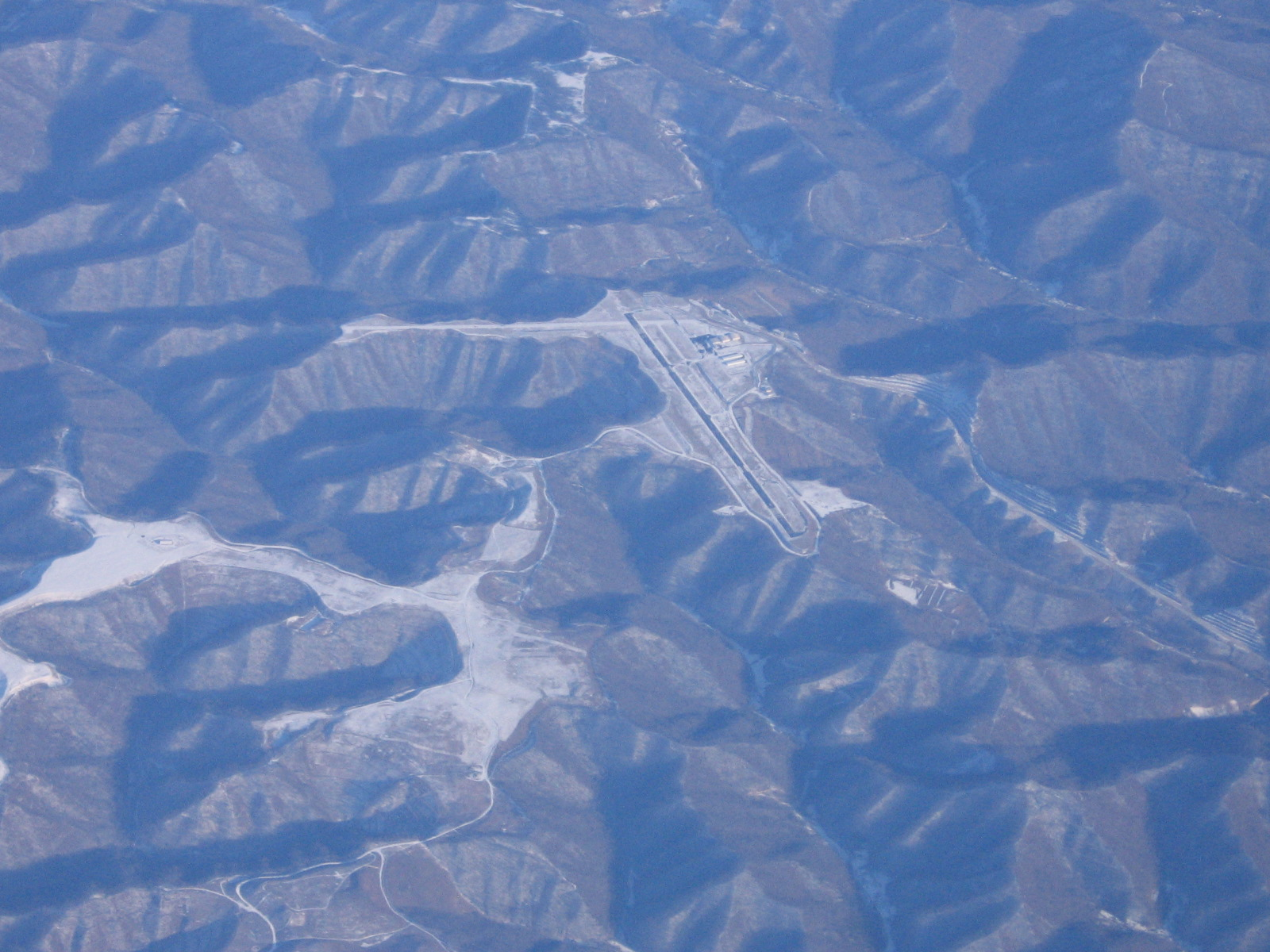
- IATA: PVL; ICAO: KPBX; FAA LID: PBX

Summary
- Airport type: Public
- Owner: Pike County Regional Airport Board
- Serves: Pikeville, Kentucky
- Elevation AMSL: 1,473 ft (449 m)
- Coordinates: 37°33′42″N 082°33′59″W
- Interactive map of Pike County Airport

Runways
Direction	Length		Surface
Direction	ft	m	Surface
9/27	5,350	1,631	Asphalt
2/20 (closed)	3,600	1,097	Asphalt

Statistics (2009)
- Aircraft operations: 8,722
- Based aircraft: 23
- Source: Federal Aviation Administration

Pike County Airport (IATA: PVL, ICAO: KPBX, FAA LID: PBX), also known as Hatcher Field, is a public-use airport in Pike County, Kentucky, United States. It is owned by the Pike County Regional Airport Board and located six nautical miles (11 km) northwest of the central business district of Pikeville, Kentucky. This airport is included in the FAA's National Plan of Integrated Airport Systems for 2009–2013, which categorized it as a general aviation facility.

From October 24, 2014, to July 24, 2015, Pike County Airport had nonstop scheduled airline service called Appalachian Air to Nashville International Airport. The service was operated by Corporate Flight Management on Jetstream 31 aircraft.

Many U.S. airports use the same three-letter location identifier for the FAA and IATA. However, this airport is assigned PBX by the FAA but has been assigned PVL from the IATA.

== Facilities and aircraft ==
Pike County-Hatcher Field covers an area of 46 acres (19 ha) at an elevation of 1,473 feet (449 m) above mean sea level. It has two asphalt paved runways: 9/27 is 5,350 by 100 feet (1,631 x 30 m) and 2/20 is 3,600 by 75 feet (1,097 x 23 m). Only runway 9/27 is open for aircraft operations; runway 2/20 is closed indefinitely.

For the 12-month period ending September 30, 2009, the airport had 8,722 aircraft operations, an average of 23 per day: 87% general aviation, 11% air taxi, and 2% military. At that time there were 23 aircraft based at this airport: 83% single-engine and 17% multi-engine.

== See also ==
- List of airports in Kentucky
