= Wendell H. Ford Airport =

Coordinates: 37°23′15″N 083°15′42″W

- IATA: none; ICAO: KCPF; FAA LID: CPF (formerly K20)

Summary
- Airport type: Public
- Owner: Hazard-Perry County Board
- Serves: Hazard, Kentucky
- Elevation AMSL: 1,253 ft / 382 m
- Interactive map of Wendell H. Ford Airport

Runways
Direction	Length		Surface
Direction	ft	m	Surface
14/32	5,500	1,676	Asphalt
6/24	3,250	991	Asphalt

Statistics (2006)
- Aircraft operations: 10,200
- Source: Federal Aviation Administration

Wendell H. Ford Airport (ICAO: KCPF, FAA LID: CPF (formerly K20)) is a public airport located 10 miles (16 km) northwest of the central business district of Hazard, a city in Perry County, Kentucky, United States. It is named for former Kentucky Senator and Governor Wendell H. Ford.

== Facilities and aircraft ==
Wendell H. Ford Airport covers an area of 37 acres (15 ha) which contains two asphalt paved runways: 14/32 measuring 5,500 x 100 ft (1,676 x 30 m) and 6/24 measuring 3,250 x 60 ft (991 x 18 m). For the 12-month period ending September 21, 2006, the airport had 10,200 aircraft operations, an average of 27 per day: 85% general aviation, 13% air taxi and 2% military.

== See also ==
- List of airports in Kentucky
