= Wayne County Airport (Kentucky) =

- IATA: none; ICAO: KEKQ; FAA LID: EKQ

Summary
- Airport type: Public
- Owner: Wayne Co. Arpt Board
- Serves: Monticello, Kentucky
- Elevation AMSL: 963 ft / 294 m
- Coordinates: 36°51′19″N 084°51′22″W
- Interactive map of Wayne County Airport

Runways
| Direction | Length | | Surface |
| Direction | ft | m | Surface |
|---|---|---|---|
| 3/21 | 4,000 | 1,219 | Asphalt |

Statistics (2021)
- Aircraft operations (year ending 4/13/2021): 8,640
- Based aircraft: 10
- Source: Federal Aviation Administration

Wayne County Airport (ICAO: KEKQ, FAA LID: EKQ) is a public use airport located two nautical miles (3.7 km) north of the central business district of Monticello, a city in Wayne County, Kentucky, United States. It is owned by the Wayne County Airport Board. According to the FAA's National Plan of Integrated Airport Systems for 2009–2013, it is categorized as a general aviation facility.

Although many U.S. airports use the same three-letter location identifier for the FAA and IATA, this facility is assigned EKQ by the FAA but has no designation from the IATA.

== Facilities and aircraft ==
Wayne County Airport covers an area of 121 acres (49 ha) at an elevation of 963 feet (294 m) above mean sea level. It has one runway designated 3/21 with an asphalt surface measuring 4,000 by 75 feet (1,219 x 23 m).

For the 12-month period ending April 13, 2021, the airport had 8,640 aircraft operations, an average of 24 per day: 90% general aviation, 9% air taxi, and 2% military. At that time there were 10 aircraft based at this airport: all single-engine.

== See also ==
- List of airports in Kentucky
