= Cynthiana-Harrison County Airport =

- IATA: none; ICAO: none; FAA LID: 0I8

Summary
- Airport type: Public
- Owner: Cynthiana-Harrison County Airport Board
- Serves: Harrison County
- Location: Cynthiana, Kentucky
- Elevation AMSL: 721 ft (220 m)
- Coordinates: 38°21′58″N 084°17′00″W
- Website: www.ky0i8.com
- Interactive map of Cynthiana-Harrison County Airport

Runways
Direction	Length		Surface
Direction	ft	m	Surface
11/29	3,850	1,173	Asphalt

Statistics (2021)
- Aircraft operations (year ending 4/26/2021): 13,554
- Based aircraft: 28
- Source: Federal Aviation Administration

Cynthiana-Harrison County Airport (FAA LID: 0I8) is a public use airport located two nautical miles (3.7 km) south of the central business district of Cynthiana, in Harrison County, Kentucky, United States. It is owned by the Cynthiana-Harrison County Airport Board.

== Facilities and aircraft ==
Cynthiana-Harrison County Airport covers an area of 100 acres (40 ha) at an elevation of 721 feet (220 m) above mean sea level. It has one asphalt paved runway designated 11/29 which measures 3,850 by 75 feet (1,173 x 23 m).

For the 12-month period ending April 26, 2021, the airport had 13,554 aircraft operations, an average of 37 per day: 95% general aviation, 3% air taxi and 2% military. At that time there were 28 aircraft based at this airport: 27 single-engine, and 1 multi-engine.

== See also ==
- List of airports in Kentucky
