= Campbell Army Airfield =

Airport in Kentucky, United States

- IATA: HOP; ICAO: KHOP; FAA LID: HOP

Summary
- Airport type: Military
- Owner: United States Army
- Location: Fort Campbell, Christian County, Kentucky, near Hopkinsville, Kentucky
- Elevation AMSL: 573 ft (175 m)
- Coordinates: 36°40′20″N 087°29′33″W
- Interactive map of Campbell Army Airfield

Runways
Direction	Length		Surface
Direction	ft	m	Surface
5/23	11,826	3,605	Asphalt
18/36	4,500	1,372	Asphalt
- Source: Federal Aviation Administration

Campbell Army Airfield (IATA: HOP, ICAO: KHOP, FAA LID: HOP) is a military airport at Fort Campbell, which is located near Hopkinsville, a city in Christian County, Kentucky, United States.

Previously Campbell Air Force Base, a U.S. Air Force installation from 1947 to 1959, this U.S. Army airfield has two asphalt paved runways: 5/23 is 11,826 by 200 feet (3,605 × 61 m) and 18/36 is 4,500 by 150 feet (1,372 × 46 m).

The airfield currently houses UH-60M, CH-47F, and AH-64D helicopters belonging to the 101st Combat Aviation Brigade, and MH-60M, MH-60M DAP, MH-47G, and MH-6/AH-6M helicopters of 1st Battalion, 2d Battalion, and Special Operations Aviation Training Battalion of the 160th Special Operations Aviation Regiment (Airborne). It was also home to elements of the 159th Combat Aviation Brigade, before the brigade was deactivated in 2015.

== Current units ==
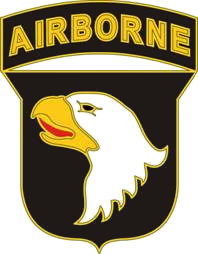
101st Combat Aviation Brigade 101st Airborne Division ("Wings of Destiny")(♦)

- Brigade Headquarters and Headquarters Company ("Hell Cats")
- 1st Battalion, 101st Aviation Regiment ("Expect No Mercy")
- 5th Battalion, 101st Aviation Regiment ("Eagle Assault")
- 6th Battalion, 101st Aviation Regiment (General Support) ("Shadow of the Eagle")
- 7th Battalion, 101st Aviation Regiment (Heavy Lift) ("Eagle Lift")
- 96th Aviation Support Battalion ("Troubleshooters")

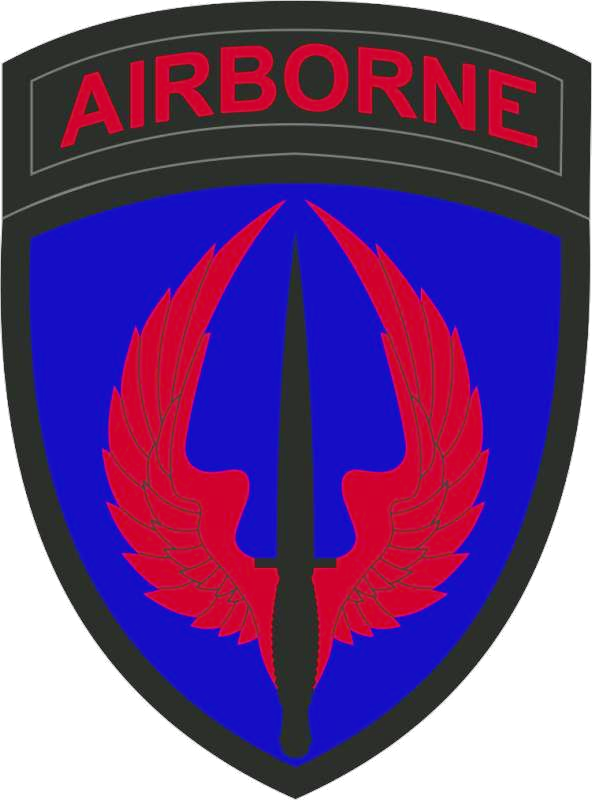
160th Special Operations Aviation Regiment (Airborne)

- Regimental Headquarters and Headquarters Company
- USASOAC Special Operations Training Battalion (co-led by the 160th SOAR(A))
- 1st Battalion, 160th SOAR(A)
- 2nd Battalion, 160th SOAR(A)

== See also ==
- Sabre Army Heliport
- Kentucky World War II Army Airfields
