= Kentucky World War II Army Airfields =

United States World War II army airfields

Kentucky World War II Army Airfields
- Part of United States Army

Site information
- Type: Army Airfields

Site history
- Built: 1940-1944
- In use: 1940-present

During World War II, the United States Army Air Forces (USAAF) established numerous airfields in Kentucky for training pilots and aircrews of USAAF fighters and bombers.

Most of these airfields were under the command of First Air Force or the Army Air Forces Training Command (AAFTC). However the other USAAF support commands (Air Technical Service Command (ATSC); Air Transport Command (ATC) or Troop Carrier Command) commanded a significant number of airfields in a support roles.

It is still possible to find remnants of these wartime airfields. Many were converted into municipal airports, some were returned to agriculture and several were retained as United States Air Force installations and were front-line bases during the Cold War. Hundreds of the temporary buildings that were used survive today, and are being used for other purposes.

== Major airfields ==
First Air Force

- Godman AAF, Fort Knox

Support for Fort Knox
99th Army Air Force Base Unit
Was: Godman Air Force Base (1947-1954)
Now: active United States Army Airfield (IATA: FTK, ICAO: KFTK, FAA LID: FTK)

- Campbell AAF, Fort Campbell/Hopkinsville

Sub-base of Smyrna AAF, Tennessee
99th Army Air Force Base Unit (DET)
Was: Campbell Air Force Base (1947-1959)
Now: active United States Army Airfield (IATA: HOP, ICAO: KHOP, FAA LID: HOP)

Air Technical Service Command

- Louisville MAP, Louisville

Aircraft Modification Center
Now: Louisville International Airport and Louisville Air National Guard Base (IATA: SDF, ICAO: KSDF, FAA LID: SDF)

Troop Carrier Command

- Bowman Field AAF, Louisville

AAF Convalescent Hospital
27th Army Air Force Base Unit
Now: Bowman Field Airport (IATA: LOU, ICAO: KLOU, FAA LID: LOU)
- Lexington/Bluegrass AAF, Lexington

Auxiliary to Bowman AAF
Now: Blue Grass Airport (IATA: LEX, ICAO: KLEX, FAA LID: LEX)
