= Hancock County Airport =

Hancock County Airport Ron Lewis Field
- IATA: none; ICAO: none; FAA LID: KY8

Summary
- Airport type: Public
- Owner: Hancock County Airport Board
- Serves: Lewisport, Kentucky
- Elevation AMSL: 411 ft (125 m)
- Coordinates: 37°57′12″N 086°51′26″W
- Interactive map of Hancock County Airport

Runways
Direction	Length		Surface
Direction	ft	m	Surface
5/23	4,000	1,219	Asphalt
- Source: Federal Aviation Administration

Hancock County Airport (FAA LID: KY8), also known as Ron Lewis Field, is a public use airport located three nautical miles (6 km) northeast of the central business district of Lewisport, in Hancock County, Kentucky, United States. The airport opened in 2007 and it is owned by the Hancock County Airport Board.

== Facilities ==
Hancock County Airport covers an area of 105 acres (42 ha) at an elevation of 411 feet (125 m) above mean sea level. It has one asphalt paved runway designated 5/23 which measures 4,000 by 75 feet (1,219 x 23 m).

== See also ==
- List of airports in Kentucky
