= Bowman Field (Kentucky) =

Public airport in Louisville, Kentucky, United States

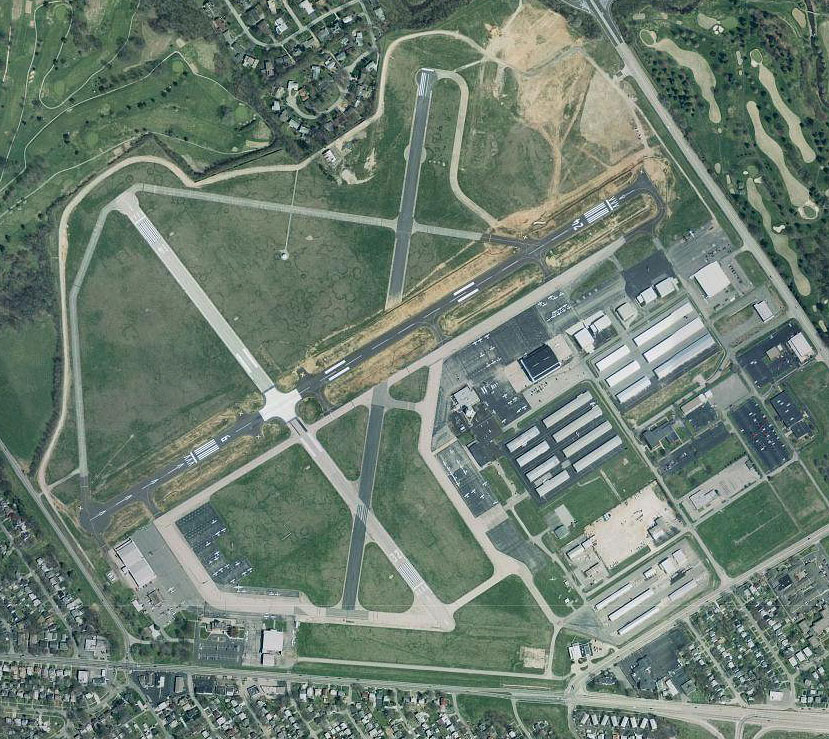
- IATA: LOU; ICAO: KLOU; FAA LID: LOU

Summary
- Airport type: Public
- Operator: Louisville Regional Airport Authority (LRAA)
- Serves: Louisville metropolitan area
- Opened: 1921; 105 years ago
- Elevation AMSL: 546 ft (166 m)
- Coordinates: 38°13′41″N 085°39′49″W
- Website: www.flylouisville.com/corporate/bowman-field

Map
- Location within Kentucky Location within the United States

Runways
Direction	Length		Surface
Direction	ft	m	Surface
6/24	4,326	1,328	Asphalt
15/33	3,579	1,091	Asphalt
- Source: Federal Aviation Administration

Bowman Field (IATA: LOU, ICAO: KLOU, FAA LID: LOU) is a public airport five miles (8.0 km) southeast of downtown Louisville, in Jefferson County, Kentucky. The airport covers 426 acres (172 ha) and has two runways. The Federal Aviation Administration (FAA) calls it a reliever airport for nearby Louisville Muhammad Ali International Airport.

== History ==
Established in 1919, Bowman Field is Kentucky's first commercial airport and is the oldest continually operating commercial airfield in North America. It was founded by Abram H. Bowman, who was drawn to aviation by the interest generated during World War I.

Bowman found an outlet for his enthusiasm after meeting and forming a brief partnership with Louisvillian Robert H. Gast, a pilot and World War I veteran of the Royal Flying Corps. Bowman leased a parcel of land east of Louisville from the U.S. Government in 1919 to operate the airfield, which opened in 1921.

The first business ventures began with the aerial photography business in 1921, and the 465th Pursuit Squadron (Reserve) began operations at Bowman Field in 1922.

Charles Lindbergh landed the Spirit of St. Louis at the airport in 1927, viewed by 10,000 spectators.

During the Great Depression, Louisvillians would often come to the Art Deco terminal building to watch airplanes depart and land as a form of inexpensive entertainment.

During the 1930s Eastern Air Lines and Trans World Airlines (TWA) carried passengers and mail in and out of Bowman Field. However, it could not be expanded due to its proximity to downtown. In 1947, the airlines moved to Standiford Field.

During World War II, Bowman Field was one of the nation's most important training bases and the nation's busiest airport. The facility became known as "Air Base City" when a bomber squadron moved in and more than 1,600 recruits underwent basic training in a three-month period. The United States Army Air Forces' school for flight surgeons, medical technicians, and flight nurses also called Bowman Field home.

Bowman Field was used in the James Bond film Goldfinger as the base for Pussy Galore's Flying Circus; principal photography of hangars, aircraft, etc., were done there in fall of 1963.

== Historic buildings ==
- Bowman Field Historic District
- U.S. National Register of Historic Places
- U.S. Historic district
- Location within Kentucky Location within the United States
- Location: Taylorsville Rd. and Peewee Reese Blvd., Louisville, Kentucky
- Area: 15 acres (6.1 ha)
- Built: 1929
- Architect: Wischmeyer & Arrasmith; Russell, J.F., & Co.
- Architectural style: Moderne
- NRHP reference No.: 88002616
- Added to NRHP: November 10, 1988

In 1988, three adjacent buildings at the airport were added to the National Register of Historic Places as the Bowman Field Historic District. They are the airport Administration Building (1929; 1936–37), the Curtiss Flying Service Hangar (1929), and the Army Air Corps Hangar (1931–32). Since many urban airports are located in industrial areas, this verdant setting is unusual and contributes to the ambience of the Bowman Field Historic District.

The buildings of the Bowman Field Historic District are related not only by proximity and historical function, but by their Art Deco/Art Moderne styling and use of masonry materials such as brick, stone and concrete.

The dominant landmark of Bowman Field is its terminal, known as the Administration Building, styled in aerodynamic Streamline Moderne, and designed by the firm of Wischmeyer and Arrasmith. As built in 1929, it was a fairly modest two-story structure with one-story wings, housing administrative and communications offices, weather station, and restaurant. During 1936 and 1937, it nearly tripled in size. This was accomplished by demolishing the east wing and retaining the west and central sections as west wings of the new building. The Administration Building faces an elliptical landscaped island surrounded by a driveway and paved parking area.

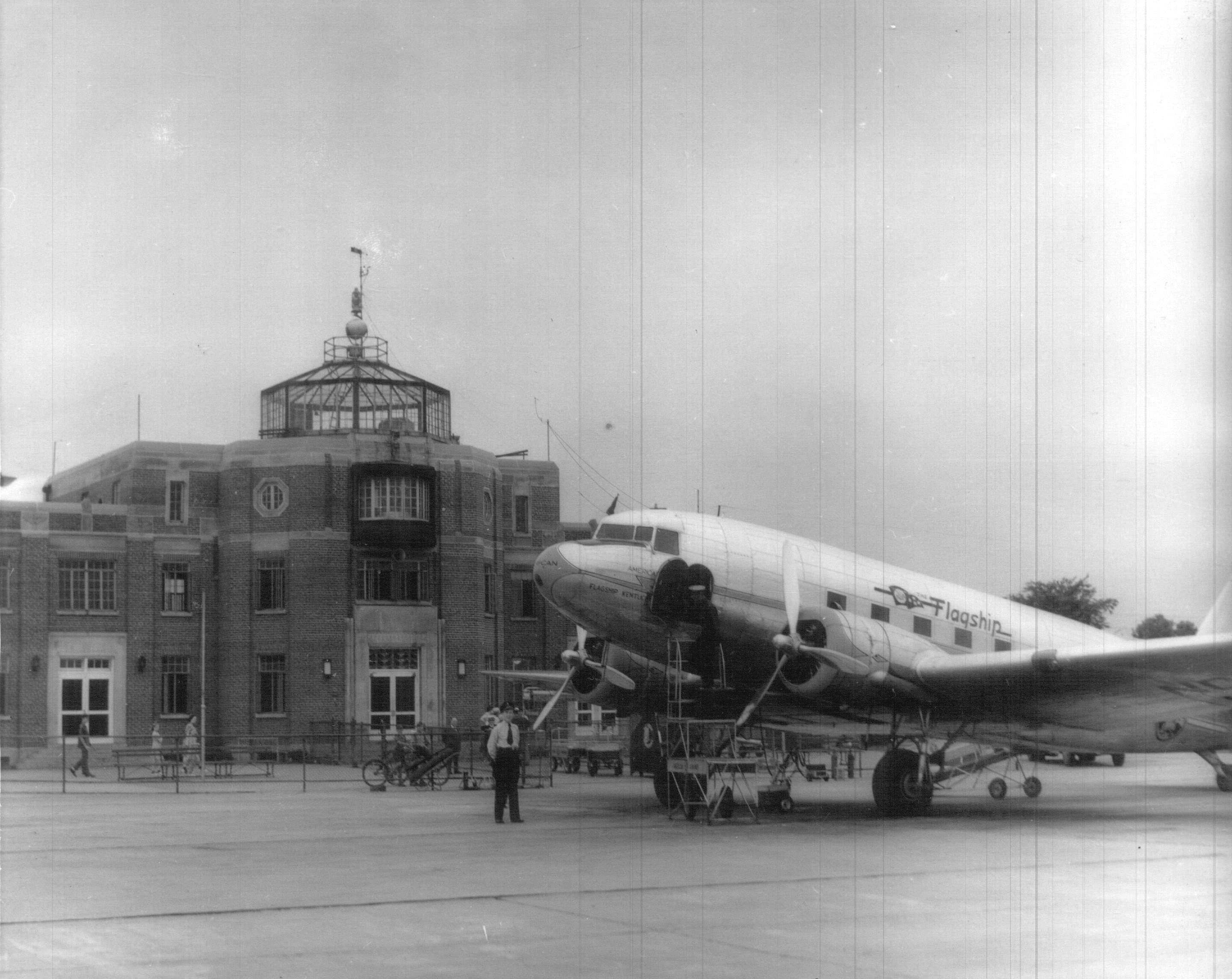
Bowman Field, Louisville c. 1940

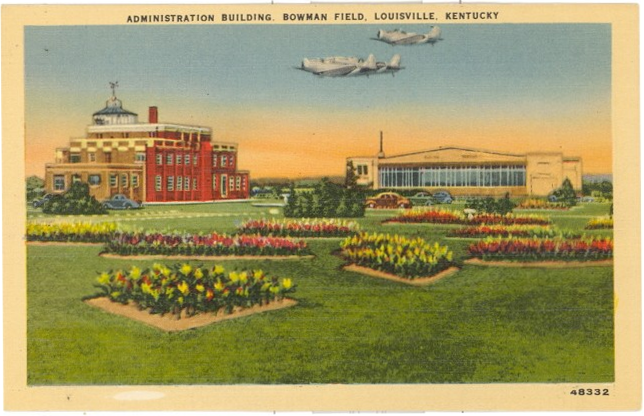
Postcard showing Bowman Field, Kentucky. Administration Building and Hangar c. 1939

== Current operations ==
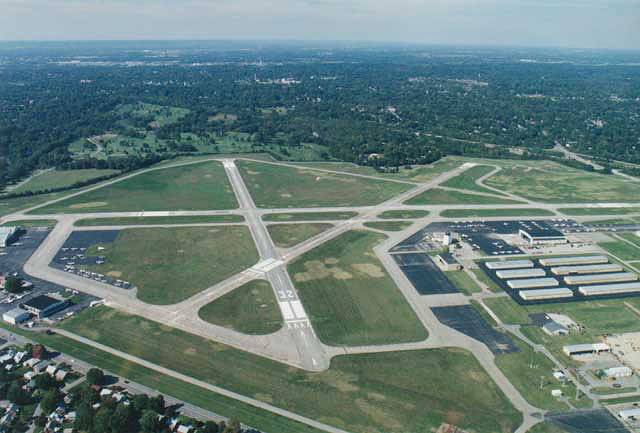
Bowman Field

Today Bowman Field is home to hundreds of privately owned aircraft as well as several commercial operations, including Aero Club of Louisville, Inc., and Louisville Executive Aviation. Several flight schools including Louisville Aviation, Kentucky Flight Training Center, Flight Club 502, and Cardinal Wings. operate there as well. The airport is home to multiple flight clubs.

In the year-long period ending June 20, 2022, the airport averaged 268 aircraft operations per day: 47% local general aviation, 45% transient general aviation 7% air taxi and <1% military. 235 aircraft are based at this airport: 195 single-engine, 29 multi-engine, 6 jet, and 5 helicopter.

Bowman Field is operated by the Louisville Regional Airport Authority, which also operates Louisville Muhammad Ali International Airport.

== See also ==
- List of airports in Kentucky
- History of Louisville, Kentucky
- Kentucky World War II Army Airfields
- I Troop Carrier Command
- Transportation in Louisville, Kentucky
- National Register of Historic Places listings in Jefferson County, Kentucky
