= Cynthiana, Kentucky =

- City
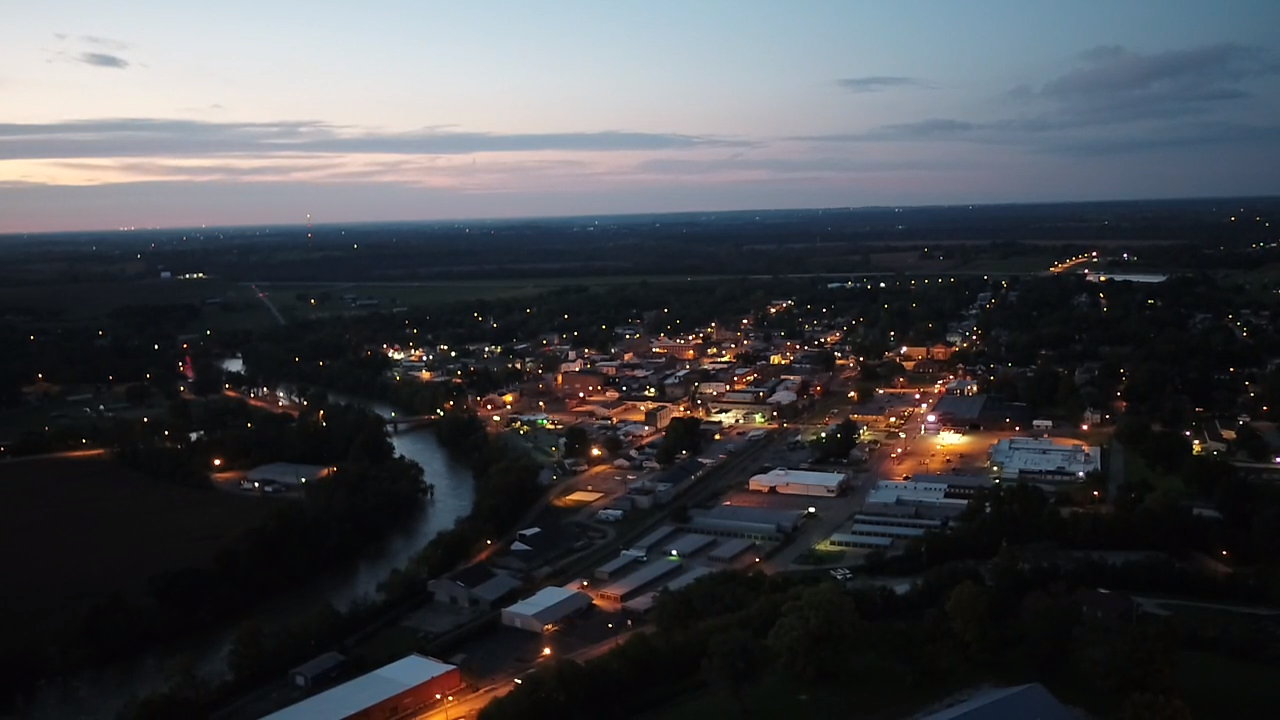
- City of Cynthiana at Sunset

- Location of Cynthiana in Harrison County, Kentucky.
- Coordinates: 38°23′10″N 84°17′58″W
- Country: United States
- State: Kentucky
- County: Harrison
- Established: 1793

Area
  - Total: 4.44 sq mi (11.50 km^{2})
  - Land: 4.39 sq mi (11.37 km^{2})
  - Water: 0.050 sq mi (0.13 km^{2})
- Elevation: 702 ft (214 m)

Population (2020)
  - Total: 6,333
  - Estimate (2022): 6,441
  - Density: 1,442.6/sq mi (556.99/km^{2})
- Time zone: UTC−5 (EST)
  - Summer (DST): UTC−4 (EDT)
- ZIP Code: 41031
- Area code: 859
- FIPS code: 21-19432
- GNIS feature ID: 2404172
- Website: www.cynthianaky.com

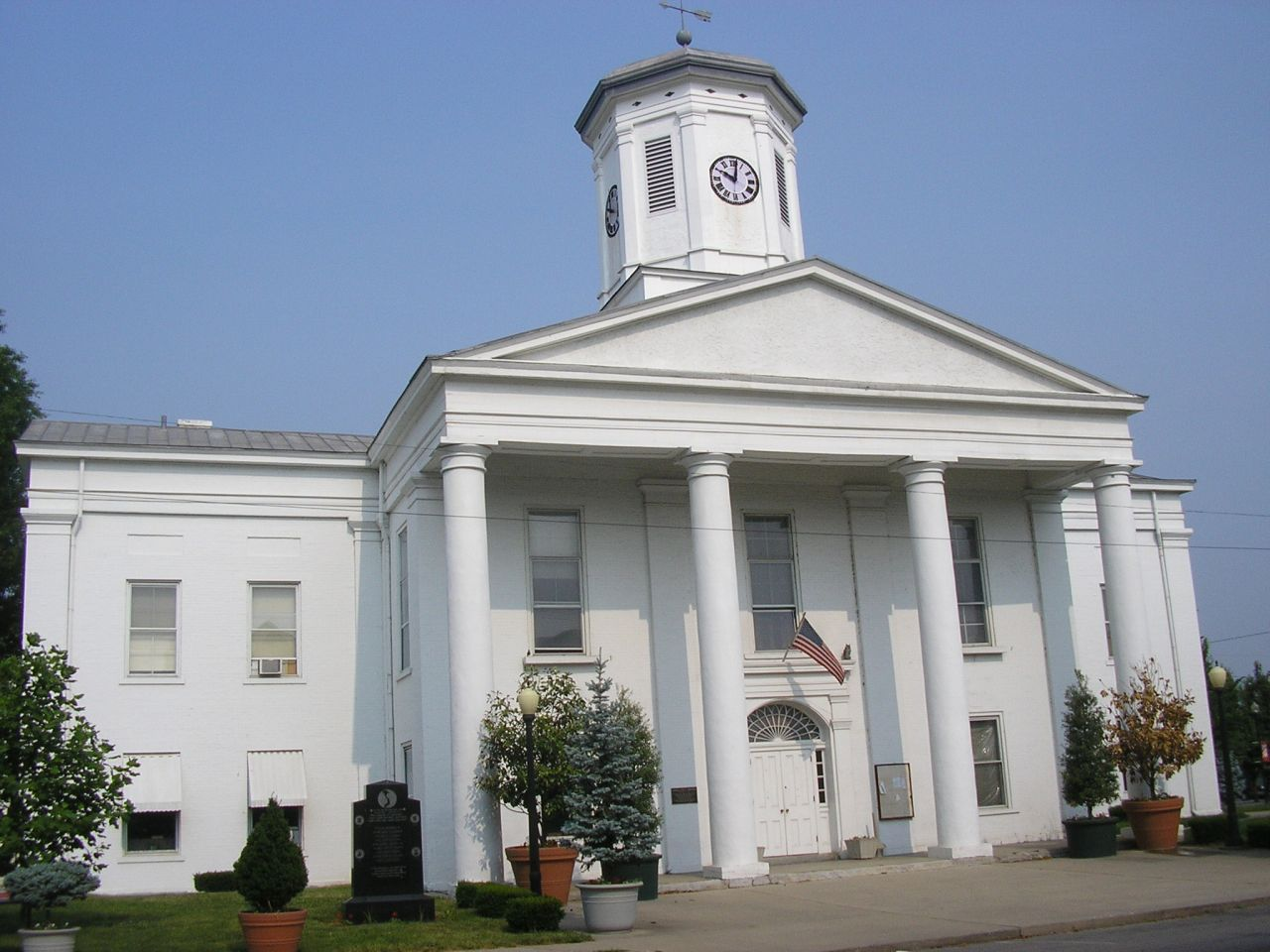
Harrison County Courthouse in Cynthiana

Cynthiana is a home rule-class city in Harrison County, Kentucky, in the United States. As of the 2020 census, Cynthiana had a population of 6,333. It is the seat of its county.

== History ==
The settlement developed on both sides of the South Fork of the Licking River. It was named after Cynthia and Anna Harrison, daughters of Robert Harrison, who had donated land to establish the town center. Harrison County, on the other hand, was named after Colonel Benjamin Harrison, an early settler in the area who had served as sheriff of Bourbon County.

Two Civil War battles were fought in Cynthiana. The first on July 17, 1862, was part of a cavalry raid into Kentucky (which stayed in the Union) by Confederate General John Hunt Morgan; the second, on June 11 and 12, 1864, resulted in Union defeat of Confederate forces during Morgan's last raid into the state.

On January 23, 1877, an LL chondrite meteorite fell in Cynthiana.

On March 2, 1997, the South Fork of the Licking River flooded, causing extensive damage in Cynthiana and neighboring communities.

In early March 2020, near the beginning of the COVID-19 pandemic in the United States, Cynthiana was reported to have the first case of the disease diagnosed in Kentucky. Four more cases soon followed, and by March 12, most businesses, schools and churches closed in an effort to prevent further spread.

== Geography ==
Cynthiana is located in southern Harrison County. U.S. Routes 27 and 62 pass through the city, passing west of the downtown area. US 27 leads north 56 miles (90 km) to Cincinnati and south 14 miles (23 km) to Paris, while US 62 leads northeast 46 miles (74 km) to Maysville and southwest 21 miles (34 km) to Georgetown. Lexington is 31 miles (50 km) to the southwest via US 27 or 29 miles (47 km) via Kentucky Route 353.

According to the United States Census Bureau, the city has a total area of 4.1 square miles (10.5 km^{2}), of which 4.0 square miles (10.4 km^{2}) are land and 0.04 square miles (0.1 km^{2}), or 1.09%, are water. The South Fork of the Licking River, a tributary of the Ohio River, flows south to north through the city, passing west of the downtown area.

=== Climate ===
The climate in this area is characterized by hot, humid summers and generally mild to cool winters. According to the Köppen Climate Classification system, Cynthiana has a humid subtropical climate, abbreviated "Cfa" on climate maps.

Climate data for Cynthiana, Kentucky (1991–2020 normals, extremes 1951–present)
Month	Jan	Feb	Mar	Apr	May	Jun	Jul	Aug	Sep	Oct	Nov	Dec	Year
Record high °F (°C)	74 (23)	79 (26)	88 (31)	91 (33)	94 (34)	102 (39)	105 (41)	106 (41)	103 (39)	95 (35)	83 (28)	77 (25)	106 (41)
Mean maximum °F (°C)	64.5 (18.1)	68.8 (20.4)	75.5 (24.2)	82.2 (27.9)	87.9 (31.1)	92.5 (33.6)	94.8 (34.9)	93.6 (34.2)	92.0 (33.3)	84.1 (28.9)	74.5 (23.6)	66.0 (18.9)	96.1 (35.6)
Mean daily maximum °F (°C)	41.2 (5.1)	45.9 (7.7)	55.3 (12.9)	67.2 (19.6)	75.8 (24.3)	83.5 (28.6)	86.7 (30.4)	86.2 (30.1)	80.4 (26.9)	69.1 (20.6)	55.8 (13.2)	45.7 (7.6)	66.1 (18.9)
Daily mean °F (°C)	32.0 (0.0)	35.4 (1.9)	43.7 (6.5)	54.3 (12.4)	64.1 (17.8)	72.1 (22.3)	76.0 (24.4)	74.6 (23.7)	67.9 (19.9)	56.2 (13.4)	44.3 (6.8)	36.5 (2.5)	54.8 (12.7)
Mean daily minimum °F (°C)	22.7 (−5.2)	24.9 (−3.9)	32.2 (0.1)	41.4 (5.2)	52.3 (11.3)	60.6 (15.9)	65.2 (18.4)	63.0 (17.2)	55.3 (12.9)	43.3 (6.3)	32.9 (0.5)	27.4 (−2.6)	43.4 (6.3)
Mean minimum °F (°C)	2.4 (−16.4)	8.5 (−13.1)	15.7 (−9.1)	26.7 (−2.9)	37.3 (2.9)	47.3 (8.5)	55.0 (12.8)	53.1 (11.7)	41.9 (5.5)	30.0 (−1.1)	19.8 (−6.8)	10.0 (−12.2)	−1.1 (−18.4)
Record low °F (°C)	−34 (−37)	−23 (−31)	−8 (−22)	13 (−11)	23 (−5)	33 (1)	44 (7)	36 (2)	31 (−1)	15 (−9)	−6 (−21)	−21 (−29)	−34 (−37)
Average precipitation inches (mm)	3.38 (86)	3.47 (88)	4.53 (115)	4.61 (117)	4.98 (126)	4.54 (115)	4.83 (123)	3.06 (78)	3.53 (90)	3.45 (88)	3.22 (82)	4.13 (105)	47.73 (1,212)
Average precipitation days (≥ 0.01 in)	9.3	7.9	10.3	11.2	11.5	10.5	9.2	7.9	6.9	7.1	8.8	9.5	110.1
Source: NOAA

== Transportation ==
=== U.S. Highways ===
- US 27 is known otherwise as Paris Pike (going south from Cynthiana), and Falmouth Road (going north from Cynthiana).
- US 62 is known otherwise as Leesburg Rd (going west from Cynthiana), and Oddville Pike (going east from Cynthiana).

=== Kentucky state highways ===
- KY 36 is also known locally as Williamstown Road (west of Cynthiana) and Millersburg Pike (east of Cynthiana).
- KY 32 is also known locally as Connersville Pike (southwest of Cynthiana) and Millersburg Pike (east of Cynthiana). KY 32 and KY 36 merge downtown and leave Cynthiana concurrently.
- KY 356 is also known as White Oak Road.

=== Air ===
Cynthiana-Harrison County Airport is a public airport located 2 miles south of Cynthiana. It consists of a 3,850 by 75 ft asphalt runway.

== Education ==
Cynthiana is served by the Harrison County School District with a total of seven public schools located within the county limits:

- High schools:
  - Harrison County High School
- Technical Schools
  - KY Tech Harrison Area Technology Center (ATC)
- Middle schools:
  - Harrison County Middle School
- Elementary schools:
  - Eastside Elementary
  - Westside Elementary
  - Northside Elementary
  - Southside Elementary

Cynthiana has one private school:

- St. Edward School (Pre-k-5)

Maysville Community and Technical College has an extended campus located in Cynthiana

- Maysville Community and Technical College: Licking Valley Campus

Cynthiana has a public library, the Cynthiana-Harrison Public Library.

== Demographics ==
Historical population
Census	Pop.	Note	%±
1800	78		—
1810	369		373.1%
1830	975		—
1840	798		−18.2%
1860	1,237		—
1870	1,771		43.2%
1880	2,101		18.6%
1890	3,016		43.6%
1900	3,257		8.0%
1910	3,603		10.6%
1920	3,857		7.0%
1930	4,386		13.7%
1940	4,840		10.4%
1950	4,847		0.1%
1960	5,641		16.4%
1970	6,356		12.7%
1980	5,881		−7.5%
1990	6,497		10.5%
2000	6,258		−3.7%
2010	6,402		2.3%
2020	6,333		−1.1%
2024 (est.)	6,557		3.5%
U.S. Decennial Census

=== 2020 census ===
As of the 2020 census, Cynthiana had a population of 6,333. The median age was 40.9 years. 22.8% of residents were under the age of 18 and 19.0% of residents were 65 years of age or older. For every 100 females there were 87.5 males, and for every 100 females age 18 and over there were 84.6 males age 18 and over.

99.3% of residents lived in urban areas, while 0.7% lived in rural areas.

There were 2,674 households in Cynthiana, of which 30.1% had children under the age of 18 living in them. Of all households, 34.7% were married-couple households, 20.1% were households with a male householder and no spouse or partner present, and 37.2% were households with a female householder and no spouse or partner present. About 36.2% of all households were made up of individuals and 15.2% had someone living alone who was 65 years of age or older.

There were 2,915 housing units, of which 8.3% were vacant. The homeowner vacancy rate was 2.8% and the rental vacancy rate was 6.7%.

Racial composition as of the 2020 census
Race	Number	Percent
White	5,657	89.3%
Black or African American	260	4.1%
American Indian and Alaska Native	10	0.2%
Asian	19	0.3%
Native Hawaiian and Other Pacific Islander	1	0.0%
Some other race	64	1.0%
Two or more races	322	5.1%
Hispanic or Latino (of any race)	156	2.5%

=== 2000 census ===
As of the census of 2000, there were 6,258 people, 2,692 households, and 1,639 families residing in the city. The population density was 1,873.6 inhabitants per square mile (723.4/km^{2}). There were 2,909 housing units at an average density of 870.9 per square mile (336.3/km^{2}). The racial makeup of the city was 92.43% White, 5.29% Black or African American, 0.16% Native American, 0.18% Asian, 0.05% Pacific Islander, 0.81% from other races, and 1.09% from two or more races. Hispanic or Latino of any race were 1.41% of the population.

There were 2,692 households, out of which 27.3% had children under the age of 18 living with them, 42.2% were married couples living together, 14.9% had a female householder with no husband present, and 39.1% were non-families. 36.0% of all households were made up of individuals, and 18.7% had someone living alone who was 65 years of age or older. The average household size was 2.24 and the average family size was 2.89.

In the city, the population was spread out, with 22.7% under the age of 18, 9.0% from 18 to 24, 26.3% from 25 to 44, 21.9% from 45 to 64, and 20.1% who were 65 years of age or older. The median age was 40 years. For every 100 females, there were 80.9 males. For every 100 females age 18 and over, there were 77.3 males.

The median income for a household in the city was $28,519, and the median income for a family was $34,691. Males had a median income of $27,704 versus $20,659 for females. The per capita income for the city was $15,227. About 13.3% of families and 16.1% of the population were below the poverty line, including 23.1% of those under age 18 and 11.7% of those age 65 or over.

== Economy ==
3M established a factory in Cynthiana in 1969. Post-it notes were developed in 1972 by Arthur Fry and Spencer Silver. Until patents expired in the late 1990s, the 3M factory in Cynthiana was the only production site of Post-it notes worldwide. Today, it still accounts for nearly all of the world's production.

== Media ==
=== Newspaper ===
The Cynthiana Democrat, owned by Paxton Media Group, formerly by Landmark Community Newspapers. Subscription-based weekly newspaper, printed every Thursday with in-home delivery. Has been in print since 1868. Also is available at www.cynthianademocrat.com

=== Radio ===
Call sign	Frequency	Format	Description / Notes
WCYN	1400 kHz	Classic hits	

== Notable people ==
- Celia Ammerman, model and star of America's Next Top Model (cycle 12)
- William Tell Coleman, founder of the Harmony Borax Works, Death Valley, California
- Richard Gruelle, painter and member of the Hoosier Group
- Joe B. Hall, University of Kentucky men's basketball coach 1972–85; coached Wildcats to 1978 national championship
- John O. Hodges (1831–1897), Kentucky state senator
- Robert Kirkman, comic book writer, co-creator of The Walking Dead
  - This is also where the original The Walking Dead comic characters Rick Grimes, Lori Grimes, Carl Grimes, Shane Walsh, and Morgan Jones lived prior to the events of the series
- Bill McKinney, jazz drummer and bandleader
- Tony Moore, comic book artist
- Lawrence Pressman, actor
- Anna Rankin Riggs (1835–1908), social reformer
- Pythias Russ, baseball player in the Negro leagues
- Walter E. Scott, namesake of Death Valley National Park's Scotty's Castle
- Betty Slade, IFBB professional bodybuilder
- Marcus A. Smith, United States Senator from Arizona
- Chris Snopek, Major League Baseball player
- Mac Swinford, federal judge
- Phil Wagner, retired American professional basketball player who spent one season (1968–69) in the American Basketball Association for the Indiana Pacers
- William A. Welch, civil engineer, environmentalist, and first general manager of the Palisades Interstate Park system
- Justin Wells, country and roots rock musician
- Caleb Walton West, last governor of Utah Territory
