= Fleming-Mason Airport =

- IATA: none; ICAO: KFGX; FAA LID: FGX

Summary
- Airport type: Public
- Owner: Fleming-Mason Airport Board
- Serves: Flemingsburg, Kentucky
- Location: Mason County
- Elevation AMSL: 913 ft (278 m)
- Coordinates: 38°32′30″N 083°44′36″W
- Interactive map of Fleming-Mason Airport

Runways
Direction	Length		Surface
Direction	ft	m	Surface
7/25	5,002	1,525	Asphalt

Statistics (2022)
- Aircraft operations (year ending 6/24/2022): 17,070
- Based aircraft: 22
- Source: Federal Aviation Administration

Fleming-Mason Airport (ICAO: KFGX, FAA LID: FGX) is a public use airport located in Mason County, Kentucky, United States. It is seven nautical miles (13 km) north of the central business district of Flemingsburg, a city in Fleming County. The airport is owned by the Fleming-Mason Airport Board.

Although most U.S. airports use the same three-letter location identifier for the FAA and IATA, this airport is assigned the identifier FGX by the FAA but has no designation from the IATA.

== Facilities and aircraft ==
Fleming-Mason Airport covers an area of 77 acres (31 ha) at an elevation of 913 feet (278 m) above mean sea level. It has one asphalt paved runway designated 7/25 which measures 5,002 by 100 feet (1,524 x 30 m).

For the 12-month period ending June 24, 2022, the airport had 17,070 aircraft operations, an average of 47 per day: 99% general aviation and 1% military. At that time there were 22 aircraft based at this airport: 20 single-engine, 1 helicopter, and 1 glider.

== See also ==
- List of airports in Kentucky
