= Morehead-Rowan County Airport =

- IATA: none; ICAO: none; FAA LID: I32

Summary
- Airport type: Public
- Owner: Morehead-Rowan County Airport Board
- Serves: Morehead, Kentucky
- Elevation AMSL: 845 ft / 258 m
- Coordinates: 38°08′00″N 83°32′17″W
- Website: mrcairport.org
- Interactive map of Morehead-Rowan County Airport

Runways
Direction	Length		Surface
Direction	ft	m	Surface
5/23	2,600	792	Asphalt

Statistics (2002)
- Aircraft operations: 5,300
- Source: FAA and airport web site

Morehead-Rowan County Airport (FAA LID: I32) was a public airport located six nautical miles (11 km) southwest of the central business district of Morehead, a city in Rowan County, Kentucky, United States. It was owned by the Morehead-Rowan County Airport Board.

In 2003, the airport board began construction on the Morehead-Rowan County Clyde A. Thomas Regional Airport (FAA LID: M97). The new airport, built to accommodate a longer runway, is located seven nautical miles (13 km) northwest of the city at 38°12′54″N 83°35′15″W. The new airport opened in 2007, which resulted in the closure of the old airport.

== Facilities and aircraft ==
Morehead-Rowan County Airport covered an area of 45 acres (18 ha). It contained one runway designated 5/23 with an asphalt surface measuring 2,600 x 75 ft (792 x 23 m). For the 12-month period ending August 28, 2002, the airport had 5,300 aircraft operations, an average of 14 per day: 92% general aviation, 4% air taxi and 4% military.
