= Murray-Calloway County Airport =

Murray-Calloway County Airport Kyle-Oakley Field
- IATA: CEY; ICAO: KCEY; FAA LID: CEY

Summary
- Airport type: Public
- Owner: Murray City-Calloway County Board
- Serves: Murray, Kentucky
- Elevation AMSL: 577 ft / 176 m
- Coordinates: 36°39′52″N 088°22′22″W
- Website: MurrayKyleOakley.com

Map
- Location of airport in Kentucky

Runways
Direction	Length		Surface
Direction	ft	m	Surface
5/23	6,202	1,890	Asphalt

Statistics (2016)
- Aircraft operations (year ending 10/10/2016): 15,938
- Based aircraft: 41
- Source: Federal Aviation Administration, Airport website

Murray-Calloway County Airport (IATA: CEY, ICAO: KCEY, FAA LID: CEY), also known as Kyle-Oakley Field, is a public use airport located 4.6 miles (7.4 km) northwest of the central business district of Murray, in Calloway County, Kentucky, United States. The airport opened in 1961. It is owned by the Murray City-Calloway County Board.

== History ==
The need for an airport for Murray and Calloway County was apparent to further the growth and progress of the community. The Murray Chamber of Commerce knew of the interest which the Murray Jaycees had in working to obtain an airport. In the spring of 1957 the Murray Chamber of Commerce approached the Jaycees to offer their assistance and cooperation if the Jaycees would undertake the airport project. The Jaycees endorsed the project and a committee was appointed after approval by the board of directors. A campaign was established to obtain approval from the State Department of Aeronautics, with local residents, businesses and interested parties writing letters and making phone calls. The result was an approval to continue with the project. The Jaycees held a radio auction for the purpose of raising funds for the airport project. With the success of the auction it was evident that there would be an airport for Murray and Calloway County. On Saturday, October 28, 1961, Kentucky Governor Bert T. Combs dedicated the airport in a ceremony attended by state and local officials as well as many local citizens.

In the mid-1980s, a commuter type service called Sunbird Airlines had scheduled flights to Nashville using single engine Piper PA-32 aircraft. They lasted about four years.

== Facilities and aircraft ==
The airport covers an area of 300 acres (120 ha) at an elevation of 577 feet (176 m) above mean sea level. It has one runway designated 5/23 with an asphalt surface measuring 6,202 by 100 feet (1,890 x 30 m).

For the 12-month period ending October 10, 2016, the airport had 15,938 aircraft operations, an average of 41 per day: 93% general aviation, 6% air taxi, and <1% military. At that time there were 41 aircraft based at this airport: 40 single-engine, and 1 multi-engine.

== See also ==
- List of airports in Kentucky
