= Madisonville Municipal Airport (Kentucky) =

- IATA: none; ICAO: none; FAA LID: 2I0

Summary
- Airport type: Public
- Owner: City of Madisonville
- Serves: Madisonville, Kentucky
- Elevation AMSL: 439 ft / 134 m
- Coordinates: 37°21′21″N 087°23′54″W
- Interactive map of Madisonville Municipal Airport

Runways
Direction	Length		Surface
Direction	ft	m	Surface
5/23	6,051	1,844	Asphalt

Statistics (2016)
- Aircraft operations (year ending 11/8/2016): 15,790
- Based aircraft: 29
- Source: Federal Aviation Administration

Madisonville Municipal Airport (FAA LID: 2I0) is a city-owned public-use airport located five nautical miles (9 km) northeast of the central business district of Madisonville, a city in Hopkins County, Kentucky, United States.

== Facilities and aircraft ==
Madisonville Municipal Airport covers an area of 215 acres (87 ha) at an elevation of 439 feet (134 m) above mean sea level. It has one asphalt paved runway designated 5/23 which measures 6,051 by 100 feet (1,844 x 30 m).

For the 12-month period ending November 8, 2016, the airport had 15,790 aircraft operations, an average of 43 per day: 97% general aviation, and 3% military. At that time there were 29 aircraft based at this airport: 24 single-engine, 1 multi-engine, 1 jet, and 3 helicopter.

== See also ==
- List of airports in Kentucky
