= Louisville Muhammad Ali International Airport =

Airport serving Louisville, Kentucky, United States

Louisville Muhammad Ali International Airport Standiford Field

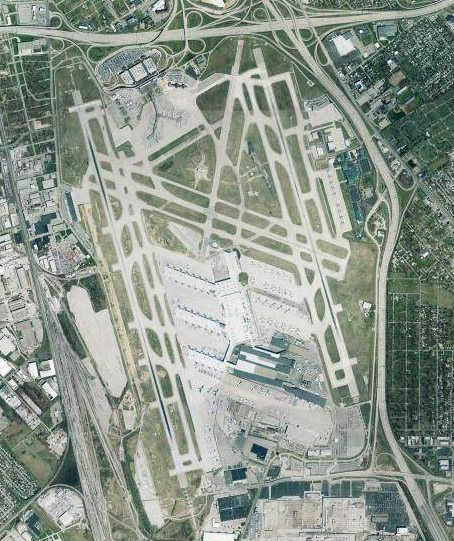
- IATA: SDF; ICAO: KSDF; FAA LID: SDF

Summary
- Airport type: Public
- Owner/Operator: Louisville Regional Airport Authority (LRAA)
- Serves: Louisville metropolitan area
- Opened: 1941; 85 years ago
- Hub for: UPS Airlines
- Elevation AMSL: 501 ft (153 m)
- Coordinates: 38°10′27″N 085°44′11″W
- Website: www.flylouisville.com

Maps
- FAA airport diagram
- Interactive map of Louisville Muhammad Ali International Airport; Standiford Field

Runways
Direction	Length		Surface
Direction	ft	m	Surface
17R/35L	11,887	3,623	Concrete
17L/35R	8,578	2,615	Concrete
11/29	7,251	2,210	Concrete

Statistics (2025)
- Aircraft operations: 189,006
- Passengers: 4,594,949 ▼4.59%
- Cargo handled (lbs.): 7,487,860,762
- Sources: Louisville Muhammad Ali International Airport, FAA

Louisville Muhammad Ali International Airport (IATA: SDF, ICAO: KSDF, FAA LID: SDF) – also known by its former official names as Standiford Field and Louisville International Airport – is a civil-military airport in Louisville, Kentucky. The airport was renamed after boxer and Louisville native Muhammad Ali in 2019, three years after his death. The airport covers 1,500 acres (610 ha) (Note: Federal Aviation Administration data shows the airport's land area is 1,200 acres (4.9 km^{2}).) and has three runways. Its IATA airport code, SDF, is based on the airport's former name, Standiford Field. Despite being called an international airport, it has no regularly scheduled international passenger flights, but is a port of entry, handling many UPS Airlines international cargo flights through the United Parcel Service's worldwide air hub, often referred to as UPS Worldport.

Over 4.8 million passengers passed through the airport in 2024, while nearly 6.6 billion pounds (3.3 million tons) of cargo passed through in 2024. It is also the third-busiest in the United States in terms of cargo traffic, and sixth-busiest for such in the world. The National Plan of Integrated Airport Systems for 2011–2015 categorized it as a "primary commercial service" airport, since it has over 10,000 passenger boardings (enplanements) per year. Federal Aviation Administration records show the airport had 2,402,517 revenue enplanements in 2024.

Because of UPS Airlines' operations, Louisville International Airport is the second-busiest cargo airport in the United States, and consequently, the western hemisphere, only falling short of the Ted Stevens Anchorage International Airport in Anchorage, Alaska. It is also the world's fourth-busiest airport by cargo traffic, behind Hong Kong, Shanghai Pudong, and Anchorage. The Kentucky Air National Guard's 123rd Airlift Wing operates Lockheed C-130 Hercules transport aircraft from the co-located Louisville Air National Guard Base.

== History ==
Standiford Field was built by the Army Corps of Engineers in 1941 on a parcel of land south of Louisville that was found not to have flooded during the Ohio River flood of 1937. It was named for Dr. Elisha David Standiford, a local businessman and politician, who was active in transportation issues and owned part of the land. The field remained under Army control until 1947, when it was turned over to the Louisville Air Board for commercial operations.

Until around 1947, Bowman Field was Louisville's main airport, which was too close to downtown to expand. For many years, passenger traffic went through the small brick Lee Terminal at Standiford Field. Today's more modern and much larger facilities were built in the 1980s. Most of the Lee Terminal was later torn down.

When Standiford Field was built by the U.S. Army Corps of Engineers in 1941, it had one 4,000-foot (1,200 m) runway. The airfield opened to the public in 1947 and all commercial service from Bowman Field moved to Standiford Field. American, Eastern, and TWA were the first airlines and had 1,300 passengers a week. The airlines used World War II barracks on the east side of the field until May 25, 1950, when a proper terminal opened. Lee Terminal could handle 150,000 passengers annually and included 6 new gates, which increased terminal space to 114,420 square feet (10,630 m^{2}). The three runways (1, 6 and 11) were all 5000 ft.

The April 1957 Official Airline Guide shows 45 weekday departures on Eastern Airlines, 19 American, 9 TWA, 4 Piedmont and 2 Ozark. Scheduled jet flights (Eastern 720s to Idlewild) began in January–February 1962.

In 1970, the terminal again expanded; the main lobby was extended and the 33,000-square-foot (3,100 m^{2}) Delta Air Lines concourse was built.

The 1980s brought plans for a new terminal, the Louisville Airport Improvement plan (LAIP). Construction of a new landside terminal designed by Bickel-Gibson Associated Architects Inc. began, costing $35 million with capacity for nearly 2 million passengers in 1985. Parallel runways, needed for expanded UPS operations, were part of the airport expansion. Most of the improvements were completed in the 1990s and the airport was totally renewed.

During the 1990s, Southwest Airlines began service to the airport which helped passenger boardings increase 97.3 percent. In 1995, the airport's name was changed from Standiford Field to Louisville International Airport. Around that time, SDF opened the two new parallel runways: runway 17L/35R, 8,578 feet (2,615 m) long and runway 17R/35L, 11,887 feet (3,623 m); both are 150 feet (46 m) wide. The Kentucky Air National Guard moved its base to SDF with 8 military aircraft; a new UPS air mail facility, new corporate hangars, a four-level parking garage and a new control tower were also added. A new FBO was added, run by Atlantic Aviation and managed by Michael Perry.

In 2005, a $26 million terminal renovation designed by Gensler Inc. was completed. As of 2024, the airport is in the midst of a major renovation project called SDF Next, which includes more than $1 billion in planned enhancements to the Jerry E. Abramson Terminal, work on the baggage claim, updates to security and lighting, and changes to the rental car counters, among other improvements.

On January 16, 2019, the Louisville Regional Airport Authority voted to change the name of the airport to Louisville Muhammad Ali International Airport in honor of the boxer and Louisville native Muhammad Ali. On June 6, 2019, the airport unveiled its new logo, featuring "Ali's silhouette, arms up and victorious, against the background of a butterfly".

== Facilities ==
=== Terminal ===
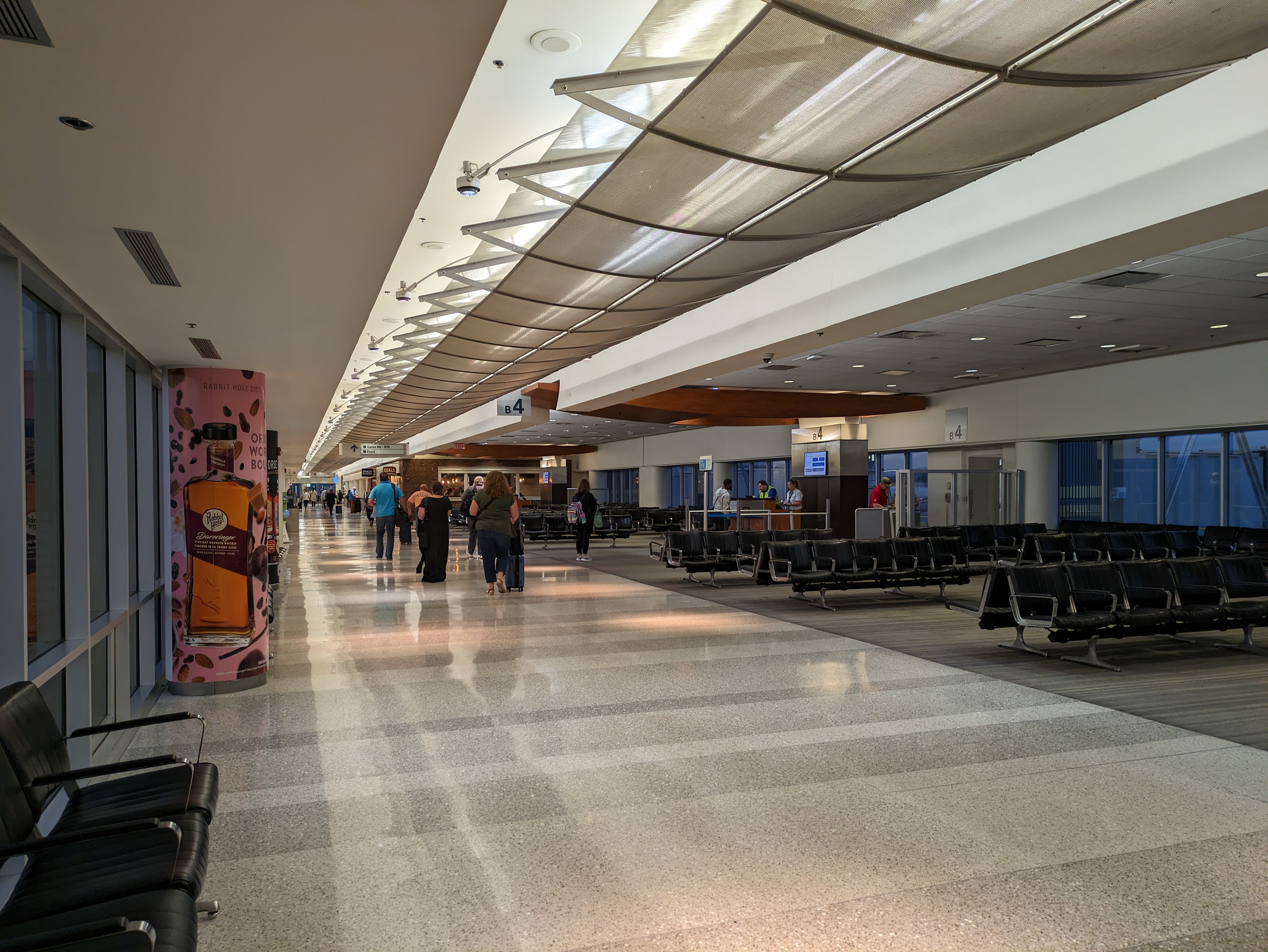
Concourse B

The Jerry E. Abramson Terminal, named after former Lieutenant Governor and five-term Louisville mayor Jerry Abramson, is the airport's main commercial terminal. It consists of two floors with ground transportation and baggage claim services on the first floor and ticketing, passenger drop off, and concourse access on the second floor. There are 24 gates in the two concourses. These concourses are connected by a rotunda and connector that contains a unified security checkpoint located in the main section of the terminal.

- Concourse A contains 12 gates.
- Concourse B contains 12 gates.

=== Runways ===
Louisville Muhammad Ali International Airport has three concrete runways, two of which are parallel with one crosswind. The westernmost runway (17R/35L) is the longest of the three at 11,887 feet (3,623 m) and was extended in 2007 to accommodate larger aircraft flying nonstop to destinations as far away as the Pacific Rim and Asia. The other two runways, 17L/35R, measures 8,578 feet (2,615 m) and 11/29 measures 7,251 feet (2,210 m)

=== Worldport ===
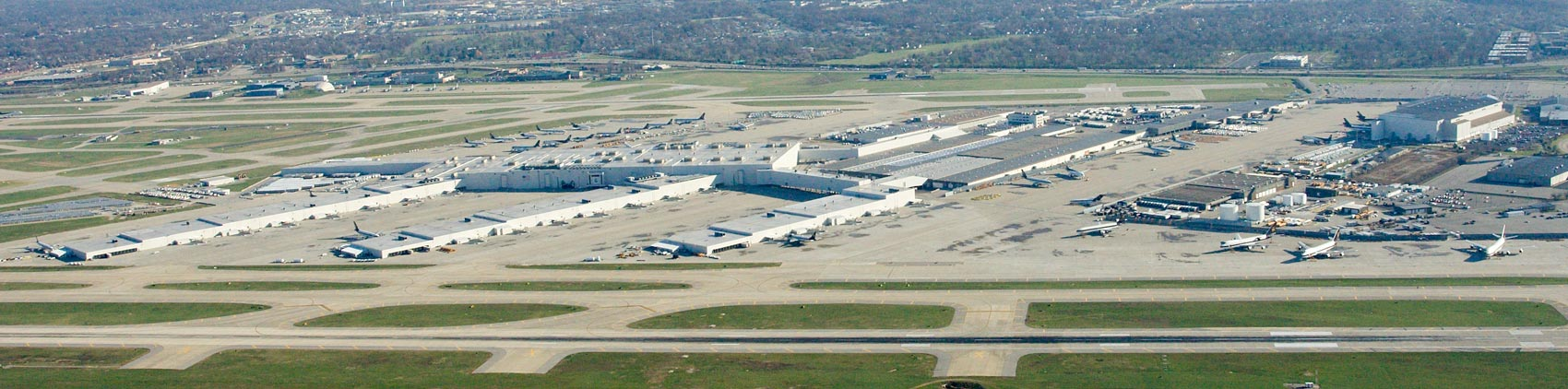
UPS Worldport at Louisville International Airport in 2004

Worldport is the worldwide air hub for UPS (United Parcel Service) located at Louisville Muhammad Ali International Airport. Because of UPS, Louisville is the fourth-busiest cargo airport in the world, and the second busiest in the United States. Although UPS has had a hub at Louisville since 1980, the name 'Worldport' was not used officially by the company until 2002, after a $1 billion, five-year expansion. Previously, the project was named Hub 2000. The facility is currently 5.2 million sq ft (48 ha; 80 football fields) in size and capable of handling 115 packages per second, or 416,000 per hour. With more than 20,000 employees, UPS is one of the largest employers in both the city of Louisville and the state of Kentucky as a whole. The facility, which serves all of the company's major international and domestic hubs, mainly handles express and international packages and letters.

A 1,000,000-square-foot (93,000 m^{2}) expansion was completed in spring 2006 to integrate heavy freight into the UPS system. The expansion was prefaced by the purchase of Menlo Worldwide Forwarding, formerly Emery Worldwide. The new facility, designated Worldport Freight Facility (HWP), went online in April 2006 and was the first of the company's regional hubs to begin integrating the Menlo volume into the system. Operations at Menlo's facility in Dayton, Ohio, ended in June 2006.

In May 2006, UPS announced that for the third time in seven years it would significantly expand its Worldport hub, with a second investment of $1 billion. The second expansion was completed in April 2010, with the facility now measuring 5,200,000 square feet (480,000 m^{2}), with a perimeter of 7.2 miles (11.6 km). The plan was for more than 1,000,000 square feet (93,000 m^{2}) to be added to its existing facility, with another 334,500 square feet (31,080 m^{2}) of space to be renovated with new technology and equipment. Worldport sorting capacity was to expand from 300,000 packages per hour to 416,000 packages per hour. Additionally, several ramps at the Louisville Muhammad Ali International Airport were to be built or altered bringing a total increase of just over 3,000,000 square feet (280,000 m^{2}).

== Airlines and destinations ==
=== Passenger ===
Airlines	Destinations
Air Canada Express	Seasonal: Toronto–Pearson (begins April 28, 2027)
Allegiant Air	Fort Lauderdale, Gulf Shores, Orlando/Sanford, Punta Gorda (FL), St. Petersburg/Clearwater; Seasonal: Charleston (SC), Destin/Fort Walton Beach, Myrtle Beach, Sarasota, Savannah
American Airlines	Charlotte, Dallas/Fort Worth, Miami
American Eagle	Boston, Charlotte, Chicago–O'Hare, Dallas/Fort Worth, Philadelphia, Washington–National; Seasonal: Miami
Breeze Airways	Charleston (SC), Fort Myers, New Orleans, Raleigh/Durham, San Francisco; Seasonal: Hartford, Los Angeles, Pittsburgh, Tampa
Delta Air Lines	Atlanta
Delta Connection	Boston, Detroit, Minneapolis/St. Paul, New York–LaGuardia; Seasonal: Orlando
Southwest Airlines	Baltimore, Chicago–Midway, Dallas–Love, Denver, Houston–Hobby, Las Vegas, Nashville, Orlando, Phoenix–Sky Harbor, Tampa; Seasonal: Fort Lauderdale, Fort Myers, Miami (begins March 13, 2027)
United Airlines	Denver
United Express	Chicago–O'Hare, Denver, Houston–Intercontinental, Newark, Washington–Dulles

=== Cargo ===
Airlines	Destinations
Air Cargo Carriers	Beckley, Charleston (WV), Danville (IL), Decatur, Madison, Milwaukee, Roanoke, South Bend, Traverse City (MI), Warsaw (IN)
FedEx Express	Memphis
IFL Group	Thief River Falls
UPS Airlines	Albany (GA), Albany (NY), Albuquerque, Anchorage, Atlanta, Austin, Baltimore, Bangor, Billings, Birmingham (AL), Boise, Boston, Buffalo, Burbank, Calgary, Cedar Rapids/Iowa City, Charlotte, Chicago–O'Hare, Chicago/Rockford, Cleveland, Cologne/Bonn, Columbia (SC), Columbus–Rickenbacker, Dallas/Fort Worth, Denver, Des Moines, Detroit, Dubai–International, Dublin, East Midlands, El Paso, Fargo, Fort Lauderdale, Fort Myers, Fort Wayne, Fresno, Gary/Chicago, Greensboro (NC), Greenville/Spartanburg, Guadalajara, Hamilton (ON), Harrisburg, Hartford, Hong Kong, Honolulu, Houston–Intercontinental, Huntsville, Jackson (MS), Jacksonville (FL), Kansas City, Knoxville, Lafayette, Lansing, Las Vegas, Laredo, Little Rock, London–Stansted, Long Beach, Los Angeles, Lubbock, Manchester (NH), McAllen, Memphis, Mexico City-AIFA, Miami, Milwaukee, Minneapolis/Saint Paul, Monterrey, Montréal–Mirabel, Newark, Newburgh, New Orleans, New York–JFK, Norfolk, Oakland, Oklahoma City, Omaha, Ontario, Orange County (CA), Orlando, Pensacola, Peoria, Philadelphia, Phoenix–Sky Harbor, Pittsburgh, Portland (OR), Providence, Raleigh/Durham, Reno/Tahoe, Richmond, Roanoke, Sacramento–Mather, St. Louis, Salt Lake City, San Antonio, San Bernardino, San Diego, San Jose (CA), San Juan, Savannah, Seattle–Boeing, Seoul–Incheon, Shanghai–Pudong, Shreveport, Sioux Falls, South Bend, Spokane, Springfield/Branson, Syracuse, Tampa, Tokyo–Narita, Toronto–Pearson, Tulsa, Vancouver, Washington–Dulles, Winnipeg, West Palm Beach, Wichita

== Statistics ==
=== Top destinations ===
Busiest domestic routes from SDF (January 2025 – December 2025)
Rank	City	Passengers	Carriers
1	Atlanta, Georgia	330,710	Delta
2	Dallas/Fort Worth, Texas	188,060	American
3	Chicago–O'Hare, Illinois	154,040	American, United
4	Charlotte, North Carolina	150,780	American
5	Denver, Colorado	116,060	Southwest, United
6	Orlando, Florida	107,030	Delta, Southwest, Spirit
7	Chicago–Midway, Illinois	92,400	Southwest
8	Baltimore, Maryland	88,730	Southwest
9	New York–LaGuardia, New York	75,850	Delta
10	Detroit, Michigan	69,060	Delta

=== Airline market share ===
Largest airlines at SDF (January 2025 – December 2025)
Rank	Airline	Passengers	Share
1	Southwest Airlines	1,086,000	24.42%
2	Republic Airways	630,000	14.15%
3	Delta Air Lines	619,000	13.90%
4	American Airlines	541,000	12.16%
5	PSA Airlines	236,000	5.30%
6	Others	1,338,000	30.07%

=== Annual traffic and cargo ===
SDF Airport annual passengers and cargo 2004–present
Year	Passengers	Total cargo (lb)	Year	Passengers	Total cargo (lb)	Year	Passengers	Total cargo (lb)
2004	3,438,138	3,834,924,928	2014	3,355,811	5,055,706,407	2024	4,816,084	6,598,231,796
2005	3,730,678	4,001,736,489	2015	3,359,472	5,182,270,067	2025	4,594,949	7,487,860,762
2006	3,663,041	4,372,563,774	2016	3,346,545	5,372,687,454	2026		
2007	3,819,154	4,584,225,636	2017	3,474,340	5,737,961,328	2027		
2008	3,682,420	4,353,419,373	2018	3,866,057	5,782,767,038	2028		
2009	3,263,812	4,297,972,629	2019	4,239,064	6,151,136,493	2029		
2010	3,349,162	4,777,478,457	2020	1,636,931	6,431,419,629	2030		
2011	3,398,864	4,824,644,236	2021	3,176,874	6,729,100,374	2031		
2012	3,365,115	4,780,426,911	2022	3,888,332	6,761,880,348	2032		
2013	3,404,080	4,885,617,722	2023	4,659,648	6,013,812,675	2033		

== Accidents and incidents ==
- September 28, 1953: Resort Airlines Flight 1081, a Curtiss C-46 Commando leased from the United States Air Force, crashed on landing at Louisville-Standiford Field when the aircraft ballooned slightly during the flare-out on runway 24, causing a loss of control when it climbed to 300 feet (90 m) and stalled. Out of the 41 on board, 22 passengers and three crew were killed. Failure of the left elevator during landing was the cause.
- March 10, 1957: Eastern Air Lines Flight 181, a Martin 4-0-4 crash-landed at SDF on runway 11. All 34 passengers and crew aboard survived with just one serious injury. The pilot's improper landing approach caused an excessive sink rate, causing a portion of the left wing to separate inboard of the #1 engine and left the aircraft partially inverted. The plane was damaged beyond repair.
- September 8, 1970: Delta Air Lines Flight 439, a McDonnell Douglas DC-9 inbound from Chicago–O'Hare attempting an instrument landing at night at SDF landed 156 feet (48 m) short of the threshold of runway 29, hitting sloping terrain, becoming airborne, bouncing and then skidding down the runway for nearly 1,500 yards (1,370 m) before coming to a stop. All five crew and 89 passengers survived. The aircraft was substantially damaged, but repaired and later put back into service. Pilot error was the cause.
- June 7, 2005: UPS Airlines Flight 6971, a McDonnell Douglas MD-11 with four occupants aboard, suffered a nose gear collapse after touchdown on runway 17L. The accident was due to improper handling of the aircraft by the pilot at the controls after the main landing gear touched down and the pilot-in-command's inadequate supervision during landing. The aircraft sustained substantial damage, but was repaired and returned to service.
- November 4, 2025: UPS Airlines Flight 2976, a McDonnell Douglas MD-11 crashed during takeoff from runway 17R. The preliminary cause of the crash was the detachment of the left engine from the aircraft and its cascading effects on the other two engines. This caused loss of lift, with the aircraft then rolling from imbalance and crashing into buildings near the end of runway 17R. This subsequently caused a large fire and 15 deaths, including all three crew members.

== See also ==
- Bowman Field – Public airport in Louisville, Kentucky, United States
- Kentucky World War II Army Airfields
- List of busiest airports by cargo traffic
- Transportation in Louisville, Kentucky
- UPS Airlines – Cargo airline based in the United States
