= Madisonville Municipal Airport (Texas) =

- IATA: none; ICAO: none; FAA LID: 51R

Summary
- Airport type: Public
- Owner: City of Madisonville
- Serves: Madisonville, Texas
- Elevation AMSL: 287 ft / 87 m
- Coordinates: 30°54′46″N 095°57′07″W

Map
- Location of airport in Texas

Runways
Direction	Length		Surface
Direction	ft	m	Surface
18/36	3,202	976	Asphalt

Statistics (2011)
- Aircraft operations: 600
- Based aircraft: 2
- Source: Federal Aviation Administration

Madisonville Municipal Airport (FAA LID: 51R) is a city-owned, public-use airport located three nautical miles (6 km) southwest of the central business district of Madisonville, a city in Madison County, Texas, United States.

== Facilities and aircraft ==
Madisonville Municipal Airport covers an area of 40 acres (16 ha) at an elevation of 287 feet (87 m) above mean sea level. It has one runway designated 18/36 with an asphalt surface measuring 3,202 by 50 feet (976 x 15 m).

For the 12-month period ending July 31, 2011, the airport had 600 general aviation aircraft operations, an average of 50 per month. At that time there were two single-engine aircraft based at this airport.

== See also ==
- List of airports in Texas
