= Stuart Powell Field =

- IATA: none; ICAO: KDVK; FAA LID: DVK

Summary
- Airport type: Public
- Owner: City of Danville & Boyle County
- Serves: Danville, Kentucky
- Elevation AMSL: 1,022 ft / 312 m
- Coordinates: 37°34′40″N 084°46′11″W
- Interactive map of Stuart Powell Field

Runways
Direction	Length		Surface
Direction	ft	m	Surface
12/30	5,000	1,524	Asphalt
1/19	1,971	601	Asphalt

Statistics (2018)
- Aircraft operations: 21,470
- Based aircraft: 55
- Source: Federal Aviation Administration

Stuart Powell Field (ICAO: KDVK, FAA LID: DVK) is a public-use airport located 3 nautical miles (5.6 km; 3.5 mi) south of the central business district of Danville, a city in Boyle County, Kentucky, United States. It is owned by the City of Danville and Boyle County.

Although most U.S. airports use the same three-letter location identifier for the FAA and IATA, this airport is assigned DVK by the FAA but has no designation from the IATA.

== Facilities and aircraft ==
Stuart Powell Field covers an area of 170 acres (69 ha) at an elevation of 1,022 feet (312 m) above mean sea level. It has two asphalt paved runways: 12/30 is 5,000 feet (1,524 m) by 75 feet (23 m) and 1/19 is 1,971 feet (601 m) by 75 feet (23 m).

For the 12-month period ending May 8, 2018, the airport had 21,470 aircraft operations, an average of 59 per day: 80% general aviation, 17% air taxi and 2% military. As of May 8, 2018, 55 aircraft were based at this airport: 45 single-engine, 3 multi-engine, 4 jet, and 3 helicopter.

== See also ==
- List of airports in Kentucky
