= 2027 in Kentucky =

- Decades: 2000s; 2010s; 2020s
- See also: History of Kentucky; Historical outline of Kentucky; List of years in Kentucky; 2027 in the United States

The following is a list of events of the year 2027 in Kentucky.

== Events ==
=== Planned or predicted ===
- May 1 - 2027 Kentucky Derby
- November 2 -
  - 2027 Kentucky gubernatorial election
  - Other elections in Kentucky
