= Outline of Kentucky =

Overview of and topical guide to Kentucky

The flag of Kentucky

The seal of Kentucky

The location of the Commonwealth of Kentucky in the United States of America

The following outline is provided as an overview of and topical guide to the United States Commonwealth of Kentucky:

Kentucky – state located in the upper south United States of America, nicknamed the "Bluegrass State", due to the presence of bluegrass in many of the pastures throughout the state. As classified by the United States Census Bureau, Kentucky is a Southern state, in the East South Central region. Kentucky is the 37th largest state in terms of total area, the 36th largest in land area, and ranks 26th in population. Originally a part of Virginia, in 1792 it became the 15th state to join the Union. Kentucky is designated a commonwealth by the Kentucky Constitution and is formally known as the "Commonwealth of Kentucky."

== General reference ==
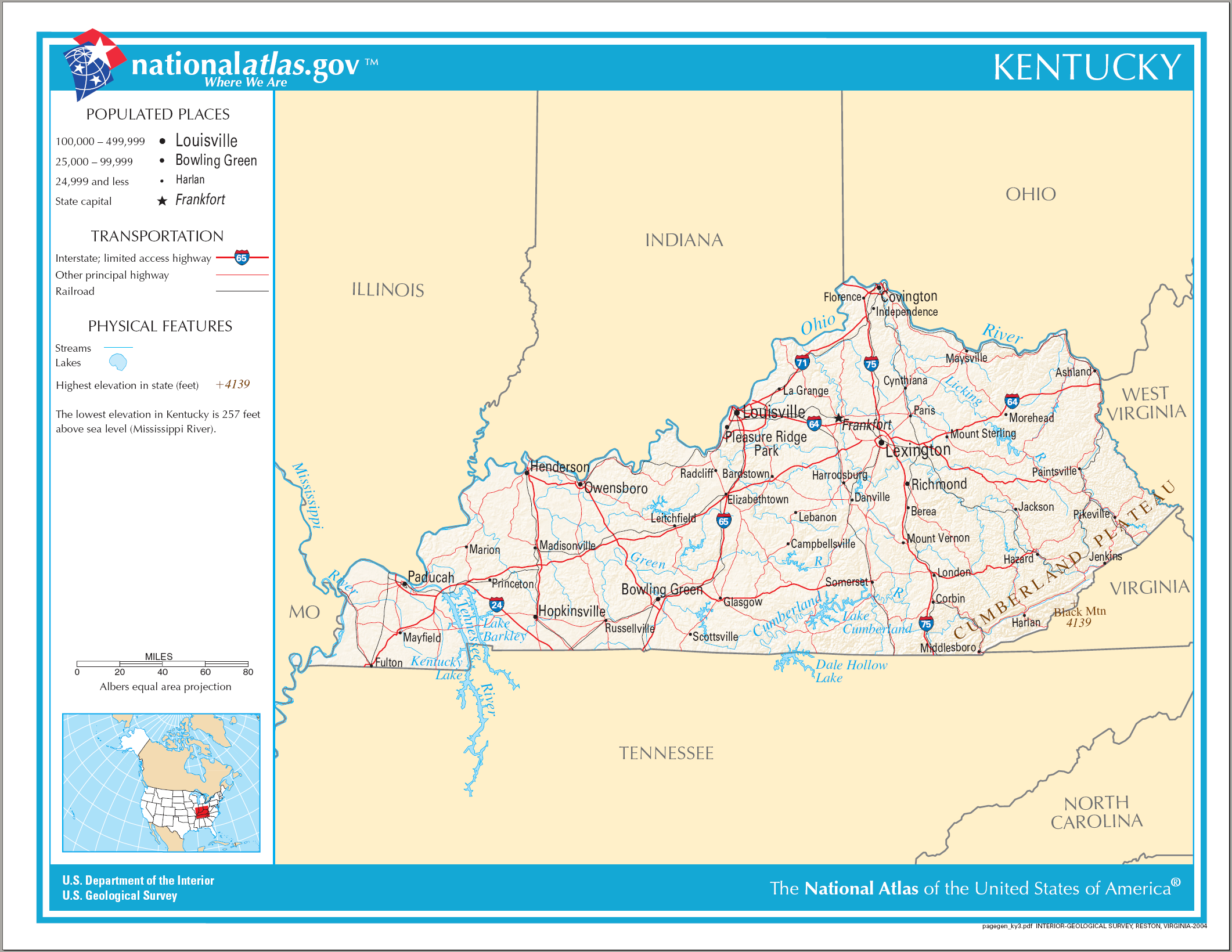
An enlargeable map of the Commonwealth of Kentucky

- Kentucky is: a U.S. state, a federal state of the United States of America
- Names
  - Common name: Kentucky
    - Pronunciation: /kɪnˈtʌki/
  - Official name: Commonwealth of Kentucky
  - Abbreviations and name codes
    - Postal symbol: KY
    - ISO 3166-2 code: US-KY
    - Internet second-level domain: .ky.us
  - Nicknames
    - Bluegrass State (currently used on license plates)
    - Corn-cracker State (reported in 1881)
    - Dark and Bloody Ground (an allusion to battles between the Creek, Shawnee, Chickasaw, and Cherokee tribes)
    - Hemp State
    - Tobacco State
- Adjectival: Kentucky
- Demonym: Kentuckian
- State symbols of Kentucky
  - Flag of the Commonwealth of Kentucky
  - Seal of the Commonwealth of Kentucky

== Geography and Climatology of Kentucky ==
Geography of Kentucky

Geology of Kentucky

- Location: Southeastern United States (Upper South) in the trans-Appalachian region south of the Ohio River of the continent of North America
- Boundaries: Ohio River (N), Big Sandy River and Tug Fork (NE), Mississippi River (W), Walker's Line, Tennessee River and Munsell Line (S), Cumberland Mountains (SE)

=== Regions of Kentucky ===
- Bluegrass region including the inner and outer bluegrass regions
- Cumberland Plateau including the Eastern Kentucky Coalfield
- Pennyroyal Plateau or Mississippi Plateau including Western Coal Fields
- Jackson Purchase

=== Natural geographic features of Kentucky ===
- Lakes of Kentucky
- Rivers of Kentucky
- Mountains in Kentucky
- Pottsville Escarpment
- List of waterfalls in Kentucky
- Cumberland and Pound Gaps: passes through the Cumberland Mountains
- Falls of the Ohio, steep rapids on the Ohio River at Louisville (see McAlpine Locks and Dam).
- Salt licks
  - Bullitt's Lick
  - Mann's Lick
  - Big Bone Lick
  - Blue Licks

=== Places in Kentucky ===
- Historic places in Kentucky
  - National Historic Landmarks in Kentucky
  - National Register of Historic Places listings in Kentucky
    - Bridges on the National Register of Historic Places in Kentucky
- National Natural Landmarks in Kentucky
- National parks in Kentucky
  - Mammoth Cave National Park
- State parks in Kentucky

=== Environment of Kentucky ===
- (Temperate deciduous forest biome)
- Climate of Kentucky
  - Climate change in Kentucky
- Greenhouse gas emissions in Kentucky
- Protected areas in Kentucky
  - State forests of Kentucky
- Superfund sites in Kentucky

== Administrative divisions of Kentucky ==
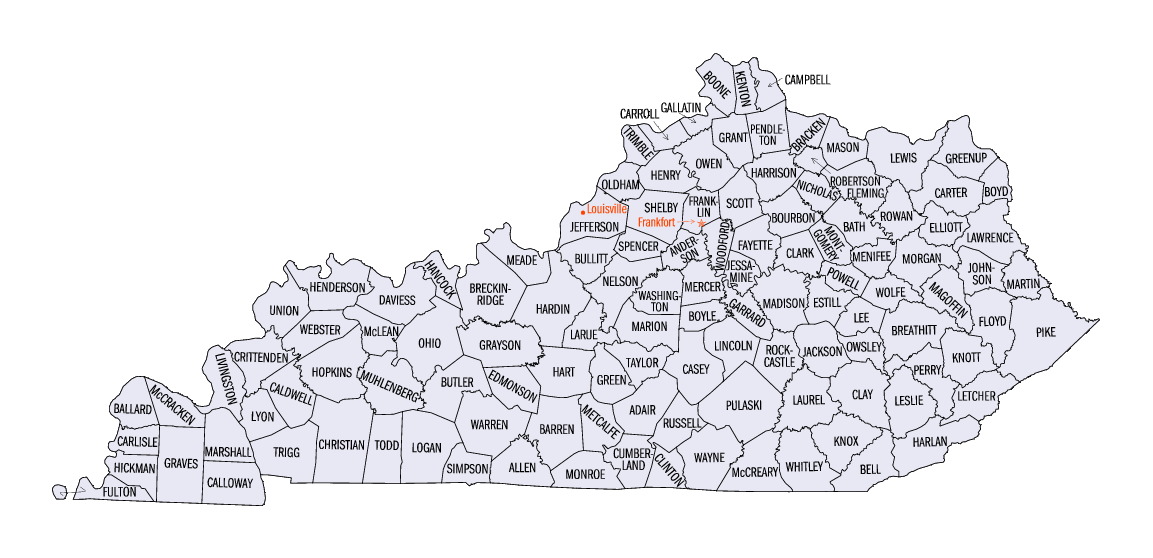
An enlargeable map of the 120 counties of the commonwealth of Kentucky

- Counties of the Commonwealth of Kentucky
  - (former) Beckham County
  - City-county municipalities
    - Lexington-Fayette
    - Louisville-Jefferson
  - Cities in Kentucky
    - State capital of Kentucky:
    - City nicknames in Kentucky

== Demographics of Kentucky ==
Demographics of Kentucky

Kentucky statistical areas

- Population of Kentucky: 4,505,836 (2020 U.S. Census)

== Government and politics of Kentucky ==
Government of Kentucky

Politics of Kentucky

- Constitution of Kentucky
- Form of government: U.S. state government
- Kentucky's congressional delegations
- Kentucky State Capitol
- Elections in Kentucky
  - Kentucky state board of elections
  - Electoral reform in Kentucky
- Political party strength in Kentucky

=== Executive branch of the government of Kentucky ===
The executive branch of Kentucky has 7 elected officers, 11 departments with appointed secretaries and numerous subordinate agencies.

- Governor of Kentucky
  - Lieutenant Governor of Kentucky
- Secretary of State of Kentucky
- Kentucky State Treasurer
- Kentucky Auditor of Public Accounts
- Kentucky Commissioner of Agriculture
- Attorney General of Kentucky
- 11 state cabinets, each headed by a secretary
  - Kentucky Transportation Cabinet
  - Kentucky Justice and Public Safety Cabinet
  - Kentucky Energy and Environment Cabinet
  - Kentucky General Government Cabinet
  - Kentucky Cabinet for Economic Development
  - Kentucky Finance and Administration Cabinet
  - Kentucky Tourism, Arts, and Heritage Cabinet
  - Kentucky Education and Labor Cabinet
  - Kentucky Cabinet for Health and Family Services
  - Kentucky Personnel Cabinet
  - Kentucky Public Protection Cabinet

=== Legislative branch of the government of Kentucky ===
- Kentucky General Assembly (bicameral)
  - Upper house: Kentucky Senate
  - Lower house: Kentucky House of Representatives

=== Judicial branch of the government of Kentucky ===
Courts of Kentucky

- Supreme Court of Kentucky
  - Chief Justice of the Commonwealth
- Kentucky Court of Appeals
- Kentucky Circuit Courts
- Kentucky District Courts
- Kentucky Specialty Courts
- Kentucky Department of Public Advocacy
- Kentucky Judicial Conduct Commission

=== Federal courts in Kentucky ===
- United States District Court for the Eastern District of Kentucky
- United States District Court for the Western District of Kentucky
- United States Court of Appeals for the Sixth Circuit

=== Law and order in Kentucky ===
Law of Kentucky

- Crime in Kentucky
- Law enforcement in Kentucky
  - Attorney General of Kentucky
  - U.S. Marshalls Service for eastern and western districts of Kentucky
  - Law enforcement agencies of Kentucky
    - Kentucky State Police
    - Louisville Metro Police Department

==== Laws by type ====
- Cannabis in Kentucky
- Capital punishment in Kentucky
  - Individuals executed in Kentucky
- Gun laws in Kentucky
- Abortion in Kentucky

=== Military in Kentucky ===
- US military bases in Kentucky
- Kentucky Air National Guard
- Kentucky Army National Guard

== History of Kentucky ==
- History of Kentucky
- Kentucky#History
- Timeline of Kentucky history

=== Historical societies in Kentucky ===
- The Filson Historical Society
- Kentucky Historical Society

=== History of Kentucky, by period ===
- Prehistory of Kentucky, ~9500BCE–1650
  - Indigenous peoples
- Discovery by Europeans, 1673
- French colony of Louisiane, 1682–1763
  - French and Indian War, 1754–1763
  - Treaty of Paris of 1763
- English Colony of Virginia, 1609–1774
- English Province of Quebec, 1774-1776 (see Quebec Act)
- British Indian Reserve, 1763–1768
  - Royal Proclamation of 1763
  - Treaty of Fort Stanwix (1768)
- Daniel Boone, frontiersman in Kentucky 1767–~1799
- Transylvania Colony, 1775–1778
  - Harrod's Town, Louisville, Lexington
  - Wilderness Road
- American Revolutionary War, April 19, 1775 – September 3, 1783
  - United States Declaration of Independence, July 4, 1776
  - Siege of Boonesborough, September 7–18, 1778
  - Battle of Blue Licks, 1782
  - Treaty of Paris, September 3, 1783
- Commonwealth of Virginia, 1776–1792
  - Cherokee–American wars, 1776–1794
  - Fincastle County, Virginia, 1772–1776
  - Kentucky County, Virginia, 1777–1780
  - District of Kentucky (Fayette, Jefferson, Lincoln, and successor counties), 1780–1792
- Commonwealth of Kentucky becomes 15th State admitted to the United States of America on June 1, 1792
  - Abraham Lincoln born in 1809 in Kentucky
  - Henry Clay, politician 1800–1850
  - War of 1812, June 18, 1812 – March 23, 1815
    - Treaty of Ghent, December 24, 1814
  - American Civil War, April 12, 1861 – May 13, 1865
    - Kentucky in the American Civil War
      - Border state, 1861–1865
      - Confederate Kentucky Campaign
      - Battle of Perryville, October 8, 1862
      - Morgan's Raid, June 11 – July 26, 1863

=== History of Kentucky, by region ===
- by city
  - History of Lexington, Kentucky
  - History of Louisville, Kentucky
    - Louisville in the American Civil War
  - Frankfort, Kentucky#History
- by county
  - Kentucky County, Virginia
  - Jefferson County, Kentucky#History
  - Lincoln County, Kentucky#History
  - Fayette County, Kentucky#History

=== History of Kentucky, by subject ===
- List of battles fought in Kentucky
- History of slavery in Kentucky
- List of Kentucky women in the civil rights era
- Paleontology in Kentucky
- Historical sports teams
  - Louisville Breckenridges (football)
  - Louisville Colonels (football)
  - Kentucky Colonels (basketball)
  - Kentucky Bourbons (softball)

== Culture of Kentucky ==
Culture of Kentucky

- Kentucky Colonel civic award
- Cuisine of Kentucky
  - Southern pit barbecue
- Museums in Kentucky
- Religion in Kentucky
  - Cathedrals in Kentucky
  - Roman Catholic Archdiocese of Louisville
  - Episcopal Diocese of Kentucky
  - Kentucky Baptist Convention
- Scouting in Kentucky

=== Arts and letters in Kentucky ===
- Music of Kentucky
  - Bluegrass music
- Theater in Kentucky
- Kentucky literature

=== Sports in Kentucky ===
Sports in Kentucky

- Professional sports
  - Kentucky Derby
    - Churchill Downs
  - Racing Louisville FC
  - Louisville City FC
- College sports
  - Kentucky Wildcats men's basketball
  - Louisville Cardinals men's basketball
- Kentucky High School Athletic Association

== Economy and infrastructure of Kentucky ==
Economy of Kentucky

- Agriculture in Kentucky
- Kentucky bourbon
- Media in Kentucky
  - Newspapers in Kentucky
    - Courier Journal, Louisville
  - Radio stations in Kentucky
  - Television stations in Kentucky
- Energy in Kentucky
  - Coal mining in Kentucky
  - Power stations in Kentucky
  - Solar power in Kentucky
  - Wind power in Kentucky
- Health care in Kentucky
  - Hospitals in Kentucky
- Transportation in Kentucky
  - Airports in Kentucky
    - Cincinnati/Northern Kentucky International Airport
    - Louisville International Airport
  - Railroads in Kentucky
  - Shipping ports in Kentucky
    - Port of Huntington-Tristate (includes Ashland, Kentucky),
    - Port of Cincinnati-Northern Kentucky
    - Port of Louisville-Southern Indiana
  - Roads in Kentucky
    - U.S. Highways in Kentucky
    - Interstate Highways in Kentucky
    - State highways in Kentucky

== List of people from Kentucky ==
- List of people from the Louisville metropolitan area

== Education in Kentucky ==
Education in Kentucky

- Schools in Kentucky
  - School districts in Kentucky
    - High schools in Kentucky
  - Colleges and universities in Kentucky
    - University of Kentucky
    - Kentucky State University
    - University of Louisville
  - HBCUs in Kentucky
    - Kentucky State University
    - Simmons College of Kentucky

== See also ==
- Topic overview:
  - Kentucky
  - Index of Kentucky-related articles
