= 2024 in Kentucky =

- Decades: 2000s; 2010s; 2020s
- See also: History of Kentucky; Historical outline of Kentucky; List of years in Kentucky; 2024 in the United States

The following is a list of events of the year 2024 in Kentucky.

== Incumbents ==
=== State government ===
- Governor: Andy Beshear (D)

== Events ==
- January 10 — Florida-based grocer Publix opens their first Kentucky store in Louisville on Terra Crossing.
- May 4 – 2024 Kentucky Derby: The 150th edition of the Kentucky Derby is held, with American thoroughbred racehorse Mystik Dan winning in a photo finish.
- May 21 –
  - 2024 Kentucky Democratic presidential primary.
  - 2024 Kentucky Republican presidential primary.
- May 17 – Police in Louisville arrest American golfer Scottie Scheffler, who was travelling to the 2024 PGA Championship, for assault of a police officer, criminal mischief, reckless driving, and disregarding traffic signals.
- May 27 – Tornado outbreak of May 25–27, 2024: The death toll from a tornado outbreak in the U.S. states of Texas, Kentucky, Oklahoma, and Arkansas on Saturday and Sunday increases to 21.
- July 6 – Kentucky birthday party shooting: Four people are killed and three others are injured in a mass shooting in Florence. The perpetrator later commits suicide.
- September 7 – Interstate 75 Kentucky shooting: Several people are injured in a mass shooting near Interstate 75 in Laurel County.
- September 19 – Letcher County Judge Kevin Mullins is shot and killed in his chambers. Letcher County Sheriff Mickey Stines is charged with his murder.
- November 12 – Two people are killed and 12 others are injured in an explosion at a food coloring factory in Louisville.

== See also ==
- 2024 in the United States
