= 2024 Oregon Democratic presidential primary =

- May 21, 2024

78 delegates (66 pledged, 12 unpledged) to the Democratic National Convention

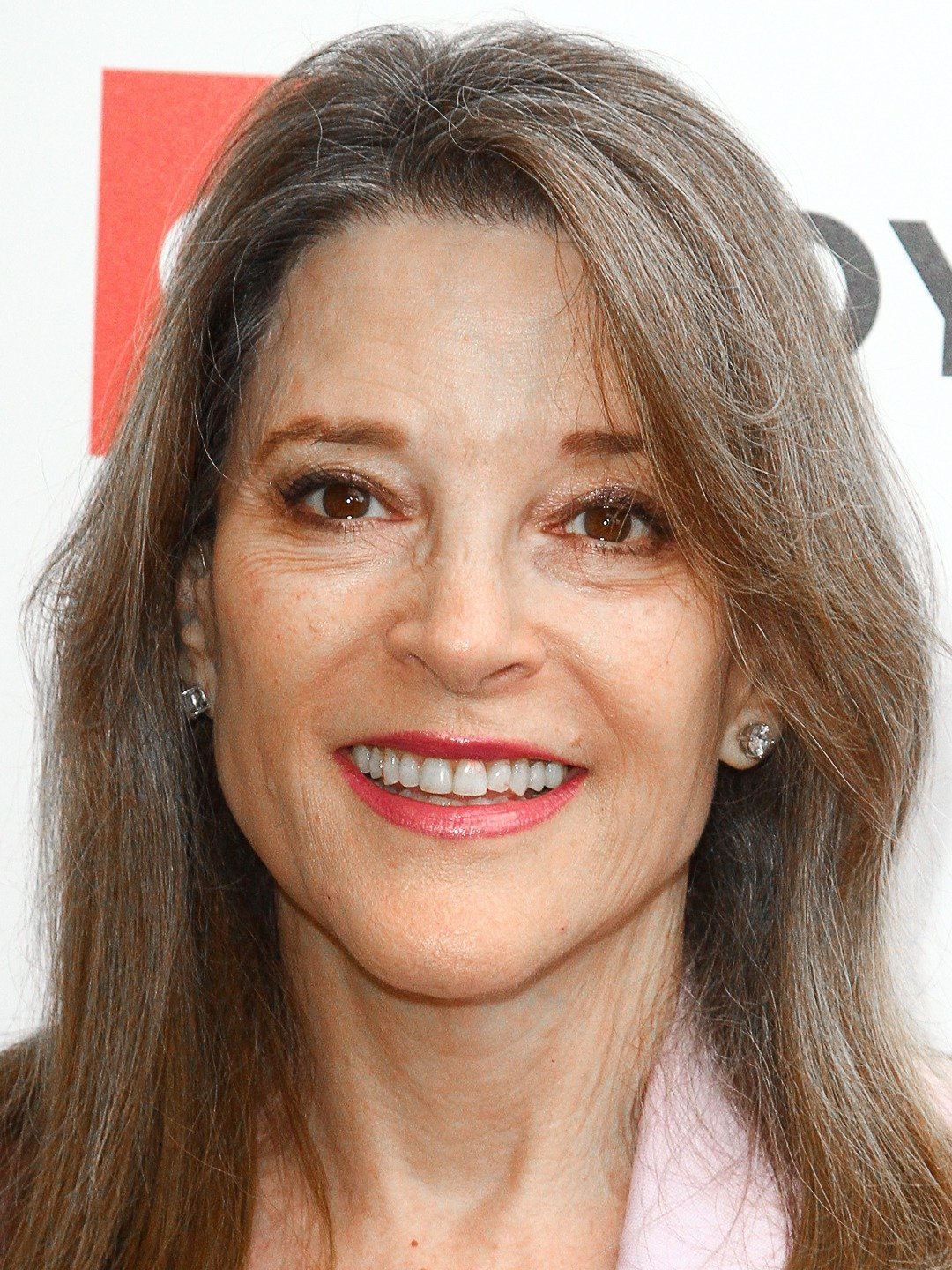
Candidate	Joe Biden	Marianne Williamson
Home state	Delaware	Washington, D.C.
Delegate count	66	0
Popular vote	397,702	33,603
Percentage	87.1%	7.4%
County results
Biden
60–70%
70–80%
80–90%
>90%

The 2024 Oregon Democratic presidential primary was held on May 21, 2024, as part of the Democratic Party primaries for the 2024 presidential election, alongside Kentucky's primary and two days before Idaho's caucuses. 66 delegates to the Democratic National Convention were allocated, with 12 additional unpledged delegates. Incumbent President Joe Biden won the primary with almost 90% ahead of the only other candidate Marianne Williamson.

== Candidates ==
Incumbent President Joe Biden announced on April 25, 2023, his bid for a second term. He faced a primary challenge from author, progressive activist, and 2020 presidential candidate Marianne Williamson.

== Endorsements ==
Joe Biden

U.S. Senators

- Jeff Merkley, U.S. Senator from Oregon (2009–present)

== Results ==
Oregon Democratic primary, May 21, 2024
Candidate	Votes	%	Delegates
Joe Biden (incumbent)	397,702	87.13	66
Marianne Williamson	33,603	7.36	0
Write-in votes	25,135	5.51	—
Total	456,440	100%	66

== See also ==
- 2024 Oregon Republican presidential primary
- 2024 Democratic Party presidential primaries
- 2024 United States presidential election
- 2024 United States presidential election in Oregon
- 2024 United States elections
