= 2023 in Kentucky =

- Decades: 2000s; 2010s; 2020s
- See also: History of Kentucky; Historical outline of Kentucky; List of years in Kentucky; 2023 in the United States

The following is a list of events of the year 2023 in Kentucky, United States.

== Incumbents ==
=== State government ===
- Governor: Andy Beshear (D)

== Events ==
- March 30 – 2023 Fort Campbell mid-air collision: Two Sikorsky HH-60 Pave Hawk helicopters collide over Fort Campbell, killing all nine people on board.
- April 10 – 2023 Louisville shooting: Five people are killed and eight others are injured in a mass shooting at a bank in Louisville. The perpetrator, who livestreamed the attack on Instagram, is also killed.
- May 6 – 2023 Kentucky Derby: Mage wins the Kentucky Derby.
- November 7 – 2023 Kentucky gubernatorial election: Governor Andy Beshear is re-elected, defeating Attorney General Daniel Cameron.

== See also ==
- 2023 in the United States
