= Climate change in Kentucky =

Climate change in the US state of Kentucky

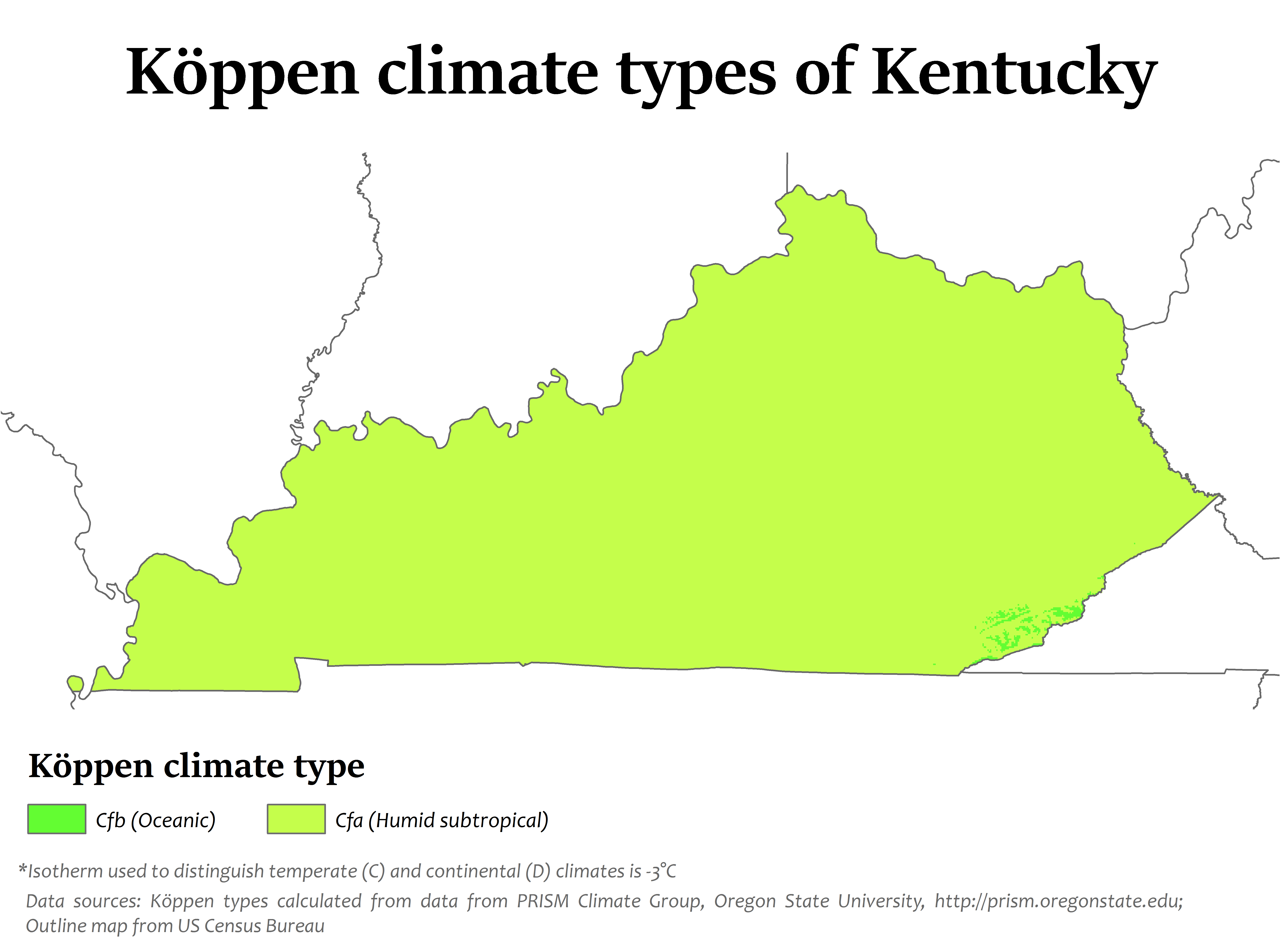
Köppen climate types in Kentucky, showing that the state is almost entirely humid subtropical.

Climate change in Kentucky encompasses the effects of climate change, attributed to man-made increases in atmospheric carbon dioxide, in the U.S. state of Kentucky.

The United States Environmental Protection Agency (EPA) reports: "Kentucky's climate is changing. Although the average temperature did not change much during the 20th century, most of the commonwealth has warmed in the last 20 years. Average annual rainfall is increasing, and a rising percentage of that rain is falling on the four wettest days of the year. In the coming decades, the changing climate is likely to reduce crop yields and threaten some aquatic ecosystems. Floods may be more frequent, and droughts may be longer, which would increase the difficulty of meeting the competing demands for water in the Ohio, Tennessee, and Cumberland rivers". In May 2019, The Kansas City Star noted that climate change is suspected in the increasing number of tornadoes in the region, "the band of states in the central United States ... that each spring are ravaged by hundreds of tornadoes — is not disappearing. But it seems to be expanding", resulting in a higher frequency of tornadoes in states including Kentucky.

== Precipitation and water resources ==
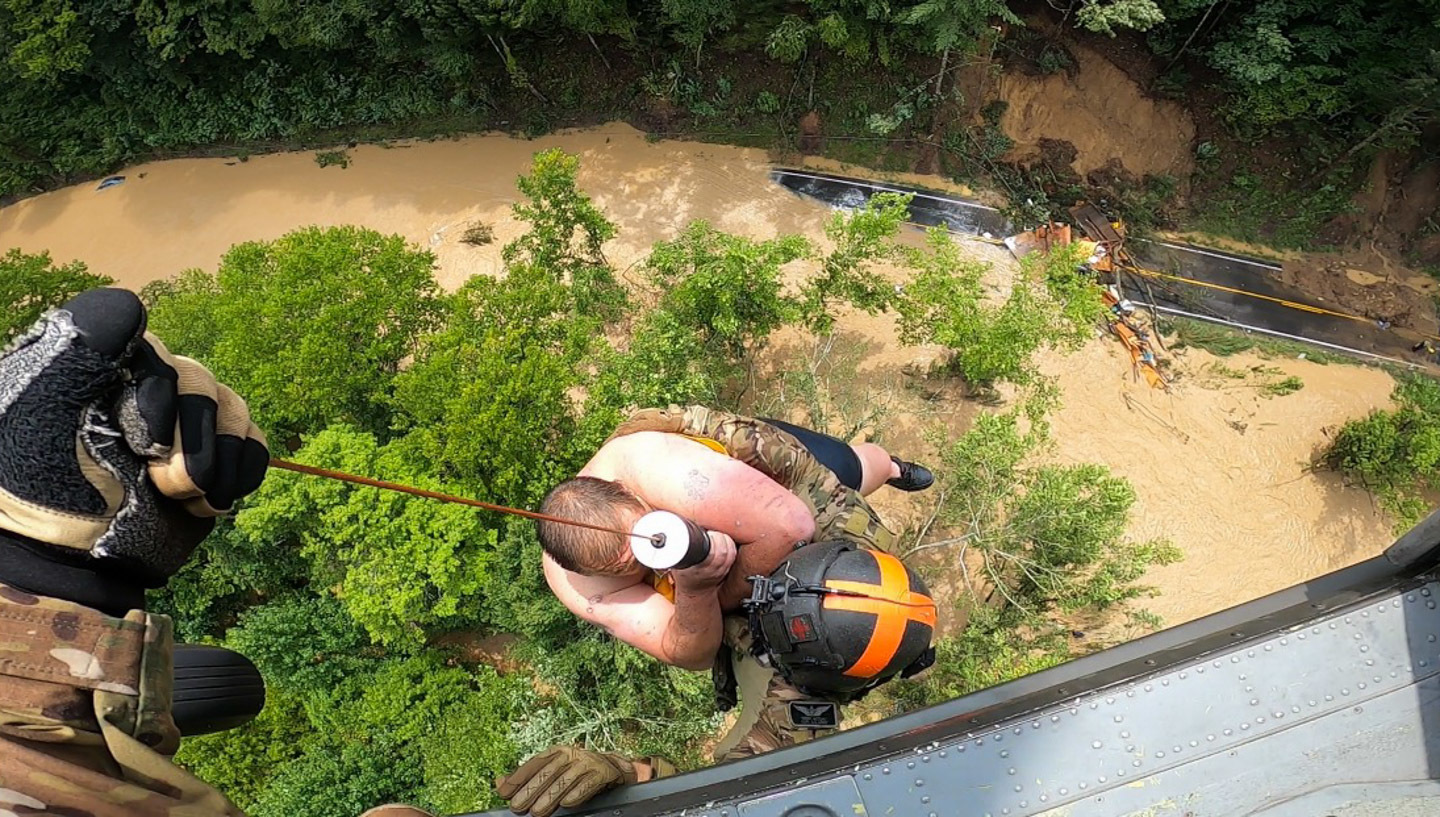
An airlift during the July 2022 Kentucky floods

By 2020, heavy rainfall events had "increased by 20 percent since the early 20th century in eastern Kentucky."

According to the EPA "Annual precipitation in Kentucky has increased approximately 5 percent since the first half of the 20th century. But rising temperatures increase evaporation, which dries the soil and decreases the amount of rain that runs off into rivers. Although rainfall during spring is likely to increase during the next 40 to 50 years, the total amount of water running off into rivers or recharging ground water each year is likely to decline 2.5 to 5 percent, as increased evaporation offsets the greater rainfall. Droughts are likely to be more severe, because periods without rain will be longer and very hot days will be more frequent".

== Flooding, navigation, and hydroelectric power ==
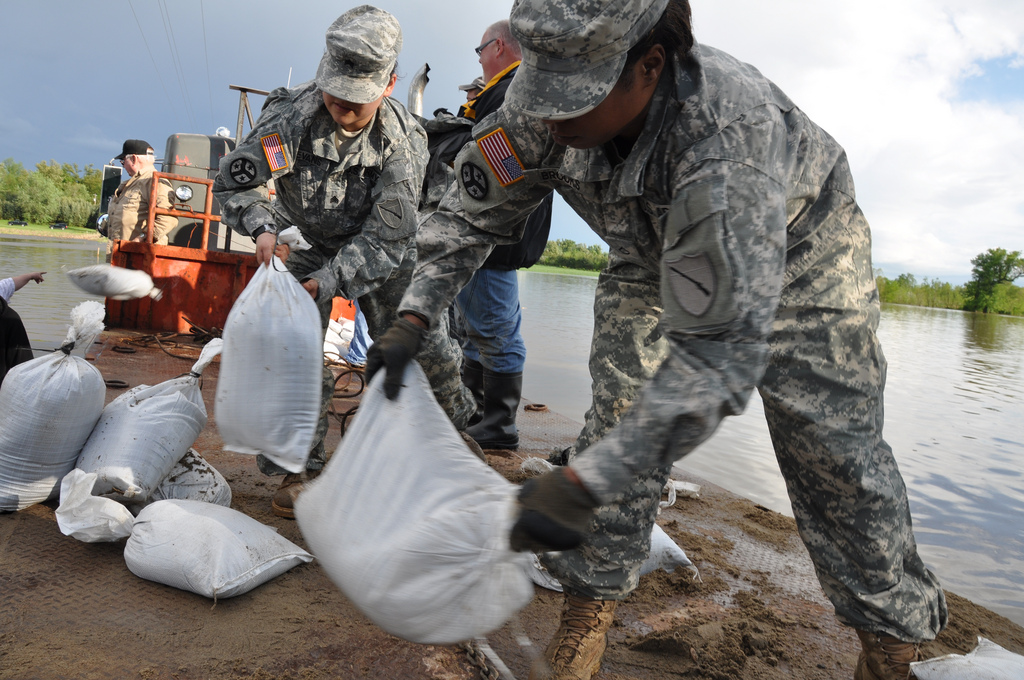
Kentucky Guard unloading sandbags during flood, Oscar

According to the EPA "Flooding is becoming more severe in the Southeast. Since 1958, the amount of precipitation during heavy rainstorms has increased by 27 percent in the Southeast, and the trend toward increasingly heavy rainstorms is likely to continue. The Tennessee Valley Authority (TVA) and the U.S. Army Corps of Engineers operate Kentucky Dam, Wolf Creek Dam, and other dams to prevent serious floods on the Ohio, Tennessee, and Cumberland rivers. The agencies release water from the reservoirs behind these dams before the winter flood season. By lowering water levels, these releases provide greater capacity for the reservoirs behind those dams to prevent flooding. Nevertheless, dams and other flood control structures cannot prevent all floods. The Ohio River has flooded Louisville several times, for example, and flash floods have caused property destruction and deaths throughout Kentucky".

According to the EPA "Increasingly severe droughts could pose challenges for river transportation. The drought of 2005 closed portions of the lower Ohio River to commercial navigation, which delayed shipments of crops and other products between Kentucky and the Mississippi River. In 2012, a drought caused navigation restrictions on the lower Mississippi River, which cost the region more than $275 million".

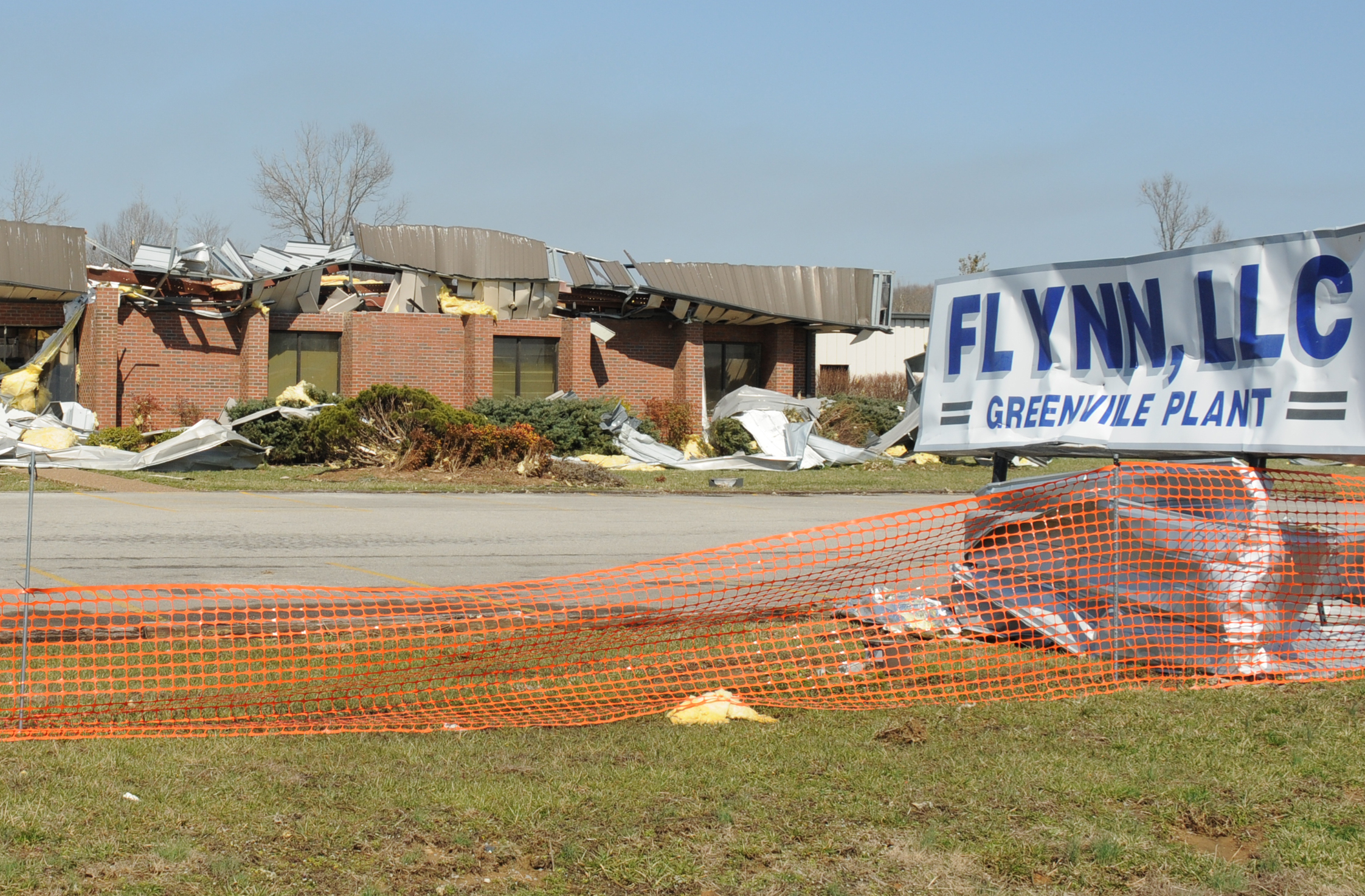
Storm damage, Greenville

According to the EPA "Droughts also affect the amount of electricity from hydroelectric dams. During the 2007 drought, total production from the TVA's hydroelectric plants fell by more than 30 percent, which forced the TVA to meet customer demand by using more expensive fuel-burning power plants". According to the Fifth National Climate Assessment published in 2023, "Appalachian states like Kentucky and West Virginia have seen devastating flooding from rainstorms".

== Aquatic ecosystems ==
According to the EPA "Changing climate can harm aquatic ecosystems. Warmer water lowers the level of dissolved oxygen in surface water, which can severely limit fish populations. Because fish cannot regulate their body temperatures, warmer water can make a stream uninhabitable for fish that require cooler water. Warmer temperatures can also increase the frequency of algal blooms, which can be toxic and further reduce dissolved oxygen. Summer droughts may amplify these effects, while periods of extreme rainfall can increase the impacts of pollution on streams".

== Agriculture and livestock ==
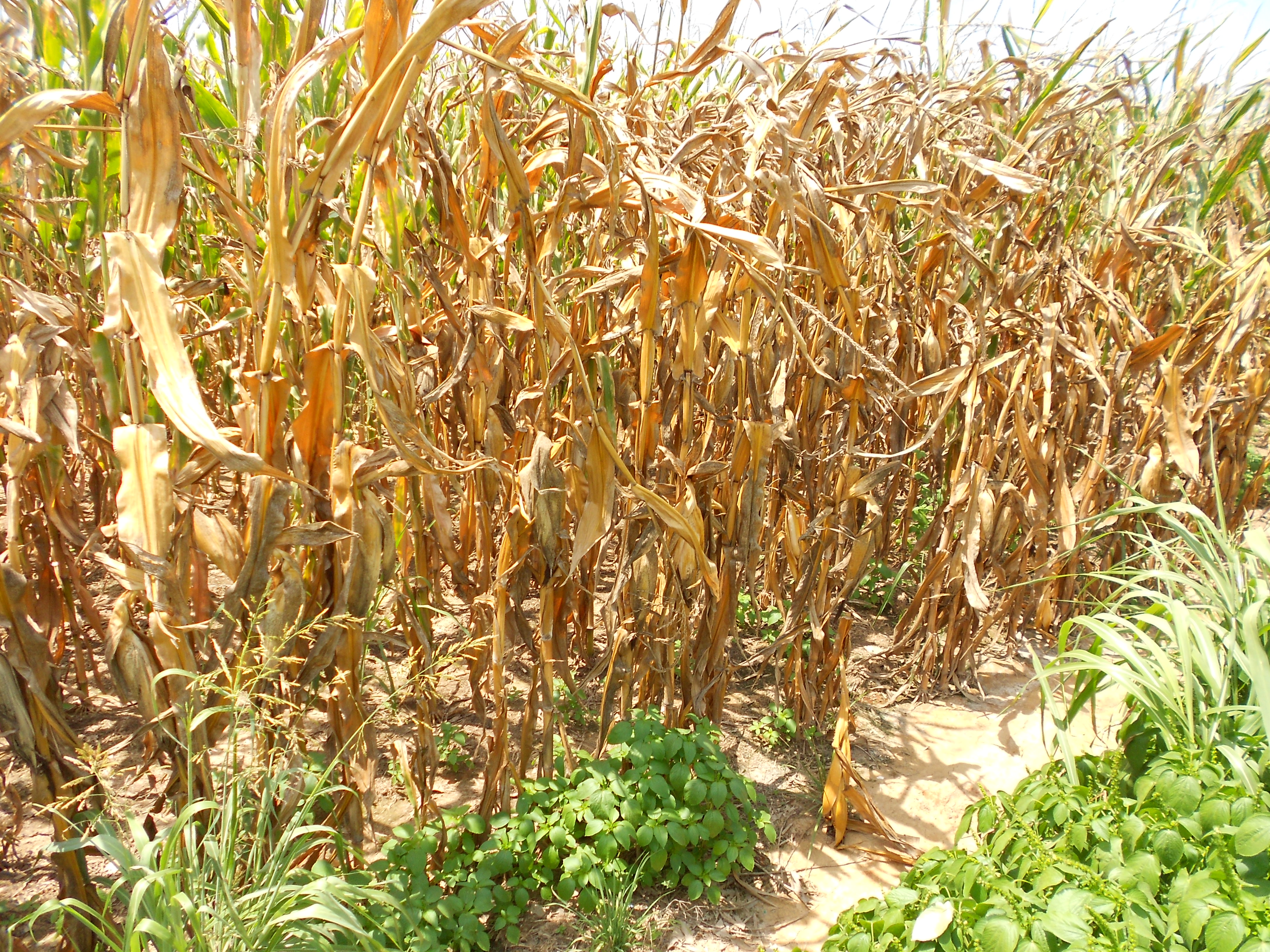
Drought-stressed corn

According to the EPA "Longer frost-free growing seasons and increased concentrations of atmospheric carbon dioxide tend to increase yields for many crops during an average year. But more severe droughts and more hot days are likely to reduce yields, especially in the western half of Kentucky, which in seventy years is likely to have 15 to 30 more days with temperatures above 95°F than it has today. Even on irrigated fields, higher temperatures are likely to reduce yields of corn, and possibly soybeans. Higher temperatures are also likely to reduce livestock productivity: hot weather causes cows to eat less, grow more slowly, and produce less milk, and it can threaten their health". In addition, "black vultures in Kentucky are moving north due to climate change and killing more cattle every year due to their newly expanded range".

== Forest resources ==
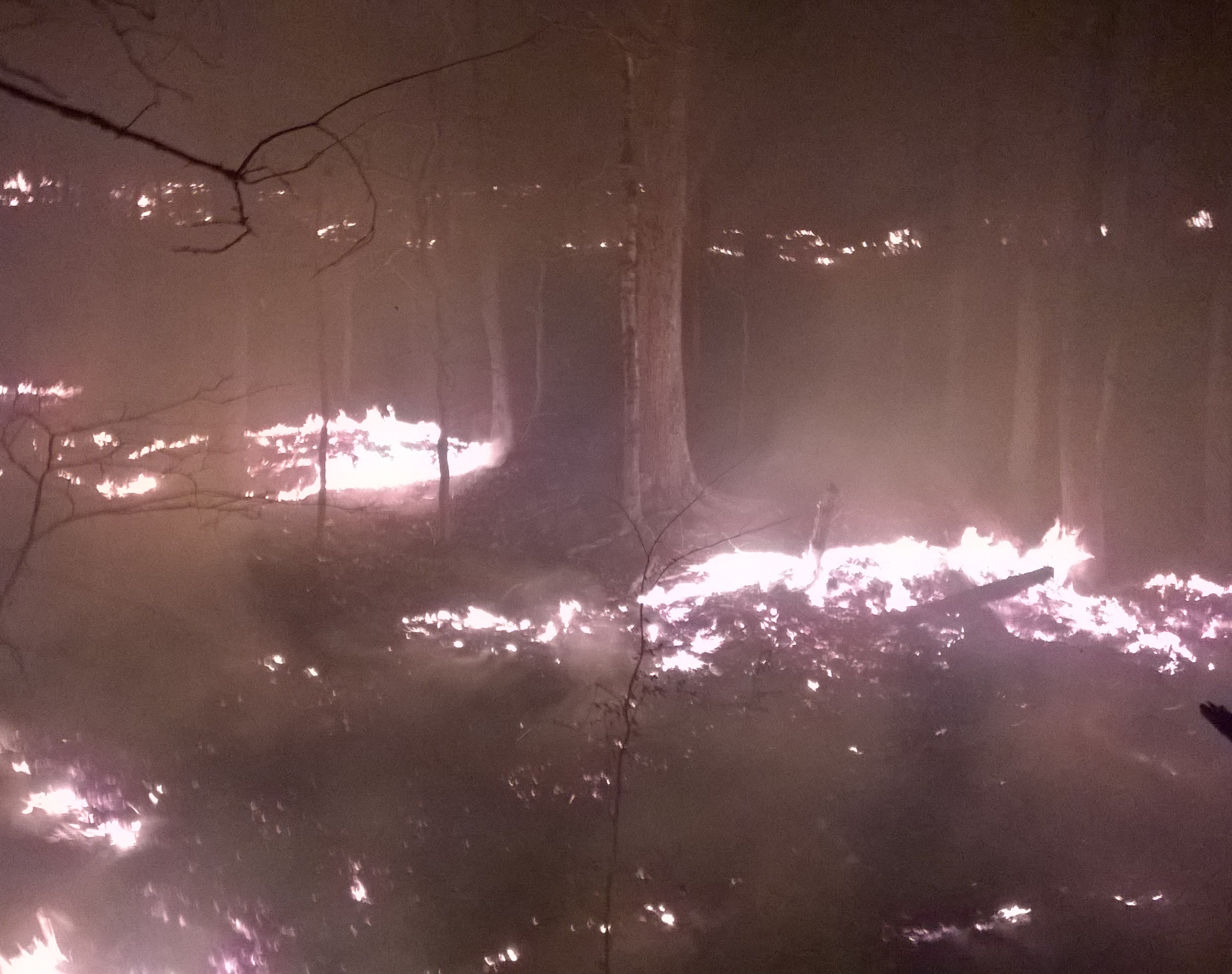
2016 wildfire, Land Between the Lakes

According to the EPA "Higher temperatures and changes in rainfall are unlikely to substantially reduce forest cover in Kentucky, but the composition of those forests may change. More droughts would reduce forest productivity, and climate change is also likely to increase the damage that insects and diseases cause to forests. Yet longer growing seasons and increased carbon dioxide concentrations could more than offset the losses from those factors. In central Kentucky, the population of maple, beech, and birch trees is likely to decline, in favor of the oak and hickory trees that dominate forests in most of the state".

== Effect on human health ==
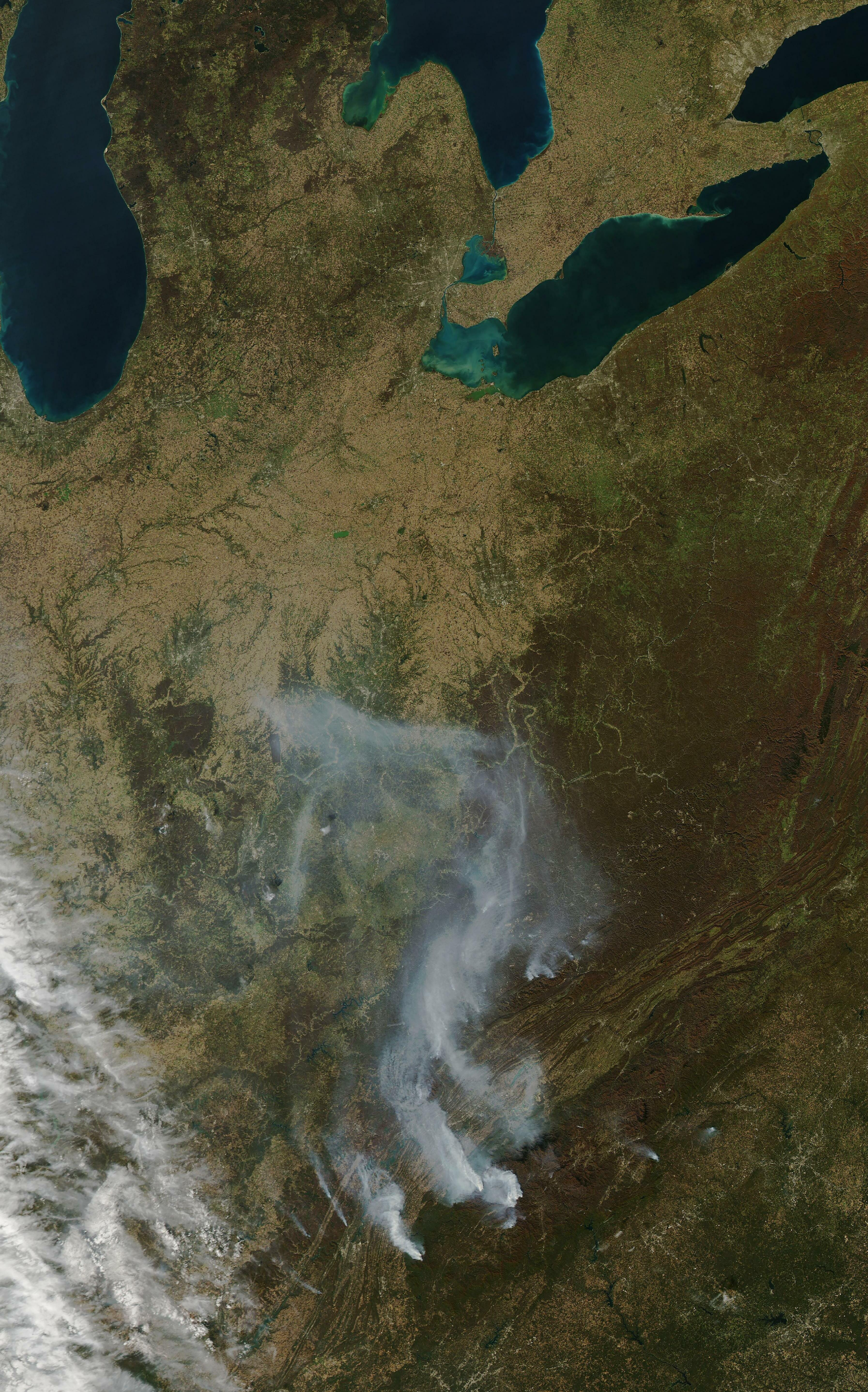
Smoke and air pollution from the 2016 southeast wildfires viewed from space

An increase in temperatures can have a negative effect on human health, particularly in people with underlying health conditions. Higher temperatures can increase smog. Ground level ozone found in smog aggravates asthma and other lung conditions.

== See also ==
- List of U.S. states and territories by carbon dioxide emissions
- Plug-in electric vehicles in Kentucky
- Greenhouse gas emissions in Kentucky
