= 2026 in Kentucky =

- Decades: 2000s; 2010s; 2020s
- See also: History of Kentucky; Historical outline of Kentucky; List of years in Kentucky; 2026 in the United States

The following is a list of events of the year 2026 in Kentucky.

== Incumbents ==
=== State Government ===
- Governor: Andy Beshear (D)

== Events ==
=== January ===
- January 1 – A Wolfe County woman is charged with fetal homicide for allegedly inducing her own abortion using abortion pills.

=== March ===
- March 24 – A judge sentences former governor Matt Bevin to 60 days in jail after finding him in contempt of court for failing to disclose financial details. The trial is tied to accusations by Bevin's 19-year-old adopted son, who alleged that his adoptive parents abandoned him.

=== April ===
- April 30 – A bank robber kills two employees of a U.S. Bank in Berea. An 18-year-old man is arrested.

=== May ===
- May 2 – The 2026 Kentucky Derby, the 152nd Kentucky Derby, takes place at the Churchill Downs racetrack in Louisville. Golden Tempo wins the race; his trainer Cherie DeVaux is the first female trainer to win the Kentucky Derby.
- May 11 – the Kentucky's 4th congressional district republican primary (between Thomas Massie and Ed Gallrein) becomes the most expensive U.S. House primary in American history, with over $25.6 million in ad spending beating the prior record of $25.2 million from the Democratic Primary for New York's 16th congressional district in 2024. By May 17, ad spending exceeded $32 million, with pro-Israel interest groups accounting for over $9 million of the spending against Massie.
- May 18 – The Lexington Fire Department reports that a house on Needlerush Drive in Lexington was damaged by a fire, displacing five people including a neighbor.
- May 19 – Kentucky's 4th congressional district republican primary, Thomas Massie loses to Ed Gallrein.

=== June ===
- June 13 – The Louisville Kings beat the DC Defenders 27–20 to win the 2026 United Bowl in the Kings' first season.
- June 27 – Four people are killed by heavy flooding in Madison and Jackson Counties.

=== July ===
- July 28 – Governor Beshear issues an ultimatum to Senator Mitch McConnell, who has been hospitalized since June 14, demanding McConnell prove he is able to serve or resign from office.

=== August ===
- August 7 – Kentucky State Thorobrettes women's basketball player Aminata Seck, a Senegalese national, is detained by ICE at Muhammad Ali International Airport while the team is traveling to an HBCU tournament.
- August 15 – A teenager is killed and four people injured in a shooting at a Lexington park during a community event.
- August 20–30 – The Kentucky State Fair takes place in Louisville.
- August 28 – State Attorney General Russell Coleman sues prediction market Kalshi, arguing the platform is operating as an unlicensed sportsbook.

=== September ===
- September 3 – Matt Bevin is arrested by sheriff's deputies in Paris, Kentucky, while playing an extra in a Great American Family Christmas movie. Bevin is arrested on a bench warrant for contempt of court, and he is charged with resistance to a court order.
- September 5 – The Kentucky Wildcats football team plays their first game with coach Will Stein, against Youngstown State at Kroger Field. Over 100 fans report possible heat stroke.
- September 14 – Mitch McConnell makes his first public appearance since his hospitalization.

=== October ===
- October 4 – Louisville City FC beats Hartford Athletic 1–0 to win the 2026 USL Cup.

=== November ===
- November 3 – Elections are held.
  - 2026 United States Senate election in Kentucky: State Representative Andy Barr wins election, beating Democratic former state representative Charles Booker.

== See also ==
- 2026 in the United States
