= 2025 in Kentucky =

- Decades: 2000s; 2010s; 2020s
- See also: History of Kentucky; Historical outline of Kentucky; List of years in Kentucky; 2025 in the United States

The following is a list of events of the year 2025 in Kentucky.

== Incumbents ==
=== State government ===
- Governor: Andy Beshear (D)

== Events ==
- January 4 – Governor Andy Beshear declares a state of emergency for the state, amidst the upcoming winter storm.
- March 5 - Florida-based grocer Publix opens their first Lexington location on Citation Boulevard.
- May 3 – Sovereignty wins the 2025 Kentucky Derby.

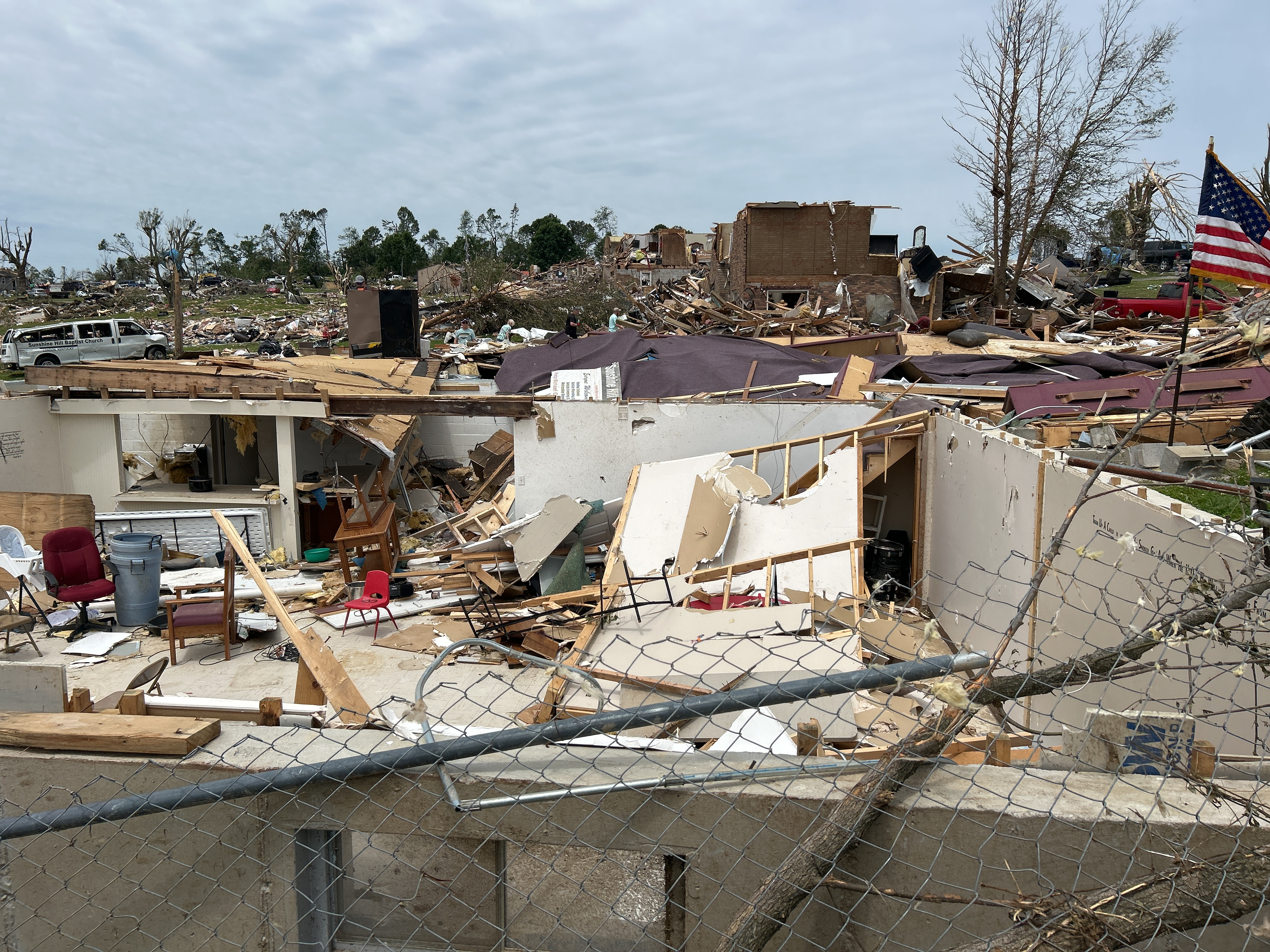
May 18: Aftermath of the Somerset–London tornado in London.

- May 16 – A large tornado kills 18 in Kentucky. 17 of the deaths are in Laurel County and one is in Pulaski County.
- May 21 – The Justice Department moves to cancel a consent decree with the Louisville Metro Police Department.
- July 13 – During a traffic stop, a man shoots a state trooper near the Blue Grass Airport in Lexington. The gunman drives to a nearby church, where he shoots four people, killing two, before being killed by police.
- July 17 – Police in Covington arrest 13 people during a protest on the John A. Roebling Suspension Bridge connecting Covington to Cincinnati, Ohio. Two journalists are among the arrested, though their charges are later dropped. The protest was held in response to Immigration and Customs Enforcement detaining a Muslim chaplain from Egypt in Cincinnati.
- July 21 – Former Louisville Metro Police Detective Brett Hankison is sentenced to 33 months in federal prison for his role in the killing of Breonna Taylor.
- August 18 – Governor Beshear bans the sale of bromazolam, or "designer Xanax", in the state.
- October 7 – The United Football League announces the formation of the Louisville Kings.
- November 4 – UPS Flight 2976 crashes and explodes while taking off from Louisville Muhammad Ali International Airport.
- November 21 – Four drones are stolen from Fort Campbell.
- December 9 – One student is killed and another injured in a shooting at Kentucky State University in Frankfort. A grand jury later declines to indict the shooter, the father of a third student, finding that the shooting was in defense of his son and himself.
- December 31 – A federal judge dismisses a police reform settlement between the city of Louisville and the Justice Department.

== See also ==
- 2025 in the United States
