= 2024 United States presidential election in Oregon =

- November 5, 2024
- Turnout: 75% (▼7 pp)

Nominee	Kamala Harris	Donald Trump
Party	Democratic	Republican
Home state	California	Florida
Running mate	Tim Walz	JD Vance
Electoral vote	8	0
Popular vote	1,240,600	919,480
Percentage	55.27%	40.97%

Harris
40–50%
50–60%
60–70%
70–80%
80–90%
90–100%
Trump
40–50%
50–60%
60–70%
70–80%
80–90%
90–100%
Tie/No data
President before election
Joe Biden
Democratic
Elected President
Donald Trump
Republican

The 2024 United States presidential election in Oregon took place on Tuesday, November 5, 2024, as part of the 2024 United States presidential election in which all 50 states plus the District of Columbia participated. Oregon voters chose electors to represent them in the Electoral College via a popular vote. The state of Oregon has eight electoral votes in the Electoral College, following reapportionment due to the 2020 United States census in which the state gained a seat.

Democrats have won Oregon in every presidential election starting in 1988, and have consistently done so by double digits starting in 2008. A blue state, although not as strongly as neighboring California and Washington, Oregon is part of the Democratic-leaning West Coast, and was predicted to go comfortably for Democrat Kamala Harris (from neighboring California) in 2024.

Harris carried Oregon by a 14.3% margin, which was slightly closer than in 2020. Oregon shifted to the right by a much smaller margin than the majority of states in this election, as Joe Biden had won Oregon by 16.1% in 2020. This can also be said about neighboring Washington, which also largely resisted the national red wave. Oregon was one of the few states to have many counties shift leftward. Democrats also gained a U.S. House seat in Oregon in the concurrent U.S. House elections in Oregon.

Oregon and Washington shifted rightwards by less than 2%, much less than the national shift of about 6 percentage points, including the trend of Harris significantly underperforming Biden in many blue states, such as her home state of California. Trump's vote share in Oregon in this election marked the highest for a Republican candidate in a presidential election since Mitt Romney in 2012.

Harris also recorded the strongest Democratic presidential performance in Multnomah County in modern history.

== Primary elections ==
=== Republican primary ===
The Oregon Republican primary was held on May 21, 2024, the same date as the Kentucky caucuses.

Oregon Republican primary, May 21, 2024
Candidate	Votes	Percentage	Actual delegate count		
Candidate	Votes	Percentage	Pledged	Unpledged	Total
Donald Trump	294,744	91.6%	31		31
Write-in votes	27,209	8.5%			
Total:	321,983	100.0%	31		31

=== Democratic primary ===
The Oregon Democratic primary was held on May 21, 2024, the same date as the Kentucky primary.

Oregon Democratic primary, May 21, 2024
Candidate	Votes	%	Delegates
Joe Biden (incumbent)	397,702	87.13	66
Marianne Williamson	33,603	7.36	0
Write-in votes	25,135	5.51	—
Total	456,440	100%	66

=== Minor parties ===
Minor parties in Oregon nominate by nominating delegates to their national conventions, or for the We the People and Independent parties, holding a nominating convention. They are allowed to self-finance a primary, but no party chose to do so. The following candidates' nominations were accepted by Oregon's secretary of state:

Minor party nominations in Oregon
Party	Candidate
Libertarian	Chase Oliver
We The People	Robert F. Kennedy Jr.
Progressive Party	Cornel West
Pacific Green	Jill Stein
Constitution Party	Randall Terry

The Republican Party issued a legal challenge to Libertarian party ballot access that was rejected by the secretary of state.

== General election ==
Oregon is considered solidly Democratic, and Donald Trump did not pay the $3,500 required for a candidate statement in the ballot handbook, although candidate statements were provided by the Democratic, We the People, Libertarian, and Pacific Green candidates. Notably, Oregon's third-largest party, the Independent Party of Oregon, did not nominate a candidate, although it had cross-nominated Joe Biden in 2020.

In the early hours of October 28, an incendiary device was placed in a ballot drop box in Portland. A total of 3 ballots were damaged, while the rest were unharmed due to the ballot box's fire suppression system.

=== Predictions ===
Source	Ranking	As of
Cook Political Report	Solid D	December 19, 2023
Inside Elections	Solid D	April 26, 2023
Sabato's Crystal Ball	Safe D	June 29, 2023
Decision Desk HQ/The Hill	Safe D	August 26, 2024
CNalysis	Solid D	December 30, 2023
The Economist	Safe D	September 12, 2024
538	Solid D	October 23, 2024
NBC News	Safe D	October 6, 2024
YouGov	Safe D	October 16, 2024
Split Ticket	Safe D	November 1, 2024

=== Polling ===
Kamala Harris vs. Donald Trump

Poll source	Date(s) administered	Sample size (Note: Key: A – all adults RV – registered voters LV – likely voters V – unclear)	Margin of error	Kamala Harris Democratic	Donald Trump Republican	Other / Undecided
Public Policy Polling (D) (Note: This poll was sponsored by the Northwest Progressive Institute)	October 16–17, 2024	716 (LV)	± 3.7%	53%	41%	6%
Hoffman Research	July 24–26, 2024	700 (LV)	± 3.7%	49%	44%	7%

Hypothetical polling with Robert F. Kennedy Jr.

Kamala Harris vs. Donald Trump vs. Robert F. Kennedy Jr. vs. Jill Stein

Poll source	Date(s) administered	Sample size	Margin of error	Kamala Harris Democratic	Donald Trump Republican	Robert Kennedy Jr Independent	Jill Stein Green	Other / Undecided
Hoffman Research	July 24–26, 2024	700 (LV)	± 3.7%	45%	40%	7%	1%	7%

Hypothetical polling with Joe Biden and Donald Trump

Joe Biden vs. Donald Trump

Poll source	Date(s) administered	Sample size	Margin of error	Joe Biden Democratic	Donald Trump Republican	Other / Undecided
The Bullfinch Group (Note: Poll sponsored by The Independent Center)	April 16–23, 2024	250 (RV)	± 6.2%	52%	40%	8%
John Zogby Strategies (Note: Poll conducted for Kennedy's campaign)	April 13–21, 2024	419 (LV)	–	47%	44%	9%
Emerson College	October 31 – November 1, 2022	975 (LV)	± 3.1%	51%	35%	14%
Emerson College	September 30 – October 1, 2022	796 (LV)	± 3.4%	50%	41%	9%

Joe Biden vs. Donald Trump vs. Robert F. Kennedy Jr. vs. Cornel West vs. Jill Stein

Poll source	Date(s) administered	Sample size	Margin of error	Joe Biden Democratic	Donald Trump Republican	Robert Kennedy Jr Independent	Cornel West Independent	Jill Stein Green	Other / Undecided
The Bullfinch Group	April 16–23, 2024	250 (RV)	± 6.2%	40%	29%	19%	1%	3%	8%

Hypothetical polling with other candidates

Joe Biden vs. Robert F. Kennedy Jr.

Poll source	Date(s) administered	Sample size	Margin of error	Joe Biden Democratic	Robert F. Kennedy Jr. Independent	Other / Undecided
John Zogby Strategies	April 13–21, 2024	419 (LV)	–	40%	49%	11%

Robert F. Kennedy Jr. vs. Donald Trump

Poll source	Date(s) administered	Sample size	Margin of error	Robert F. Kennedy Jr. Independent	Donald Trump Republican	Other / Undecided
John Zogby Strategies	April 13–21, 2024	419 (LV)	–	42%	39%	19%

=== Results ===
State House district results: Trump 40–50% 50–60% 60–70% 70–80% / Harris 50–60% 60–70% 70–80% 80–90% 90–100%

2024 United States presidential election in Oregon
Party	Candidate	Votes	%	±%
Democratic	Kamala Harris; Tim Walz	1,240,600	55.27%	▼1.18%
Republican	Donald Trump; JD Vance	919,480	40.97%	▲0.60%
We the People	Robert F. Kennedy Jr. (withdrawn); Nicole Shanahan (withdrawn)	33,733	1.50%	N/A
Pacific Green	Jill Stein; Butch Ware	19,099	0.85%	▲0.35%
Libertarian	Chase Oliver; Mike ter Maat	9,061	0.40%	▼1.35%
Progressive	Cornel West; Melina Abdullah	5,644	0.25%	▲0.04%
Constitution	Randall Terry; Stephen Broden	1,850	0.08%	N/A
Write-in		15,026	0.67%	▼0.05%
Total votes		2,244,493	100.00%	N/A

==== By county ====
County	Kamala Harris Democratic		Donald Trump Republican		Various candidates Other parties		Margin		Total
County	#	%	#	%	#	%	#	%	Total
Baker	2,343	24.17%	7,060	72.83%	291	3.00%	-4,717	-48.66%	9,694
Benton	33,909	67.50%	14,187	28.24%	2,136	4.25%	19,722	39.26%	50,232
Clackamas	130,580	53.03%	106,387	43.20%	9,273	3.77%	24,193	9.82%	246,240
Clatsop	12,533	53.81%	9,913	42.56%	844	3.62%	2,620	11.25%	23,290
Columbia	12,895	41.15%	17,227	54.98%	1,212	3.87%	-4,332	-13.83%	31,334
Coos	13,731	38.42%	20,849	58.34%	1,155	3.23%	-7,118	-19.92%	35,735
Crook	3,836	23.54%	12,012	73.71%	449	2.76%	-8,176	-50.17%	16,297
Curry	5,737	40.40%	8,000	56.34%	463	3.26%	-2,263	-15.94%	14,200
Deschutes	68,108	53.47%	54,850	43.06%	4,417	3.47%	13,258	10.41%	127,375
Douglas	18,386	29.75%	41,561	67.24%	1,860	3.01%	-23,175	-37.50%	61,807
Gilliam	291	25.66%	805	70.99%	38	3.35%	-514	-45.33%	1,134
Grant	816	18.31%	3,490	78.32%	150	3.37%	-2,674	-60.01%	4,456
Harney	797	18.73%	3,307	77.72%	151	3.55%	-2,510	-58.99%	4,255
Hood River	8,364	65.82%	3,854	30.33%	489	3.85%	4,510	35.49%	12,707
Jackson	54,065	45.22%	61,743	51.64%	3,764	3.15%	-7,678	-6.42%	119,572
Jefferson	3,941	33.54%	7,454	63.44%	355	3.02%	-3,513	-29.90%	11,750
Josephine	16,928	34.11%	31,129	62.72%	1,571	3.17%	-14,201	-28.61%	49,628
Klamath	9,856	27.75%	24,675	69.48%	984	2.77%	-14,819	-41.73%	35,515
Lake	681	16.16%	3,421	81.20%	111	2.63%	-2,740	-65.04%	4,213
Lane	125,775	59.53%	77,376	36.62%	8,134	3.85%	48,399	22.91%	211,285
Lincoln	17,112	57.42%	11,645	39.07%	1,047	3.51%	5,467	18.34%	29,804
Linn	25,749	36.05%	43,078	60.31%	2,602	3.64%	-17,329	-24.26%	71,429
Malheur	2,884	26.35%	7,710	70.44%	351	3.21%	-4,826	-44.09%	10,945
Marion	73,970	47.21%	77,089	49.20%	5,632	3.59%	-3,119	-1.99%	156,691
Morrow	1,138	24.05%	3,408	72.02%	186	3.93%	-2,270	-47.97%	4,732
Multnomah	325,927	78.68%	70,759	17.08%	17,564	4.24%	255,168	61.60%	414,250
Polk	22,034	46.30%	23,768	49.94%	1,791	3.76%	-1,734	-3.64%	47,593
Sherman	233	20.03%	890	76.53%	40	3.44%	-657	-56.49%	1,163
Tillamook	7,747	47.67%	7,971	49.05%	534	3.29%	-224	-1.38%	16,252
Umatilla	9,251	29.63%	20,973	67.17%	1,001	3.21%	-11,722	-37.54%	31,225
Union	4,107	28.18%	9,942	68.22%	525	3.60%	-5,835	-40.04%	14,574
Wallowa	1,573	30.79%	3,366	65.90%	169	3.31%	-1,793	-35.10%	5,108
Wasco	6,069	45.32%	6,837	51.06%	485	3.62%	-768	-5.74%	13,391
Washington	193,013	64.78%	92,590	31.08%	12,346	4.14%	100,423	33.70%	297,949
Wheeler	210	24.19%	618	71.20%	40	4.61%	-408	-47.00%	868
Yamhill	26,011	45.00%	29,536	51.10%	2,253	3.90%	-3,525	-6.10%	57,800
Totals	1,240,600	55.27%	919,480	40.97%	84,413	3.76%	321,120	14.31%	2,244,493

County that flipped from Democratic to Republican

- Marion (largest city: Salem)

==== By congressional district ====
Harris won five of six congressional districts.

District	Harris	Trump	Representative
1st	66.71%	29.20%	Suzanne Bonamici
2nd	34.93%	61.93%	Cliff Bentz
3rd	70.74%	25.11%	Earl Blumenauer (118th Congress)
3rd	70.74%	25.11%	Maxine Dexter (119th Congress)
4th	54.14%	42.16%	Val Hoyle
5th	52.39%	43.90%	Lori Chavez-DeRemer (118th Congress)
5th	52.39%	43.90%	Janelle Bynum (119th Congress)
6th	53.75%	42.45%	Andrea Salinas

== Analysis ==
Trump flipped back Marion County, after losing it in 2020 but winning it in 2016.

Trump also became the first Republican to win the White House without winning Deschutes County since it was created in 1916. Deschutes County shifted leftward by about 2%, with Harris winning the highest vote share in the county since 1964.

== See also ==
- United States presidential elections in Oregon
- 2024 United States presidential election
- 2024 Democratic Party presidential primaries
- 2024 Republican Party presidential primaries
- 2024 United States elections

== Notes ==
Partisan clients
