= Transportation in Kentucky =

Transportation in Kentucky includes roads, airports, waterways and rail.

== Roads ==
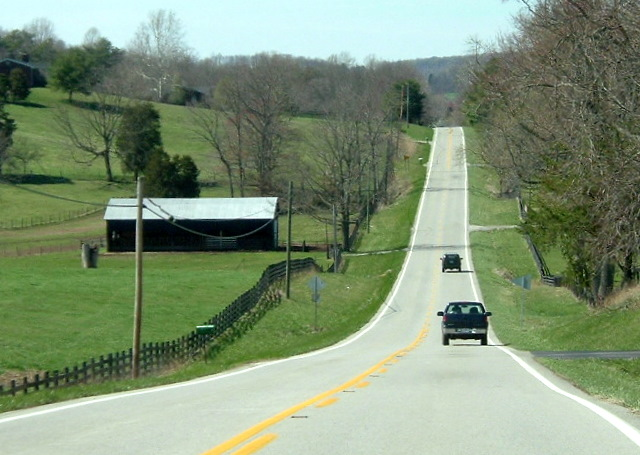
At 464 miles (747 km) long, Kentucky Route 80 is the longest route in Kentucky, pictured here west of Somerset.

Kentucky is served by six major interstate highways (I-24, I-64, I-65, I-69, I-71, I-75), seven parkways, and six bypasses and spurs. The parkways were originally toll roads, but on November 22, 2006, Governor Ernie Fletcher ended the toll charges on the William H. Natcher Parkway and the Audubon Parkway, the last two parkways in Kentucky to charge tolls for access. The related toll booths have been demolished.

Ending the tolls some seven months ahead of schedule was generally agreed to have been a positive economic development for transportation in Kentucky. In June 2007, a law went into effect raising the speed limit on rural portions of Kentucky Interstates from 65 miles per hour (105 km/h) to 70 miles per hour (110 km/h).

Road tunnels include the interstate Cumberland Gap Tunnel and the rural Nada Tunnel.

Greyhound provides bus service to most major towns in the state.

== Rail ==
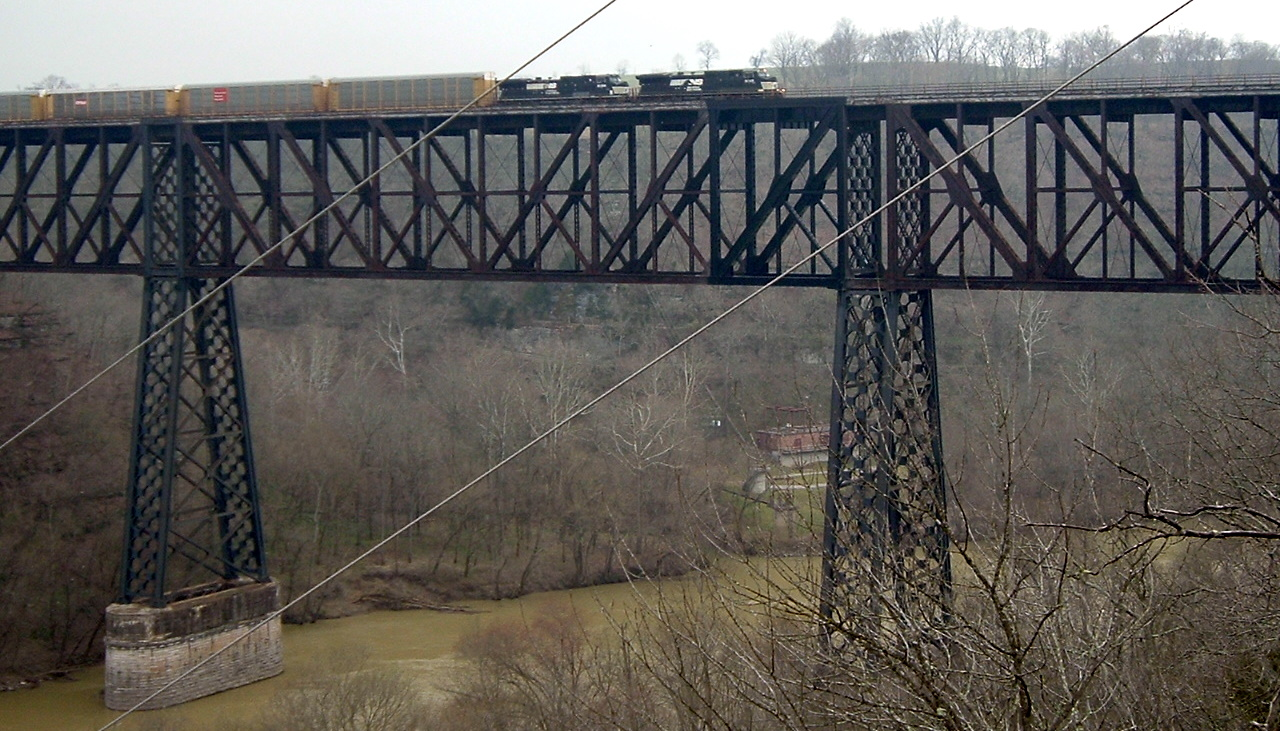
High Bridge over the Kentucky River was the tallest rail bridge in the world when it was completed in 1877.

- Ashland Transportation Center
- South Portsmouth-South Shore
- Fulton

Amtrak, the national passenger rail system, provides service to Ashland, South Portsmouth and Fulton, Kentucky. The Cardinal, Trains 50 and 51, is the line that offers Amtrak service to Ashland and South Portsmouth. Amtrak Trains 58 and 59, the City of New Orleans, serve Fulton. The Northern Kentucky area, is served by the Cardinal at the Cincinnati Union Terminal. The terminal is just across the Ohio River from Covington, Kentucky in Cincinnati. Louisville's Union Station last had train service in 2003 with the Kentucky Cardinal. Bowling Green last had service in 1979 with the Floridian.

As of 2004, there were approximately 2,640 miles (4,250.4 km) of railways in Kentucky, with about 65% of those being operated by CSX Transportation. Coal was by far the most common cargo, accounting for 76% of cargo loaded and 61% of cargo delivered.

Bardstown features a tourist attraction known as My Old Kentucky Dinner Train. Run along a 20-mile (30 km) stretch of rail purchased from CSX in 1987, guests are served a four-course meal as they make a two-and-a-half-hour round-trip between Bardstown and Limestone Springs. The Kentucky Railway Museum is located in nearby New Haven.

Other areas in Kentucky are reclaiming old railways in rail trail projects. One such project is Louisville's Big Four Bridge. If completed, the Big Four Bridge rail trail will contain the second longest pedestrian-only bridge in the world. The longest pedestrian-only bridge is also found in Kentucky — the Newport Southbank Bridge, popularly known as the "Purple People Bridge", connecting Newport to Cincinnati, Ohio.

== Air ==
Kentucky's primary airports include Louisville International Airport (Standiford Field), Cincinnati/Northern Kentucky International Airport, and Blue Grass Airport in Lexington. Louisville International Airport is home to UPS's Worldport, its international air-sorting hub. There are also a number of regional airports scattered across the state.

On August 27, 2006, Kentucky's Blue Grass Airport in Lexington was the site of a crash that killed 47 passengers and 2 crew members aboard a Bombardier Canadair Regional Jet designated Comair Flight 191, or Delta Air Lines Flight 5191, sometimes mistakenly identified by the press as Comair Flight 5191. The lone survivor was the flight's first officer, James Polehinke, who doctors determined to be brain damaged and unable to recall the crash at all.

== Water ==
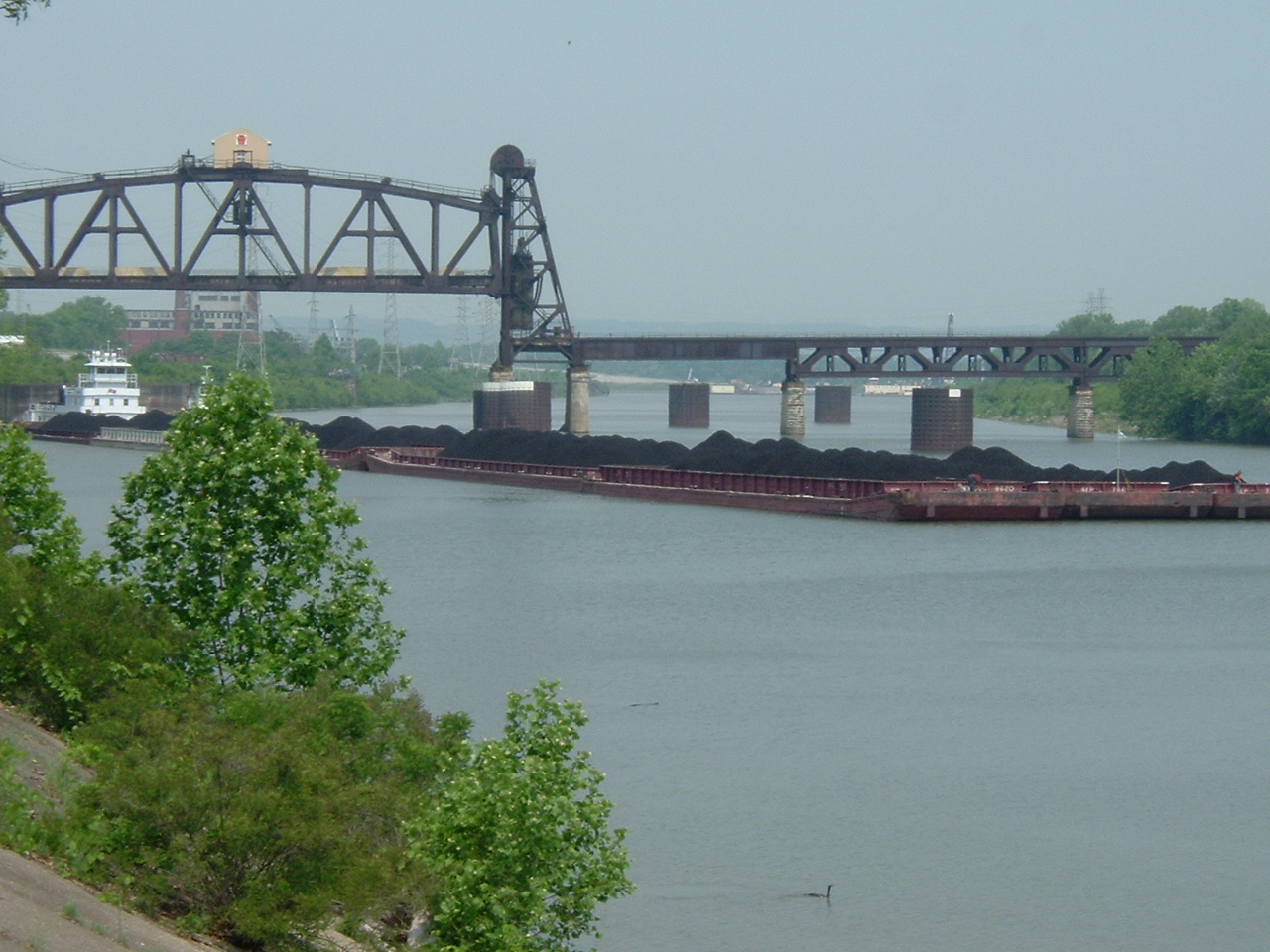
A barge hauling coal in the Louisville and Portland Canal, the only manmade section of the Ohio River

Being bounded by the two largest rivers in North America, water transportation has historically played a major role in Kentucky's economy. Most barge traffic on Kentucky waterways consists of coal that is shipped from both the Eastern and Western Coalfields, about half of which is used locally to power many power plants located directly off the Ohio River, with the rest being exported to other countries, most notably Japan.

Many of the largest ports in the United States are located in or adjacent to Kentucky, including:

- Port of Huntington-Tristate (includes Ashland, KY), largest inland port and 9th largest overall
- Cincinnati-Northern Kentucky, 5th largest inland port and 43rd overall
- Louisville-Southern Indiana, 7th largest inland port and 55th overall

As a state, Kentucky ranks 10th overall in port tonnage.

The only natural obstacle along the entire length of the Ohio River was the Falls of the Ohio, located just west of Downtown Louisville.

== See also ==
- Plug-in electric vehicles in Kentucky
