= 2024 Oregon Republican presidential primary =

- May 21, 2024

31 Republican National Convention delegates

Candidate	Donald Trump	Write-in votes
Home state	Florida	–
Delegate count	31	0
Popular vote	294,744	27,209
Percentage	91.6%	8.5%
- County results Trump: 80–90% >90%

The 2024 Oregon Republican presidential primary was held on May 21, 2024, as part of the Republican Party primaries for the 2024 presidential election. 31 delegates to the 2024 Republican National Convention will be allocated on a proportional basis. The contest was held alongside the Kentucky primary.

The Oregon Supreme Court declined to rule on a ballot access challenge to Donald Trump by Free Speech for the People, a Democrat-aligned nonprofit. As the sole candidate who filed, the Trump campaign declined to submit a $3,500 candidate statement for the statewide ballot handbook.

== Endorsements ==
Donald Trump

U.S. Representative

- Cliff Bentz, OR-02 (2021–present)

State legislators

- Christine Goodwin, Oregon State Representative from District 4 (2023–present) and District 2 (2021–2023)
- Virgle Osborne, Oregon State Representative from District 2 (2023–present)

Party Officials

- Alek Skarlatos, Douglas County Republican Precinct Committee Person for Precinct 12 (2022–present); Republican nominee for Oregon's 4th congressional district in 2020 and 2022

== Results ==
Oregon Republican primary, May 21, 2024
Candidate	Votes	Percentage	Actual delegate count		
Candidate	Votes	Percentage	Pledged	Unpledged	Total
Donald Trump	294,744	91.6%	31		31
Write-in votes	27,209	8.5%			
Total:	321,983	100.0%	31		31

== See also ==
- 2024 Republican Party presidential primaries
- 2024 United States presidential election
- 2024 United States presidential election in Oregon
- 2024 United States elections
