= Electoral reform in Kentucky =

U.S. state electoral reform

Electoral reform in Kentucky refers to efforts to change the voting laws in the Bluegrass State. In Kentucky, the state legislature is in charge of drawing both congressional and state legislative districts. The 1991 state legislative district plan was determined by the Supreme Court of Kentucky to be in violation of Section 33 of the Kentucky Constitution because it split an excessive number of counties in violation of the state constitutional requirement that the fewest counties possible be divided. Kentucky is one of only three states (the others are Florida and Virginia) that permanently disenfranchise all persons with felony convictions even after they have completed their full sentence. One out of every 17 Kentucky residents is disenfranchised.

In 2007, HB 550 was introduced to join the National Popular Vote Interstate Compact, but it died in committee. In October 2007, Kentucky Attorney General Greg Stumbo released to the State Board of Elections and Kentucky Secretary of State a report finding serious deficiencies in Kentucky's electronic voting machines.

== Recent call for change ==
Citizens of Kentucky are now calling for another electoral reform in Kentucky, stating that election requirements are unfair and do not compare to the rest of the country. The bill in question is KRS 83A.040.

== See also ==
Electoral reform in the United States
