= Solar power in Kentucky =

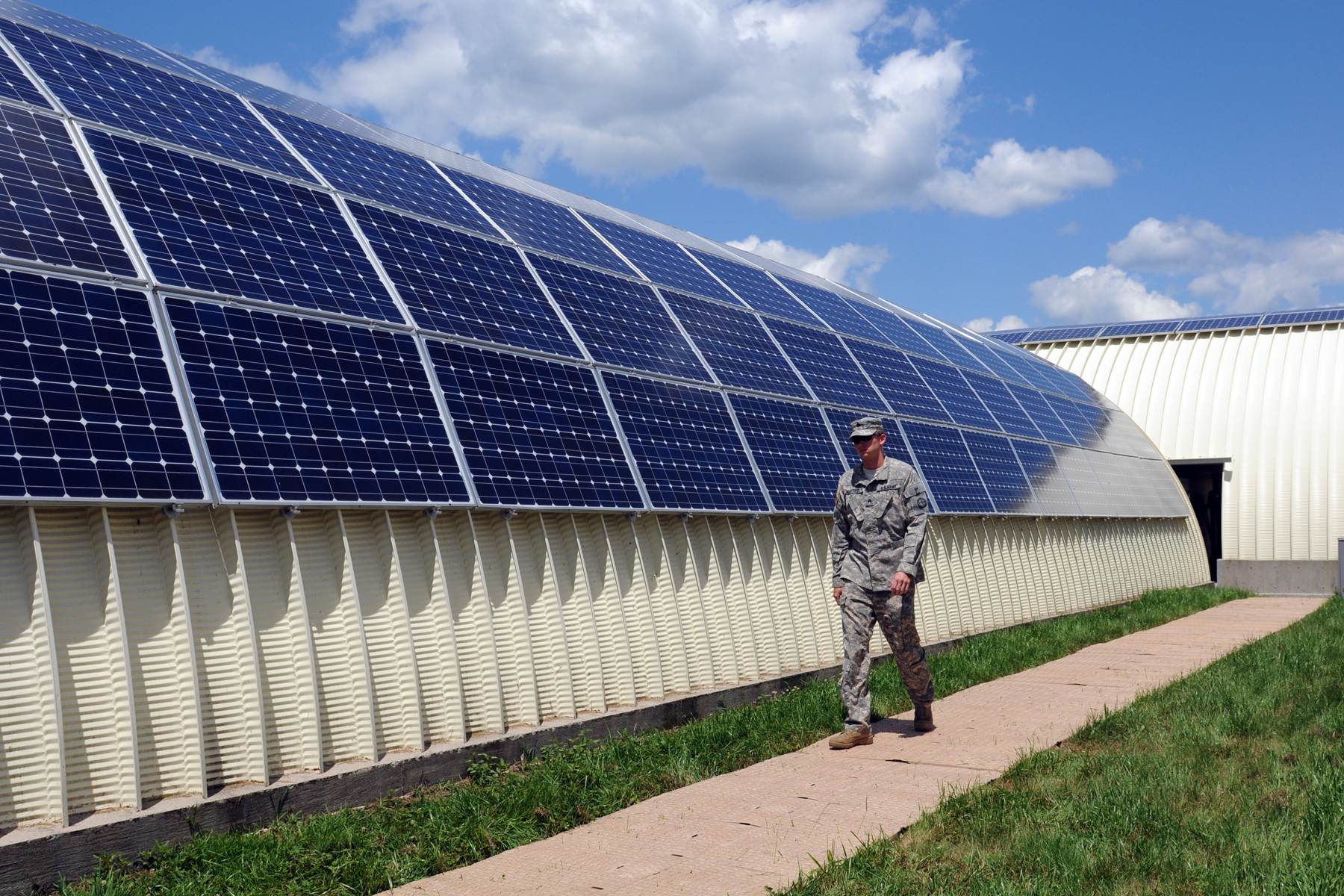
Solar roof, National Guard training facility, Artemus

Solar power in Kentucky has been growing in recent years due to new technological improvements and a variety of regulatory actions and financial incentives, particularly a 30% federal tax credit, available through 2016, for any size project. Kentucky could generate 10% of all of the electricity used in the United States from land cleared from coal mining in the state. Covering just one-fifth with photovoltaics would supply all of the state's electricity.

The Berea Solar Farm is a community solar farm, which opened with 60 235-watt solar panels (14.1 kW). All of the available panels sold out in four days.

A 2 MW single axis tracking solar farm began operation in 2011 in Bowling Green. As of 2011, the largest system on any farm in the state was the 100.32 kW array completed on November 1, 2011, in Fancy Farms. The first hospital in the state to use solar power is Rockcastle Regional Hospital in Mt. Vernon, which installed a 60.9 kW array on the roof in November, 2011.

In 2015, Fort Campbell installed a 1.9MW solar farm that provides 10% of the electricity used by the base.

Kentucky's only maker of solar panels is Alternative Energy Kentucky.

== Net metering ==
Kentucky has a net metering program that allows installations of up to 30 kW of on-site electrical generation to continuously roll over any excess generation to the next month. Participation is limited to 1% of utilities peak demand the prior year. The Kentucky Solar Energy Society is lobbying to increase the limit, noting that 17 states allow at least 2 MW capacity to use net metering. Three states have no limit - Arizona, New Jersey, and Ohio. Rhode Island has a 5 MW limit, and New Mexico has a limit of 80 MW.

== Insolation ==
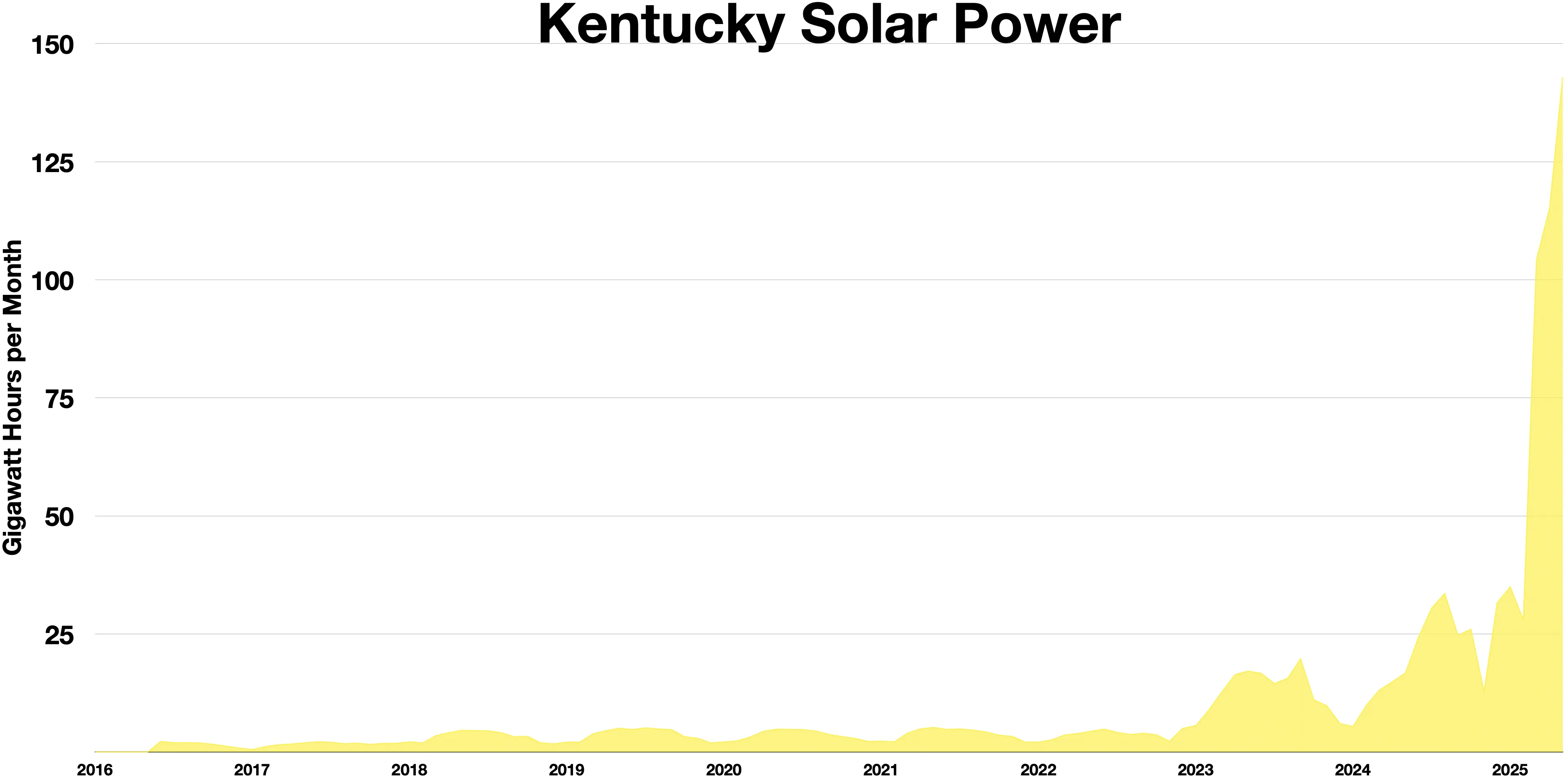
Kentucky solar power from 2016 to 2025

Kentucky has an average of about 4.5 sun hours per day, similar to Germany, which has 4.8 sun hours per day.

Source: NREL

== Installed capacity ==
Kentucky grid-connected PV capacity (MW)
Year	Capacity	Installed	% change
2010	0.2	0.2	
2011	3.3	3.1	1550%
2012	4.8	1.5	45%
2013	7.9	3.2	68%
2014	8.4	0.5	6%
2015	9.5	1.1	13%
2016	27	17.5	184%
2017	47	20	74%
2018	50	3	6.3%
2019	54.6	4.6	9.2%
2020	59.5	4.9	8.9%
2021	71	11.5	%
2022	157	86	%

== See also ==
- Wind power in Kentucky
- Solar power in the United States
- Renewable energy in the United States
