= Wind power in Kentucky =

Electricity from wind in one U.S. state

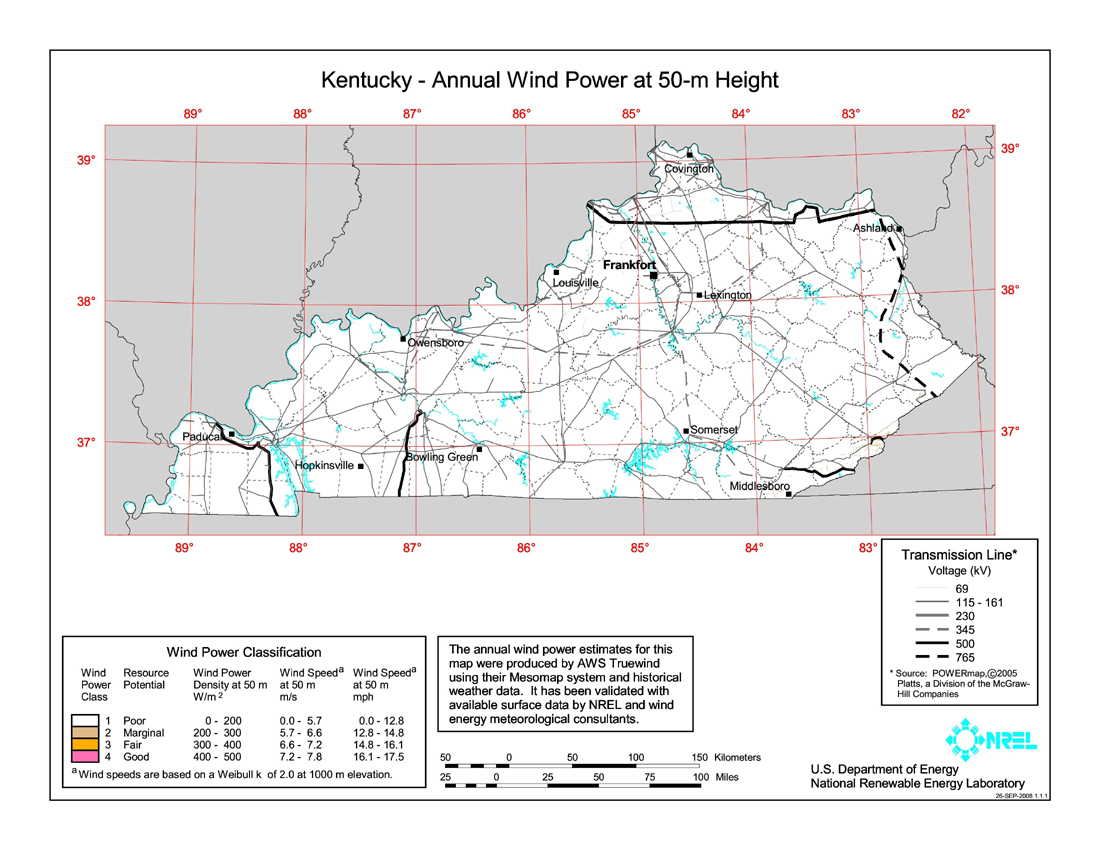
2008 wind potential map

Wind power in Kentucky has limited potential for development within the state since there are generally low wind speeds, though there are specific locations where it can be effective. The state has not passed renewable portfolio standard legislation, and there are no commercial-scale wind turbines. Kentucky may benefit from the development of wind power in Tennessee, an adjoining state with which it is collaborating, and from efforts by the Tennessee Valley Authority to both develop and import wind-generated electricity into the region.

== Kentucky New Energy Ventures ==
Small scale wind turbines spinning, at Madisonville Community College

Established in 2008, Kentucky New Energy Ventures was a state program to incentivize the development and commercialization of alternative fuel and renewable energy products, processes, and services. The program concluded in 2017 and has not been renewed by the state. The funds could have been used to stimulate private investment in Kentucky-based technology companies with high growth potential. KNEV made seed capital grants of $30,000, and investments ranging from $250,000 to $750,000.

== Mason County ==
In 2012, Mason County passed an ordinance which would prohibit the construction of large-scale wind farms, except in previously designated industrial zones, but would permit mid- to small scale turbines for use at a principal site, but not for sending the energy across electric transmission lines. Efforts by Duke Energy and NextEra Energy to develop a wind farm at Mays Lick were discontinued.

== Tennessee Valley Authority ==
The Tennessee Valley Authority service area covers most of Tennessee; portions of Alabama, Mississippi, and Kentucky; and small sections of Georgia, North Carolina, and Virginia. As of 2013, the agency, in addition to the Buffalo Mountain Wind Farm, had purchased agreements from power generated from wind farms outside its service area:

- 2012 - Enel Green Power, LLC - 201MW - Caney River Wind Farm, Elk County, Kansas
- 2012 - Invenergy - 200MW - Bishop Hill Wind Energy Center, Henry County, Illinois
- 2012 - Invenergy - 200MW - California Ridge Wind Energy Center, Champaign County, Illinois
- 2012 - NextEra Energy Resources - 150MW - White Oak Energy Center, McLean County, Illinois
- 2012 - NextEra Energy Resources - 165MW - Cimarron Wind Farm, Gray County, Kansas

A 2010 agreement with Iberdrola Renewables provided a potential 300MW future supply from Streator-Cayuga Ridge Wind Farm, Livingston County, Illinois

Clean Line Energy LLC is proposing a 700-mile power transmission line to bring wind energy from Oklahoma to the Tennessee Valley. The TVA would import 1,750 megawatts, about half of the power that could be transmitted. Developers began in 2007 to seek regulatory approval for the $2 billion project, but it was expected to take at least until 2020 to acquire it before construction can begin.

== See also ==
- Solar power in Kentucky
- Wind power in the United States
- Renewable energy in the United States
