= Bullitt's Lick =

Salt lick in Kentucky

Coordinates: 38°00′02″N 85°45′50″W

Bullitt's Lick is a historic salt lick 3 miles (4.8 km) west of Shepherdsville in Bullitt County, Kentucky. It was the first commercial supplier of salt in Kentucky, and the first industry in Kentucky as well, supplying jobs for many residents but also using slaves.

== History ==
Its high salinity levels in regards to other sources of water made it a popular spot for buffalo and others animals, causing natural roads for humans to use. Squire Boone noted killing a few buffalo by the lick in early 1779. Most such salt deposits in what is now Kentucky would have only been enough for a few settlers to use, in order to preserve their food. However, Bullitt's Lick was part of a concentration of salt, ranging from Bardstown Junction, Kentucky in the south, to across the Salt River to just north of present-day Fairdale, Kentucky, along the eastern side of the "Knobs" of the region.

Captain Thomas Bullitt discovered the salt lick in 1773, while surveying land for Colonel William Christian, who had been granted land due to his actions in the French and Indian War. Christian's family owned the salt lick, but had others obtain the salt, and pay the Christians rent in salt for using the land, with Henry Crist being the most prominent of these sharecroppers. Christian would not actually arrive at the salt lick until 1785, and would die from Native Americans the next year. His widow soon died, leaving it to his son John Henry Christian, who also died young, giving it to all of his five sisters. During John's brief ownership, his guardian and uncle Patrick Henry controlled it until John had reached legal age. Due to the sisters' marriages, control of the salt lick went to Alexander Scott Bullitt and William Pope Jr.

== Saltworks ==
The first actual saltworks on the property were in 1779. Salt was difficult to obtain in the area, as there were few transportation facilities. (Louisville, the first white settlement in the area, had only been established in 1778). Salt was extracted by boiling the water in 25 iron kettles above a 1000-gallon-sized trench of fire. These kettles originally weighed 100 pounds, but the later kettles would weigh up to 200 pounds. There would be three cycles of salt making in a 24-hour period. These furnaces were initially located by the salt lick itself, but once the nearby wood was used, the furnaces were moved to the newer supplies of wood, as that was a cheaper alternative than bringing the wood to the furnaces. Until 1780, it was the only saltworks west of Pennsylvania's Allegheny Mountains. This in turn made the Wilderness Road the "inland intermodal distribution system" in the territories of the United States. Joseph Field briefly worked for the salt works at Bullitt's Lick, and later was a member of the Lewis and Clark Expedition.

This salt would soon be used not only in Kentucky, but the Illinois Territory, Tennessee Territory, and far-away New Orleans as well. It was taken to New Orleans and Pittsburgh, Pennsylvania, by way of flatboats. The salt business would last until the development of navigation on Virginia's Kanawha River allowed steamboats to deliver its salt throughout the Ohio and Mississippi courses in 1830s, undercutting Bullitt's Lick's producers.

One side effect of Bullitt County's early salt making was the deforestation of much of its land. This was the impetus for the creation of Bernheim Arboretum and Research Forest in the early 20th century.

== See also ==
- Mann's Lick
- Big Bone Lick
