= Mann's Lick =

Historic salt lick, Kentucky, U.S.

Mann's Lick was a salt lick just north of the present-day Fairdale neighborhood of Louisville, Kentucky. It was named for John Mann, who belonged to a surveying party of Captain Thomas Bullitt in 1773.

The land was given to Colonel John Todd in 1780. When Todd died at the Battle of Blue Licks in 1782, the land went to his daughter Mary O. Todd. Joseph Brooks leased the land from Mary Todd in 1787, starting the saltworks immediately.

Brooks had originally been from Pennsylvania. He and his wife Nancy had left their home in 1779, traveling down the Ohio River to Maysville, Kentucky, and then walking the rest of the way to the Louisville area. He started working at Thomas Bullitt's Bullitt's Lick salt works, near Shepherdsville, Kentucky in 1784. After acquiring the Mann's Lick salt lick, he decided to build a salt furnace. He started by constructing a hollow-log pipe to pump water to his salt furnace; remains of these hollow logs were still available to be seen in the 1940s. Due to fear of Indian attack, fortifications were built to protect the site in 1788.

Due to salt being a necessary item in human life, hundreds of workers were used to obtain the salt, including numerous slaves. Some of these workers began settling on 150 acres (0.61 km^{2}) of James F. Moore's land, causing the charter in 1794 for the new town of Newtown. It was sold under numerous brands, most prominently Little Sandy Salt. The salt was considered excellent quality, prized by merchants, and was sold as far away as Lexington, Kentucky. In 1808 it was sold for $2–2.25 a bushel, although it was often traded for such goods as hemp, linen, and tobacco. At its height the salt works was operated 24 hours a day.

Eventually, the salt lick went out of business, as it was not as big as other nearby salt licks, such as Bullitt's Lick, and steamboats brought cheaper salt to Louisville. By 1830 the population and salt had dwindled, and by 1890 a change in Kentucky's constitution caused Newtown to officially dissolve.

The area had attained a negative reputation by Louisvillians between 1830 and 1910. From 1830 to 1860 there were various battles over who owned the land. In 1844 it was given to Margaret W. Preston, as she was the favorite stepdaughter of her father's (William Preston) wife, Polly Wickliffe. In 1870 an attempt to find oil on the land was made by the Manslick Petroleum Company. Margaret W. Preston would continue to own the land through the 1880s as she saw it as "the gift of the best friend I ever had on earth", referring to her stepmother. In 1886 it had become part of the land for a natural gas company. By 1910 new residents came to the area. As they were unaware of the site's history, they gave it a new name, Fairdale, instead of its old name of Newtown.

The name lives on, as Manslick Road attained its name from the former salt lick.
