= 2024 Kentucky Democratic presidential primary =

- May 21, 2024

59 delegates (53 pledged, 6 unpledged) to the Democratic National Convention

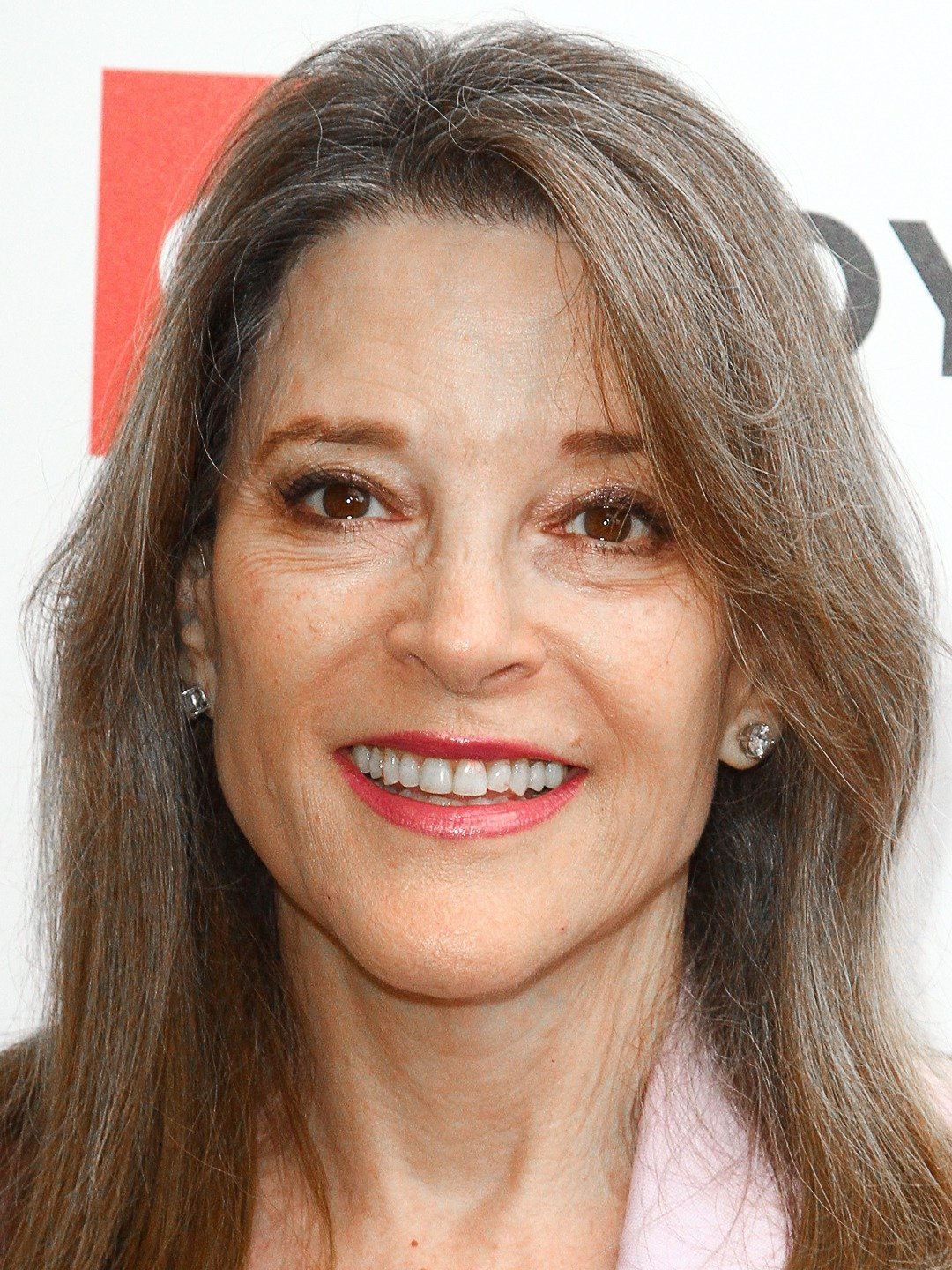
| Candidate | Joe Biden | Uncommitted | Marianne Williamson |
| Home state | Delaware | – | Washington, D.C. |
| Delegate count | 45 | 8 | 0 |
| Popular vote | 131,449 | 32,908 | 11,190 |
| Percentage | 71.3% | 17.9% | 6.1% |

Biden
30–40%
40–50%
50–60%
60–70%
70–80%
80–90%
Uncommitted
30–40%
40–50%

The 2024 Kentucky Democratic presidential primary was held on May 21, 2024, as part of the Democratic Party primaries for the 2024 presidential election, alongside Oregon's and two days before Idaho's primary. 53 delegates to the Democratic National Convention were allocated in the closed primary, with 6 additional unpledged delegates.

Incumbent president Joe Biden won with over 70%, but the option for uncommitted votes received 17.9% of the vote and 8 delegates, which was the second best delegate result and third best vote result overall for the Uncommitted Movement. Biden won a plurality of the vote in all counties except Ballard, Breathitt, Floyd, Knott, Robertson, Union, and Wolfe Counties, which were won by the Uncommitted Movement.

== Candidates ==
The following candidates were certified for the ballot by the Secretary of State of Kentucky:

- Joe Biden
- Dean Phillips (withdrawn)
- Marianne Williamson

Additionally, a ballot option for uncommitted delegates was included.

== Results ==
Kentucky Democratic primary, May 21, 2024
| Candidate | Votes | % | Delegates |
|---|---|---|---|
| Joe Biden (incumbent) | 131,449 | 71.33 | 45 |
| Uncommitted | 32,908 | 17.86 | 8 |
| Marianne Williamson | 11,190 | 6.07 | 0 |
| Dean Phillips (withdrawn) | 8,744 | 4.74 | 0 |
| Total | 184,291 | 100% | 53 |

=== Results by congressional district ===
| District | Biden | "Uncommitted" | Williamson | Phillips |
|---|---|---|---|---|
| 1st | 61.1% | 25.3% | 6.9% | 6.8% |
| 2nd | 69.4% | 18.3% | 6.9% | 5.4% |
| 3rd | 82.1% | 10.8% | 4.8% | 2.4% |
| 4th | 67.9% | 19.3% | 7.2% | 5.6% |
| 5th | 52.6% | 30.3% | 7.4% | 9.7% |
| 6th | 75.4% | 15.5% | 5.6% | 3.5% |

== See also ==
- 2024 Kentucky Republican presidential caucuses
- 2024 Democratic Party presidential primaries
- 2024 United States presidential election
- 2024 United States presidential election in Kentucky
- 2024 United States elections
- 2024 Kentucky elections
