= Plug-in electric vehicles in Kentucky =

As of April 2022, there were about 3,700 electric vehicles registered in Kentucky.

== Government policy ==
As of January 2022, the state government does not offer any tax incentives for electric vehicle purchases.

The state is scheduled to implement a $120 registration fee for electric vehicles starting in January 2024.

A website compiling Kentucky state government efforts to progress electric vehicle adoption and educate citizens on electric vehicle technologies was launched as KY EV Charging, in a joint effort by the Kentucky Transportation Cabinet and the Kentucky Energy and Environment Cabinet.

== Charging stations ==
As of January 2022, there were 210 public charging stations in Kentucky.

The Infrastructure Investment and Jobs Act, signed into law in November 2021, allocates US$70 million to charging stations in Kentucky.

== Manufacturing ==
Kentucky has been widely proposed as a hub for electric vehicle manufacturing.

== By region ==
=== Louisville ===
As of July 2019, there were 2,737 electric vehicles in Louisville.
