= Greenhouse gas emissions in Kentucky =

This article is intended to give an overview of the greenhouse gas emissions in the U.S. state of Kentucky.

== Greenhouse gas inventory ==
The report "Kentucky Greenhouse Gas Inventory" provides a detailed inventory of greenhouse gas emissions and sinks for Kentucky in 1990. Emissions were estimated using methods from EPA's 1995 guidance document State Workbook: Methodologies for Estimating Greenhouse Gas Emissions. In 1990, Kentucky emitted 35.4 million metric tons of carbon equivalent (MMTCE). In addition, Kentucky estimated emissions of 0.4 MMTCE from biofuels. Emissions from biofuels are not included.

The principal of greenhouse gases were carbon dioxide, comprising 87.9 million metric tons (24.0 MMTCE), and methane, with 1.1 million metric tons (6.4 MMTCE). Other emissions included 0.0016 million metric tons of perfluorocarbons (PFCs) (4.8 MMTCE), and 0.003 million metric tons of nitrous oxide (0.2 MMTCE).

The major source of carbon dioxide emissions was fossil fuel combustion (96%), the majority of which is utility coal. Minor emissions came from cement and lime production and forest/grassland conversion. Carbon dioxide sinks (i.e., an increase in forest carbon storage) offset about 26% of the total carbon dioxide emissions.

Sources of methane emissions were coal mining (73%), domesticated animals (12%), landfills (10%), manure management (3%), and natural gas/oil extraction (2%).

Nitrous oxide emissions were from fertilizer use. Sources of perfluorocarbons were HCFC-22 production (91%) and aluminum production (9%).

Compared to the 1990 U.S. emissions of 6.4 MTCE per capita, Kentucky's emissions were 9.6 MTCE per person. Due to the substantial amount of coal-related activities taking place in Kentucky, the state has high emissions per person.

== Coal-seam fires ==
A great deal of greenhouse gas emissions and toxic pollutants in Kentucky originate in coal-seam fires. These can continue to burn for hundreds of years due to the low supply of oxygen leading to a slow rate of skin burns.

Coal-seam fires in Kentucky include the Truman Shepherd fire in Floyd and Knott counties (1400 t/yr CO_{2} in 2010), the Ruth Mullins fire in Perry County (726 t/yr CO_{2} in 2010), the Old Smokey fire in Floyd County, The Truman Shepherd fire was brought down to less than 66 t/yr CO_{2} by 2013 through mitigating actions.

== Carbon-dioxide storage ==
Carbon sequestration is the process of injecting carbon-dioxide into geological formations in order to store it and prevent it entering the atmosphere. Pumping carbon-dioxide into geological formations has been done in the oil industry for some time for the purpose of extracting oil. For this reason the technology is considered proven, at least as far as the physical pumping is concerned. Unmineable coal seams are one possible formation that could be used for this purpose. As of 2010, there are plans to conduct a feasibility study in conjunction with the Kentucky Geological Survey. The Kentucky Carbon Storage Foundation will drill the test well. The facility is intended to serve a coal gasification plant planned by Peabody Energy and ConocoPhillips.

In 2020, Kentucky power plants were emitting 53,725,429 tons of carbon dioxide into the air.
