= 2024 Kentucky Republican presidential primary =

- May 21, 2024

46 Republican National Convention delegates

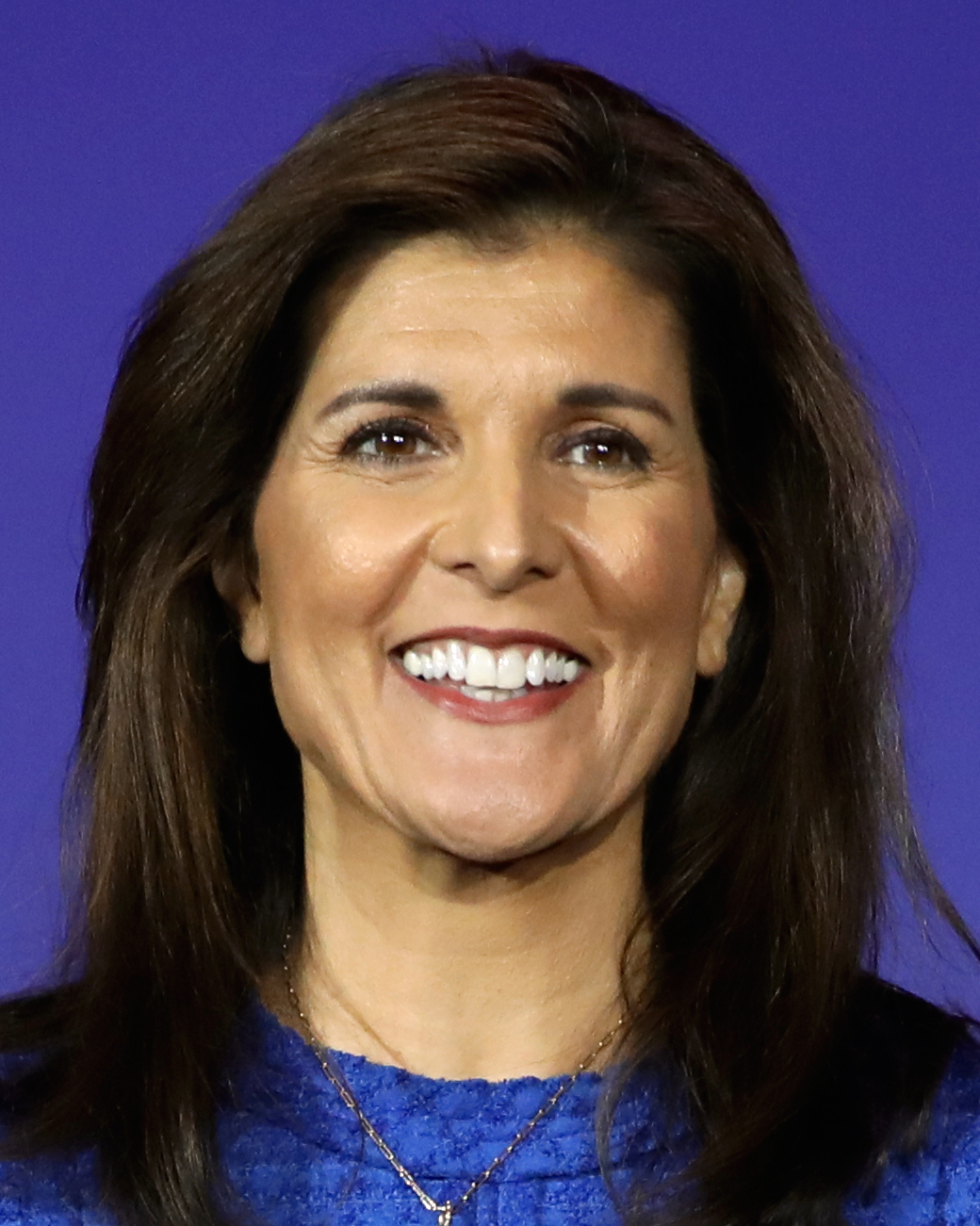
Candidate	Donald Trump	Nikki Haley (withdrawn)
Home state	Florida	South Carolina
Delegate count	46	0
Popular vote	215,044	16,232
Percentage	85.0%	6.4%

Trump
60–70%
70–80%
80–90%
>90%

The 2024 Kentucky Republican presidential primary was held on May 21, 2024, as part of the Republican Party primaries for the 2024 presidential election. 46 delegates to the 2024 Republican National Convention will be allocated on a proportional basis. The contest was held alongside the Oregon primary.

== Endorsements ==
Chris Christie (withdrawn)

Federal officials

- Kelly Craft, U.S. Ambassador to the United Nations (2019–2021); U.S. Ambassador to Canada (2017–2019); Alternate U.S. Delegate to the United Nations (2007–2008); Republican candidate for Governor in 2023 (switched from Donald Trump) (co-endorsed with Mike Pence and Vivek Ramaswamy)
Ron DeSantis (withdrawn)

Federal officials

- Scott Jennings, Deputy White House Director of Political Affairs (2005–2007); Special Assistant to the U.S. President (2005–2007)

U.S. Representatives

- Thomas Massie, KY-04 (2012–present)
Mike Pence (withdrawn)

Federal officials

- Kelly Craft, U.S. Ambassador to the United Nations (2019–2021); U.S. Ambassador to Canada (2017–2019); Alternate U.S. Delegate to the United Nations (2007–2008); Republican candidate for Governor in 2023 (switched from Donald Trump) (co-endorsed with Chris Christie and Vivek Ramaswamy)
Vivek Ramaswamy (withdrawn)

Federal officials

- Kelly Craft, U.S. Ambassador to the United Nations (2019–2021); U.S. Ambassador to Canada (2017–2019); Alternate U.S. Delegate to the United Nations (2007–2008); Republican candidate for Governor in 2023 (switched from Donald Trump) (co-endorsed with Chris Christie and Mike Pence)
Donald Trump

Federal officials

- ~~Kelly Craft, U.S. Ambassador to the United Nations (2019–2021); U.S. Ambassador to Canada (2017–2019); Alternate U.S. Delegate to the United Nations (2007–2008); Republican candidate for Governor in 2023~~ (switched endorsement to Chris Christie, Mike Pence, and Vivek Ramaswamy)

U.S. Senators

- ~~Mitch McConnell, (1985–present); Minority Leader (2021–present) and (2007–2015); Majority Leader (2015–2021); and Majority Whip (2003–2007)~~(endorsement rejected by Trump)

U.S. Representatives

- Andy Barr, KY-06 (2013–present)

State executive officials

- Daniel Cameron, Attorney General (2019–2024); Republican nominee for Governor in 2023
- Mike Harmon, State Auditor (2016–present)

State representatives

- Allen Maricle, District 49 (1995–1998)
Declined to endorse

U.S. Senators

- Rand Paul, (2011–present); candidate for president in 2016

== Results ==
Kentucky Republican primary, May 21, 2024
Candidate	Votes	Percentage	Actual delegate count		
Candidate	Votes	Percentage	Bound	Unbound	Total
Donald Trump	215,044	85.0%	46		46
Nikki Haley (withdrawn)	16,232	6.4%			
Uncommitted	8,984	3.5%			
Ron DeSantis (withdrawn)	7,803	3.1%			
Chris Christie (withdrawn)	2,461	1.0%			
Vivek Ramaswamy (withdrawn)	1,640	0.7%			
Ryan Binkley (withdrawn)	900	0.4%			
Total:	253,064	100.0%	46		46

== Polling ==
Poll source	Date(s) administered	Sample size	Margin of error	Chris Christie	Ron DeSantis	Nikki Haley	Asa Hutchinson	Mike Pence	Vivek Ramaswamy	Tim Scott	Donald Trump	Other	Undecided
Emerson College	May 10–12, 2023	500 (LV)	± 4.3%	2%	14%	3%	0%	4%	3%	1%	70%	3% (Note: Chris Sununu with 0%; "Someone else" with 3%)	–
Emerson College	Apr 10–11, 2023	900 (LV)	± 3.0%	–	23%	4%	1%	4%	–	1%	62%	6% (Note: Kristi Noem with 1%; "Someone else" with 5%)	–

== See also ==
- 2024 Kentucky Democratic presidential primary
- 2024 Republican Party presidential primaries
- 2024 United States presidential election
- 2024 United States presidential election in Kentucky
- 2024 United States elections
