= List of bridges documented by the Historic American Engineering Record in Kentucky =

This is a list of bridges documented by the Historic American Engineering Record in the U.S. state of Kentucky.

== Bridges ==
Survey No.	Name (as assigned by HAER)	Status	Type	Built	Documented	Carries	Crosses	Location	County	Coordinates
KY-2	North Fork Bridge	Replaced	Pratt truss	1883	1983	KY 539	North Fork of Licking River	Milford	Bracken	38°34′51″N 84°09′58″W
KY-3	Starnes Bridge	Replaced	Pennsylvania truss	1890	1983	KY 1993	Eagle Creek	Holbrook	Grant	38°35′00″N 84°40′48″W
KY-4	Boldman Bridge	Replaced	Suspension	1935	1984	KY 1384	Levisa Fork	Pikeville	Pike	37°31′53″N 82°37′07″W
KY-5	U.S. 23 Middle Bridge	Demolished	Parker truss	1908	1984	US 23	Levisa Fork	Pikeville	Pike	37°28′47″N 82°30′57″W
KY-6	Mitchell-Griggs Road Bridge	Replaced	Warren truss	1883	1983	Mitchell-Griggs Road	Caney Fork	Dixon	Webster	37°32′18″N 87°49′19″W
KY-7	Suger Creek Bridge	Replaced	Pratt truss	1894	1983	KY 124	Sugar Creek	Hopkinsville	Christian	36°59′47″N 87°41′5″W
KY-8	Kentucky Route 762 Bridge	Replaced	Pratt truss	1897	1983	KY 762	South Fork of Panther Creek	Owensboro	Daviess	37°37′41″N 86°56′37″W
KY-10	Big Four Bridge	Extant	Baltimore truss	1929	1984	Cleveland, Cincinnati, Chicago and St. Louis Railway (former)	Ohio River	Louisville, Kentucky, and Jeffersonville, Indiana	Jefferson County, Kentucky, and Clark County, Indiana	38°15′56″N 85°44′20″W
KY-12	Pine Street Bridge	Replaced	Reinforced concrete open-spandrel arch	1929	1985	KY 66 (Pine Street)	Cumberland River	Pineville	Bell	36°45′52″N 83°41′36″W
KY-13	Red Bridge	Bypassed	Pratt truss	1896		KY 1005	North Benson Creek	Frankfort	Franklin	38°12′29″N 84°56′14″W
KY-14	Kentucky Route 840 Bridge	Demolished	Baltimore truss	1924		KY 840	Cumberland River	Loyall	Harlan	36°50′49″N 83°21′21″W
KY-15	Kentucky Route 708 Bridge	Replaced	Pratt truss	1917		KY 708	Middle Fork of Kentucky River	Tallega	Lee	37°33′18″N 83°35′38″W
KY-16	Williamsburg Bridge	Replaced	Pennsylvania truss	1890	1987	KY 296	Cumberland River	Williamsburg	Whitley	36°44′39″N 84°09′28″W
KY-17	Kentucky Route 49 Bridge	Replaced	Whipple truss	1881	1984	KY 49	Rolling Fork	Bradfordsville	Marion	37°29′43″N 85°08′54″W
KY-20; OH-28	Covington and Cincinnati Suspension Bridge	Extant	Suspension	1867	1987	KY 17	Ohio River	Covington, Kentucky, and Cincinnati, Ohio	Kenton County, Kentucky, and Hamilton County, Ohio	39°05′32″N 84°30′34″W
KY-21	Kentucky Route 228 Bridge	Replaced	Whipple truss	1885	1987	KY 228	Wolf Creek	Wolf Creek	Meade	38°06′24″N 86°23′22″W
KY-22	Kentucky Route 1754 Bridge	Replaced	Parker truss	1910	1984	KY 1754	Chaplin River	Chaplin	Nelson	37°53′28″N 85°11′58″W
KY-23	Kentucky Route 478 Bridge	Replaced	Warren truss	1907	1987	KY 478	Jellico Creek	Williamsburg	Whitley	36°44′44″N 84°15′57″W
KY-24	Kentucky Route 2014 Bridge	Replaced	Warren truss	1873	1987	KY 2014	Cumberland River	Pineville	Bell	39°05′46″N 84°30′04″W
KY-25	Kentucky State Route 1032 Bridge	Replaced	Pratt truss	1906	1987	KY 1032	South Fork of Licking River	Berry	Harrison	38°31′14″N 84°23′10″W
KY-27	Kentucky Route 5272 Bridge	Relocated	Pratt truss	1880	1989	KY 5272	Whippoorwill Creek	Lickskillet	Logan	36°51′43.0″N 86°42′22.6″W
KY-28	U.S. Route 27 Central Bridge	Replaced	Cantilever	1890	1989	US 27	Ohio River	Newport, Kentucky, and Cincinnati, Ohio	Campbell County, Kentucky, and Hamilton County, Ohio	39°05′46″N 84°30′04″W
KY-29	Kentucky 1013 Bridge	Replaced	Pratt truss	1893	1990	KY 1013	Sand Lick Creek	Plummers Landing	Fleming	38°19′02″N 83°34′42″W
KY-30	James Bethel Gresham Memorial Bridge	Replaced	Parker truss	1928	1999	KY 81	Green River	Calhoun	McLean	37°32′04″N 87°15′39″W
KY-31	Andrew J. Sullivan Bridge	Replaced	Reinforced concrete closed-spandrel arch	1928	2000	KY 904	Cumberland River	Williamsburg	Whitley	36°44′27″N 84°06′12″W
KY-36	Hopewell Bridge	Extant	Whipple truss	1868	1987	KY 3306	Little Sandy River (Kentucky)	Hopewell	Greenup	38°24′29.4″N 82°54′19.9″W
KY-37	High Bridge	Extant	Baltimore truss	1911	1987	Cincinnati Southern Railway	Kentucky River	High Bridge	Jessamine and Mercer	37°49′02″N 84°43′12″W
KY-49	Bennett's Covered Bridge	Extant	Wheeler truss	1874	2004	CR 1215 (East Tygart's Creek Road)	Tygarts Creek	Lynn	Greenup	38°37′50″N 82°55′37″W
KY-50	Kentucky Route 36 Bridge	Replaced	Reinforced concrete closed-spandrel arch	1922	1989	KY 36	Lick Fork Creek	Williamstown	Grant	38°34′05″N 84°31′17″W
KY-51	Kentucky 1804 Bridge	Replaced	Parker truss	1917	1986	KY 1084	Clear Fork Creek	Saxton	Whitley	36°38′03″N 84°06′50″W
KY-53	US 421 Milton-Madison Bridge	Replaced	Cantilever	1929	2010	US 421	Ohio River	Milton, Kentucky, and Madison, Indiana	Trimble County, Kentucky, and Jefferson County, Indiana	38°43′45″N 85°22′12″W
OH-27	Chesapeake & Ohio Railroad Bridge	Extant	Cantilever	1929	1982	Chesapeake and Ohio Railway	Ohio River	Covington, Kentucky, and Cincinnati, Ohio	Kenton County, Kentucky, and Hamilton County, Ohio	39°05′29″N 84°31′11″W
