= Pine Mountain State Resort Park =

State park in Kentucky, United States

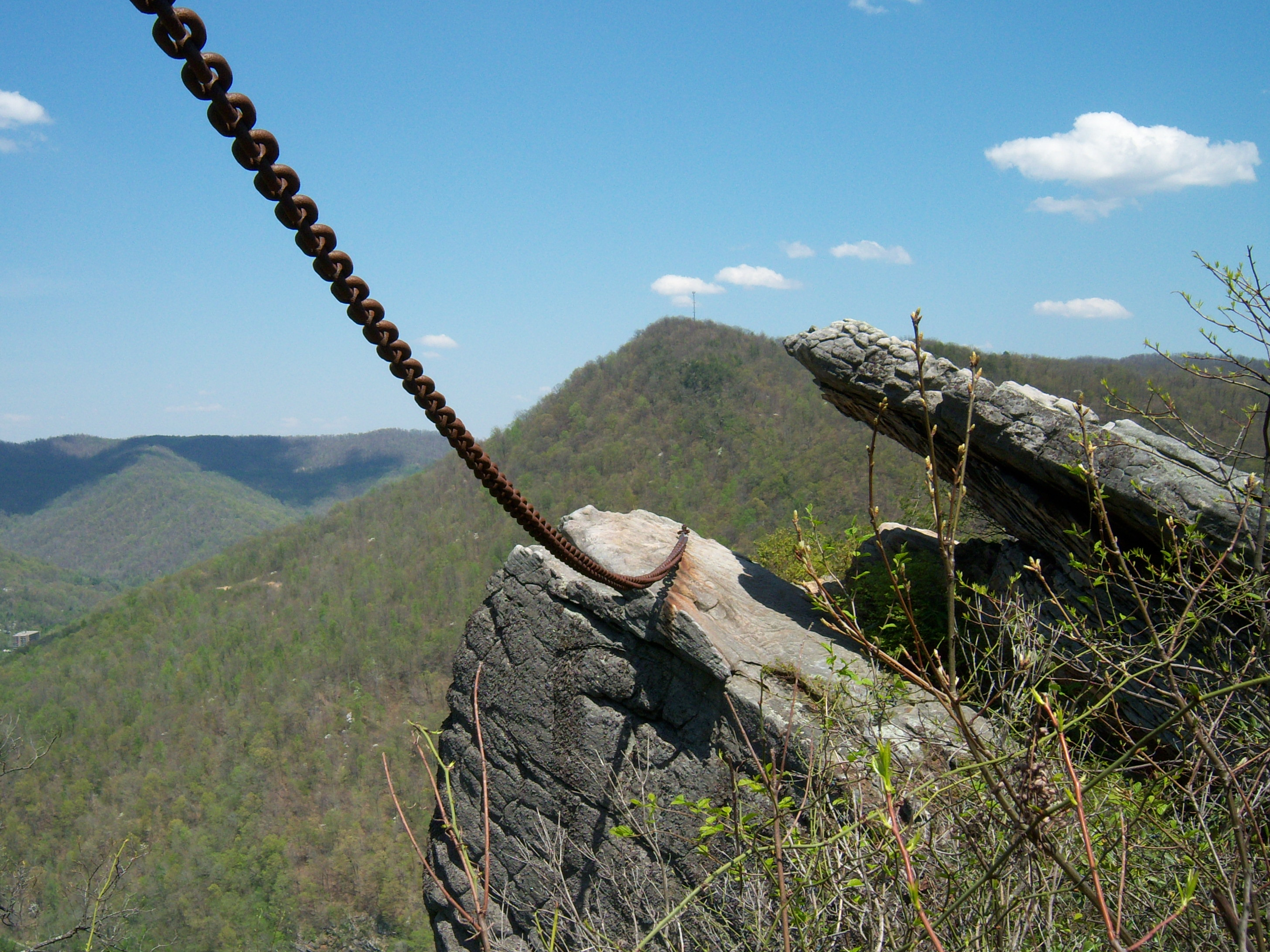
- Chained Rock

- Location within Kentucky Location within the United States
- Type: Kentucky state park
- Location: Bell County, Kentucky, United States
- Coordinates: 36°44′08″N 83°44′15″W
- Area: 1,519 acres (615 ha)
- Established: 1924
- Administrator: Kentucky Department of Parks
- Website: Official website

Pine Mountain State Resort Park is a public recreation area located in Bell County, southeastern Kentucky, United States. Located on part of the Pine Mountain ridge in the Appalachians, the state park opened in 1924 as Kentucky's first state park. The park has hosted the annual Kentucky Mountain Laurel Festival since 1933. A portion of the park is legally dedicated as a nature preserve by the Office of Kentucky Nature Preserves.

== History ==
When Pine Mountain State Resort Park was established in 1926, it was named Cumberland State Park. The name was changed in 1938 to avoid confusion with the newly formed Cumberland Falls State Resort Park. In 1933, the Civilian Conservation Corps began constructing the main office building, cabins, roads, bridges, shelters, and hiking trails. In the 1960s, the Kentucky State Park System built a new wing for the lodge, 10 additional cottages, swimming pool, and golf course.

== Lore ==
During the 1930s, the people of Pineville, Kentucky decided to create a new tourist attraction. In 1933, a group hauled a 101-foot-long chain to the top of Pine Mountain and attached it to a massive boulder that loomed above the town. They said the rock was chained to the mountain in order to keep it from rolling down the mountain and destroying the city.

== Activities and amenities ==
Park offerings include a lodge, restaurant, 18-hole golf course, cottages built by the CCC in the 1930s and cabins built in the 1970s.
