= Kentucky Route 2014 Bridge =

Kentucky Route 2014 Bridge Bridge No. 007B00129N
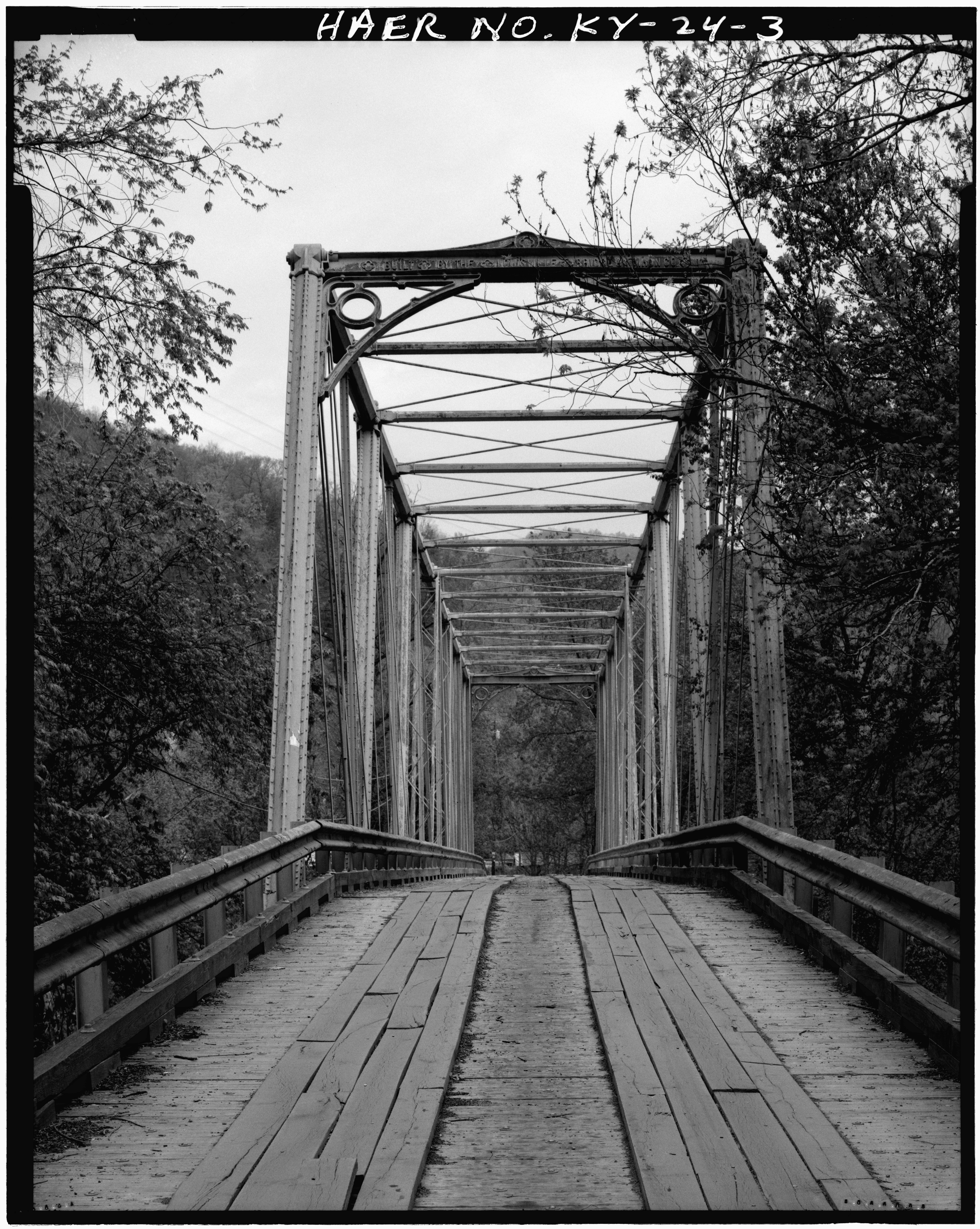
- HAER image looking from the southwest
- Coordinates: 36.7923°N 83.743°W
- Carries: 1 lane of KY 2014
- Crosses: Cumberland River
- Locale: near Pineville, Kentucky
- Official name: Kentucky Route 2014 Bridge
- Maintained by: Kentucky Transportation Cabinet
- ID number: 007B00129N

Characteristics
- Design: Warren through truss
- Total length: 328 feet (100 m)
- No. of spans: 1
- Load limit: 15 tons
- Clearance above: 22 feet 6 inches (6.86 m)

History
- Designer: Louisville Bridge and Iron Company and Phoenix Iron Company of Pennsylvania
- Construction end: 1873
- Opened: 1873
- Closed: 1993

Statistics
- Toll: none

The Kentucky Route 2014 Bridge along Kentucky Route 2014 in Bell County, Kentucky, was a truss bridge spanning the Cumberland River near Pineville, Kentucky. The bridge was 328 feet (100 m) long. The bridge was a Warren through truss bridge and one of the early styles of the bridge. The bridge was constructed in 1873 by the Louisville Bridge and Iron Company of Louisville, Kentucky, and the Phoenix Iron Company of Pennsylvania and subsequently maintained by the Kentucky Transportation Cabinet. Its vertical clearance was 22 feet 6 inches (6.86 m) and could hold a limit of 15 tons of traffic.

== History ==
The Kentucky Route 2014 Bridge was constructed mostly by the Louisville Bridge and Iron Company; Phoenix Iron Company supplied the Phoenix columns used on the bridge, which were patented in 1862. The bridge was not structurally safe for some time prior to its replacement in 1993. It was found eligible for the National Register of Historic Places and only one of two constructed by the Louisville Bridge and Iron Company in Kentucky. The Route 2014 Bridge, when constructed in 1873, proved to be a large and good example of its construction.

The bridge, which served people in rural areas around Pineville, was rated a 38.3 out of 100 points in a May 1, 1987, survey, which also included the 15-ton limit. A lot of the 70 historic bridges spread throughout Kentucky are either Pratt or Warren through trusses, the two most popular kinds of trusses. The Kentucky Route 2014 Bridge, along with others built in the early nineteenth century, represented an early style of bridge construction.

== Bridge details ==
The Kentucky Route 2014 Bridge was located about 3 miles (4.8 km) west of Pineville and spanned the Cumberland River, which is one part of the major drainage system in southern Kentucky. The bridge's main span over the river was 208 feet (63 m) long, but adding the approaches, its total length was 328 feet (100 m). Three I-beam spans, each about 30 feet (9.1 m) long, supported the southern approach, while the northern approach was only supported by two.

The horizontal clearance of the Kentucky Route 2014 Bridge was 15 feet (4.6 m) and its vertical clearance was 22 feet 6 inches (6.86 m). The bridge was known for its unique top chord, which was created through a sectional, eight-sided cast iron columns bolted at each point. The bridge also had unusual flooring made out of pin-connected wood truss beams, which provided greater strength with lighter weight.

== See also ==
- List of bridges documented by the Historic American Engineering Record in Kentucky
- List of state highways in Kentucky
- Bell County, Kentucky
