= The Eternal Sea =

1955 film by John H. Auer

- Film soundtrack LP
- Directed by: John H. Auer
- Written by: Allen Rivkin; William Wister Haines; Luther Davis
- Produced by: John H. Auer
- Starring: Sterling Hayden; Alexis Smith; Ben Cooper; Dean Jagger
- Cinematography: John L. Russell
- Edited by: Fred Allen
- Music by: Elmer Bernstein
- Production company: Republic Pictures
- Distributed by: Republic Pictures
- Release dates: April 20, 1955 (Providence, Rhode Island); May 5, 1955 (United States)
- Running time: 103 minutes
- Country: United States
- Language: English

The Eternal Sea (aka The Admiral Hoskins Story) is a 1955 American biographical war film directed by John H. Auer and starring Sterling Hayden, Alexis Smith and Ben Cooper. The film follows the career of Captain John Hoskins, who loses his leg at the Battle of Leyte Gulf and resists attempts to retire him and continues his military service after learning to cope with his disability. He goes on to be promoted to admiral and commands an aircraft carrier during the Korean War.

The Eternal Sea was one of a number of more ambitious productions by Republic Pictures, which had traditionally made low-budget second features. Its release was undermined by the studio's growing financial problems which led to its eventual closure in 1959.

== Plot ==
In 1942, newly promoted Capt. John Madison Hoskins returns home after two years at sea to spend a seven-hour leave with his wife Sue and their children, before taking command of the aircraft carrier USS Hornet (CV-8). However, he receives news that the ship has been sunk at the Battle of the Santa Cruz Islands. Hoskins is then reassigned as an instructor at Quonset Point, Rhode Island, much closer to home but "... thousands of miles from the only war he'll get to fight in."

Two years later, after teaching some of the US Navy's top students, Hoskins is given command of the aircraft carrier USS Princeton (CVL-23) but its present commander, Capt. William Buracker is retained for the Second Philippine Campaign. During the Battle of Leyte Gulf, the ship is severely crippled and Buracker orders her to be scuttled. Hoskins is severely wounded, and following the onset of gangrene his foot is amputated to save his life. He is transferred using Breeches buoy to a hospital ship.

On the hospital ship, Hoskins meets "Zuggy", another amputee who lost an arm and is being honorably discharged. He phones his wife to tell her he is okay, saying he has "cured" his athlete's foot. Back in the US after landing at San Francisco he flies home to Philadelphia.

His disability makes Hoskins eligible for retirement with the automatic rank of rear admiral, but he pushes himself to be ready to take command of the new Essex-class aircraft carrier USS Princeton (CV-37) being built in the nearby Navy shipyard. Initially Sue is very upset with this decision. Vice-Adm. Thomas L. Semple reveals that according to Navy code, no disabled officer can be compelled to retire.

Hoskins clambers around the scaffolding building the new carrier on a daily basis. One day he falls from the scaffolding and breaks his false leg. He remains unable to walk without crutches. Although injured, he comes into his review meeting, two days after the accident, without crutches, convincing the tribunal that he is fit to serve. Semple, who knows he is still using crutches, tries to convince him to retire rather than being found unfit to serve. The board tell him their decision will take some time and he is asked to leave. The next day, at the launching of the USS Princeton, Hoskins is assigned as its commander. Much to his surprise this is announced in the middle of the launching ceremony. In his speech, he promises to avenge the loss of the earlier Princeton (CVL-23).

On the ship he takes Zuggy as his assistant. He plans to start landing jets on the aircraft carrier, using catapults for launch and stronger wires to catch them on landing.

After the war, Hoskins advocates for the use of jet aircraft off aircraft carriers and when he is transferred to San Diego, he is able to demonstrate the capabilities of jets to land on carrier ships. Despite one jet crashing due to mechanical failure, the US Navy is convinced of the viability of jet operations.

Assigned to the carrier division for aircraft operation at sea, Hoskins joins Adm. Arthur Dewey Struble (Morris Ankrum) of the 7th Fleet. Senior naval men arrive to see the first demonstration of jets landing on an aircraft carrier. Hoskins puts his money where his mouth his and personally flies the lead jet. He and one other pilot perform a brief aerobatic display before landing. Hoskins demonstrates that jets can be used safely on aircraft carriers. After the display he is given command of the 7th Fleet, and the Korean War begins soon after. The crew are very fond of him and nickname him "Uncle John".

After celebrating his wedding anniversary with Sue, Hoskins is offered the choice of two important jobs which could each further his career, but which would take him away from active duty. Discouraged by this prospect, when he witnesses the return of wounded men from the Korean front, Hoskins is inspired to show the injured men that they can still lead an active life and turns down both jobs, asking instead to be put in charge of the Pacific Division of the Air Transport Service. He therefore places himself as a high-ranking advocate for disabled veterans.

He tells Sue "just one more job".

== Cast ==
- Sterling Hayden as Rear-Adm. John Madison Hoskins
- Alexis Smith as Sue Hoskins
- Ben Cooper as Seaman P.J. "Zuggy" Zugbaum
- Dean Jagger as Vice-Adm. Thomas L. Semple
- Virginia Grey as Dorothy Buracker
- Hayden Rorke as Capt. William Buracker
- Douglas Kennedy as Capt. Walter Riley
- Louis Jean Heydt as Capt. Walter F. Rodee
- Richard Crane as Lt. Johnson
- Morris Ankrum as Vice-Adm. Arthur Dewey Struble
- Frank Ferguson as Admiral L.D.
- John Maxwell as Adm. William F. "Bull" Halsey
- William Kerwin as Cole

== Production ==
Among other locations, The Eternal Sea was filmed from October 7 to late October, 1954, at the USS Kearsarge (CV-33) while on a "Show The Flag" cruise around Asia. Support from the US Navy was also in the form of the loan of Douglas AD-1 Skyraider, Grumman F9F Panther aircraft and Piasecki HUP-2 Retriever helicopter. Other aircraft that were seen, include Korean wounded disembarking from MATS aircraft, a Douglas C-54 Skymaster and a Boeing C-97 Stratofreighter. Use of documentary film from World War II was also evident.

The naval battle scenes, including multiple shots of planes being shot down, is true documentary footage from the Pacific War rather than special effects. The launch of the USS Princeton is also taken from documentary footage.

== Reception ==
Writing in The New York Times, film critic Howard Thompson wrote, "as an unpretentiously engrossing tribute to a man's unpretentious realism and courage, it could hardly be more appealing," adding that the film contains, "some of the best and most unobtrusive photography of aircraft carrier scenes ever made. "

The Eternal Sea was an attempt by Republic Pictures studio head Herbert J. Yates to add a high quality production to the usual output of low budget features. The studio promotion "breathlessly" highlighted: "Hollywood Now Brings You a Story of Heroic Greatness...; Inspired by the depths of a woman's love! and The real-life Naval Hero who defied disaster - to soar his jet to glory!"

With production costs increasing, Yates organized Republic's output into four types of films: "Jubilee", usually a western shot in seven days for about $50,000; "Anniversary", filmed in 14 to 15 days for $175,000 to $200,000; "Deluxe", major productions made with a budget of around $500,000; and "Premiere", which were usually made by top-rank directors who did not usually work for Republic, such as John Ford, Fritz Lang and Frank Borzage, and which could have a budget of $1,000,000 or more. Some of these "Deluxe" films were from independent production companies that were picked up for release by Republic.

== See also ==
- List of American films of 1955
