= USS Bennington (CV-20) =

Essex-class aircraft carrier of the US Navy

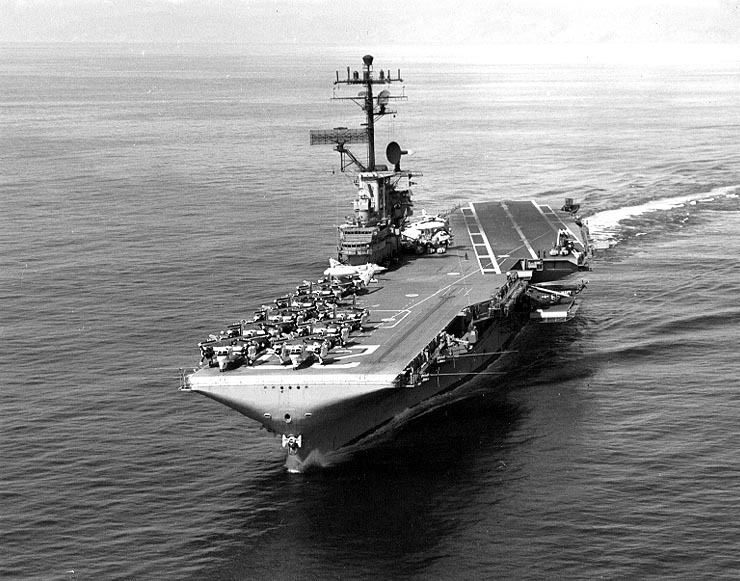
- USS Bennington as an ASW-carrier on 5 March 1965

History

United States
- Name: Bennington
- Namesake: Battle of Bennington
- Ordered: 15 December 1941
- Builder: New York Naval Shipyard
- Laid down: 15 December 1942
- Launched: 28 February 1944
- Commissioned: 6 August 1944
- Decommissioned: 8 November 1946
- Recommissioned: 13 November 1952
- Decommissioned: 15 January 1970
- Reclassified: CVA-20, 1 October 1952; CVS-20, 30 June 1959
- Stricken: 20 September 1989
- Fate: Scrapped, 12 January 1994

General characteristics (as built)
- Displacement: 27,100 long tons (27,500 t) (standard); 36,380 long tons (36,960 t) (full load)
- Length: 820 feet (249.9 m) (wl); 872 feet (265.8 m) (o/a)
- Beam: 93 ft (28.3 m)
- Draft: 34 ft 2 in (10.41 m)
- Installed power: 8 × Babcock & Wilcox boilers; 150,000 shp (110,000 kW)
- Propulsion: 4 × geared steam turbines; 4 × screw propellers
- Speed: 33 knots (61 km/h; 38 mph)
- Range: 14,100 nmi (26,100 km; 16,200 mi) at 20 knots (37 km/h; 23 mph)
- Complement: 2,600 officers and enlisted men
- Armament: 12 × 5 in (127 mm) DP guns; 32 × 40 mm (1.6 in) AA guns; 46 × 20 mm (0.8 in) AA guns
- Armor: Waterline belt: 2.5–4 in (64–102 mm); Deck: 1.5 in (38 mm); Hangar deck: 2.5 in (64 mm); Bulkheads: 4 in (102 mm)
- Aircraft carried: 36 × Grumman F6F Hellcat; 36 × Douglas SBD Dauntless; 18 × Grumman TBF Avenger

USS Bennington (CV/CVA/CVS-20) was an Essex-class aircraft carrier in service with the United States Navy from 1944 to 1946 and from 1952 to 1970. She was sold for scrap in 1994.

== Service history ==
=== World War II ===
USS Bennington was named for a battle in 1777 near Bennington, Vermont, during the American Revolutionary War, in which American victory contributed to the ultimate defeat of General Burgoyne at Saratoga. The carrier was laid down on 15 December 1942 by the New York Naval Shipyard and launched on 26 February 1944, sponsored by the wife of Congressman Melvin Maas of Minnesota. She was commissioned on 6 August 1944.

Bennington completed trials, shakedown training, and post-shakedown availability by 14 December when she departed New York and headed for the Pacific theater. She transited the Panama Canal on 21 December and moored at San Diego on the 29th. On New Year's Day 1945, the carrier stood out of San Diego to continue her voyage west. She arrived in Pearl Harbor, Hawaii, on 7 January. For the remainder of the month, she conducted air and gunnery training in the Hawaiian operating area. On 1 February, Bennington exited Pearl Harbor in company with the aircraft carriers USS Belleau Wood, USS Bunker Hill, USS Randolph, USS Saratoga and the large cruiser USS Alaska to join Task Force 58 at Ulithi Atoll in the Caroline Islands.

==== Operations off Iwo Jima ====
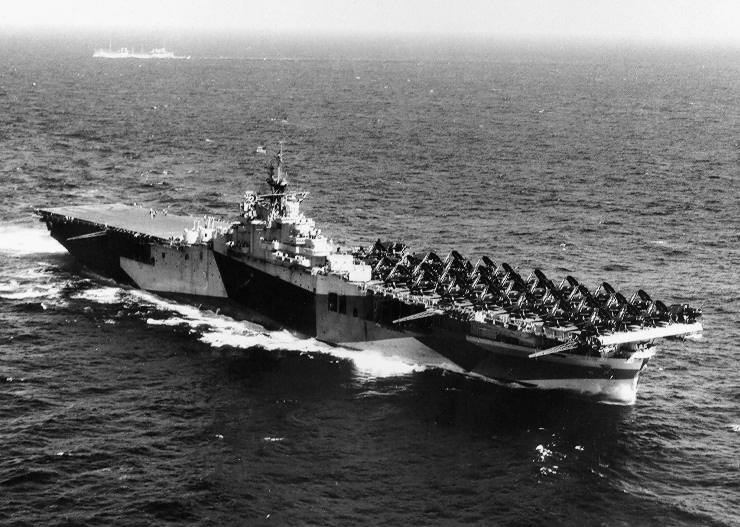
Bennington in her original configuration, 1944.

She arrived in Ulithi lagoon on 8 February and became a unit of Task Group (TG) 58.1. The aircraft carrier remained at Ulithi only two days, departing the atoll with TG 58.1 on the 10th to make air attacks on the Japanese home islands in support of the landings on Iwo Jima. Task Force 58 steamed first to the vicinity of the Marianas to conduct rehearsals over Tinian before heading north. After the air groups carried out the training sorties on 12 February, the ships fueled at sea on the 14th and then headed toward the launching point some 200 km southeast of Tokyo. On the 16th, TF 58 launched its air strikes on Japan proper. Bennington aviators went after targets both at Tokyo and at Yokosuka, site of the large Japanese naval base. While their colleagues pounded Japan, pilots in Bennington's Combat Air Patrol (CAP) helped to protect TG 58.1 from air raids and shot down three intruders. On the negative side, her air group lost one plane to antiaircraft fire over Japan.

The aircraft carrier retired from the vicinity of Honshu on 18 February, fueled the next day, and then steamed toward Iwo Jima to provide close support. She continued that duty from 20 to 22 February before retiring for a fueling rendezvous on the 23rd. The following day, she and her sister carriers set a course back toward Japan. On the 25th, her air group participated in another series of attacks on the Tokyo region of Japan. Retiring on the 26th, Bennington launched aircraft against airfields on Okinawa in the Ryukyu Islands on 1 March. TF 58 headed back to Ulithi on the 3rd and reentered that anchorage the following day for eight days of rest and relaxation.

==== Okinawa campaign ====
On 14 March, she returned to sea. After several days of training exercises, Bennington and the other carriers of TF 58 steamed toward Kyushu, southernmost of the major Japanese home islands, to hit airfields and naval bases there in preparation for the projected invasion of Okinawa. Those attacks went forward on 18 March; and, the following day, Bennington aircraft struck the Kure Naval Arsenal and the area of Hiroshima. On the 20th, the aircraft of Bennington's Carrier Air Group 82 (CVG-82) again attacked airfields on Kyushu. That same day, Bennington and the other units of TF 58 began their retirement from Japanese waters and toward Okinawa to begin direct support for the landings. On 23 March, she began launching raids against Okinawa and the surrounding islands, concentrating primarily on Kerama Retto, a small group of islands located due west of the southern portion of Okinawa and which constituted the first objective of the invading force. That small group of islands, needed as a fleet anchorage and forward repair base, fell late the following day, and the fast carriers shifted their attention to softening up the main objective.

That phase of the operation lasted until early on the morning of the initial landings on 1 April. After the assault force went ashore, Bennington and the other fast carriers began dividing their time between strikes on Okinawa and the surrounding islands in direct support of the occupying troops and raids on the Japanese home islands, primarily Kyushu, in distant support of the operation. On 7 April, Bennington aircraft helped stifle the last major action of the Imperial Japanese Navy. The battleship Yamato, escorted by light cruiser Yahagi and eight destroyers, came out of Japan in a desperate attempt to break up the landings at Okinawa. That force, lacking any air cover, was spotted on the 6th by American submarines; and, on the 7th, by American patrol planes. When TF 58 attack groups found the force on the 7th, Yamato, Yahagi, and four of the destroyers were sunk. The four destroyers that escaped also suffered damage but managed to reach the Sasebo Naval Arsenal. Bennington aviators claimed at least two torpedo hits on the battleship at the cost of a single plane from her air group.

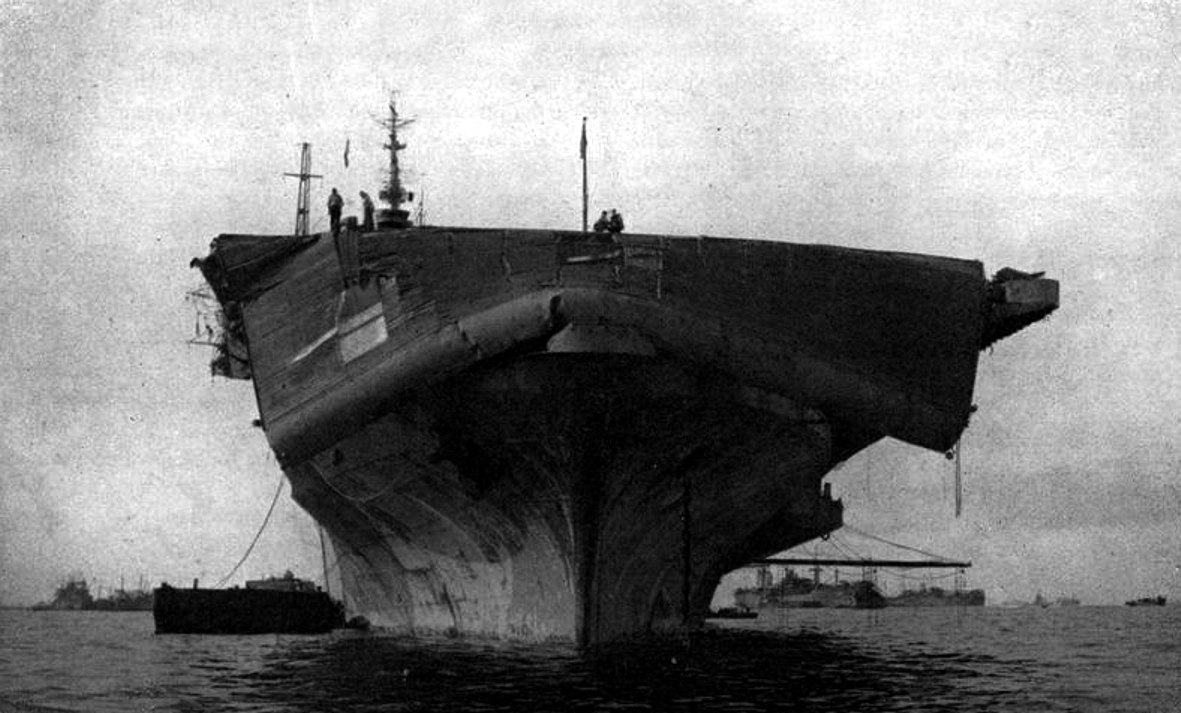
Flight deck of Bennington damaged by Typhoon Connie

The aircraft carrier continued to give support to the Okinawa operation, to provide combat air patrol to intercept enemy air raids, and to attack the airfields that were the points of origin for those raids. On 28 April, Bennington and the rest of TG 58.1 left the vicinity of Okinawa for rest and relaxation at Ulithi. She remained at the fleet anchorage from 30 April to 9 May. On the latter day, she stood out of Ulithi and, after exercises in the area, headed back to Okinawa on the 10th. The aircraft carrier resumed support duty for the Okinawa campaign on 12 May. Again, she divided her time between direct support for the troops fighting on the island and sweeps against the Kyushu airfields. Early in June, Bennington suffered a damaged flight deck when TF 38 (on 27 May the fleet, task forces, and task groups changed designation) steamed through Typhoon Connie. On 9 June, she set a course for Leyte Gulf and repairs. The ship arrived at her destination on the 11th and underwent repairs until the 27th. She cleared the base at San Pedro Bay (Philippines) on 1 July in company with the rest of TF 38.

==== End of the war ====
For the remainder of the war, she and the other fast carriers concentrated exclusively upon the Japanese home islands and surrounding waters. Her planes ranged the length of the island chain from Hokkaido in the north to Kyushu in the south, making frequent attacks on Honshu. Targets included industrial complexes, military and naval installations, and shipping. She was still conducting air strikes off Honshu on 15 August when news broke of the Japanese capitulation.

After hostilities ended, Bennington continued operations in the Japanese home islands in support of occupation forces. Her aviators conducted routine patrols as well as searches for camps containing Allied prisoners of war. That duty lasted until 10 September at which time she entered Tokyo Bay. The aircraft carrier remained in the Far East until mid-October when she set course back to the United States. Along the way, she stopped at Saipan, where she disembarked her air group, and at Pearl Harbor before entering San Francisco Bay on 7 November. She remained there until the first week in January 1946 when she returned to sea, bound for Hawaii transporting a load of planes and a draft of men. After conducting some training operations in the Hawaiian Islands, the carrier headed back to San Francisco where she arrived on 30 March. Early in April, the warship set out on a voyage to the east coast with CVG-19 embarked. She transited the Panama Canal at mid-month and arrived at Norfolk Naval Base, Virginia, on 22 April. She remained there until 8 November at which time she was decommissioned and berthed with the Atlantic Reserve Fleet.

=== Cold War ===
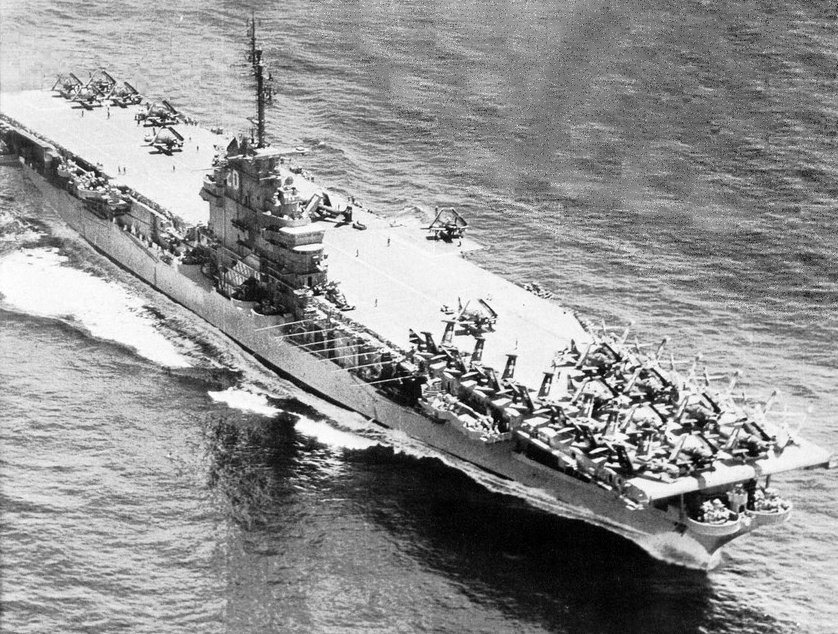
Bennington after her SCB-27A modernization.

Bennington remained in reserve for almost four years. On 29 October 1950, she moved to the New York Naval Shipyard to receive her SCB-27A modernization. Over the next two years, she underwent a transformation that increased her displacement, length, and beam. Her flight deck was strengthened and widened to accommodate jet aircraft, her island was replaced. She also received many modifications to other equipment, such as catapults and elevators, to accomplish the same purpose. In October 1952, while completing those alterations, she was re-designated an attack aircraft carrier (CVA-20). On 13 November, Captain David. B. Young took command of Bennington in a ceremony attended by more than 1,400, including the Secretary of the Navy Dan A. Kimball and Rear Admiral Roscoe H. Hillenkoetter. Marine Air Group 14, under the command of Colonel W.R. Campbell, USMC reported for duty on Bennington on 13 February 1953, and Bennington set off for the waters off Florida to conduct carrier qualifications. The first arrested landing was made on Bennington since her recommissioning by Lieutenant Colonel T.W. Furlow in his AD Skyraider. Furlow was the commanding officer of Marine Attack Squadron 211. The first jet aircraft to land on Bennington occurred on 18 February by Major Carl E. Schmitt in a F9F-5 Cougar. When the qualifications were over, Bennington headed for Guantanamo Bay Naval Base where she underwent 11 weeks of shakedown training with CVG-7 aboard.

During the training cruise, an explosion occurred in her number 1 fireroom on 27 April. 11 men were killed. She put into Guantánamo Bay on the 29th, completed repairs in a week, and returned to sea to continue her shakedown training. On 7 May, she concluded training operations and set a course back to New York. After a stop at Norfolk to disembark her air group, the carrier reentered the New York Naval Shipyard on 25 May to begin post-shakedown availability. That summer, she began normal operations with the United States Atlantic Fleet out of her home port, Naval Air Station Quonset Point, Rhode Island. That duty lasted until mid-September at which time she put to sea to participate in a large-scale NATO exercise, "Operation Mariner". That operation ended on 4 October, and Bennington steamed through the Strait of Gibraltar to begin her first deployment with the United States Sixth Fleet in the Mediterranean Sea, still with CVG-7 on board. That assignment lasted until 16 February 1954 when she embarked upon her homeward voyage. Bennington arrived at Quonset Point on the 21st to disembark her air group. On 1 March, she moved to New York for a shipyard availability and a post-deployment standdown period. Early in April, she returned to sea to conduct carrier qualifications off Mayport, Florida. She completed that mission and returned to Quonset Point on the 29th. Late in May, she moved south to Norfolk where she embarked Air Task Group 181 (ATG-181) on 22 May and put to sea for carrier qualifications in the Narragansett Bay area.

==== 1954 catapult explosion and fire ====
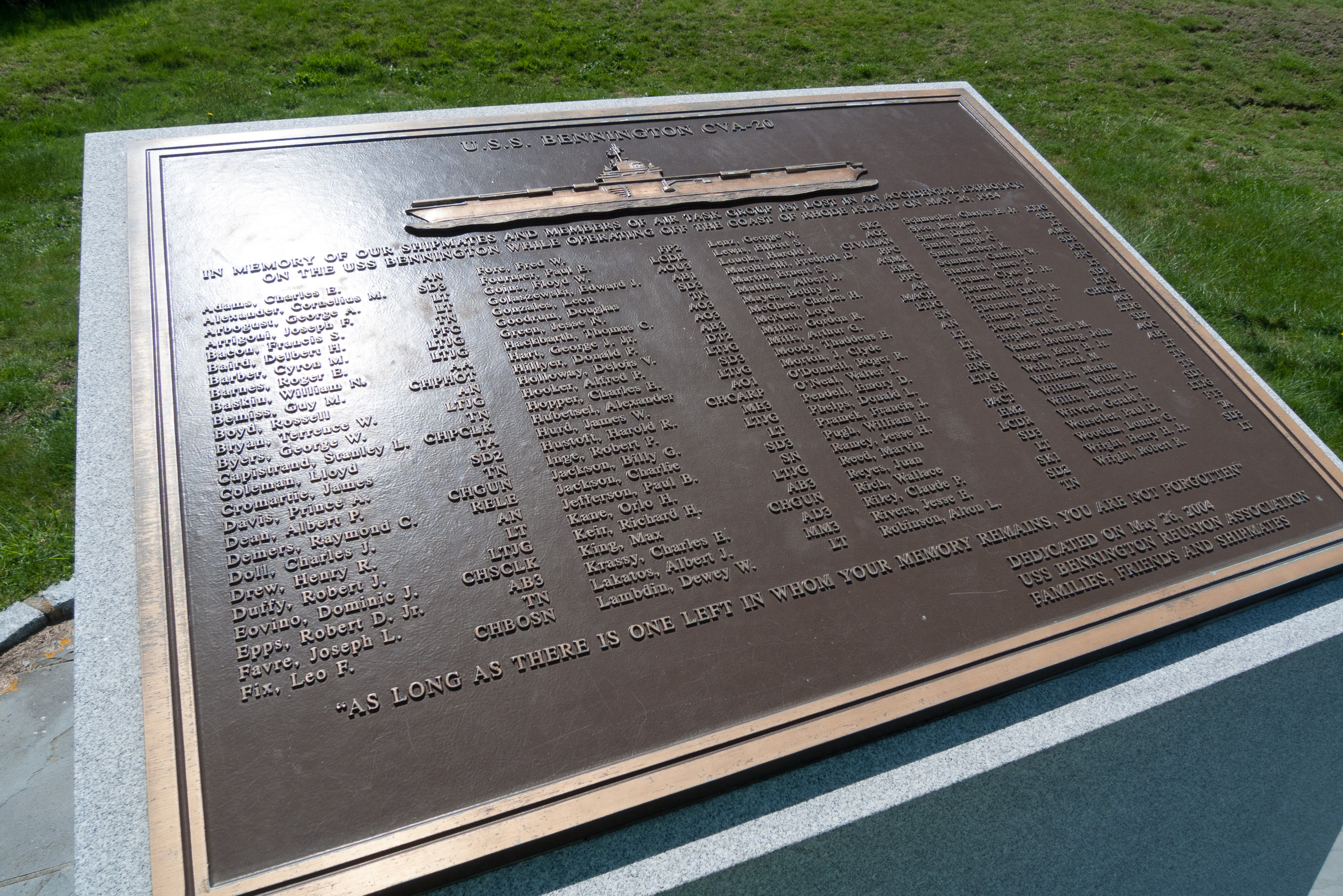
A memorial to the victims of the 1954 explosion was erected at Fort Adams in 2004.

At 0600 on 26 May, Bennington began launching aircraft for the qualifications. Ten minutes later, white "smoke" emanating from Hangar Bay 1 caused Captain William F. Raborn to issue two general fire alarms and within seconds a series of explosions rocked the ship when the port side catapult accumulator burst and released vaporized lubricating oil which was detonated by some unknown heat source. Though severely damaged internally, the warship managed to launch the entire air group and send it into Quonset Point, Rhode Island. She also maintained way on and headed back to Quonset Point while damage control, fire, and rescue parties worked feverishly to control fires, to rescue the injured, and to recover the dead. The most severely injured men were carried to Quonset Point in a helicopter lift, and Bennington dropped the remainder off there before heading to New York for extensive repairs. The explosion cost her 103 officers and men dead and over 200 others injured, most of them severely burned, the second highest casualty count in the post-war peacetime U.S. Navy. (Note: The highest casualty count in the post-war peacetime U.S. Navy was the loss of the Hobson.) A memorial to the sailors who died in the explosion was erected in 2004 at Fort Adams State Park in Newport, Rhode Island.

A court of inquiry into the explosion chaired by Quonset Point Commander Fleet Air John Hoskins determined that hazards related to hydraulic catapults were previously known and had not yet "led to serious consequences." The inquiry's conclusions eventually led to the Navy's abandoning hydro-pneumatic catapults in favor of steam-driven launch systems.

Bennington arrived in the New York Naval Shipyard for extensive repairs on 12 June. In addition to repairing the damaged area, the shipyard made major modifications originally scheduled for a later date. She received the SCB-125 modernization. The two most notable changes were the addition of an enclosed hurricane bow to lessen the potential for damage in heavy weather and of an angled flight deck to improve the efficiency of air operations. She completed repairs and alterations by 11 March 1955. On 22 April 1955, the Secretary of the Navy came aboard and presented medals and letters of commendation to 178 of her crew in recognition of their actions on 26 May 1954. As of 1 August 1955, she was part of Carrier Division 2, along with USS Lake Champlain. The carrier returned to sea on 25 April to conduct carrier qualifications off Naval Station Mayport and post-overhaul shakedown training out of Guantánamo Bay. For the next four months, she conducted normal operations along the east coast and in the West Indies with ATG-201 aboard. On 8 September, the carrier embarked upon a voyage to a new home port and a new fleet. Steaming around Cape Horn, she arrived Naval Base San Diego, California, on 20 October. There, the warship joined the United States Pacific Fleet.

==== 1955–1964 ====
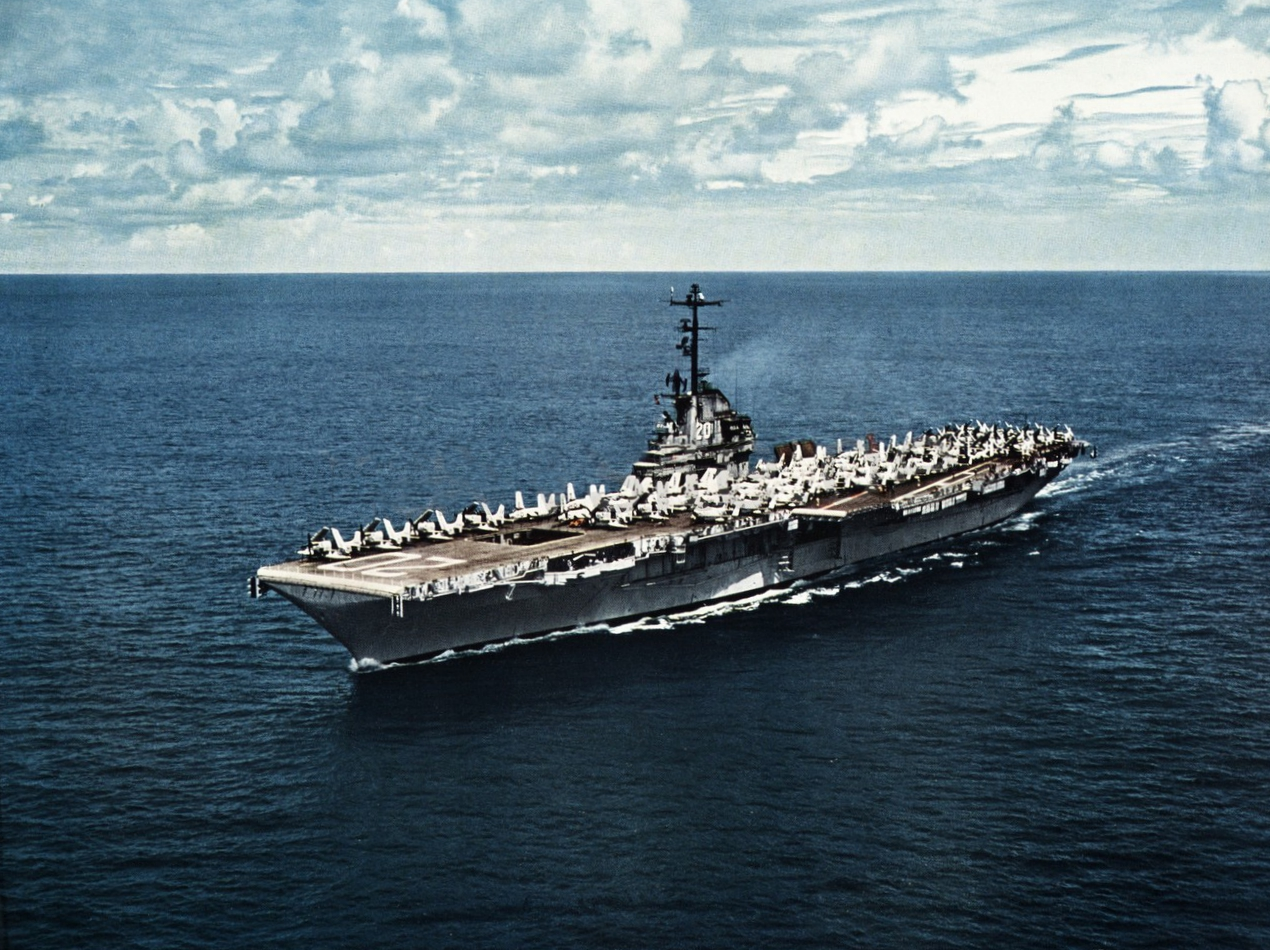
Bennington underway in 1958

Over the next nine years, the period preceding the United States' full entrance into the conflict in Vietnam, Bennington divided her time between deployments to the United States Seventh Fleet in Far Eastern waters and normal evolutions along the California coast. During that time, she made five deployments to the Western Pacific. The first two, made during the winter of 1955 and 1956 and the winter of 1957 and 1958, proved to be of routine nature, combining training evolutions and goodwill visits to various Asian ports. ATG-201 was embarked for the first cruise, ATG-181 for the second.

On 7 May 1957, while docked in Sydney for Coral Sea Day celebrations, ten University of Sydney students dressed as pirates boarded the aircraft carrier in the early morning hours undetected. While some began soliciting donations from the Navy crew for a local charity, others entered the bridge. The public address system was turned on. "Now hear this!" announced Paul Lennon, a medical student. "The USS Bennington has been captured by Sydney University pirates!" Alarms for general quarters, atomic and chemical attacks were sounded, rousing the crew from their bunks. Marines escorted the students off the ship at bayonet-point. No charges were filed.

The third deployment of the period, from August 1958 to January 1959 with ATG-4 aboard, came as an emergency assignment occasioned by Chinese threat to the Taiwanese offshore islands, Quemoy and Matsu Islands. The carrier's service during the Second Taiwan Strait Crisis earned her the Armed Forces Expeditionary Medal. Following her return to normal west coast duty in January 1959, the U.S. Navy decided to use the carrier exclusively for antisubmarine warfare. On 30 June 1959, she became an antisubmarine warfare support aircraft carrier (CVS-20). Carrier Anti-Submarine Air Group 59 (CVSG-59) was assigned to Bennington until her decommissioning. She appeared in the movie The Wackiest Ship in The Army. During her fourth tour of duty in the Far East, carried out between October 1960 and May 1961, the Laotian crisis erupted. Again, she earned the Armed Forces Expeditionary Medal. The final deployment of that period was characterized by a return to more normal duty, training and port calls. Bennington was dispatched to Eureka, in Humboldt County, California, during the Christmas flood of 1964 to provide disaster relief from severe flooding with water levels that exceeded thirty feet. The Bennington remained offshore in heavy seas and the twenty Marine helicopters she carried were invaluable in providing assistance and supplies to the stricken residents.

==== Vietnam War and later career ====
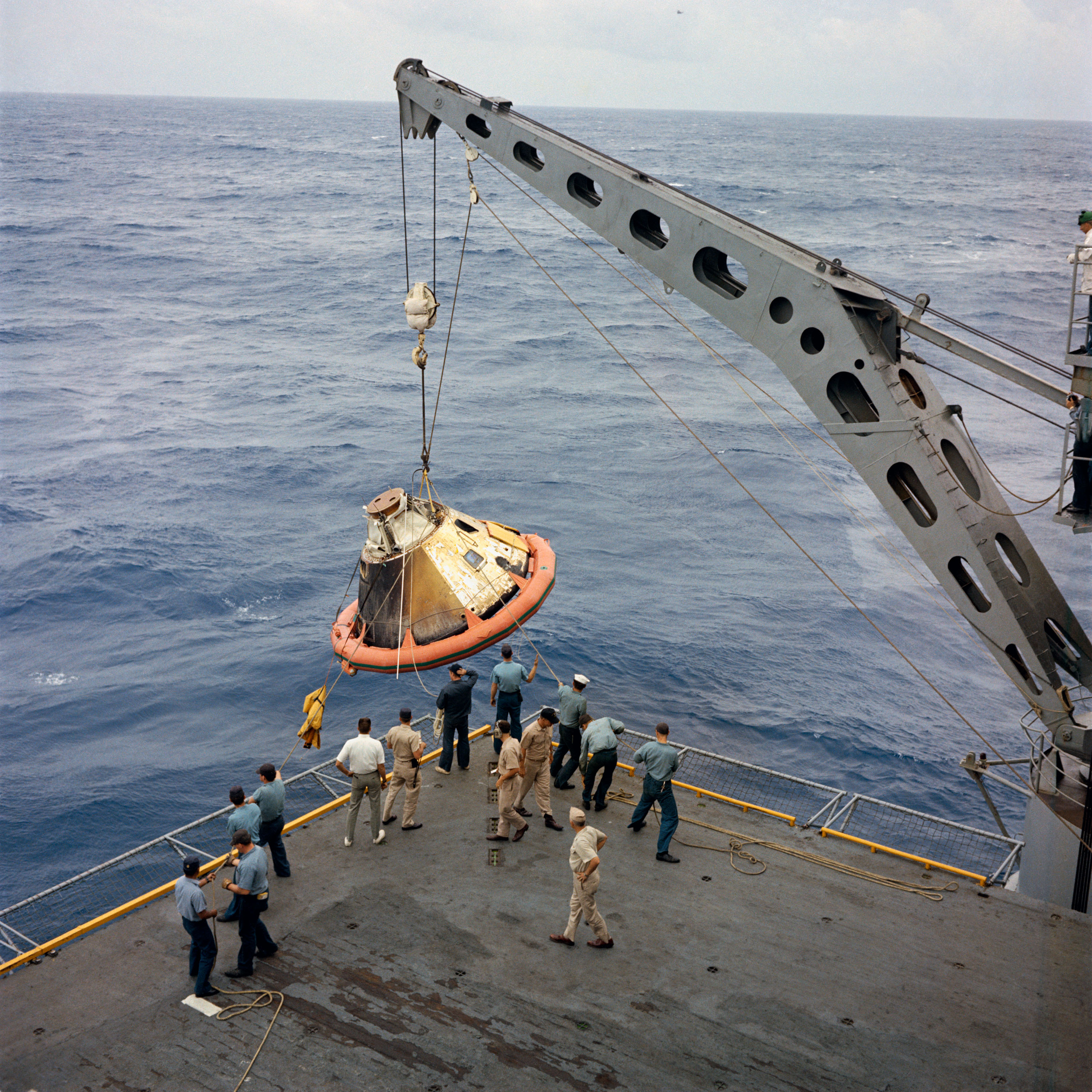
Apollo Spacecraft 017 Command Module, with flotation collar still attached, is hoisted aboard the Bennington on 9 November 1967

Bennington's final seven years of active service, which included four more assignments with the 7th Fleet, coincided with the period of direct involvement of United States armed forces in the Vietnam War. The first deployment of this phase of her career started peacefully enough early in 1964, but the Tonkin Gulf incident in August extended her Far Eastern tour and brought duty in Vietnamese waters in October and November. Her next 7th Fleet tour of duty, during the summer and fall of 1965, brought more duty off the coast of Vietnam, but the service was not nearly so extensive as the she would perform during her final two deployments.

On 18 May 1966, while cruising off of San Diego, California, Bennington hosted the experimental LTV XC-142 aircraft as it executed 44 short takeoffs and landings and six vertical takeoffs and landings, the ship steaming at various speeds to generate different velocities of wind-over-the-deck. She was the prime recovery vessel for the unmanned Apollo 4 mission and on 9 November 1967 recovered the spacecraft which had splashed down 10 mi (16 km) from the ship.

On 4 November 1966, Bennington embarked upon her next to last 7th Fleet assignment. Throughout that tour of duty, she served with the larger carriers on Yankee Station in the Gulf of Tonkin. In addition to providing antisubmarine protection to Task Force 77, she also had the responsibility for tracking and identifying all ships operating in the vicinity of the task force and for providing search and rescue services for downed aviators. The deployment ended on 21 April, and Bennington headed for Australia to participate in the celebration commemorating the 25th anniversary of the Allied victory in the Battle of the Coral Sea. The carrier departed Sydney, Australia, on 8 May and, after a stop at Pearl Harbor on the 18th, arrived in San Diego on 23 May 1967.

After almost a year of normal operations along the west coast, she stood out of Long Beach, California, for the final deployment on 30 April 1968. She made a stop at Pearl Harbor from 15 to 20 May and arrived in United States Fleet Activities Yokosuka on 29 May. Her last deployment brought more of the same duty that she had seen on the previous one, antisubmarine protection for TF 77, ship identification work, and search and rescue services. She concluded that tour of duty on 28 October when she departed Yokosuka to return to the United States. Bennington arrived in Long Beach on 9 November and, on the 14th, entered the Long Beach Naval Shipyard for a five-month yard overhaul. The aircraft carrier resumed active service on 30 April 1969 and conducted normal operations along the California coast for the remainder of the year and into January 1970. On 15 January 1970, Bennington was placed out of commission with the Pacific Reserve Fleet at Puget Sound Naval Shipyard, Bremerton, Washington, and stricken from the Naval Vessel Register on 20 September 1989. The carrier was finally sold for scrap on 12 January 1994, being subsequently towed across the Pacific for scrapping in India.

== Awards ==
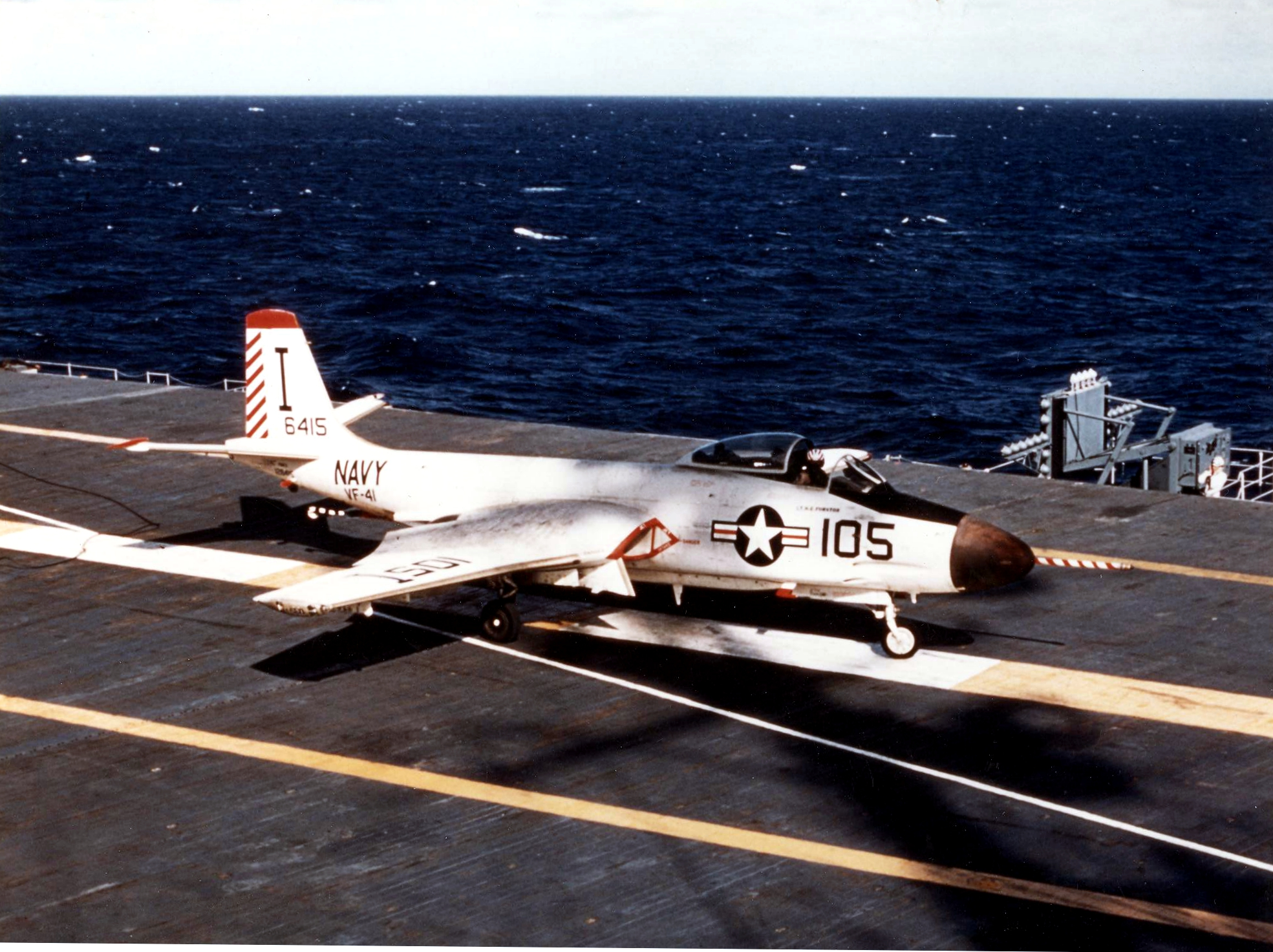
F2H-3 Banshee of VF-41 on Bennington in 1956

Bennington earned three battle stars for World War II service and five battle stars during the Vietnam conflict.

- Navy Meritorious Unit Commendation (2)
- China Service Medal (Extended)
- American Campaign Medal
- Asiatic-Pacific Campaign Medal (3 battle stars)
- World War II Victory Medal
- Navy Occupation Service Medal (with Asia and Europe clasps)
- National Defense Service Medal (2)
- Armed Forces Expeditionary Medal (2)
- Vietnam Service Medal (5 battle stars)
- Republic of Vietnam Meritorious Unit Citation (Gallantry Cross Medal with Palm)
- Republic of Vietnam Campaign Medal

== Gallery ==
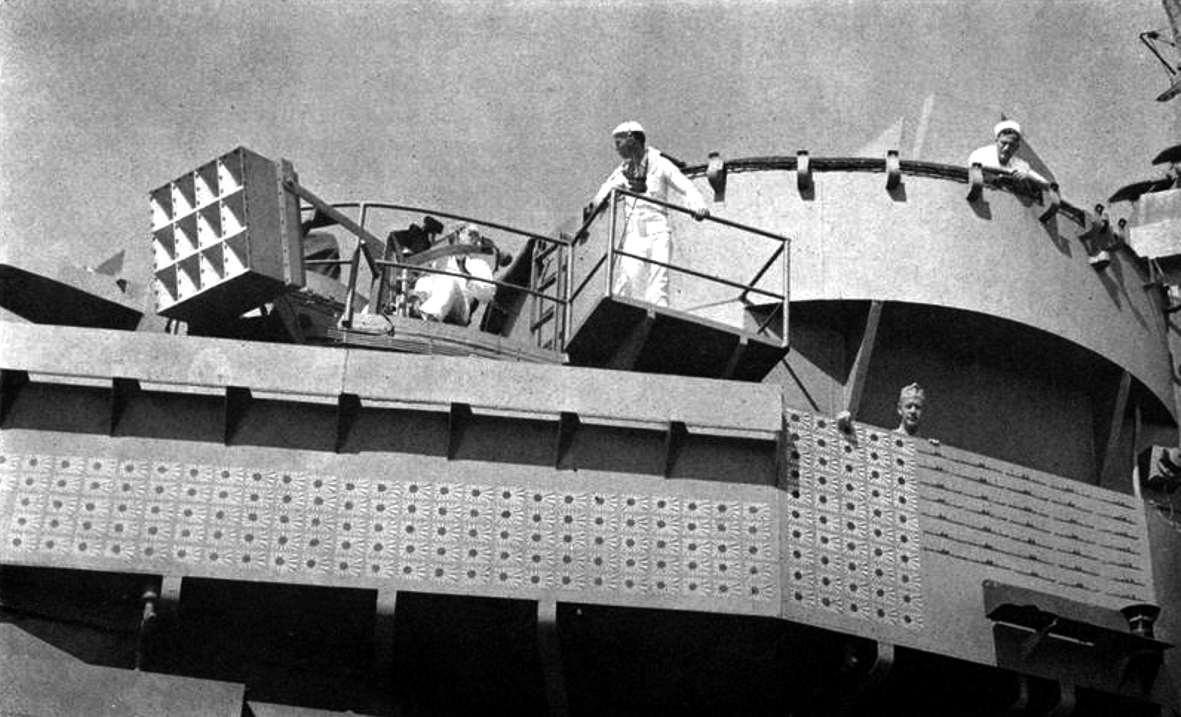
Bennington's scoreboard in August 1945

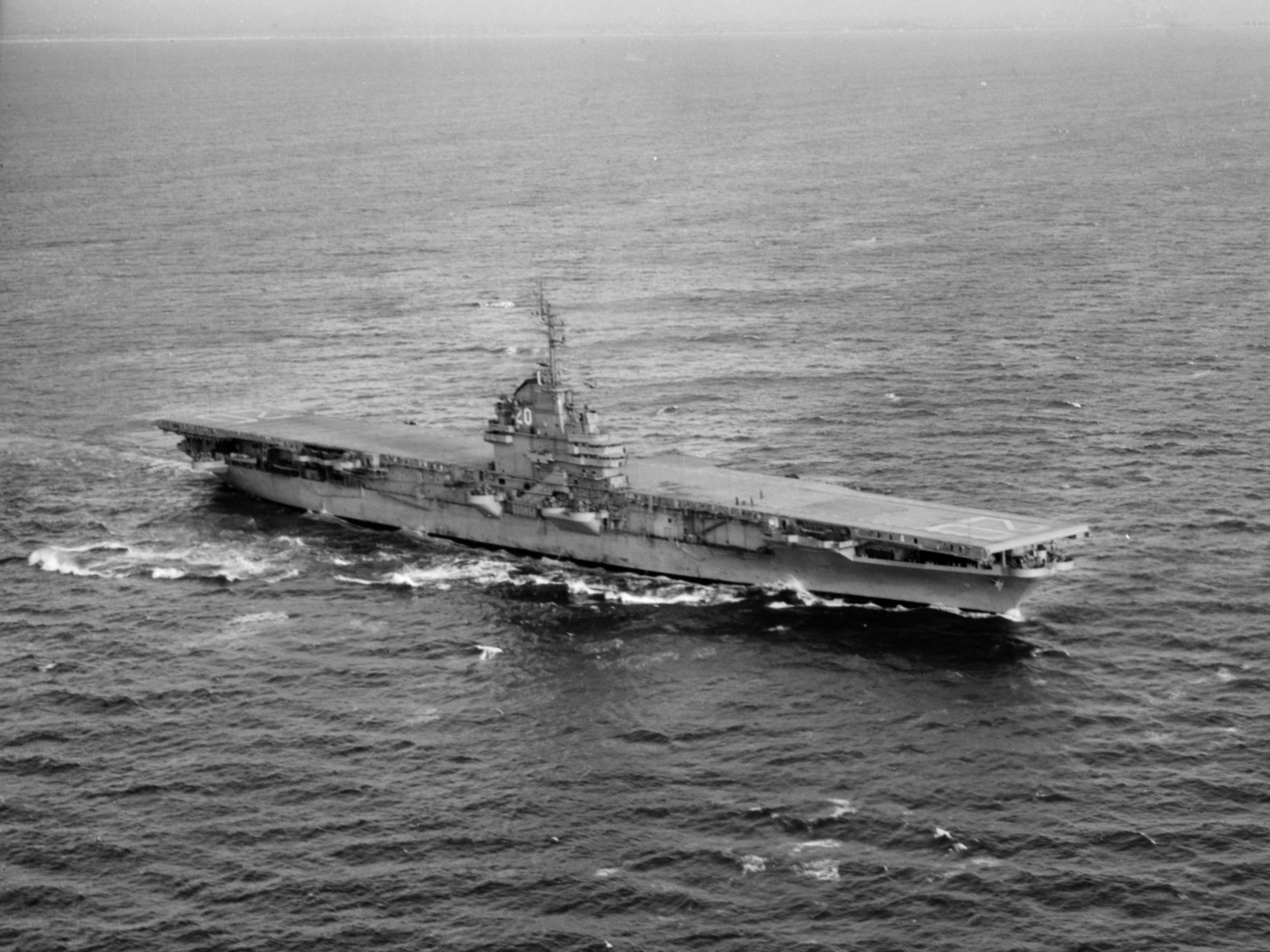
Bennington at sea in 1953

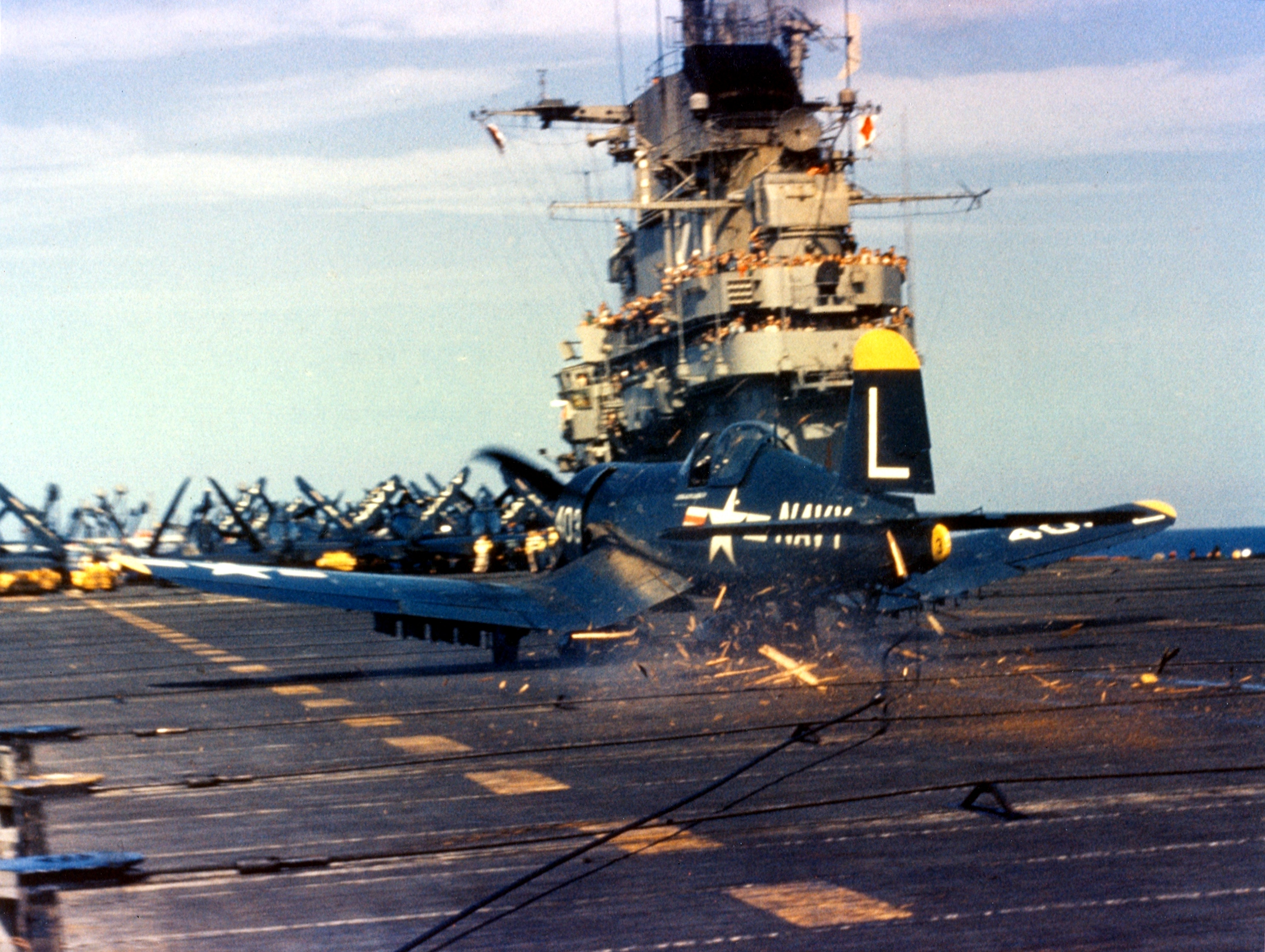
F4U-4 Corsair of VF-74 making crash landing on Bennington in 1953

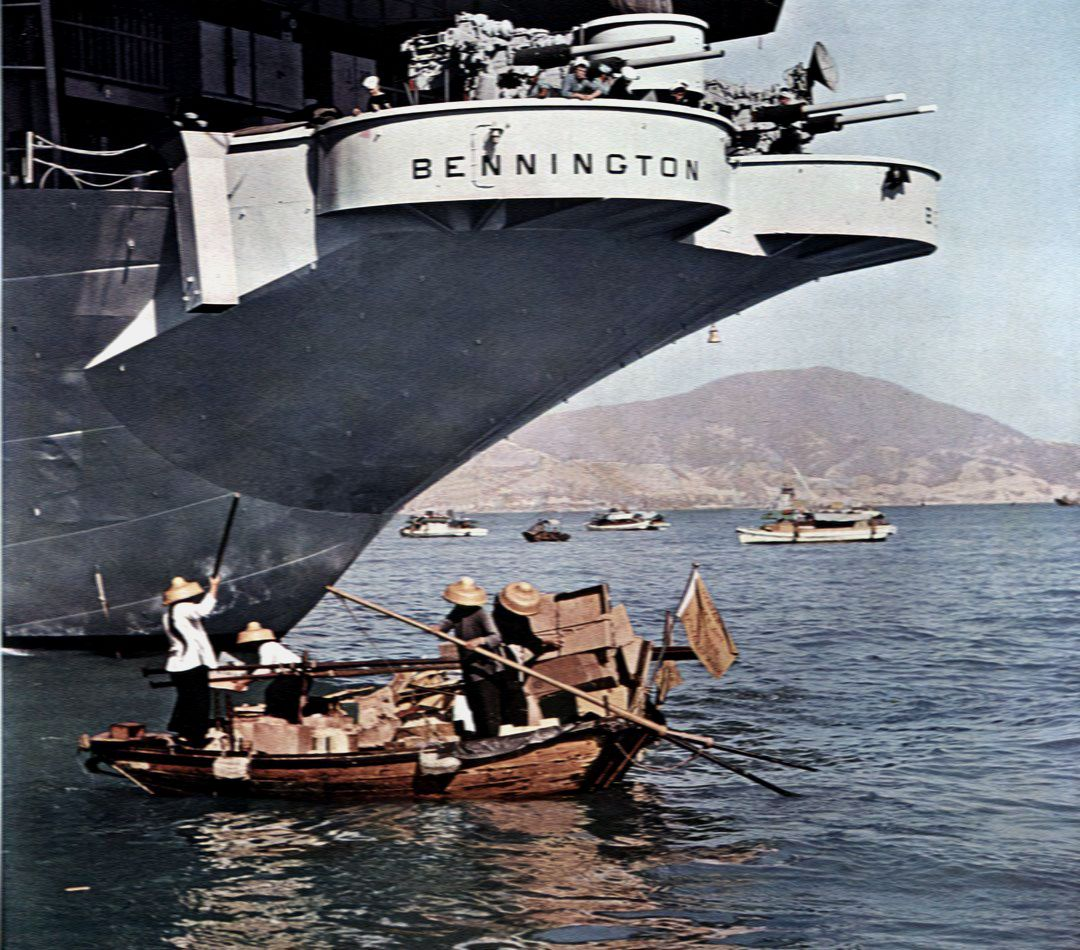
Bennington in Hong Kong, 1957

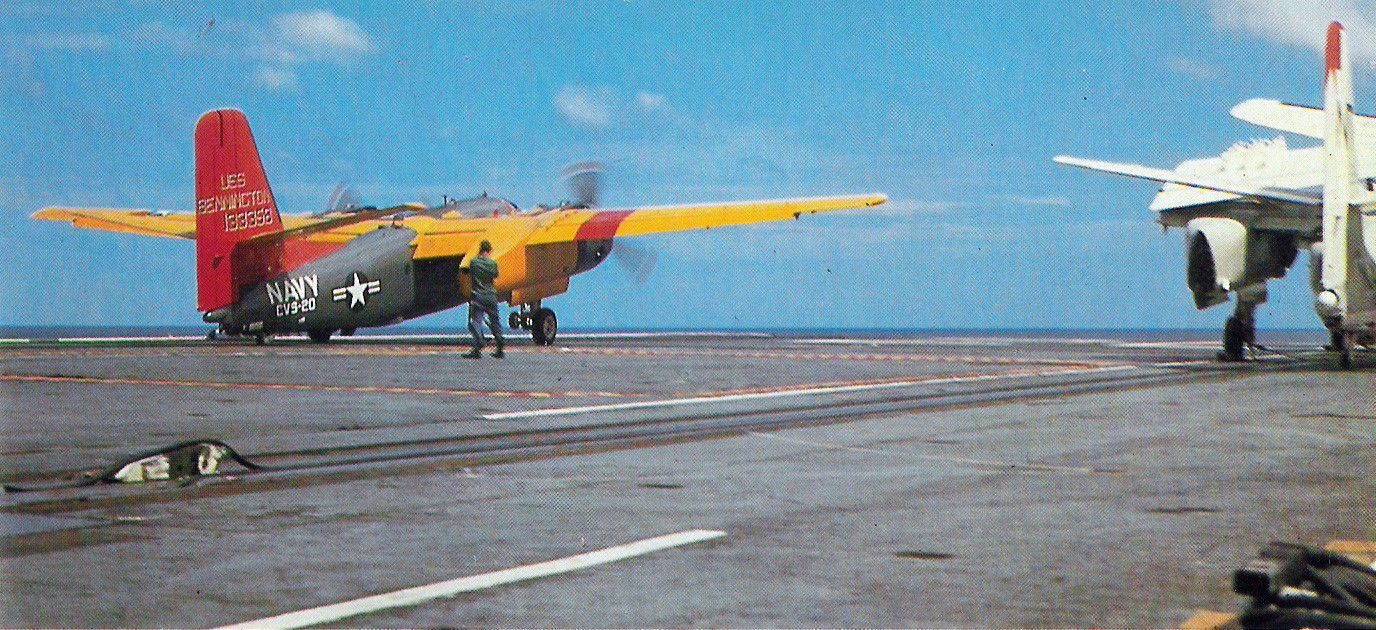
US-2C Tracker is launched from Bennington in the 1960s

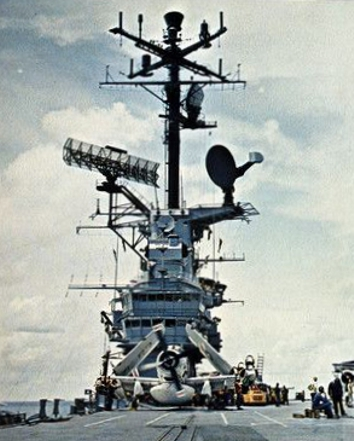
Island of Bennington in 1964

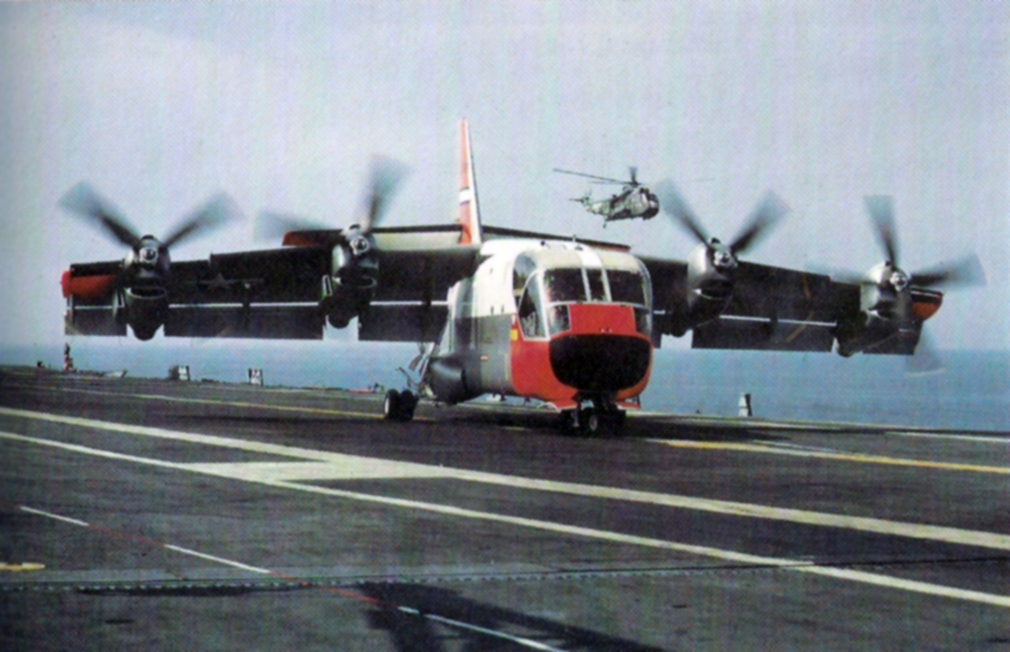
LTV XC-142 on deck of Bennington in 1966

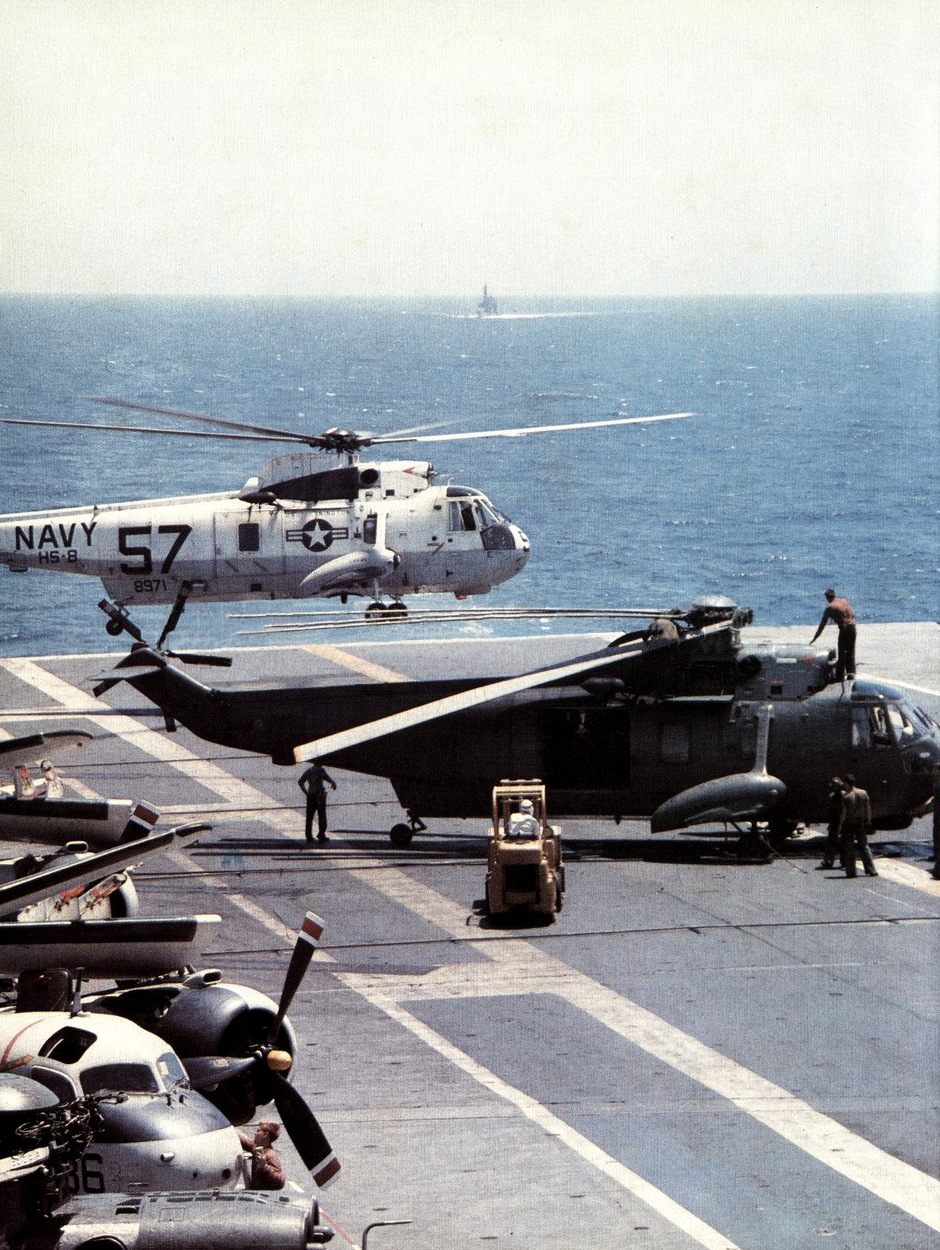
SH-3A Sea Kings of HS-8 on Bennington in late 1968
