= Joseph Chilton Pearce =

American author (1926–2016)

- Born: January 14, 1926; Pineville, Kentucky, U.S.
- Died: August 23, 2016 (aged 90)
- Occupations: Author, Lecturer

Joseph Chilton Pearce (January 14, 1926 – August 23, 2016) was an American author of a number of books on human development and child development and is best known for his books, The Crack in the Cosmic Egg (1971), Magical Child (1977) and The Bond of Power: Meditation and Wholeness (1981). He preferred the name "Joe".

== Early life and education ==
Joseph Chilton Pearce was born on January 14, 1926, in the Appalachian Mountain town of Pineville in central Kentucky. He served in the U.S. Army Air Corps during World War II.

After the war, Pearce earned a B.A. from the College of William and Mary in Williamsburg, Virginia, followed by an M.A. degree from Indiana University. He did post-graduate studies at Geneva Theological College in Beaver Falls, Pennsylvania.

== Career ==
Pearce taught college humanities courses until the mid-1960s, and thereafter devoted himself to writing and lecturing. In the following decades, he wrote on themes ranging from child development to the mind/heart connection and spirituality, in a dozen books. He presented the idea of the heart, or compassionate mind, as a category of brain function equal in stature to the thalamus, prefrontal cortex and lower brain.

Pearce believed that active, imaginative play is the most important of all childhood activities because it cultivates mastery of one's environment, which he terms "creative competence." Children denied that form of play develop feelings of isolation and anxiety. He also believed that child-parent bonding is crucial, and saw modern clinical childbirth and lack of breast feeding as obstructions to that bonding.

In the 1970-1980s Pearce practiced meditation under the guidance of Swami Muktananda, and he wrote a book about that subject, The Bond of Power.

Pearce died in August 2016 at the age of 90.

== Bibliography ==
- The Crack in the Cosmic Egg: Challenging Constructs of Mind and Reality (1971) and multiple later editions. ISBN 0-85629-040-8
- Exploring the Crack in the Cosmic Egg – Split Minds and Meta-Realities (1974) ISBN 0-671-83118-6
- Magical Child (1977) ISBN 0-525-15035-8
- The Bond of Power: Meditation and Wholeness (1982) ISBN 0-7100-9278-4
- Magical Child Matures (1985) ISBN 0-525-24329-1
- Evolution's End: Claiming the Potential of Our Intelligence (1992) ISBN 0-06-250693-5
- The Crack in the Cosmic Egg: New Constructs of Mind and Reality (2002) ISBN 0-89281-994-4
- The Biology of Transcendence: A Blueprint of the Human Spirit (2002) ISBN 1-59477-016-6
- Spiritual Initiation and the Breakthrough of Consciousness: The Bond of Power (2003) ISBN 0-89281-995-2
- From Magical Child to Magical Teen: A Guide to Adolescent Development. Inner Traditions/Bear. 2003. ISBN 978-0-89281-996-6.
- Death of Religion and the Rebirth of Spirit: A Return to the Intelligence of the Heart (2007) ISBN 1-59477-171-5
- Strange Loops and Gestures of Creation. Goldenstone Press. 2010. ISBN 978-0-9832261-0-9.
- The Heart-Mind Matrix: How the Heart Can Teach the Mind New Ways to Think (2012) ISBN 978-1-59477-488-1
