= High Bridge of Kentucky =

Railroad bridge crossing the Kentucky River Palisades in Jessamine County, KY, US

High Bridge
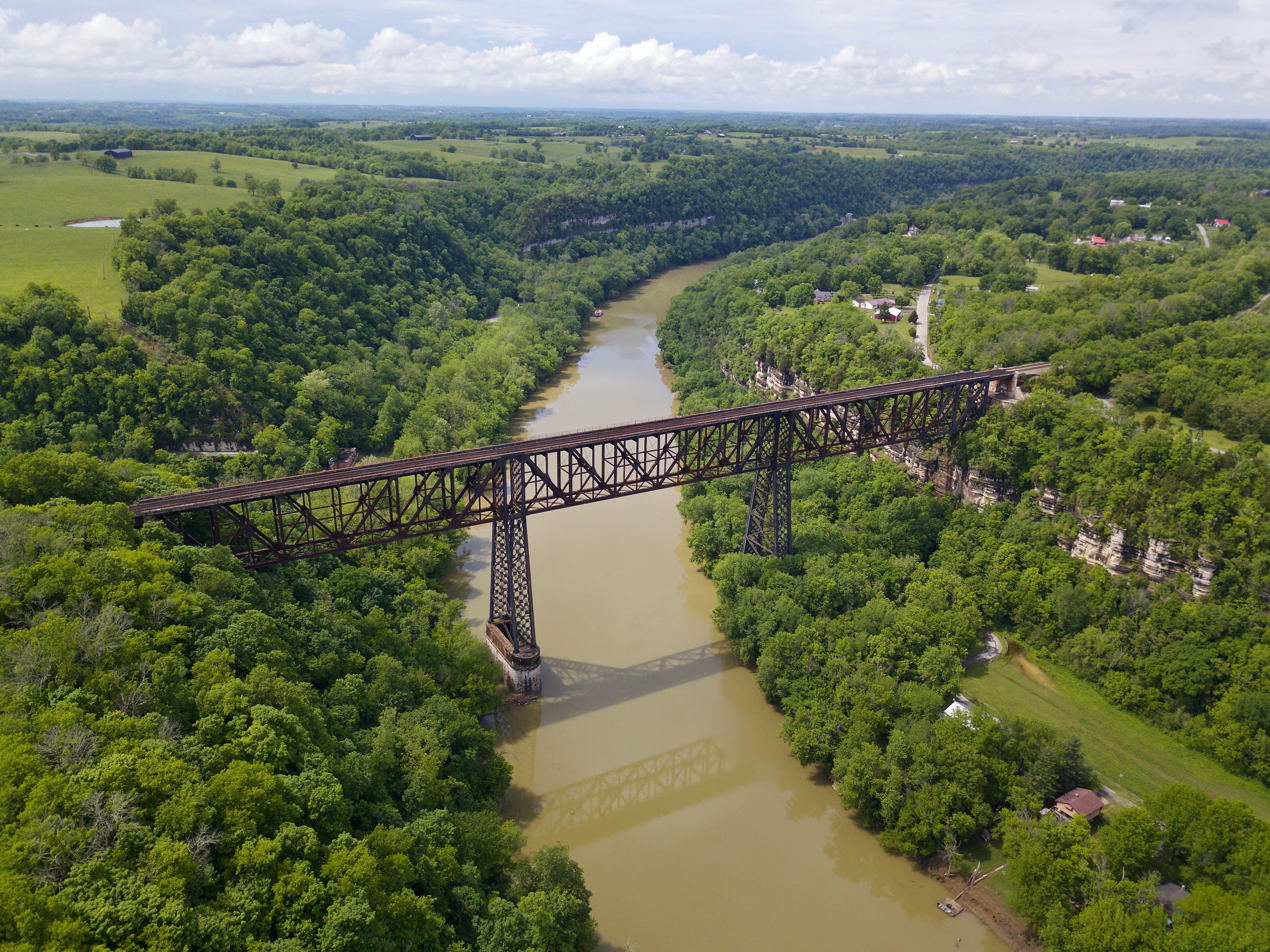
- An aerial view of the High Bridge
- Coordinates: 37.8168°N 84.7200°W
- Carries: Norfolk Southern Railway
- Crosses: Kentucky River
- Locale: Jessamine & Mercer Counties, Kentucky, United States

Characteristics
- Design: Truss
- Total length: 1,125 feet (343 m)
- Height: 275 feet (84 m) (or 308 ft.)

History
- Designer: Charles Shaler Smith (1876); Gustav Lindenthal (1911)
- Opened: 1877; 148 years ago

Location
- Interactive map of High Bridge

The High Bridge is a railroad bridge crossing the Kentucky River Palisades, in Kentucky. The bridge, about 275 feet over the river below, connects Jessamine and Mercer counties. It was formally dedicated in 1879, and is the first cantilever bridge built in the United States. It has a three-span continuous under-deck truss, which is used by Norfolk Southern Railway to carry trains between Lexington and Danville. The High Bridge is a National Historic Civil Engineering Landmark.

== History ==
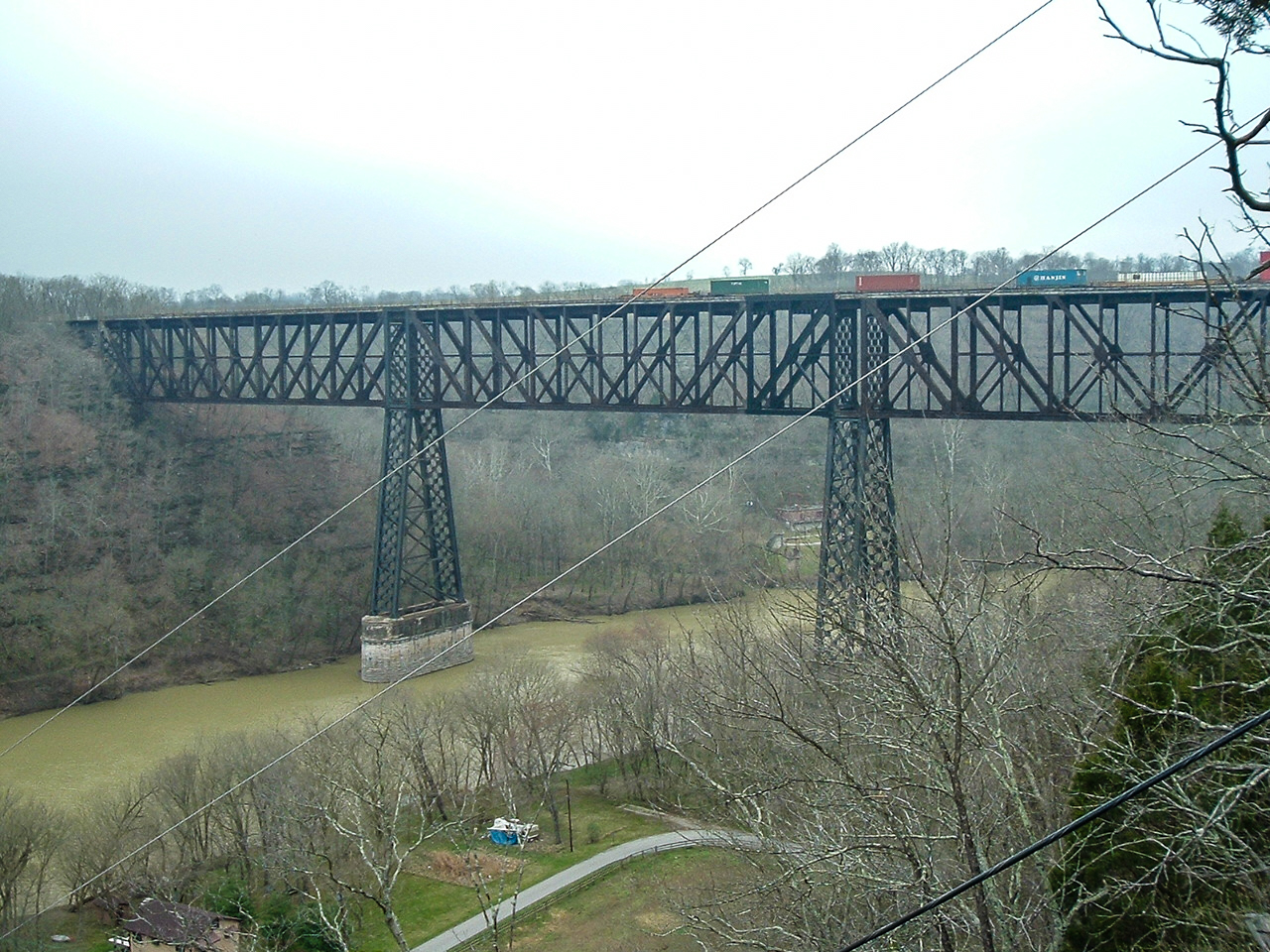
High Bridge, viewed from Jessamine County

In 1851, the Lexington & Danville Railroad, with Julius Adams as chief engineer, retained John A. Roebling (who later designed the Brooklyn Bridge) to build a railroad suspension bridge across the Kentucky River for a line connecting Lexington and Danville, Kentucky, west of the confluence of the Dix and Kentucky rivers. In 1855, the company ran out of money, having built only stone towers and anchorages.

The project was resumed by the Cincinnati Southern Railway in 1873 following a proposal by C. Shaler Smith for an innovative cantilever design, using Roebling's stone towers as anchors. The bridge was erected with a three-span continuous under-deck truss, and was opened in 1877. It was 275 feet (84 m) tall and 1,125 feet (343 m) long: the tallest bridge above a navigable waterway in North America and the tallest railroad bridge in the world until the early 20th century. Construction was completed using 3,654,280 pounds of iron at a total cost of $404,373.31. In 1879 President Rutherford B. Hayes and Gen. William Tecumseh Sherman attended the dedication.

Around 1908, Kentucky River High Bridge and the surrounding area was a popular destination for local Kentucky artist Paul Sawyier. Sawyier made many friends living in the area and the landscape was the subject of many of his famous paintings. In addition to making many friends with local residents, he met the love of his life, Mary Thomas (Mayme) Bull during her travels to the Kentucky River area. She became the subject of one of his paintings in 1908, ‘Portrait of Mayme Bull in River Landscape’.

After years of heavy railroad use, the bridge was rebuilt by Gustav Lindenthal in 1911. Lindenthal reinforced the foundations and rebuilt the bridge around the original structure. To keep railroad traffic flowing, the track deck was raised by 30 feet during construction and a temporary trestle was constructed. In 1929, an additional set of tracks was built to accommodate increased railroad traffic and the original limestone towers were removed.

Although the last passenger train was withdrawn from this route in 1970, the bridge continues to be used by Norfolk Southern freight trains. The bridge site can be reached by road via Kentucky State Route 29. In 2005 state and county officials jointly reopened a nearby park which had been closed since the mid-1960s. This included a restored open-air dance pavilion, first used in the 19th century; as well as a new playground, picnic area, and viewing platform that overlooks the bridge and river's edge from the top of the palisades.

== See also ==
- List of bridges documented by the Historic American Engineering Record in Kentucky
- List of bridges in the United States by height
