= William H. Buracker =

Massachusetts Commissioner of Public Works
- In office 1947–1949
- Preceded by: Joseph Cairnes
- Succeeded by: William F. Callahan

Personal details
- Born: July 25, 1897 Luray, Virginia
- Died: March 7, 1977 (aged 79) Winchester, Massachusetts
- Education: United States Naval Academy; Massachusetts Institute of Technology
- Occupation: U.S. Navy officer Engineer
- Awards: Purple Heart; Silver Star; Legion of Merit with the Combat "V"; Navy Cross

Military service
- Allegiance: United States of America
- Branch/service: United States Navy
- Years of service: 1920–1947
- Rank: Rear admiral
- Battles/wars: Battle of Midway; Battle of Leyte Gulf

William Houck Buracker (July 25, 1897 – March 7, 1977) was a Rear Admiral in the United States Navy who served as commanding officer of the USS Princeton during the Battle of Leyte Gulf, was a member of the task force that carried out the Gilbert and Marshall Islands campaign, and was the operations officer for the carrier task force that transported planes for the Doolittle Raid. After leaving the Navy, Buracker worked as an engineer and was Massachusetts Commissioner of Public Works from 1947 to 1949.

== Early life ==
Buracker was born in Luray, Virginia, on July 25, 1897. He graduated from the United States Naval Academy in 1920. He became a Navy pilot and was a member of the squadron which made the first non-stop flight from California to Central America. From 1928 to 1930 he studied aeronautic engineering at the Massachusetts Institute of Technology. While there he met Dorothy Martin of Winchester, Massachusetts. The two later married.

== World War II ==
At the outbreak of World War II, Buracker was attached to the staff of Adm. William F. Halsey. Buracker was the operations officer of the carrier task force that transported planes for the Doolittle Raid. He was operations officer in the carrier raids on the Gilbert Islands, Marshall Islands, Wake Island and Marcus Island. He was awarded the Silver Star "for conspicuous gallantry and intrepidity in action while serving on the Staff of the Task Force Commander" during the raids.

After the Battle of Midway, Buracker returned to the United States. From August 1942 to May 1943 he was commander of the Naval Air Station Pensacola in Pensacola, Florida. In this role, Buracker oversaw the expansion of the base, which included the construction and expansion of air fields. United States Secretary of the Navy James Forrestal publicly commended Buracker for his work in Pensacola.

In 1943, Buracker became the fleet aviation officer on the staff of Adm. Chester Nimitz. In early 1944 he was given command of the USS Princeton. As commander of the Princeton, Buracker launched raids on Hollandia, Formosa, the Philippines, and the Marshall, Ryukyu, and Palau Islands. He was credited with "contribut[ing] directly toward destroying a large part of the enemy's navy and air force" during the months of September and October 1944.

During the Battle of Leyte Gulf in October 1944, a 500-pound Japanese bomb went through the deck of the Princeton and ignited a series of fires. Buracker attempted to save the ship, however he gave the order to abandon ship after it was determined that the best tactical course of action would be to intentionally fire on and sink the ship. Buracker was awarded the Purple Heart, Legion of Merit with the Combat "V", and the Navy Cross for his actions during the sinking of the Princeton. At the time of the battle, Buracker was scheduled for relief as commander of the ship and his replacement, John Hoskins was already aboard the Princeton when the battle commenced.

== Post-War life ==
In December 1945, Buracker was assigned to MIT, where he served as a professor of naval science and commanding officer of the naval training school there.

On May 1, 1947, Buracker retired from the navy to become the Massachusetts Commissioner of Public Works. During his tenure as Public Works Commissioner, Buracker oversaw the expansion of Boston's Logan Airport. He pushed for the construction of a central terminal building, four runways, and two aprons. On January 5, 1949, Buracker resigned so that incoming Governor Paul A. Dever could appoint his own commissioner.

After leaving state service, Buracker worked for the engineering firm of Jackson and Moreland until his retirement.

Buracker died on March 7, 1977, in Winchester.

== Portrayal in film ==
Buracker was portrayed by Hayden Rorke in The Eternal Sea, a 1955 film about the life of John Hoskins, Robert Shayne in Tora! Tora! Tora!, and Jack Ging in War and Remembrance (miniseries).
