= John Hoskins (admiral) =

United States Navy Vice Admiral

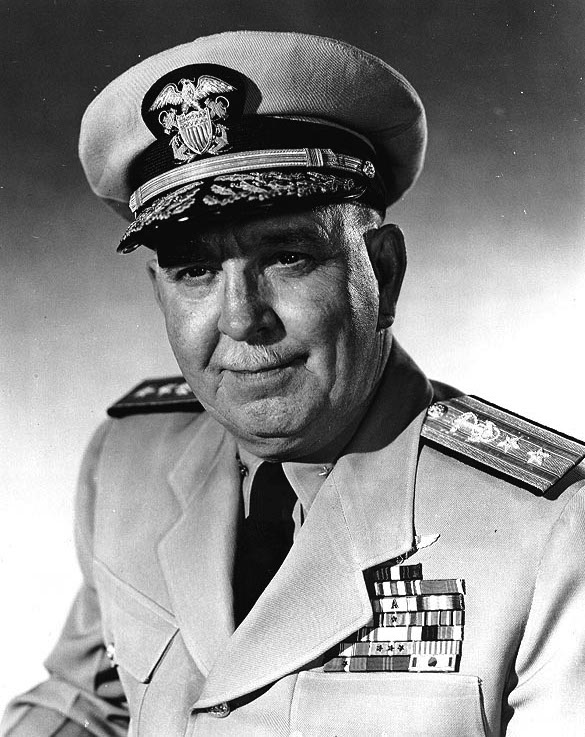
- Rear Admiral John Hoskins (1956)
- Born: John Madison Hoskins; October 22, 1898; Pineville, Kentucky
- Died: March 30, 1964 (aged 65); Falls Church, Virginia
- Burial place: Arlington National Cemetery
- Spouse: Sue Waters Hoskins
- Military career
- Branch: United States Navy
- Service years: 1917–1957
- Rank: Vice Admiral
- Nicknames: "Uncle John", "Peg-Leg"
- Commands: USS Princeton; USS Valley Forge; MATS; Commander, Fleet Air
- Conflicts: World War II: Battle of Leyte Gulf; Korean War: Battle of Inchon
- Awards: Navy Cross; Navy Distinguished Service Medal; Silver Star; Legion of Merit; Purple Heart

John Madison Hoskins (October 22, 1898 – March 30, 1964) was an officer and aviator in the United States Navy who retired as Vice Admiral. After graduating the United States Naval Academy, Hoskins entered flight school and served his entire subsequent career in naval aviation, serving aboard and eventually commanding aircraft carriers in the Pacific Ocean after World War II. Despite losing his right foot in an explosion which destroyed USS Princeton (CVL-23) in 1944, Hoskins refused retirement and went on to serve as the first commanding officer of the new USS Princeton (CV-37). After the war, Hoskins became a leading proponent of jet aircraft on carriers, was assigned to training command of the first naval jet aviators designated for carrier assignment.

In the early days of the Korean War, Hoskins commanded the first carrier group on station following the outbreak of hostilities on the Korean peninsula; the naval flight group under his command based on USS Valley Forge gave airborne support to retreating South Korean army units. While he was commanding officer of Valley Forge, the carrier group and her aircraft were twice deployed to the war zone to repel advances by the enemy and made major air cover contributions to the successful Inchon landings. While commanding Carrier Division Seventeen, "Uncle John" Hoskins was featured in a Life Magazine article which helped familiarize the public with carrier operations in the Korean theater.

Hoskins was later assigned to command the Military Air Transport Service, MATS flying U.S. military personnel of all branches to and from duty stations around the globe, often helping to bring wounded personnel quickly from remote areas to base hospitals where their wounds could rapidly receive medical care. In 1955, Hoskins was the subject of a biographical film made by Republic Pictures entitled The Eternal Sea with Sterling Hayden and Alexis Smith portraying Hoskins and his wife Sue. After retirement, Hoskins was appointed head of the Department of Defense's Office of Declassification Policy.

== Early life and education ==
Hoskins was born on October 22, 1898, to Thomas Jefferson and Lucy Renfro Hoskins in Pineville, Kentucky, the county seat of Bell County. The youngest of six children, Hoskins only completed one year of high school and had a difficult time gaining entrance to the United States Naval Academy at Annapolis, Maryland, having to take the written entrance examinations three times and physical examination four times before gaining entrance one month shy of his 19th birthday.

Hoskins had a hard time getting through his first year at the academy, ranking 299 out of 300 classmates academically. He also lagged behind his classmates physically, needing continuing special instruction to pass swimming tests. Hoskins improved his class ranking to 201 by the end of his senior year but also accumulated 123 demerits. Hoskins was manager of the tennis team for two seasons and was on the staff of Lucky Bag during his senior year. Classmates remember Midshipman Hoskins as being "the loudest and most obnoxious snorer", but was saluted by classmates in the academy yearbook as a ladies' man, "He can convince any femme that she is the best friend he has in the world ... any chaperone that her presence is unnecessary".

== Naval career ==
=== Inter-war period ===
At the end of World War I, Hoskins was serving aboard battleship USS Wisconsin (BB-9), the academy training ship, cruising domestic waters as part of the wartime Atlantic Fleet. He graduated from the academy on June 2, 1921, and after appointment as ensign, was ordered to USS Nevada (BB-36), a Pacific Fleet battleship. After attending a Navy football game with a number of his nieces and nephews, Navy colleagues started calling him "Uncle John" and the sobriquet stuck. Over the next four years, Hoskins served at sea in dreadnought battleship USS Arkansas (BB-33) and destroyer USS Maury (DD-100), after which he requested flight training. After nine months, Hoskins completed school at Naval Air Station Pensacola and was designated a naval aviator in September 1925.

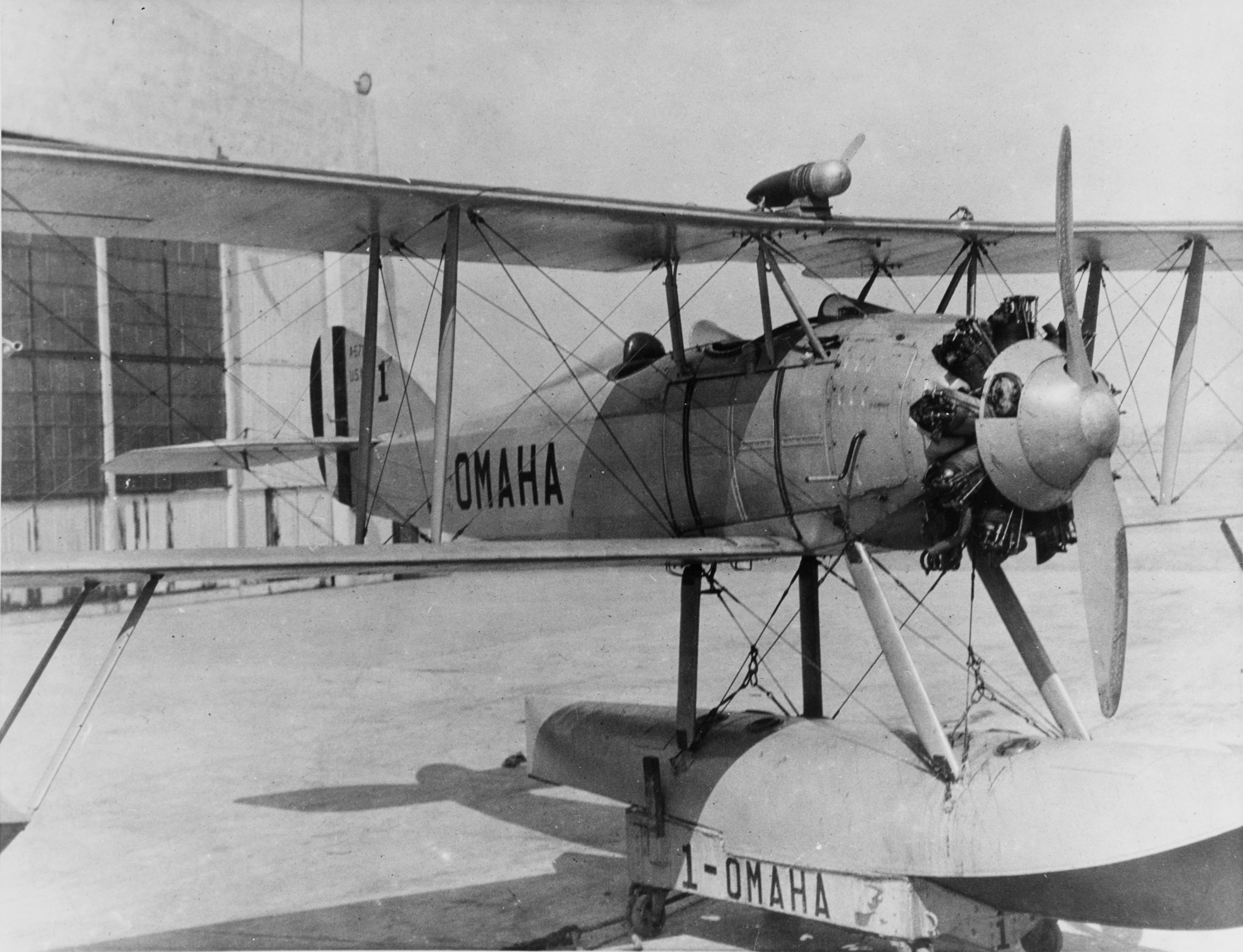
A Vought UO-1 floatplane assigned to USS Omaha (CL-4)

Hoskins joined cruisier USS Memphis (CL-13) in November, flying catapult-launched Vought VE-9 and UO-1 floatplanes as a member of Observation Squadron 3. Memphis was the flagship of the commander of European forces, and Hoskins was chosen to demonstrate launching procedures for a royal audience including the King of Norway, the King of Spain, and the Duke of Gloucester. Hoskins served aboard Memphis during its June 1927 cruise from Cherbourg to Washington, D.C. transporting Charles Lindbergh and his plane the Spirit of St. Louis after his solo successful crossing of the Atlantic Ocean.

Hoskins returned to NAS Pensacola in 1928 to serve as instructor, then after a year was assigned to command the Naval Reserve Aviation Base at Great Lakes, Illinois. He was promoted Lieutenant in 1931 and served as air officer with Scouting Squadron 6 of USS Omaha (CL-4) until 1934, again flying floatplanes. Hoskins then returned to Great Lakes, serving on the staff of commandant, Ninth Naval District, Great Lakes until 1936. Hoskins next served with Scouting Squadron 4 aboard carriers USS Langley (CV-1) and USS Saratoga (CV-3), becoming squadron commander in 1937, transferring that spring to USS Ranger, the first purpose-built U.S. Navy aircraft carrier.

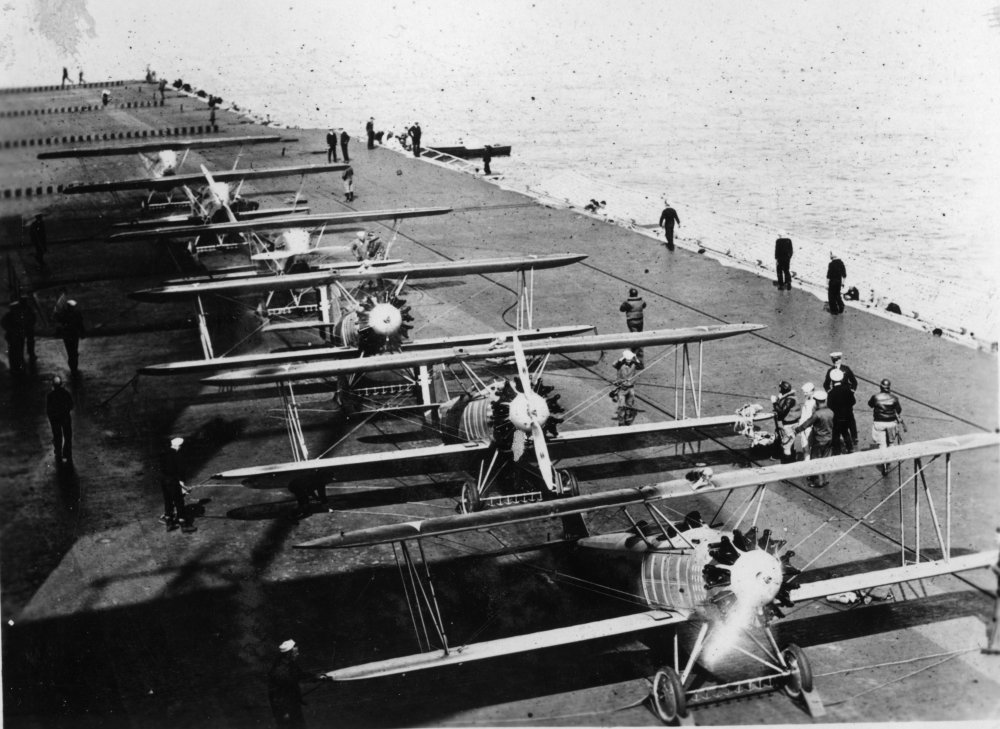
Vought SU-4 observation planes lined up for carrier take off.

On July 2, 1937, aviator Amelia Earhart failed to arrive at Howland Island as scheduled during her second attempt to be the first woman to circumnavigate the globe by air. Hoskins was seconded to USS Lexington's air group, commanding nine SU-4 aircraft during the unprecedented and unsuccessful search. One newspaper reported the size of the Lexington air search area as "a rectangle of sea approximately 600 miles by 400 miles." A commemorative postcard in the collection of the National Naval Aviation Museum records Lexington's search group as having "...steamed about 11,000 miles and searched 200,000 square miles with no casualties while conducting the largest and most extensive mass search in naval peacetime history...".

Hoskins instructed at NAS Pensacola from June 1938 to May 1940, after which he was promoted to Lieutenant Commander and rejoined Ranger, then on duty with the Atlantic Fleet. In November, Ranger escorted 20,000 Canadian troops convoy leaving Halifax, Nova Scotia. Hoskins became Ranger's air officer in April 1941. Steaming exclusively in the Atlantic during his pre-war service on board, Ranger often served on neutrality patrol. Ranger operated out of Hampton Roads and was embarked with four air squadrons: VB-4, VF-4, VS-41, and VS-42. Between May 1941 and February 1942, Ranger made four deliveries of Curtis P-40 Warhawk aircraft transported from NAS Quonset Point to Accra.

=== World War II ===
When war was declared against Japan and Germany on December 8, 1941, Ranger continued transporting needed P-40 fighters to Africa; in June 1942, Hoskins assumed the duties of executive officer. Operation Torch, the occupation of North Africa, utilized Ranger as a platform to launch dive bombers, torpedo planes and fighters for air cover. According to a congratulatory statement made by their commanding officer, on the first day of action, November 8, Ranger launched 203 flights against Vichy and other enemy targets on land, sea, and air. The carrier dodged a torpedo attack from Vichy submarine Le Tonnant, but Ranger's air groups shot down 16 enemy aircraft and sank three submarines during successful operations with no losses in men or aircraft.

In 1943, "Uncle John" was assigned to Washington, D.C. and was later Chief of Staff to the commander of Fleet Air, Quonset Point, Rhode Island, where both American and British pilots were trained in carrier flight techniques and tactics. Captain Hoskins was awarded the Legion of Merit for his service at Quonset Point. His citation described his crucial work at the naval air station: "...preparing training syllabi and schedules for all types of carrier aircraft, supervising the training of officers in landing signal duties and directing the indoctrination and training of carrier aircraft service division personnel." Hoskins's extensive previous experience at the cutting edge of wartime carrier air operations and vast familiarity with naval air capability and equipment made Hoskins an excellent choice to influence both training and operational programs. Further, "His expert professional skill, outstanding leadership and initiative were contributing factors in the development and maintenance of the high operational readiness of carrier air groups and squadrons destined for vital operation from aircraft carriers..." in all theaters of naval air operations.

In 1944, Hoskins was ordered to take over command of USS Princeton; he arrived to relieve his friend Capt. William H. Buracker just as the Battle of Leyte Gulf was commencing, and postponed taking command due to the hostilities. At roughly 10:00 on October 24, Princeton was attacked by a Yokosuka D4Y "Judy" which dropped its single bomb directly through the flight and hangar decks, igniting gasoline stores, disabling fire suppression systems and causing secondary explosions. After battling the fires for some hours, Buracker ordered Princeton abandoned, leaving behind only a salvage crew; Hoskins offered to stay behind. At 15:24, a massive explosion of ordnance stores blew off a large section of the carrier's stern, killing many and severing Hoskins's right leg just above the ankle. After Princeton sank, Capt. Hoskins was recovered by a PBY Catalina and flown to medical care in time to save his life, an experience which would color his later air service.

=== Peg-leg admiral ===
Hoskins refused to allow his wound to force his premature exit from the Navy, asserting his fitness to visiting friend Admiral William Halsey: "... the Navy doesn't expect a man to think with his feet. That blast didn't knock off my head." Recovering in the Naval Hospital Philadelphia, Hoskins's rank allowed him to choose the location of his hospital bed, which he selected for its view of the naval shipyard where the next USS Princeton was being laid down. While rehabilitating, he received both the Purple Heart and Navy Cross for his actions aboard Princeton. Fitted with a prosthetic foot, Hoskins started a vigorous exercise program, including paying visits to the shipyard to oversee construction of the new Essex-class carrier. After the surrender of Japan and the end of World War II, Princeton was commissioned in November 1945, and Hoskins was her first commanding officer. A year later, he was promoted to rear admiral and given command of Carrier Division Seventeen. Air Group 81, formerly from Princeton, asked Walt Disney to design a mascot patch, "a saber-slinging pirate with an aircraft carrier under one arm and a peg leg firing ammunition like a machine gun", and were for a time known as Peg-Leg Petes.

As someone who had overseen the training of Navy pilots, Hoskins became an advocate of carrier-based jets.

=== Korean War ===
After two years as chief of staff to Commander, Naval Air Forces Pacific Fleet, Hoskins was ordered to command Carrier Division 3, centered around another Essex-class carrier USS Valley Forge, and deployed to the South China Sea. Valley Forge was anchored in Victoria Harbour, Hong Kong when on June 25, 1950, Hoskins was notified of the North Korean Army's massive attack across the 38th parallel precipitating the Korean War. Hoskins quickly moved his force to Naval Station Subic Bay for fueling and resupply and by July 3 was launching the first carrier-based air strikes of the conflict. He used Douglas AD Skyraiders and Vought F4U Corsairs to attack Pyongyang airfields, using his Grumman F9F-2 Panthers for fighter cover, suppressing North Korean air power and supporting the retreating South Koreans as U.S. ground forces arrived and deployed. By mid-August, Valley Forge's air groups were averaging 80 sorties each day, using every minute of sunlight to hit "everything from oil refineries to horse carts."

"Uncle John" Hoskins featured on cover of Life magazine, August 14, 1950

Life magazine sent correspondents to the conflict and on August 14, 1950, put "Uncle John" Hoskins on the cover and profiled his career at some length. The article made much of Hoskins's "homely" language, his excellent relationship with the officers and men serving under him, and his pragmatic and dogmatic approach to the mission. Hoskins complimented the extraordinary interservice teamwork: "You can't say enough about the fine cooperation and coordination we have with the Air Force." He also praised the efforts of his carrier division, saying "It's wonderful to manage a team when every player gets a hit every time he comes to the plate."

After helping to protect the Pusan perimeter, Hoskins and his carrier division were instrumental in the success of Douglas MacArthur's end-around amphibious assault on Inchon a month later. On September 4, fighters of Valley Forge's Fighter Squadron 53 (VF-53) shot down a Soviet Air Force A-20 Havoc bomber after it opened fire on them while flying towards the gathering naval task force in the Yellow Sea. During the invasion at Inchon from September 14 until September 19, Hoskins's Air Group 5 made hundreds of daily strikes on enemy targets. Between July 3 and November 19, Valley Forge aircraft flew 5,000 sorties and delivered 2,000 tons of rockets and bombs.

Valley Forge was slated for overhaul and was heading towards its base in San Diego when Hoskins was notified of the Second Phase Offensive launched in the last week of November by the Chinese Army in support of the North Korean effort. After arriving on the west coast of the U.S. on December 1, Hoskins was directed to resupply and steam back to Korea as soon as possible. Valley Forge spent five days restocking and embarking a new air group. She departed for Korea on December 6, arrived on the 22nd, and began air operations in support of the UN retreat the next day. By the time Valley Forge ended its second deployment in March 1951, its air groups had flown 2,580 sorties and dropped another 1,500 tons of ordnance.

Hoskins returned Valley Forge for overhaul in April 1951, and found himself assigned to the Air Force's Military Air Transport Service, coordinating logistics by air transport for all branches of service where he served until April 1954. Wartime MATS was often responsible for flying wounded service personnel to medical care, protecting life and often saving limbs. During his command, MATS operated for 36 months and over 75 million passenger miles without a single fatality.

Hoskins was later decorated with the Distinguished Service Medal for his command efforts at the outset of the Korean War and the Silver Star (Army award) for his "gallantry and intrepidity" as commander of his division during the Inchon-Seoul operation.

=== Later service ===
Hoskins returned again to Quonset by April 1954, this time as Commander Fleet Air and served until retired in 1957. During his command at Quonset, Hoskins chaired the board of inquiry into the May 26, 1954 disaster on the USS Bennington (CV-20).

In 1955 Republic Pictures released The Eternal Sea, a biopic taken from Hoskins's life and written by Allen Rivkin after a story by William Wister Haines. The film featured Sterling Hayden as Hoskins, Alexis Smith as his wife Sue, Dean Jagger as his friend Thomas Semple, Hayden Rorke as William Buracker and Virginia Grey as Dorothy Buracker. The New York Times noted John H. Auer's "deceptively simple direction". The reviewer especially praised "... some of the best and most unobtrusive photography of aircraft carrier scenes ever made".

Upon retirement, Hoskins was promoted to vice admiral. He later served for five years as director of the Office of Declassification Policy in the Department of Defense, managing the activity of declassifying formerly classified materials for public release.

Hoskins had a heart attack and died at his home in Falls Church, Virginia, on March 30, 1964. His funeral was held at the chapel at Fort Myer and he was buried with full military honors at Arlington National Cemetery. Hoskins and his wife Sue (née Waters) had two sons and one daughter.
