= Pineville, Kentucky =

- City
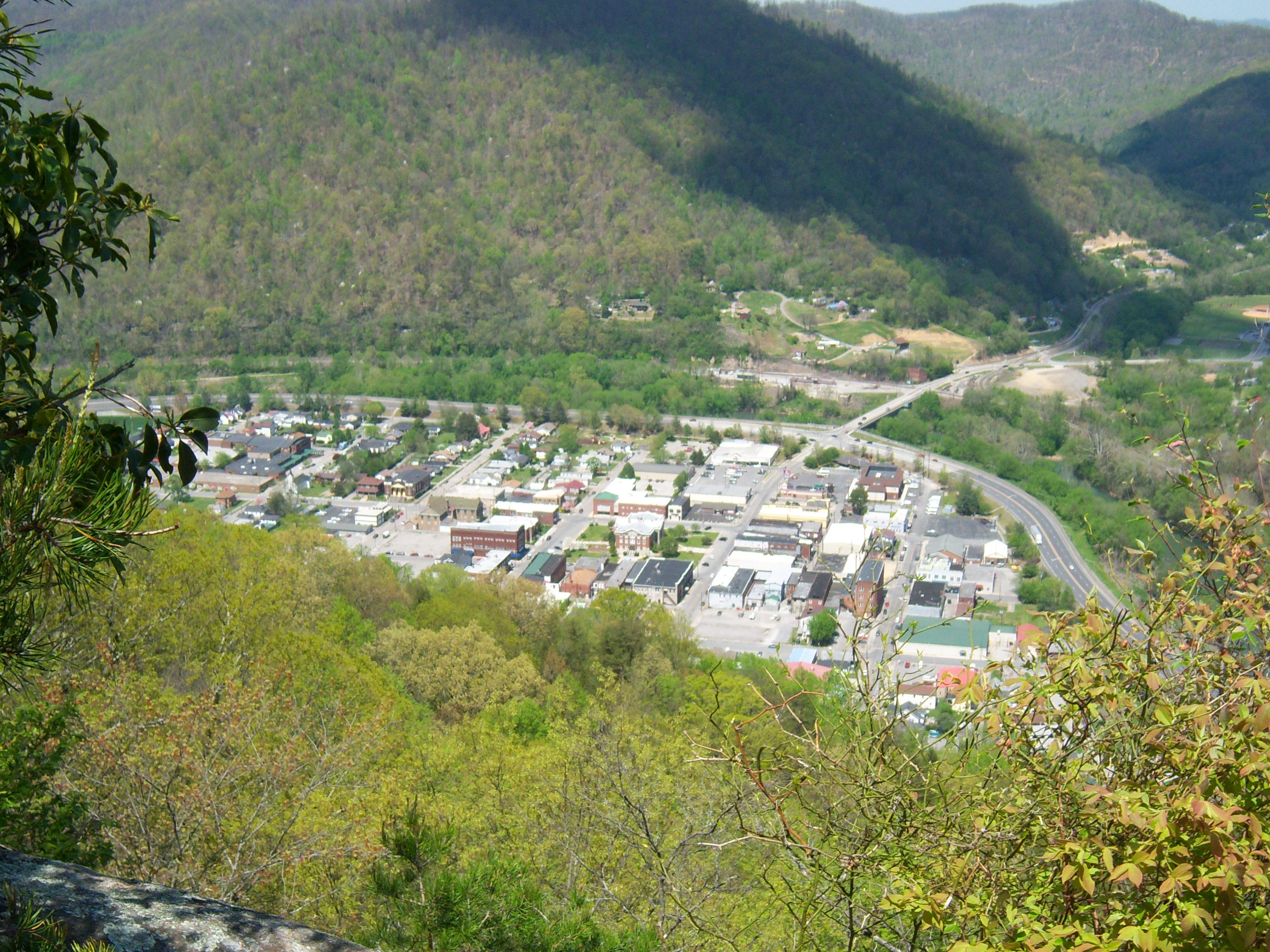
- Pineville, as seen from atop Pine Mountain

- Seal
- Nickname: The Gem City of the Cumberlands
- Motto: Welcome Home
- Location of Pineville in Bell County, Kentucky.
- Coordinates: 36°45′47″N 83°41′58″W
- Country: United States
- State: Kentucky
- County: Bell
- Established: 1781
- Incorporated: March 26, 1873
- Named for: its local forests

Government
  - Type: Mayor-Council
  - Mayor: Shawn Fugate II

Area
  - Total: 3.49 sq mi (9.03 km^{2})
  - Land: 3.37 sq mi (8.74 km^{2})
  - Water: 0.11 sq mi (0.29 km^{2})
- Elevation: 1,014 ft (309 m)

Population (2020)
  - Total: 1,678
  - Estimate (2022): 1,630
  - Density: 497.5/sq mi (192.07/km^{2})
- Time zone: UTC-5 (Eastern (EST))
  - Summer (DST): UTC-4 (EDT)
- ZIP code: 40977
- Area code: 606
- FIPS code: 21-61248
- GNIS feature ID: 0500726
- Website: thecityofpineville.com

Pineville (locally /ˈpaɪnvəl, -vɪl/) is a home rule-class city in Bell County, Kentucky, United States. It is the seat of its county. The population was 1,678 as of the 2020 census. It is located on a small strip of land between the Cumberland River and Pine Mountain.

== History ==
Pineville is one of the oldest settlements in Kentucky, located at the crossing of the Cumberland River by the Wilderness Road. It was established as Cumberland Ford in 1781 and formed part of Governor Isaac Shelby's land tracts. When Bell County was formed in 1867, Cumberland Ford was formally laid off; local landowner J.J. Gibson's 1869 land grant permitted it to be selected as the county seat, but the courthouse was not completed until 1871. The settlement was renamed "Pineville" in 1870 and formally incorporated in 1873.

One of the earliest branches of the Sojourner Truth Woman's Christian Temperance Union (WCTU) was formed in Pineville in 1906 with 15 members - at the time, it was affiliated with the white women's branch of the Kentucky WCTU.

Its riverside location has made it subject to flooding, including a devastating incident on April 4, 1977, in which a floodwall built in 1952 was overwhelmed and 200 houses were destroyed or damaged. The U.S. Army Corps of Engineers upgraded the floodwall in 1988.

The economy is dependent on the coal mining industry, local family owned businesses and on tourism. Many enjoy visiting Pine Mountain State Resort Park, where the popular attraction "Chained Rock" is located. Thanks to works done by the community organization Main Street Pineville, the town is working on revitalizing downtown Pineville to its historical roots.

Every Memorial Day weekend (from Wednesday to Sunday) the town of Pineville welcomes all to the Kentucky Mountain Laurel Festival, named for the Mountain Laurel flower which grows wild on Pine Mountain. The first Kentucky Mountain Laurel Festival was presented in 1931 at the suggestion of Annie Walker Burns, a descendant of Dr. Thomas Walker, the first European to enter Kentucky and who, along with a party of explorers, visited the present site of Pineville in 1750. Burns was captivated by the history and beauty surrounding Pineville and appealed to Governor Flem D. Sampson of Barbourville to initiate some type of event to honor Dr. Walker. She gained the support of other influential Bell Countians, and the 1931 Festival was staged at Clear Creek Springs on June 4.

== Geography ==
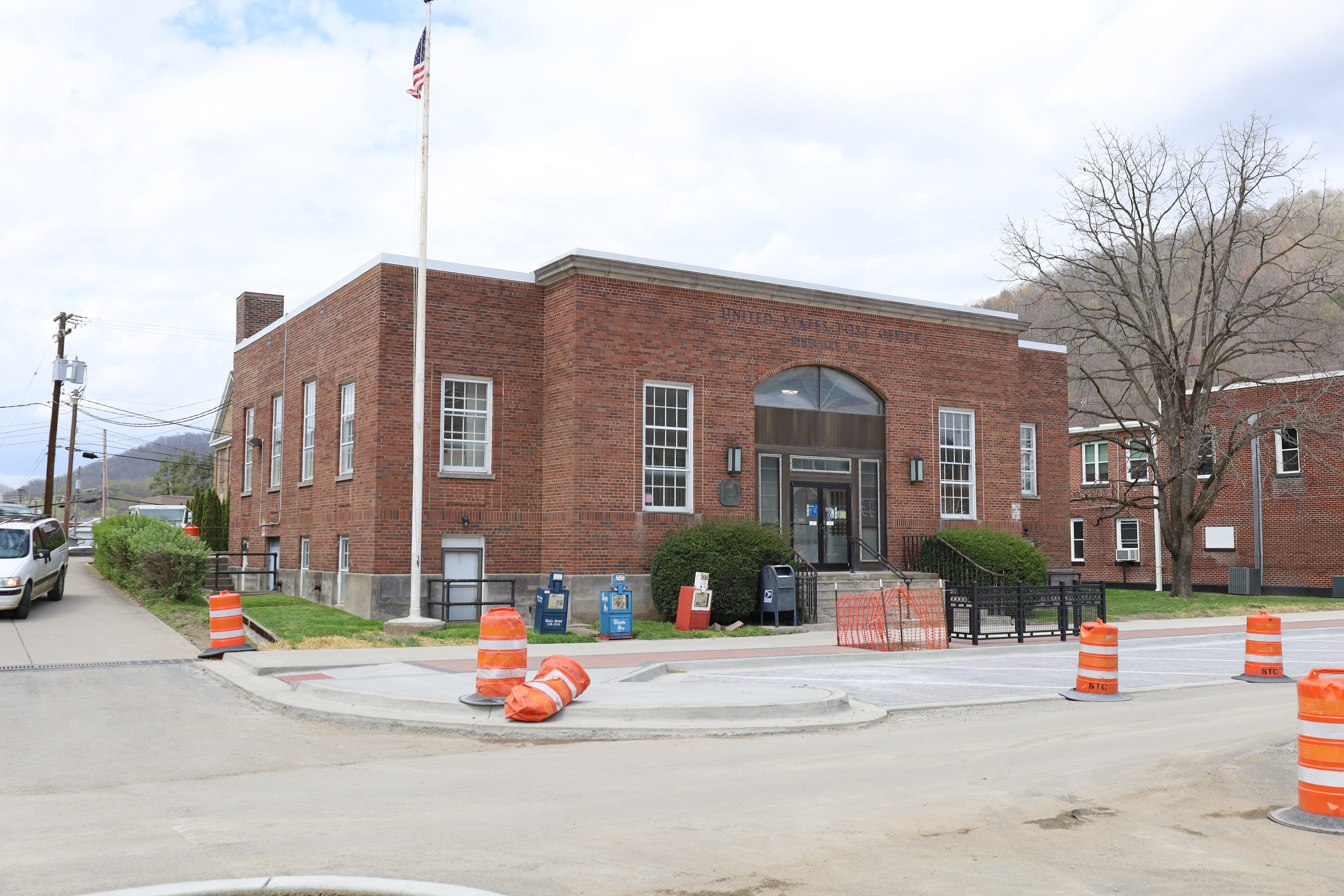
Pineville Post Office in 2025

Pineville is located in northern Bell County at 36°45′43″N 83°41′42″W (36.7620301, −83.6949176), along the Cumberland River, directly north of its water gap through Pine Mountain. U.S. Route 25E passes through the city, intersecting Kentucky Route 66 in downtown. U.S. Route 119 has its southern terminus at US 25E near the southern border of the city. By US 25E, it is 12 miles (19 km) south to Middlesboro and the north entrance of the Cumberland Gap tunnel, and it is 33 miles (53 km) northwest to Corbin and Interstate 75. US 119 leads 30 miles (48 km) northeast to Harlan.

According to the U.S. Census Bureau, Pineville covers a total land area of 1.7 square miles (4.5 km^{2}), of which 1.7 square miles (4.3 km^{2}) is land and 0.12 square miles (0.3 km^{2}), or 5.54%, is water.

== Education ==
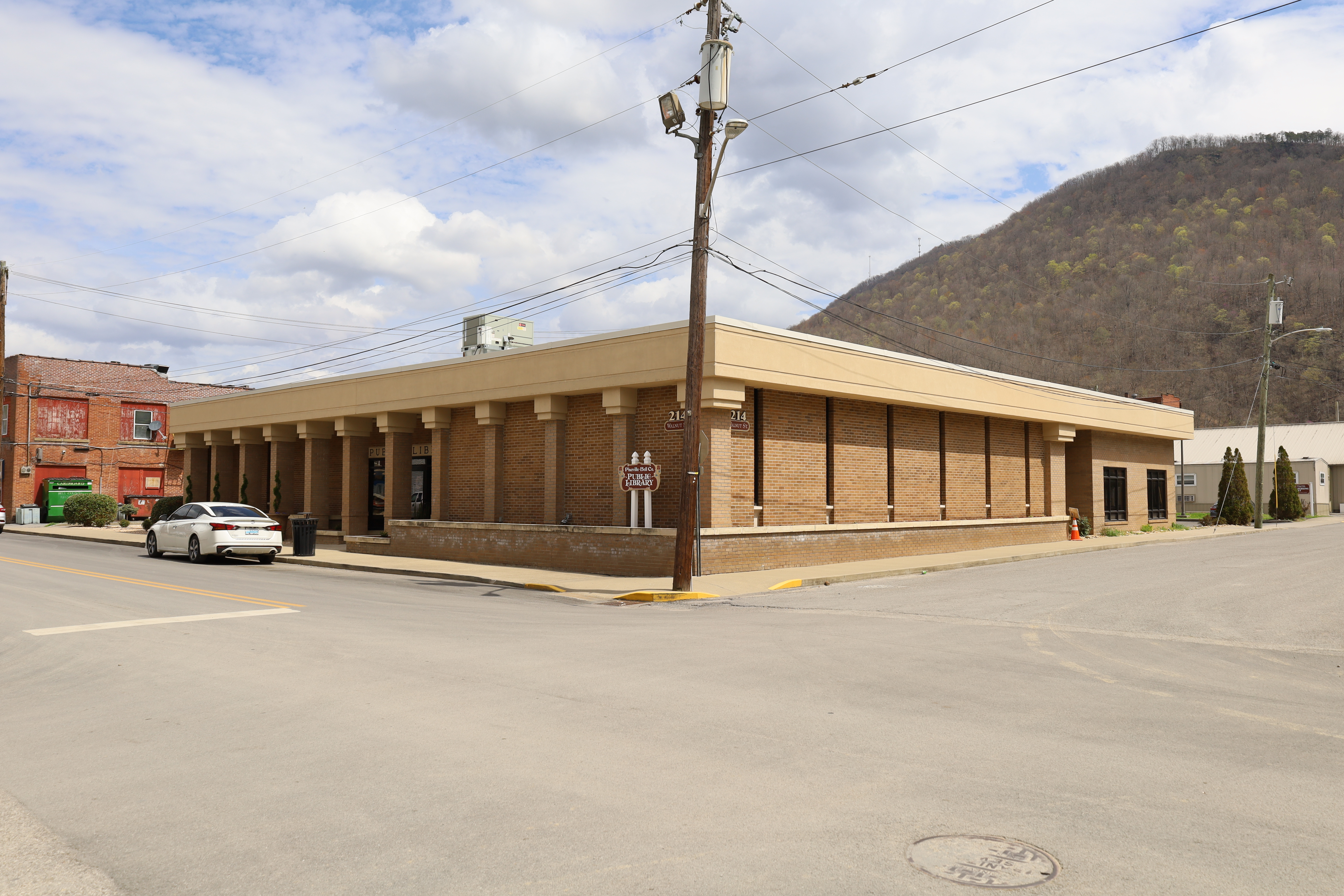
Pineville–Bell County Public Library in 2025

The city is served by Pineville Independent Schools. Schools located within the district include:

- Pineville High School
- Pineville Middle School
- Pineville Elementary School

Southeast Kentucky Community and Technical College maintains a campus in Pineville, serving as the only post-secondary education institution in the city. However Clear Creek Baptist Bible College is located in Pineville's zip code and is located south of the city.

Pineville has a public library, a branch of the Bell County Public Library District.

== Demographics ==
Historical population
Census	Pop.	Note	%±
1880	83		—
1900	2,072		—
1910	2,161		4.3%
1920	2,908		34.6%
1930	3,567		22.7%
1940	3,882		8.8%
1950	3,890		0.2%
1960	3,181		−18.2%
1970	2,817		−11.4%
1980	2,599		−7.7%
1990	2,198		−15.4%
2000	2,093		−4.8%
2010	1,732		−17.2%
2020	1,678		−3.1%
2022 (est.)	1,630		−2.9%
U.S. Decennial Census

=== 2020 census ===
As of the 2020 census, Pineville had a population of 1,678. The median age was 43.3 years. 20.5% of residents were under the age of 18 and 18.0% of residents were 65 years of age or older. For every 100 females there were 100.2 males, and for every 100 females age 18 and over there were 96.2 males age 18 and over.

0.0% of residents lived in urban areas, while 100.0% lived in rural areas.

There were 742 households in Pineville, of which 28.2% had children under the age of 18 living in them. Of all households, 30.9% were married-couple households, 25.1% were households with a male householder and no spouse or partner present, and 39.2% were households with a female householder and no spouse or partner present. About 43.1% of all households were made up of individuals and 15.8% had someone living alone who was 65 years of age or older.

There were 856 housing units, of which 13.3% were vacant. The homeowner vacancy rate was 2.8% and the rental vacancy rate was 8.7%.

Racial composition as of the 2020 census
Race	Number	Percent
White	1,562	93.1%
Black or African American	42	2.5%
American Indian and Alaska Native	5	0.3%
Asian	5	0.3%
Native Hawaiian and Other Pacific Islander	0	0.0%
Some other race	14	0.8%
Two or more races	50	3.0%
Hispanic or Latino (of any race)	14	0.8%

=== 2000 census ===
As of the census of 2000, there were 2,093 people, 871 households, and 518 families residing in the city. The population density was 1,452.1 inhabitants per square mile (560.7/km^{2}). There were 961 housing units at an average density of about 667 units per square mile (258 units/km^{2}). The racial makeup of the city was 92.74% White, 4.30% African American, 0.24% Native American, 0.24% Asian, 0.14% from other races, and 2.34% from two or more races. Hispanic or Latino of any race were 0.91% of the population.

There were 871 households, out of which 27.6% had children under the age of 18 living with them, 34.6% were married couples living together, 20.8% had a female householder with no husband present, and 40.5% were non-families. 38.6% of all households were made up of individuals, and 20.1% had someone living alone who was 65 years of age or older. The average household size was 2.17 and the average family size was 2.90.

In the city, the population was spread out, with 22.5% under the age of 18, 8.6% from 18 to 24, 24.2% from 25 to 44, 24.9% from 45 to 64, and 19.8% who were 65 years of age or older. The median age was 40 years. For every 100 females, there were 82.0 males. For every 100 females age 18 and over, there were 76.1 males.

The median income for a household in the city was $12,435, and the median income for a family was $20,625. Males had a median income of $24,125 versus $23,229 for females. The per capita income for the city was $12,692. About 37.1% of families and 44.2% of the population were below the poverty line, including 58.8% of those under age 18 and 30.0% of those age 65 or over.

== The Kentucky Mountain Laurel Festival ==
The Kentucky Mountain Laurel Festival began in 1931 and has been held annually except for during WWII (1942–1947). Mountain Laurel is a shrub with large clusters of small pale pink flowers that grows wild in the mountains of Appalachia. The Mountain Laurel Festival is deeply rooted in southern tradition, mountain heritage and held dear to all natives of Pineville. The 85th Festival was held during May 20–24, 2015.

The Kentucky Mountain Laurel Festival includes a Concert, carnival, Appalachian crafts, local talent, a Gala Parade and a beauty pageant. Senior girls from local High Schools compete for the title of the Mountain Laurel Princess. Queen Candidates, young women chosen to represent their respective Universities in Kentucky are welcomed into the homes of Pineville citizens in the truest form of Southern Hospitality. Throughout the weekend, the women are judged secretly based on the standards of a Southern Lady.

On Saturday after the Parade, a Coronation begins in the Laurel Cove, a natural amphitheater in the Pine Mountain State Park. Each Queen candidate must curtsy before the Governor as the audience dressed in formal attire, many wearing hats similar to those worn at the Kentucky Derby claps and 'ahhs' at the dresses. Then with a procession of the miniature and high school Courts, the Queen is named. She is then crowned by the Governor of Kentucky with a tiara made of live, pink Mountain Laurels. That night a 'Grand March' occurs, the Queens and their escorts dance together after recognizing their new Kentucky Mountain Laurel Festival Queen.

== See also ==
- Bell County, Kentucky
- Bell County High School
- Clear Creek Baptist Bible College
- Kentucky Route 2014 Bridge
- Pine Mountain State Resort Park
- Middlesborough, KY Micropolitan Statistical Area

== Climate ==
The climate in this area is characterized by hot, humid summers and generally mild to cool winters. According to the Köppen Climate Classification system, Pineville has a humid subtropical climate, abbreviated "Cfa" on climate maps.

== Notable people ==
- Dale Ann Bradley, Grammy-nominated singer/musician
- George Blowers, banker
- John Hoskins, rear admiral in the United States Navy
- Rodney McMullen, businessman; CEO of The Kroger Company
- Reid Patterson, swimmer
- Joseph Chilton Pearce, author and lecturer
- Shanda Sharer, murder victim
- Brian O'Brien, radio host and prank call victim
