= Laurel Creek Gorge Bridge =

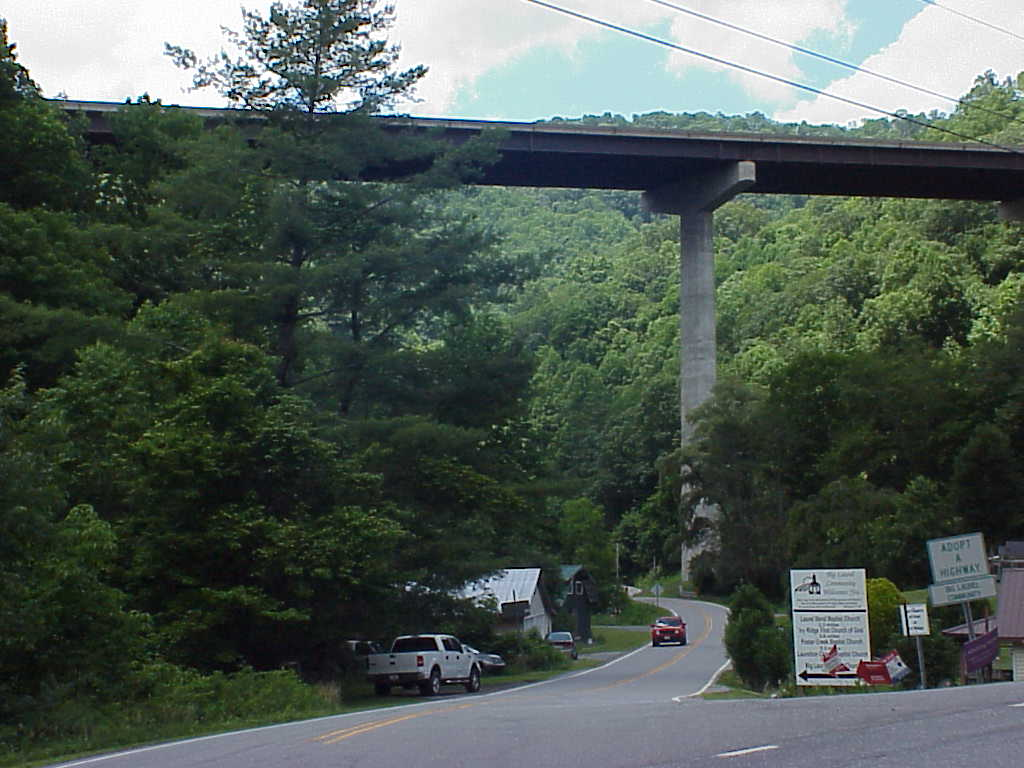
- Coordinates: 35.91704°N 82.55788°W
- Carries: 6 general purpose lanes of I-26 / US 23
- Crosses: Laurel Creek
- Locale: Mars Hill, North Carolina
- Maintained by: North Carolina Department of Transportation

Characteristics
- Design: continuous steel plate girder bridge
- Total length: 1,000 ft (300 m)
- Height: 220 ft (67 m)

History
- Opening: 2002

The Laurel Creek Gorge Bridge is a continuous steel plate girder bridge that spans Laurel Creek on Interstate 26/U.S. Route 23 between Asheville, North Carolina and Johnson City, Tennessee. It is the second tallest bridge in North Carolina—after the Peter Guice Memorial Bridge—with a deck height of 220 ft (67 m). Construction of the bridge was finished in 2002. Due to its proximity to the higher mountains and its elevation of over 3000', the highway in this area is subject to heavy snow and icing. The bridge design incorporates a special system which sprays de-icing liquid onto the bridge deck whenever icing is detected.

The section of I-26 from U.S. Route 19 to the border with Tennessee was designated a scenic highway by the North Carolina Board of Transportation.

== See also ==
- List of bridges in the United States by height
