= Peter Guice Memorial Bridge =

- Coordinates: 35.27389°N 82.37389°W
- Carries: I-26 / US 74
- Crosses: Green River
- Locale: Henderson County
- Named for: Peter Guice
- Owner: NCDOT
- Maintained by: NCDOT

Characteristics
- Design: Steel continuous, girder and floorbeam system
- Total length: 1,050 feet (320 m)
- Width: 28 feet (8.5 m)
- Height: 225 feet (69 m)

History
- Construction end: 1968
- Construction cost: $3.8 million
- Opened: 1972
- Replaces: Howard Gap Rd Toll Bridge II

Statistics
- Daily traffic: 44,500 (2019)

Location
- Interactive map of Peter Guice Memorial Bridge

The Peter Guice Memorial Bridge consists of dual two-lane automobile bridges carrying I-26/US 74 across the Green River, located between East Flat Rock and Saluda, in Henderson County, North Carolina. Surpassed only by the Phil G. McDonald Bridge in West Virginia and the Emlenton Bridge in Pennsylvania, it is the third-highest bridge carrying an Interstate Highway in the eastern United States at 225 feet (69 m) tall. Each bridge is 1,050 feet (320 m) long and 28 feet (8.5 m) wide, with two 12-foot (3.7 m) travel lanes and 2-foot (0.61 m) shoulders. In 1993, both bridges were rehabilitated after missing welds and poor welds were found in the structures.

As of July 2018, both bridges are rated structurally deficient and functionally obsolete in the National Bridge Inventory. A major rehabilitation project for the bridges began in 2021. As of March 2026, construction is ongoing, but nearly finished.

The bridge is dedicated to the memory of Peter Guice, who built the first toll bridge over the Green River in 1820; it replaced a hazardous ford along Howard Gap Road. An unrecorded flood washed out the toll bridge, but was replaced by his son; the second toll bridge was destroyed by flood in 1916. The current bridge is located high above where the former bridges once stood.

== See also ==
- List of bridges in the United States by height
