= Emlenton Bridge =

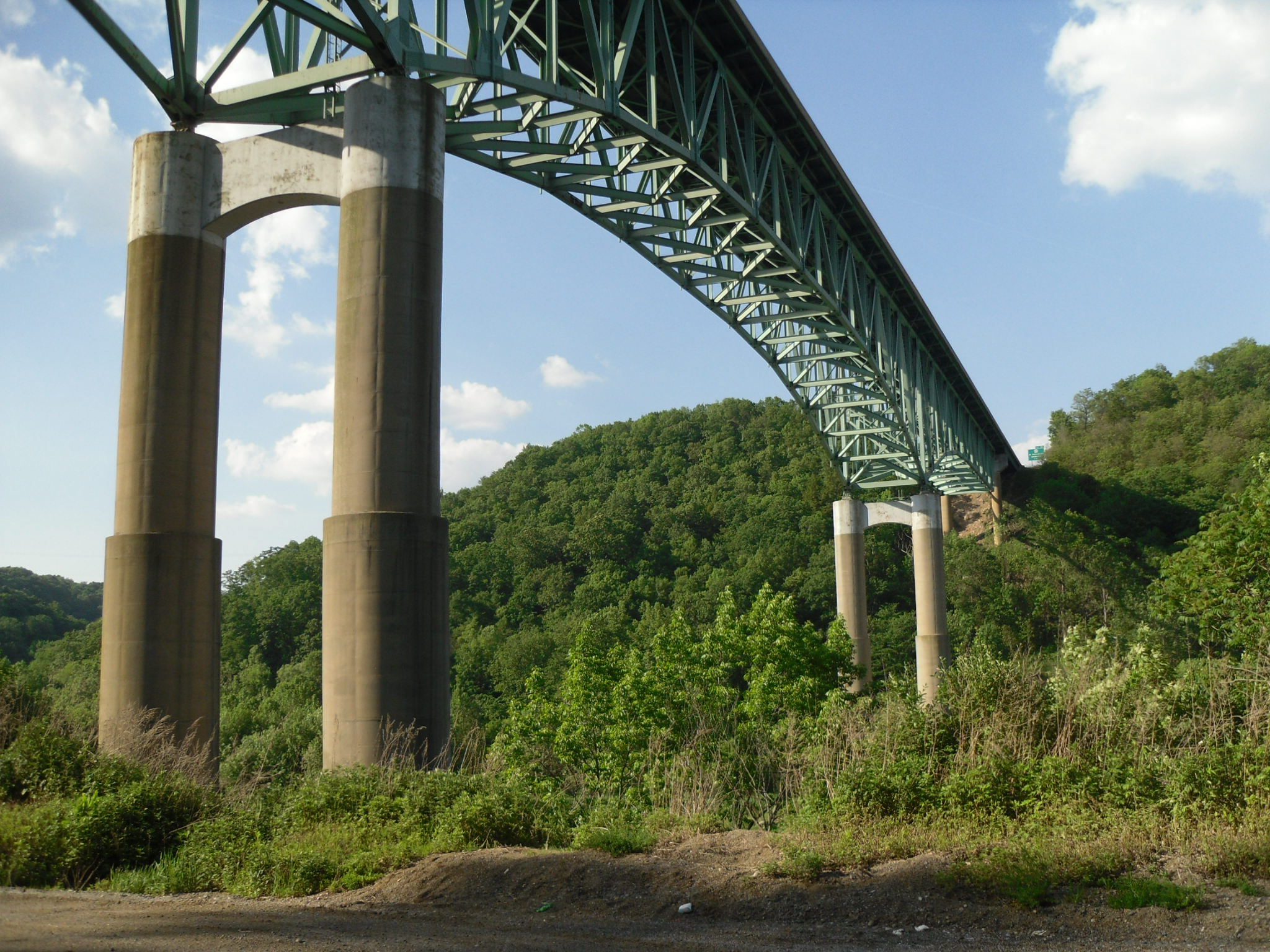
- Interstate 80 at Emlenton Bridge
- Coordinates: 41.1743°N 79.6975°W
- Carries: I-80
- Crosses: Allegheny River
- Locale: Emlenton, Pennsylvania, U.S.
- Maintained by: Pennsylvania Department of Transportation

Characteristics
- Design: Truss bridge
- Material: Steel
- Total length: 1,668 feet (508 m)
- Width: 4 lanes
- Longest span: 165 m
- Clearance below: 270 feet (82 m)

History
- Opened: 1968

Location
- Interactive map of Emlenton Bridge

The Emlenton Bridge is a steel-deck truss bridge that spans the Allegheny River just south of the town of Emlenton, Pennsylvania, United States at approximately mile marker 44.4 on I-80. With a height of 270 feet (82 m) above the river, the Emlenton Bridge was the highest bridge in the Interstate Highway System when completed in 1968 (The Lewiston–Queenston Bridge is higher but is technically an international bridge, not part of the Interstate Highway system). This record was held until 1971 with the opening of the Fred G. Redmon Bridge near Selah, Washington.

The Emlenton Bridge remains the highest road bridge in Pennsylvania; with an overall span of 1,668 feet (508 m) it was the largest bridge constructed as part of the Keystone Shortway project. With the completion of the Interstate System, it is likely that the Emlenton Bridge will remain the sixth-highest bridge in the system for a significant time, behind the Glade Creek Bridge in West Virginia, the Pine Valley Creek Bridge in California, the Galena Creek Bridge in Nevada, the aforementioned Redmon Bridge, and the Mike O'Callaghan–Pat Tillman Memorial Bridge between Nevada and Arizona.

The bridge was designed by the consultant Buchart-Horn led by Ted Andrzejewski, an acquaintance of the noted bridge engineer Ralph Modjeski. The contractor of record is Brodhead Construction located in Aliquippa, Pennsylvania.

The Emlenton Bridge is actually located in three different Pennsylvania counties due to its size and the geography of the land. One side of the bridge is in Venango County, the other is in Clarion County, and the southwest abutment resides in Butler County.

== See also ==
- List of crossings of the Allegheny River
- List of bridges in the United States by height
