= List of bridges in the United States by height =

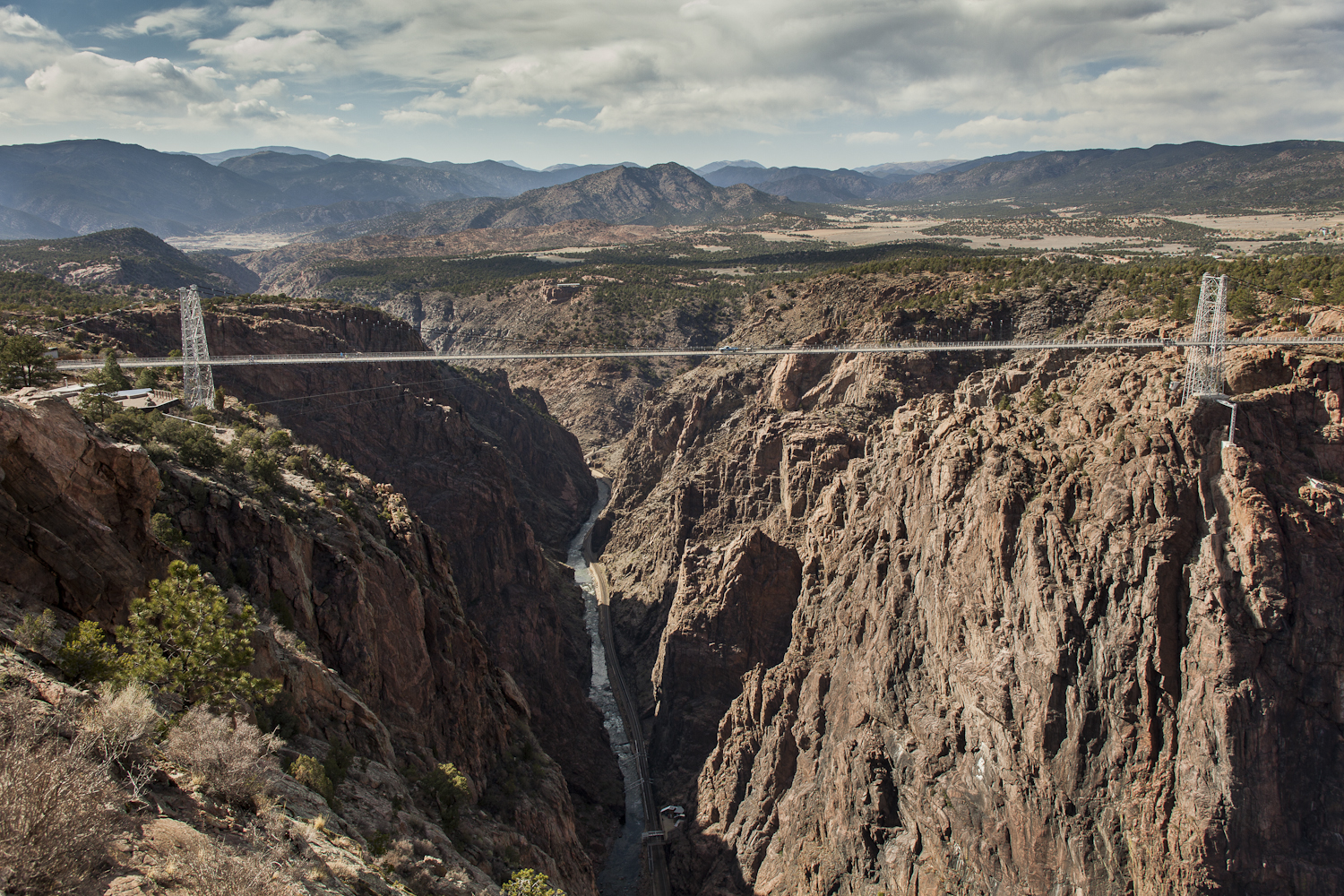
Royal Gorge Bridge, highest bridge in the United States

This is a list of the highest bridges in the United States by height over land or water.

== Definitions ==
Height in this list refers to the distance from the bridge deck to the lowest point on the land, or the water surface, directly below. A bridge's deck height is greater than its clearance below, which is measured from the bottom of the deck structure, with the difference being equal to the thickness of the deck structure at the point with the greatest clearance below. Official figures for a bridge's height are often provided only for the clearance below, so those figures may be used instead of actual deck height measurements. For bridges that span tidal water, the clearance below is measured at the average high water level.

The minimum height for inclusion in this list is 130 ft (40 m), which may be either the deck height or the clearance below depending on available references. Note that the following types of bridges are not included in this list: demolished high bridges; historic high bridges such as those over reservoirs—regardless of current reservoir levels—that were filled after the bridge was complete, unless the dam has since been removed; and vertical-lift bridges, even those with raised span heights greater than this list's minimum height.

== List of bridges ==
Most of the bridges in this list derive their height from crossing between the rims of a deep canyon. Some others cross navigation channels and are designed with a deck clearance that can accommodate oceangoing vessels, such as container ships, ocean liners and cruise ships. The largest of these is around 220 feet (67 m), so there are often bridges with approximately that height located in coastal cities with bays or inlets, such as New York City's Verrazzano–Narrows Bridge and San Francisco's Golden Gate Bridge.

Height	Name	Spans	Completed	State(s)
955 ft (291.1 m)	Royal Gorge Bridge	Arkansas River	1929	Colorado pedestrian only bridge
900 ft (274.3 m)	Mike O'Callaghan–Pat Tillman Memorial Bridge	Colorado River	2010	Arizona / Nevada
876 ft (267.0 m)	New River Gorge Bridge	New River	1977	West Virginia
730 ft (222.5 m)	Foresthill Bridge	American River	1973	California
700 ft (213.4 m)	Glen Canyon Dam Bridge	Colorado River	1959	Arizona
700 ft (213.4 m)	Phil G. McDonald Bridge (Glade Creek Bridge)	Glade Creek	1988	West Virginia
565 ft (172.2 m)	Rio Grande Gorge Bridge	Rio Grande	1965	New Mexico
486 ft (148.1 m)	Perrine Bridge	Snake River	1976	Idaho
470 ft (143.3 m)	Navajo Bridge (dual spans; the 1929 span is 467 ft high)	Colorado River	1929 / 1995	Arizona
464 ft (141.4 m)	Moyie River Canyon Bridge	Moyie River	1965	Idaho
450 ft (137.2 m)	Pine Valley Creek Bridge	Pine Valley Creek	1974	California
400 ft (121.9 m)	Cold Spring Canyon Arch Bridge	Cold Spring Canyon	1964	California
388 ft (118.3 m)	Burro Creek Bridge (dual spans) (Note: The americanbridge.net reference for Burro Creek Bridge provides a vertical clearance figure of 370 ft (113 m) which is 18 ft (5 m) lower than the deck heights for the two spans of this bridge as provided by highestbridges.com, the difference being due to the deck truss height.)	Burro Creek	1966 / 2005	Arizona
375 ft (114.3 m)	High Steel Bridge	Skokomish River	1929	Washington
370 ft (112.8 m)	Hoffstadt Creek Bridge	Hoffstadt Creek	1994	Washington
370 ft (112.8 m)	Lewiston–Queenston Bridge	Niagara River	1962	New York / Ontario (Canada)
350 ft (106.7 m)	Hansen Bridge	Snake River	1966	Idaho
347 ft (105.8 m)	Vance Creek Bridge	Vance Creek	1929	Washington
345 ft (105.2 m)	Thomas Creek Bridge	Thomas Creek	1961	Oregon
325 ft (99.1 m)	Fred G. Redmon Bridge	Selah Creek	1971	Washington
320 ft (97.5 m)	Crooked River Railroad Bridge	Crooked River	1911	Oregon
300 ft (91.4 m)	Rex T. Barber Veterans Memorial Bridge	Crooked River	2000	Oregon
300 ft (91.4 m)	Veterans Memorial Centennial Bridge	Bennett Bay	1991	Idaho
296 ft (90.2 m)	Hurricane Gulch Bridge	Hurricane Gulch	1921	Alaska
295 ft (89.9 m)	Crooked River High Bridge	Crooked River	1926	Oregon
295 ft (89.9 m)	Galena Creek Bridge	Galena Creek	2012	Nevada
285 ft (86.9 m)	Sunlight Creek Bridge	Sunlight Creek	1985	Wyoming
283 ft (86.3 m)	Young's High Bridge	Kentucky River	1889	Kentucky
275 ft (83.8 m)	High Bridge of Kentucky	Kentucky River	1877	Kentucky
275 ft (83.8 m)	Pecos River High Bridge	Pecos River	1944	Texas
273 ft (83.2 m)	Pecos River Highway Bridge	Pecos River	1957	Texas
270 ft (82.3 m)	Emlenton Bridge	Allegheny River	1968	Pennsylvania
265 ft (80.8 m)	Grassy Creek Bridge	Grassy Creek	2016	Kentucky / Virginia
260 ft (79.2 m)	Bixby Creek Bridge	Bixby Creek	1932	California
260 ft (79.2 m)	Conrad Lundy Jr. Bridge	Wind River	1957	Washington
255 ft (77.7 m)	Confusion Hill Bridges (south span)	South Fork Eel River	2009	California
250 ft (76.2 m)	Fairfax Bridge	Carbon River	1921	Washington
250 ft (76.2 m)	Mingo Creek Viaduct	Mingo Creek	2002	Pennsylvania
245 ft (74.7 m)	Clays Ferry Bridge	Kentucky River	1946 / 1963 / 1998	Kentucky
240 ft (73.2 m)	Genesee Arch Bridge	Genesee River	2017	New York
240 ft (73.2 m)	George Westinghouse Bridge	Turtle Creek	1932	Pennsylvania
240 ft (73.2 m)	Tunkhannock Viaduct	Tunkhannock Creek	1915	Pennsylvania
239 ft (72.8 m)	Jeremiah Morrow Bridge	Little Miami River	2016	Ohio
238 ft (72.5 m)	Kuskulana River Bridge	Kuskulana River	1910	Alaska
228 ft (69.5 m)	Verrazzano–Narrows Bridge	The Narrows	1964	New York
225 ft (68.6 m)	Peter Guice Memorial Bridge	Green River	1972	North Carolina
225 ft (68.6 m)	Whirlpool Rapids Bridge	Niagara River	1897	New York / Ontario (Canada)
220 ft (67.1 m)	Golden Gate Bridge	Golden Gate	1937	California
220 ft (67.1 m)	Laurel Creek Gorge Bridge	Laurel Creek	2002	North Carolina
220 ft (67.1 m)	San Francisco–Oakland Bay Bridge (western span)	San Francisco Bay	1936	California
215 ft (65.5 m)	Bayonne Bridge	Kill Van Kull	1931	New York / New Jersey
212 ft (64.6 m)	George Washington Bridge	Hudson River	1931	New York / New Jersey
212 ft (64.6 m)	Valley View Bridge	Cuyahoga Valley	1977	Ohio
212 ft (64.6 m)	Walkway over the Hudson	Hudson River	1889	New York
210 ft (64.0 m)	Lewis and Clark Bridge	Columbia River	1930	Oregon / Washington
206 ft (62.8 m)	Claiborne Pell Newport Bridge	Narragansett Bay	1969	Rhode Island
205 ft (62.5 m)	Long Beach International Gateway Bridge	Back Channel, Port of Long Beach	2020	California
205 ft (62.5 m)	St. Johns Bridge	Willamette River	1931	Oregon
204 ft (62.2 m)	Thomas Rukavina Memorial Bridge	Rouchleau Mine Pit	2017	Minnesota
203 ft (61.9 m)	Leo Frigo Memorial Bridge	Fox River	1981	Wisconsin
202 ft (61.6 m)	Rainbow Bridge	Niagara River	1941	New York / Ontario (Canada)
200 ft (61.0 m)	Hite Crossing Bridge	Colorado River	1966	Utah
200 ft (61.0 m)	Mackinac Bridge	Straits of Mackinac	1957	Michigan
200 ft (61.0 m)	Mon–Fayette Expressway Bridge	Monongahela River	2013	Pennsylvania
200 ft (61.0 m)	Red Cliff Bridge	Eagle River	1940	Colorado
200 ft (61.0 m)	San Diego–Coronado Bridge	San Diego Bay	1969	California
200 ft (61.0 m)	Tacoma Narrows Bridge (dual spans)	Tacoma Narrows	1950 / 2007	Washington
196 ft (59.7 m)	Astoria–Megler Bridge	Columbia River	1966	Oregon / Washington
192 ft (58.5 m)	Commodore Barry Bridge	Delaware River	1974	Pennsylvania / New Jersey
191 ft (58.2 m)	San Francisco–Oakland Bay Bridge (eastern span)	San Francisco Bay	2013	California
190 ft (57.9 m)	Hawk Falls Bridge	Mud Run	1957	Pennsylvania
190 ft (57.9 m)	Union Pacific Kate Shelley Bridge	Des Moines River	2009	Iowa
186 ft (56.7 m)	Arthur Ravenel Jr. Bridge	Cooper River	2005	South Carolina
186 ft (56.7 m)	Chesapeake Bay Bridge (dual spans)	Chesapeake Bay	1952 / 1973	Maryland
186 ft (56.7 m)	Goat Canyon Trestle	Goat Canyon	1933	California
185 ft (56.4 m)	Former Francis Scott Key Bridge	Patapsco River	1977	Maryland
185 ft (56.4 m)	Kate Shelley High Bridge (Boone Viaduct)	Des Moines River	1901	Iowa
185 ft (56.4 m)	Richmond–San Rafael Bridge	San Francisco Bay	1956	California
185 ft (56.4 m)	Sidney Lanier Bridge	Brunswick River	2003	Georgia
185 ft (56.4 m)	Talmadge Memorial Bridge	Savannah River	1991	Georgia
185 ft (56.4 m)	Vincent Thomas Bridge	Los Angeles Harbor	1963	California
184 ft (56.1 m)	Soo Line High Bridge	St. Croix River	1911	Minnesota / Wisconsin
182 ft (55.5 m)	Ship Canal Bridge	Lake Washington Ship Canal	1961	Washington
181 ft (55.2 m)	Sunshine Skyway Bridge	Tampa Bay	1987	Florida
180 ft (54.9 m)	Deception Pass Bridge	Puget Sound	1935	Washington
180 ft (54.9 m)	Central Susquehanna Valley Thruway Bridge	West Branch Susquehanna River	2022	Pennsylvania
178 ft (54.3 m)	Fred Hartman Bridge	Houston Ship Channel	1995	Texas
177 ft (53.9 m)	Rainbow Bridge	Neches River	1936	Texas
175 ft (53.3 m)	Dames Point Bridge	St. Johns River	1989	Florida
175 ft (53.3 m)	Fremont Bridge	Willamette River	1973	Oregon
175 ft (53.3 m)	Horace Wilkinson Bridge	Mississippi River	1968	Louisiana
175 ft (53.3 m)	Sam Houston Ship Channel Bridge	Houston Ship Channel	1982	Texas
175 ft (53.3 m)	Wilson Creek Bridge	Wilson Creek	2001	Virginia
174 ft (53.0 m)	Delaware Memorial Bridge (dual spans)	Delaware River	1951 / 1968	Delaware / New Jersey
172 ft (52.4 m)	Clio Trestle	Willow Creek	1909	California
170 ft (51.8 m)	Beaver River Bridge	Beaver River	1952	Pennsylvania
170 ft (51.8 m)	Crescent City Connection (dual spans)	Mississippi River	1958 / 1988	Louisiana
170 ft (51.8 m)	E. H. Swindell Bridge	East Street Valley	1930	Pennsylvania
170 ft (51.8 m)	Sunshine Bridge	Mississippi River	1964	Louisiana
170 ft (51.8 m)	Wissahickon Memorial Bridge	Wissahickon Creek	1932	Pennsylvania
167 ft (50.9 m)	Aurora Bridge	Lake Union	1932	Washington
166 ft (50.6 m)	Massachusetts Turnpike's Westfield River Bridge	Westfield River	1957	Massachusetts
165 ft (50.3 m)	Veterans Memorial Bridge	Mississippi River	1995	Louisiana
163 ft (49.7 m)	Quechee Gorge Bridge	Ottauquechee River	1911	Vermont
162 ft (49.4 m)	Hi-Line Railroad Bridge	Sheyenne River	1908	North Dakota
160 ft (48.8 m)	High Bridge	Mississippi River	1987	Minnesota
158 ft (48.2 m)	Hale Boggs Memorial Bridge	Mississippi River	1983	Louisiana
157 ft (47.9 m)	Tulip Trestle	Richland Creek	1906	Indiana
155 ft (47.2 m)	Bear Mountain Bridge	Hudson River	1924	New York
155 ft (47.2 m)	Blue Water Bridge (dual spans)	St. Clair River	1938 / 1997	Michigan / Ontario (Canada)
155 ft (47.2 m)	Gerald Desmond Bridge	Back Channel, Port of Long Beach	1968	California
155 ft (47.2 m)	Green River Gorge Bridge	Green River	1915	Washington
153 ft (46.6 m)	Huey P. Long Bridge (Jefferson Parish)	Mississippi River	1935	Louisiana
153 ft (46.6 m)	Walt Whitman Bridge	Delaware River	1957	Pennsylvania / New Jersey
152 ft (46.3 m)	Ambassador Bridge	Detroit River	1929	Michigan / Ontario (Canada)
152 ft (46.3 m)	Kingston–Rhinecliff Bridge	Hudson River	1957	New York
152 ft (46.3 m)	Mathews Bridge	St. Johns River	1953	Florida
150 ft (45.7 m)	Conde McCullough Memorial Bridge	Coos Bay	1936	Oregon
150 ft (45.7 m)	John E. Fitzgerald Bridge (Clarks Summit Bridge)	U.S. Routes 6 and 11	1955	Pennsylvania
150 ft (45.7 m)	Paul Bryant Bridge	Black Warrior River	2004	Alabama
150 ft (45.7 m)	Rosendale Trestle	Rondout Creek	1872	New York
150 ft (45.7 m)	Thousand Islands Bridge	Saint Lawrence River	1937	New York / Ontario (Canada)
150 ft (45.7 m)	Varina-Enon Bridge	James River	1990	Virginia
148 ft (45.1 m)	Carquinez Bridge (dual spans)	Carquinez Strait	1958 / 2003	California
147 ft (44.8 m)	Cut River Bridge	Cut River	1947	Michigan
147 ft (44.8 m)	Walnut Lane Bridge	Wissahickon Creek	1908	Pennsylvania
145 ft (44.2 m)	Jordan Bridge	Southern Branch Elizabeth River	2012	Virginia
145 ft (44.2 m)	Natchez Trace Parkway Bridge	State Route 96	1994	Tennessee
145 ft (44.2 m)	Rip Van Winkle Bridge	Hudson River	1935	New York
145 ft (44.2 m)	Vietnam Veterans Memorial Bridge	James River	2002	Virginia
144 ft (43.9 m)	Glenn L. Jackson Memorial Bridge	Columbia River	1982	Oregon / Washington
143 ft (43.6 m)	Henry Hudson Bridge	Spuyten Duyvil Creek	1936	New York
143 ft (43.6 m)	Outerbridge Crossing	Arthur Kill	1928	New York / New Jersey
143 ft (43.6 m)	Triborough Bridge (Robert F. Kennedy Bridge)	East River	1936	New York
142 ft (43.3 m)	Throgs Neck Bridge	East River	1961	New York
141 ft (43.0 m)	Hart Bridge	St. Johns River	1967	Florida
140 ft (42.7 m)	Bridge of the Gods	Columbia River	1926	Oregon / Washington
140 ft (42.7 m)	Cochrane–Africatown USA Bridge	Mobile River	1991	Alabama
140 ft (42.7 m)	Confusion Hill Bridges (north span)	South Fork Eel River	2008	California
140 ft (42.7 m)	Goethals Bridge	Arthur Kill	1928	New York / New Jersey
140 ft (42.7 m)	Governor Thomas Johnson Bridge	Patuxent River	1977	Maryland
140 ft (42.7 m)	High Bridge (Aqueduct Bridge)	Harlem River	1848 / 1927	New York
140 ft (42.7 m)	Israel LaFleur Bridge	Calcasieu River	1962	Louisiana
140 ft (42.7 m)	West Seattle Bridge	Duwamish Waterway	1984	Washington
139 ft (42.4 m)	New Tappan Zee Bridge (Governor Mario M. Cuomo Bridge)	Hudson River	2017	New York
138 ft (42.1 m)	Albertus L. Meyers Bridge	Little Lehigh Creek	1913	Pennsylvania
138 ft (42.1 m)	Benicia–Martinez Bridge (dual roadway spans)	Carquinez Strait	1962 / 2007	California
138 ft (42.1 m)	Corpus Christi Harbor Bridge	Port of Corpus Christi	1959	Texas
138 ft (42.1 m)	Tappan Zee Bridge	Hudson River	1955	New York
137 ft (41.8 m)	Cascade Creek Trestle	Cascade Creek	1889	Colorado
137 ft (41.8 m)	U.S. Route 20 Iowa River Bridge	Iowa River	2003	Iowa
136 ft (41.5 m)	Monroe Street Bridge	Spokane River	1911	Washington
135 ft (41.1 m)	Antioch Bridge	San Joaquin River	1978	California
135 ft (41.1 m)	Benicia–Martinez Bridge (railway span)	Carquinez Strait	1928	California
135 ft (41.1 m)	Benjamin Franklin Bridge	Delaware River	1926	Pennsylvania / New Jersey
135 ft (41.1 m)	Betsy Ross Bridge	Delaware River	1976	Pennsylvania / New Jersey
135 ft (41.1 m)	Bourne Bridge, Sagamore Bridge	Cape Cod Canal	1935	Massachusetts
135 ft (41.1 m)	Bronx–Whitestone Bridge	East River	1939	New York
135 ft (41.1 m)	Brooklyn Bridge	East River	1883	New York
135 ft (41.1 m)	Calcasieu River Bridge	Calcasieu River	1952	Louisiana
135 ft (41.1 m)	Castleton Bridge	Hudson River	1959	New York
135 ft (41.1 m)	Charles M. Braga Jr. Memorial Bridge	Taunton River	1965	Massachusetts
135 ft (41.1 m)	Delaware River–Turnpike Toll Bridge	Delaware River	1956	Pennsylvania / New Jersey
135 ft (41.1 m)	Girard Point Bridge	Schuylkill River	1985	Pennsylvania
135 ft (41.1 m)	Gold Star Memorial Bridge (dual spans)	Thames River	1943 / 1973	Connecticut
135 ft (41.1 m)	Governor Harry W. Nice Memorial Bridge	Potomac River	1940	Maryland / Virginia
135 ft (41.1 m)	Hell Gate Bridge	East River	1916	New York
135 ft (41.1 m)	Jamestown Verrazzano Bridge	Narragansett Bay	1992	Rhode Island
135 ft (41.1 m)	Manhattan Bridge	East River	1909	New York
135 ft (41.1 m)	Mid-Hudson Bridge	Hudson River	1930	New York
135 ft (41.1 m)	Mount Hope Bridge	Mount Hope Bay	1929	Rhode Island
135 ft (41.1 m)	Newburgh–Beacon Bridge (dual spans)	Hudson River	1963 / 1980	New York
135 ft (41.1 m)	Penobscot Narrows Bridge and Observatory	Penobscot River	2006	Maine
135 ft (41.1 m)	Piscataqua River Bridge	Piscataqua River	1972	Maine / New Hampshire
135 ft (41.1 m)	San Mateo–Hayward Bridge	San Francisco Bay	1967	California
135 ft (41.1 m)	Sidney Sherman Bridge	Houston Ship Channel	1973	Texas
135 ft (41.1 m)	Tobin Bridge	Mystic River	1950	Massachusetts
135 ft (41.1 m)	Williamsburg Bridge	East River	1903	New York
134 ft (40.8 m)	All-America Bridge	Little Cuyahoga River	1982	Ohio
134 ft (40.8 m)	Washington Bridge	Harlem River	1888	New York
132 ft (40.2 m)	Henderson County Bridge	Green River	1927	North Carolina
130 ft (39.6 m)	Queensboro Bridge (59th Street Bridge)	East River	1909	New York

== Gallery ==
The ten highest bridges in the United States:

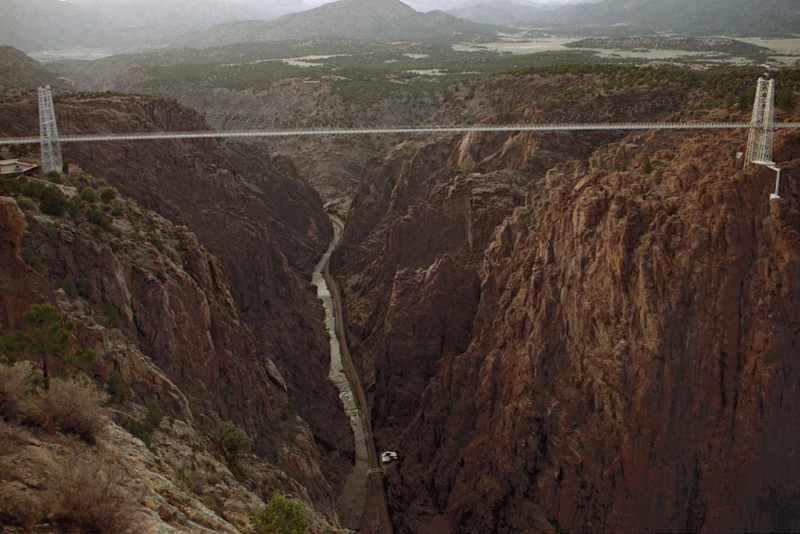
Royal Gorge Bridge—955'

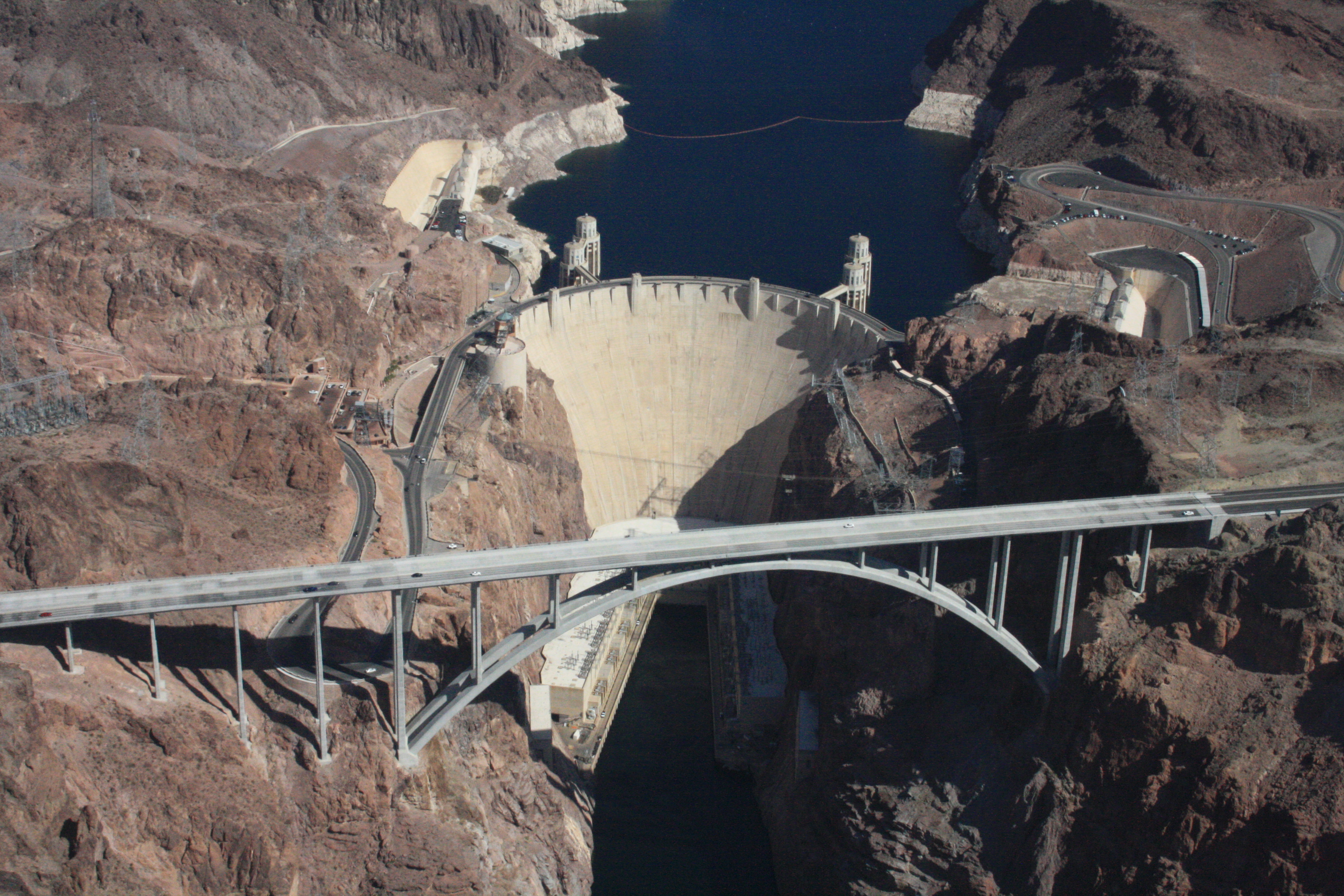
Mike O'Callaghan–Pat Tillman Memorial Bridge—900'

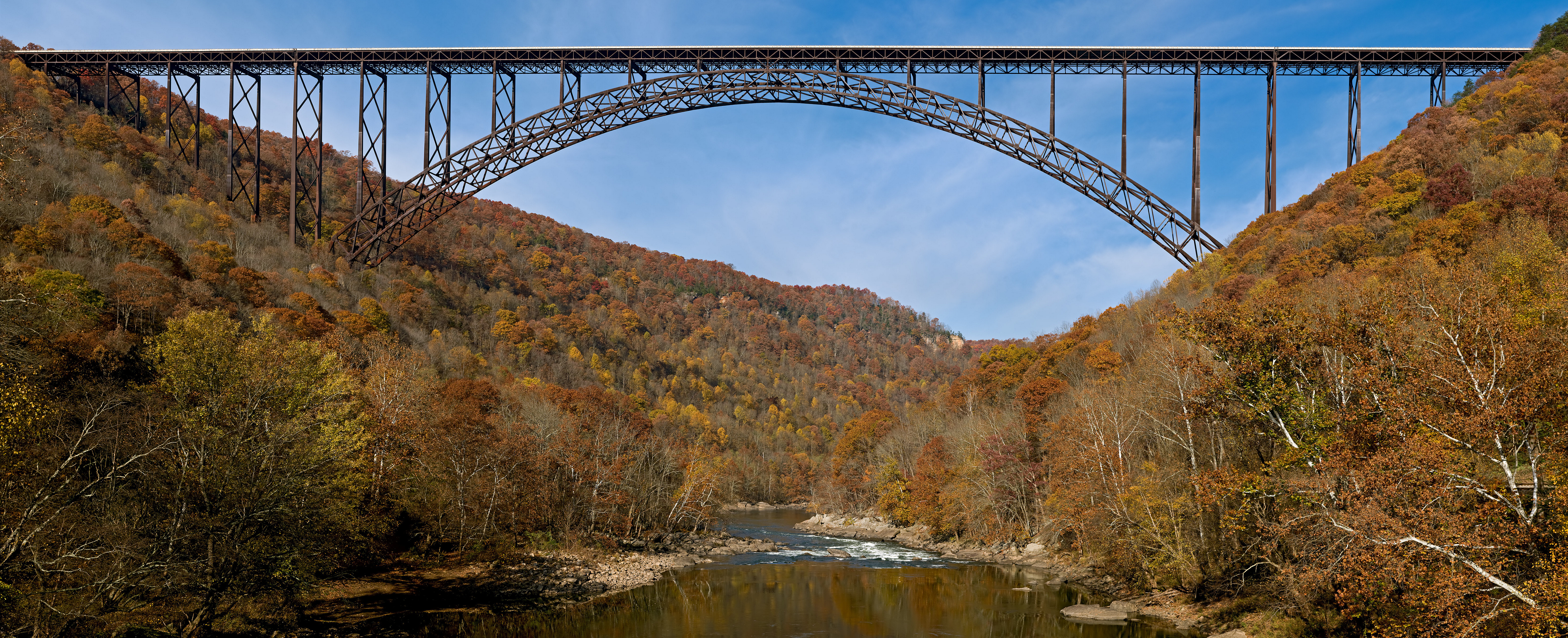
New River Gorge Bridge—876'

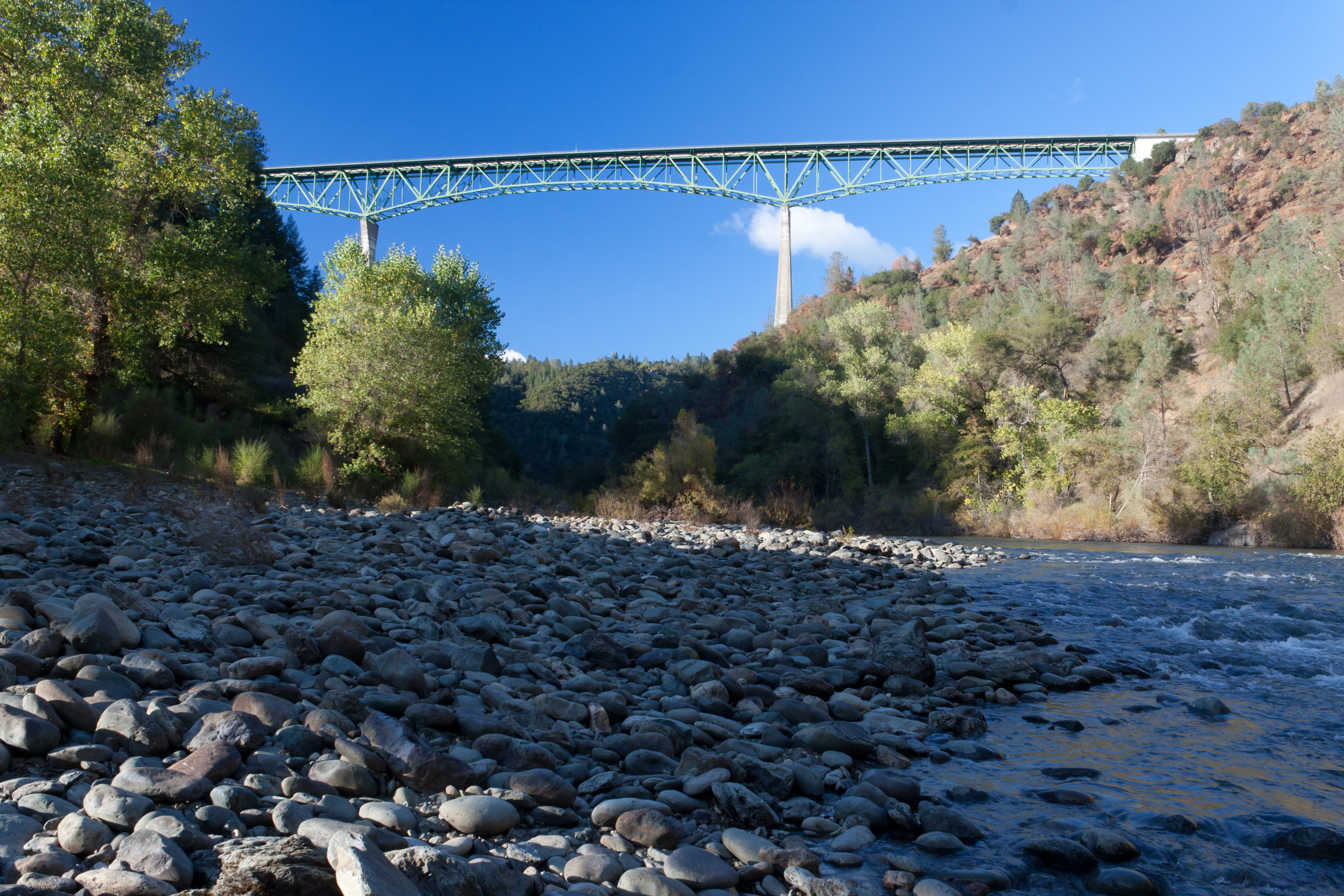
Foresthill Bridge—730'

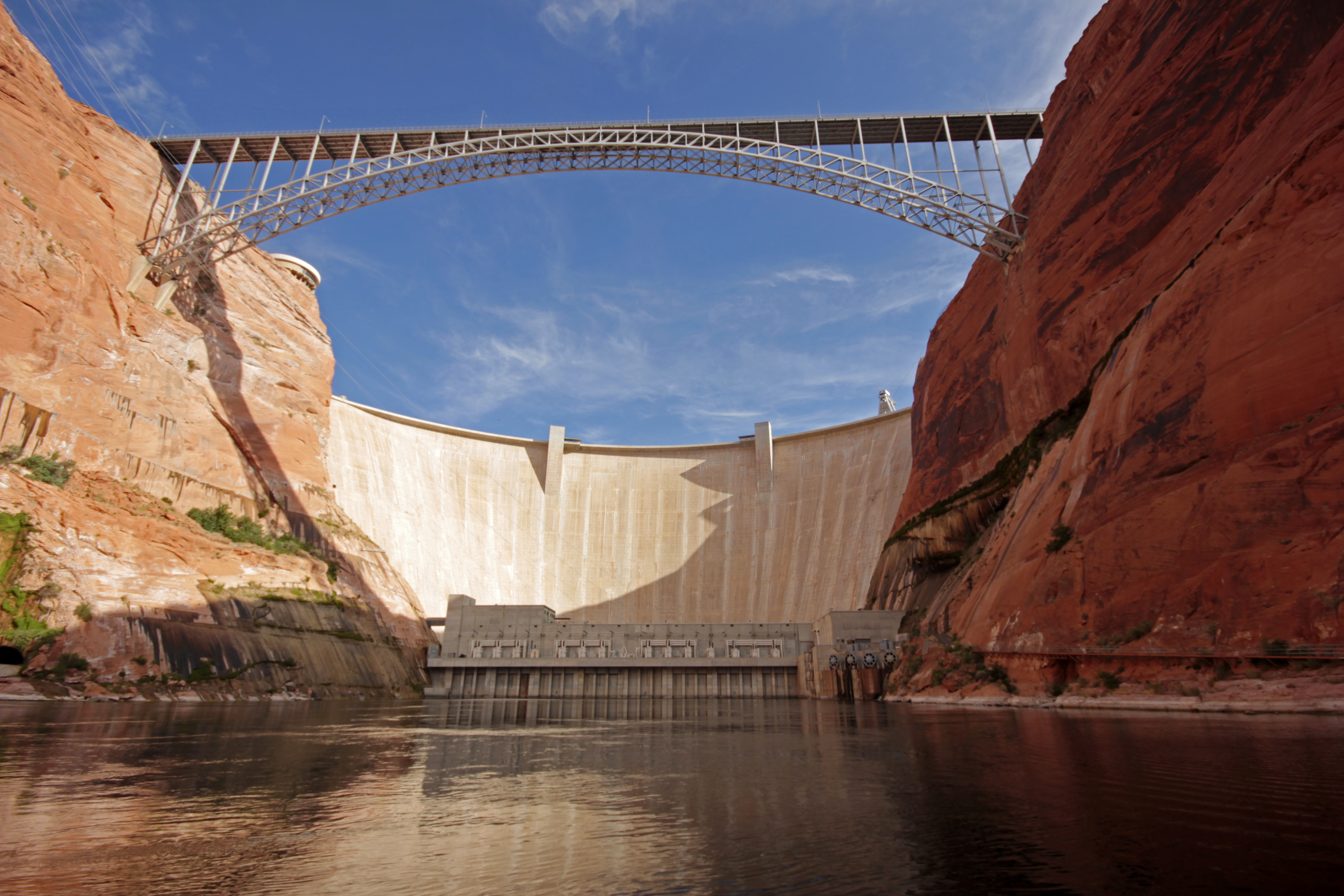
Glen Canyon Dam Bridge—700'

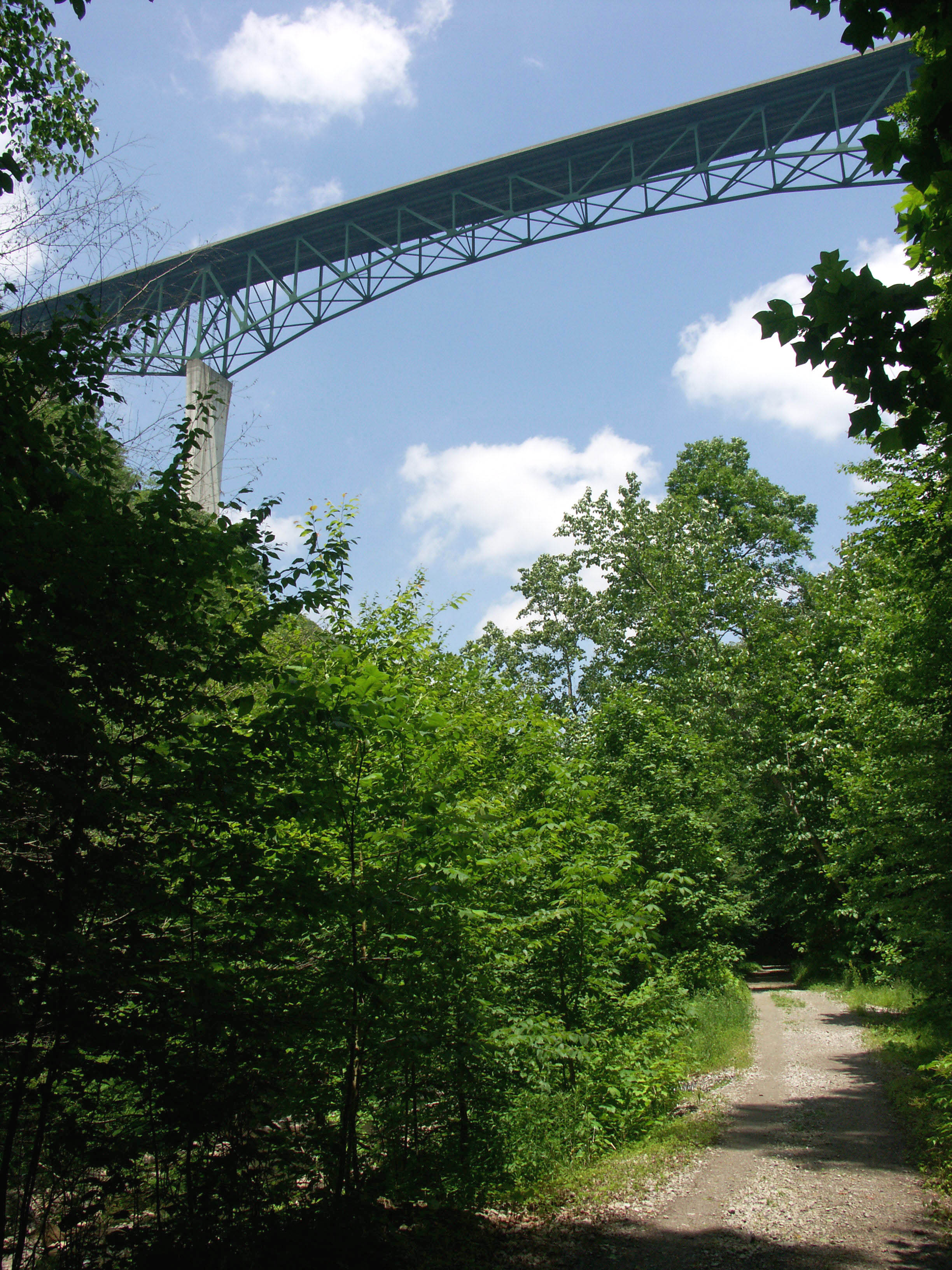
Phil G. McDonald Bridge—700'

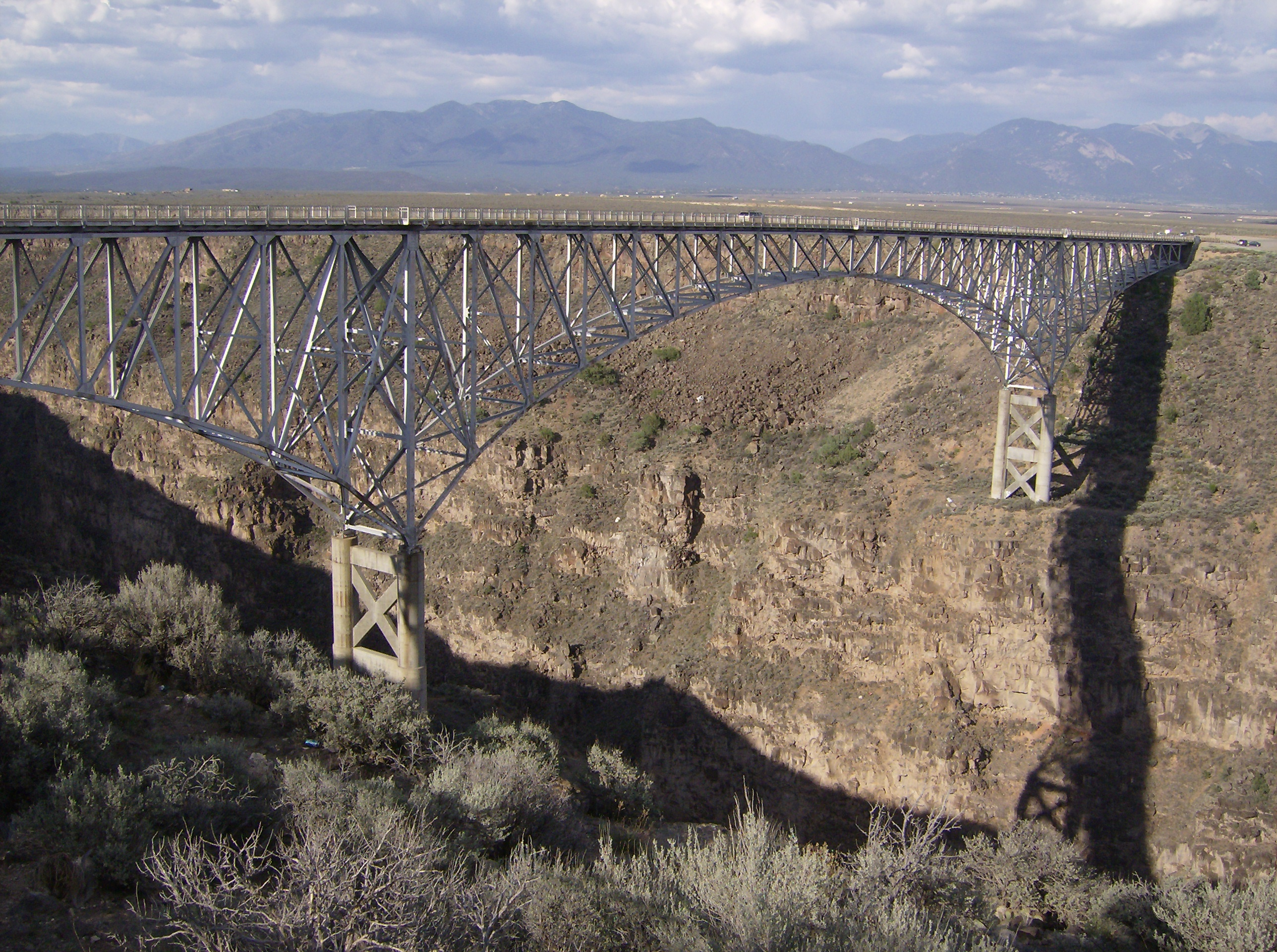
Rio Grande Gorge Bridge—565'

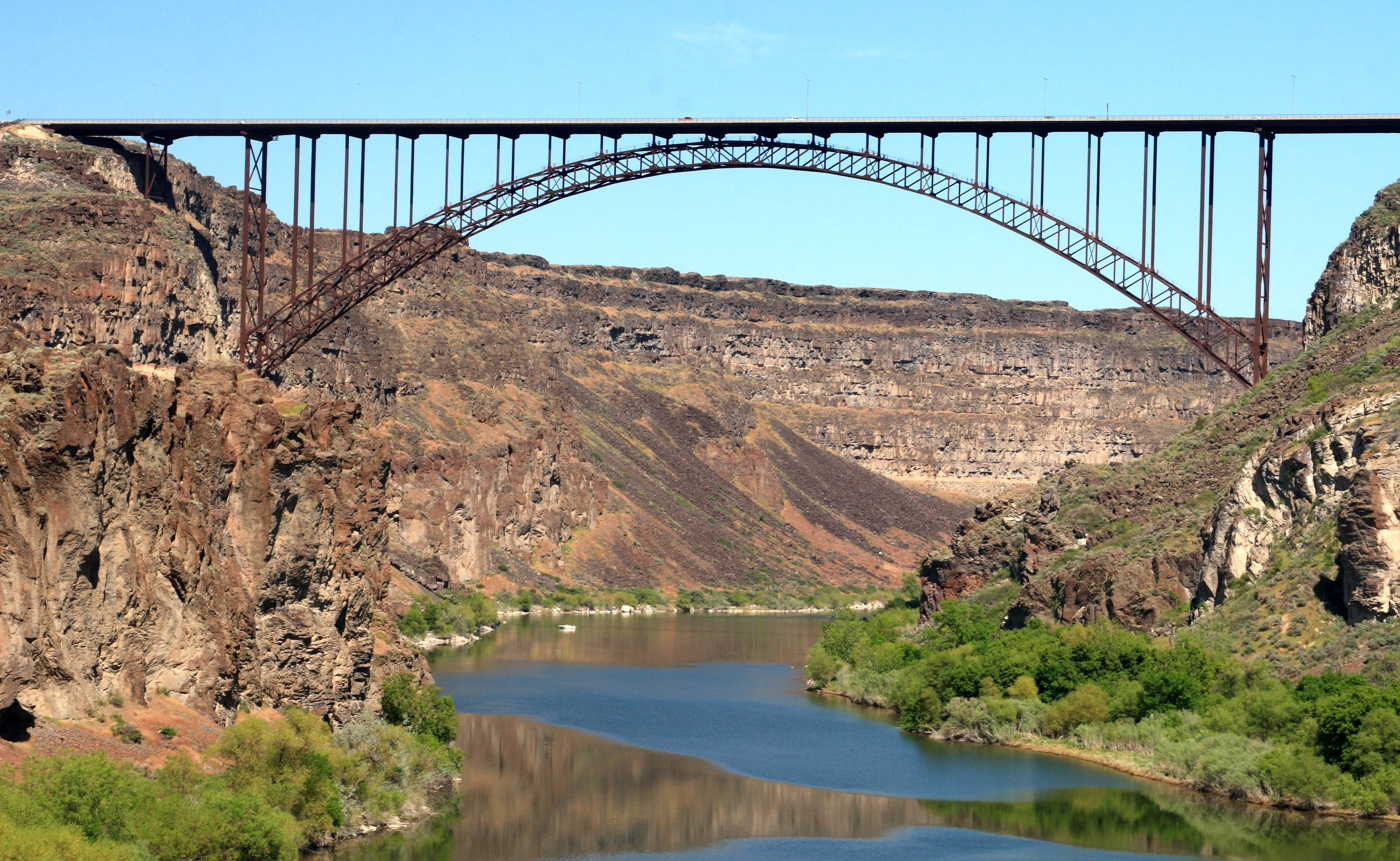
Perrine Bridge—486'

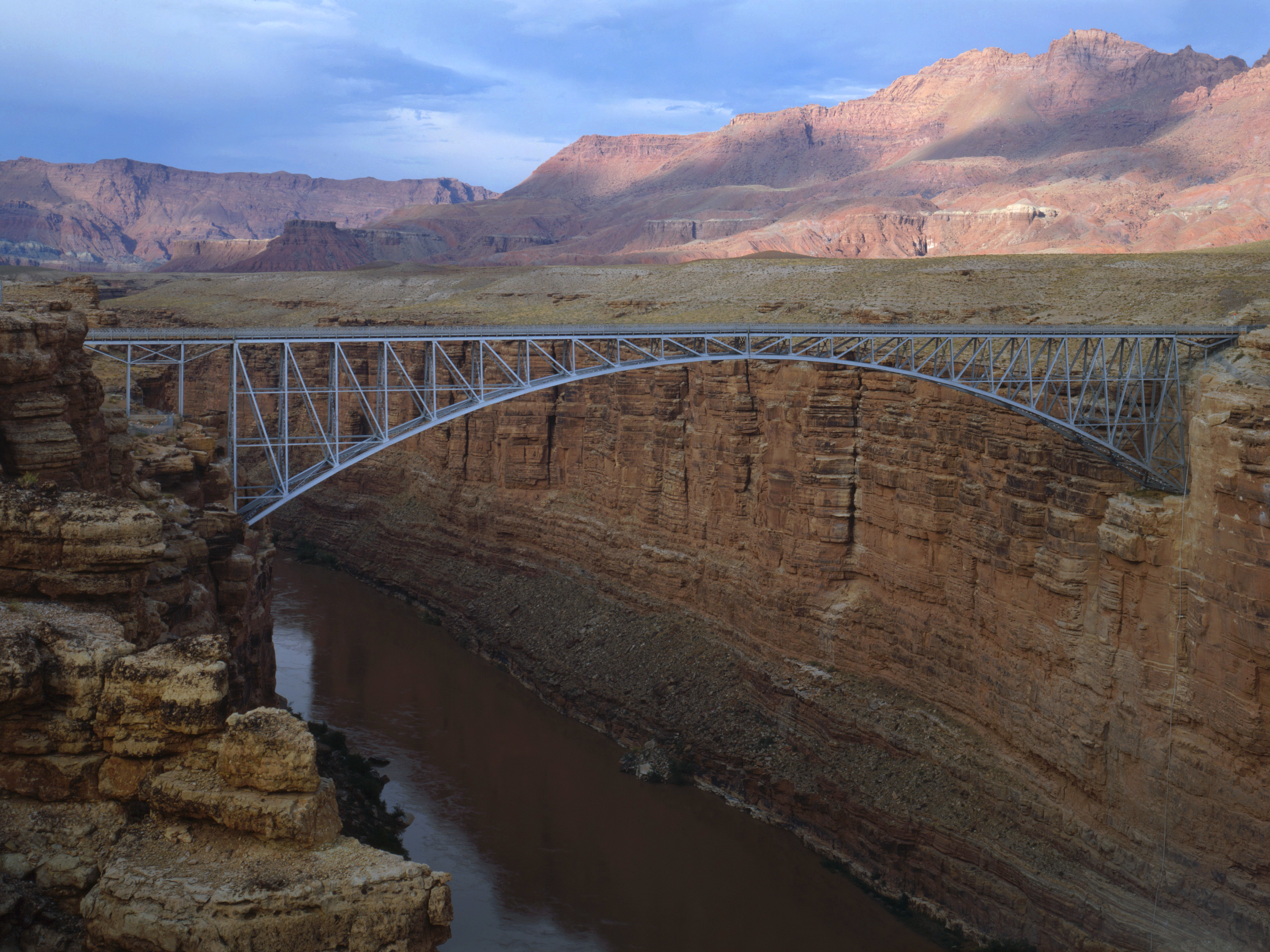
Navajo Bridge—470'

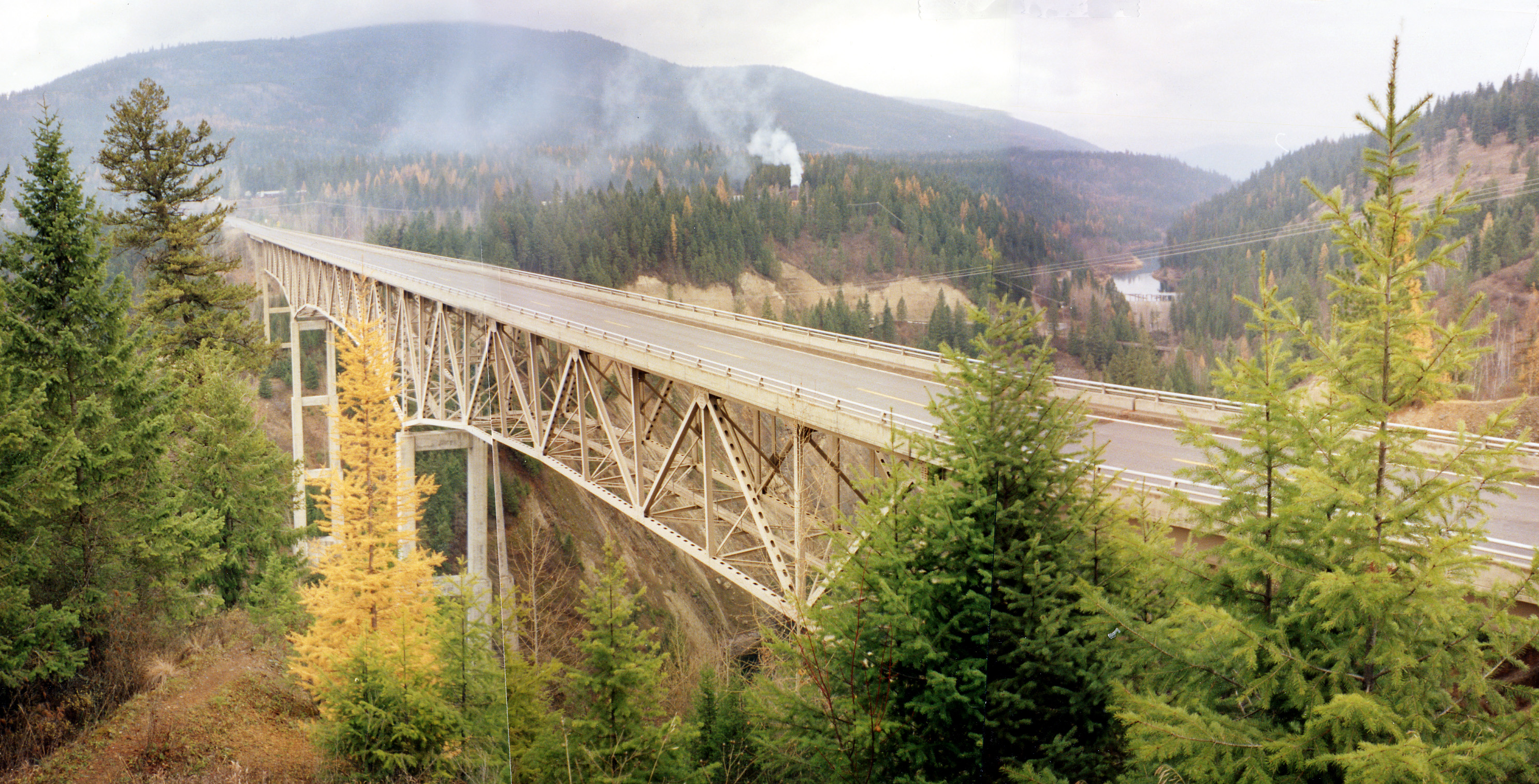
Moyie River Canyon Bridge—464'

== See also ==
- List of highest bridges
- List of longest bridges
- List of tallest bridges
