= Phill G. McDonald =

- Army Medal of Honor
- Born: September 13, 1941; Avondale, West Virginia, U.S.
- Died: June 7, 1968 (aged 26) near Kon Tum, Republic of Vietnam
- Burial place: Guilford Memorial Park, Greensboro, North Carolina
- Military career
- Allegiance: United States of America
- Branch: United States Army
- Service years: 1967–1968
- Rank: Private First Class
- Units: Company A, 1st Battalion, 14th Infantry Regiment, 4th Infantry Division
- Conflicts: Vietnam War †
- Awards: Medal of Honor; Purple Heart

Phill Gene McDonald (September 13, 1941 – June 7, 1968) was a United States Army soldier and a recipient of the United States military's highest decoration—the Medal of Honor—for his actions in the Vietnam War.

== Biography ==
McDonald joined the Army from Beckley, West Virginia, in 1967, and served as a private first class in Company A, 1st Battalion, 14th Infantry Regiment, 4th Infantry Division. He was posthumously awarded the Medal of Honor for his actions during a June 7, 1968 firefight near Kontum in South Vietnam, during Operation MacArthur.

McDonald, aged 26 at his death, was buried in Guilford Memorial Park, Greensboro, North Carolina.

== Medal of Honor citation ==
Private First Class McDonald's official Medal of Honor citation reads:

For conspicuous gallantry and intrepidity in action at the risk of his life above and beyond the call of duty. Pfc. McDonald distinguished himself while serving as a team leader with the 1st platoon of Company A. While on a combat mission his platoon came under heavy barrage of automatic weapons fire from a well concealed company-size enemy force. Volunteering to escort two wounded comrades to an evacuation point, Pfc. McDonald crawled through intense fire to destroy with a grenade an enemy automatic weapon threatening the safety of the evacuation. Returning to his platoon, he again volunteered to provide covering fire for the maneuver of the platoon from its exposed position. Realizing the threat he posed, enemy gunners concentrated their fire on Pfc. McDonald's position, seriously wounding him. Despite his painful wounds, Pfc. McDonald recovered the weapon of a wounded machine gunner to provide accurate covering fire for the gunner's evacuation. When other soldiers were pinned down by a heavy volume of fire from a hostile machine gun to his front, Pfc. McDonald crawled toward the enemy position to destroy it with grenades. He was mortally wounded in this intrepid action. Pfc. McDonald's gallantry at the risk of his life which resulted in the saving of the lives of his comrades, is in keeping with the highest traditions of the military service and reflects great credit upon himself, his unit, and the U.S. Army.

== See also ==
- List of Medal of Honor recipients
- List of Medal of Honor recipients for the Vietnam War
- Phil G. McDonald Bridge – a West Virginia bridge officially renamed from the Glade Creek Bridge in his honor
