= Cathedral arch =

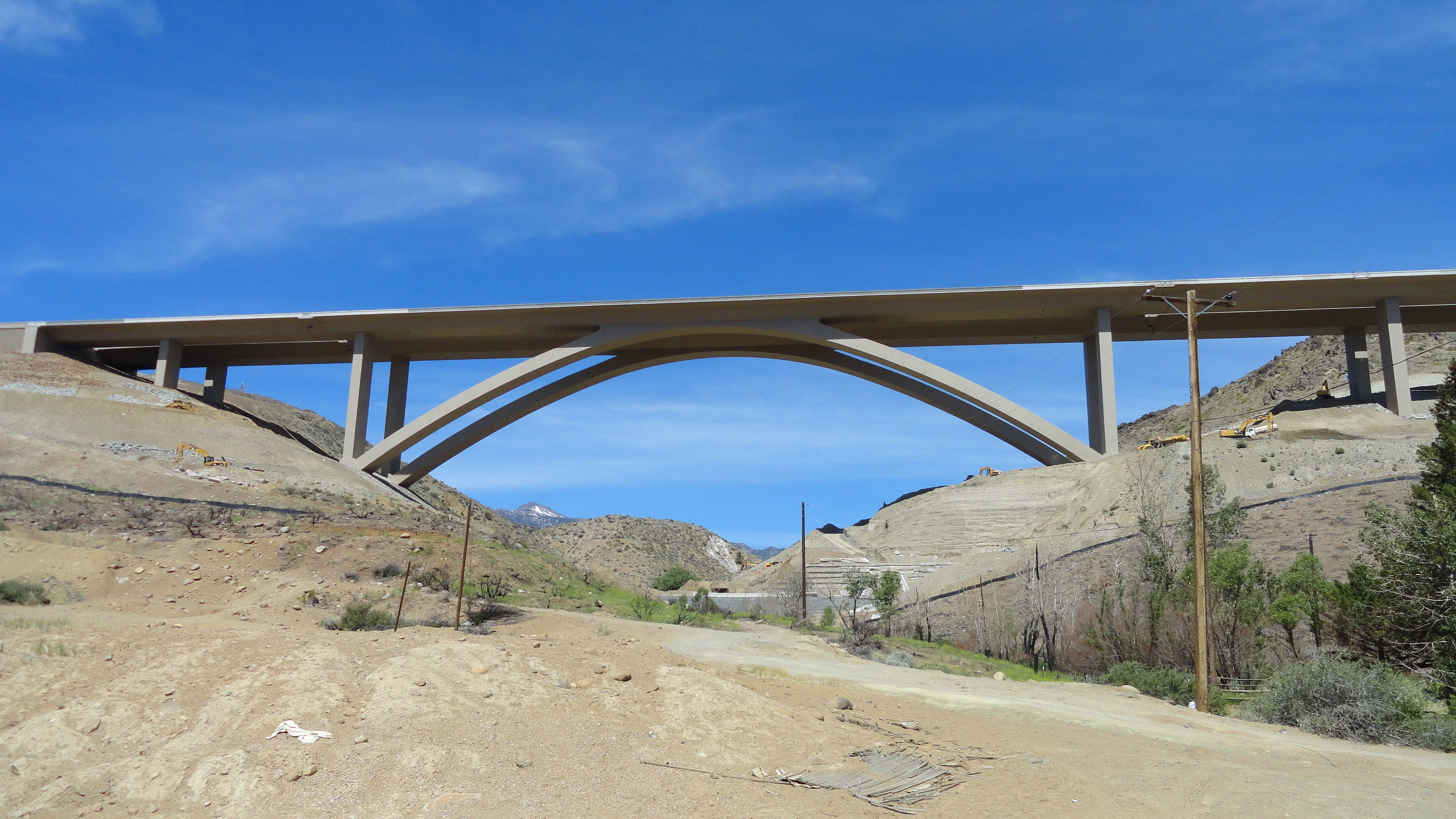
Galena Creek Bridge

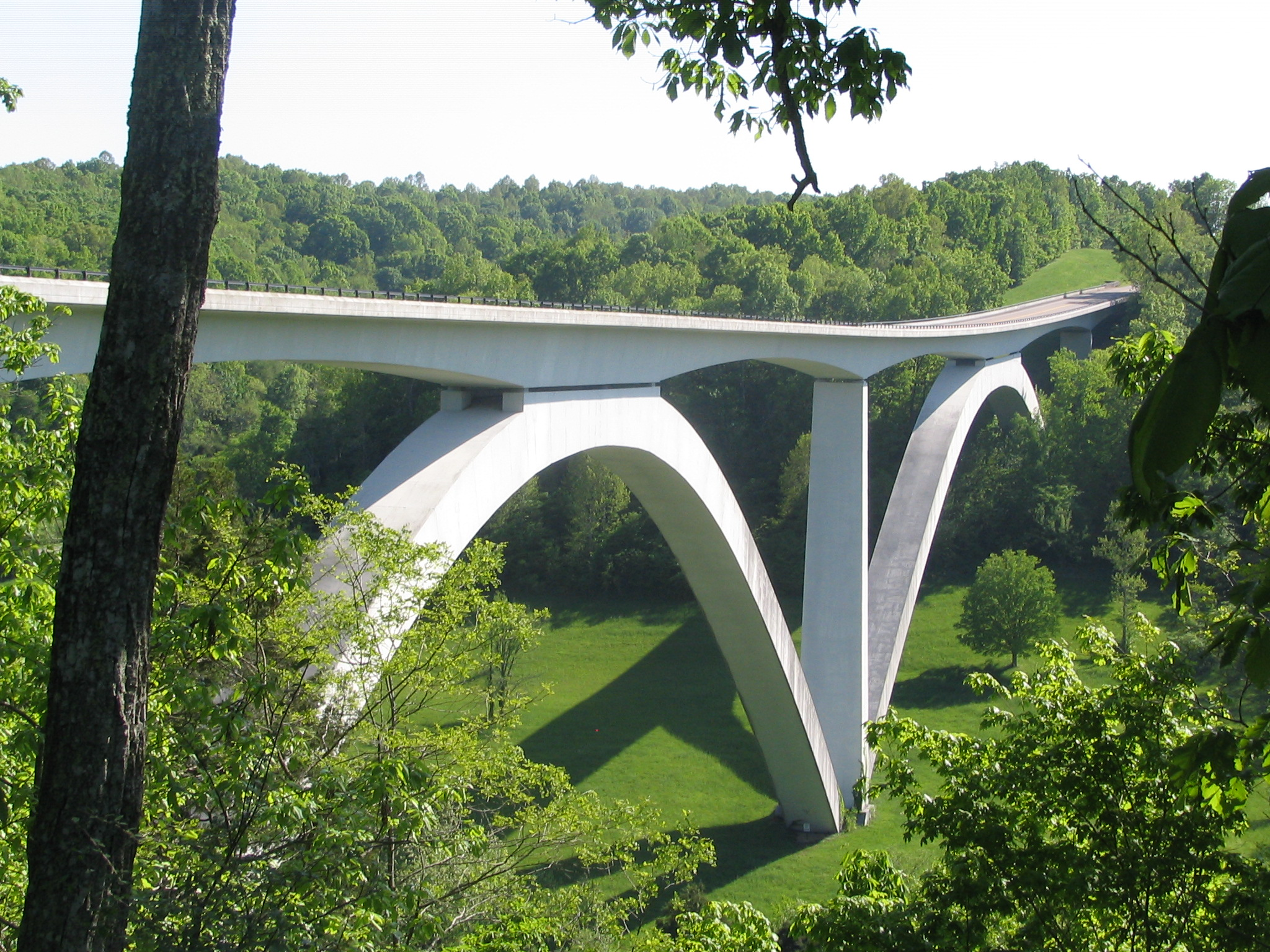
Natchez Trace Parkway Bridge

A cathedral arch is an arch used in bridge design. It consists of an arched structural system, wherein vertical load bearing occurs only at the crown, or peak of the arch. As applied to bridge design, cathedral arch bridges feature no intermediary spandrel column elements between the foundation abutments and the crown of the arch system, where the roadway superstructure is constrained to the substructure.

The largest cathedral arch bridge in the world is the Galena Creek Bridge near Reno, Nevada.

Outside the bridge design the term refers to arches similar to the stilted arches used in cathedrals.
