= Rio Grande Gorge Bridge =

Steel deck arch bridge near Taos, New Mexico, U.S.

- U.S. National Register of Historic Places
- NM State Register of Cultural Properties
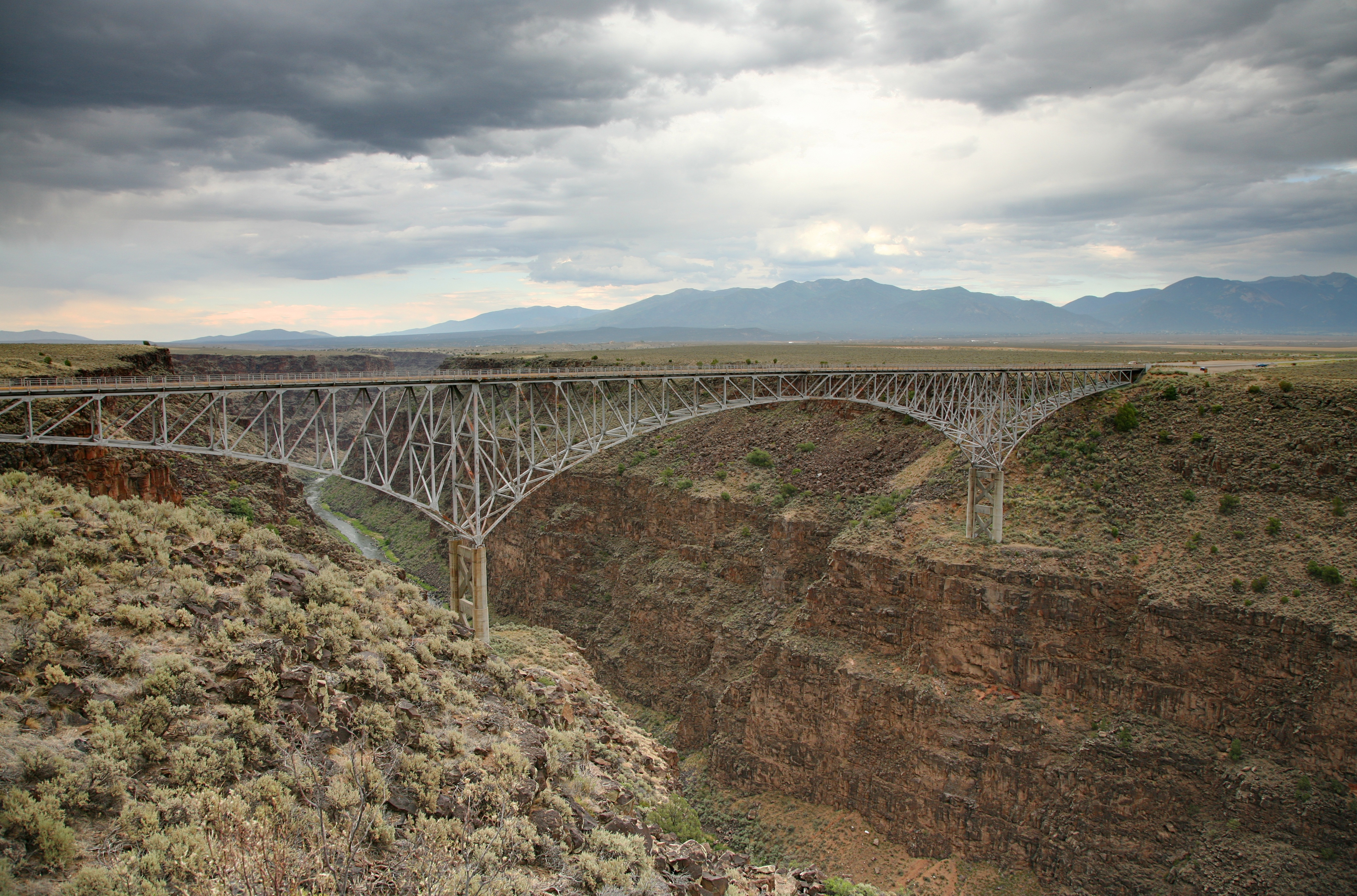
- Rio Grande Gorge Bridge

- Location within New Mexico
- Nearest city: Taos, New Mexico
- Coordinates: 36°28′34″N 105°43′56″W
- Area: 1 acre (0.40 ha)
- Built: 1965; 61 years ago
- Architects: Charles E. Reed, Chief Bridge Engineer; Herman Tachau, Principal Bridge Designer
- Architectural style: Steel deck truss
- MPS: Historic Highway Bridges of New Mexico MPS
- NRHP reference No.: 97000733
- NMSRCP No.: 1664

Significant dates
- Added to NRHP: July 15, 1997
- Designated NMSRCP: May 9, 1997

The Rio Grande Gorge Bridge, locally known as the "Gorge Bridge" or the "Taos High Bridge", is a steel deck arch bridge across the Rio Grande Gorge 10 miles (16 km) northwest of Taos, New Mexico, United States. Roughly 600 feet (180 m) above the Rio Grande, it is the seventh highest bridge in the United States.

== Construction ==
On July 12, 1963, New Mexico Governor Jack M. Campbell set off a dynamite blast at the bridge construction site during a groundbreaking ceremony attended by over 1,000 people. The construction companies involved included J. H. Ryan & Son, Inc. Ryan was awarded the contract to build the bridge on June 28, 1963 at a contract price of $1,942,463. Brown Construction Co, Albuquerque, built the east approach, and Wayne A. Lowdermilk, Inc., built the west approach. The bridge was designed by the New Mexico Highway Department Bridge Design Section, with bridge engineer Charles E. Reed leading the team.

The individual truss members and gusset plates were fabricated at U. S. Steel plants in Ambridge, Pennsylvania, and Gary, Indiana. They were shipped by rail to Antonito, Colorado, then were trucked to the jobsite. Using a derrick on each side of the gorge connected with overhead cables, two 105-foot-tall concrete piers were built on the slopes of the canyon, one on each side of the gorge, with footers for the piers roughly 400 feet above the river. Each pier stands 106 feet high, with another 100 feet of steel trusses on the piers to the roadway deck. The steel arches taper to twenty feet at the canyon rims and in the center of the bridge. The piers allowed for cantilever construction, building out away from the pier on both sides. Falsework, a support structure halfway between the pier and the east abutment, was used to support the east half arch.

The Rio Grande Gorge Bridge has truss spans of 300 feet (91 m), 600 feet (180 m) and 300 feet (91 m) feet and a 36-foot (11 m) steel I-beam approach span at each end. It has a total length of 1,272 feet (388 m) and a 28-foot (8.5 m) roadway. It was fabricated by U. S. Steel’s American Bridge Company. A high line spanning the gorge was used to position the steel box beam members during its construction. The total cost of the bridge was $2,153,000. The Rio Grande Gorge Bridge was designed by the New Mexico State Highway Department Bridge Design Section.

Hazardous situations occurred frequently when radios used in transmitting messages by the spotter on the high line to the control station cut out. The spotter had to resort to hand signals, not always visible.

An American flag rode the last piece of structural steel to be put in place during a Topping out ceremony on Friday, March 26, 1965. After the steel was bolted into position, the erecting ironworker superintendent, Elmer Cornett, presented the American flag to George Lavender, who had previously served as chairman of and commissioner on the New Mexico Highway Commission. During his time on the Commission, Lavender was one of the biggest promoters of the bridge. For years after its completion, locals called the bridge Lavender Bridge.

The bridge was dedicated September 10, 1965 with Governor Campbell and George Lavender in attendance. The bridge is a part of U.S. Route 64, a major east–west road.

== Awards ==
In 1966, the American Institute of Steel Construction declared the bridge "Most Beautiful Steel Bridge" in the "Long Span" category.

== Restoration ==
A $2.4 million "facelift" to the bridge was completed in September 2012. This year-long project included repair and restoration work to the 50-year-old bridge including structural steelwork, a new concrete deck surface, new sidewalks, ramps, curbs, and gutters.

== Suicide problem ==
The bridge has been the site of numerous suicides. Authorities are studying ways to deter suicides, including the construction of suicide barriers, such as higher fencing, netting, or more security, and also hotline buttons, but cite money as a major reason that no steps have been taken.

== Span height discrepancy ==
Although one of the highest bridges in the United States, exactly how high the main span is above ground is unclear. When it was placed on the National Register of Historic Places in 1967, this distance was cited as 650 ft (200 m) over the Rio Grande. Today, that number is still widely used.

However, in 2010, the Highest Bridges Web Site came out with a substantially lower (565 ft; 172 m) figure. This height was most likely derived using a laser range finder but the site did not specifically reference it that way. Wikipedia used this 565 ft (172 m) figure in 2012 when updating its List of bridges in the United States by height, but kept the 650 ft (200 m) figure for the bridge in its Rio Grande del Norte National Monument article. In 2015, a height of 600 ft (180 m) appeared on the scene. The author of a bridge book noted this discrepancy and recommended this compromise number be used until the matter was authoritatively resolved. This height figure then cropped up in a January 2016 Materials Performance magazine white paper about the bridge's then just completed inspection by the New Mexico Department of Transportation.

== In popular culture ==
The bridge has appeared in many films, including Natural Born Killers, Twins, White Sands, She's Having a Baby, The Signal, Paul, Vacation, Wild Hogs, and Terminator Salvation.

== Gallery ==
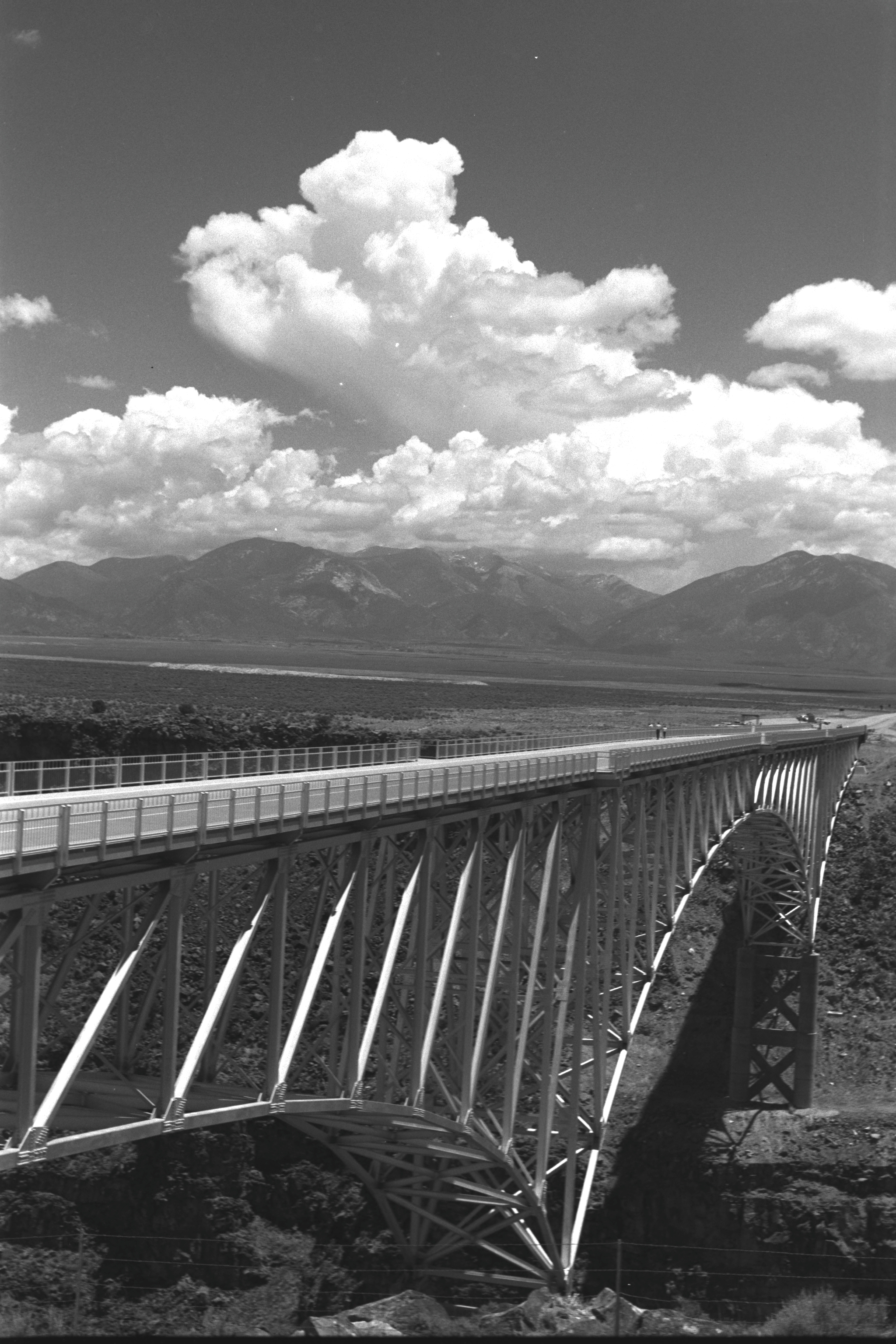
Rio Grande Gorge Bridge, 1970

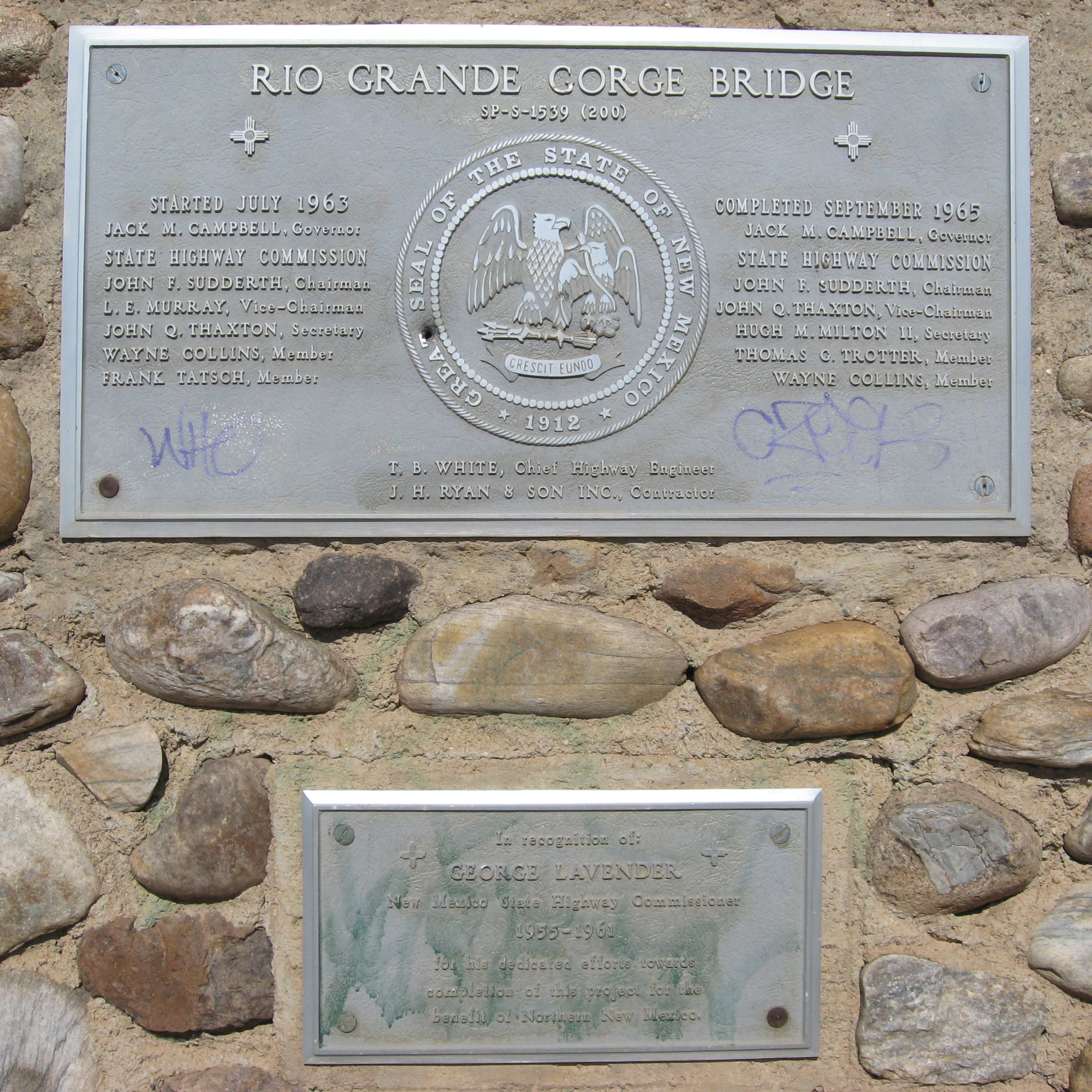
Dedication plaques at bridge, 2008

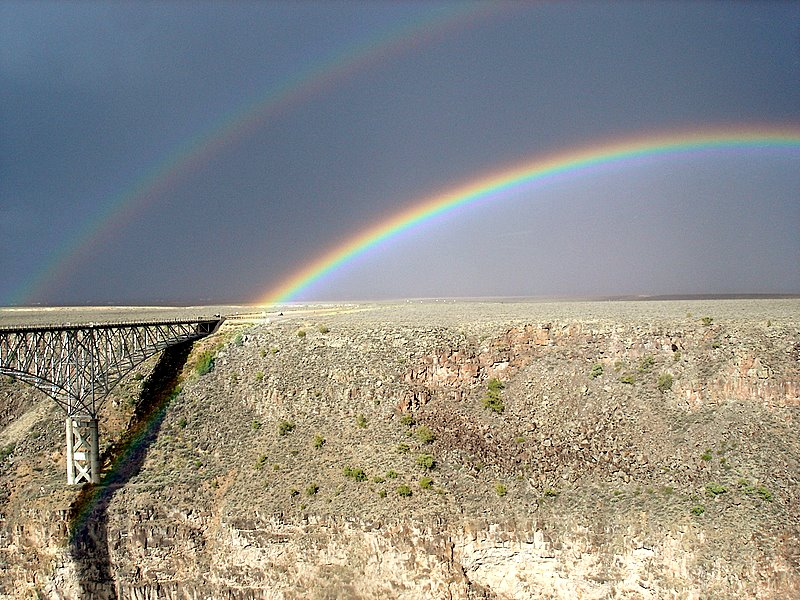
View of bridge and rainbow, 2006

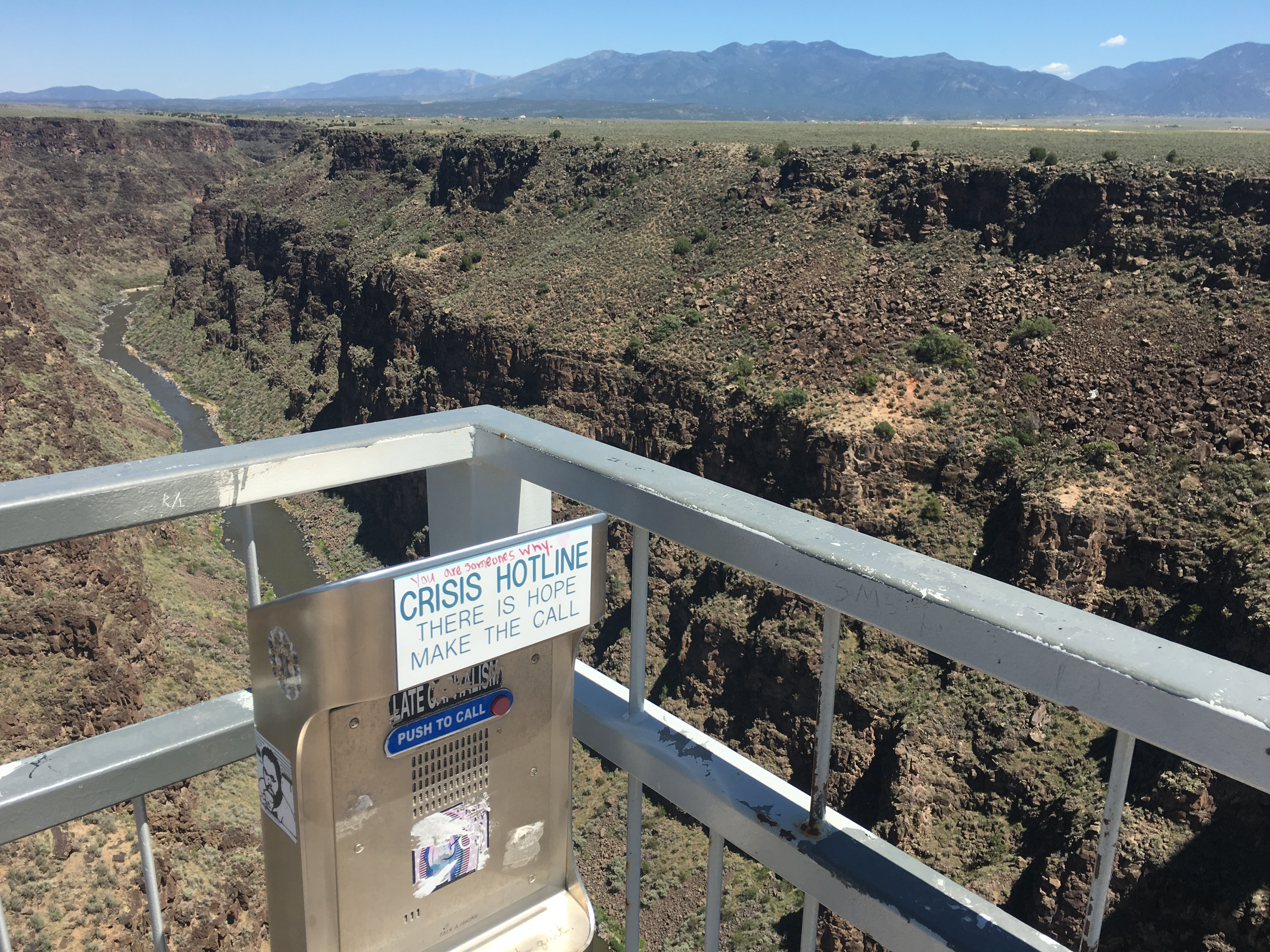
Crisis hotline communication pillar

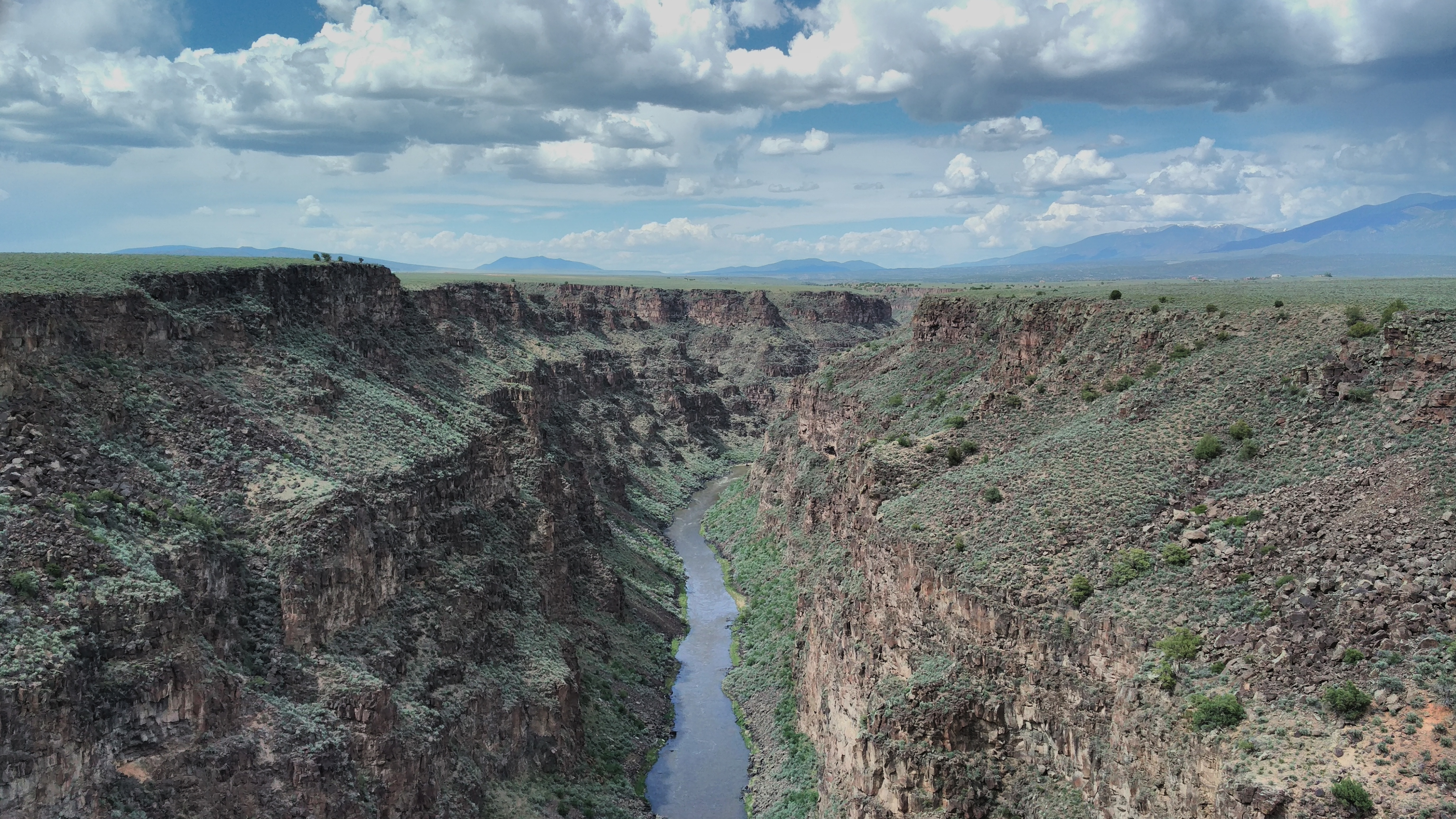
View from bridge, 2017

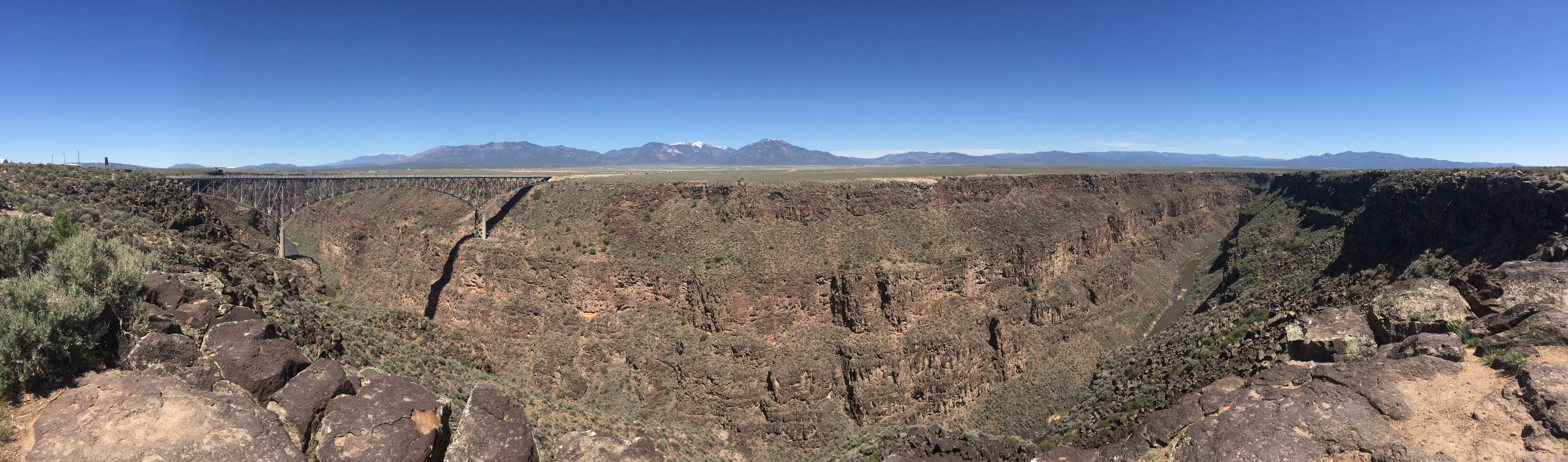
2021 panoramic view

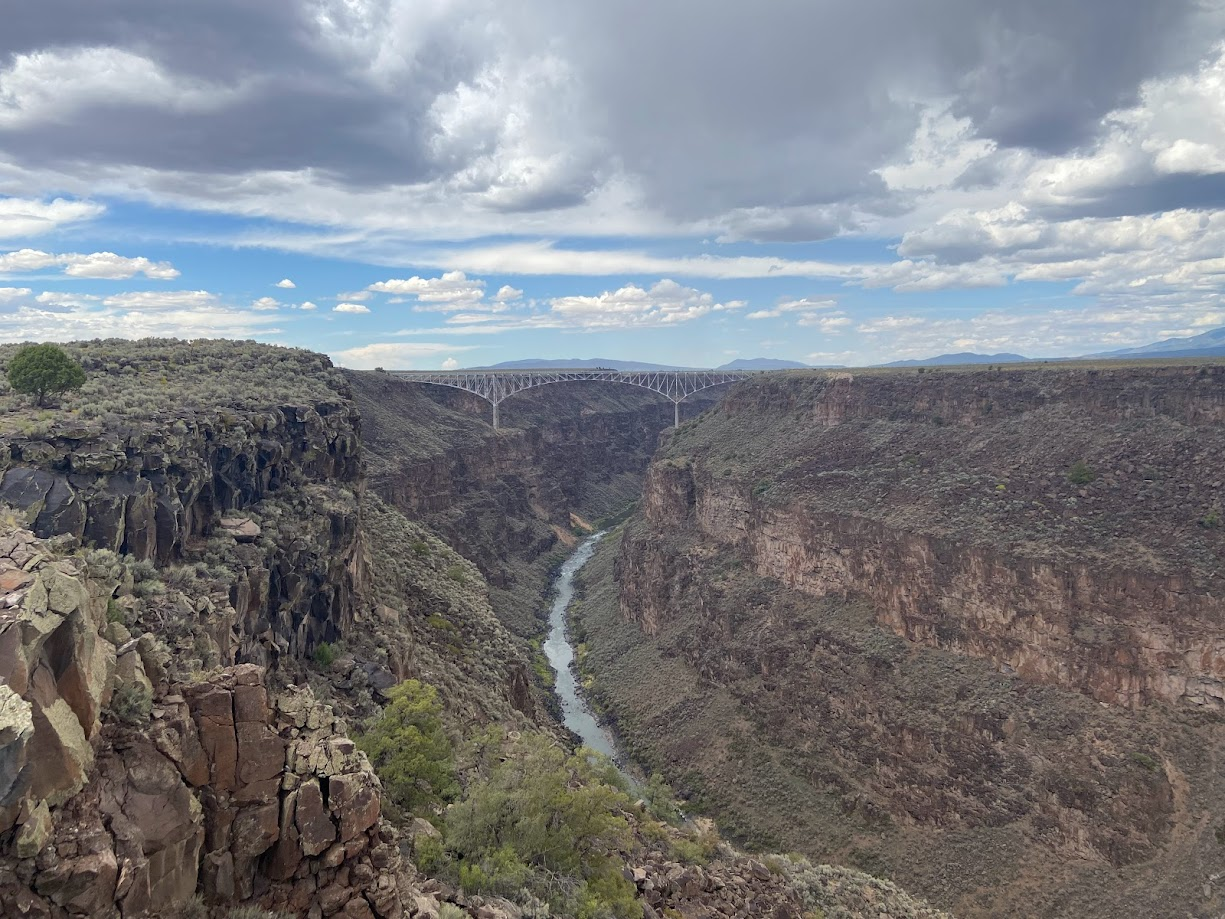
View of the Rio Grande Gorge near Taos, New Mexico

== See also ==
- National Register of Historic Places listings in Taos County, New Mexico
- List of bridges in the United States by height
