= Sunlight Creek =

Creek in Park County, Wyoming, U.S.

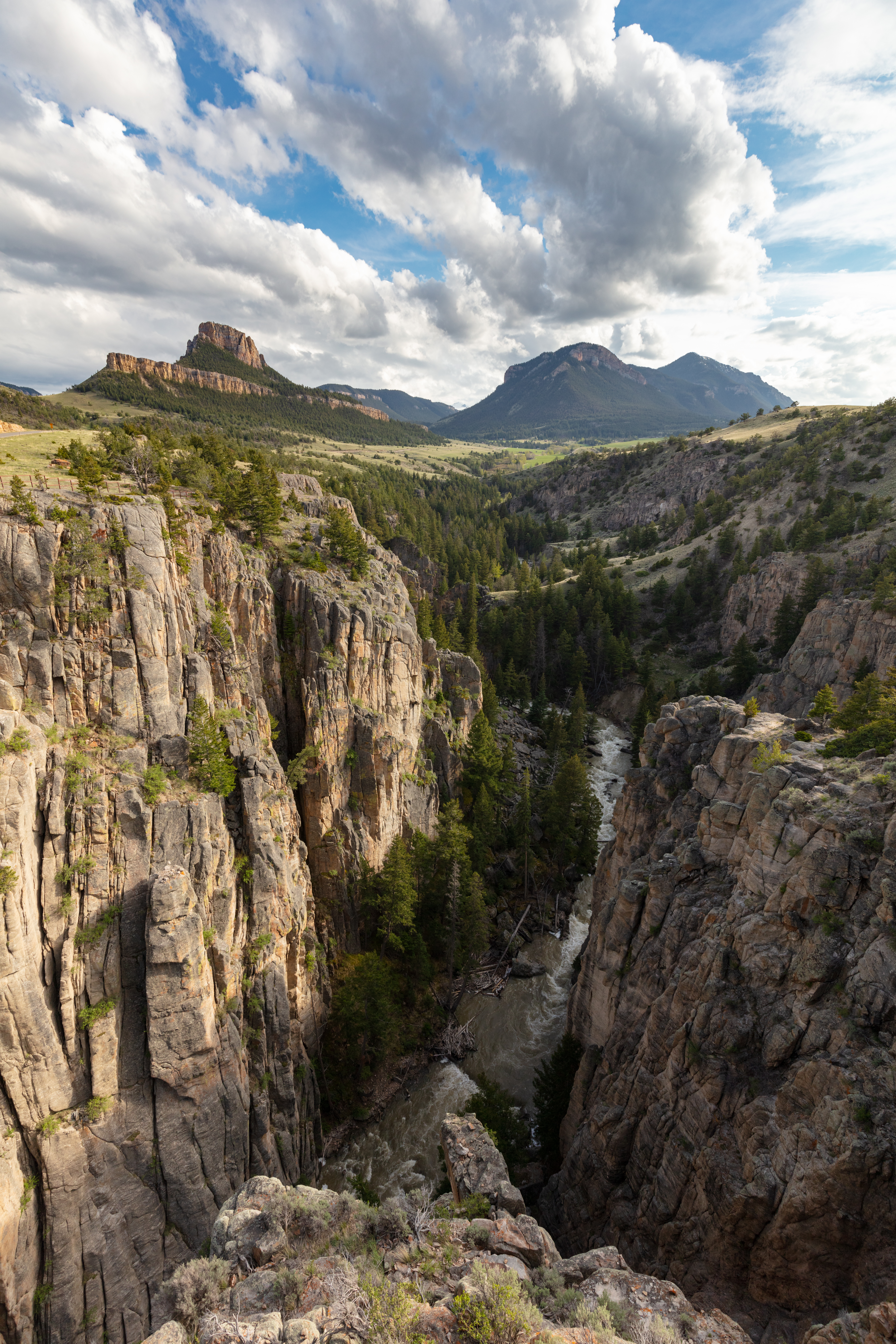
- Sunlight Creek viewed from Sunlight Creek Bridge

- Location of Sunlight Creek mouth Sunlight Creek (the United States)

Location
- Country: United States
- State: Wyoming
- County: Park County

Physical characteristics
- Source
  - location: Absaroka Range
  - coordinates: 44°41′41″N 109°49′13″W
- Mouth
  - location: Clarks Fork Yellowstone River
  - coordinates: 44°47′11″N 109°23′35″W
  - elevation: 4,806 ft (0.9102 mi)

Sunlight Creek is a tributary of Clarks Fork Yellowstone River part of the Yellowstone River watershed, located in Park County, Wyoming, United States in the Shoshone National Forest.

== Course ==
Sunlight Creek begins in the Absaroka Range of the Rocky Mountains and then flows east into the Sunlight Basin. The creek then flows through a granite canyon carved by the creek, Sunlight Gorge, where it is crossed by the Sunlight Creek Bridge, the highest bridge in the state of Wyoming. Sunlight Creek then flows northeast into the Clarks Fork Yellowstone River.

== History ==
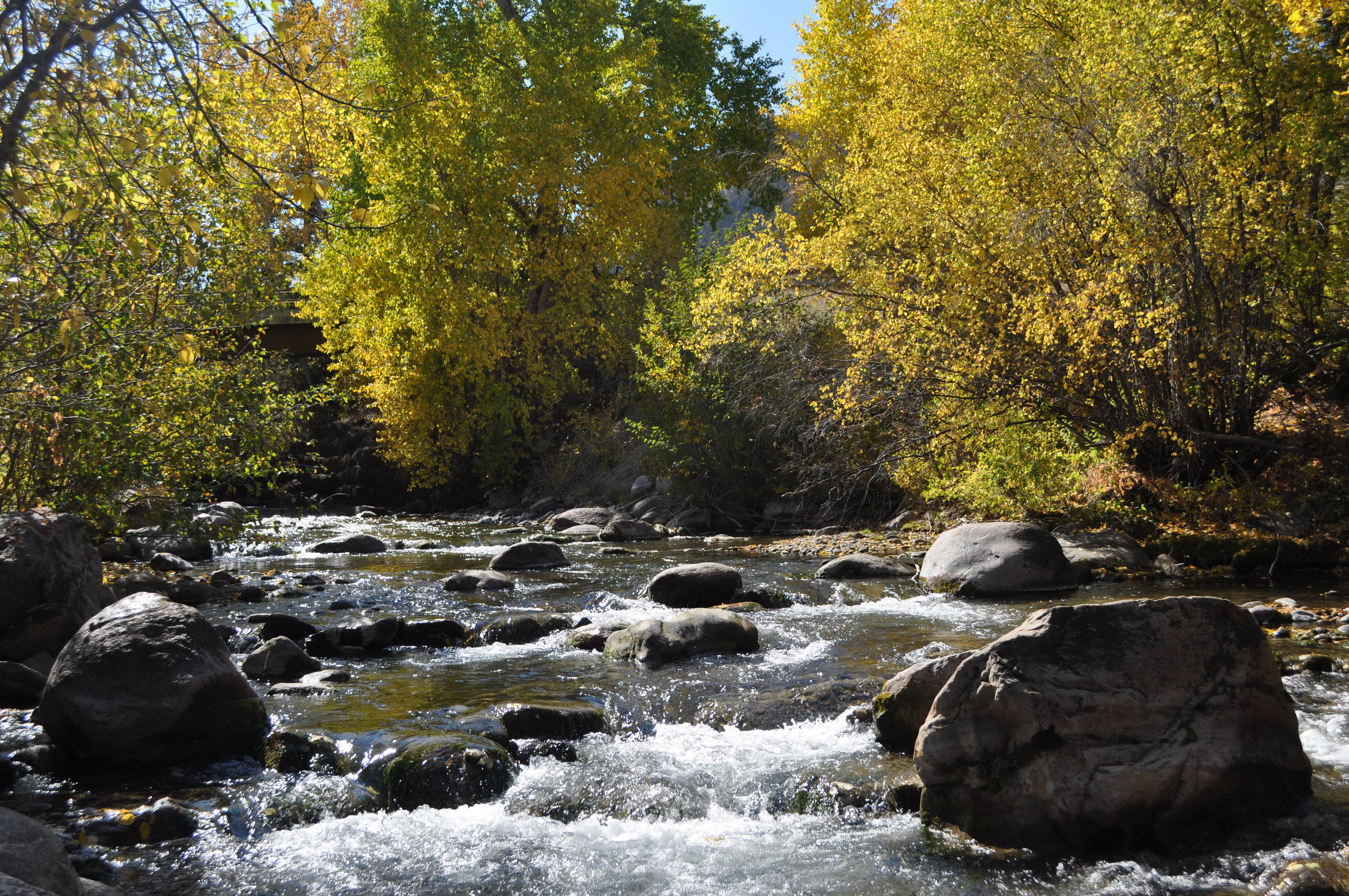
Sunlight Creek

In the early 1800s, prospectors and fur traders trapped in dense fog in the mountains named the Sunlight Basin after the sudden sunlight-covered valley. According to them, "the only thing that can get into this valley most of the year, is sunlight." Sunlight Creek, which flows east through the middle of the area from the mountains into the canyon, is named for the basin.

In 1877, Chief Joseph and his Nez Perce travelled through Sunlight Gorge whilst escaping US cavalries, as part of three months and 1,170 miles (1,880 km) outmaneuvering them through present-day Oregon, Washington, Idaho, Wyoming, and Montana during the Nez Perce War.

On November 20, 2018, work began on a project by the Wyoming Game and Fish Department to prevent erosion of Sunlight Creek, which threatened the area inhabited by moose and elk, the bridges that cross the creek, power lines in the area, and local fishing, by rechanneling the creek.

=== Sunlight Creek Bridge ===
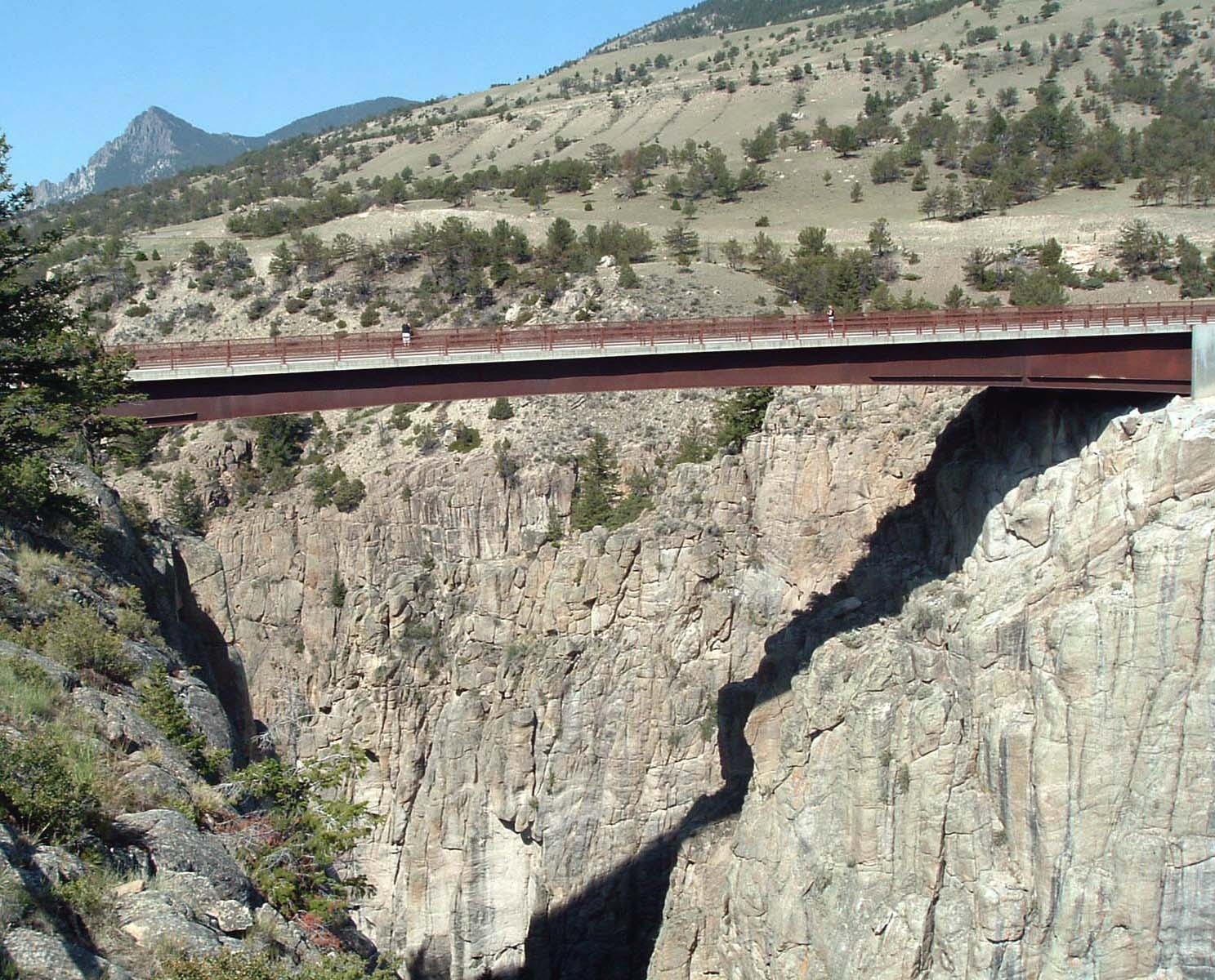
Sunlight Creek Bridge crossing the Sunlight Gorge

In 1985, the Sunlight Creek Bridge was built across the Sunlight Gorge, carrying Chief Joseph Scenic Byway (Wyoming Highway 296) and two pedestrian walkways. At 285.4 ft (87.0 m), it is the highest bridge in Wyoming.

== Recreation ==
Sunlight Creek is followed and crossed by a gravel road, Sunlight Road (Forest Road 101), for the majority of its course, which provides access to campgrounds along the river in the North Absaroka Wilderness area, as well as other off-roading trails and forest roads.
