= Jeremiah Morrow Bridge =

Bridge in Warren County, Ohio, United States

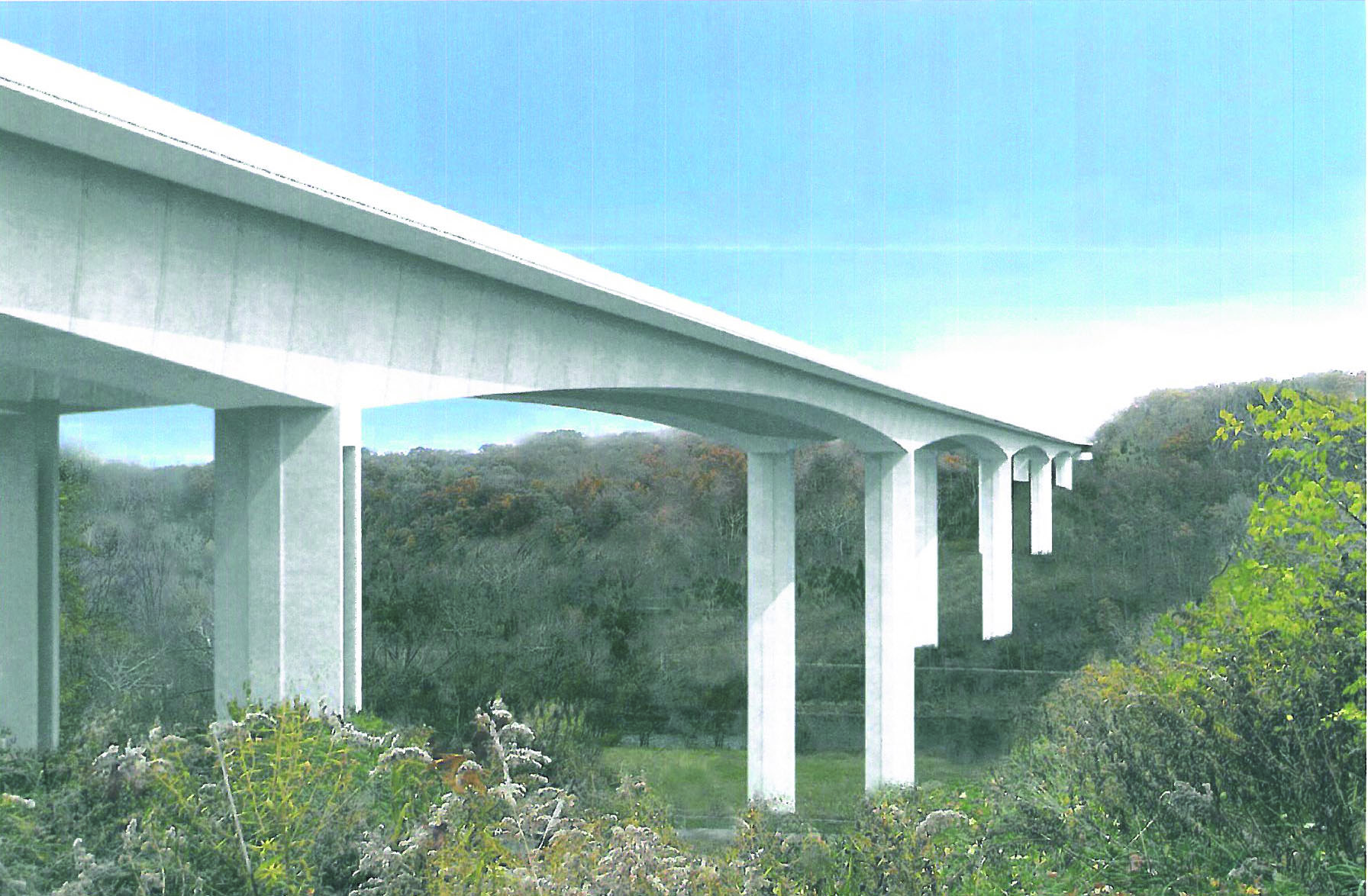
- ODOT drawing of the Jeremiah Morrow Bridge
- Coordinates: 39°25′9.76″N 84°6′14.47″W
- Carries: I-71
- Crosses: Little Miami River
- Locale: Fort Ancient and Oregonia, Ohio

Characteristics
- Design: Concrete box girder
- Total length: 2,252 ft (686 m)
- Width: 55 ft (17 m)
- Height: 239 ft (73 m)
- Longest span: 440 ft (130 m)
- Design life: 75 to 100 years

History
- Constructed by: Contractor: Kokosing Construction Site Services: Omnipro Services, LLC
- Construction start: 2 August 2010
- Construction end: 18 November 2016
- Construction cost: $88 million

Statistics
- Daily traffic: 40,000

Location
- Interactive map of Jeremiah Morrow Bridge

The Jeremiah Morrow Bridge is the name for a pair of concrete box girder bridges built between 2010 and 2016 which carries Interstate 71 over the Little Miami River gorge between Fort Ancient and Oregonia, Ohio. The bridges are named for former Governor of Ohio Jeremiah Morrow. It is one of the highest bridge in Ohio.

The bridges are 239 feet (73 m) above the river, making them the highest bridges in Ohio, and are 2,252 ft (686 m) long, 55 ft (17 m) wide, with 440 ft (130 m) main spans. The bridges each have two marked lanes with room for a third lane.

The original Warren truss bridges at the same location were opened to traffic in 1965 and were continuous across five spans. Both of the original spans were replaced beginning in 2010, with the completion of construction work marked with an official ribbon cutting ceremony held on November 18, 2016.

The original bridges were approximately the same design and age as the I-35W Mississippi River bridge which collapsed in 2007. Demolition of the original southbound bridge was largely completed on April 23, 2017. The original northbound bridge had been demolished in 2014 after one of the new bridges was complete.

== See also ==
- List of bridges in the United States by height
