= Galena Creek Bridge =

Highway bridge in Nevada

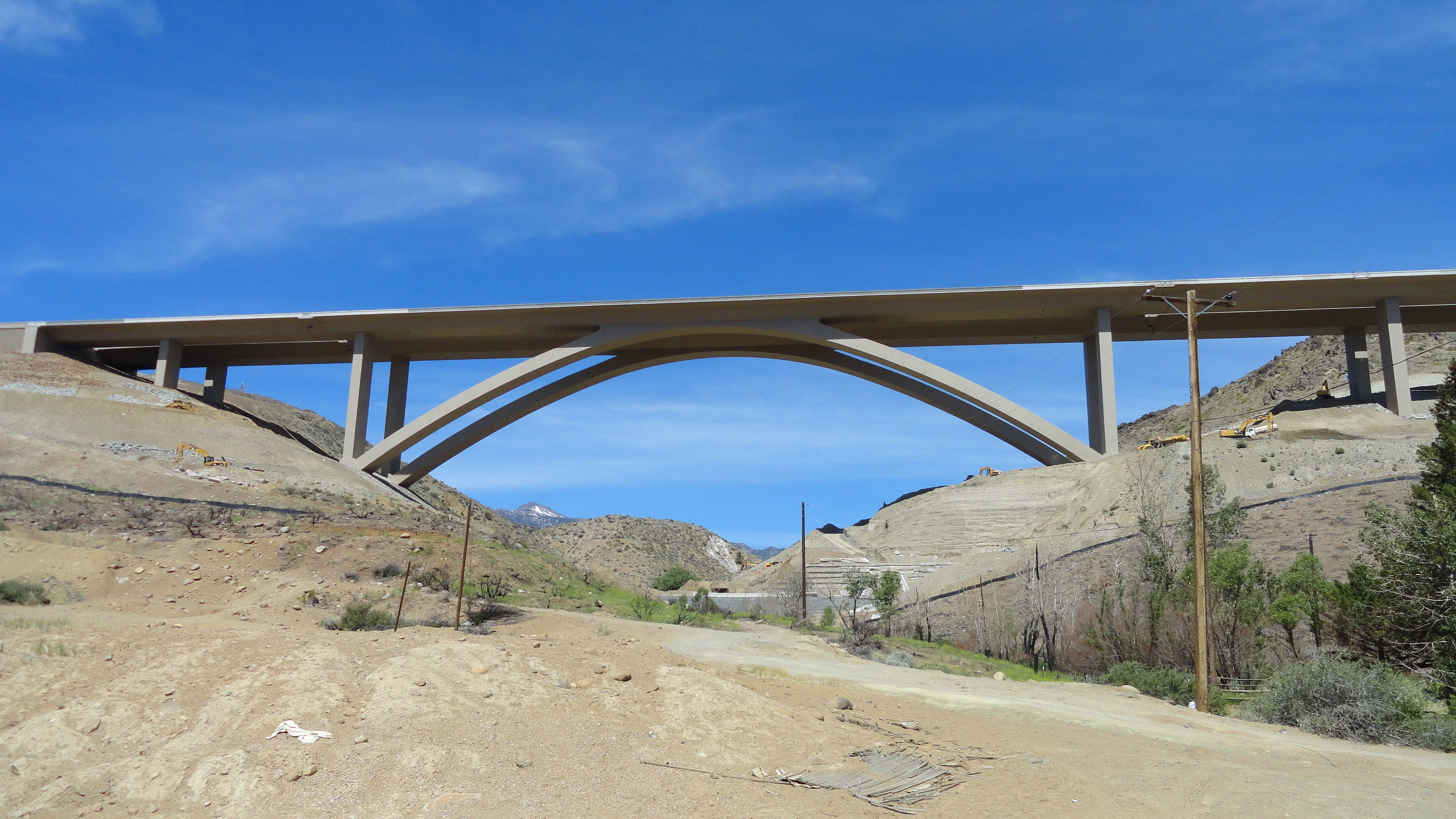
- Coordinates: 39.348826°N 119.791263°W
- Carries: I-580 / US 395
- Crosses: Galena Creek
- Locale: Washoe County, Nevada, U.S.
- Maintained by: Nevada Department of Transportation (NDOT)

Characteristics
- Design: Cathedral arch
- Material: Reinforced concrete
- Total length: 1,725 feet (526 m)
- Height: 295 feet (90 m)
- Longest span: 689 feet (210 m)
- No. of spans: 7

History
- Constructed by: C.C. Myers, Inc.
- Construction start: 2003
- Construction end: August 20, 2012
- Opened: Southbound lanes: August 21, 2012; Northbound lanes: August 30, 2012

Location
- Interactive map of Galena Creek Bridge

The Galena Creek Bridge is a twin-span concrete arch bridge in Washoe County, Nevada. The bridge carries Interstate 580 and U.S. Route 395 over Galena Creek between Carson City and Reno. It was opened to traffic in late August 2012.

The bridge has a total length of 1,725 feet (526 m) and a main span length of 689 feet (210 m). The height is 295 feet (90 m). The bridge is reportedly the largest cathedral arch bridge in the world; that is a type of open-spandrel deck arch bridge where the arch supports the deck only at the center.

Construction was started in 2003 but was delayed by a number of safety concerns and other issues. In 2006, the original prime contractor found the planned construction method unsafe; the method was revised and a new contractor hired. In 2010, several long superficial cracks were found. On July 28, 2012, the Nevada Department of Transportation held a community event for pedestrian, bicycle, and limited motor vehicle traffic to see the bridge prior to it opening for traffic; the bridge and freeway project opened in late August 2012.

== See also ==
- List of bridges in the United States by height
