= Sunlight Creek Bridge =

Steel beam bridge in Wyoming

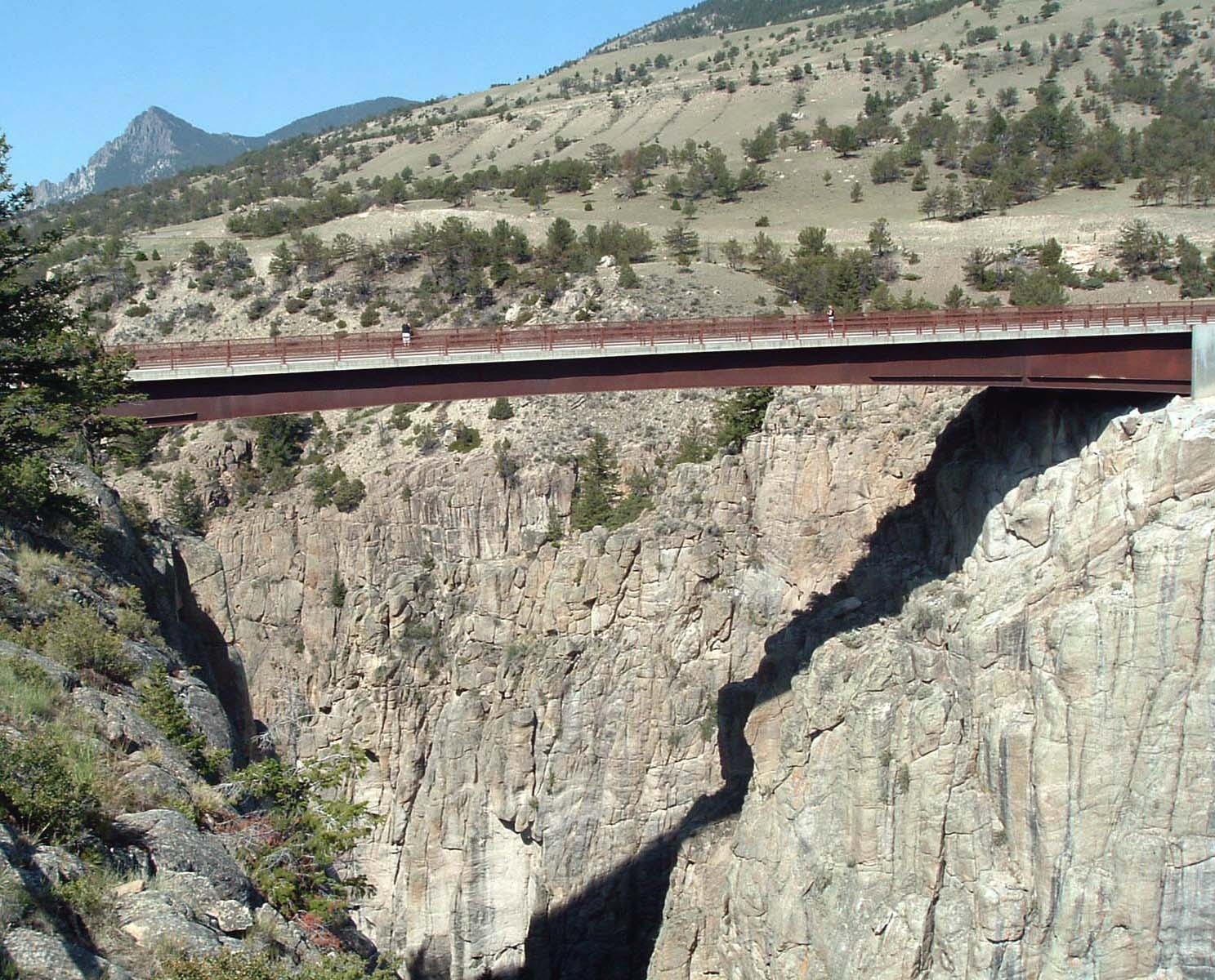
- Coordinates: 44°46′15″N 109°25′31″W
- Carries: Chief Joseph Scenic Byway (WY 296)
- Crosses: Sunlight Creek
- Other name: Sunlight Bridge
- Named for: Sunlight Creek

Characteristics
- Material: Steel
- Total length: 365.2 ft (111.3 m)
- Width: 32.2 ft (9.8 m)
- Longest span: 259.9 ft (79.2 m)
- Clearance below: 285.4 ft (87.0 m)
- No. of lanes: 2

History
- Opened: 1985

Statistics
- Daily traffic: 434 (in 2016)

Location
- Interactive map of Sunlight Creek Bridge

Sunlight Creek Bridge is a steel beam bridge in Park County, Wyoming, United States in the Shoshone National Forest and is the highest bridge in the state. It carries Chief Joseph Scenic Byway (Wyoming Highway 296) and pedestrian walkways on each side over the 285.4 ft (87.0 m) Sunlight Gorge carved by Sunlight Creek. The bridge was built in 1985.
