= Phil G. McDonald Bridge =

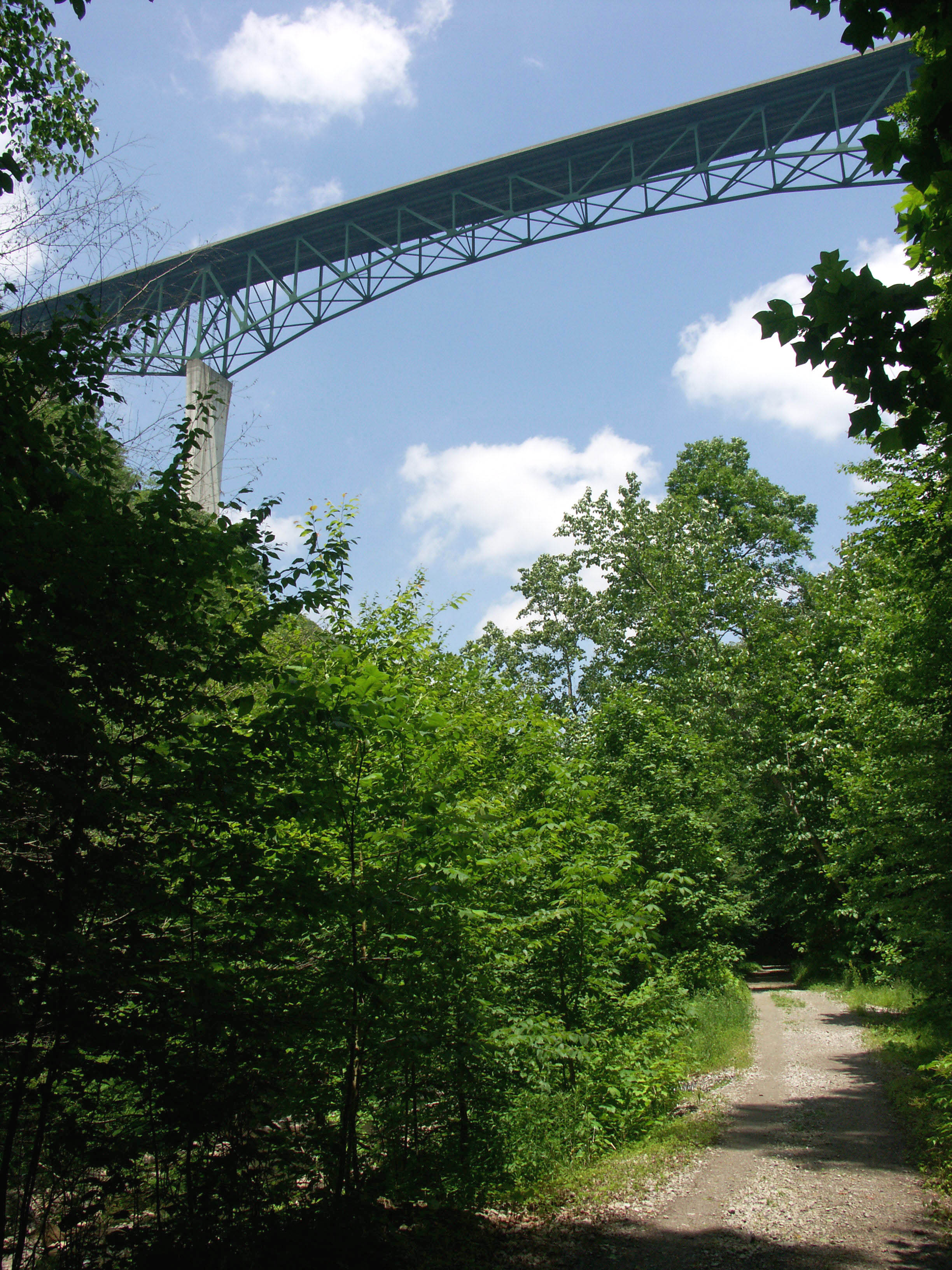
- Phil G. McDonald Bridge from bottom of Glade Creek canyon
- Coordinates: 37.768333°N 81.041667°W
- Carries: 4 lanes of I-64
- Crosses: Glade Creek (New River)
- Locale: Beckley, West Virginia, United States
- Other name: Glade Creek Bridge
- Owner: West Virginia Department of Transportation

Characteristics
- Design: Deck truss
- Total length: 2,179 ft (664 m)
- Height: 700 ft (213 m)
- Longest span: 784 ft (239 m)

History
- Construction cost: $29 million
- Opened: July 15, 1988

Location
- Interactive map of Phil G. McDonald Bridge

The Phil G. McDonald Memorial Bridge, also known as the Glade Creek Bridge, is a deck truss bridge located in Raleigh County, West Virginia near the city of Beckley. The bridge is among the ten highest bridges in the United States, and was the highest bridge within the Interstate Highway System (being a part of I-64) before the Mike O'Callaghan–Pat Tillman Memorial Bridge connecting Arizona and Nevada was designated as part of I-11 in 2018, with a deck height of 700 ft (213 m) above Glade Creek. The bridge is also among the top hundred highest bridges in the world.

The bridge is named after West Virginia native Phill G. McDonald (the official bridge name is missing the second 'L', although newer signs approaching the bridge have both 'L's) who was a United States Army soldier and a recipient of the United States military's highest decoration—the Medal of Honor—for his actions in the Vietnam War. The bridge has a main span length of 784 ft (239 m) and a total length of 2,179 ft (664 m). The completion of the bridge was the final part of I-64 to be built in West Virginia with Governor Arch Moore opening the bridge at a ribbon-cutting ceremony on 15 July 1988.
