= Kentucky Route 292 =

State highway in Kentucky, United States

Kentucky Route 292
- KY 292 highlighted in red

Route information
- Maintained by KYTC
- Length: 43.2 mi (69.5 km)

Major junctions
- South end: Upper Stringtown Road / Stringtown Court southeast of Burnwell
- US 119 in South Williamson; KY 612 northeast of Turkey Creek; US 52 northeast of Slatter Branch; KY 468 northeast of Hatfield; KY 40 in Warfield; KY 908 near Job
- North end: KY 3 near Job

Location
- Country: United States
- State: Kentucky
- Counties: Pike, Martin

Highway system
- Kentucky State Highway System; Interstate; US; State; Parkways
← KY 291	→ KY 293

Kentucky Route 292 (KY 292) is a 43.2-mile-long (69.5 km) state highway in the U.S. state of Kentucky. The highway connects mostly rural areas of Pike and Martin counties with South Williamson and Warfield. Nearly the entire highway is located near the West Virginia state line.

== Route description ==
=== Pike County ===
KY 292 begins at an intersection of Upper Stringtown Road and Stringtown Court southeast of Burnwell, within Pike County. It travels to the north-northwest, paralleling Tug Fork, and enters Burnwell. There, it passes McCoy Cemetery and crosses over Lower Stringtown Branch. It curves to the northeast and passes Phillips Cemetery before curving to the northwest. Then, it crosses over Maynard Branch. The highway then crosses over Buzzard Roost Hollow and curves to the southwest, where it enters Aflex. There, it crosses over Culler Hollow. It curves to the northwest and enters Goody, where it crosses over Pond Creek and intersects U.S. Route 119 (US 119). The two highways travel concurrently to the northwest and enter South Williamson. They intersect the southern terminus of KY 1506. When they split, KY 292 heads to the west-northwest. Then, it curves to the southwest. It crosses over Julius Branch and curves to the north-northwest. The highway curves to the west-southwest and passes Tug Valley ARH Regional Medical Center. It then intersects the eastern terminus of KY 612 (Turkey Creek Road). It crosses over Turkey Creek and curves to the northeast. The highway curves to the north-northwest and intersects Pennigton Drive, which leads to US 52 and US 119. After a crossing of Slater Branch, it curves to the northeast. During this curve, there is an interchange with US 52, but there is no access from KY 292 to the US highway. KY 292 travels under an overpass that carries US 52 and crosses over McCoy Branch. It curves to the northwest and then the west-northwest and travels under a second overpass that carries US 52. The highway crosses over Hurricane Branch and then curves to the north-northwest. It crosses over Negro Hollow. The highway curves to the west-northwest and intersects the northern terminus of KY 468. KY 292 turns right and heads to the north-northeast. It crosses over Big Creek, where it enters Martin County.

=== Martin County ===
Immediately, KY 292 crosses over some railroad tracks and then curves to the northeast. The highway passes Chapman Cemetery and then makes a northeastern curve to the west-southwest. It crosses over Jacks Branch and curves to the northwest, where it crosses the Left Fork Mount Sterling Branch. It curves to the north and crosses over Mount Sterling Branch. The highway makes another northeastern curve to the west-southwest before it curves to the north-northeast. After it passes Stepp Cemetery, it curves to the west-southwest. It crosses over Stepp Branch and curves to the northwest. KY 292 crosses over Long Branch and then curves to the north-northwest. It curves to the southwest and then back to the north-northeast. It curves to the north-northwest and crosses over some railroad tracks and Wolf Creek. Then, it enters Lovely. There, it intersects the northern terminus of KY 1714. It curves to the northwest and enters Warfield. There, it crosses over Collins Creek, curves to the west-northwest, crosses over Buck Creek, intersects the eastern terminus of KY 40 (Beauty Road), crosses over some railroad tracks, and curves to the north-northeast. The highway passes Warfield Park and curves to the northwest. It curves to the east-northeast and passes Warfield Elementary School. It curves to the west-northwest, the north, and the northwest. It crosses over Little Elk Creek, Williams Branch, and Chaffin Branch. KY 292 curves to the west-northwest and passes Chaffin Cemetery. It makes a northwestern curve to the south. After crossing over Jarrell Branch, it curves to the southwest. It curves to the west-southwest and crosses over Big Elk Creek. Then, it curves to the north-northwest. It curves to the northwest, crosses over Dry Fork Creek, and intersects the northern terminus of KY 908 (Turkey Creek Road). It turns right, to the north-northwest, and curves to the northeast and the west-northwest. The highway passes Harmon Cemetery and then has a slightly southward curve. It heads to the north-northwest and crosses over Calf Creek. It crosses over Flutylick Branch and then leaves Tug Fork. It then begins paralleling Buffalo Horn Branch and has a crossing of the branch. It passes Buffalo Horn Cemetery and meets its northern terminus, an intersection with KY 3.

== Major intersections ==
County	Location	mi	km	Destinations	Notes
Pike		0.0	0.0	Upper Stringtown Road / Stringtown Court	Southern terminus
Pike	Goody	5.1	8.2	US 119 south – Pikeville	Southern end of US 119 concurrency
Pike	South Williamson	5.4	8.7	KY 1506 north	Southern terminus of KY 1506
Pike	South Williamson	5.8	9.3	US 119 north – Logan	Northern end of US 119 concurrency
Pike		7.5	12.1	KY 612 west (Turkey Creek Road)	Eastern terminus of KY 612
Pike		9.6	15.4	US 52 – Williamson, Nolan	Interchange; no access from KY 292 to US 52
Pike		13.6	21.9	KY 468 south – Sidney	Northern terminus of KY 468
Martin	Lovely	25.8	41.5	KY 1714 south	Northern terminus of KY 1714
Martin	Warfield	27.5	44.3	KY 40 west	Eastern terminus of KY 40
Martin		37.8	60.8	KY 908 south (Turkey Creek Road)	Northern terminus of KY 908
Martin		43.2	69.5	KY 3	Northern terminus
1.000 mi = 1.609 km; 1.000 km = 0.621 mi: Concurrency terminus; Incomplete access
