= Kentucky Route 3174 =

State highway in Kentucky, United States

Kentucky Route 3174
- Corridor Q, Future US 460
- Section from US 23 / US 119 to Wolfpit highlighted in red

Route information
- Maintained by KYTC
- Length: 16.2 mi (26.1 km)
- Existed: 2014–present

Major junctions
- West end: US 23 / US 119 in Yeager
- KY 195 in Wolfpit; KY 80 in Elkhorn City
- East end: SR 460 at the Virginia state line near Breaks

Location
- Country: United States
- State: Kentucky
- Counties: Pike

Highway system
- Kentucky State Highway System; Interstate; US; State; Parkways
← KY 3173	→ KY 3175

Kentucky Route 3174 (KY 3174) is a 16.2-mile-long (26.1 km) state expressway in the U.S. state of Kentucky. The highway connects U.S. Route 23 / U.S. Route 119 in Yeager with Wolfpit, Elkhorn City, and the Virginia state line near Breaks.

In the future, upon completion of the Virginia segment and the connection to U.S. Route 121, KY 3174 will be redesignated U.S. Route 460. Kentucky Route 3174 is a part of a much greater freeway corridor connecting Pikeville, Kentucky to Interstate 81, in Christiansburg, Virginia, called "Corridor Q". Corridor Q is a part of the Appalachian Development Highway System, and US 460.

== Route description ==
Located entirely within Pike County, KY 3174 begins at an interchange with US 23 / US 119 in the community of Yeager, heading southeast to cross over KY 122 (Collins Highway) and bypass the community to the north. Winding is way through mountainous terrain for several miles, it passes through the communities of Greasy Creek, where it has an interchange with KY 3226 (Greasy Creek Road), and Wolfpit, where it has an interchange with KY 195 (Marrowbone Creek Road). The highway now crosses bridges over Marrowbone Creek and Pond Creek, of which the Pond Creek Bridge is the tallest bridge in the entire bridge in the entire state of Kentucky, as it travels through rural areas to enter the northern reaches of Elkhorn City (the neighborhood of Cedarville), where it crosses a bridge over the Russell Fork and has interchange with KY 80. Leaving Elkhorn City, the curves eastward as it crosses Beaver Creek and travels through more mountainous terrain for a few miles, coming to an end at the Virginia state line, with Corridor Q continuing on as State Route 460 (SR 460). The entire length of KY 3174 is a divided four-lane limited-access expressway.

== Major intersections ==
The entire route is in Pike County. All exits are unnumbered.

Location	mi	km	Destinations	Notes
Yeager	0.000	0.000	US 23 / US 119 (Corridor B) – Pikeville, Jenkins	Interchange
Greasy Creek	2.953	4.752	KY 3226 (Greasy Creek Road)	Interchange
	4.917	7.913	Wolfpit Branch Road	Interchange
	6.949	11.183	KY 195 – Marrowbone	Interchange
	7.4– 7.7	11.9– 12.4	Bridge over Marrowbone Creek (opened on October 31, 2025)	
	9.0– 9.2	14.5– 14.8	Bridge over Pond Creek (opened on October 31, 2025)	
Elkhorn City	11.2– 11.7	18.0– 18.8	Bridge over the Russell Fork (opened on October 31, 2025)	
Elkhorn City	11.8– 12.1	19.0– 19.5	KY 80 – Elkhorn City	Interchange; opened in 2023
	16.2	26.1	SR 460 east (Corridor Q) – Breaks Interstate Park, Breaks	Continuation into Virginia; eastern terminus; opened in 2023
1.000 mi = 1.609 km; 1.000 km = 0.621 mi
