= Kentucky Route 195 =

Highway in Kentucky, USA

Kentucky Route 195
- KY 195 highlighted in red

Route information
- Maintained by KYTC
- Length: 11.6 mi (18.7 km)

Major junctions
- South end: KY 197 in Ashcamp
- KY 611 in Lookout; KY 3174 near Wolfpit
- North end: US 460 / KY 80 in Marrowbone

Location
- Country: United States
- State: Kentucky
- Counties: Pike

Highway system
- Kentucky State Highway System; Interstate; US; State; Parkways
← KY 194	→ KY 196

Kentucky Route 195 (KY 195) is an 11.6-mile-long (18.7 km) state highway in the U.S. state of Kentucky. The highway connects Ashcamp with Marrowbone with mostly rural areas of Pike County.

== Route description ==
KY 195 begins at an intersection with KY 197 in Ashcamp, within Pike County. It travels in a fairly northwestern direction. It curves to the north-northwest, at a point just north of Hellier, and begins paralleling Marrowbone Creek. It travels through Big Branch. It then crosses over Marrowbone Creek and passes Maritha Johnson Cemetery just before curving to the northeast. Just before entering Lookout, it has a second crossing of Marrowbone Creek. In Lookout, it intersects the eastern terminus of KY 611 (Poor Bottom Road). KY 195 travels through Rockhouse and curves to the east. It curves to the north-northeast to have an interchange with KY 3174 (Corridor Q, future US 460) and a third crossing of Marrowbone Creek just south of Wolfpit. Just before leaving Wolfpit, it crosses Wolfpit Branch. The highway immediately curves to the northeast. It crosses over some railroad tracks and crosses over Russell Fork on the Earl Johnson Memorial Bridge just before meets its northern terminus, an intersection with US 460/KY 80 (Regina Belcher Highway).

== Major intersections ==
The entire route is in Pike County.

Location	mi	km	Destinations	Notes
Ashcamp	0.0	0.0	KY 197 – Jenkins, Elkhorn City	Southern terminus
Lookout	5.3	8.5	KY 611 west (Poor Bottom Road)	Eastern terminus of KY 611
	9.4	15.1	KY 3174 (Corridor Q) – Pikeville, Elkhorn City	Future US 460
	11.5	18.5	Earl Johnson Memorial Bridge over Russell Fork	
	11.6	18.7	US 460 / KY 80 (Regina Belcher Highway) – Pikeville, Elkhorn City	Northern terminus
1.000 mi = 1.609 km; 1.000 km = 0.621 mi
