= Varina-Enon Bridge =

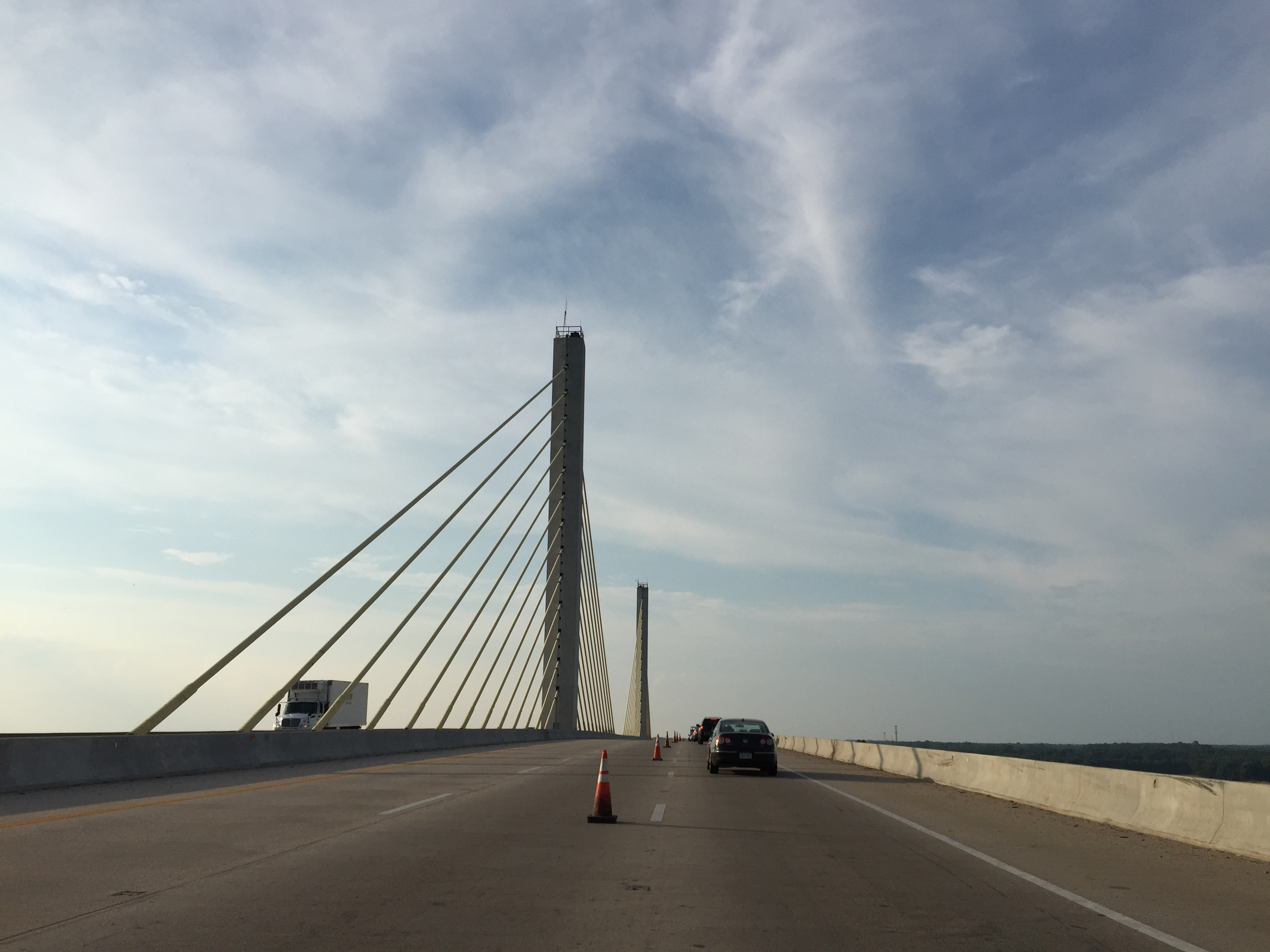
- Coordinates: 37°22′47″N 77°20′47″W
- Carries: 6 lanes of I-295
- Crosses: James River
- Locale: Chesterfield and Henrico counties, Virginia
- Maintained by: Virginia Department of Transportation

Characteristics
- Design: Cable-stayed bridge
- Total length: 4,680 feet
- Width: 109 feet
- Height: 295 feet
- Longest span: 630 feet
- Clearance above: 409 feet
- Clearance below: 150 feet

History
- Opened: July 18, 1990

Statistics
- Daily traffic: 38,977 (2002)

Location
- Interactive map of Varina-Enon Bridge

Varina-Enon Bridge is a cable-stayed bridge which carries Interstate 295 across the James River near Dutch Gap between Henrico County near Richmond and Chesterfield County near Hopewell, Virginia. It was opened to traffic in July 1990.

The Varina-Enon Bridge has six lanes (three lanes each way) with full right and left shoulders, with 150 feet (46 m) of vertical navigational clearance and 630 feet (190 m) of horizontal navigational clearance. The bridge spans the shipping channel that leads to the Port of Richmond. The overall bridge length is 4,680 feet (1,430 m).

The bridge is owned and maintained by the Virginia Department of Transportation (VDOT). It was named for Varina, the original county seat of Henrico County which was located near the north end, and Enon, a small community near the south end in Chesterfield County.

This bridge was also affected by the 1993 tornado that destroyed half of the Historic District of Petersburg, a Wal-Mart in nearby Colonial Heights, and damaged portions of the city of Hopewell.

== Design ==
The design was selected because a high level was needed to clear a shipping channel, but there was a strong desire to avoid a drawbridge configuration following the collision of the SS Marine Floridian into the Benjamin Harrison Bridge at Jordan Point, a few miles downstream, in 1977. That complex bridge structure was out of service for over a year. At 157 feet (48 m) tall, the Varina-Enon Bridge was the tallest bridge in Virginia when it opened; it is now third-tallest, behind the 225-foot (69 m) US 460/Corridor Q bridge over Grassy Creek connecting Buchanan County with Pike County, Kentucky (opened in 2016) and the 175-foot (53 m) Wilson Creek Bridge carrying the Virginia Smart Road over Wilson Creek in Montgomery County (opened in 2001).

It is similar in design to the Senator William V. Roth Jr. Bridge in Delaware, which was completed 5 years after the Varina-Enon Bridge.

== Peregrine falcons program ==
Eastern Virginia has long been a habitat for endangered birds, notably eagles and peregrine falcons. The Virginia Department of Transportation (VDOT) has come to learn that some of its high bridge structures closely match their preferred nesting environment on cliff faces and in high trees.

In an award-winning program, nesting boxes for these rare birds were established in several bridges. Bridge pairs now represent approximately 30 percent of the Virginia peregrine falcon population. In a major victory for the endangered species, and VDOT's environmental efforts, in the spring of 2003, nearly a dozen peregrine falcon chicks were hatched. Most were taken from their nesting boxes on various VDOT bridges for banding and release to their natural habitat.

That spring, three eyases (falcon chicks) on the Benjamin Harrison Bridge on State Route 156 over the James River were banded with a transmitter for tracking purposes, and two were released at Shenandoah National Park. Environmentalists prefer to leave one chick with its parents when possible, but the birds have a better chance of staying alive when released in the wild. One concern is that a falcon learning to fly may not survive a fall onto a bridge or even the water below. Bridge employees keep the Center for Conservation Biology at the College of William and Mary informed of the birds' movements.

Peregrine falcons were listed as federally endangered in 1970 under the Endangered Species Conservation Act. At that time, there were virtually none in the east, and the population in the rest of the country had fallen by 80 to 90%. Beginning in the 1970s, a national effort was undertaken to recover breeding populations and to restore the species. Their population has significantly recovered over the past 30 years, thanks to conservation efforts such as VDOT's. Today, more than 1,500 breeding pairs have been counted in the U.S. and Canada.

Along with the U.S. Fish and Wildlife service, the Virginia Department of Game and Inland Fisheries and the Conservation Center, VDOT monitors the falcons on each bridge to ensure they and their habitat are doing well. VDOT has even established falcon-specific contract requirements for the Structure and Bridge Division as it continues to identify other nesting sites.

Through placement of nesting boxes on 10 bridges maintained by VDOT, including the Varina-Enon Bridge, the endangered peregrine falcons—considered the world's fastest birds—once again fly high over Virginia's eastern seaboard. Because of the significant role it played in the recovery of the peregrine falcon in Virginia, VDOT earned the 1998 Federal Highway Administration Excellence Award in the category of Environment Protection and Enhancements.

== See also ==
- List of bridges in the United States by height
