= Burnwell =

Burnwell may refer to:

- Burnwell, Alabama, a community in Walker County
- Burnwell, Kentucky, a community in Pike County
- Burnwell, West Virginia, a community in Kanawha County
- Burnwell meteorite, a meteorite fallen in Kentucky
