= Ruthdale, West Virginia =

- Unincorporated community
- Location within West Virginia Location within the United States
- Coordinates: 38°19′11″N 81°43′22″W
- Country: United States
- State: West Virginia
- County: Kanawha
- Elevation: 860 ft (260 m)
- Time zone: UTC-5 (Eastern (EST))
  - Summer (DST): UTC-4 (EDT)
- Area codes: 304 & 681
- GNIS feature ID: 1555546

Ruthdale is an unincorporated community in Kanawha County, West Virginia, United States. Ruthdale is located along U.S. Route 119 and West Virginia Route 214, 5.5 miles (8.9 km) west-southwest of Charleston.
