= Corridor Q =

Highway in the United States

Corridor Q

Major junctions
- West end: US 23 / US 119 (Corr. B) near Pikeville, KY
- US 19 near Richlands, VA; US 52 in Bluefield, WV; I-77 near Princeton, WV
- East end: I-81 in Christiansburg, VA

Location
- Country: United States

Highway system
- United States Numbered Highway System; List; Special; Divided

Corridor Q is a highway in the U.S. states of Kentucky, Virginia, and West Virginia. It is part of the Appalachian Development Highway System and U.S. Route 460. Corridor Q runs from Corridor B (US 23/US 119) near Pikeville, Kentucky, easterly to Interstate 81 in Christiansburg, Virginia.

Corridor Q does not meet any ADHS Corridors other than B, but it meets the planned Coalfields Expressway (U.S. Route 121) near Grundy, Virginia, the King Coal Highway (U.S. Route 52) in Bluefield, West Virginia, and Interstate 77 just to the east near Princeton. At its west end, traffic can continue northwesterly along Corridor B, Corridor R, Corridor I, and Interstate 64 to reach Lexington, Kentucky. The part of Corridor Q east of Bluefield is part of the future I-73/74 North-South Corridor.

== History ==
=== Kentucky ===
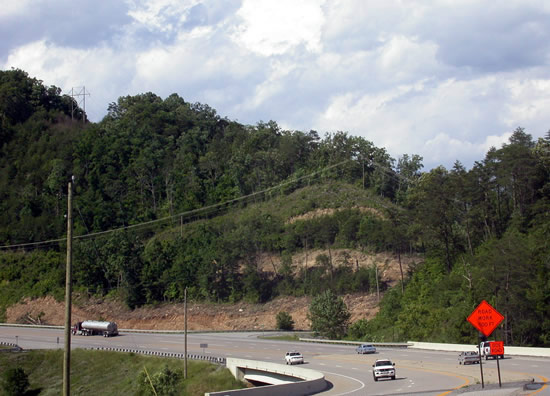
Corridor Q's western terminus at Corridor B/US 23/US 119 in 2006. An interchange has since been completed at this location.

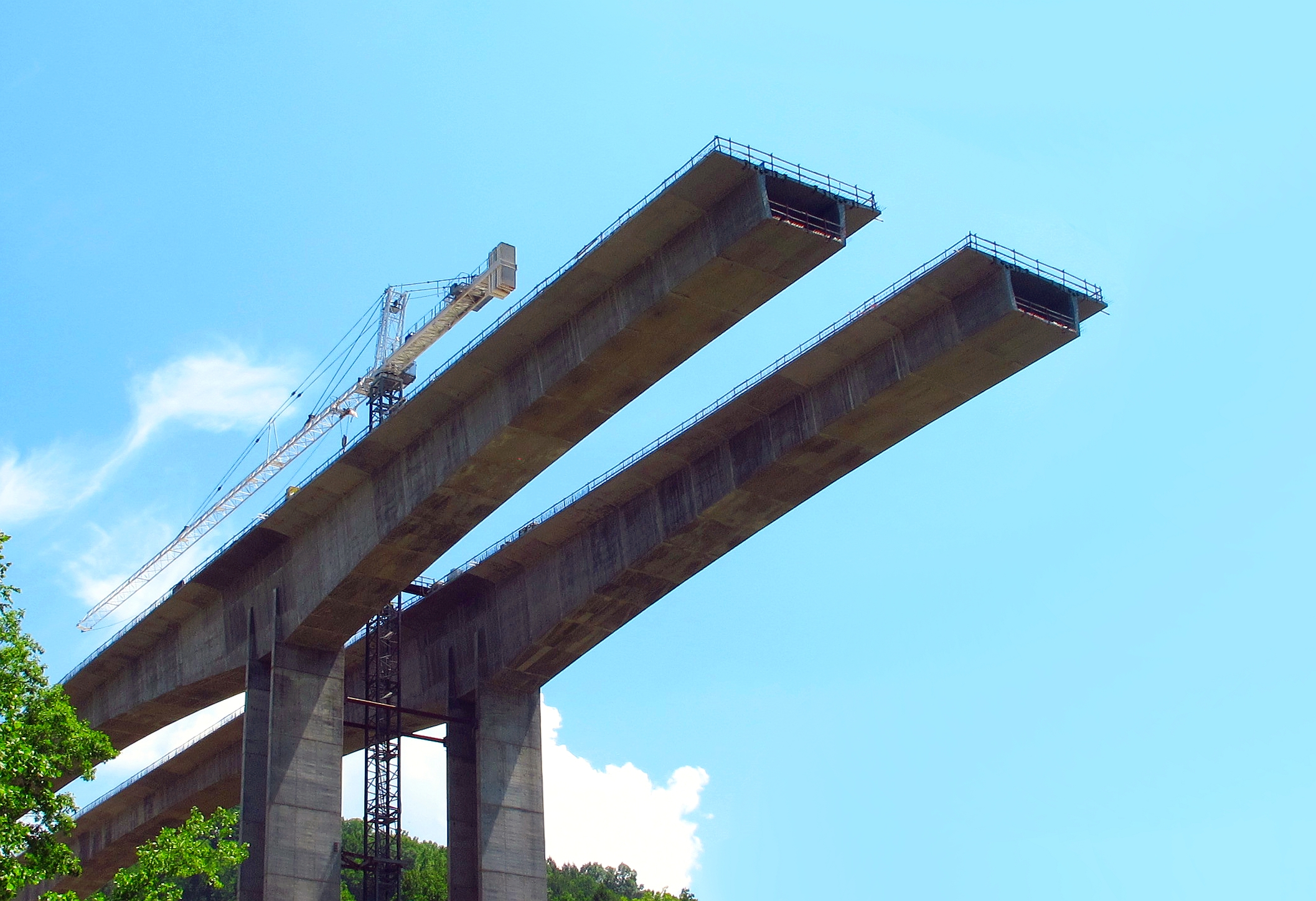
Corridor Q in Dickenson County, Virginia

Corridor Q in Kentucky exists between Corridor B/US 23/US 119 at Yeager to VA 80 near Breaks, Virginia. The corridor is expected to continue southeastward to the Coalfields Expressway approximately five miles (8.0 km) from the Kentucky state line. The new four-lane relocation of US 460 (currently signed as KY 3174) will include interchanges at US 23, Greasy Creek Road, KY 195 and at KY 80. An eight-mile segment of the new US 460 realignment opened from US 23 to Wolfpit Branch Road on December 18, 2014.

==== US 460 realignment construction ====
- Section 1: US 460 departs from US 23 / US 119 at Yeager and heads southeast towards Stagger Fork. An at-grade intersection was constructed at US 23 / US 119, however it was grade-separated in 2008. This section is complete.
- Section 2: US 460 will extend eastward from Stagger Fork to Greasy Creek Road. A diamond interchange is planned for the eastern terminus of this section. This section is complete.
- Section 3: The highway will extend further east from the Greasy Creek Road interchange to Snake Branch. This section is complete.
- Section 4
  - Section 4A: The relocation continues from Snake Branch to Wolpit Branch. This section is complete.
  - Section 4B: US 460 continues from Wolfpit Branch to KY 195. This section is complete.
- Section 5: The highway will continue eastward from the KY 195 interchange to Laurel Branch. The KY 195 interchange will be constructed during this phase. Construction began in 2009 and was completed on October 31, 2025.
- Section 6
  - Section 6A: This section extends from Laurel Branch to Pond Creek. Construction began in 2010 and was completed on October 31, 2025.
  - Pond Creek Bridge - Construction began in 2015 and was completed on October 31, 2025.
  - Section 6B: The route is extended east to Russell Fork. Construction began on this segment in 2011 and was completed on October 31, 2025.
  - Section 6C: This involves the construction of a bridge spanning Russell Fork and KY 80. Construction began on this segment in 2016 and was completed on October 31, 2025.
- Section 7
  - Section 7JMB: This involved the construction of a bridge over Russell Fork just west of Elkhorn City for John Moore Branch Road. Construction on this segment is complete.
  - Section 7A: This section of US 460 extends from KY 80 to 3,000 feet (910 m) east of Beaver Creek. It includes an interchange with KY 80. Construction on this segment began in 2006 and is now complete as of 2023.
  - 7A-2 Construction began in 2016, completed in 2023.
  - Section 7B: This extends from 3,000 feet (910 m) east of Beaver Creek to KY 1373. Construction on this segment began in 2006 and has been completed.
- Section 8: US 460 will extend east from KY 1373 to the Virginia state line. Construction began on this segment in 2013, completed in 2023.
- Section 9V: This section, constructed by the Virginia Department of Transportation, will include the connection to VA 80. Construction began on this segment in 2010, open to VA 744 (Southern Gap Road) by 2023.

=== Virginia ===
In the early 1970s, the former Virginian Railway right-of-way along the north bank of the New River eastward from a point near the VA-WV state line near Glen Lyn to Narrows was acquired by VDOT's predecessor agency from the Norfolk and Western Railway to enable four-laning of the highway through the narrow space between the river and rocky bluffs. (The N&W main line follows the south bank through this area). Along this stretch of highway (From the WV-VA state line until Pearisburg, VA.) the speed limit fluctuates multiple times, with posted limits quickly dropping to as low as 40 miles per hour. Police presence along the highway is especially high in the town of Narrows, VA. (Where the speed limit is 40 miles per hour).

Traveling further east, U.S. 460 climbs the mountain. After leaving Giles County and entering Montgomery County, views of the Blacksburg countryside are visible on the south side of the mountain. As the highway begins the long descent down the mountain, travelers enter Blacksburg's limits. There are several ways to access Downtown Blacksburg from U.S. 460 (Listed in order as if traveling Eastbound).

- North Main Street (Business 460): 4-way intersection (Farmingdale Lane to the right, North Main Street to the left)
- Toms Creek Road: Limited-access interchange with right exit. This exit is convenient for destinations on Patrick Henry Drive (primarily high-density residential), and also the northern end of University City Blvd. Continuing southbound on Toms Creek Road provides access to the northern end of the Virginia Tech campus.
- Prices Fork Road: Limited-access interchange with right-hand exit. This exit is convenient for lodging and the University Mall area, on the southern end of University City Blvd. and off-campus housing. From the west (U.S. 460), Prices Fork Road is the preferred way to travel into Downtown Blacksburg or one of two ways to access the Virginia Tech campus.
- Southgate Drive: A modified diverging-diamond high-speed interchange runs directly into the Virginia Tech campus. This is the preferred entrance point for the athletic complex and Lane Stadium. It is also the best entrance for the Virginia Tech Montgomery Executive Airport and Corporate Research Center, both of which are located on Research Center Drive, along with the Virginia College of Osteopathic Medicine (VCOM). This project replaced a signaled 3-way intersection in 2018.
- South Main Street (Business 460): Limited-access interchange with right-hand exit heading north on S. Main Street returns towards Blacksburg. Traveling south takes travelers past LewisGale Hospital Montgomery and into Uptown Christiansburg.

After passing the South Main Street exit, U.S. 460 travelers are now in the vicinity of Christiansburg.

- VA 114: Limited-access interchange that serves the large commercial area of Christiansburg that necessitated construction of the bypass; VA 114 continues west to the Radford Army Ammunition Plant and ends at U.S. 11 in the Fairlawn section of Pulaski County.
- North Franklin and Depot streets: Limited-access interchange that funnels traffic into a convoluted intersection with North Franklin Street (traffic south into downtown Christiansburg) and Depot Street (west to a large conglomeration of subdivisions, east to the Cambria section of Christiansburg). There is a ramp that allows eastbound travelers to reach North Franklin Street going northbound; westbound travelers can exit to North Franklin Street in both directions.
- Roanoke Street/U.S. 460 Business/U.S. 11: Limited-access interchange at the south (east) end of the original Christiansburg bypass. Roanoke Street to the west reaches downtown Christiansburg, while traveling east serves a commercial strip before reaching the original interchange with I-81.
- I-81: The highway continues to an interchange with direct access to I-81 via collector roads, continuing east to the original Roanoke Street exit, where U.S. 460 continues east toward Shawsville, Elliston, Salem, and Roanoke. The road beyond the interchange continues as Falling Branch Road.

Presently, U.S. 460 Business (South Main Street, but becomes North Franklin Street upon entering Christiansburg) runs through downtown Christiansburg and U.S. 460 Bypass runs just outside the town.

==== Future ====
Future plans include converting the Smart Road into a 5.7-mile limited-access highway, connecting Blacksburg directly to I-81. The VDOT Projects and Studies website for the Smart Road project states under Phase 1, "Western end has large turnaround for normal-speed turns by test vehicles. Will link with Route 460 Business and Bypass and new Blacksburg interchange for 460 Bypass (under construction) for regular traffic when phase 3 completed". At this point in time, ramps are partially complete, but inaccessible.

=== West Virginia ===
Corridor Q in West Virginia comprises US 19, US 52 and US 460 all within Mercer County.

The section from the Virginia state line east to US 19/WV 112 opened in 1977 at a distance of 5.38 miles (8.66 km). It forms a southern bypass of Bluefield and features a small concurrency with US 52; it is signed as US 460 otherwise. During the same year, the section of US 19 and US 460 that run concurrent between WV 112 and CR 19–33 at Maple Acres opened (MP 5.38 to MP 8.68). The segment between Maple Acres and the US 19 intersection southwest of Princeton opened in 1967 (MP 8.68 to 10.70). The corridor between WV 112 and the northern US 19 intersection is signed both US 19 and US 460 (MP 5.38 to 10.70).

In 1978, a southern bypass of Princeton opened from the northern US 19 intersection southwest of the city to the WV 104 intersection just west of Interstate 77 (MP 10.73 to MP 15.35). The four-lane road at the Interstate 77 junction opened nine-years prior (MP 15.35 to MP 15.84).

The remainder of the highway between the Interstate 77 junction and the Virginia state line at Glen Lyn opened in 1972 and 1973 (MP 15.84 to 27.06).

The only modification to the highway, with the exclusion of various traffic signal additions between Bluefield and Princeton, is an incomplete interchange with the King Coal Highway at the eastern US 52 junction east of Bluefield. The $27 million interchange opened in the early 2000s with the four-lane upgrade of US 52 between US 460 and Interstate 77.
