= Southside Mall =

Southside Mall may refer to:

- South Side Mall (South Williamson, Kentucky)
- Southside Mall (Oneonta, New York)
- Southside Wandsworth, UK
