= Marrowbone, Kentucky =

Marrowbone, Kentucky may refer to the following places in the U.S. state of Kentucky:

- Marrowbone, Cumberland County, Kentucky
- Marrowbone, Pike County, Kentucky
