= Kentucky Route 468 =

State highway in Kentucky, United States

Kentucky Route 468
- North Big Creek Road
- KY 468 highlighted in red

Route information
- Maintained by KYTC
- Length: 13.560 mi (21.823 km)

Major junctions
- South end: KY 3220 at Sidney
- North end: KY 292 near Nolan WV

Location
- Country: United States
- State: Kentucky
- Counties: Pike

Highway system
- Kentucky State Highway System; Interstate; US; State; Parkways
← KY 467	→ KY 469

Kentucky Route 468 (KY 468) is a 13.560-mile-long (21.823 km) state highway in Pike County, Kentucky, that runs from KY 3220 at Sidney to KY 292 northwest of Nolan, West Virginia, near the Kentucky-West Virginia state line. It runs parallel to Big Creek for its entire length and is thus known as North Big Creek Road for its entire length.

== Major intersections ==
The entire route is in Pike County.

Location	mi	km	Destinations	Notes
Sidney	0.000	0.000	KY 3220 (Bent Mountain Road / East Big Creek Road)	Southern terminus
	7.336	11.806	KY 612 east (Long Branch Road)	Western terminus of KY 612
	13.560	21.823	KY 292 – Inez	Northern terminus
1.000 mi = 1.609 km; 1.000 km = 0.621 mi
