= Verlin Adams =

American football player (1918–1985)

No. 28
- Positions: Defensive end, linebacker, tackle, guard

Personal information
- Born: July 14, 1918; Burnwell, Kentucky, U.S.
- Died: April 30, 1985 (aged 66); Charleston, West Virginia, U.S.
- Listed height: 6 ft 0 in (1.83 m)
- Listed weight: 205 lb (93 kg)

Career information
- High school: Williamson
- College: Charleston (WV)
- NFL draft: 1943: 31st round, 291st overall pick

Career history

Playing
- New York Giants (1943–1945)

Coaching
- Charleston Rockets (1965-1967) Assistant coach; Charleston Rockets (1968) Line coach

Career NFL statistics
- Games played: 12
- Interceptions: 1
- Stats at Pro Football Reference

Verlin Talmadge Adams (July 14, 1918 – April 30, 1985) was an American professional football player in the National Football League (NFL). Born in Burnwell, Kentucky, he played college football for the University of Charleston in Charleston, West Virginia. Adams was drafted by the New York Giants in the 31st round (291st overall) of the 1943 NFL draft. He played for the Giants from 1943 to 1945. Adams played as a tackle and wore number 28.
