= Grassy Creek Bridge =

Bridge in Breaks, Virginia, United States

- Coordinates: 37°18′36″N 82°17′16″W
- Carries: 4 lanes of Corridor Q (VA 460)
- Crosses: Grassy Creek; Conaway Road (SR 610)
- Named for: Grassy Creek

Characteristics
- Material: Concrete
- Total length: 1,733 ft (528 m)
- Width: 43 ft (13 m)
- Height: 265 ft (81 m)

History
- Opened: November 16, 2020

The Grassy Creek Bridge is a concrete dual-span bridge in Breaks, Virginia, United States. Opened in 2020, the bridge carries Corridor Q (Virginia State Route 460) across Grassy Creek, a tributary of the Russell Fork and is located immediately southeast of the Kentucky border. It is the tallest and highest bridge in the state.

== History ==
Construction of the Grassy Creek Bridge began in January 2011, with the intention to carry a new alignment of U.S. Route 460 (currently signed as State Route 460) through the Appalachian Mountains. The new alignment, named Corridor Q, is part of the Appalachian Development Highway System and will run from Pikeville, Kentucky, to Christiansburg, Virginia, when completed. The Grassy Creek Bridge project was listed as no. 1 on the Roads & Bridges 2013 Top 10 Bridges list.

With a construction cost of approximately $100 million, the bridge was completed in September 2015 and became the tallest and highest in the state, but was dubbed a "bridge to nowhere" as the highway leading to it remained under-construction. On November 16, 2020, the Grassy Creek Bridge and the segment of Corridor Q it carried were opened to traffic.

== Specifications ==
Each span of the Grassy Creek Bridge is 265 ft (81 m) tall, 1,733 ft (528 m) long, and 43 ft (13 m) and two highway travel lanes wide. The piers are constructed of concrete and are each reinforced by approximately 300,000 lb (140,000 kg) of steel. The concrete columns were intended to be box-shaped, but the contractor constructing the bridge decided to use column design with a horizontal cross section resembling an H-shape.

== See also ==
- List of bridges in the United States by height
