= Kentucky Route 197 =

State highway in Kentucky, United States

Kentucky Route 197
- KY 197 highlighted in red

Route information
- Maintained by KYTC
- Length: 16.6 mi (26.7 km)

Major junctions
- South end: KY 805 northeast of Jenkins
- KY 195 in Ashcamp
- North end: KY 80 in Elkhorn City

Location
- Country: United States
- State: Kentucky
- Counties: Pike

Highway system
- Kentucky State Highway System; Interstate; US; State; Parkways
← KY 196	→ KY 198

Kentucky Route 197 (KY 197) is a 16.6-mile-long (26.7 km) state highway in the U.S. state of Kentucky. The highway connects rural areas of Pike County with Elkhorn City.

== Route description ==
KY 197 begins at an intersection with KY 805 at a point northeast of Jenkins, within Pike County. It travels to the northeast, paralleling Elkhorn Creek, and is a very curvy highway. It crosses over Panther and Upper Pigeon branches and Sycamore Creek. In Ashcamp, the highway intersects the southern terminus of KY 195 (Ashcamp Road). After a crossing of Elkhorn Creek, it curves to the north-northeast. It travels through Senterville and enters Elkhorn City. It passes Elkhorn City Elementary School and meets its northern terminus, an intersection with KY 80 (Patty Loveless Drive).

== Major intersections ==
The entire route is in Pike County.

Location	mi	km	Destinations	Notes
	0.0	0.0	KY 805	Southern terminus
Ashcamp	9.8	15.8	KY 195 north (Ashcamp Road)	Southern terminus of KY 195
Elkhorn City	16.6	26.7	KY 80 (Patty Loveless Drive) – Pikeville, Breaks Park, Pine Mountain Trail State Park	Northern terminus
1.000 mi = 1.609 km; 1.000 km = 0.621 mi
