= South Side Mall (South Williamson, Kentucky) =

Shopping mall in South Williamson, Kentucky

Coordinates: 37.65427°N 82.27416°W

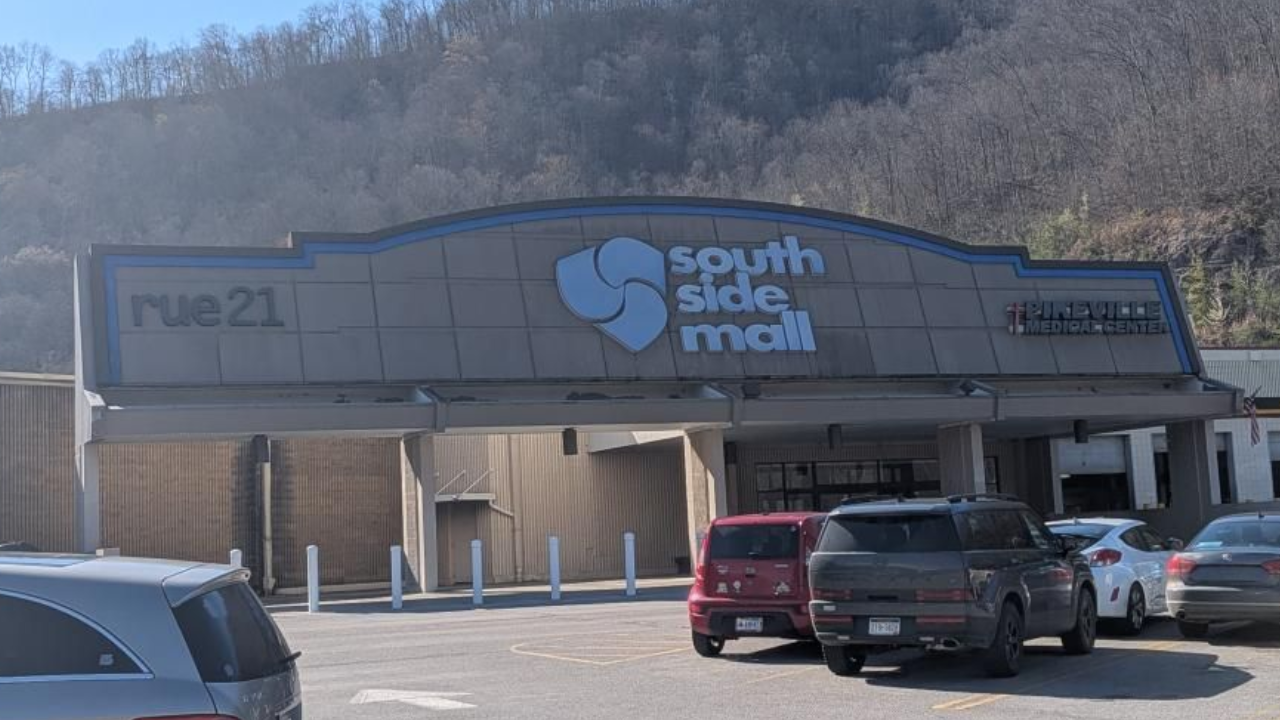
- South Side Mall in 2026.
- Location: South Williamson, Kentucky
- Address: 275 South Side Mall Road
- Opened: September 1981
- Developer: Richard E. Jacobs, David Hocker
- Manager: S & E Enterprise, LLC
- Owner: Hannah Family
- Num. of stores: 37+
- Num. of anchor tenants: 5 (1 vacant)
- Floor area: 300,000 sq ft (28,000 m^{2})
- Floors: 1
- Website: website

South Side Mall is an enclosed shopping mall in South Williamson, Kentucky, on U.S. Route 119. Anchor stores are Shoe Show Mega Store and Tractor Supply Company. The mall is also home to South Side Theater.

== History ==
David Hocker and Richard E. Jacobs group developed the mall in 1980 located in Kentucky but largely serving Williamson, West Virginia. Original tenants included Kroger/SuperX Drugstore, Kmart, and R. H. Hobbs department store. Dawahares was also an anchor store. By 1983, R. H. Hobbs had closed and been converted to Watson's, which in turn was sold to Peebles in 1998. The Kmart, later the site of Magic Mart, closed in 2002. Dawahares is now Shoe Show.

Magic Mart announced that it would close the South Side Mall store in mid-2016.

On March 3, 2020, Peebles was converted into Gordmans, which in turn was closed in July 2020, following the filings of bankruptcy from the company.

The Sears Hometown Store closed in February 2023 and the owners of the store reopened the store in October 2023 as Blackburns Hometown Store.
