= West Virginia Route 214 =

State highway in West Virginia, United States

West Virginia Route 214

Route information
- Maintained by WVDOH
- Length: 22.0 mi (35.4 km)
- Existed: 1972–present

Major junctions
- South end: WV 3 in Yawkey
- North end: US 119 / WV 601 near South Charleston

Location
- Country: United States
- State: West Virginia
- Counties: Lincoln, Kanawha

Highway system
- West Virginia State Highway System; Interstate; US; State
← WV 211	→ WV 218

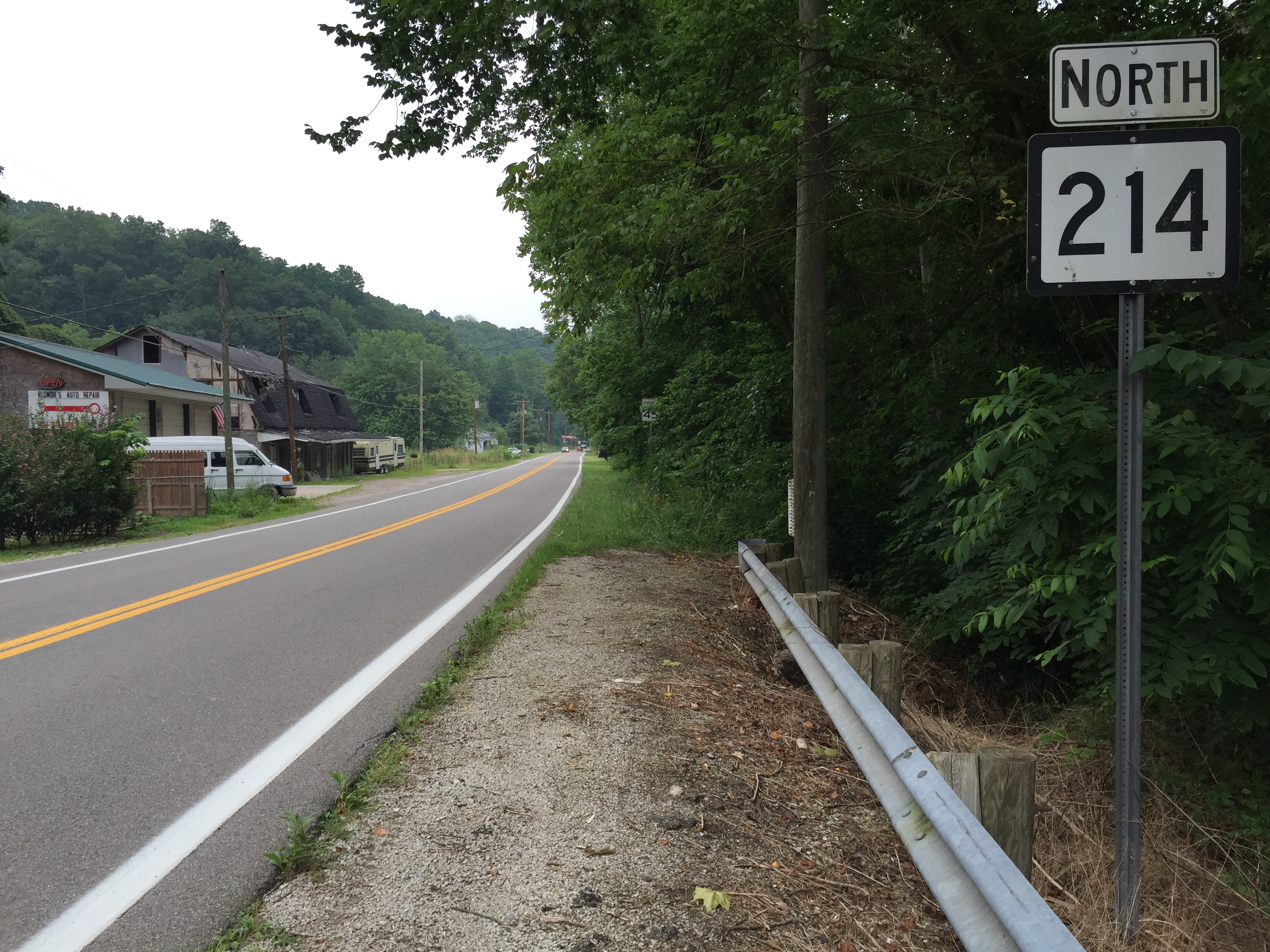
View north along WV 214 north of CR 1/2 in Priestley

West Virginia Route 214 is a north–south state highway located in the western portion of the U.S. state of West Virginia. Although the route maintains an east–west routing for most of its length, the route is signed as north–south. The southern terminus of the route is at West Virginia Route 3 southeast of Griffithsville. The northern terminus is at an interchange with U.S. Route 119 south of South Charleston, where the roadway continues northward as West Virginia Route 601.

WV 214 was formerly part of WV 14 (as was WV 114). Although it parallels US 119, it was never part of that route (which followed present WV 94 until Corridor G was built).

== Major intersections ==
County	Location	mi	km	Destinations	Notes
Lincoln	Yawkey			WV 3	
Lincoln	Priestley			To US 119 (via CR 119/1) – Charleston, Logan	
Kanawha				CR 214/10 (Childress Road) to US 119	
Kanawha	Ruth			US 119	
Kanawha	Charleston			US 119	
Kanawha	Charleston			US 119 / WV 601 north – Logan, Charleston	interchange
1.000 mi = 1.609 km; 1.000 km = 0.621 mi
