= West Virginia Route 601 =

State highway in West Virginia, United States

West Virginia Route 601

Route information
- Maintained by WVDOH
- Length: 2.3 mi (3.7 km)

Major junctions
- South end: US 119 / WV 214 near South Charleston
- North end: US 60 in South Charleston

Location
- Country: United States
- State: West Virginia
- Counties: Kanawha

Highway system
- West Virginia State Highway System; Interstate; US; State
← WV 598	→ WV 612

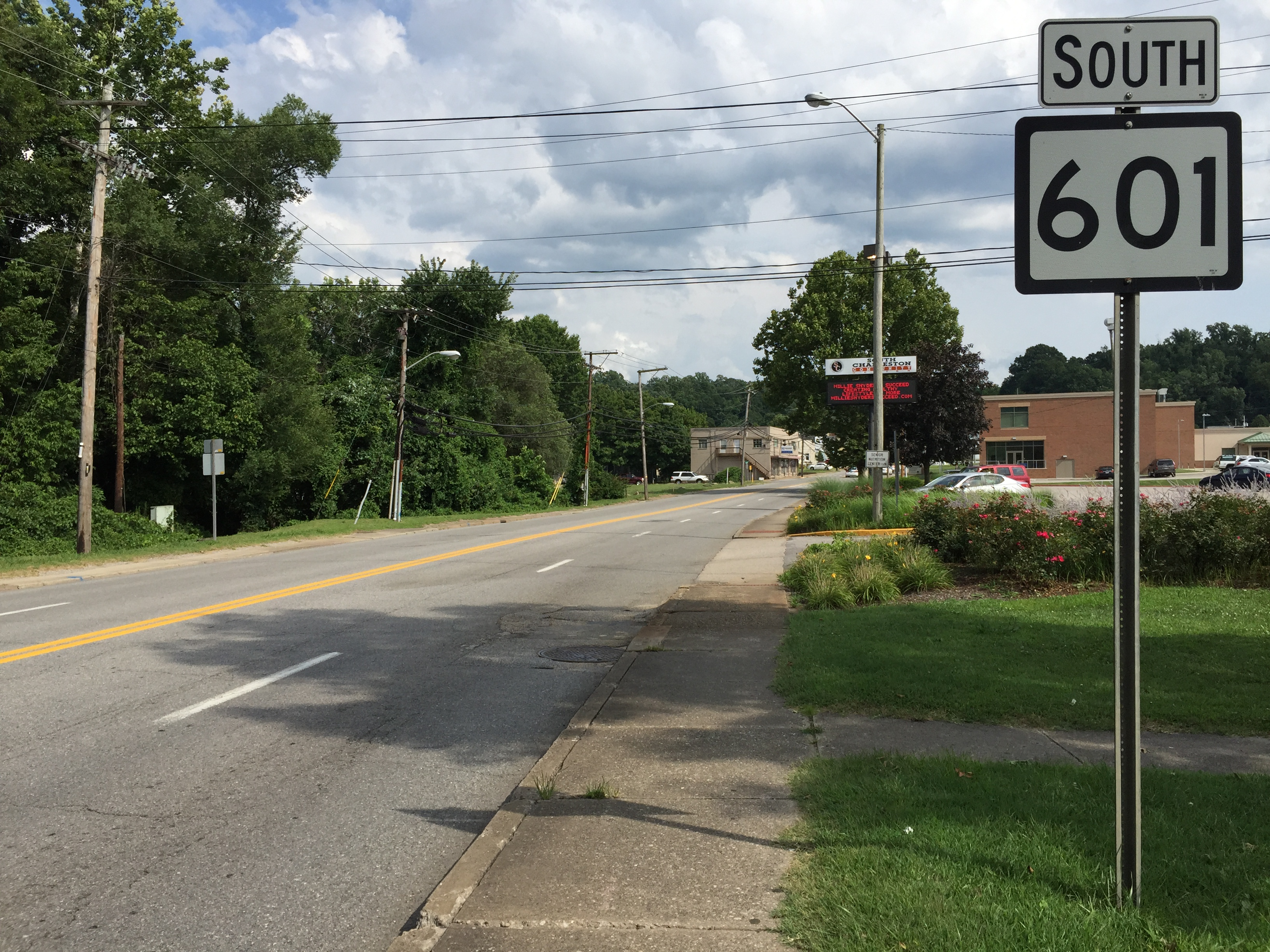
View south along WV 601 at US 60 in South Charleston

West Virginia Route 601 is a north–south state highway in the South Charleston, West Virginia area. The southern terminus of the route is at an interchange with U.S. Route 119 south of South Charleston, where the roadway continues as West Virginia Route 214. The northern terminus is at U.S. Route 60 in South Charleston near Interstate 64.

== Major intersections ==
The entire route is in Kanawha County.

Location	mi	km	Destinations	Notes
Charleston			US 119 / WV 214 south – Charleston, Logan	interchange
South Charleston			To I-64 east / Kanawha Turnpike east	
South Charleston			Kanawha Turnpike west	
South Charleston			US 60 (MacCorkle Avenue) to I-64	
1.000 mi = 1.609 km; 1.000 km = 0.621 mi
