= Magic Mart =

Ammar's Inc.
- Trade name: Magic Mart
- Type: Private
- Industry: Department Store
- Founded: 1920
- Defunct: September 2, 2018
- Headquarters: Bluefield, Virginia, U.S.
- Number of locations: 16
- Products: Clothing, Jewelry, Hardware, Lawn & Garden, Automotive, Sporting Goods, Toys, Furniture, Small Appliances, Hobby, Board Games, Electronics, Home Furnishings, Pet Supplies and Limited Grocery
- Website: Archived official website at the Wayback Machine (archive index)

Magic Mart was a chain of department/discount stores headquartered in Bluefield, Virginia. The chain was owned by Ammar's Inc., a private family-owned company.

Magic Mart had stores in Eastern Kentucky, Northeastern Tennessee, Southwest Virginia, Western and Central North Carolina, Arkansas, and southern and western West Virginia.

Magic mart carried a variety of items including electronics, toys, home improvement items etc.

== Company history ==
Magic Mart was founded by the Syrian Ammar family. In 1920, the Ammar brothers opened Ammar Brothers' Department Store in Williamson, West Virginia. In 1967, the Ammars opened the first Magic Mart in Grundy, Virginia. Magic Mart became more successful and more numerous. The Ammar Brothers' Department Stores all closed by 1974.

In 1991, Magic Mart began to experiment with larger store size by expanding the Oceana, West Virginia store from 35,000 to 80,000 square feet. The largest store was in Lenoir, North Carolina at 110,000 square feet before it closed in August 2013.

On July 2, 2018, Ammar's announced that difficult economic conditions and slow sales forced the closure of the company. Liquidation began around July 15, 2018, with all Magic Mart stores closed around September 1, 2018.

== Locations ==
Magic Mart has ceased all operations.

Magic Mart formerly operated at least 24 stores in five states, though only 16 were still operating in 2018 when all stores were closed. Two locations were added to the list for more complete accuracy; citation being that contributor worked there:

- Arkansas
  - Pine Bluff
- North Carolina
  - Lexington
  - Salisbury
- Virginia
  - Abingdon
  - Covington
  - Dryden
  - Bluefield
  - Galax
  - Grundy
  - North Tazewell
  - Norton
  - Pulaski
  - Richlands
  - Big Stone Gap
  - Lebanon, Va
- West Virginia
  - Beckley
  - Belle
  - Danville
  - Fairlea
  - Hinton
  - Oceana
  - Rainelle
  - Rockview
  - Teays Valley
  - Welch
- Kentucky
  - Hazard
  - Harlan
  - Pikeville
  - South Williamson
- Tennessee
  - Elizabethton
