= Wilson Creek Bridge =

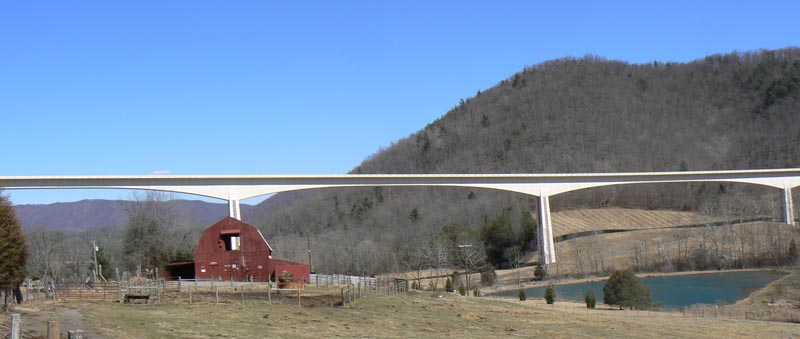
- Wilson Creek Bridge, looking northeast
- Coordinates: 37°10′26.004″N 80°22′29.388″W
- Carries: Virginia Smart Road
- Crosses: Wilson Creek, a tributary of the North Fork of the Roanoke River; County Route 723 (Ellett Road), part of U.S. Bicycle Route 76 and the TransAmerica Bicycle Trail
- Locale: Montgomery County, Virginia
- Maintained by: Virginia Tech Transportation Institute

Characteristics
- Design: Cast-in-place cantilever box girder
- Total length: 1,985 feet (605 m)
- Width: 40 feet (12 m), 2 lanes
- Longest span: 472 feet (144 m)
- Clearance below: 175 feet (53 m)

History
- Opened: May 30, 2001

Location
- Interactive map of Wilson Creek Bridge

The Wilson Creek Bridge (also known as the Smart Road Bridge) is a cast-in-place cantilever box girder bridge located in Montgomery County, Virginia, built as part of the Virginia Smart Road project. It extends for 1,985 feet (605 m) with three spans of 472 feet (144 m) and two spans of 283 feet (86 m). At 175 feet (53 m) tall, it is the second tallest bridge in Virginia, with the tallest being the Grassy Creek Bridge in Buchanan County at 225 feet (69 m) tall.

== Construction ==
Construction began in August 1998. The bridge was designed by Florida-based Figg Engineering Group and built by PCL Civil Constructors Inc., a subsidiary of PCL Constructors Inc. at a cost of US$17.4 million. The bridge design is the same genre as the Natchez Trace Parkway Bridge. The bridge is composed of four double-tapered piers with stone inlay, two conventional abutments, and 100 cast-in-place segments. After review of the bridge design by the construction firm, the segments were changed from 4.5 m to 5 m segments, deleting 35 segments from the critical path of construction. The bridge was completed on May 30, 2001.

The cast-in-place structure consists of 9,647 cubic yards (7,376 m^{3}) of concrete, 1,565,321 pounds (710,018 kg) of reinforcing steel, and 780,900 pounds (354,210 kg) of steel cables.

== Awards ==
In 2002, the bridge received an honorable mention in the Federal Highway Administration's Excellence in Highway Design Awards, Category 3A: Major Highway Structures Over $10 Million. The bridge also received an award that year from the Concrete Reinforced Steel Institute, the only 2002 award-winner east of the Mississippi River.

== Unique Features ==
The cast-in-place cantilever box girder bridge design is the only one of its kind in Virginia.

The bridge is hollow. Beneath the riding surface, the box girders are open with a width of 18 feet (5 m) and a height which varies from 12 feet (4 m) to 35 feet (11 m). Power and communication lines are carried in the hollow concrete box and run the length of the bridge. Manholes in the bridge deck allow researchers to enter the box to monitor testing equipment.

The support structure of the bridge is inlaid with Hokie Stone to blend in with the environment and meld with the architectural stylings of Virginia Tech.

== Bridge Pictures ==
- Early construction
- During construction
- During construction
- Below main spans during construction
- Construction nearing completion
- Looking south
- Aerial looking southeast
- Looking east across Ellett Valley and Wilson Creek
- Looking northeast
- Looking northwest

== See also ==
- List of bridges in the United States by height
