= South Charleston, West Virginia =

City in West Virginia, US

- City
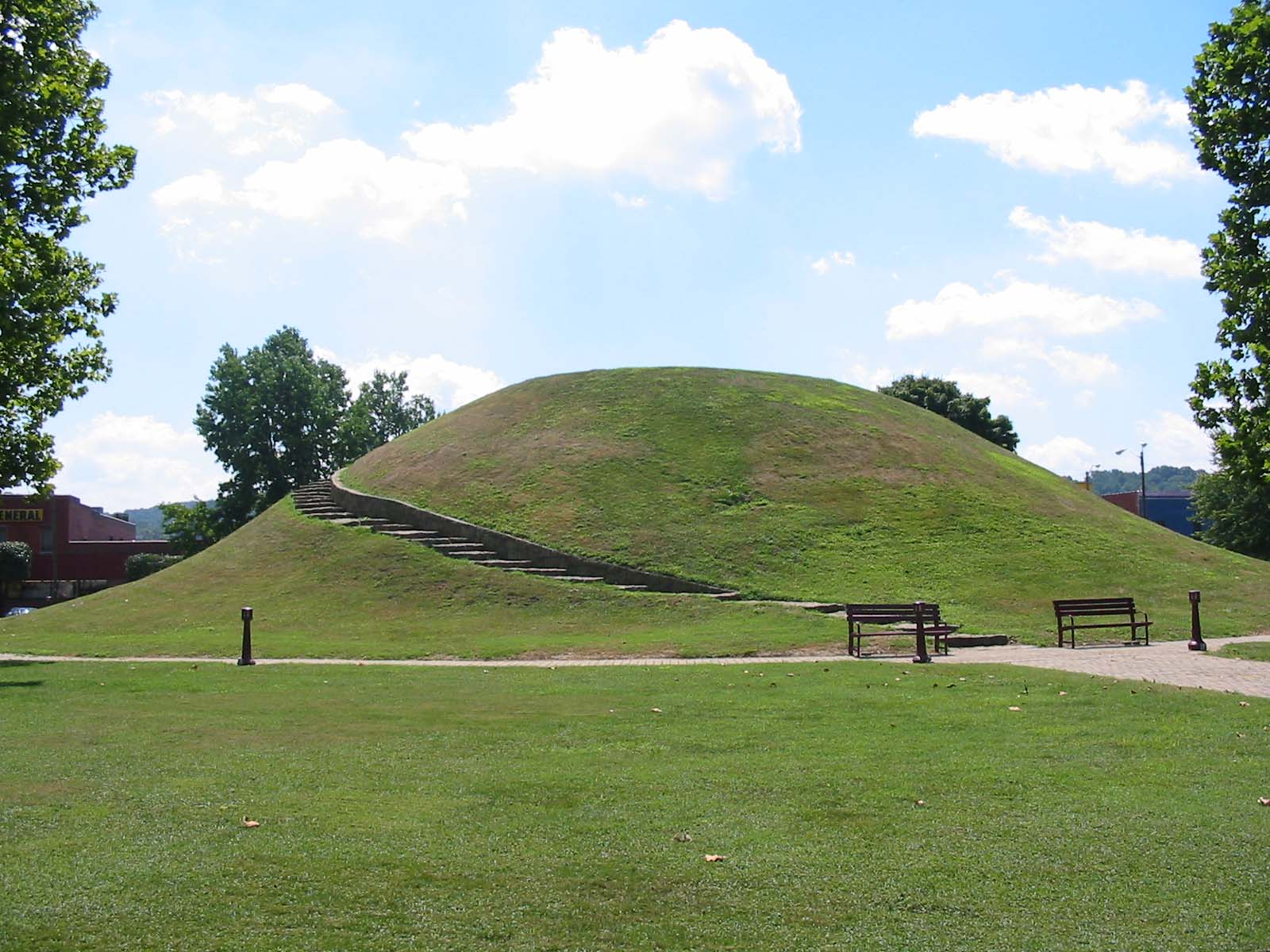
- Criel Mound

- Flag Seal

- Location of South Charleston in Kanawha County, West Virginia.
- Coordinates: 38°21′9″N 81°42′43″W
- Country: United States
- State: West Virginia
- County: Kanawha
- Established: 1906
- Incorporated: 1919

Government
  - Mayor: Frank A. Mullens, Jr. (R)

Area
  - City: 9.53 sq mi (24.69 km^{2})
  - Land: 8.64 sq mi (22.38 km^{2})
  - Water: 0.89 sq mi (2.31 km^{2})
- Elevation: 600 ft (183 m)

Population (2020)
  - City: 13,647
  - Estimate (2021): 13,352
  - Density: 1,394.0/sq mi (538.22/km^{2})
  - Urban: 153,199 (US: 214th)
  - Metro: 222,878 (US: 198th)
- Time zone: UTC-5 (EST)
  - Summer (DST): UTC-4 (EDT)
- ZIP codes: 25303, 25309
- Area code: 304
- FIPS code: 54-75292
- GNIS feature ID: 1555663
- Website: cityofsouthcharleston.com

South Charleston is a city in Kanawha County, West Virginia, United States. It is located to the west of the state capital of Charleston. The population was 13,639 at the 2020 census. It was established in 1906, but not incorporated until 1917. The Criel Mound built by the Adena culture is adjacent to the city's downtown business district.

It is home to the Charleston Ordnance Center, a former naval munitions factory established for use in World War I.

The city is served by Interstate 64, U.S. Route 60, U.S. Route 119, West Virginia Route 601 and West Virginia Route 214, and is adjacent to the Kanawha River. The city is served by the Kanawha Valley Regional Transportation Authority bus system. A general aviation airfield, Mallory Airport, is located off Chestnut Street, approximately two miles south of U.S. Route 60, with the nearest commercial aviation service being at Yeager Airport in Charleston. South Charleston serves as the headquarters of the West Virginia Division of Natural Resources and the West Virginia State Police.

== History ==
South Charleston was established in 1906, but not incorporated until 1919.

Leonidas Henrie Oakes Sr. (1843–1894) was a member of the West Virginia State Legislature. His son, Leonidas Henrie Oakes Jr. (1873–1949) was the mayor of South Charleston for many years. He was mayor from 1920 to 1921 and also from 1930 to 1946. He acquired funds to build the Thomas Memorial Hospital and also the Oakes Field in South Charleston. He was instrumental in developing recreational activities for the youth of the city.

It is home to the Charleston Ordnance Center, a former naval munitions factory established for use in World War I. It employed over 11,000 workers and produced 130,000 gun barrels for U.S. warships.

== Geography ==
South Charleston is located at 38°21′9″N 81°42′43″W (38.352455, −81.712001). Despite what its name might suggest, the city is located slightly north of the center of its eastern neighbor Charleston, but it lies on the south bank of the Kanawha River, while Charleston is on the river's north bank.

According to the United States Census Bureau, the city has a total area of 8.51 square miles (22.04 km^{2}), of which 7.61 square miles (19.71 km^{2}) is land and 0.90 square miles (2.33 km^{2}) is water.

=== Climate ===
The climate in this area is characterized by hot, humid summers and generally mild to cool winters. According to the Köppen Climate Classification system, South Charleston has a humid subtropical climate, abbreviated "Cfa" on climate maps.

== Demographics ==
Historical population
Census	Pop.	Note	%±
1920	3,650		—
1930	5,904		61.8%
1940	10,377		75.8%
1950	16,686		60.8%
1960	19,180		14.9%
1970	16,333		−14.8%
1980	15,968		−2.2%
1990	13,645		−14.5%
2000	13,390		−1.9%
2010	13,450		0.4%
2020	13,647		1.5%
2021 (est.)	13,352		−2.2%
U.S. Decennial Census

The median income for a household in the city was $37,905, and the median income for a family was $50,528. Males had a median income of $39,036 versus $25,978 for females. The per capita income for the city was $24,928. About 9.7% of families and 12.1% of the population were below the poverty line, including 19.4% of those under age 18 and 9.8% of those age 65 or over.

=== 2020 census ===
As of the 2020 census, South Charleston had a population of 13,647. The median age was 42.6 years. 20.6% of residents were under the age of 18 and 21.7% of residents were 65 years of age or older. For every 100 females there were 87.4 males, and for every 100 females age 18 and over there were 82.1 males age 18 and over.

95.3% of residents lived in urban areas, while 4.7% lived in rural areas.

There were 6,363 households in South Charleston, of which 26.1% had children under the age of 18 living in them. Of all households, 36.5% were married-couple households, 19.1% were households with a male householder and no spouse or partner present, and 36.7% were households with a female householder and no spouse or partner present. About 37.4% of all households were made up of individuals and 17.3% had someone living alone who was 65 years of age or older.

There were 7,145 housing units, of which 10.9% were vacant. The homeowner vacancy rate was 2.6% and the rental vacancy rate was 11.4%.

Racial composition as of the 2020 census
Race	Number	Percent
White	11,420	83.7%
Black or African American	1,134	8.3%
American Indian and Alaska Native	32	0.2%
Asian	169	1.2%
Native Hawaiian and Other Pacific Islander	7	0.1%
Some other race	121	0.9%
Two or more races	764	5.6%
Hispanic or Latino (of any race)	252	1.8%

=== 2010 census ===
As of the census of 2010, there were 13,450 people, 6,283 households, and 3,675 families residing in the city. The population density was 1,767.4 inhabitants per square mile (682.4/km^{2}). There were 6,819 housing units at an average density of 896.1 per square mile (346.0/km^{2}). The racial makeup of the city was 86.9% White, 8.4% African American, 0.3% Native American, 1.1% Asian, 0.3% from other races, and 3.0% from two or more races. Hispanic or Latino of any race were 1.0% of the population.

There were 6,283 households, of which 26.1% had children under the age of 18 living with them, 39.6% were married couples living together, 15.5% had a female householder with no husband present, 3.4% had a male householder with no wife present, and 41.5% were non-families. 36.0% of all households were made up of individuals, and 13.4% had someone living alone who was 65 years of age or older. The average household size was 2.14 and the average family size was 2.77.

The median age in the city was 42.3 years. 20.9% of residents were under the age of 18; 6.5% were between the ages of 18 and 24; 25.7% were from 25 to 44; 29.5% were from 45 to 64; and 17.6% were 65 years of age or older. The gender makeup of the city was 45.7% male and 54.3% female.

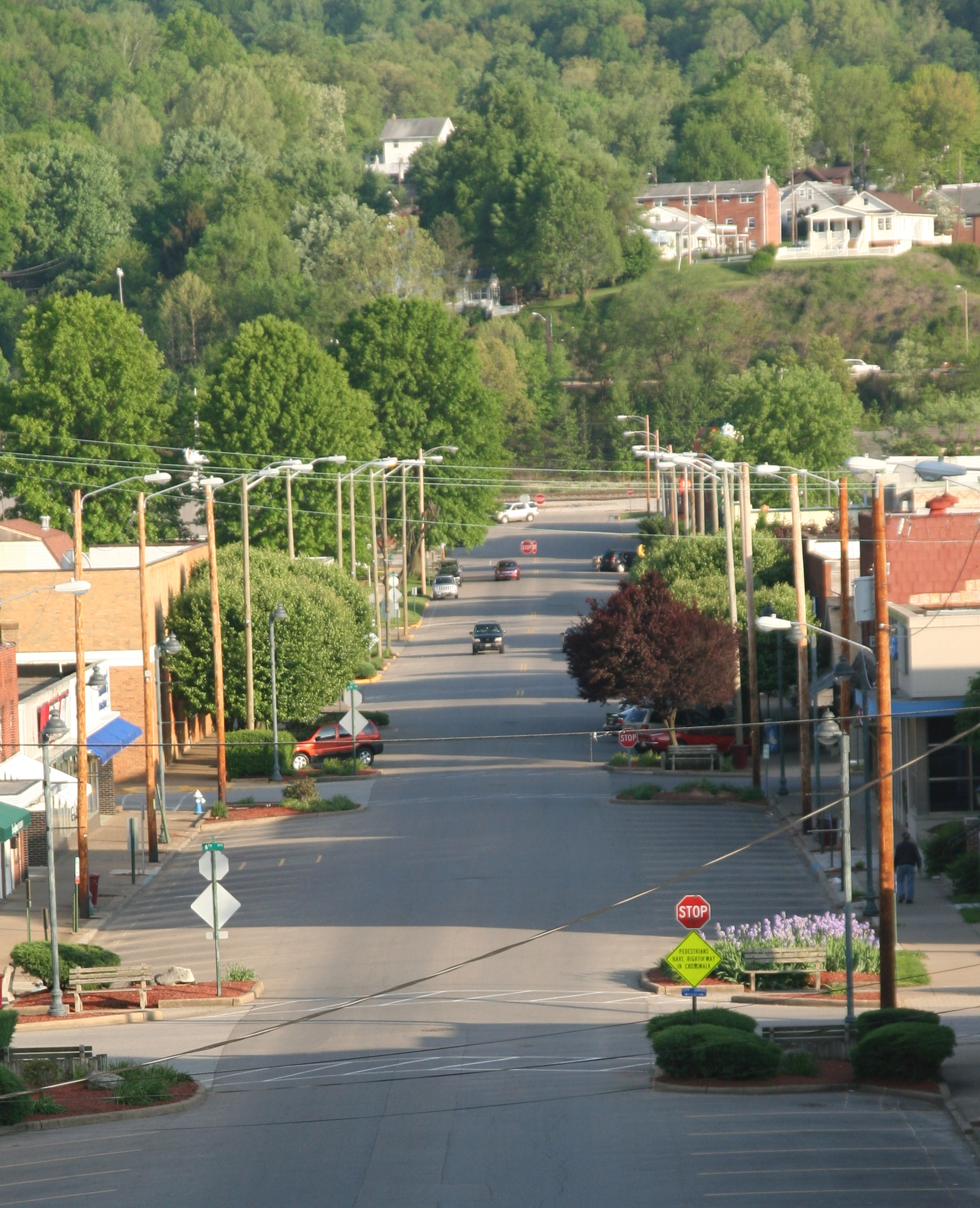
D Street

== Economy ==
In South Charleston are the headquarters of International Industries, the parent company of a group of subsidiaries founded in 1947 by James H. "Buck" Harless, based primarily in natural resources such as coal and timber, but which also include the manufacturing, hotel and real estate industries.

== Education ==
There are six elementary schools in South Charleston: Montrose Elementary, Ruthlawn Elementary, Richmond Elementary, Alum Creek Elementary, Bridgeview Elementary, and Weberwood Elementary. The main middle school is South Charleston Middle School (SCMS), which is located on 3rd Ave. SCMS houses grades 6–8. South Charleston High School (SCHS) is one of eight high schools in Kanawha County Schools. SCHS is located on Eagle Way and houses grades 9–12. There are also two colleges located in the city. A South Charleston campus for BridgeValley Community and Technical College is located at the former Dow Chemical research facility and the Marshall University – South Charleston Campus is a branch of Marshall University.

== Arts and culture ==
South Charleston attractions include Criel Mound (also known as the South Charleston Adena Burial Mound), and the South Charleston Museum. The South Charleston Museum is located in the historic LaBelle Theater on D Street, and features a West Virginia Film Series, Open Mic Night, exhibitions, and other events.

The city is also home to a community center, an ice arena, Little Creek Park, Little Creek Country Club and Joplin Park. The Interpretive Center is located at 313 D street and features the Appalachian trail, the Mound, Indian artifacts, arrowheads, chemical history and artifacts, and a Belgium display depicting the first business in South Charleston.

== Notable people ==
- Tom Good former NFL player
- Carl Lee, former NFL player, was also born and raised in South Charleston
- Kathy Mattea, Country singer-songwriter, was born in the city's Thomas Memorial Hospital to parents who lived in nearby Cross Lanes, where she grew up
- Herbert J. Thomas Jr., Thomas Memorial Hospital is namesake, a World War II Medal of Honor recipient who was raised in South Charleston
- Breece D'J Pancake, short-story writer, was born in South Charleston
- Alex Hawkins, SCHS graduate, NFL player and broadcaster, "Captain Who" author
- T.D. Jakes, televangelist
- Larry Combs, musician, inducted into the Music Hall of Fame, Chicago symphony SCHS class of 1957

== See also ==
- Rock Lake Pool (1942–1985)
