= Rock Lake Pool =

Outdoor swimming pool in South Charleston, West Virginia

Coordinates: 38°21′1″N 81°44′29″W

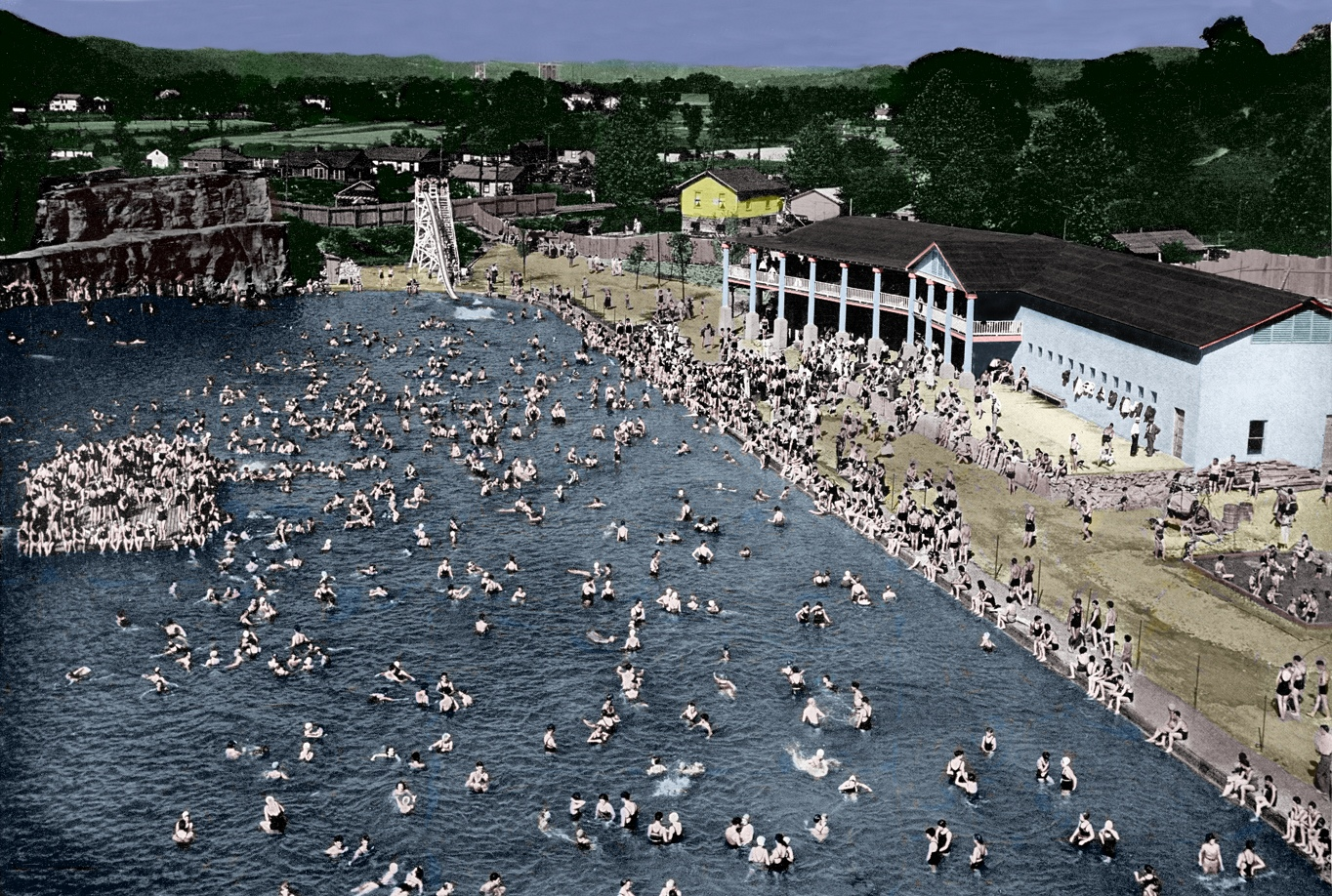
- An aerial view of Rock Lake Pool from June 6, 1949
- Interactive map of Rock Lake Pool
- Location: South Charleston, West Virginia United States
- Owner: Joe, David, and Sam Wilan
- Operator: Joe, David, and Sam Wilan
- Dimensions: Length: 500 ft.

Construction
- Opened: 1942
- Closed: 1985

Rock Lake Pool was an outdoor swimming pool located in South Charleston, West Virginia operating from 1942 to 1985. Being 550 feet (170 m) long, it was billed as "the largest and most beautiful pool in the East". The pool was built in an old rock quarry in the 1930s and opened by Joe, David, and Sam Wilan in 1942. The pool was enclosed by tall natural rock walls that provided high dives. The pool was very popular in both West Virginia and neighboring states and on one occasion, even drew a crowd of around 4,000 swimmers in one day. After a long decline, the historic pool eventually closed in 1985 due to increased insurance cost and competition from other pools. The site is now owned by Rock Lake Presbyterian Church.

The pool was surrounded by rock walls which were used as natural high dives. It also included things such as a 50-foot slide, water trampoline, spraying fountain, trapeze and miniature churning sternwheel.

The Wilan brothers, who owned the pool, forbade blacks from swimming there. During the 1960s, West Virginian civil rights leader Bernard Hawkins led protests against the segregated Rock Lake Pool.

Soon after its initial closing, Rock Lake Pool re-opened as Rock Lake Golf and Games. The old pool house had been transformed into a restaurant and indoor arcade. The front entrance and parking lot had been changed into a go-cart track. In the rock quarry where the old pool was located, it was partially filled in to build a mini golf course. In the remaining swimming pool area, a sectioned off area allowed for bumper boats. Rock Lake Golf and Games eventually closed in 2006.

The area was purchased by the Rock Lake Presbyterian Church in 2006 for $440,000. In 2008, The remainder of the pool was filled in to create a playground. The final demise of the pool brought a variety of emotions from residents who remembered it either with memories of fun days playing there or as a place they were denied access to.
