= Ermine, Kentucky =

Unincorporated community in Kentucky, United States

- Unincorporated community
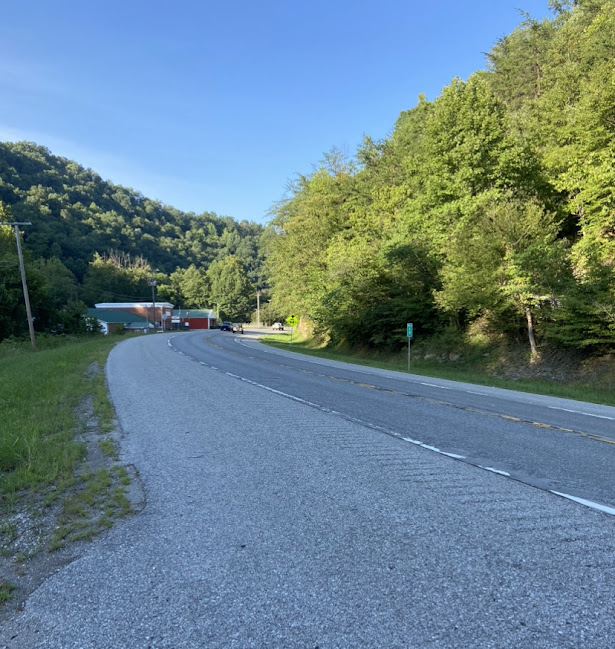
- U.S. Route 119 in Ermine

- Location within Kentucky Location within the United States
- Coordinates: 37.160523°N 82.798881°W
- Country: United States
- State: Kentucky
- County: Letcher

Area
  - Total: 5.32242 sq mi (13.7850 km^{2})
  - Land: 5.32242 sq mi (13.7850 km^{2})
  - Water: 0 sq mi (0 km^{2})
- Elevation: 1,240 ft (378 m)

Population (2000)
  - Total: 662
  - Density: 14/sq mi (5.5/km^{2})
- Time zone: UTC-5 (Eastern (EST))
  - Summer (DST): UTC-4 (EDT)
- ZIP code: 41815
- Area code: 606
- GNIS feature ID: 491809

Ermine is an unincorporated community in Letcher County, Kentucky, United States. Its ZIP Code is 41815.

A post office was established in the community in 1904. The origins of the place name Ermine are unclear: it might have named for the first postmaster Ermine Webb, resident Ermine Hall, or resident Ermine Craft. Letcher County Central High School was established in the area in 2005.
