= Hamilton Farm Petroglyphs =

- U.S. National Register of Historic Places
- Location within West Virginia Location within the United States
- Location: U.S. Route 119 southeast of Ringgold, in Monongalia County, West Virginia
- Coordinates: 39°33′48″N 79°56′36″W
- Area: 0.2 acres (0.081 ha)
- Built by: Native Americans
- Architectural style: Petroglyphs
- NRHP reference No.: 74002015
- Added to NRHP: August 7, 1974

Hamilton Farm Petroglyphs, also known as Pictured Rocks and Indian Picture Rocks, are a series of ancient petroglyphs located on U.S. Route 119 southeast of Ringgold, in Monongalia County of northern West Virginia. The rock art designs were carved by early Native Americans on sandstone.

The Hamilton Farm Petroglyphs and surrounding archaeological site were listed on the National Register of Historic Places in 1974.

Designs

There were 25 designs cataloged, when they were inspected in 1961. These included: bear tracks, deer tracks, human footprints, a snail or spiral, human figures with upraised arms, and a "Spirit Otter." They are within an 18-foot square section of the stone, at an elevation of 1,460 feet.

== See also ==
- Prehistory of West Virginia
