= Burnwell, West Virginia =

Unincorporated community in West Virginia, United States

- Unincorporated community
- Location within West Virginia Location within the United States
- Coordinates: 38°03′09″N 81°22′31″W
- Country: United States
- State: West Virginia
- County: Kanawha
- Elevation: 889 ft (271 m)
- Time zone: UTC-5 (Eastern (EST))
  - Summer (DST): UTC-4 (EDT)
- Area codes: 304 & 681
- GNIS feature ID: 1536771

Burnwell is an unincorporated community in Kanawha County, West Virginia, United States. Burnwell is 10.5 miles (16.9 km) east-northeast of Sylvester.

The community originally was a coal-mining community, hence the name Burnwell.
