= Lovely, Kentucky =

Unincorporated community in Kentucky, United States

- Unincorporated community
- Location within Kentucky Location within the United States
- Coordinates: 37°49′33″N 82°24′5″W
- Country: United States
- State: Kentucky
- County: Martin
- Elevation: 627 ft (191 m)
- Time zone: UTC-5 (Eastern (EST))
  - Summer (DST): UTC-4 (EDT)
- ZIP codes: 41231
- GNIS feature ID: 497220

Lovely is an unincorporated community located in Martin County, Kentucky, United States.

== History ==
A post office called Lovely has been in operation since 1931. Lovely was the name of the town's merchant, Samuel Dorsey Lovely. A folk etymology maintains the community was so named on account of the "lovely" scenery of the original town site.

== Education ==
Lovely has a lending library, a branch of the Martin County Public Library.
