= Sidney, Kentucky =

Unincorporated community in Kentucky, United States

- Unincorporated community
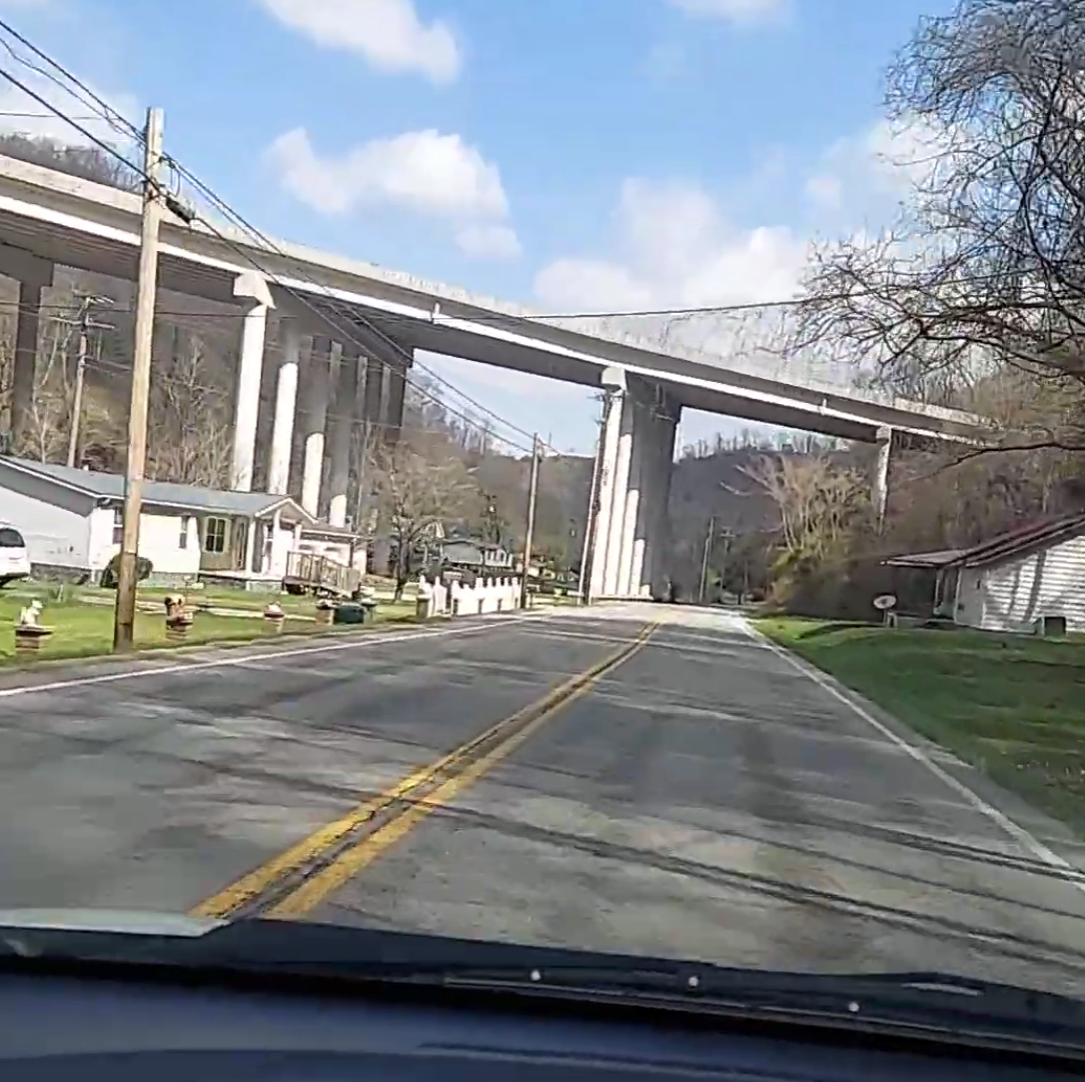
- US 119's overpass over Bent Mountain Road in Sidney

- Location of Sidney in Kentucky
- Coordinates: 37°37′12″N 82°21′24″W
- Country: United States
- State: Kentucky
- County: Pike
- Elevation: 748 ft (228 m)
  - Density: 53/sq mi (20/km^{2})
- Time zone: UTC-5 (Eastern (EST))
  - Summer (DST): UTC-4 (EDT)
- ZIP code: 41564
- Area code: 606
- FIPS code: 21-21195
- GNIS feature ID: 509056

Sidney is an unincorporated community in Pike County, Kentucky, United States, nestled at the intersection of KY 486 and KY 3220. Although Sidney is unincorporated, it has its own volunteer fire department (Big Creek Fire Department). There are also several coal mining operations that are still in use.

Country Singer-Songwriter Stephen Cochran is from this area.
