= Greasy Creek, Kentucky =

Unincorporated community in Kentucky, United States

Greasy Creek
- Unincorporated community
- Location within the state of Kentucky Greasy Creek (the United States)
- Coordinates: 37°22′34″N 82°28′33″W
- Country: United States
- State: Kentucky
- County: Pike
- Elevation: 896 ft (273 m)
- Time zone: UTC-6 (Central (CST))
  - Summer (DST): UTC-5 (est)
- GNIS feature ID: 493229

Greasy Creek is an unincorporated community and coal town in Pike County, Kentucky, United States.
