= Goody, Kentucky =

Unincorporated community in Kentucky, United States

Goody
- Unincorporated community
- Location within the state of Kentucky Goody (the United States)
- Coordinates: 37°39′43″N 82°16′11″W
- Country: United States
- State: Kentucky
- County: Pike
- Elevation: 679 ft (207 m)
- Time zone: UTC-5 (Eastern (EST))
  - Summer (DST): UTC-4 (EDT)
- ZIP codes: 41529
- GNIS feature ID: 492987

Goody is an unincorporated community in Pike County, Kentucky, United States. Its post office closed in August 1996. Goody is now a part of the South Williamson CDP.

The origin of the name "Goody" is obscure and unknown.
