= Rockhouse, Kentucky =

Unincorporated community in Kentucky, United States

Rockhouse
- Unincorporated community
- Location within the state of Kentucky Rockhouse (the United States)
- Coordinates: 37°19′37″N 82°27′9″W
- Country: United States
- State: Kentucky
- County: Pike
- Elevation: 1,014 ft (309 m)
- Time zone: UTC-6 (eastern (est))
  - Summer (DST): UTC-5 (EST)
- ZIP codes: 41561
- GNIS feature ID: 502167

Rockhouse is an unincorporated community and coal town in Pike County, Kentucky, United States.
