= Lookout, Kentucky =

Unincorporated community in Kentucky, United States

Lookout
- Unincorporated community
- Location within the state of Kentucky Lookout (the United States)
- Coordinates: 37°18′48″N 82°28′1″W
- Country: United States
- State: Kentucky
- County: Pike
- Elevation: 1,007 ft (307 m)
- Time zone: UTC-6 (Central (CST))
  - Summer (DST): UTC-5 (CST)
- ZIP codes: 41542
- GNIS feature ID: 497161

Lookout is an unincorporated community and coal town located in Pike County, Kentucky, United States. It was also known as the Marrowbone Coal Mine. Its post office closed in January 2011.
