= Wolfpit, Kentucky =

Unincorporated community in Kentucky, United States

Wolfpit
- Unincorporated community
- Location within the state of Kentucky Wolfpit (the United States)
- Coordinates: 37°21′10″N 82°25′23″W
- Country: United States
- State: Kentucky
- County: Pike
- Elevation: 735 ft (224 m)
- Time zone: UTC-6 (Central (CST))
  - Summer (DST): UTC-5 (CST)
- GNIS feature ID: 507070

Wolfpit is an unincorporated community and coal town in Pike County, Kentucky, United States.
