= Nolan, West Virginia =

- Unincorporated community
- Location within West Virginia Location within the United States
- Coordinates: 37°44′23″N 82°19′53″W
- Country: United States
- State: West Virginia
- County: Mingo
- Elevation: 650 ft (200 m)
- Time zone: UTC-5 (Eastern (EST))
  - Summer (DST): UTC-4 (EDT)
- Area codes: 304 & 681
- GNIS feature ID: 1544188

Nolan is an unincorporated community in Mingo County, West Virginia, United States. Nolan is located on the Tug Fork along U.S. Routes 52 and 119, 5.5 miles (8.9 km) northwest of Williamson.

The community, now considered a street community within Williamson, was devasted by the Tug Fork flooding of 1977.
