= South Williamson, Kentucky =

Census-designated place in Kentucky, United States

- Unincorporated community Census-designated place
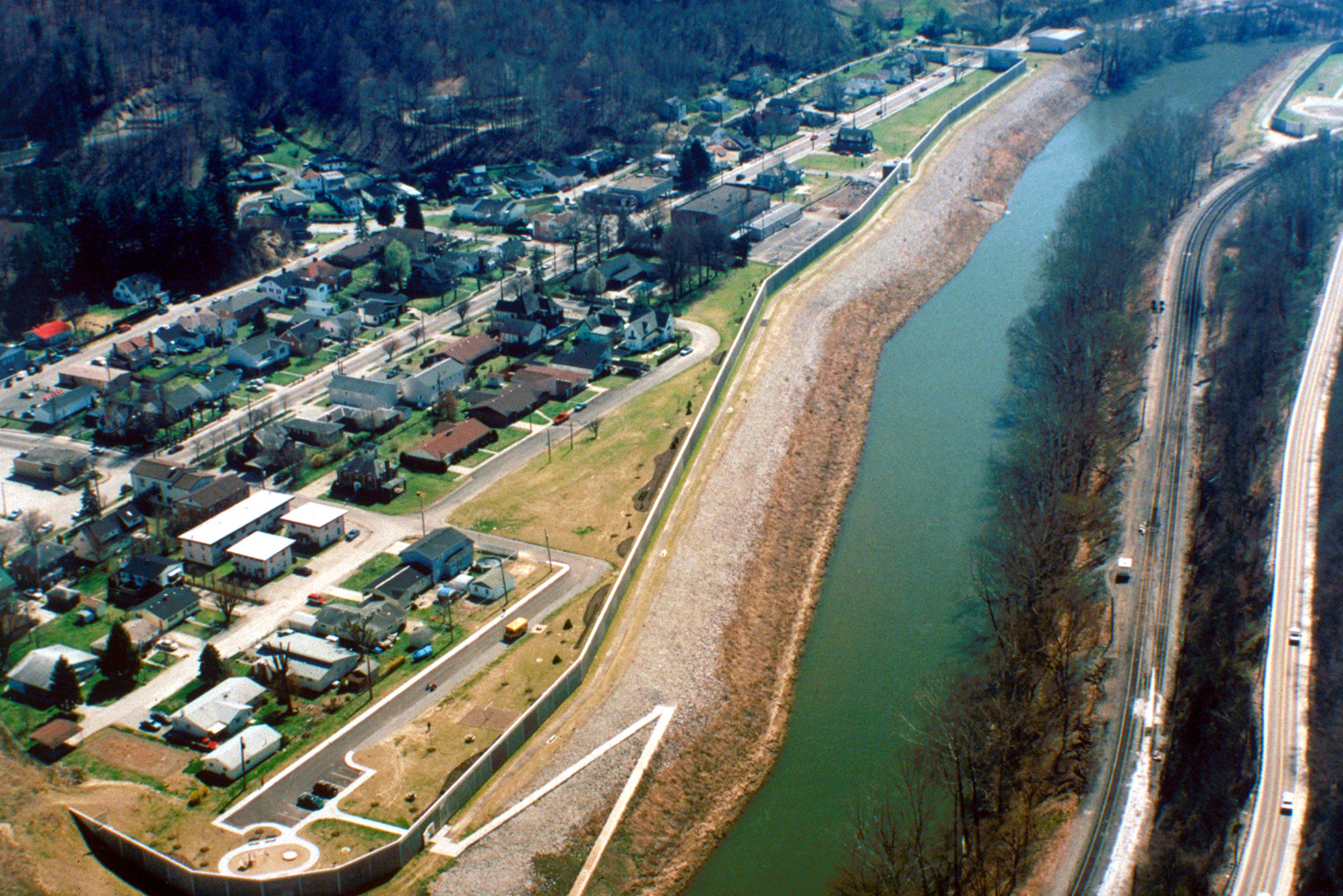
- The town is protected by a floodwall along the Tug Fork River

- Location in Pike County and the state of Kentucky.
- Coordinates: 37°40′19″N 82°17′03″W
- Country: United States
- State: Kentucky
- County: Pike

Area
  - Total: 1.97 sq mi (5.11 km^{2})
  - Land: 1.97 sq mi (5.11 km^{2})
  - Water: 0 sq mi (0.00 km^{2})
- Elevation: 705 ft (215 m)

Population (2020)
  - Total: 562
  - Density: 284.7/sq mi (109.92/km^{2})
- Zip codes: 41503, 41514 & 41527
- Area code: 606
- FIPS code: 21-72264
- GNIS feature ID: 2629682

South Williamson is an unincorporated community in the Appalachian Mountains of northeastern Pike County, Kentucky, United States, on the border with West Virginia. It is separated from Williamson, West Virginia by the Tug Fork River. The community is located near U.S. Route 119 about 23 miles (37 km) east of Pikeville, Kentucky and 28 miles (45 km) southwest of Logan, West Virginia.

For statistical purposes, the United States Census Bureau has defined that community as a census-designated place (CDP). As of the 2020 census, South Williamson had a population of 562. The South Williamson area includes the surrounding Kentucky communities of Goody, Forest Hills, Toler, and Belfry. In 1990s, residents of the area voted down a proposal to incorporate the area. Another incorporation attempt was proposed in 2015, and the name Johnsonville was proposed for the new incorporated town.

The local economy is largely fueled by coal mining, transportation, health care, and retail. Southside Mall is located in South Williamson.

== History ==
In the late 19th century, Pike County and bordering Mingo County, West Virginia provided the setting for the Hatfield-McCoy feud, a bitter feud waged between two feuding families between 1878 and 1891 that has become American history.

=== Flooding ===
South Williamson is protected by a floodwall, built by the US Army Corps of Engineers in response to a devastating flood along the Tug Fork River in 1977. There have only been three uses of the gates thus far; the first occurred in 2002 during a major flood in the region, the second in 2003, due to anticipation of the rising river getting higher, and the third occurring in 2025 when another major flood struck the town causing the Tug Fork to crest at levels not seen since the 1984 flood. Areas just outside of the floodwall in South Williamson were devastated by river water rushing into homes and businesses in and around the South Williamson area. The area's regional hospital, ARH Regional Medical Center was 4 feet shy of being devastated by the flood due to water getting dangerously close to overtopping the floodwall around the hospital.

== Healthcare ==
South Williamson is the location of Appalachian Regional Healthcare's Tug Valley Regional Medical Center.

== Schools ==
- Belfry Elementary
- Belfry Middle
- Belfry High School
