= Yeager, Kentucky =

Unincorporated community in Kentucky, United States

Yeager
- Unincorporated community
- Location within the state of Kentucky Yeager (the United States)
- Coordinates: 37°23′30″N 82°31′18″W
- Country: United States
- State: Kentucky
- County: Pike
- Elevation: 755 ft (230 m)
- Time zone: UTC-6 (Eastern (EST))
  - Summer (DST): UTC-5 (EST)
- GNIS feature ID: 507202

Yeager is an unincorporated community and coal town in Pike County, Kentucky, United States.
