= Virginia Smart Road =

Testing road in Virginia, USA

Route information
- Maintained by Virginia Department of Transportation
- Length: 2.2 mi (3.5 km) future length 5.7 mi (9.2 km)
- Existed: March 2000 (phase one)–present

Major junctions
- West end: Western turnaround loop at Transportation Research Drive
- East end: Eastern turnaround loop near Wilson Creek Bridge

Location
- Country: United States
- State: Virginia
- Counties: Montgomery County, Virginia

Highway system
- Virginia Routes; Interstate; US; Primary; Secondary; Byways; History; HOT lanes

The Virginia Smart Road, also known as simply the Smart Road or Smart Highway, is a short, limited-access road in Montgomery County, Virginia, used for the testing of pavement technologies and as a proving ground for new transportation technologies. The road is not open to the public. The Smart Road is currently a 2.2-mile (3.5 km) stretch of road with turn-around loops at either end. Eventually, the road will be extended to a total of 5.7 miles (9.2 km), directly connecting U.S. Route 460 in Blacksburg to Interstate 81 with an interchange near mile marker 121; however, there is yet to be a set time frame for completion. The Wilson Creek Bridge was built for the Smart Road and, at 175 feet (53 m) tall, is the second tallest bridge in Virginia. The road and bridge are operated and maintained by the Virginia Department of Transportation. It is part of the proposed Interstate 73 Corridor.

== Features ==
Smart Road features and operations include, but are not limited to:

- A 2.2-mile, controlled-access test track built to interstate standards
- Two paved lanes
- Three bridges, including the Smart Road Bridge (the second tallest state-maintained bridge in Virginia)
- Full-time staff that coordinate all road activities
- 24/7 access control and oversight
- Centralized communications
- Lighting and weather system controls
- Safety assurance and surveillance
- Fourteen pavement sections, including an open-grade friction course
- In-pavement sensors (e.g., moisture, temperature, strain, vibration, weigh-in-motion)
- Zero-crown pavement section designed for flooded pavement testing
- An American Association of State Highway and Transportation Officials (AASHTO)-designated surface friction testing facility
- Seventy-five weather-making towers accessible on crowned and zero-crown pavement sections
- Artificial snow production of up to four inches per hour (based on suitable weather conditions)
- Production of differing intensities of rain with varying droplet sizes
- Fog production
- Two weather stations with official National Oceanic and Atmospheric Administration (NOAA) weather available within one mile
- Variable pole spacing designed to replicate 95 percent of national highway systems
- Multiple luminaire heads, including light-emitting diode (LED) modules
- A wireless mesh network variable control (i.e., luminaire dimming)
- A high-bandwidth fiber network
- A differential GPS base station
- Complete signal phase and timing (SPaT) using remote controls
- Wide shoulders for safe maneuvering during experimental testing

== Segments ==
Phase	Project	Completion
1	1.78 mi (2.86 km) two-lane testbed with western end turnaround	March 2000
2	2,000 ft (610 m) Wilson Creek Bridge and eastern end turnaround	May 2001
3	3.7 mi (6.0 km) extension to I-81 at mile marker 121	TBA
Future	Widening entire 5.7 mi (9.2 km) roadway to four lanes	TBA

In 1994, VDOT unveiled two alternate routes for the Smart Road partially to avoid smooth purple coneflower populations in Ellett Valley.
