= Ashcamp, Kentucky =

Unincorporated community in Kentucky, United States

Ashcamp
- Unincorporated community
- Location within the state of Kentucky Ashcamp (the United States)
- Coordinates: 37°15′58″N 82°26′6″W
- Country: United States
- State: Kentucky
- County: Pike
- Elevation: 1,079 ft (329 m)
- Time zone: UTC-5 (EDT)
  - Summer (DST): UTC-5 (EDT)
- ZIP codes: 41512
- Area code: 606
- GNIS feature ID: 486080

Ashcamp is an unincorporated community and coal town in Pike County, Kentucky, United States.
