= Breaks, Virginia =

Unincorporated community in Virginia, United States

- Census-designated place
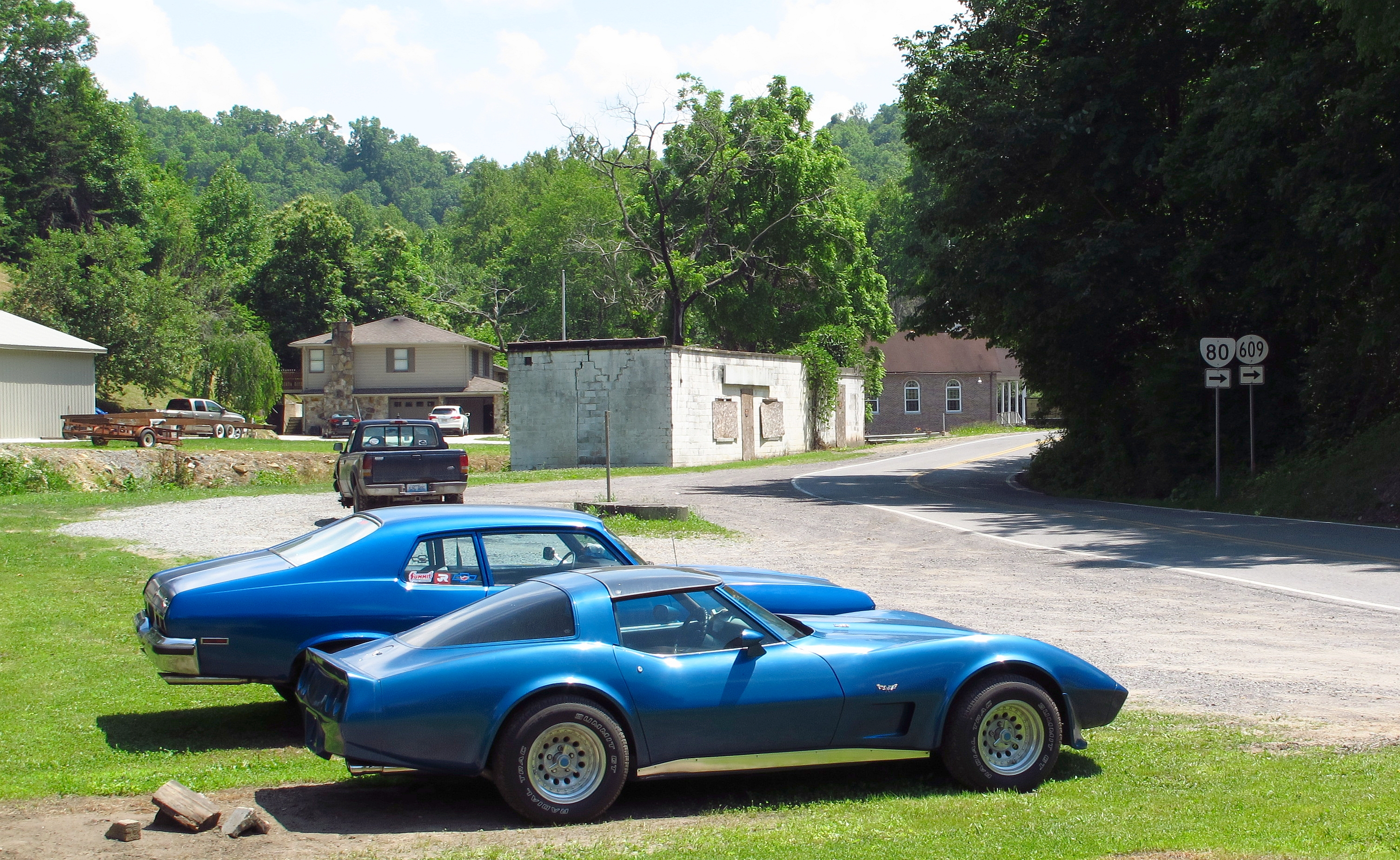
- Breaks

- Location within Virginia Location within the United States
- Coordinates: 37°17′45″N 82°16′52″W
- Country: United States
- State: Virginia
- Counties: Buchanan; Dickenson
- Elevation: 1,476 ft (450 m)

Population (2020)
  - Total: 144
- Time zone: UTC−5 (Eastern (EST))
  - Summer (DST): UTC−4 (EDT)
- FIPS code: 51-09400
- GNIS feature ID: 1494190

Breaks is a small unincorporated community and census-designated place (CDP) located mostly in Buchanan County, Virginia, United States. A small portion of the CDP is in Dickenson County. Breaks is located very close to the Kentucky border and is east of Breaks Interstate Park. Breaks gets its name in reference to the "break" in Pine Mountain, a mountain range that spans the Kentucky-Virginia border and ends near the community of Breaks. It was first listed as a CDP in the 2020 census with a population of 144.

It was in Breaks that U.S. Senator George Allen referred to S. R. Sidarth, an Indian-American volunteer for the Jim Webb campaign, using the slur "macaca". The incident created a controversy that gained national attention.

== Demographics ==
Breaks has a population of 377 people who are all white with 64.1% who are married, 34% married with children and 18.9% have children but are single.

== Attractions ==
- Breaks Interstate Park
- Russell Fork, a popular whitewater rafting stream
- Willowbrook Country Club, a nine-hole golf course

== Demographics ==
Breaks first appeared as a census designated place in the 2020 U.S. census.
