= Burnwell, Kentucky =

Unincorporated community in Kentucky, United States

Burnwell
- Unincorporated community
- Location within the state of Kentucky Burnwell (the United States)
- Coordinates: 37°37′44″N 82°13′23″W
- Country: United States
- State: Kentucky
- County: Pike
- Elevation: 709 ft (216 m)
- Time zone: UTC-5 (Eastern (EST))
  - Summer (DST): UTC-4 (EDT)
- ZIP codes: 41518
- GNIS feature ID: 507626

Burnwell is an unincorporated community located in Pike County, Kentucky, United States.

== Burnwell meteorite ==
On 4 September 1990, at 3:45 PM, a meteorite fell through the porch of Arthur and Frances Pegg frightening a horse and a goat. The weight of the stone was 1504 grams and it was officially named "Burnwell". The meteorite was classified as an ordinary chondrite H4-an.
