= Marrowbone, Pike County, Kentucky =

Unincorporated community in Kentucky, United States

Marrowbone
- Unincorporated community
- Location within the state of Kentucky Marrowbone (the United States)
- Coordinates: 37°21′57″N 82°24′50″W
- Country: United States
- State: Kentucky
- County: Pike
- Elevation: 755 ft (230 m)
- Time zone: UTC-5 (Eastern (EST))
  - Summer (DST): UTC-4 (EDT)
- ZIP codes: 41559
- GNIS feature ID: 517534

Marrowbone is an unincorporated community located in Pike County, Kentucky, United States. It was also known as Regina.
