= U.S. Route 119 =

Highway in the United States

U.S. Route 119
- US 119 highlighted in red

Route information
- Auxiliary route of US 19
- Length: 585 mi (941 km)
- Existed: November 11, 1926–present

Major junctions
- South end: US 25E in Pineville, KY
- US 23 / US 460 in Pikeville, KY; I-64 / I-77 in Charleston, WV; US 33 from Spencer, WV, to Buckhannon, WV; I-79 near Weston, WV; US 50 in Grafton, WV; I-68 at Morgantown, WV; US 40 in Uniontown, PA; I-70 / I-76 in New Stanton, PA; US 30 in Greensburg, PA; US 22 near Blairsville, PA
- North end: US 219 in Sandy Township, PA

Location
- Country: United States
- States: Kentucky, West Virginia, Pennsylvania

Highway system
- United States Numbered Highway System; List; Special; Divided
← KY 118	KY	→ KY 120
← WV 115	WV	→ US 121
← PA 118	PA	→ PA 120

U.S. Route 119 (US 119) is a spur of US 19. It is a north–south route (on a northeast–southwest alignment) that was an original United States highway of 1926. It is Corridor G of the Appalachian Development Highway System (ADHS) east of US 23 and KY 80 in Kentucky to Interstate 64 at Charleston, West Virginia. It is the longest road in West Virginia, traveling a distance of 279 miles (449 km) through the state.

== Route description ==
=== Kentucky ===
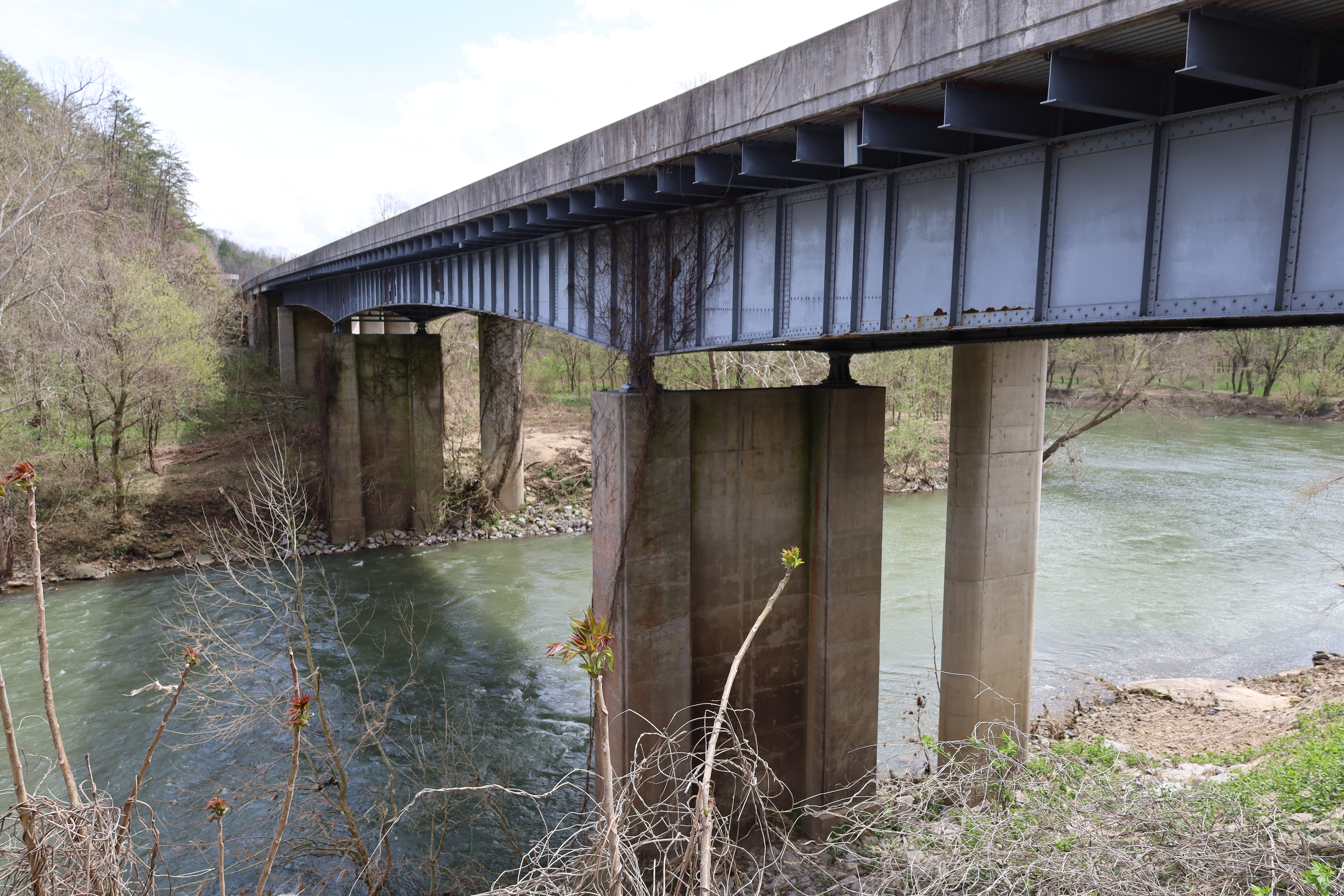
U.S. Route 119 crossing the Cumberland River at its southern terminus in 2025

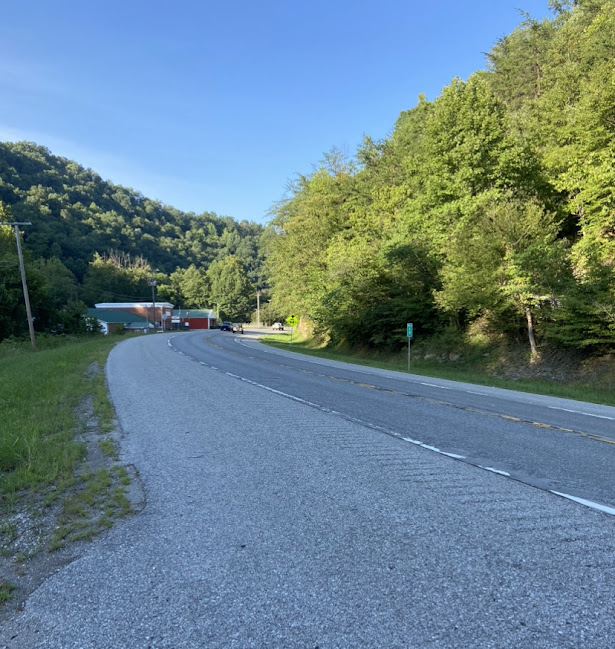
US 119 at Ermine, east of the city of Whitesburg, Kentucky

In Kentucky, US 119 is a two- and four-lane highway running from Pineville at U.S. Route 25E to the West Virginia state line at South Williamson. It follows the Cumberland River past Harlan to near the source of the river's Poor Fork, crosses Pine Mountain south of Whitesburg, then follows a meandering course along the mountain to Jenkins, where it joins US 23 and turns north to Pikeville. Just north of Pikeville it turns east to South Williamson, where it crosses the Tug Fork of the Big Sandy River into Williamson, West Virginia.

=== West Virginia ===
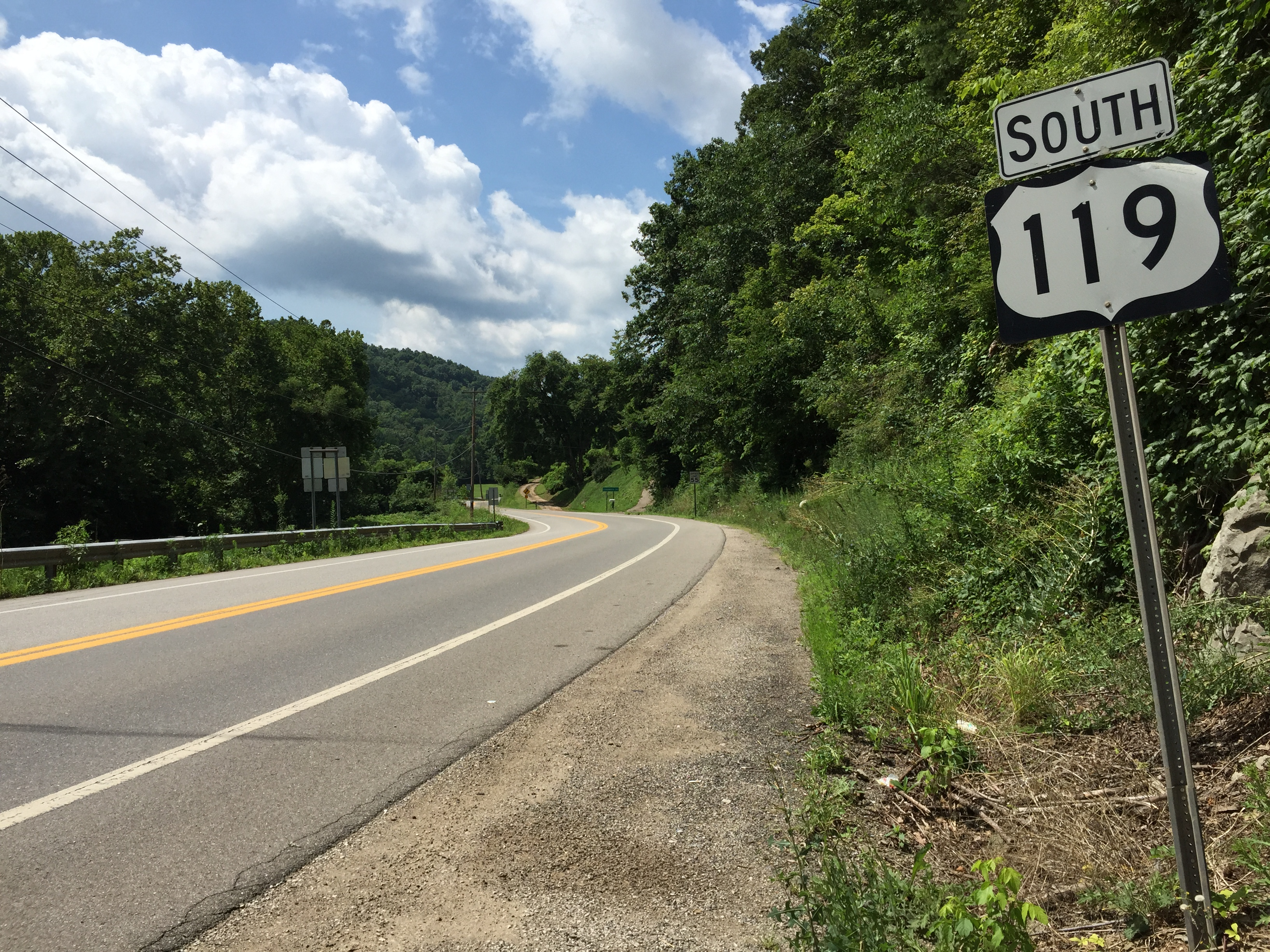
View south along US 119 at WV 36 near Spencer, West Virginia

From Pikeville to US 23 (Country Music Highway) at Jenkins, it is part of ADHS Corridor F. In its concurrency from Jenkins north to Pikeville, where it heads east toward West Virginia, it is part of Corridor B. From US 23/KY 80 at Pikeville eastward towards the state line, it is part of Corridor G.

U.S. Route 119 enters West Virginia from Kentucky as unsigned ADHS Corridor G, a four-lane limited-access highway stretching from Williamson to Charleston. The earliest segment of Corridor G to open was in 1972 and was finished in 1997. Formerly, US 119 was a typical two-lane mountain highway. Old US 119 now comprises all or parts of US 52, WV 44, WV 10, WV 17, WV 85, WV 3, WV 94 and WV 61.

The US route becomes a mostly two-lane highway north of Charleston, having functionally been replaced by Interstate 79. Compared to its replacement, US 119 takes a rather winding course. A trip from the Charleston area to the Morgantown area (I-79/US 119 Exit #1 to I-68 Exit #1) is 147 miles (237 km) via I-79 and 182 miles (293 km) via US 119. The travel time is about double taking US 119, over 4 hours instead of about 2 hours.

From Charleston, US 119 heads roughly east along the Elk River to Clendenin, where it turns north for 29 miles (47 km) to Spencer. At Spencer, it begins to head east with US 33 for 81.4 miles (131.0 km). Along the way, it passes through Glenville and Weston, where it intersects parent route US 19 and replacement I-79. From I-79 to WV 20 at Buckhannon, US 33/US 119 follow Corridor H.

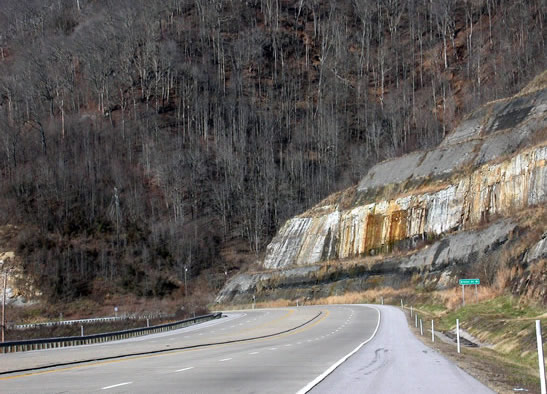
US 119 and US 52 north of Williamson.

At Buckhannon, US 119 again turns north — first with WV 20 then by itself as it travels to Philippi. At Philippi it joins with US 250 for 12 miles (19 km). From there, US 119 heads on its own through Grafton and towards Morgantown.

Just south of Morgantown, US 119 intersects Interstate 68's Exit #1, immediately east of its end at I-79. US 119 then enters downtown Morgantown, again meeting with US 19. It leaves town via the narrow and winding North Willey Street and congested Mileground.

I-68 Exit #7, which effectively allows through traffic to bypass Morgantown. US 119 finally turns north to enter Pennsylvania near Point Marion. The Hamilton Farm Petroglyphs are along this section. Much of this last stretch of US 119 heading towards Uniontown, Pennsylvania is already bypassed by traffic using I-68, CR 857, and PA 857 (or the tolled Mon-Fayette Expressway). While this alternate route is longer, it has a better alignment and is faster to travel.

=== Pennsylvania ===
US 119 travels through Connellsville, Greensburg, and Punxsutawney, and bypasses Uniontown and Indiana. There are numerous other boroughs and villages along its 133-mile (214 km) route in the Keystone State.

The southern entrance of US 119 is at the West Virginia state line one-half mile south of Point Marion. The northern terminus is at US 219 two miles (3 km) south of DuBois, Pennsylvania.

US 119's control cities include Morgantown, West Virginia, Uniontown, Connellsville, New Stanton (for northbound traffic only), Greensburg, Blairsville, Indiana, Punxsutawney, and DuBois.

== History ==
=== U.S. Route 123 ===
U.S. Route 123
- Location: Pineville, KY—Jenkins, KY
- Existed: 1930–1934

In 1929 U.S. Route 23, which then ended at Jenkins, KY, was extended to Pineville. The following year this section was renumbered to U.S. Route 123, to allow US 23 to be extended in a different direction (towards Kingsport TN). In 1934 US 119 was extended from Morgantown WV into Kentucky, joining US 123 at Jenkins; US 123 was then renumbered to US 119.

=== Kentucky ===
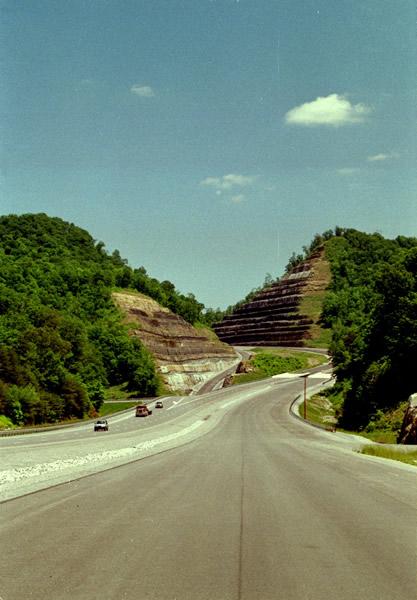
The Burning Fork interchange northeast of Pikeville, in 2005 when US 119 was under construction.

Hwy 119 in Kentucky was originally a series of two-lane roads paralleling Pine Mountain that connected Pineville to Baxter (just north of Harlan) and then headed northeast through Cumberland, Whitesburg, and Pikeville en route to West Virginia.

Starting in the 1970s, there were a number of projects that widened or replaced sections of the road. In most places, the original route has been largely abandoned, instead cutting through the mountain to provide a much wider and straighter route. Small segments of the original route are still in existence as access roads to communities that predate the expansion. In Loyall the original route is known as Hwy 413, and this parallels Hwy 119 heading northeast until it reaches the community of Rosspoint. During this stretch in Baxter, Hwy 119 also briefly combines with U.S. Route 421, which then splits off and heads north across Pine Mountain. In Rosspoint, the original route of Hwy 119 is designated as Hwy 522. Hwy 522 parallels Hwy 119 all the way to Cumberland, where the final stretch of original highway is called Kingdom Come Dr. before merging with Hwy 119 just south of the Harlan County/Letcher County border.

From this point until the base of Pine Mountain (unofficially called Whitesburg Mountain), the highway is largely unchanged from its original route. On the mountain, Hwy 119 has recently been widened in a number of places in order to make it safer for trucking traffic.

Across the mountain in Whitesburg, Hwy 119 turns northeast. South of Jenkins, Hwy 119 merges with U.S. Route 23 until Pikeville, where it splits off and heads northeast to the West Virginia border.

In 2007, a 6-mile stretch of Hwy 119 northeast of Pikeville, was expanded and improved by cutting through the mountain, once again abandoning the original route which is now known as the Zebulon Hwy. and Bent Branch Rd. Past this point, Hwy 119 follows its original route until exiting Kentucky at South Williamson.

=== West Virginia ===
The routing of US 119 south of Charleston changed drastically with the opening of Corridor G from 1972 to 1997.

The original routing southeast of the capital was WV 61 to Marmet, where it took WV 94 southwest to Racine. From Racine to Danville, it followed today's WV 3 and onward to Madison. From Madison south to Logan, it followed today's WV 17.

South of Logan to Mountain View, it followed WV 44. At Mountain View, it intersected US 52 and traveled concurrently with it to the northwest, to Williamson, where it entered Kentucky.

== Corridor G ==
Corridor G
- Location: Pikeville, KY – Charleston, WV
- Length: 105.1 mi (169.1 km)
- Existed: 1972–present

Corridor G is a highway in Kentucky and West Virginia. It is part of the Appalachian Development Highway System, encompassing US 119 for its length. At the southern terminus of Corridor G at Corridor B (US 23/US 460/KY 80) near Pikeville, Kentucky, traffic can continue along Corridor B towards Pikeville and Jenkins, where one can pick up Corridor F (US 119) or proceed south on Corridor B (US 23) into Virginia. At the northern terminus at Interstate 64 in Charleston, West Virginia, one can pick up Interstate 77 and Interstate 79, along with the West Virginia Turnpike.

The Hatfield–McCoy Trails are an ATV and mountain biking network of trails throughout southwest West Virginia. Three trail heads branch off from various secondary routes accessible from Corridor G.

Kentucky

In 1974, the first segment of Corridor G was completed from KY 292 (2nd St.) at South Williamson south to KY 199 at Huddy. This was a four-lane divided highway that contained mountable medians and jersey barriers, with a mix of state route and driveway access. This is especially evident as US 119 cuts through the center of Belfry and South Williamson. Several years later, a 2.5-mile (4.0 km) segment of four-lane US 119 along Buckley Creek opened from Corridor B/US 23/US 460/KY 80 north of Pikeville to what is now KY 1426 3.5 miles (5.6 km) northeast of Pikeville.

In 1997, a section of US 119 was relocated on a new alignment from KY 3154 (Meathouse Fork Rd.) at Canada east to KY 199 at Huddy. Two years later, a section of US 119 was relocated on a new alignment from 2.5 miles (4.0 km) east of Meta to KY 3154 at Canada. This involved extensive highwall construction at Bent Mountain and Canada Knob.

The final segment of Corridor G in Kentucky to be completed was from the KY 1426 intersection north of Pikeville east to Scott Fork 2.5 miles (4.0 km) east of Meta. This segment required the construction of three twin steel-box girder bridges at Johns Creek (KY 194) near Bevins Branch, Winn Branch (Winn Branch Road), and Raccoon Creek (KY 1441). This also includes a modified diamond interchange at what will be old US 119 1/2-mile east of KY 1426 at Zebulon.

On June 30, 2006, the "Pinson Family Bridge" was dedicated. It crosses Raccoon Creek and KY 1441. This twin steel-box girder bridge is more than 1,200 ft (370 m) long and is the only example of its kind in Kentucky. The girders were chosen because of the curvature within the bridge structure; each girder is completely hollow and it features a 10 ft (3.0 m). clearance on the interior.

On December 6, 2006, a segment of Corridor G opened from the KY 1426 intersection north of Pikeville east to the KY 194 (Johns Creek) interchange. The last segment to open is from KY 194 north to Scott Fork. That segment was opened in March 2008.

West Virginia

The first segment of Corridor G to open was in 1972. During that year, a Mingo County segment from Myrtle and Belo (MP 13) to the Logan County line near Holden opened. Segments of this were opened originally as a "super-two" since WV 65 was being destroyed; the old roadway needed to be removed before the highway was expanded to four lanes.

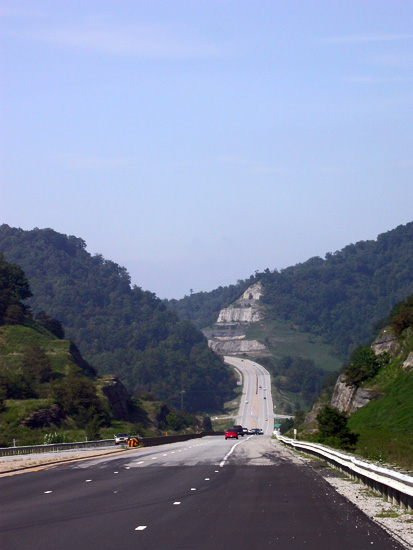
Corridor G north of Logan, West Virginia.

In 1973, a lengthy segment opened to traffic from Godby Heights south of Chapmanville (MP 13) to MP 4 in Boone County. This was followed a year later by a segment near Madison from MP 9.37 to MP 13 in Boone County. In 1975, the segment from MP 4 to MP 9.37 in Boone County was opened to traffic. At this time, the connection to Interstate 64 in Charleston also opened to traffic from Oakwood Road. This included the flyover ramp from US 119 to the Interstate 64 interchange.

In 1977, a Mingo County segment from Nolan (MP 7.45) at US 52 to Myrtle (MP 13) opened to traffic.

The next segment to open would come in 1982, when a Boone, Lincoln, and Kanawha County segment opened to traffic from Julian (MP 17) to the WV 601 interchange in South Charleston (MP 11). The segment between the WV 601 interchange and Oakwood Road in Charleston would be completed in 1986; it formerly utilized Oakhurst and Oakwood Roads.

In 1989, a segment from MP 13 to Julian (MP 17) in Boone County opened. In 1992, a new Tug Fork crossing at Williamson was completed. Formerly, Corridor G traffic from Kentucky had to cross into downtown Williamson and pick up US 119 into West Virginia.

The last segment of Corridor G in West Virginia to be completed was from the Tug Fork crossing at Williamson north to US 52 near Nolan. This nine-mile (14 km) segment was completed in 1997.

== Major intersections ==
Kentucky

- US 25E in Pineville
- US 421
- US 23 in Jenkins
- US 460 in Pikeville

West Virginia

- US 52

Kentucky
No major junctions
West Virginia
No major junctions
Kentucky
No major junctions
West Virginia

- I-64 in Charleston
- US 60 in Charleston
- I-79 in Mink Shoals
- US 33 in Spencer
- US 19 in Weston
- I-79 / US 48 south-southeast of Weston
- US 250 in Philippi
- US 50 in Grafton
- I-68 south of Morgantown
- US 19 in Morgantown

Pennsylvania

- US 40
- I-70 / I-76 in New Stanton
- US 30
- US 22 west of New Alexandria. The highways travel concurrently to east-northeast of Blairsville.
- US 422
- US 322
- US 219
