= Kentucky Route 199 =

State highway in Kentucky, United States

Kentucky Route 199
- KY 199 highlighted in red

Route information
- Maintained by KYTC
- Length: 11.5 mi (18.5 km)

Major junctions
- South end: KY 632 south of McVeigh
- KY 1056 near Pinsonfork
- North end: US 119 in Huddy

Location
- Country: United States
- State: Kentucky
- Counties: Pike

Highway system
- Kentucky State Highway System; Interstate; US; State; Parkways
← KY 198	→ KY 200

Kentucky Route 199 (KY 199) is a 11.5-mile-long (18.5 km) state highway in the U.S. state of Kentucky. The highway connects mostly rural areas of Pike County with Huddy.

== Route description ==
KY 199 begins at an intersection with KY 632 (Upper Johns Creek Road) south of McVeigh, within Pike County. Most of the southern end of the highway is a very curvy road, with many switchbacks. It travels in a fairly northerly direction, crossing over Pond Creek, and passing Grants Branch Park, before it enters McVeigh. There, the highway has a second and third crossing of Pond Creek. Northwest of McVeigh, it has a fourth crossing of the creek, then a crossing of Atkins Branch. It curves to the north-northeast and has two more crossings of Pond Creek in Pinsonfork. There, it also passes a U.S. Post Office. The highway curves to the north and intersects the western terminus of KY 1056. It curves to the northwest and crosses Pond Creek twice more. KY 199 begins curving to the north-northeast and crosses over Pinson Fork. It travels through McAndrews. It curves to the northwest and crosses Pond Creek again. KY 199 curves to the north-northwest and travels through Stone. The highway enters Huddy, where it crosses Pond Creek one final time and meets its northern terminus, an intersection with U.S. Route 119.

== Major intersections ==
The entire route is in Pike County.

Location	mi	km	Destinations	Notes
	0.0	0.0	KY 632 (Upper Johns Creek Road) – Kimper, Phelps	Southern terminus
Pinsonfork	8.2	13.2	KY 1056 east	Western terminus of KY 1056
Huddy	11.5	18.5	US 119 – Pikeville, Williamson	Northern terminus
1.000 mi = 1.609 km; 1.000 km = 0.621 mi
