= Kentucky Route 194 =

State highway in Kentucky, United States

Kentucky Route 194
- KY 194 highlighted in red

Route information
- Maintained by KYTC
- Length: 85.945 mi (138.315 km)

Major junctions
- West end: KY 1428 near Emma
- KY 1426 near Meta
- East end: SR 697 near Argo

Location
- Country: United States
- State: Kentucky
- Counties: Floyd, Pike

Highway system
- Kentucky State Highway System; Interstate; US; State; Parkways
← KY 193	→ KY 195

Kentucky Route 194 (KY 194) is an 85.945-mile-long (138.315 km) state highway in Kentucky that runs from Kentucky Route 1428 east of Emma to Virginia State Route 697 at the Virginia state line south of Argo via Woods, Kimper, Phyllis, Phelps, Freeburn, Majestic, and Stopover.

KY 194 is part of the Rural Secondary System from KY 1428 to the intersection with Sycamore Road at the Mountain Public Links golf course (between McCombs and Mayflover), and the State Secondary System the rest of the way to Virginia.

== Major intersections ==
County	Location	mi	km	Destinations	Notes
Floyd		0.000	0.000	KY 1428	Western terminus
Floyd		5.417	8.718	KY 3385 south (Jervis Branch Road)	Northern terminus of KY 3385
Pike		21.463	34.541	KY 2061 south (Caney Creek Road)	Northern terminus of KY 2061
Pike		23.834	38.357	KY 3227 west (Joes Creek)	Eastern terminus of KY 3227
Pike		29.008	46.684	KY 1426 west (Zebulon Highway)	West end of KY 1426 overlap
Pike		29.979	48.247	KY 1426 east (Meta Highway)	East end of KY 1426 overlap
Pike		30.210	48.618	KY 2169 north (Johns Creek Road)	Southern terminus of KY 2169
Pike		30.8	49.6	To US 119 – Pikeville, South Williamson	
Pike	Kimper	39.796	64.045	KY 632 east (Upper Johns Creek Road)	Western terminus of KY 632
Pike		42.307	68.087	KY 3418 north (Ridge Line Road)	Southern terminus of KY 3418
Pike		52.729	84.859	KY 1499 south (North Levisa Road)	Northern terminus of KY 1499
Pike		54.281	87.357	KY 1758 north (Long Fork Road)	Southern terminus of KY 1758
Pike		57.342	92.283	KY 3419 east (Smith Fork Road)	Western terminus of KY 3419
Pike		66.992	107.813	KY 2062 east (Widows Branch)	Western terminus of KY 2062
Pike	Phelps	68.368	110.028	KY 632 west	Eastern terminus of KY 632
Pike	Freeburn	73.597	118.443	KY 194 Spur east	Western terminus of KY 194 Spur
Pike		77.612	124.904	KY 2059 south (Chiefs Way)	Northern terminus of KY 2059
Pike		80.412	129.411	KY 2062 west (Widows Branch)	Eastern terminus of KY 2062
Pike		82.330	132.497	KY 2059 north (Chiefs Way)	Southern terminus of KY 2059
Pike		85.945	138.315	SR 697 south	Eastern terminus; Kentucky-Virginia state line
1.000 mi = 1.609 km; 1.000 km = 0.621 mi: Concurrency terminus

== Freeburn spur ==
Kentucky Route 194 Spur
- Location: Freeburn
- Length: 0.066 mi (106 m)

Kentucky Route 194 Spur (KY 194 Spur) is a 0.066-mile-long (0.106 km) spur route of KY 194 that connects to West Virginia State Route 49 at the West Virginia state line in Freeburn.

=== Major intersections ===
The entire route is in Freeburn, Pike County.

mi	km	Destinations	Notes
0.000	0.000	KY 194	Western terminus
0.066	0.106	WV 49 north	Eastern terminus; Kentucky-West Virginia state line
1.000 mi = 1.609 km; 1.000 km = 0.621 mi
