= Pike County Schools (Kentucky) =

School district in Kentucky, United States

Address
- 316 South Mayo Trail Pikeville, Kentucky, 41501; United States

District information
- Type: Public
- Motto: "Focus On The Students"
- Grades: Pre-K through 12
- Superintendent: Dr. Reed Adkins

Students and staff
- Students: 10,457 (2008)
- Teachers: 745 (2008)
- Student–teacher ratio: 15.1 (2008)

Other information
- Website: pike.kyschools.us

Pike County Schools is a public school district located in Pike County, Kentucky. The district has 10,457 students (as of 2008) attending 25 schools, making it the eighth largest school district in Kentucky. It serves the entire county except for the city of Pikeville, which has a separate district of its own. Although some of the schools operated by the Pike County district have a Pikeville mailing address, none of them are within the Pikeville city limits.

== Board of education ==
The five members of the Pike County Board of Education are elected by general election to four-year terms. Each board member is responsible for an area of Pike County and the schools contained therein. The current board members are: Chairman Justin Maynard, Vice Chairman Kenneth "C.B." Biliter, Ireland "Heavy" Blankenship, and Nee Jackson. The District 3 board seat was vacated in October 2015 by Frank Ratliff. The seat has not yet been filled. Reed Adkins currently serves as superintendent.

== History ==
Reed Adkins was superintendent until 2024, and Freddie Bowling replaced him in that role.

== List of schools ==
Pike County Public Schools
School	City	Mascot	Enrollment	Grades
Belfry High School	Belfry	Pirates	648	9-12
East Ridge High School	Lick Creek	Warriors	750	9-12
Phelps High School	Phelps	Hornets	408	9-12
Pike County Central High School	Pikeville	Hawks	714	9-12
Shelby Valley High School	Pikeville	Wildcats	598	9-12
Belfry Middle	Belfry	Pirates	558	6-8
Belfry Elementary	Belfry	Pirates	683	PK-5
Bevins Elementary	Sidney	Cardinals	198	PK-5
Dorton Elementary	Dorton	Wildcats	320	PK-8
Elkhorn City Elementary	Elkhorn City	Cougars	497	PK-8
Feds Creek Elementary	Feds Creek	Vikings	275	PK-8
Johns Creek Elementary	Pikeville	Bearcats	797	PK-8
Kimper Elementary	Kimper	Cubs	185	PK-8
Milliard School	Pikeville	Mustangs	859	PK-8
Mullins School	Pikeville	Tigers	492	PK-8
Northpoint Academy	Pikeville		100	9-12
Phelps Day Treatment	Phelps		25	6-12
Phelps Elementary	Kimper	Hornets	299	PK-8
Shelby Valley Day Treatment	Pikeville		27	6-12
Valley Elementary	Pikeville	Wildcats	953	PK-8
