= Kentucky Route 632 =

U.S. Highway Route

Kentucky Route 632
- KY 632 highlighted in red

Route information
- Maintained by KYTC
- Length: 14.019 mi (22.561 km)

Major junctions
- West end: KY 194 at Kimper
- North end: KY 194 in Phelps

Location
- Country: United States
- State: Kentucky
- Counties: Pike

Highway system
- Kentucky State Highway System; Interstate; US; State; Parkways
← KY 631	→ KY 633

Kentucky Route 632 (KY 632) is a 14.019-mile-long (22.561 km) state highway in Pike County, Kentucky, that runs from Kentucky Route 194 at Kimper to KY 194 again in Phelps.

== Major intersections ==
The entire route is in Pike County.

Location	mi	km	Destinations	Notes
Kimper	0.000	0.000	KY 194	Western terminus
	4.034	6.492	KY 1758 south (Long Fork Road)	Northern terminus of KY 1758
	6.737	10.842	KY 199 north (Dinky Road)	Southern terminus of KY 199
	10.459	16.832	KY 3419 west (Smith Fork Road)	West end of KY 3419 overlap
	11.389	18.329	KY 3419 east (Calloway Branch-Seng Camp Road)	East end of KY 3419 overlap
Phelps	14.019	22.561	KY 194	Eastern terminus
1.000 mi = 1.609 km; 1.000 km = 0.621 mi: Concurrency terminus
