= New Alma Coal Camp, Kentucky =

Unincorporated community in Kentucky, United States

New Alma Coal Camp
- Unincorporated community
- Location within the state of Kentucky New Alma Coal Camp (the United States)
- Coordinates: 37°36′3″N 82°9′55″W
- Country: United States
- State: Kentucky
- County: Pike
- Elevation: 696 ft (212 m)
- Time zone: UTC-6 (Central (CST))
  - Summer (DST): UTC-5 (CST)
- GNIS feature ID: 2336943

New Alma Coal Camp was an unincorporated community and coal town located in Pike County, Kentucky, United States.
