= Mouthcard, Kentucky =

Unincorporated community in Kentucky, United States

Mouthcard
- Unincorporated community
- Location within the state of Kentucky Mouthcard (the United States)
- Coordinates: 37°22′56″N 82°15′21″W
- Country: United States
- State: Kentucky
- County: Pike
- Elevation: 850 ft (260 m)
- Time zone: UTC-5 (Eastern (EST))
  - Summer (DST): UTC-5 (EST)
- ZIP codes: 41548
- GNIS feature ID: 2336930

Mouthcard is a small unincorporated community in Pike County, Kentucky, United States near the Virginia state line. It lies on the Levisa Fork River of the Big Sandy River in the heart of the Appalachians. U.S. Route 460 runs through Mouthcard to meet U.S. Route 23 in Pikeville, the county seat.

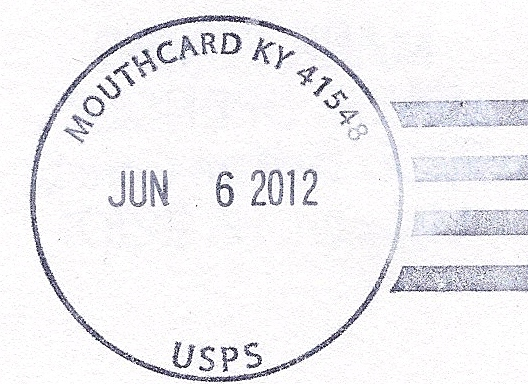

== Geography ==
Mouthcard sits at the mouth of two creeks: Big Card Creek, and Little Card Creek. Card Mountain is nearby. Local communities near Mouthcard include Fedscreek, which plays host to the local elementary school, as well as Lick Creek, which is home to East Ridge High School.

In the Toonerville area of Mouthcard, an ancient Indian burial ground was discovered and some of the artifacts found there are now on display at the Breaks Interstate Park- about 25 miles southwest of Mouthcard.

== History ==
Mouthcard was founded by the Ramey family over 200 years ago. The Rameys were deeply involved in railroad and logging companies throughout the area, which gave them rights to a large amount of land throughout the region. The family also have rights to most of the natural gas in the area, which contributes to the family income. The ancestral land has shrunk over the years as it has been deeded out to distant relatives and others, though many Rameys still live on the land remaining to the family.

In 1977, Mouthcard sustained damage when the Levisa Fork River flooded.

The life of the community is largely centered on its church, Mouthcard Baptist Church. Founded in 1890, it is the oldest known church in the Pike County Association of Southern Baptists. The church plays host to many community events.

Once a year, the community holds "Mouthcard Community Day." Activities include a free bean soup dinner and a free concert.
