= Big Shoal, Kentucky =

Unincorporated community in Kentucky, United States

Big Shoal
- Unincorporated community
- Location within the state of Kentucky Big Shoal (the United States)
- Coordinates: 37°30′47″N 82°33′51″W
- Country: United States
- State: Kentucky
- County: Pike
- Elevation: 669 ft (204 m)
- Time zone: UTC-6 (Central (CST))
  - Summer (DST): UTC-5 (CST)
- GNIS feature ID: 2337506

Big Shoal is an unincorporated community and coal town in Pike County, Kentucky, United States. Its post office has been closed.
