= Hamlack, Kentucky =

Unincorporated community in Kentucky, United States

Hamlack
- Unincorporated community
- Location within the state of Kentucky Hamlack (the United States)
- Coordinates: 37°31′46″N 82°35′42″W
- Country: United States
- State: Kentucky
- County: Pike
- Elevation: 666 ft (203 m)
- Time zone: UTC-6 (Central (CST))
  - Summer (DST): UTC-5 (CST)
- GNIS feature ID: 2120804

Hamlack is an unincorporated community and coal town in Pike County, Kentucky, United States.
