= Jim Ramey =

American gridiron football player (born 1957)

No. 79, 68, 78, 98
- Position: Defensive end

Personal information
- Born: March 9, 1957 (age 69); Louisville, Kentucky, U.S.
- Listed height: 6 ft 4 in (1.93 m)
- Listed weight: 261 lb (118 kg)

Career information
- High school: Belfry (KY)
- College: Kentucky
- NFL draft: 1979: 3rd round, 70th overall pick

Career history
- Cleveland Browns (1979)*; St. Louis Cardinals (1979); Hamilton Tiger-Cats (1980–1982); Tampa Bay Bandits (1983–1985); Tampa Bay Buccaneers (1987)
- * Offseason or practice squad member only

Career NFL statistics
- Games played: 10
- Stats at Pro Football Reference

Career CFL statistics
- Games played: 26

James Edward Ramey Jr. (born March 9, 1957) is an American former gridiron football defensive end who played eight seasons in the National Football League (NFL), Canadian Football League (CFL), and United States Football League (USFL) for the St. Louis Cardinals, Hamilton Tiger-Cats, Tampa Bay Bandits, and Tampa Bay Buccaneers. He played college football at Kentucky and was drafted in the 3rd round of the 1979 NFL draft by the Cleveland Browns.

== Early life and education ==
Jim Ramey was born on March 9, 1957, in Louisville, Kentucky. His family moved to the unincorporated community of Belfry, Kentucky, when he was young. His childhood home was built in between multiple mountains. "We live in the hills right down IN the hills," Ramey said. "If we look out the front door we see a mountain. If we look out the back door we see another mountain. If we look out a window on either side, we see more mountains." He attended Belfry High School, playing fullback and defensive end for the same team his father, Ed, played for.

He received multiple scholarship offers following high school, including from Kentucky, Arkansas, and Ohio State. He accepted the offer from Kentucky, as it was closest to home. Ramey said, "They came to the door and me and my father said, 'Give it here and we'll sign it.' I don't care for city life, and when I visited Ohio State, there was nothing but city everywhere I looked. At least there's some natural ground in Lexington. I got two phone calls and a lot of literature from Arkansas, too. But I wouldn't have cared if Arkansas sent a bunch of cheerleaders to see me or if Ohio State gave me a gold Cadillac. My mind was set on it." In his first season with Kentucky, he earned a varsity letter as the Wildcats finished with a 2–8–1 record. The team rebounded in his sophomore season, compiling a 8–4 record and earning a victory in the Peach Bowl.

Teammate Richard Jaffe said, "He’s a crazy guy off the field but once he puts on the helmet James is all business. He's one of the quickest guys with his hands and his feet on the whole team . . . James is probably the most underrated player on our defensive unit. Next year, he's going to be a great one." An article in the Lexington Herald-Leader wrote, "James Ramey sheds blockers with a single swipe. He leaps fallen foes to "visit" any ball carrier headed his way. He is quicker than the opposing linemen can imagine. He is not superman. He is a good football player."

== Professional career ==
Following his college career, Ramey was selected in the 3rd round (70th overall) of the 1979 NFL draft by the Cleveland Browns. After being selected, Browns coach Sam Rutigliano said Ramey "isn't the answer at defensive end, but he will help upgrade the position." Ramey said, "I'm aware of the situation here, but it doesn't bother me. I know the guys the Browns wanted (Mike Bell, Dan Hampton, Al Harris) are fantastic talents, but they took me in the third round, so they must have seen something in me. I don't think so high that I can step right in and start. But everybody thinks his best is good enough and I feel the same way. Now, we'll just have to wait and see." He was released by the Browns at roster cuts.

In late October, Ramey was given a contract by the St. Louis Cardinals. To make room on the roster, the Cardinals released tight end Al Chandler. Less than a week later, Ramey appeared in his first National Football League (NFL) game, a 37–7 victory over the Minnesota Vikings. He also appeared in the next six games, only missing the week 17 finale. He finished his first season with seven games played. He was released at the 1980 roster cuts.

Shortly after being released by the Cardinals, Ramey was signed by the Hamilton Tiger-Cats of the Canadian Football League (CFL). He appeared in six games during the 1980 season, helping them go to the 68th Grey Cup, where they lost, 48–10, against the Edmonton Eskimos. In October 1981, after playing in twelve 1981 games, he was waived. He returned to the team in the following season and played in eight games.

He joined the Tampa Bay Bandits of the newly formed United States Football League (USFL) in 1983, starting all eighteen games as left defensive end. When Mike Butler, a defensive end who played for the Green Bay Packers, joined, Ramey switched to right defensive end rather than accept a backup role. However, he was still given a backup role following Butler's arrival. Though he did appear in all eighteen games as before, only five of them were as a starter. Zenon Andrusyshyn, a teammate of Ramey and writer for The Tampa Tribune called him the "jokester" of the team, writing, "Everybody has had tricks played on them by James Ramey, from having their uniforms screwed into their locker, to having a trap set whereby a bucket of water would drop when a locker was opened, to having their lockers taped completely closed. James has done that to practically everybody on the team." The Bandits folded following the 1986 season and he subsequently retired.

After spending the 1986 season in retirement as an insurance salesman, Ramey unretired in 1987 to join the Tampa Bay Buccaneers as a replacement player during the 1987 NFL strike. "I honestly felt my playing days were over." he said. "But I've got that feeling again . . . that tingle up and down my back that I only get from football." The Bradenton Herald published a journal written by Ramey, describing his return to professional football. The first entry of his journal read, "The second I stepped on the team bus for the short trip to the airport the familiar feeling of anticipation began to churn. It's been a long time. But it felt good. No it felt great. Surprise! We actually had fans at One Buc Place wish us luck. We were waiting to board the plane' when a former teammate of mine with the Bandits turned to me and said "You know I never thought I would be getting on a plane to play a football game again in my life." It was like he had read my mind."

He played his first game of 1987 on October 4, versus the Detroit Lions. The Buccaneers won the game 31–27. The next game was against the San Diego Chargers, which they lost, 13–17. In an interview before the final replacement game, and the final of his career, Ramey said, "Joining the replacement Bucs proved to me that 30 is too old to play football. I feel like I'm 60. My legs are yelling, 'Hello, you old fool.' . . . I want to leave every bit of football that's in me out on that field. When it's over I'll feel sad, but I'll feel good, too. I was deprived of an ending to my football career. Now I've been able to come out here and put it to rest . . . close the door . . . write the final chapter." He won his final game against the Minnesota Vikings, 20–10. Following the game he was released and then retired. He played in three games, making one tackle, with the Buccaneers.

Ramey finished his career with ten NFL games, twenty-six CFL games, and at least thirty-six USFL games.
