= Raccoon (disambiguation) =

A raccoon is a medium-sized mammal native to North and Central America. The term may also be applied more widely to any member of the genus Procyon or family Procyonidae.

Raccoon or racoon may also refer to:

- Racoon (band), a Dutch rock band
- Raccoon, Indiana
- Raccoon, Kentucky
- Raccoon, Pennsylvania
- HMS Racoon, any of several ships of the British Royal Navy
- USS Raccoon, any of several ships of the United States Navy
- The Raccoons, a Canadian animated television series of 1985-1992
- Raccoon City, a setting in the Resident Evil franchise
- Racoon (KAME), a key-exchange management daemon for Internet security
- Renault Racoon, a 4x4 concept vehicle
- Raccoon River, a tributary of the Des Moines River in Iowa in the United States

== See also ==
- Raccoon Creek (disambiguation)
- Raccoon Township (disambiguation)
- Raccoon dog, a species of canid
  - Japanese raccoon dog or tanuki, a subspecies of raccoon-dog often translated into English as "raccoon"
- List of fictional raccoons
- "Rocky Raccoon", a song by The Beatles
- Raccoin, a 2026 video game
- Raccoon butterflyfish (Chaetodon lunula)
