= Dunleary, Kentucky =

Unincorporated community in Kentucky, United States

Dunleary
- Unincorporated community
- Location within the state of Kentucky Dunleary (the United States)
- Coordinates: 37°19′5″N 82°21′59″W
- Country: United States
- State: Kentucky
- County: Pike
- Elevation: 764 ft (233 m)
- Time zone: UTC-6 (Central (CST))
  - Summer (DST): UTC-5 (CST)
- GNIS feature ID: 507892

Dunleary is an unincorporated community and coal town in Pike County, Kentucky, United States. The Dunleary post office is closed.
