= Stopover, Kentucky =

Community in Kentucky, United States

- Unincorporated community
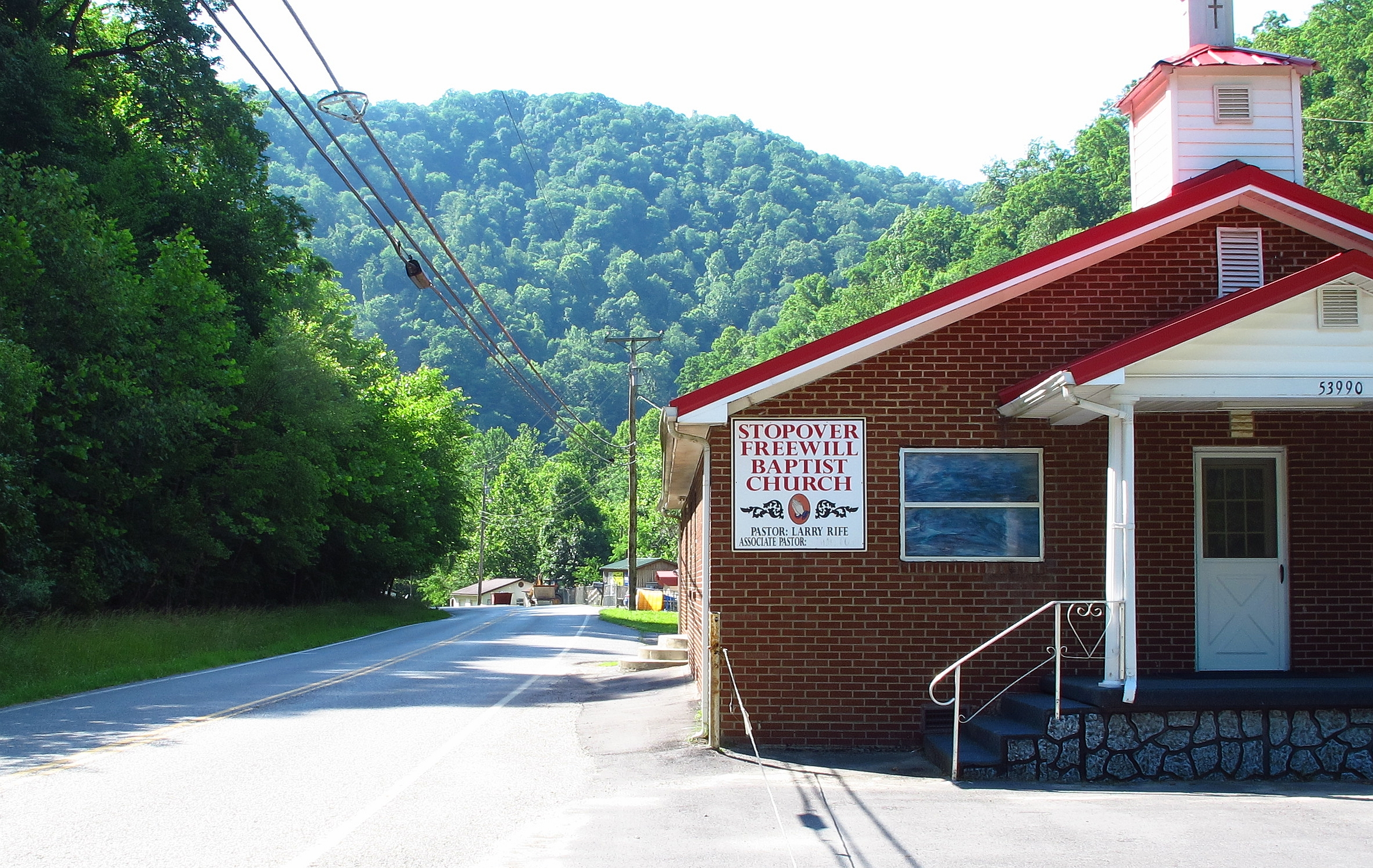
- Route 194 in Stopover

- Location within Kentucky
- Coordinates: 37°30′57″N 82°05′28″W
- Country: United States
- State: Kentucky
- County: Pike
- Elevation: 1,109 ft (338 m)
- Time zone: UTC-5 (Eastern (EST))
  - Summer (DST): UTC-4 (EDT)
- ZIP code: 41568
- Area code: 606
- GNIS feature ID: 509142

Stopover is an unincorporated community in Pike County, Kentucky, United States that was established on August 14, 1949. It is at the junction of Kentucky Route 194 and Kentucky Route 2062 3.5 miles (5.6 km) east of Phelps. Stopover had a post office with ZIP code 41568.

The town's name came from its first postmaster who also owned the local general store. He would often tell people to "stop over and see" him.

The town is home to a small country store and four churches: Shepard Memorial Presbyterian Church, Stopover Church of God, Stopover Freewill Baptist Church, and Camp Creek Pentecostal Church.

== Notable people ==
- Don Blankenship, business executive, born in Stopover.
