= Shelbiana, Kentucky =

Unincorporated community in Kentucky, United States

- Unincorporated community
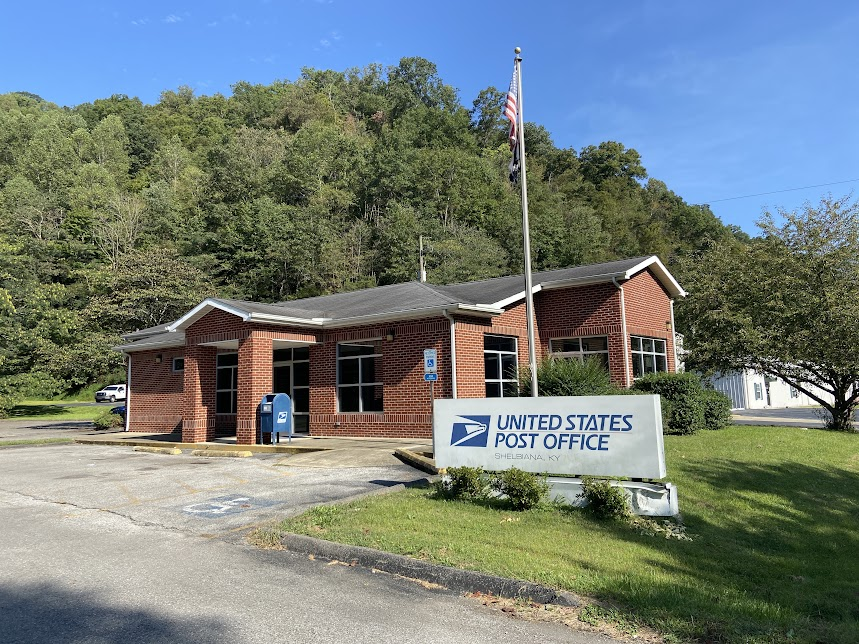
- Shelbiana Post Office

- Location within the state of Kentucky Shelbiana, Kentucky (the United States)
- Coordinates: 37°25′31″N 82°29′35″W
- Country: United States
- State: Kentucky
- County: Pike
- Elevation: 810 ft (250 m)
- Time zone: UTC-6 (Eastern (EST))
  - Summer (DST): UTC-5 (CST)
- ZIP codes: 41562
- GNIS feature ID: 503312

Shelbiana is an unincorporated community and coal town in Pike County, Kentucky, United States.

It houses the CSX railroad yard (formerly Chessie System, C & O, B & O), the second-largest railroad yard in the state of Kentucky. Coal originating in this yard was shipped to multiple states and a few foreign countries.

The Shelbiana post office was located near the railroad yard until the late 1990s when US 23 was rerouted and land to build a new facility was made available near the community of Ford's Branch. Glima Bea Slone Allen was the postmaster for a number of years until her retirement in the early 1980s. She died in 2018, two months shy of her 100th birthday. Today this location serves 2,807 Shelbiana residents with a median income of $31,797. Approximately 4,480 packages pass through this post office each year.

Before disbanding, the Ringling Bros. and Barnum & Bailey Circus would stop their train while heading to their winter home in Jacksonville, Florida, and stage impromptu performances for local residents free of charge.

Communities in the area included Back Bottom, Greasy Creek, Ford's Branch, Dry Fork, School House Hill, and the Knoll. The YMCA served the communities in Shelbiana until its closure in the late 1990s.
