= Sharondale, Kentucky =

Unincorporated community in Kentucky, United States

Sharondale
- Unincorporated community
- Location within the state of Kentucky Sharondale (the United States)
- Coordinates: 37°36′36″N 82°16′6″W
- Country: United States
- State: Kentucky
- County: Pike
- Elevation: 725 ft (221 m)
- Time zone: UTC-6 (Central (CST))
  - Summer (DST): UTC-5 (CST)
- GNIS feature ID: 509041

Sharondale is an unincorporated community and coal town in Pike County, Kentucky, United States. Its post office has been closed.
