= Beefhide, Kentucky =

Unincorporated community in Kentucky, United States

- Unincorporated community
- Location in Kentucky Location in the United States
- Coordinates: 37°14′23″N 82°37′39″W
- Country: United States
- State: Kentucky
- County: Letcher and Pike
- Elevation: 1,214 ft (370 m)
- Time zone: UTC-5 (Eastern (EST))
  - Summer (DST): UTC-4 (EDT)
- GNIS feature ID: 507483

Beefhide is an unincorporated community spanning across a county line between Letcher County and Pike County, Kentucky, United States.

== History ==
A post office was established at Beefhide in 1901, and remained in operation until 1956. The community takes its name from nearby Beefhide Creek.

== Geography ==
Beefhide is located along Beefhide Creek which runs east and north out of Letcher County, into Pike County. The post office location per GNIS (37.2367436°N 82.6357730°W) is in Pike County, Kentucky and the populated place location per GNIS is in both Letcher County and Pike County (37.2398277°N 82.6273777°W and 37.2414945°N 82.6218220°W).
