= Huddy, Kentucky =

Unincorporated community in Kentucky, United States

- Unincorporated community
- Location within Kentucky
- Coordinates: 37°35′41″N 82°16′32″W
- Country: United States
- State: Kentucky
- County: Pike
- Elevation: 755 ft (230 m)
- Time zone: UTC-5 (Eastern (EST))
  - Summer (DST): UTC-4 (EDT)
- ZIP code: 41535
- Area code: 606
- GNIS feature ID: 494719

Huddy is an unincorporated community in Pike County, Kentucky. Huddy is located at the junction of U.S. Route 119 and Kentucky Route 199 15.5 miles (24.9 km) east-northeast of Pikeville. Huddy had a post office, which closed on January 22, 2011.
