= Little Floyd County, Kentucky =

Unincorporated community in Kentucky, United States

- Unincorporated community
- Location within Kentucky
- Coordinates: 37°33′49″N 82°35′55″W
- Country: United States
- State: Kentucky
- County: Pike
- Elevation: 774 ft (236 m)
- Time zone: UTC-5 (Eastern (EST))
  - Summer (DST): UTC-4 (EDT)
- Area code: 606
- GNIS feature ID: 2337864

Little Floyd County is an unincorporated community in Pike County, Kentucky, United States. Little Floyd County is located on Mare Creek 7.3 miles (11.7 km) northwest of Pikeville.
