= Right Fork of Long Fork, Kentucky =

Unincorporated community in Kentucky, United States

Right Fork of Long Fork
- Unincorporated community
- Location within the state of Kentucky Right Fork of Long Fork (the United States)
- Coordinates: 37°16′31″N 82°41′42″W
- Country: United States
- State: Kentucky
- County: Pike
- Elevation: 1,489 ft (454 m)
- Time zone: UTC-5 (Eastern (EST))
  - Summer (DST): UTC-4 (EDT)
- GNIS feature ID: 2337005

Right Fork of Long Fork is an unincorporated community located in Pike County, Kentucky, United States.
