= Woods, Kentucky =

Unincorporated community in Kentucky, United States

- Unincorporated community
- Location within the state of Kentucky Woods (the United States)
- Coordinates: 37°38′8″N 82°39′10″W
- Country: United States
- State: Kentucky
- County: Floyd
- Elevation: 702 ft (214 m)
- Time zone: UTC-5 (Eastern (EST))
  - Summer (DST): UTC-4 (EDT)
- GNIS feature ID: 509403

Woods is an unincorporated community and coal town in Floyd County, Kentucky, United States. It is on Kentucky Route 194 and Kentucky Route 1428.
