= Varney, Kentucky =

Unincorporated community in Kentucky, United States

Varney is an unincorporated community in Pike County, Kentucky, United States. Its ZIP Code is 41571; the population of the 41571 ZIP Code Tabulation Area (ZCTA) was 543 at the 2000 census.

== Geography ==
Varney is located at 37°38′19″N 82°25′18″W (37.609843, -82.418289).

According to the United States Census Bureau, the ZCTA has a total area of 14.67 sq mi, all land.

== In popular culture ==
In the 2007 action-thriller film The Bourne Ultimatum, it is revealed that the birth date that CIA Deputy Director Pamela Landy gives to Jason Bourne during a phone conversation, 4/15/71, is not his actual date of birth, and therefore a code. When searching for Bourne, the agents of Operation Blackbriar, who have eavesdropped on the call, try to figure out what the code means. One agent discerns that when converted into longitude and latitude coordinates, it indicates a location in Cameroon. Another agent says that 41571 is the ZIP code for Varney, Kentucky. It is eventually determined that the code is an instruction to Bourne, telling him to go to 415 East 71st Street in New York City.
