= Belfry, Kentucky =

Unincorporated community in Kentucky, United States

- Census-designated place
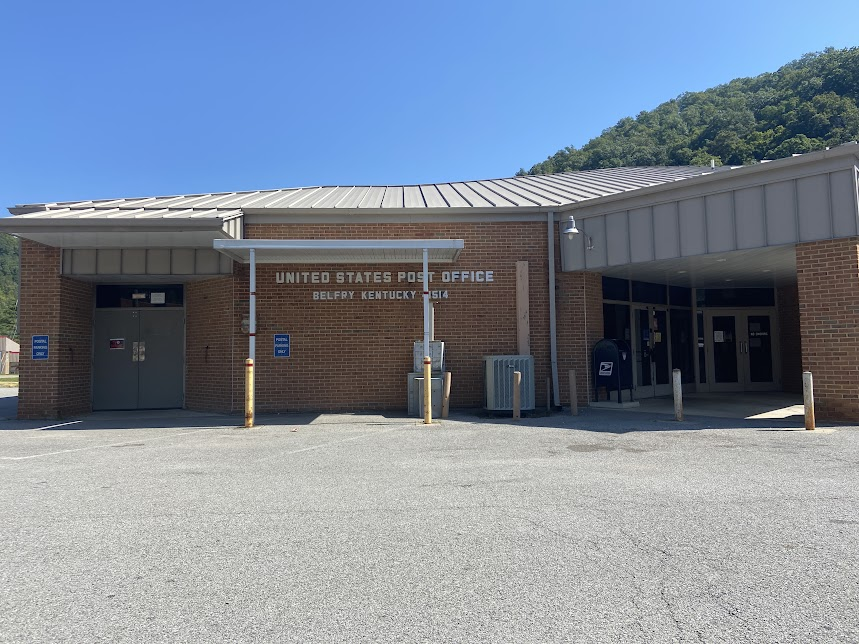
- Belfry courthouse and post office

- Location within Kentucky
- Coordinates: 37°37′10″N 82°16′06″W
- Country: United States
- State: Kentucky
- County: Pike

Area
  - Total: 0.72 sq mi (1.87 km^{2})
  - Land: 0.72 sq mi (1.87 km^{2})
  - Water: 0 sq mi (0.00 km^{2})
- Elevation: 699 ft (213 m)

Population (2020)
  - Total: 263
  - Density: 364.7/sq mi (140.81/km^{2})
- Time zone: UTC-5 (Eastern (EST))
  - Summer (DST): UTC-4 (EDT)
- ZIP code: 41514
- Area code: 606
- GNIS feature ID: 486781

Belfry is an unincorporated community and census-designated place in Pike County, Kentucky. Belfry is located on U.S. Route 119, 16.8 miles (27.0 km) northeast of Pikeville. Belfry has a post office with ZIP code 41514, which opened on February 26, 1921. The origin of the name "Belfry" is obscure.

Some of the community was treated by the United States Census Bureau as a census-designated place in 2020 with a recorded population of 263.

The larger community of South Williamson borders Belfry to northwest.

Public education in Belfry is administered by the Pike County Public School System, which operates Belfry High School. Schools also include Belfry Elementary School (formally known as Southside Elementary) and Belfry Middle School. Belfry has a lending library, a branch of the Pike County Public Library.

== Demographics ==
Historical population
Census	Pop.	Note	%±
2020	263		—
U.S. Decennial Census

== Notable people ==
- Jim Ramey (born 1957), gridiron football player
- Pearl Frances Runyon (1913 – 1989) former Kentucky State Treasurer
