= Steele, Kentucky =

Unincorporated community in Kentucky, United States

- Unincorporated community
- Location within Kentucky
- Coordinates: 37°24′12″N 82°12′03″W
- Country: United States
- State: Kentucky
- County: Pike
- Elevation: 1,076 ft (328 m)
- Time zone: UTC-5 (Eastern (EST))
  - Summer (DST): UTC-4 (EDT)
- ZIP code: 41566
- Area code: 606
- GNIS feature ID: 517537

Steele is an unincorporated community in Pike County, Kentucky. Steele is 18.2 miles (29.3 km) east-southeast of Pikeville. Steele has a post office with ZIP code 41566, which opened on February 5, 1906.
