= Canada, Kentucky =

Unincorporated community in Kentucky, United States

- Unincorporated community
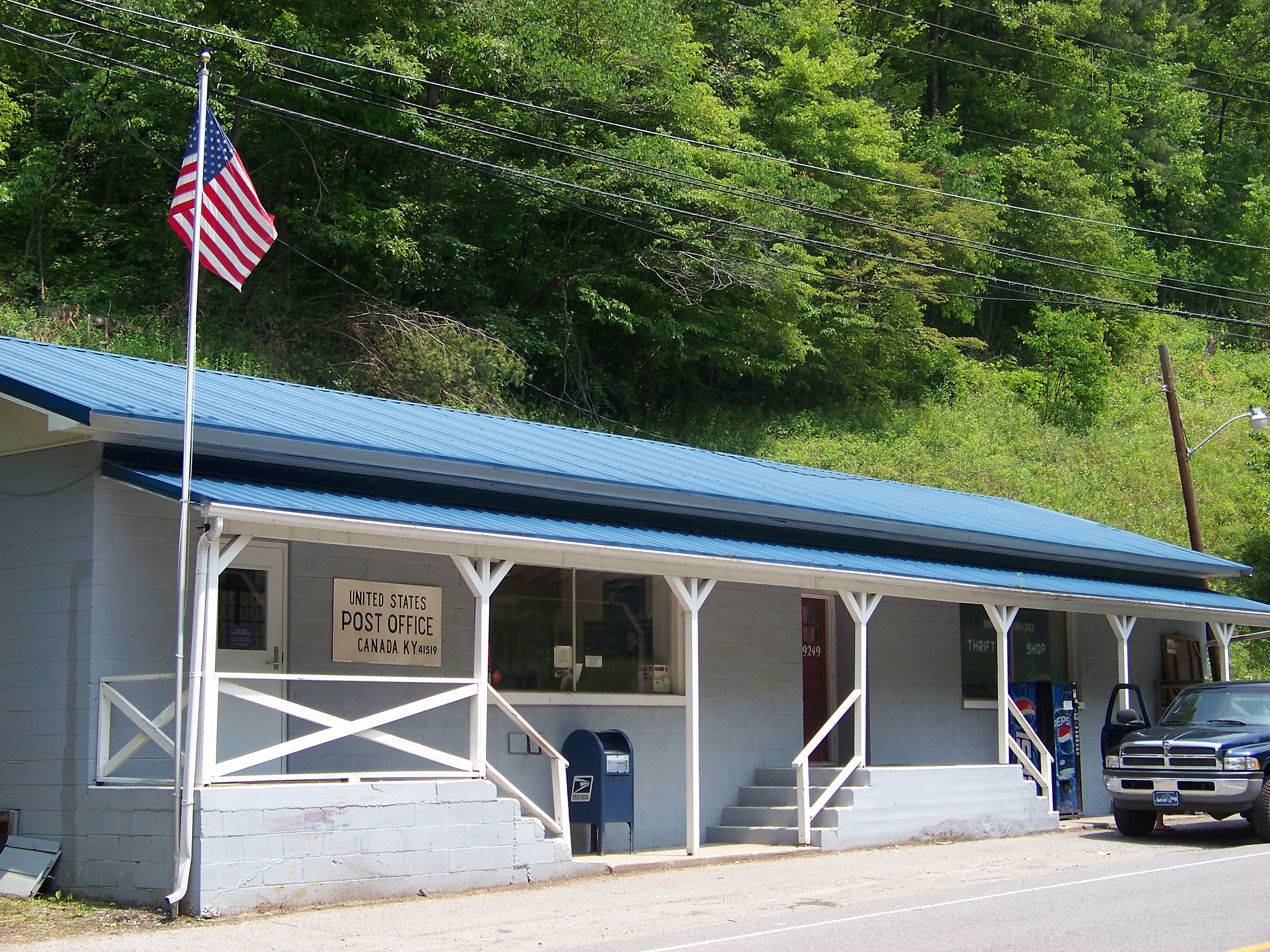
- Post office in Canada, Kentucky

- Location within Kentucky
- Coordinates: 37°36′20″N 82°19′28″W
- Country: United States
- State: Kentucky
- County: Pike
- Elevation: 833 ft (254 m)
- Time zone: UTC-5 (Eastern (EST))
  - Summer (DST): UTC-4 (EDT)
- ZIP code: 41519
- Area code: 606
- GNIS feature ID: 507642

Canada is an unincorporated community in Pike County, Kentucky. Canada is located on U.S. Route 119, 13.8 miles (22.2 km) northeast of Pikeville.

There are two possible scenarios for the origin of the name "Canada". One possible explanation being that Canada (or “kanata”) is the Huron-Iroquois word for settlement, since the area once had a large population of Native Americans. The other explanation involves Zebulon Pike, a general in the War of 1812 who most of Pike County is named after. Pike died in Canada, which leads to this being a possible origin of the name "Canada".
