= Raccoon Township =

Raccoon Township may refer to the following places:

- Raccoon Township, Marion County, Illinois
- Raccoon Township, Parke County, Indiana
- Raccoon Township, Gallia County, Ohio
- Raccoon Township, Beaver County, Pennsylvania

== See also ==
- Raccoon (disambiguation)
