= McAndrews, Kentucky =

Unincorporated community in Kentucky, United States

McAndrews
- Unincorporated community
- Location within the state of Kentucky McAndrews (the United States)
- Coordinates: 37°34′25″N 82°16′6″W
- Country: United States
- State: Kentucky
- County: Pike
- Elevation: 971 ft (296 m)
- Time zone: UTC-5 (Eastern (EST))
  - Summer (DST): UTC-4 (EDT)
- ZIP codes: 41543
- GNIS feature ID: 497762

McAndrews is an unincorporated community in Pike County, Kentucky, United States. Their post office opened in 1921. It was also known as Pinson.
