= Beefhide Creek =

Stream in Letcher and Pike County, Kentucky, U.S.

Coordinates: 37.2892720°N 82.5984882°W

Beefhide Creek is a stream in Letcher and Pike Counties of the U.S. state of Kentucky.

According to tradition, the creek received its name from an early incident in which a cow hide was hung to dry near its banks.

== See also ==
- List of rivers of Kentucky
