= Emma, Kentucky =

Unincorporated community in Kentucky, United States

- Unincorporated community
- Location within the state of Kentucky Emma (the United States)
- Coordinates: 37°38′7″N 82°42′1″W
- Country: United States
- State: Kentucky
- County: Floyd
- Elevation: 640 ft (200 m)
- Time zone: UTC-5 (Eastern (EST))
  - Summer (DST): UTC-4 (EST)
- ZIP codes: 41625
- GNIS feature ID: 491764

Emma is an unincorporated community and coal town in Floyd County, Kentucky, United States.

== History ==
A post office was established in the community in 1908. The origins of the place name Emma are unclear: some hold it was named for the wife of the congressman John W. Langley, while others believe it was named for the wife of a prominent realtor.

On February 28, 1958, eight children who lived in Emma died in the Prestonsburg, Kentucky, bus crash. One of the victim's bodies was found on April 16. Her uncle headed volunteer search efforts to help recover bodies from the crash site for months after the crash.

== Geography ==
Emma is located on Kentucky Route 1428, east of Kentucky Route 194.
