= McVeigh, Kentucky =

Unincorporated community in Kentucky, United States

McVeigh
- Unincorporated community
- Location within the state of Kentucky McVeigh (the United States)
- Coordinates: 37°32′18″N 82°15′22″W
- Country: United States
- State: Kentucky
- County: Pike
- Elevation: 984 ft (300 m)
- Time zone: UTC-6 (Central (CST))
  - Summer (DST): UTC-5 (Est)
- ZIP codes: 41546
- GNIS feature ID: 497950

McVeigh is an unincorporated community and coal town in Pike County, Kentucky, United States. Their post office closed in 2004.
