= Pearl Frances Runyon =

American politician (1913–1989)

27th Kentucky State Treasurer
- In office 1949–1956
- Governor: Earle Clements; Lawrence Wetherby; Happy Chandler
- Preceded by: Edward F. Seiller
- Succeeded by: Henry H. Carter

Personal details
- Born: 1913 Belfry, Kentucky, U.S.
- Died: March 17, 1989 (aged 75–76) Pikeville, Kentucky, U.S.
- Party: Democratic
- Parent: James Epperson Runyon
- Education: Belfry High School

Pearl Frances Runyon (1913 – March 17, 1989) was an American politician who served as Kentucky State Treasurer from 1949 to 1956. She was a member of the Democratic Party.

== Biography ==
Pearl Frances Runyon was born in 1913, in Belfry, Kentucky. She first became involved in politics at the age of 8, when her father, a merchant, lumber dealer, and building contractor who was active in politics, arranged for her to babysit the children of voters. In 1931, she graduated at the top of class at Belfry High School, and went on to graduate from a business school in Charleston, West Virginia.

Runyon began her career in politics in 1934, when she was elected deputy Pike County court clerk, a position she held for 14 years. In 1947, governor Earle Clements appointed her assistant secretary of state of Kentucky. In 1949, Edward F. Seiller died, leaving the office of treasurer vacant, she was appointed by governor Clements to fill the vacancy. In 1952, she was elected treasurer for a second term, becoming the second woman to be elected to the office.

== Death ==
Runyon died on March 17, 1989, at Mountain Manor Nursing Home in Pikeville, Kentucky, at the age of 76. Her funeral services were held at Steen Funeral Home in Ashland, Kentucky. She was interred at the Rose Hill Burial Park in Ashland.
