= Broad Bottom, Kentucky =

Unincorporated community in Kentucky, United States

- Unincorporated community
- Location within Kentucky Location within the United States
- Coordinates: 37°32′03″N 82°35′35″W
- Country: United States
- State: Kentucky
- County: Pike
- Elevation: 663 ft (202 m)
- Time zone: UTC-5 (Eastern (EST))
  - Summer (DST): UTC-4 (EDT)
- GNIS feature ID: 507587

Broad Bottom is an unincorporated community in Pike County, Kentucky, United States.

== History ==
Broad Bottom was named for its location "in a low-lying area" next to Levisa Fork. A post office opened in 1924, and closed in 1984. Broad Bottom was a flag stop on the Big Sandy Subdivision of the Chesapeake and Ohio Railway.
