= McCarr, Kentucky =

Unincorporated community in Kentucky, United States

McCarr
- Unincorporated community
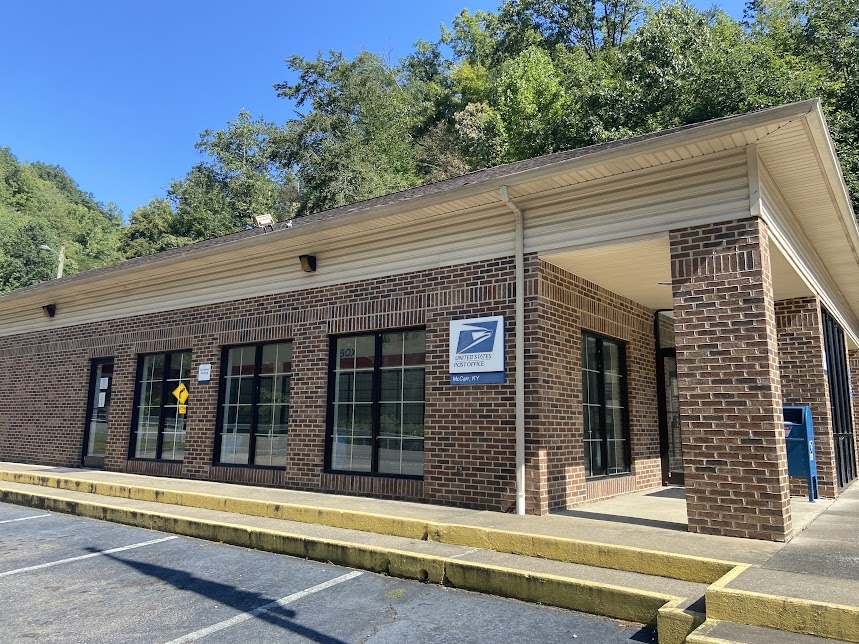
- McCarr post office

- Location in Pike County and the state of Kentucky.
- Coordinates: 37°33′39″N 82°10′11″W
- Country: United States
- State: Kentucky
- County: Pike

Area
  - Total: 0.24 sq mi (0.63 km^{2})
  - Land: 0.24 sq mi (0.63 km^{2})
  - Water: 0 sq mi (0.00 km^{2})
- Elevation: 692 ft (211 m)

Population (2020)
  - Total: 158
  - Density: 644.9/sq mi (248.99/km^{2})
- Time zone: UTC-6 (Central (CST))
  - Summer (DST): UTC-5 (CST)
- ZIP codes: 41544
- FIPS code: 21-48810
- GNIS feature ID: 508573

McCarr is an unincorporated community and census-designated place in rural northeastern Pike County, Kentucky, United States, along the Tug Fork River across from Matewan, West Virginia.

As of the 2020 census, McCarr had a population of 158.

== Demographics ==
Historical population
Census	Pop.	Note	%±
2020	158		—
U.S. Decennial Census
