= Cedarville, Kentucky =

- Former city
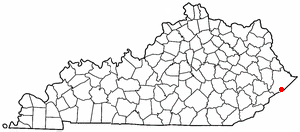
- Location of Cedarville, Kentucky
- Coordinates: 37°18′51″N 82°21′37″W
- Country: United States
- State: Kentucky
- County: Pike
- Incorporated: July 20, 1963

Area
  - Total: 0.077 sq mi (0.2 km^{2})
  - Land: 0.077 sq mi (0.2 km^{2})
  - Water: 0 sq mi (0.0 km^{2})
- Elevation: 994 ft (303 m)

Population (2000)
  - Total: 52
  - Density: 808/sq mi (312.1/km^{2})
- Time zone: UTC-5 (Eastern (EST))
  - Summer (DST): UTC-4 (EDT)
- ZIP code: 41522
- Area code: 606
- FIPS code: 21-13798
- GNIS feature ID: 1669495

Cedarville is a former city in Pike County, Kentucky, United States. The population was 52 at the 2000 census. On December 14, 2009, Cedarville became a part of Elkhorn City.

== Geography ==
Cedarville is located at 37°18′51″N 82°21′37″W (37.314057, -82.360233).

According to the United States Census Bureau, the city has a total area of 0.1 square miles (0.26 km^{2}), all land.

== Demographics ==
Historical population
Census	Pop.	Note	%±
1970	140		—
1980	81		−42.1%
1990	65		−19.8%
2000	52		−20.0%
U.S. Census Bureau

As of the census of 2000, there were 52 people, 24 households, and 16 families residing in the city. The population density was 808.3 inhabitants per square mile (312.1/km^{2}). There were 29 housing units at an average density of 450.8 per square mile (174.1/km^{2}). The racial makeup of the city was 100.00% White. Hispanic or Latino of any race were 9.62% of the population.

There were 24 households, out of which 25.0% had children under the age of 18 living with them, 50.0% were married couples living together, 4.2% had a female householder with no husband present, and 33.3% were non-families. 29.2% of all households were made up of individuals, and 25.0% had someone living alone who was 65 years of age or older. The average household size was 2.17 and the average family size was 2.69.

In the city the population was spread out, with 17.3% under the age of 18, 5.8% from 18 to 24, 28.8% from 25 to 44, 25.0% from 45 to 64, and 23.1% who were 65 years of age or older. The median age was 44 years. For every 100 females, there were 108.0 males. For every 100 females age 18 and over, there were 104.8 males.

The median income for a household in the city was $46,500, and the median income for a family was $50,125. Males had a median income of $50,375 versus $0 for females. The per capita income for the city was $21,045. None of the population and none of the families were below the poverty line.

== See also ==
- Breaks Interstate Park
- Russell Fork River
