= Pinsonfork, Kentucky =

Unincorporated community in Kentucky, United States

Pinsonfork
- Unincorporated community
- Location within the state of Kentucky Pinsonfork (the United States)
- Coordinates: 37°33′11″N 82°15′50″W
- Country: United States
- State: Kentucky
- County: Pike
- Elevation: 906 ft (276 m)
- Time zone: UTC-6 (Central (CST))
  - Summer (DST): UTC-5 (CST)
- ZIP codes: 41555
- GNIS feature ID: 500748

Pinsonfork is an unincorporated community and coal town in Pike County, Kentucky, United States.
