= Argo, Kentucky =

Unincorporated community in Kentucky, United States

Argo
- Unincorporated community
- Location within the state of Kentucky Argo (the United States)
- Coordinates: 37°28′50″N 82°3′47″W
- Country: United States
- State: Kentucky
- County: Pike
- Elevation: 892 ft (272 m)
- Time zone: UTC-6 (Central (CST))
  - Summer (DST): UTC-5 (CST)
- GNIS feature ID: 486024

Argo is an unincorporated community and coal town in Pike County, Kentucky, United States.
