= Fords Branch, Kentucky =

Unincorporated community in Kentucky, United States

Fords Branch
- Unincorporated community
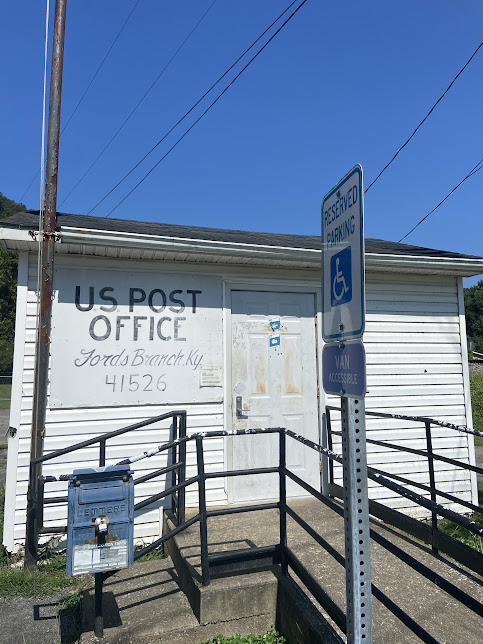
- Fords Branch post office

- Location within the state of Kentucky Fords Branch (the United States)
- Coordinates: 37°25′59″N 82°30′40″W
- Country: United States
- State: Kentucky
- County: Pike
- Elevation: 692 ft (211 m)
- Time zone: UTC-5 (Eastern (EST))
  - Summer (DST): UTC-4 (EDT)
- ZIP codes: 41526
- GNIS feature ID: 492313
- Website: www.fordsbranch.com

Fords Branch is an unincorporated community located in Pike County, Kentucky, United States. It was settled by Joseph Ford and his family just following the American Revolutionary War. Ford was a lieutenant in the North Carolina militia; his descendants still live there. Captain William Ford served during the Civil War and named Fords Branch for his wife, Malinda McGee Ford. The original name of Malinda Ford's Branch was shortened when the US Post Office was established in January 1903.
