= East Ridge High School (Kentucky) =

Location
- 19471 Lick Mountain Road; Lick Creek, KY 41540; United States

Information
- Type: Public
- Established: 2002
- School district: Pike County Schools (Kentucky)
- Principal: Eric Bartley
- Faculty: 30.00 (FTE)
- Grades: 9–12
- Enrollment: 395 (2025–26)
- Student to teacher ratio: 16.23
- Colors: Columbia and Navy
- Nickname: Warriors
- Website: East Ridge High School

East Ridge High School is a public secondary school located in Lick Creek, Kentucky, United States.

== History ==
East Ridge High School was built in 2002 by Elliott Contracting Inc. It was built for students from three smaller high schools: Elkhorn City High School, Feds Creek High School, and Millard High School. The school's first principal was Ralph Kilgore, who retired in 2007. In the 2007–2008 year, Kevin Justice became principal, with Mike Potter as assistant principal. During the 2009–2010 year, Melinda Potter also became an Assistant principal. Principal Kevin Justice retired at the end of the 2024–2025 school year. Eric Bartley became the school's new principal at the start of the 2025–2026 school year. Adam Farmer is the new assistant principal 2025–2026.

== Academics ==
Under coach Joey W. Hamilton, the East Ridge High School Academic Team has won two consecutive championship titles in the 59th district, as well as two additional district wins in recent years.

- 2010 59th District Governors Cup Champions
- 2011 59th District Governors Cup Champions
- 2015 59th District Governors Cup Champions
- 2017 59th District Governors Cup Champions

== Athletics ==
Although a relatively new school, East Ridge High School's athletic program has become competitive, winning regional championships.

=== Football ===
Year	Coach	Record	Playoffs
2002	Eric Ratliff	4–6	No
2003	Mike Davis	3–7	No
2004	Mike Davis	2–8	No
2005	Eric Ratliff	3–6	No
2006	Eric Ratliff	2–8	No
2007	Bobby Branham	0–10	No
2008	Brad Allen	1–9	No
2009	Brad Allen	3–8	First Round
2010	Brad Allen	5–6	First Round
2011	Brad Allen	0–9	No
2012	Brad Allen	1–9	No
2013	Brad Allen	6–4	No
2014	N/A	5–5	No
2015	Kenneth OQuinn / Brad Allen	4–7	First Round
2016	Brad Allen	4–6	No
2017	Brad Allen	5–6	First Round
2018	Ben Runyon	2–9	First Round
2019	Ben Runyon	1–9	No
2020	Ben Runyon	1–6	No
2021	Donnie Burdine	2–8	No
2022	Donnie Burdine	4–6	No
2023	Donnie Burdine	5–6	First Round
2024	Donnie Burdine	2–9	First Round
2025	Donnie Burdine	3–8	First Round
All time record			68–175

=== Volleyball ===
District Championships: 2003, 2006, 2007, 2009, 2011, 2012, 2016

District Runner-Ups- 2002, 2004, 2008, 2010, 2013, 2014, 2015, 2017, 2018, 2019, 2021, 2023

Year	Coach	Record	Playoffs
2002	Jill Morgan	18–8	Regional Quarterfinals
2003	Jill Morgan	15–8	Regional Semifinals
2004	Jonny Shortridge	16–11	Regional Quarterfinals
2005	Joey Hamilton	11–12	District Semifinals
2006	David Spradlin	11–12–1	Regional Quarterfinals
2007	David Spradlin	12–16	Regional Quarterfinals
2008	David Spradlin	15–12	Regional Quarterfinals
2009	David Spradlin	20–15	Regional Semifinals
2010	David Spradlin	14–14–2	Regional Quarterfinals
2011	David Spradlin	26–6	Regional Semifinals
2012	David Spradlin	28–5	Regional Finals
2013	David Spradlin	28–8	Regional Finals
2014	David Spradlin	28–12	Regional Semifinals
2015	David Spradlin	28–8	Regional Semifinals
2016	David Spradlin	26–11	Regional Quarterfinals
2017	David Spradlin	22–14	Regional Semifinals
2018	David Spradlin	25–11	Regional Semifinals
2019	David Spradlin	21–9	Regional Quarterfinals
2020	David Spradlin	7–10	District Semifinals
2021	David Spradlin	22–10	Regional Quarterfinals
2022	Tatiana Murphy	16–14	District Semifinals
2023	Tatiana Murphy	13–18	Regional Quarterfinals
2024	Tatiana Murphy	14–12	District Semifinals
2025	Brooke Fraley	15–14	District Semifinals
All time record			451–270–3

=== Boys' basketball ===
District Championships: 2003, 2004, 2016, 2021

District Runners-Up: 2005, 2008, 2010, 2012, 2013, 2014, 2015, 2022

Regional All “A” Championships: 2017

Regional All "A" Runners-Up: 2016

Regional Championships: 2004

Regional Runners-Up: 2012

Year	Coach	Record	Playoffs
2002–2003	James Hurley	19–10	Regional Quarterfinals
2003–2004	James Hurley	24–8	First Round State
2004–2005	James Hurley	18–11	Regional Quarterfinals
2005–2006	Denny Paul May	12–14	District Semifinals
2006–2007	Eric Ratliff	8–18	District Semifinals
2007–2008	Eric Ratliff	17–13	Regional Semifinals
2008–2009	Eric Ratliff	14–12	District Semifinals
2009–2010	Raymond Justice	11–12	Regional Quarterfinals
2010–2011	Raymond Justice	16–9	District Semifinals
2011–2012	Preston LeMaster	19–13	Regional Finals
2012–2013	Randy McCoy	16–15	Regional Semifinals
2013–2014	Randy McCoy	16–11	Regional Quarterfinals
2014–2015	Randy McCoy	15–12	Regional Quarterfinals
2015–2016	Randy McCoy	22–12	Regional Semifinals
2016–2017	Randy McCoy	19–11	District Semifinals
2017–2018	Randy McCoy	8–20	District Semifinals
2018–2019	Randy McCoy	12–16	District Semifinals
2019–2020	Brody Justice	10–16	District Semifinals
2020–2021	Brody Justice	15–9	Regional Semifinals
2021–2022	Brody Justice	16–15	Regional Quarterfinals
2022–2023	Brody Justice	12–16	District Semifinals
2023–2024	Brody Justice	10–19	District Semifinals/First Round Super Region
2024–2025	Adam Farmer	7–21	District Semifinals/ First Round Super Region
2025–2026	Adam Farmer	11–20	District Semifinals/ First Round Super Region
All time record			347–317

=== Girls' basketball ===
District Championships: 2010, 2011

District Runners-Up: 2005, 2006, 2007, 2013, 2015

Regional All “A” Championships: 2015

Regional All "A" Runners-Up: 2019

Year	Coach	Record	Playoffs
2002–2003	Denise Campbell	9–17	District Semifinals
2003–2004	Geary Walton	10–14	District Semifinals
2004–2005	Joe Marson	16–12	Regional Quarterfinals
2005–2006		14–14	Regional Quarterfinals
2006–2007	Jill Morgan	10–20	Regional Quarterfinals
2007–2008	Bobby Spears	11–16	District Semifinals
2008–2009	Bobby Spears	9–15	District Semifinals
2009–2010	Laura Denise Campbell	13–15	Regional Quarterfinals
2010–2011	Laura Denise Campbell	17–11	Regional Quarterfinals
2011–2012	Laura Denise Campbell	7–21	District Semifinals
2012–2013	Laura Denise Campbell	14–16	Regional Quarterfinals
2013–2014	Laura Denise Campbell	14–13	District Semifinal
2014–2015	Laura Denise Campbell	18–11	Regional Quarterfinals
2015–2016	Laura Denise Campbell	18–13	District Semifinals
2016–2017	Laura Denise Campbell	11–18	District Semifinals
2017–2018	Laura Denise Campbell	14–17	District Semifinals
2018–2019	Laura Denise Campbell	8–22	District Semifinals
2019–2020	Laura Denise Campbell	9–20	District Semifinals
2020–2021	Adam Farmer	5–22	District Semifinals
2021–2022	Adam Farmer	4–25	District Semifinals
2022–2023	Adam Farmer	3–27	District Semifinals
2023–2024	Shannon Keene	16–15	District Semifinals/First Round Super Region
2024–2025	Shannon Keene	12–15	District Semifinals/First Round Super Region
2024–2025	Shannon Keene	12–19	District Semifinals/ Second Round Super Region
All time record			274–408

=== Baseball ===
District Championships: 2008

District Runners-Up: 2003, 2004, 2005, 2006, 2007, 2009, 2010, 2012, 2014, 2015

Year	Coach	Record	Playoffs
2003		12–10	Regional Quarterfinals
2004	Kevin Justice	22–13	Regional Quarterfinals
2005	Kevin Justice	11–19	Regional Quarterfinals
2006	Kevin Justice	11–23	Regional semifinals
2007	David Spradlin	13–20	Regional Quarterfinals
2008	David Spradlin	15–13	Regional semifinals
2009	David Spradlin	13–10	Regional Quarterfinals
2010	David Spradlin	9–17	Regional Quarterfinals
2011	David Spradlin	10–14	District Semifinals
2012	Christopher Lawson	19–19–1	Regional Quarterfinals
2013	Christopher Lawson	7–18	District Semifinals
2014	Jordan Compton	11–24	Regional Semifinals
2015	Jordan Compton	11–11	Regional Quarterfinals
2016	Ben Runyon	5–20	District Semifinals
2017	Brandon Ratliff	1–18	District Semifinals
2018	Brandon Ratliff	3–18	District Semifinals
2019	Gavin Bishop	2–16	District Semifinals
2020	Gavin Bishop	COVID-19 Season Canceled
2021	Gavin Bishop	11–18	District Semifinals
2022	Austin Robinson	12–16	District Semifinals
2023	Austin Robinson	10–24	District Semifinals
2024	Austin Robinson	11–18	District Semifinals
2025	Aaron Ward	11–20	District Semifinals
All time record			230–379–1

=== Softball ===
District Championships: 2005, 2009, 2010, 2014, 2015

District Runners-Up: 2007, 2011, 2013, 2016, 2017

Regional Championships: 2007

Regional Runners-Up: 2005, 2012

Year	Coach	Record	Playoffs
2003		10–9	District Semifinals
2004	Jill Morgan	22–13	District Semifinals
2005	Jill Morgan	20–7	Regional Runners-Up
2006	Jill Morgan	18–15	District Semifinals
2007	Jill Morgan	19–12	Elite 8 State Tournament
2008	Jill Morgan	17–14	District Semifinals
2009	Jill Morgan	17–8	Regional Quarterfinals
2010	Jill Morgan	21–11	Regional Quarterfinals
2011	Jill Morgan	23–9	Regional Semifinals
2012	Jill Morgan	23–12	Regional Runners-Up
2013	Jill Morgan	19–17	Regional Semifinals
2014	Jill Morgan	23–13	Regional Quarterfinals
2015	Jill Morgan	16–16	Regional Semifinals
2016	David Spradlin	13–22	Regional Quarterfinals
2017	Jill Morgan	17–15	Regional Quarterfinals
2018	Eric Slone	12–18	District Semifinals
2019	Eric Slone	14–20	District Semifinals
2020	Eric Slone	COVID-19 Season Canceled
2021	Briann McCoy	1–16	District Semifinals
2022	MaKyla Epling	6–19	District Semifinals
2023	Crystal Baldridge	7–10	District Semifinals
2024	Crystal Baldridge	9–12	District Semifinals
2025	Crystal Baldridge	7–13	District Semifinals
All time record			334–301
