= Pike County Central High School =

School in Pikeville, Kentucky, United States

Location
- 100 Winners Circle Drive; Pikeville, Kentucky 41501; United States; 37.5145°N 82.5007°W

Information
- Established: 1993
- School district: Pike County Schools
- Teaching staff: 35.00 (FTE)
- Grades: 9-12
- Enrollment: 595 (2023-2024)
- Student to teacher ratio: 17.00
- Color
- Mascot: Hawk
- Website: https://pcchs.pike.kyschools.us/

Pike County Central High School (PCCHS) is a public high school located in Pikeville, Kentucky, United States. The school mascot is a hawk. The school motto is "Soaring To Greatness". PCCHS serves around 700 students in 9th to 12th grade. It is near downtown Pikeville.

== History ==
Pike County Central High School is the result of the 1993 consolidation of the former Johns Creek High School and Mullins High School.
