= Phyllis, Kentucky =

Unincorporated community in Kentucky, United States

Phyllis
- Unincorporated community
- Location within the state of Kentucky Phyllis (the United States)
- Coordinates: 37°26′33″N 82°20′10″W
- Country: United States
- State: Kentucky
- County: Pike
- Elevation: 889 ft (271 m)
- Time zone: UTC-5 (Eastern (EST))
  - Summer (DST): UTC-4 (EDT)
- ZIP codes: 41554
- GNIS feature ID: 492313

Phyllis is an unincorporated community located in Pike County, Kentucky, United States.
