= Belfry High School (Belfry, Kentucky) =

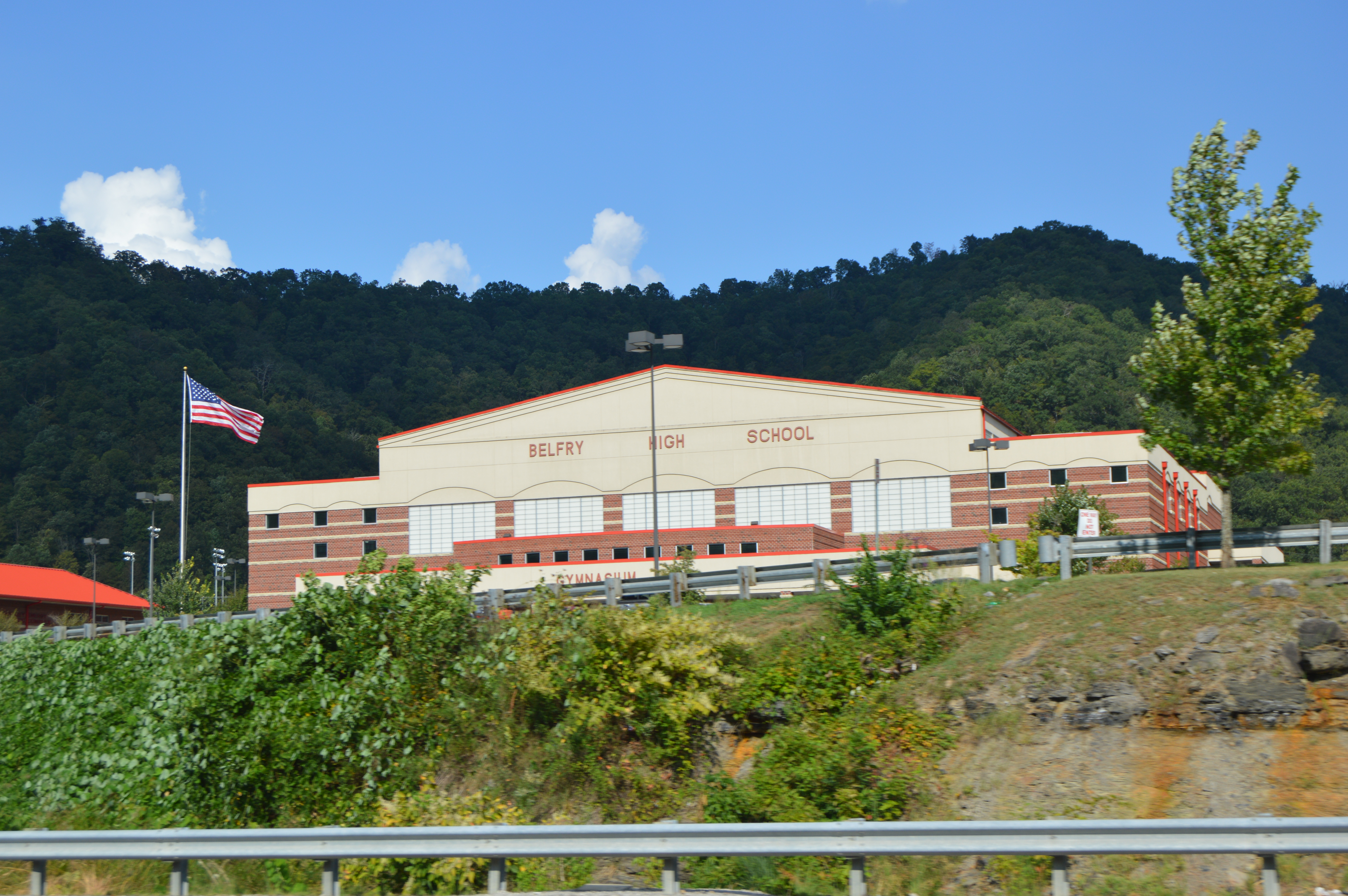
- Viewed from U.S. Route 119

Location
- 27678 U.S. Route 119; Belfry, Kentucky 41514; United States; 37°38′52″N 82°15′58″W

Information
- Type: Public
- Motto: Where Success is a Way of Life
- Established: 1923
- School district: Pike County Schools
- Superintendent: Reed Adkins
- Principal: Mark Gannon
- Teaching staff: 31.00 (FTE)
- Grades: 9–12
- Enrollment: 463 (2024–2025)
- Student to teacher ratio: 14.94
- Campus: Rural
- Colors: Red and white
- Athletics: 13 KHSAA Sports
- Athletics conference: Kentucky High School Athletic Association
- Mascot: Pirate
- Nickname: Pirates
- Newspaper: Treasure Chest
- Yearbook: Buccaneer
- Feeder schools: Belfry Middle School Belfry Elementary School Bevins Grade School
- Website: bhs.pike.kyschools.us

Belfry High School is a high school in Belfry, Kentucky, United States. The school is located in the northeastern region of Pike County, approximately 22 miles northeast of Pikeville, Kentucky and 1 mile south of Williamson, West Virginia. The school moved from Belfry in 2005 to a new site 3 miles north near the West Virginia border in Goody, Kentucky. The school is one of five public high schools in the Pike County Public School System and one of six public high schools in Pike County.

== History ==
Belfry High School was established in 1923 and located along U.S. Route 119. Then in 2005, Belfry High School constructed a new larger building and opened that year while the old Belfry High School became Belfry Middle School. The new Belfry High School's campus consisted of a main building and an athletic complex. In 2006, the Freshman Academy was established. The academy was ended in 2011.

== Athletics ==
The Pirate football team has been a source of pride for the community for many years. The Pirates first went to the state championship game in 1979 under then-head coach Dick Roddy, losing to Franklin-Simpson 33–0 in the Class 3A title In 1984, Belfry hired Phillip Haywood to be the new head coach. In his second season, the Pirates would make another run to the 3A state championship game, falling to Paducah Tilghman 29–14. The Pirates would return to the 3A title game again the following season, this time losing to Owensboro 14–0. Despite sustained success, the Pirates would not make another trip to state championship game until 2003, then in the 2A Class, winning the school's first-ever state championship 33–27 in an overtime thriller against Elizabethtown. 2004 would see the Pirates claim their second-consecutive 2A state championship, knocking off Owensboro Catholic 28–21. The Pirates would return to the state championship game in 2007 as a member of the 3A class, where they remain today. That year, they would fall to Louisville Central 27–17. The Pirates would return to the state championship game in 2010, 2011, and 2012, all three times losing to Central (46–7, 15–14, and 12–6 (OT)). Belfry would then appear in the next four state championship games, making a total of seven consecutive trips to the 3A title game. In 2013, they would beat Wayne County 3–0 to claim the school's third state title. During the 2013 season, Coach Haywood was named USA Today's National Coach of the Year. In 2014, they would beat old foe Central 14–7 in a revenge game. In 2015, the Pirates steamrolled Lexington Catholic 43–0. The Pirates would cap the "4-peat" with a 52–31 win over Central in 2016. The Pirates would not return to the state championship game until 2019, when they would knock off Bell County 30–20. In 2021, the Pirates would knock off Paducah Tilghman 33–28 in a rematch of the 1985 state championship for their 8th, and most recent, state championship. Following the 2021 season, running back Isaac Dixon was named Kentucky Mr. Football, becoming the first, and only, Pirate to take home the honor. Coach Haywood is Kentucky's all-time winningest football coach and ranks 5th nationally in wins among active head coaches.

== Notable alumni ==
- Janet Stumbo (1972): first woman from the 7th Judicial District to be elected to the Kentucky Court of Appeals; first woman elected to the Kentucky Supreme Court
- Pearl Frances Runyon (1931), former Kentucky State Treasurer
