= Raccoon, Kentucky =

Unincorporated community in Kentucky, United States

Raccoon
- Unincorporated community
- Location within the state of Kentucky Raccoon (the United States)
- Coordinates: 37°28′36″N 82°25′42″W
- Country: United States
- State: Kentucky
- County: Pike
- Elevation: 984 ft (300 m)
- Time zone: UTC-5 (Eastern (EST))
  - Summer (DST): UTC-4 (EDT)
- ZIP codes: 41557
- GNIS feature ID: 501493

Raccoon is an unincorporated community located in Pike County, Kentucky, United States.

The community was so named on account of raccoons near the original town site.

== Climate ==
The climate in this area is characterized by relatively high temperatures and evenly distributed precipitation throughout the year. The Köppen Climate System describes the weather as humid subtropical, and uses the abbreviation Cfa.
