= Freeburn, Kentucky =

Census-designated place in Kentucky, United States

Freeburn
- Unincorporated community & census-designated place
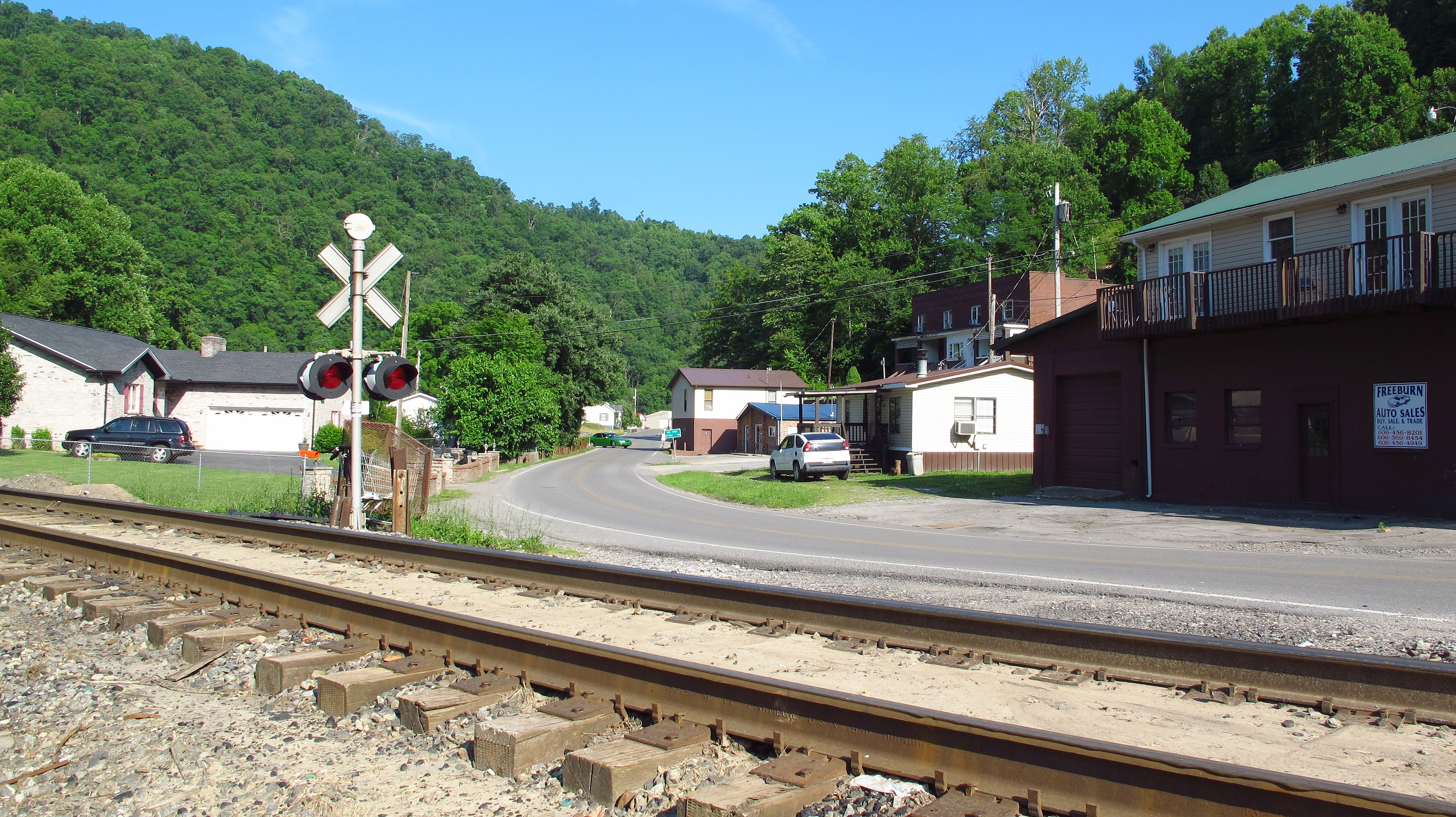
- Freeburn

- Location in Pike County and the state of Kentucky.
- Coordinates: 37°33′52″N 82°8′30″W
- Country: United States
- State: Kentucky
- County: Pike

Area
  - Total: 1.21 sq mi (3.13 km^{2})
  - Land: 1.21 sq mi (3.13 km^{2})
  - Water: 0 sq mi (0.00 km^{2})
- Elevation: 725 ft (221 m)

Population (2020)
  - Total: 296
  - Density: 245.0/sq mi (94.58/km^{2})
- Time zone: Eastern (EST)
  - Summer (DST): EST
- ZIP codes: 41528
- FIPS code: 21-29134
- GNIS feature ID: 492497

Freeburn is a census-designated place, unincorporated community and coal town in Pike County, Kentucky, United States. As of the 2020 census, Freeburn had a population of 296.

A post office called Liss was established in the community in 1911. In 1932, it was renamed Freeburn supposedly for a freeburning coal seam fire.

== Climate ==
The climate in this area is characterized by hot, humid summers and generally mild to cool winters. According to the Köppen Climate Classification system, Freeburn has a humid subtropical climate, abbreviated "Cfa" on climate maps.

== Demographics ==
Historical population
| Census | Pop. | Note | %± |
|---|---|---|---|
| 2010 | 399 | | — |
| 2020 | 296 | | −25.8% |
U.S. Decennial Census

Freeburn was first listed as a census designated place in the 2010 U.S. census.

=== Racial and ethnic composition ===
Freeburn CDP, Kentucky – Racial and ethnic composition Note: the US Census treats Hispanic/Latino as an ethnic category. This table excludes Latinos from the racial categories and assigns them to a separate category. Hispanics/Latinos may be of any race.
| Race / Ethnicity (NH = Non-Hispanic) | Pop 2010 | Pop 2020 | % 2010 | % 2020 |
|---|---|---|---|---|
| White alone (NH) | 398 | 288 | 99.75% | 97.30% |
| Black or African American alone (NH) | 0 | 2 | 0.00% | 0.68% |
| Native American or Alaska Native alone (NH) | 0 | 0 | 0.00% | 0.00% |
| Asian alone (NH) | 0 | 0 | 0.00% | 0.00% |
| Native Hawaiian or Pacific Islander alone (NH) | 0 | 0 | 0.00% | 0.00% |
| Other race alone (NH) | 0 | 0 | 0.00% | 0.00% |
| Mixed race or Multiracial (NH) | 0 | 4 | 0.00% | 1.35% |
| Hispanic or Latino (any race) | 1 | 2 | 0.25% | 0.68% |
| Total | 399 | 296 | 100.00% | 100.00% |
