= Lick Creek, Kentucky =

Unincorporated community in Kentucky, United States

Lick Creek
- Unincorporated community
- Location within the state of Kentucky Lick Creek (the United States)
- Coordinates: 37°22′49″N 82°17′50″W
- Country: United States
- State: Kentucky
- County: Pike
- Elevation: 925 ft (282 m)
- Time zone: UTC-5 (Eastern (EST))
  - Summer (DST): UTC-4 (EDT)
- ZIP codes: 41540
- GNIS feature ID: 508455

Lick Creek is an unincorporated community located in Pike County, Kentucky, United States.
