= Kimper, Kentucky =

Unincorporated community in Kentucky, United States

- Unincorporated community
- Location within Kentucky
- Coordinates: 37°29′49″N 82°21′02″W
- Country: United States
- State: Kentucky
- County: Pike
- Elevation: 919 ft (280 m)
- Time zone: UTC-5 (Eastern (EST))
  - Summer (DST): UTC-4 (EDT)
- ZIP code: 41539
- Area code: 606
- GNIS feature ID: 495732

Kimper is an unincorporated community in Pike County, Kentucky. Kimper is located at the junction of Kentucky Route 194 and Kentucky Route 632, 9.3 miles (15.0 km) east of Pikeville. Kimper has a post office with ZIP code 41539, which opened on August 8, 1919.
