= Phelps, Kentucky =

Census-designated place in Kentucky, United States

- CDP
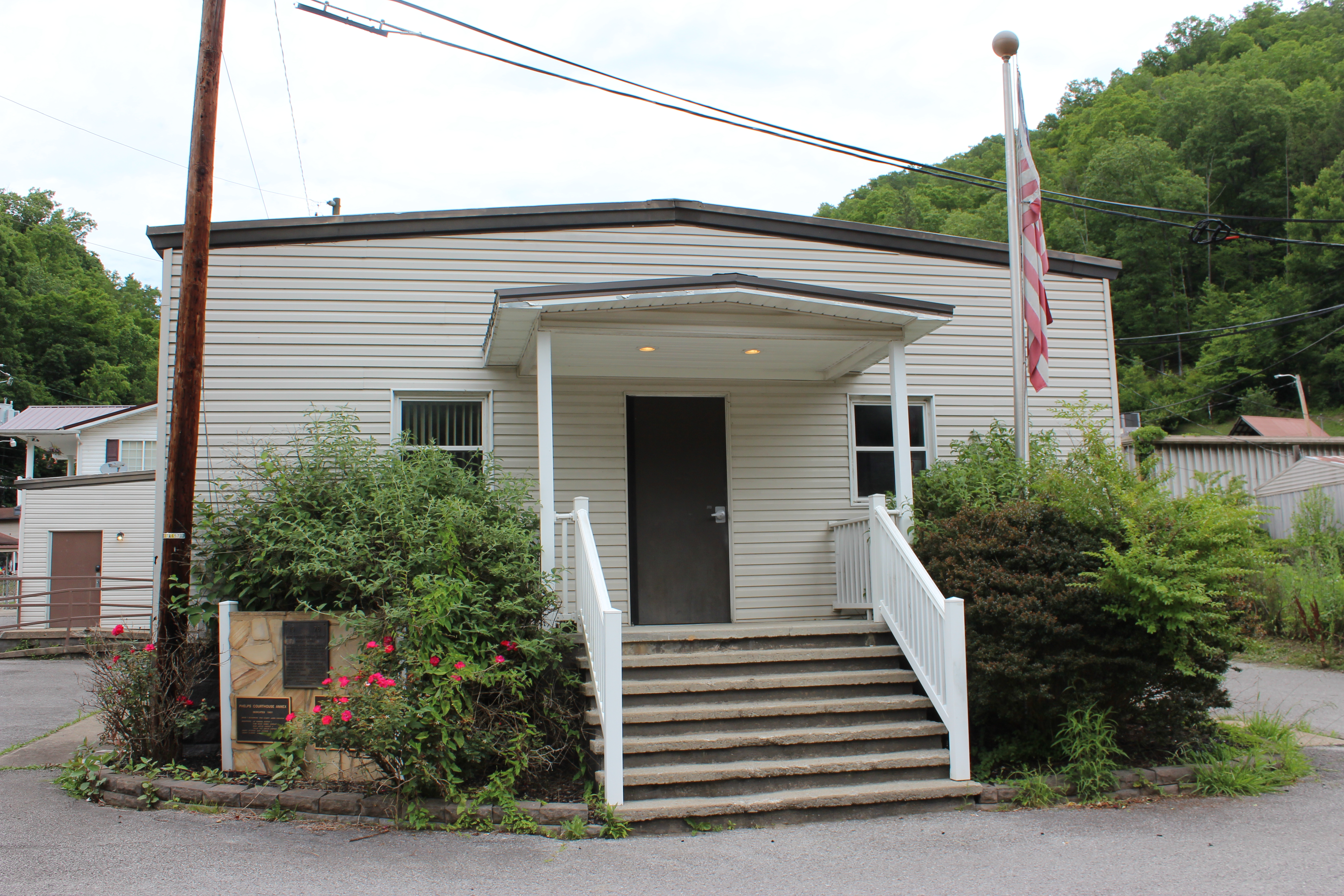
- Phelps Courthouse

- Location in Pike County and the state of Kentucky.
- Coordinates: 37°30′50″N 82°9′14″W
- Country: United States
- State: Kentucky
- County: Pike

Area
  - Total: 7.99 sq mi (20.70 km^{2})
  - Land: 7.99 sq mi (20.70 km^{2})
  - Water: 0 sq mi (0.00 km^{2})
- Elevation: 837 ft (255 m)

Population (2020)
  - Total: 760
  - Density: 95.1/sq mi (36.71/km^{2})
- Time zone: UTC-5 (Eastern (EST))
  - Summer (DST): UTC-4 (EDT)
- ZIP code: 41553
- Area code: 606
- FIPS code: 21-60600
- GNIS feature ID: 0508814

Phelps is a census-designated place (CDP) in Pike County, Kentucky, United States. As of the 2020 census, Phelps had a population of 760. It is the easternmost census-designated community in Kentucky.

== Geography ==
Phelps is located at 37°30′50″N 82°9′14″W (37.513969, -82.153987).

According to the United States Census Bureau, the CDP has a total area of 8.9 square miles (23 km^{2}), all land.

== Demographics ==
Historical population
Census	Pop.	Note	%±
2020	760		—
U.S. Decennial Census

At the 2000 census there were 1,053 people, 423 households, and 321 families living in the CDP. The population density was 117.9 inhabitants per square mile (45.5/km^{2}). There were 491 housing units at an average density of 55.0 per square mile (21.2/km^{2}). The racial makeup of the CDP was 99.15% White, 0.19% African American, and 0.66% from two or more races. Hispanic or Latino of any race were 0.47%.

Of the 423 households 32.2% had children under the age of 18 living with them, 61.9% were married couples living together, 10.9% had a female householder with no husband present, and 23.9% were non-families. 22.0% of households were one person and 7.6% were one person aged 65 or older. The average household size was 2.49 and the average family size was 2.90.

The age distribution was 23.6% under the age of 18, 8.0% from 18 to 24, 29.2% from 25 to 44, 27.1% from 45 to 64, and 12.3% 65 or older. The median age was 37 years. For every 100 females, there were 101.3 males. For every 100 females age 18 and over, there were 93.0 males.

The median household income was $23,125 and the median family income was $23,472. Males had a median income of $35,313 versus $25,132 for females. The per capita income for the CDP was $10,365. About 34.8% of families and 36.2% of the population were below the poverty line, including 52.0% of those under age 18 and 7.4% of those age 65 or over.

== Education ==
Phelps has a lending library, a branch of the Pike County Public Library, Elementary School, and High School.
