= Pike County, Kentucky =

County in Kentucky, United States

- County
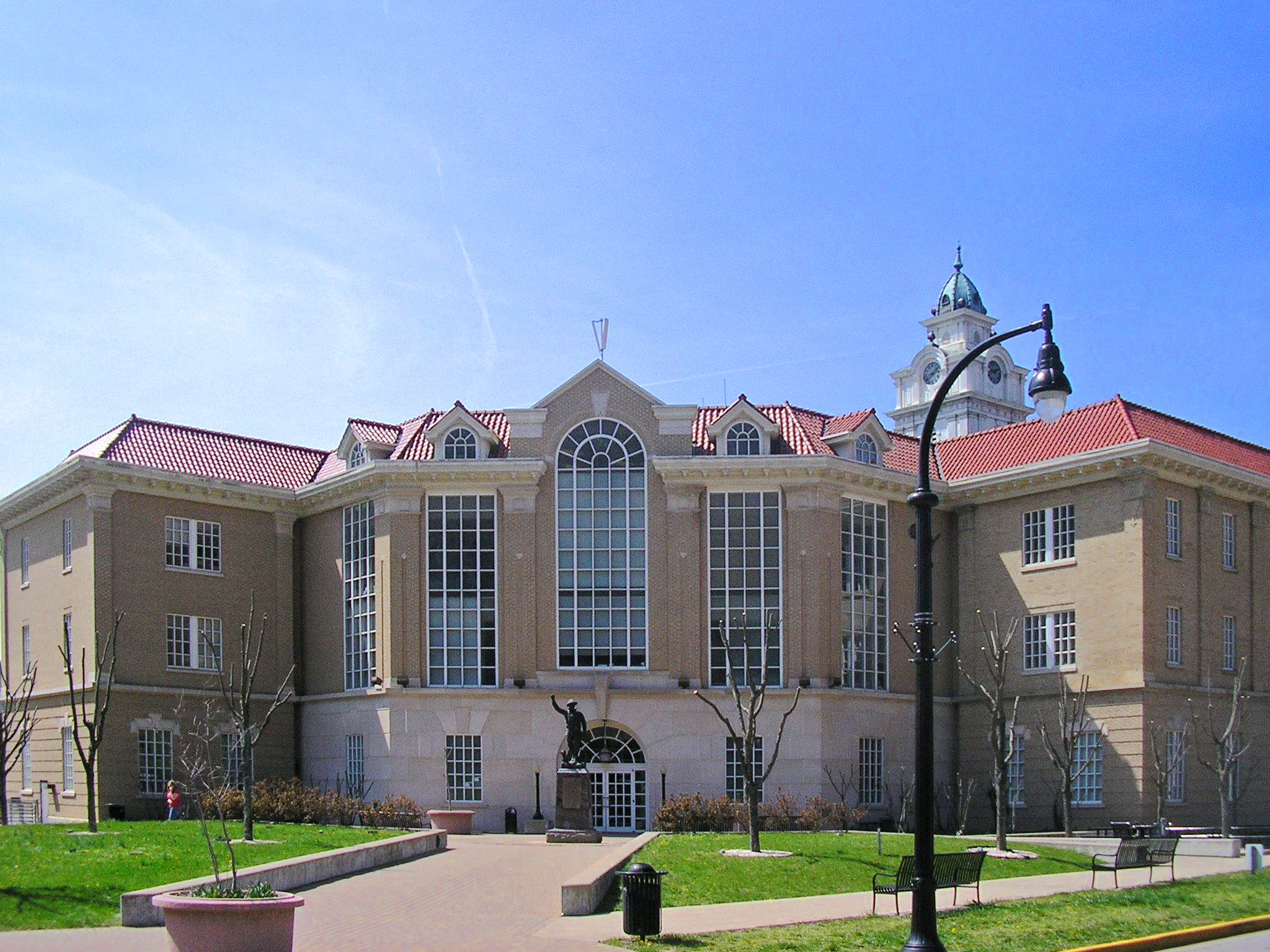
- Pike County courthouse in Pikeville

- Flag Seal

- Location within the U.S. state of Kentucky
- Coordinates: 37°28′08″N 82°23′45″W
- Country: United States
- State: Kentucky
- Founded: December 19, 1821
- Named for: Zebulon Pike
- Seat: Pikeville
- Largest city: Pikeville

Government
  - Judge/Executive: Ray Jones II (D)

Area
  - Total: 789 sq mi (2,040 km^{2})
  - Land: 787 sq mi (2,040 km^{2})
  - Water: 1.8 sq mi (4.7 km^{2}) 0.2%

Population (2020)
  - Total: 58,669
  - Estimate (2025): 54,721 ▼
  - Density: 74.5/sq mi (28.8/km^{2})
- Time zone: UTC−5 (Eastern)
  - Summer (DST): UTC−4 (EDT)
- Congressional district: 5th
- Website: www.pikecountyky.gov

Pike County is the easternmost county in the U.S. state of Kentucky. As of the 2020 Census, the population was 58,669. Its county seat is Pikeville. The county was founded in 1821. It is a moist county—a county in which alcohol sales are prohibited but which contains a "wet" city. In three of the county's cities—Pikeville, Elkhorn City, and Coal Run Village—package alcohol sales are legal.

== History ==
Pike County is Kentucky's easternmost county and its largest by land area. It is Kentucky's 11th most populous county, immediately preceded by Bullitt County and followed by Christian County. It is Kentucky's third largest banking center, with financial institutions and holding companies with more than $1 billion in assets. Between 1995 and 2000, personal income increased by 28%, and the county's per capita income exceeded the national and state average growth rates of the previous decade. Pike County is the 71st Kentucky county in order of creation.

Pike County was founded on December 19, 1821, from a portion of Floyd County. The county was named for General Zebulon Pike, the explorer who discovered Pikes Peak and became a national hero and namesake after his death in the War of 1812. Between 1860 and 1891 the Hatfield-McCoy feud raged in Pike and in bordering Logan County, West Virginia (now Mingo County). On May 6, 1893, Pikeville officially became a city and the county seat.

Pike County is also home to former governor of Kentucky Paul E. Patton.

The Appalachian News Express, published in Pikeville, is preserved on microfilm by the University of Kentucky Libraries. The microfilm holdings are listed in a master negative database on the university's Libraries Preservation and Digital Programs website.

== Geography ==
According to the United States Census Bureau, the county has an area of 789 square miles (2,040 km^{2}), of which 787 square miles (2,040 km^{2}) is land and 1.8 square miles (4.7 km^{2}) (0.2%) is water. It is Kentucky's largest county by area.

The county's population centers include Pikeville and its surrounding suburbs, Elkhorn City, and the unincorporated town of South Williamson.

=== Major highways ===
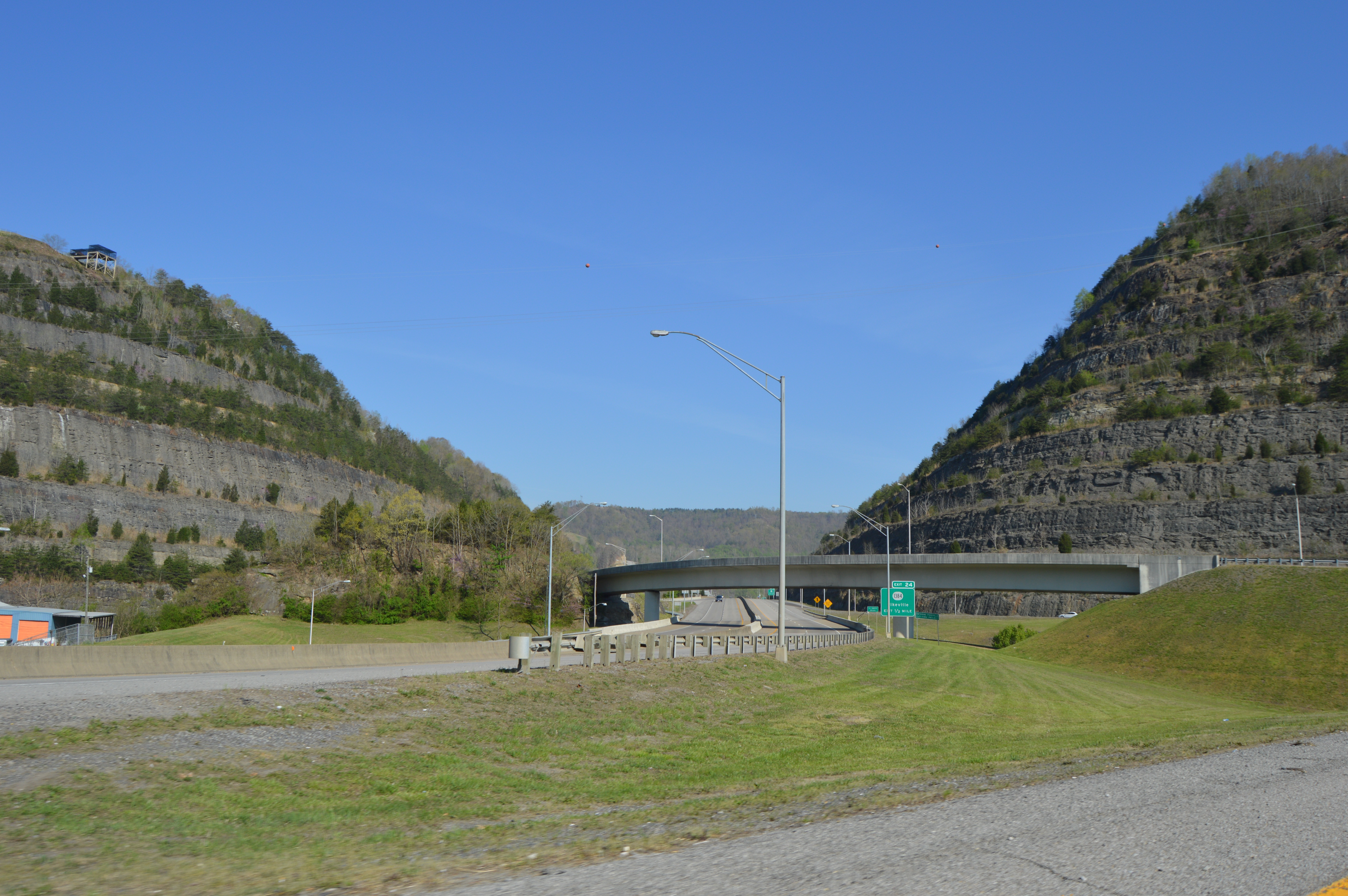
U.S. Route 23 passes through the Pikeville Cut-Through, the second largest earthmoving project in the Western Hemisphere.

Pike County has 486.285 miles of classified roads.

=== Adjacent counties ===
- Martin County (north)
- Mingo County, West Virginia (east)
- Buchanan County, Virginia (southeast)
- Dickenson County, Virginia (south)
- Wise County, Virginia (south)
- Letcher County (southwest)
- Knott County (southwest)
- Floyd County (west)
- McDowell County, West Virginia (far east) While not bordering the county directly it is only separated by a nearly 2-mile corridor of Buchanan County, Virginia

== Demographics ==
Historical population
Census	Pop.	Note	%±
1830	2,677		—
1840	3,567		33.2%
1850	5,365		50.4%
1860	7,384		37.6%
1870	9,562		29.5%
1880	13,001		36.0%
1890	17,378		33.7%
1900	22,686		30.5%
1910	31,679		39.6%
1920	49,477		56.2%
1930	63,267		27.9%
1940	71,122		12.4%
1950	81,154		14.1%
1960	68,264		−15.9%
1970	61,059		−10.6%
1980	81,123		32.9%
1990	72,583		−10.5%
2000	68,736		−5.3%
2010	65,024		−5.4%
2020	58,669		−9.8%
2025 (est.)	54,721	▼	−6.7%
U.S. Decennial Census; 1790–1960 1900–1990; 1990–2000 2010–2020

=== 2020 census ===
As of the 2020 census, the county had a population of 58,669. The median age was 43.5 years. 20.6% of residents were under the age of 18 and 19.0% of residents were 65 years of age or older. For every 100 females there were 95.8 males, and for every 100 females age 18 and over there were 94.3 males age 18 and over.

The racial makeup of the county was 95.4% White, 0.8% Black or African American, 0.1% American Indian and Alaska Native, 0.6% Asian, 0.0% Native Hawaiian and Pacific Islander, 0.4% from some other race, and 2.5% from two or more races. Hispanic or Latino residents of any race comprised 1.2% of the population.

15.2% of residents lived in urban areas, while 84.8% lived in rural areas.

There were 24,534 households in the county, of which 27.5% had children under the age of 18 living with them and 29.4% had a female householder with no spouse or partner present. About 31.1% of all households were made up of individuals and 13.5% had someone living alone who was 65 years of age or older.

There were 28,693 housing units, of which 14.5% were vacant. Among occupied housing units, 72.0% were owner-occupied and 28.0% were renter-occupied. The homeowner vacancy rate was 1.7% and the rental vacancy rate was 9.4%.

=== 2000 census ===
As of the census of 2000, there were 68,736 people, 27,612 households, and 20,377 families residing in the county. The population density was 87 per square mile (34/km^{2}). There were 30,923 housing units at an average density of 39 per square mile (15/km^{2}). The racial makeup of the county was 98.35% White, 0.45% Black or African American, 0.11% Native American, 0.41% Asian, 0.03% Pacific Islander, 0.10% from other races, and 0.56% from two or more races. 0.65% of the population were Hispanic or Latino of any race.

The largest self-reported ancestry groups in Pike County, Kentucky are:

- 18.2% "American"
- 16.1% English
- 13.1% Irish
- 6.7% German
- 2.3% Scots-Irish
- 1.3% Italian

There were 27,612 households, out of which 33.70% had children under the age of 18 living with them, 58.80% were married couples living together, 11.40% had a female householder with no husband present, and 26.20% were non-families. 24.10% of all households were made up of individuals, and 9.80% had someone living alone who was 65 years of age or older. The average household size was 2.46 and the average family size was 2.90.

The age distribution was 23.70% under the age of 18, 9.20% from 18 to 24, 30.00% from 25 to 44, 24.90% from 45 to 64, and 12.30% who were 65 years of age or older. The median age was 37 years. For every 100 females there were 95.50 males. For every 100 females age 18 and over, there were 91.20 males.

The median income for a household in the county was $23,930, and the median income for a family was $29,302. Males had a median income of $32,332 versus $19,229 for females. The per capita income for the county was $14,005. About 20.60% of families and 23.40% of the population were below the poverty line, including 30.20% of those under age 18 and 16.10% of those age 65 or over. The zip codes 41502 (Pikeville), 41503 (South Williamson), and 41527 (Forest Hills) are the wealthiest portions of the county. 41502 is the 50th wealthiest zip code in Kentucky, 41503 is the 61st wealthiest, and 41527 is the 63rd wealthiest. South Williamson and Forest Hills are located on the Northeast side of the county. These three areas combine to 2,129 residents and make up around 3% of the county's population. The average income for these areas are $51,962 (41502), $49,345 (41503), and $48,484 (41527).

== Politics ==
United States presidential election results for Pike County, Kentucky
Year	Republican		Democratic		Third party(ies)	
Year	No.	%	No.	%	No.	%
1912	2,777	44.85%	2,583	41.72%	832	13.44%
1916	4,212	54.71%	3,414	44.34%	73	0.95%
1920	7,911	58.08%	5,619	41.25%	92	0.68%
1924	7,059	52.13%	5,835	43.09%	646	4.77%
1928	9,386	54.14%	7,930	45.75%	19	0.11%
1932	7,914	38.28%	12,686	61.36%	74	0.36%
1936	8,210	41.88%	11,382	58.06%	11	0.06%
1940	8,985	42.46%	12,160	57.46%	16	0.08%
1944	8,092	45.21%	9,757	54.52%	48	0.27%
1948	8,097	40.97%	11,423	57.80%	244	1.23%
1952	9,778	43.31%	12,761	56.52%	37	0.16%
1956	11,678	50.37%	11,466	49.45%	41	0.18%
1960	9,956	43.30%	13,039	56.70%	0	0.00%
1964	7,078	33.30%	14,140	66.53%	35	0.16%
1968	8,911	39.56%	11,663	51.78%	1,952	8.67%
1972	12,535	56.46%	9,513	42.85%	152	0.68%
1976	9,178	38.74%	14,320	60.44%	193	0.81%
1980	10,550	41.02%	14,878	57.85%	292	1.14%
1984	11,869	42.68%	15,817	56.87%	126	0.45%
1988	9,976	37.76%	16,339	61.85%	101	0.38%
1992	8,212	29.24%	17,358	61.81%	2,512	8.95%
1996	7,160	30.47%	14,126	60.12%	2,209	9.40%
2000	11,005	44.13%	13,611	54.59%	319	1.28%
2004	12,611	47.11%	14,002	52.30%	157	0.59%
2008	12,655	55.89%	9,525	42.07%	463	2.04%
2012	17,590	74.42%	5,646	23.89%	400	1.69%
2016	19,747	80.06%	4,280	17.35%	638	2.59%
2020	20,284	79.87%	4,866	19.16%	245	0.96%
2024	19,684	82.19%	4,025	16.81%	241	1.01%

Pike County voted reliably Republican in presidential elections from 1896 to 1928 under the Fourth Party System, then Democratic in presidential elections from 1932 until 2004. Since 2008, it has shifted back to Republicans in presidential voting.

Local politics have been dominated by the Democratic Party throughout the county's history. Most local offices, including judge-executive, sheriff, and several representatives in the Kentucky House of Representatives remain Democratic. No Republicans ran in the last races for judge-executive and sheriff. In the 2022 midterm elections Pike County saw a "red wave" in which every incumbent county commissioner was ousted along with Democratic incumbent County Clerk Rhonda Taylor, Democratic incumbent County Attorney Kevin Keene, and Democratic incumbent State Representative Angie Hatton.

=== Local government ===
The office of Pike County Judge Executive served as a launching pad for the governorship of Paul E. Patton (1995–2003).

In 2016, Pike County voted to switch from a magisterial form of government to a commissioner form of government. As of 2019, the Pike County Fiscal Court is composed of three county commissioners and the county judge/executive. This was a bipartisan effort led by a citizens' group, Pike Countians Against Government Waste, that garnered signature petitions in 2015–16 to place the question on the ballot. In 2016, nearly 70% of voters supported changing to a commissioner form of government. In March 2017, the fiscal court, composed of six magistrates and a judge-executive, voted unanimously to sue the judge-executive (who voted to sue himself) to overturn the results of the ballot question to change the form of government. The fiscal court, composed of magistrates Jeff Anderson, Vernon "Chick" Johnson, Leo Murphy, Hilman Dotson, and Bobby Varney and Judge Bill Deskins, was first represented by Assistant County Attorney John Doug Hays and then by County Attorney Howard Keith Hall. The citizens' group was represented by State Senator Ray Jones II, who filed a motion to intervene on behalf of the citizens of Pike County. In October 2017, Special Judge Rebecca Phillips of Morgan County dismissed the lawsuit in a 23-page decision, which effectively ended the effort to overturn the voters' decision. The commissioner form of government replaced the magistrate form in 2019.

=== Elected officials ===
Elected officials as of January 3, 2025
U.S. House	Hal Rogers (R)	KY 5
Ky. Senate	Phillip Wheeler (R)	31
Ky. House	John Blanton (R)	92
Ky. House	Mitch Whitaker (R)	94
Ky. House	Ashley Tackett Laferty (D)	95
Ky. House	Bobby McCool (R)	97

== Economy ==
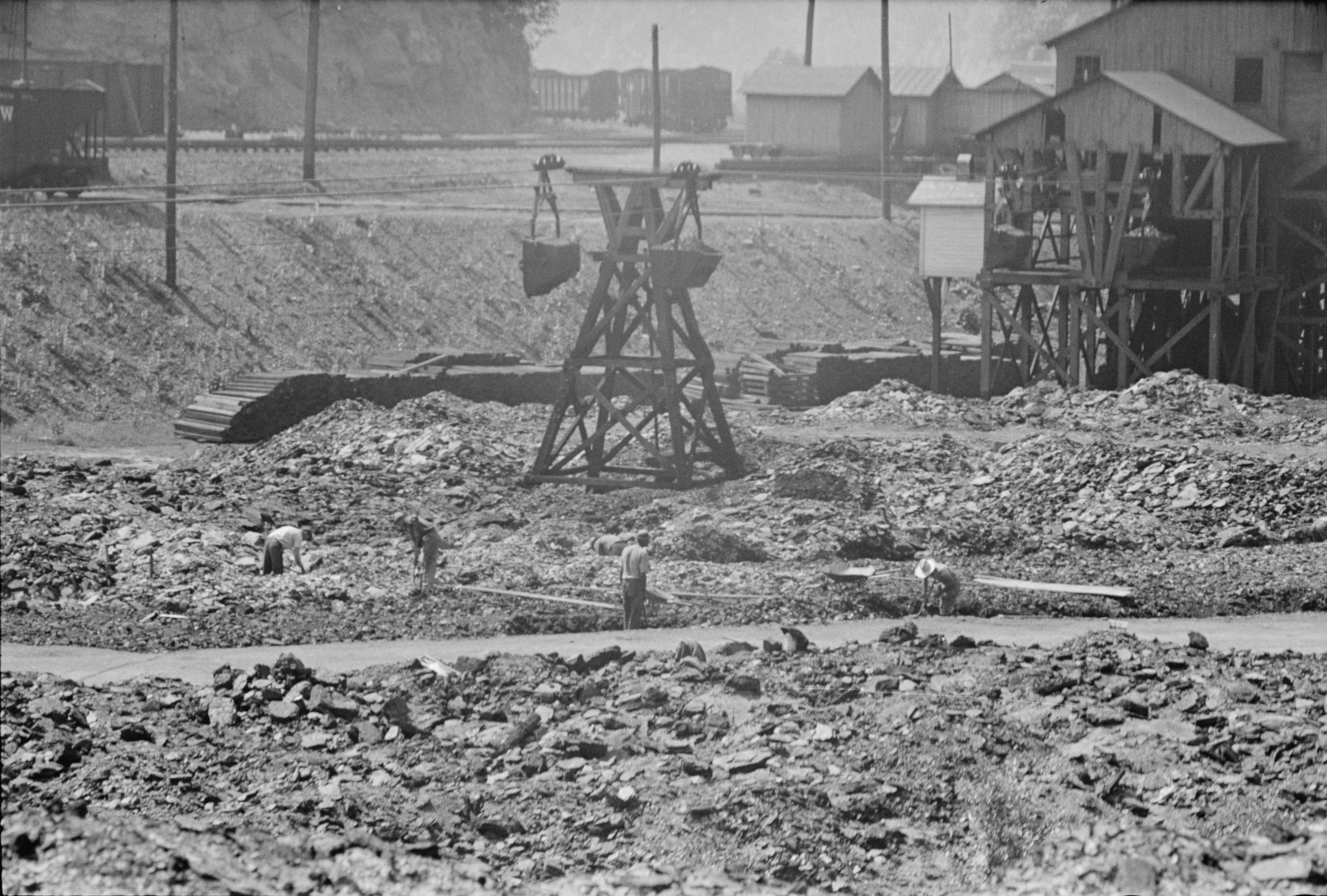
A coal breaker in Pike County in 1938

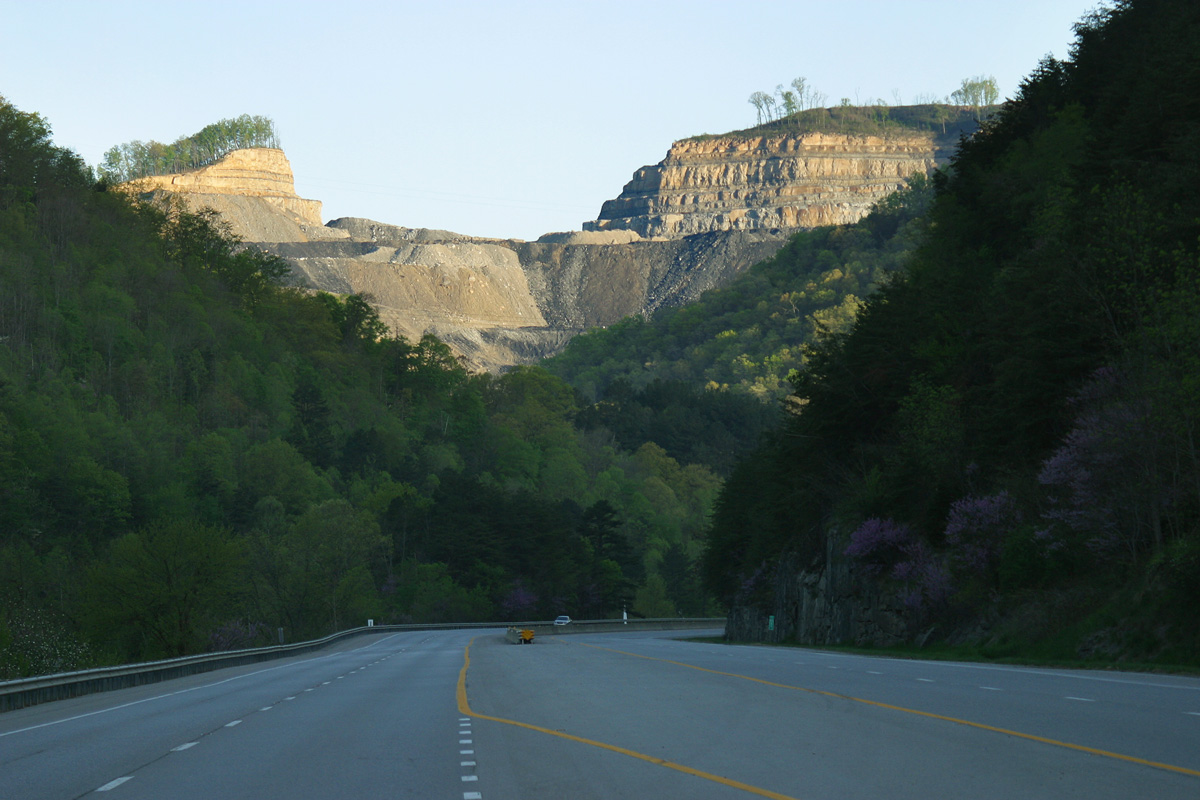
A mountaintop removal mine just off of U.S. Route 23 in 2010

Pike County has vast fossil fuel, (coal and natural gas) reserves. It is one of the nation's leading coal and natural gas producers. In April 2007, Pike County announced the first-in-the-nation comprehensive energy strategy developed in partnership with the Southern States Energy Board.

As of 2013 Pike County was Kentucky's second-largest coal producing county, after Union County. Including Harlan County, Perry County, and Martin County, Eastern Kentucky produces nearly 3/4 of all coal produced in the state. Over 150 million tons are produced annually in the state.

The poverty level of counties in the Appalachian region of Kentucky is 24.4%, as compared to the United States Poverty Level of 12.4%. Of the top eight coal-producing counties in eastern Kentucky, Pike County is the only one that does not have a higher poverty rate than Appalachian Kentucky as a whole.

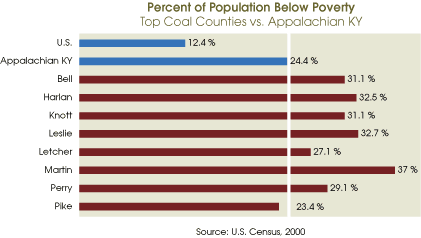

=== Coal companies in Pike County ===
- Alliance Resource Partners
- Alpha Natural Resources
- James River Coal Company
- Rhino Resource Partners
- TECO Coal

=== Economic growth ===
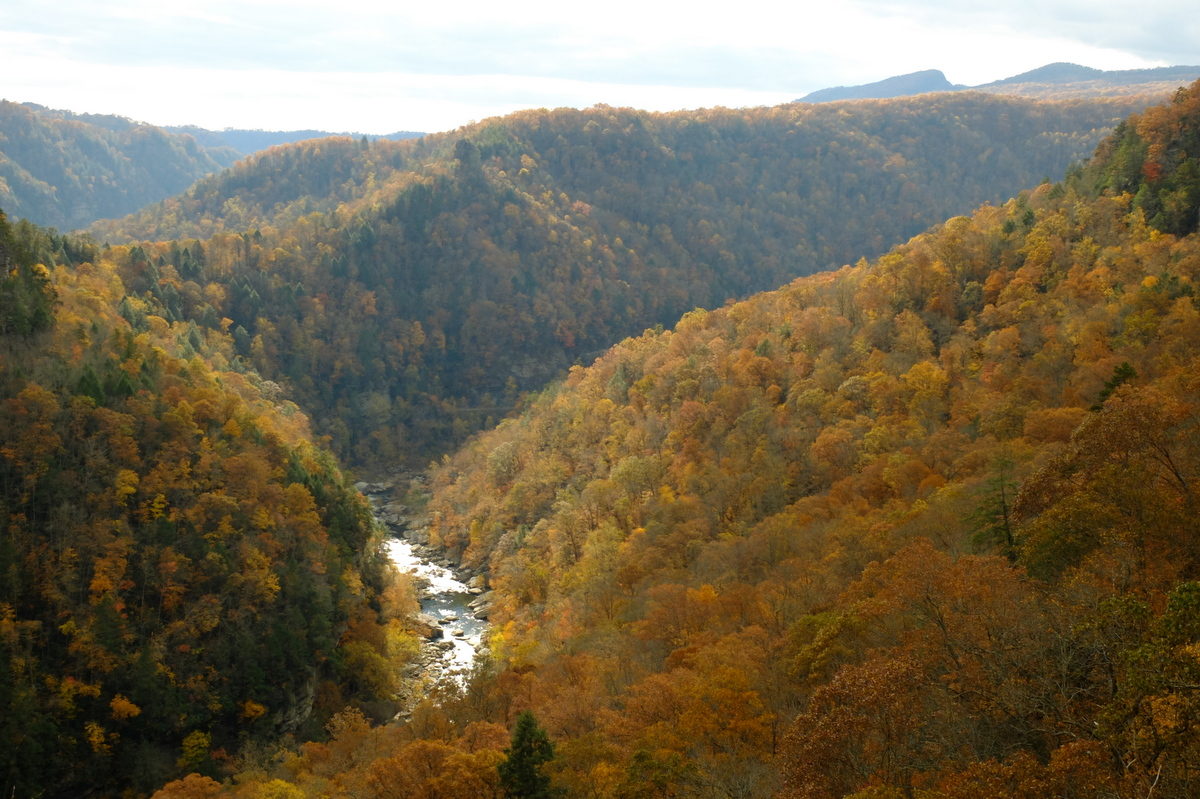
Tourism is also a major component of the economy in Pike County. In 2012, nearly 300,000 people visited the Breaks Interstate Park on the Kentucky-Virginia border.

Over 1,400 businesses exist in Pikeville. From 2005 to 2011, downtown Pikeville experienced major growth. The Eastern Kentucky Exposition Center was constructed in 2005 and seats 7,000. It features numerous events, such as concerts and shows. The county is also home to the Pikeville Concert Association, which secures events that usually take place at the University of Pikeville's Booth Auditorium.

In 2010, the Pikeville Medical Center received a $44 million loan from the U.S. Department of Agriculture Rural Development program to construct an 11-story office building and adjacent parking garage downtown. Construction was completed in 2014.

The University of Pikeville broke ground on a nine-story building (the Coal Building) on Hambley Boulevard in downtown Pikeville in early 2011 to house the University of Pikeville's School of Osteopathic Medicine.

In 2011, Jenny Wiley Theatre group announced its collaboration with the city of Pikeville to construct a 200-seat indoor professional theater in downtown Pikeville. The theatre opened in 2014.

== Healthcare ==
=== Hospitals ===
- Pikeville Medical Center, Pikeville, Kentucky
- Appalachian Regional Healthcare, South Williamson, Kentucky

== Education ==
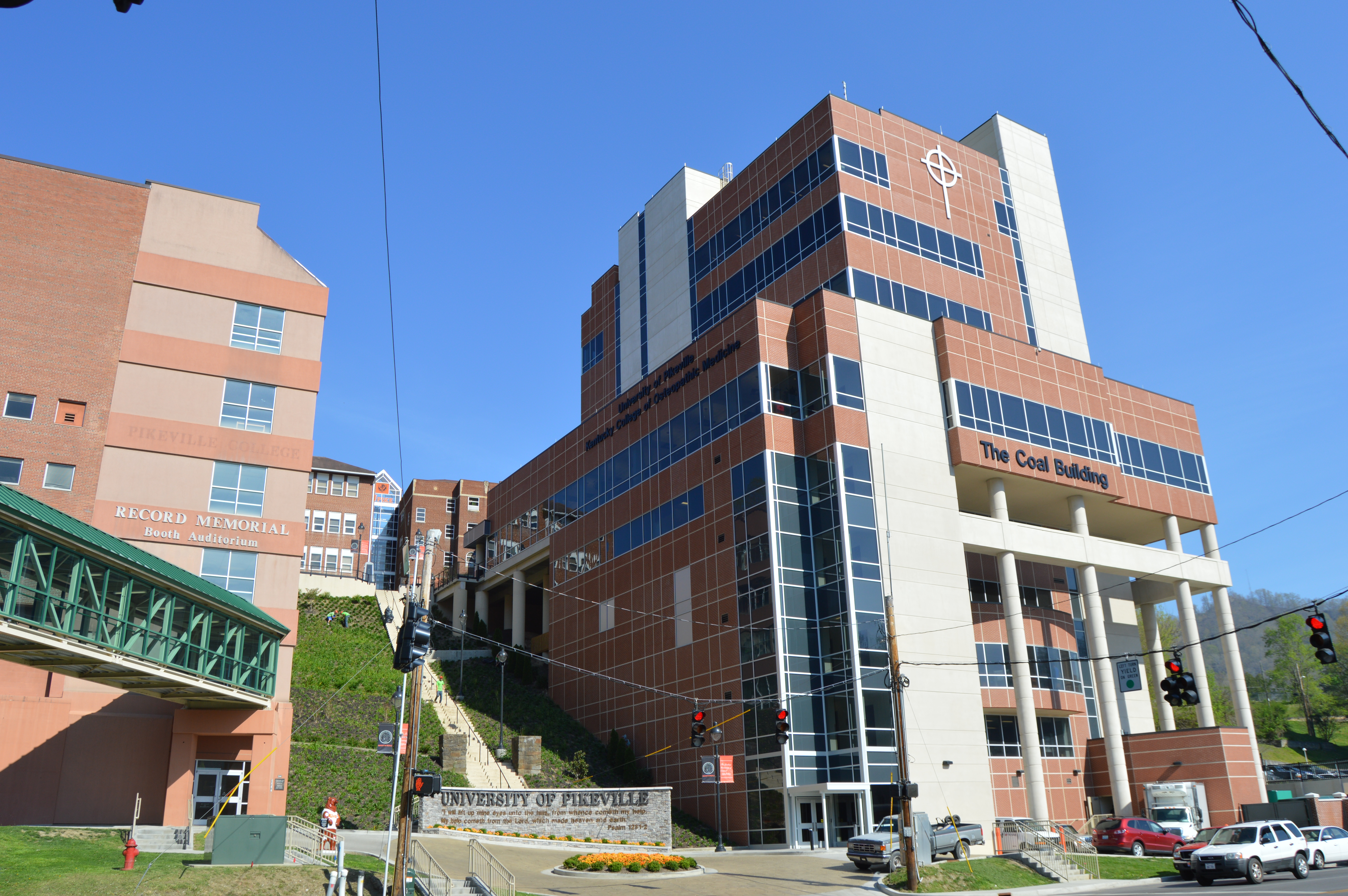
University of Pikeville

=== Pike County colleges ===
- University of Pikeville (UPike), Pikeville, Kentucky
- Big Sandy Community and Technical College Pikeville Campus
- Galen College of Nursing Pikeville Campus

=== Pike County Schools ===
The Pike County School System consists of 25 high, middle, and elementary schools.

==== High schools ====
- Belfry High School, Belfry, Kentucky
- East Ridge High School, Lick Creek, Kentucky
- Phelps High School, Phelps, Kentucky
- Pike County Central High School, Pikeville, Kentucky
- Shelby Valley High School, Pikeville, Kentucky

==== Middle and elementary schools ====
The following lists of middle and elementary schools are categorized by the high school they feed:

- Belfry High School System
  - Belfry Middle School
    - Bevins Elementary
    - Belfry Elementary
- East Ridge High School System
  - Elkhorn City Elementary School
  - Feds Creek Elementary School
  - Millard Elementary School
- Phelps High School System
  - Phelps Elementary School
- Pike County Central High School System
  - Johns Creek Elementary School
  - Kimper Elementary School
  - Mullins School
- Shelby Valley High School System
  - Dorton School
  - Valley Elementary School

Shelby Valley Day Treatment Center, Phelps Day Treatment Center, are all discipline facilities. Northpoint Academy is a high school dropout prevention program that focuses on the students' individual needs. All Northpoint students are there voluntarily.

==== Pikeville Independent Schools ====
- High School
  - Pikeville High School, Pikeville
- Elementary School
  - Pikeville Elementary School

=== Private schools ===
- St. Francis of Assisi Pikeville, Kentucky
- Christ Central Pikeville, Kentucky

== Sports ==
=== Baseball ===
Pike County has had several minor league teams based out of Pikeville. In 1982 the Pikeville Brewers were located in the city. They were part of the Appalachian League and affiliated with the Milwaukee Brewers. In 1983 the team became affiliated with the Chicago Cubs and changed its name to the Pikeville Cubs. In 2010 Pikeville Independent's baseball team finished in the final four at the KHSAA Baseball State Tournament. In 2012 and 2013 Pikeville Junior High baseball finished second in the Kentucky Middle School State Tournament.

=== Basketball ===
In 2007, the East Kentucky Miners came to Pike County after the Eastern Kentucky Exposition Center opened. The team played in Pikeville from 2007 to 2010. In 2010, the American Basketball Association opened an expansion franchise in Pikeville called the East Kentucky Energy. In 2010, Shelby Valley High School won the KHSAA Men's Basketball State Championship. In 2011, UPike Men's Basketball won the national championship, defeating Mountain State University.

=== Football ===
In 2010, it was announced that the Pike County Crusaders, an Indoor Arena Football team, were coming to the Eastern Kentucky Expo Center, but the initiative failed. In 2011, The East Kentucky Drillers, an Indoor Arena Football franchise, came to the Eastern Kentucky Expo Center. In 2012, the team changed its name to the Kentucky Drillers.

Club	Sport	Years Active	League	Venue
East Kentucky Drillers	Indoor Arena Football	2011–2012	UIFL	Eastern Kentucky Expo Center
East Kentucky Energy	Basketball	2010–2012	ABA	Eastern Kentucky Expo Center
East Kentucky Miners	Basketball	2007–2010	ABA	Eastern Kentucky Expo Center
Kentucky Drillers	Indoor Arena Football	2012–2013	CIFL	Eastern Kentucky Expo Center
Pikeville Brewers	Baseball	1982	Appalachian League	Davis Park
Pikeville Cubs	Baseball	1983–1984	Appalachian League	Davis Park

== Communities ==
=== Cities ===
- Coal Run Village
- Elkhorn City
- Pikeville (county seat)

=== Census-designated places ===
- Belfry
- Freeburn
- McCarr
- Phelps
- South Williamson
- Virgie

=== Other unincorporated places ===
- Ashcamp
- Beefhide (partial)
- Belcher
- Broad Bottom
- Canada
- Cedarville
- Dorton
- Fedscreek
- Fords Branch
- Garden Village
- Hellier
- Jonancy
- Kimper
- Lick Creek
- Mouthcard
- Phyllis
- Raccoon
- Shelbiana
- Sidney
- Steele
- Stone
- Stopover
- Varney

== Notable people ==
- Woody Blackburn – professional golfer
- Charles Blevins, a West Virginia folk music artist and the owner of Red Robin Inn, in Borderland, West Virginia.
- Stephen Cochran – country music singer and songwriter
- Robert Damron – professional golfer
- Patty Loveless, born Ramey – country music singer
- Paul E. Patton – former Governor of Kentucky
- Mark Reynolds – professional baseball player
- Jonny Venters – professional baseball player
- Warner Wolf – sports journalist
- Dwight Yoakam – country music singer and songwriter
- Randolph McCoy- leader involved in the Hatfield McCoy feud
- Katherine G. Langley - first female member of Congress from Kentucky
- Mary Elliott Flanery - first female member of KY House of Representative
- Josh Osborne - country music songwriter
- Ryan Hall Y’all - Ryan Hall, “The Internet’s Weatherman”
- Pearl Frances Runyon - former Kentucky State Treasurer

== See also ==
- Big Sandy Area Development District
- Breaks Interstate Park
- Elkhorn City Railroad Museum
- Fishtrap Lake State Park
- Jefferson National Forest
- National Register of Historic Places listings in Pike County, Kentucky
- Pikeville Cut-Through
