= River, Kentucky =

Unincorporated community in Kentucky, United States

- Unincorporated community
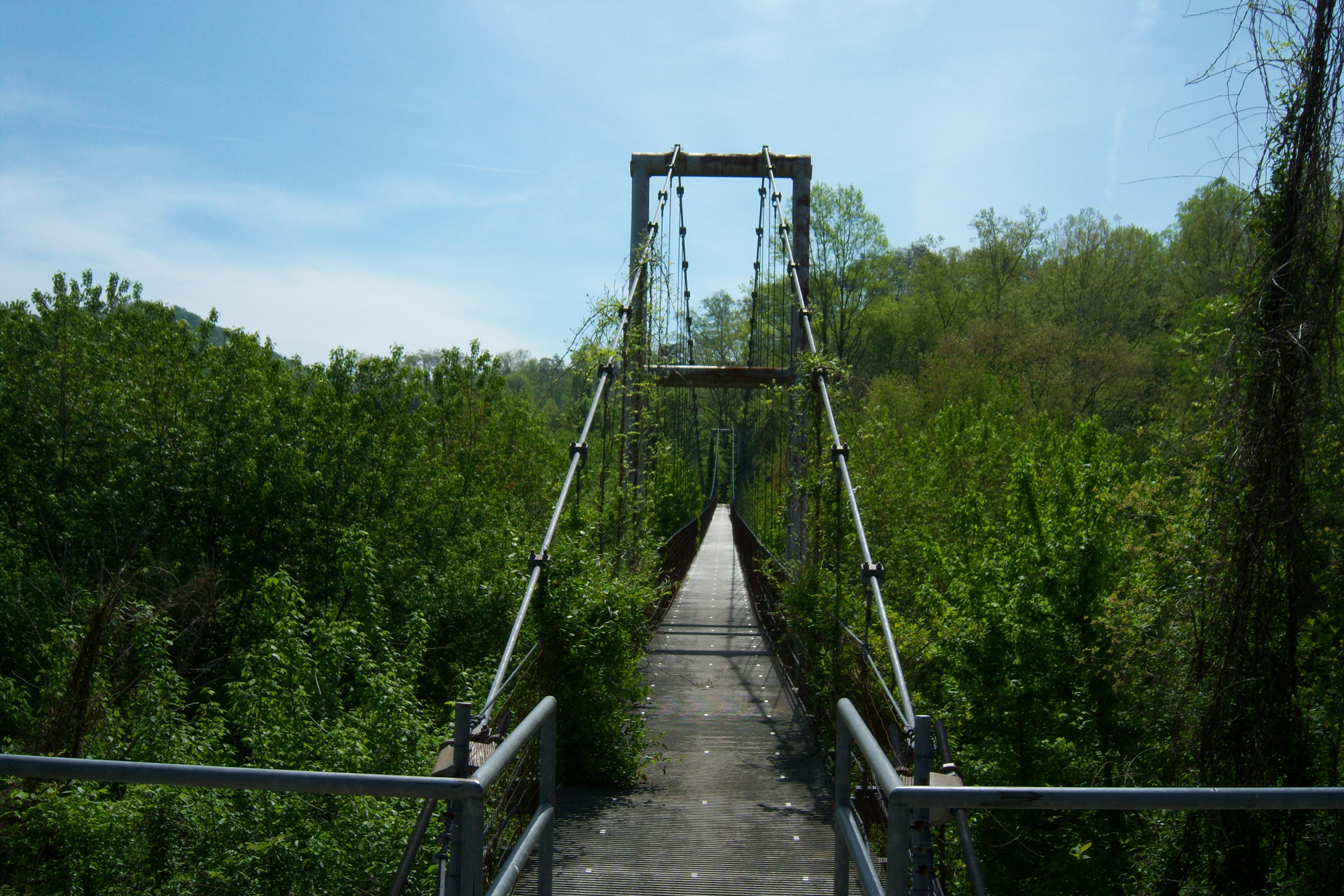
- The Forrest and Maxie Preston Memorial Bridge

- Location within Kentucky Location within the United States
- Coordinates: 37°51′39.57″N 82°43′34.43″W
- Country: United States
- State: Kentucky
- County: Johnson
- Elevation: 633 ft (193 m)
- Time zone: UTC-5 (Eastern (EST))
  - Summer (DST): UTC-5 (EDT)
- ZIP code: 41254
- Area code: 606
- GNIS feature ID: 501977

River is an unincorporated community in Johnson County, Kentucky, United States. The post office was first established on September 6, 1890, and its current ZIP code is 41254. Its telephone area code is 606. Its geographic coordinates are (37.86102 N, 82.72623 W).

== History ==
A post office called River has been in operation since 1890. The community took its name from the nearby river.

== Trivia ==
In 1999, the community of River received international attention for having the world's longest "plastic" bridge. The wooden deck of the 420-foot-long (130 m) Forrest and Maxie Preston Memorial Bridge was replaced with a deck made of glass fiber-reinforced polymer composites. The bridge is 30 feet longer than Aberfeldy Bridge in Scotland, which was the former recordholder. The bridge spans the Levisa Fork and connects River to the community of Offutt.

River is also noted as the birthplace of country music star Hylo Brown and is the burial site of legendary pioneer, Jenny Wiley.

== Nearby cities and towns ==
- Beauty, Kentucky (9.4 miles)
- Boonscamp, Kentucky (4.0 miles)
- Crum, West Virginia (10.8 miles)
- Debord, Kentucky (7.0 miles)
- Inez, Kentucky (7.1 miles)
- Lowmansville, Kentucky (8.9 miles)
- Meally, Kentucky (7.2 miles)
- Paintsville, Kentucky (5.8 miles)
- Pilgrim, Kentucky (12.4 miles)
- Stambaugh, Kentucky (8.9 miles)
- Thelma, Kentucky (7.7 miles)
- Tomahawk, Kentucky (1.9 miles)
- Tutor Key, Kentucky (6.4 miles)
- Ulysses, Kentucky (6.1 miles)
- Van Lear, Kentucky (9.0 miles)
- West Van Lear, Kentucky (9.9 miles)
- Williamsport, Kentucky (5.9 miles)
