= Kentucky Route 581 =

State highway in Kentucky, United States

Kentucky Route 581
- KY 581 highlighted in red

Route information
- Maintained by KYTC
- Length: 20.893 mi (33.624 km)

Major junctions
- South end: KY 40 in Paintsville
- KY 645 near Richardson
- North end: US 23 near Georges Creek

Location
- Country: United States
- State: Kentucky
- Counties: Johnson, Lawrence

Highway system
- Kentucky State Highway System; Interstate; US; State; Parkways
← KY 580	→ KY 582

Kentucky Route 581 (KY 581) is a 20.893-mile-long (33.624 km) state highway in Kentucky that runs from Kentucky Route 40 in eastern Paintsville to U.S. Route 23 southwest of Georges Creek via Thealka, Tutor Key, Lost Creek, and Ray.

== Major intersections ==
County	Location	mi	km	Destinations	Notes
Johnson	Paintsville	0.000	0.000	KY 40 (Euclid Avenue)	Southern terminus
Johnson		3.835	6.172	KY 993 north	Southern terminus of KY 993
Johnson		6.776	10.905	To KY 3224 (Wiley Branch Road)	
Lawrence		16.403	26.398	KY 645	
Lawrence		20.893	33.624	US 23	Northern terminus
1.000 mi = 1.609 km; 1.000 km = 0.621 mi
