= Kentucky Route 40 =

State highway in Kentucky, United States

Kentucky Route 40
- KY 40 highlighted in red

Route information
- Maintained by KYTC
- Length: 42.339 mi (68.138 km)

Major junctions
- West end: US 460 / KY 7 in Salyersville
- East end: Virginia Avenue in Kermit, WV

Location
- Country: United States
- State: Kentucky
- Counties: Magoffin, Johnson, Martin

Highway system
- Kentucky State Highway System; Interstate; US; State; Parkways
← KY 39	→ US 41

Kentucky Route 40 (KY 40) is a 42.339-mile-long (68.138 km) state highway in the U.S. state of Kentucky. The highway begins at an intersection with US 460/KY 7 in Salyersville, within Magoffin County, then continues eastward through Paintsville, within Johnson County. KY 40 ends in Martin County at an intersection with KY 292 and an access bridge to US 52 at the West Virginia state line.

== History ==
KY 40 originally extended west to Frankfort. US 460 replaced the entire route west of Paintsville in the 1940s. Around 1980, it was moved onto a new alignment east of Salyersville, and KY 40 was extended back west.

== Major intersections ==
County	Location	mi	km	Destinations	Notes
Magoffin	Salyersville	0.000	0.000	US 460 (South Church Street/West Maple Street) / KY 7 to Mountain Parkway – West Liberty, Paintsville	
Magoffin	Salyersville	1.110	1.786	KY 2020 east (Mashfork Road)	Western terminus of KY 2020
Magoffin	Falcon	4.567	7.350	KY 1081 west (Mine Fork Road)	Eastern terminus of KY 1081
Magoffin		6.438	10.361	KY 1437 north (Litteral Fork Road)	Southern terminus of KY 1437
Johnson		7.874	12.672	KY 825 east	Eastern terminus of KY 825
Johnson	Oil Springs	8.473	13.636	KY 580 east	Western end of KY 580 overlap
Johnson		8.614	13.863	KY 580 west	Eastern end of KY 580 overlap
Johnson	Barnetts Creek	12.046	19.386	KY 580 west – Paintsville Lake State Park	Eastern terminus of KY 580
Johnson		13.407	21.576	KY 2275 west – Paintsville Lake State Park	Eastern terminus of KY 2275
Johnson		13.460	21.662	KY 172 west – Flat Gap, Sandy Hook	Eastern terminus of KY 172
Johnson	Paintsville	14.880	23.947	US 23 north – Ashland	Interchange; only northbound 23 can be accessed from 40 - the ramp to southbound 23 is off 460
Johnson	Paintsville	15.014	24.163	US 460 west to US 23 south / US 460 east – Salyersville, Prestonsburg, Louisa	
Johnson	Paintsville	15.459	24.879	KY 321	
Johnson	Paintsville	16.831	27.087	KY 321 Bus. south (College Street)	Eastern terminus of KY 321 Bus.
Johnson	Paintsville	17.454	28.089	KY 1428 south (Depot Road)	Northern terminus of KY 1428
Johnson	Paintsville	17.473	28.120	KY 581 north – Jenny Wiley Grave, Johnson County Thealka Park	Southern terminus of KY 581
Johnson	Paintsville	17.812	28.666	KY 3388 south (Ponderosa Drive)	Northern terminus of KY 3388
Johnson	Paintsville	18.744	30.166	KY 1107 south – Van Lear	Western end of KY 1107 overlap
Johnson		19.277	31.023	KY 1145 south – Woodland Estates	
Johnson		19.469	31.332	KY 1107 north (Main Street)	Eastern end of KY 1107 overlap
Johnson	Meally	20.312	32.689	KY 3389 south (Dicey Branch)	Northern terminus of KY 3389
Johnson		25.156	40.485	KY 2040 north – Offutt	Southern terminus of KY 2040
Johnson	Boons Camp	26.716	42.995	KY 1596 south (Greasy Creek Road)	Northern terminus of KY 1596
Johnson		28.858	46.442	KY 3390 north – Whitehouse, Chestnut	Southern terminus of KY 3390
Martin	Tomahawk	34.359	55.295	KY 1224 south (Rockhouse Road)	Northern terminus of KY 1224
Martin	Stidham	35.909	57.790	KY 1884 north (Milo Road)	Southern terminus of KY 1884
Martin		38.175	61.437	KY 645 – Paintsville, Louisa, Prestonsburg	
Martin	Inez	39.219	63.117	KY 3 north (Rockcastle Road) – Clifford, Louisa	Western end of KY 3 overlap
Martin	Inez	39.379	63.374	KY 3 south (Holy Street)	Eastern end of KY 3 overlap
Martin	Inez	39.869	64.163	KY 908 north (Turkey Creek Road)	Western end of KY 908 overlap
Martin		40.905	65.830	KY 645 west	Interchange
Martin		40.939	65.885	KY 908 south (Coldwater Road)	Eastern end of KY 908 overlap
Martin		44.499	71.614	KY 2032 south (Little Rockcastle Road)	Northern terminus of KY 2032
Martin	Beauty	47.265	76.066	KY 2031 north (Big Elk Road)	Southern terminus of KY 2031
Martin	Warfield	48.535	78.110	KY 292 north (Riverfront Road)	Western end of KY 292 overlap
Martin		49.245	79.252	KY 292 south	Eastern end of KY 292 overlap
Martin		49.270	79.292	Virginia Avenue - Kermit, WV	West Virginia state line (Kermit Bridge over Tug Fork)
1.000 mi = 1.609 km; 1.000 km = 0.621 mi: Concurrency terminus

== Popular culture ==
The highway is the subject of the Ricky Skaggs song "Highway 40 Blues." According to songwriter Larry Cordle, "A lot of people who hear it think it's about Interstate 40, which runs right through Nashville, but I actually wrote it about that little state highway in Kentucky."
