= Thealka, Kentucky =

Unincorporated community in Kentucky, United States

- Unincorporated community
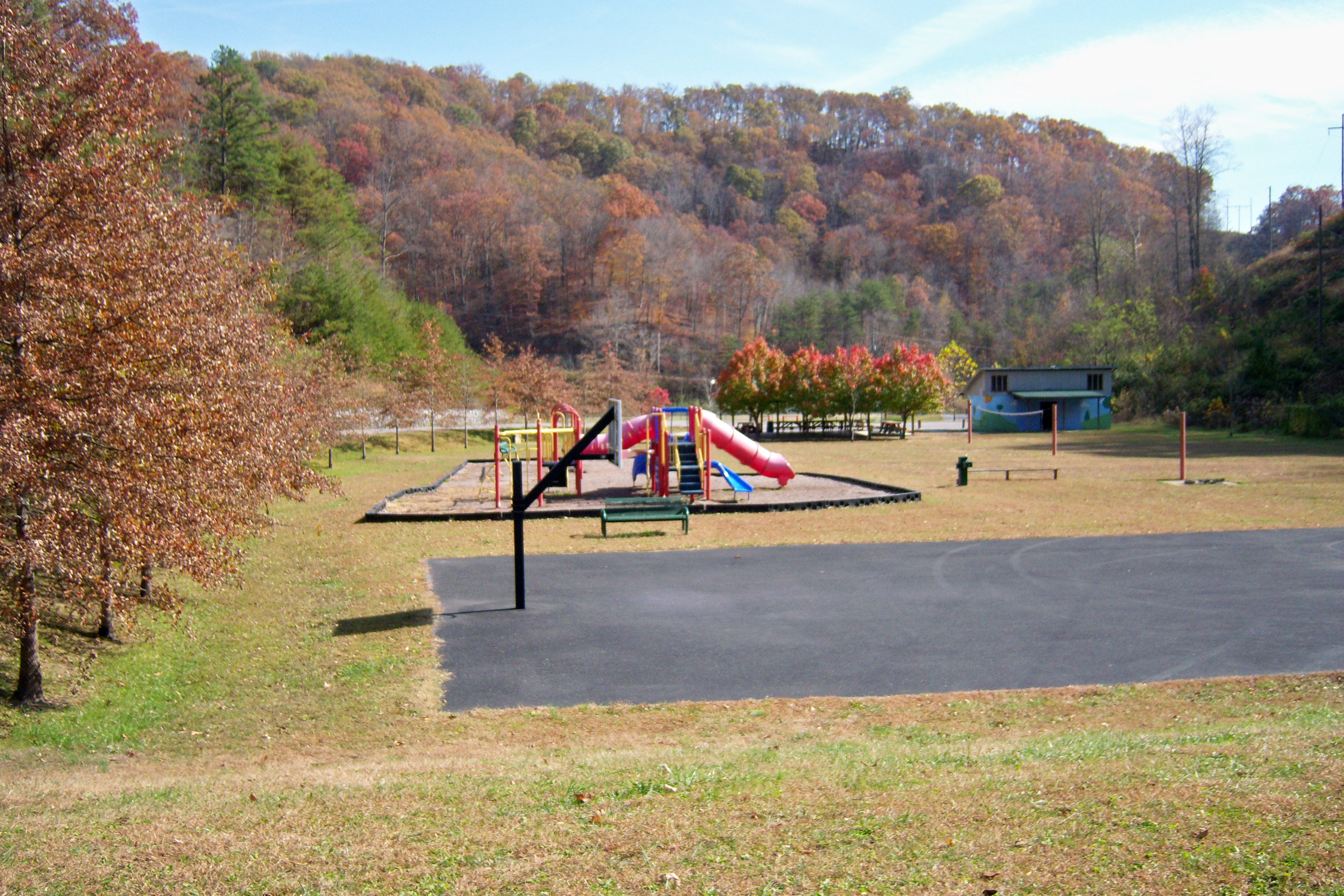
- Thealka Park

- Location within Kentucky Location within the United States
- Coordinates: 37°49′19″N 82°47′20″W
- Country: United States
- State: Kentucky
- County: Johnson
- Elevation: 620 ft (190 m)
- Time zone: UTC-5 (Eastern (EST))
  - Summer (DST): UTC-4 (EDT)
- ZIP code: 41240
- GNIS feature ID: 509201

Thealka is an unincorporated community in Johnson County, Kentucky, United States. It was created by the North East Coal Company in 1906.and was originally called Muddy Branch. In 1911, it was renamed "Thealka" after the steamboat known by the same name. Both the community and the steamboat were named after John C.C. Mayo's wife, Alice Jane Mayo, who was given the nickname "Alka". Thealka is in the 41240 ZIP Code Tabulation Area, which includes the nearby city of Paintsville.

== Geography ==
Thealka has an elevation of 620 feet (190 m) above sea level.

== Education ==
Most students residing in Thealka attend:

- W.R. Castle Elementary School in Wittensville (kindergarten-sixth grade)
- Johnson County Middle School in Paintsville (seventh-eighth grade)
- Johnson Central High School in Paintsville (ninth-twelfth grade)

== Attractions ==
Thealka boasts Johnson County Park and Recreational Area, more commonly known as Thealka Park. The park features a playground, an outdoor basketball court, an outdoor volleyball court, walking trails, two baseball fields, and two picnic shelters.
