= Elna =

Elna, ELNA o Elne may refer to:

== Geography ==
- Elna, California, a ghost town in California, US
- Elna, Kentucky, an unincorporated community in Johnson County, Kentucky, US
- Elne, a town in the Pyrénées-Orientales department in southern France

== Industry ==
- Elna (Swiss company), a Swiss manufacturer of sewing machines
- Elna (Japanese company), a Japanese electronics company

== Other ==
- Elna (name), a female name
- Esperanto-USA, formally Esperanto League of North America
- Exercito de Libertafao Nacional de Angola, armed wing of the National Liberation Front of Angola
