= Tutor Key, Kentucky =

Unincorporated community in Kentucky, United States

- Unincorporated community
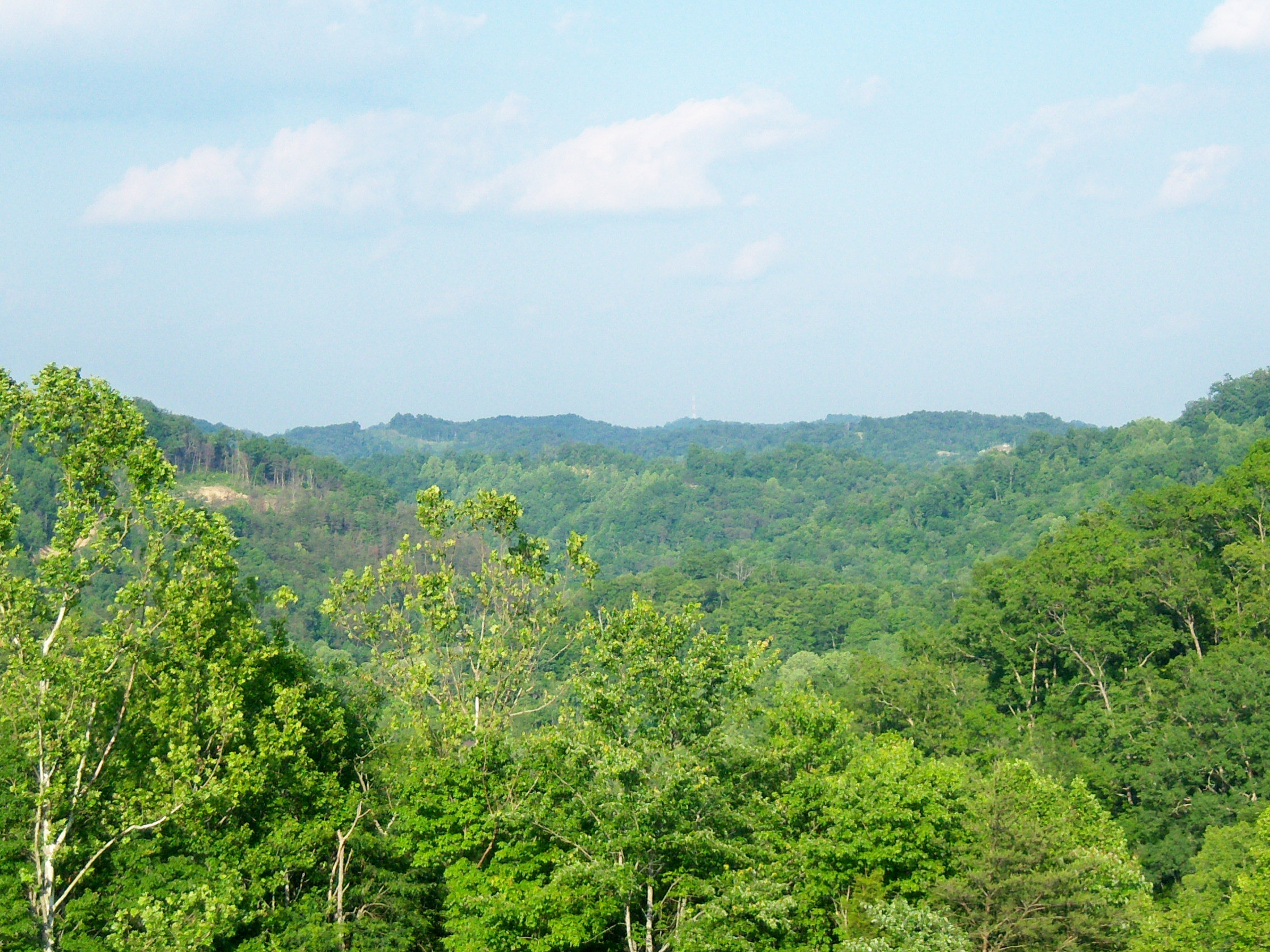
- Mountaintop view of Tutor Key

- Location within Kentucky Location within the United States
- Coordinates: 37°50′40″N 82°46′1″W
- Country: United States
- State: Kentucky
- County: Johnson
- Elevation: 600 ft (180 m)

Population (2000)
  - Total: 408
- Time zone: UTC-5 (Eastern (EST))
  - Summer (DST): UTC-4 (EDT)
- ZIP codes: 41263
- Area code: 606
- GNIS feature ID: 509251

Tutor Key is an unincorporated community in Johnson County, Kentucky, United States about 4.5 miles northeast of Paintsville. Tutor Key was originally known as Mingo.

== History ==
On July 3, 1897, the first post office opened in what is now Tutor Key. It was given the name Mingo by local Reverend E. J. Harris, who was from Mingo County, West Virginia. Beginning in the late 1930s, Mingo began having problems with mail being accidentally sent to Wingo, which is a city in Graves County, Kentucky. Supposedly, local resident Lon Daniels suggested the name "Tutor Key" after a brand of shoe polish that he had seen in a local store.

== Geography ==
Tutor Key has an elevation of 600 feet (183 m).

== Demographics ==
As of the census of 2000, there were 408 people, 171 households, and 130 families living in the ZIP Code Tabulation Area (ZCTA) for Tutor Key's ZIP code (41263).

The racial makeup of the ZCTA was 100% White.

In the ZCTA there were 171 households, out of which 35.3% had children under the age of 18 living with them, 70.5% were married couples living together, 7.7% had a female householder with no husband present, and 16.7% were non-families. 38.5% of all households were made up of individuals under 18 years old, 23.7% of all households had individuals 65 years and older, and the average family size was 2.90.

The median income for a household in the ZCTA was $18,036 (as of 1999), and the median income for a family was $23,393. Males had a median income of $47,604 versus $14,539 for females. The per capita income for Tutor Key was $12,571.

== Education ==
Since there are no schools located in Tutor Key, most students attend:

- W.R. Castle Memorial Elementary School in Wittensville (kindergarten-sixth grade)
- Johnson County Middle School in Paintsville (seventh-eighth grade)
- Johnson Central High School in Paintsville (ninth-twelfth grade)
