= Paintsville Country Club =

- U.S. National Register of Historic Places
- Location within Kentucky Location within the United States
- Location: Johnson County, near Paintsville, Kentucky, USA
- Coordinates: 37°48′28″N 82°46′09″W
- Area: .58 acres (0.23 ha)
- Built: 1930
- Architect: WPA
- Architectural style: Classical Revival
- NRHP reference No.: 88003168
- Added to NRHP: 26 January 1989

The Paintsville Country Club is a historic country club located immediately east of Paintsville, Kentucky, United States. The land on which the building is located was donated by Paul B. Hall, who was Paintsville Medical Center's Chief of Staff in 1934–1981. Although the city of Paintsville owns the country club, the golf course is privately owned. The building was added to the National Register of Historic Places on 29 January 1989.

The clubhouse was constructed by the Works Progress Administration. The sandstone used in the construction was cut from nearby Kentucky Route 40 between Thelma and Paintsville. It officially opened on 24 November 1939.

The club's 18-hole golf course opened on 27 September 1929, and was designed by Paul B. Hall.
