= Oil Springs, Kentucky =

Unincorporated community in Kentucky, United States

- Unincorporated community
- Location within Kentucky Location within the United States
- Coordinates: 37°48′36″N 82°56′33″W
- Country: United States
- State: Kentucky
- County: Johnson
- Elevation: 833 ft (254 m)

Population (2000)
  - Total: 851
- Time zone: UTC-5 (Eastern (EST))
  - Summer (DST): UTC-4 (EDT)
- ZIP codes: 41238
- GNIS feature ID: 499786

Oil Springs (also Medina) is an unincorporated community in Johnson County, Kentucky, United States. It lies along Route 40 west of the city of Paintsville, the county seat of Johnson County. It has a post office with the ZIP code 41238.

== History ==
Oil Springs takes its name from the natural oil springs discovered in Johnson County. The springs once fed a popular health resort.

The first post office was established on January 29, 1868, with Hamilton Litteral as postmaster. It was also known as Medina for a short time after the Medina Seminary, which was a boarding school that was established there in the 1870s by John Riggs Long.

== Geography ==
Its elevation is 833 feet (254 m).

== Demographics ==
As of the 2000 census, there were 851 people, 340 households, and 267 families residing in the ZIP Code Tabulation Area for Oil Spring's ZIP code.

The racial makeup of the community is 99.9% White and 0.1% African American.

There were 340 households, out of which 34.7% had children under the age of 18, 67.6% were married couples living together, 8.5% had a female householder with no husband present, and 21.5% were non-families. 20.0% of all households were made up of individuals, and 7.9% had someone living alone who was 65 years of age or older. The average household size was 2.50 and the average family size was 2.87.

The median income for a household in the ZCTA was $30,750, and the median income for a family was $33,250. Males had a median income of $44,875 and $30,781 for females. The per capita income was $15,066. 22.9% of the families in the community were below the poverty line.

== Education ==
Most students residing in Oil Springs attend:

- Highland Elementary School in Staffordsville (kindergarten-sixth grade)
- Johnson County Middle School in Paintsville (seventh-eighth grade)
- Johnson Central High School in Paintsville (ninth-twelfth grade)

== See also ==
- Oil Springs Methodist Church
