= Winifred, Kentucky =

Unincorporated community in Kentucky, United States

- Unincorporated community
- Location within Kentucky Location within the United States
- Coordinates: 37°56′46″N 82°51′17″W
- Country: United States
- State: Kentucky
- County: Johnson
- Elevation: 840 ft (260 m)
- Time zone: UTC-5 (Eastern (EST))
  - Summer (DST): UTC-4 (EDT)
- GNIS feature ID: 509926

Winifred is an unincorporated community in Johnson County, Kentucky, United States. It is located at an elevation of 840 feet (256 m). Winifred is located in the ZIP Code Tabulation Area for ZIP code 41219, which includes the nearby community of Flat Gap.
