= Johnson County, Kentucky =

County in Kentucky, United States

- County
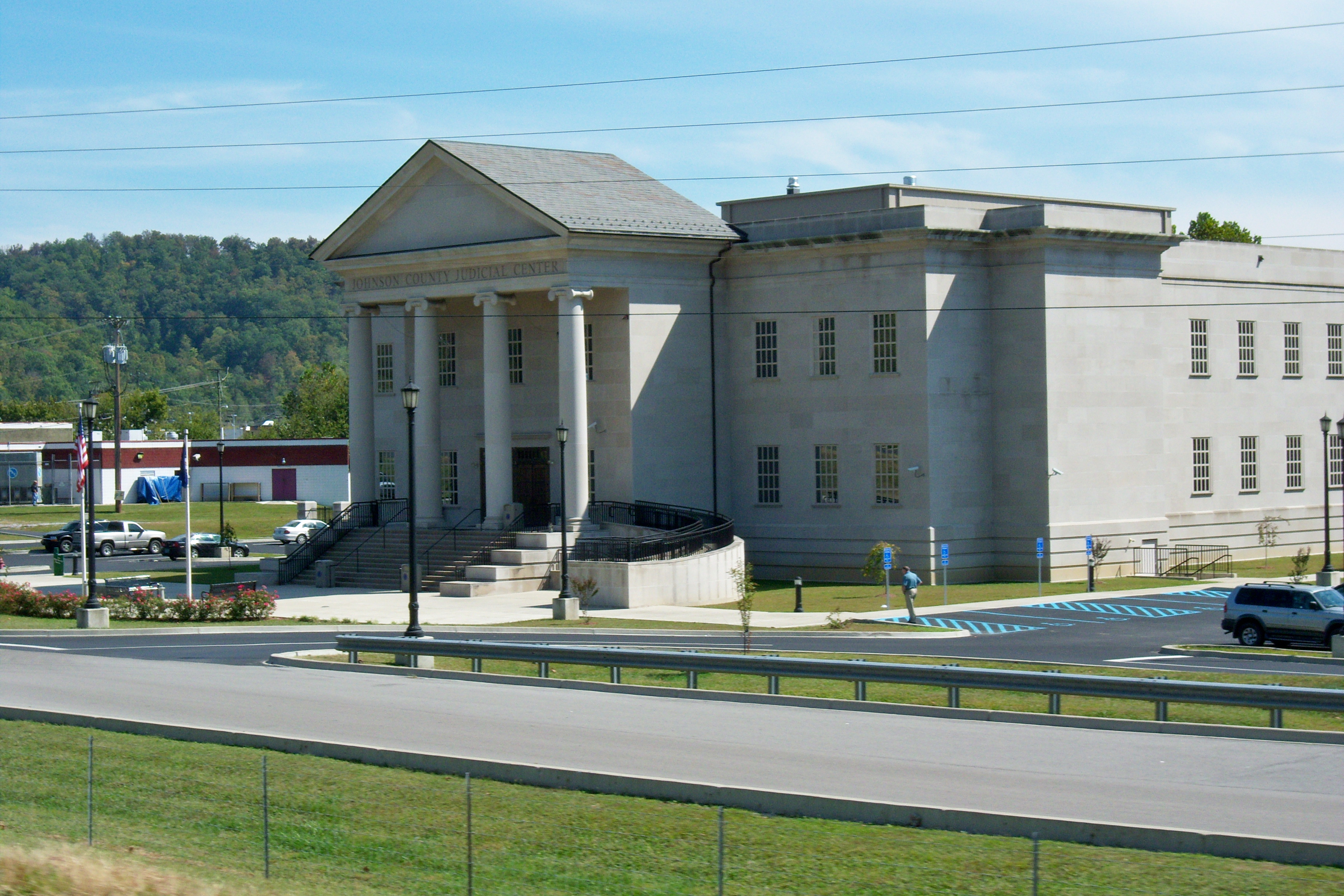
- Johnson County Judicial Center in Paintsville

- Location within the U.S. state of Kentucky
- Coordinates: 37°50′N 82°50′W
- Country: United States
- State: Kentucky
- Founded: February 24, 1843
- Named for: Richard Mentor Johnson
- Seat: Paintsville
- Largest city: Paintsville

Government
  - Judge/Executive: Mark McKenzie (R)

Area
  - Total: 264 sq mi (680 km^{2})
  - Land: 262 sq mi (680 km^{2})
  - Water: 2.2 sq mi (5.7 km^{2}) 0.8%

Population (2020)
  - Total: 22,680
  - Estimate (2025): 22,051 ▼
  - Density: 86.6/sq mi (33.4/km^{2})
- Time zone: UTC−5 (Eastern)
  - Summer (DST): UTC−4 (EDT)
- Congressional district: 5th
- Website: www.johnsoncoky.com

Johnson County is a county located in the Eastern Coalfield of the U.S. state of Kentucky. As of the 2020 census, the population was 22,680. Its county seat is Paintsville. The county was formed in 1843 and named for Richard Mentor Johnson, a colonel of the War of 1812, United States Representative, Senator, and Vice President of the United States.

Johnson County is classified as a moist county, which is a county in which alcohol sales are not allowed (a dry county), but containing a "wet" city, in this case Paintsville, where alcoholic beverage sales are allowed.

== History ==
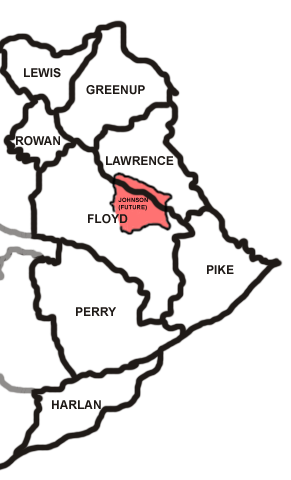
Eastern Kentucky around 1820. Future Johnson County is marked in red.

=== Formation ===
Johnson County was formed on February 24, 1843, by the Kentucky General Assembly from land given by Floyd, Lawrence, and Morgan counties. At that time, its county seat of Paintsville had already been a chartered city for nine years. Homes had been built in Paintsville as early as the 1810s.

Many of the families at the beginning of Johnson County's formation were of Scottish, Irish, English, or German descent. Also, a fact lost to most historians is the large population of French Huguenots who were confused as English because they fled via England en route to the United States. Many of these settlers migrated from North Carolina, Pennsylvania, and Virginia following their participation in the Revolutionary War.

For about its first twenty-five years, Johnson County and Paintsville struggled along. Roads and highways were nonexistent. Mail and supplies reached Johnson County from the Bluegrass region by horseback and steamboat. Years later, stage coaches began to connect eastern Kentucky and Johnson County to the bluegrass region and the rest of civilization.

=== Civil War era ===
As Johnson County and its county seat had begun to thrive, in 1860 the Civil War became a disrupter. Like other border areas, brothers fought against brothers, tearing families apart. Johnson County was not only part of a border state during the Civil War, but it was a border county as well.

Sometime between 1860 and 1862, the county enacted an ordinance that neither the Union or Confederate flags were to be flown within the county. This was repealed quickly after Colonel James Garfield's Union brigade marched through Paintsville, (with the United States Flag being raised above the town courthouse) on its way to defeat the Confederate cavalry at the Battle of Middle Creek in Floyd County.

=== John C. C. Mayo ===
Following the Civil War, Thomas Jefferson Mayo moved to Paintsville to work as a teacher. He fathered John C. C. Mayo, an important figure in the development of eastern Kentucky. The county citizenry is divided on their loyalty to his memory. Some would say he was a benefactor who assisted in the development of Paintsville, and as a result, Johnson County. That he helped develop banks, churches, streets, public utilities and railroad transportation. Others would say he was directly responsible for the influence coal companies had over the county's vast coal resources and the reason the region remains so economically depressed to this day.

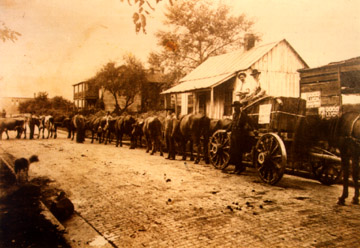
The funeral procession of John C.C. Mayo through Paintsville in Johnson County, 1914.

Coal was important for Johnson County and the rest of eastern Kentucky even before the Civil War, but its development halted at the start of the war. Financing was slow to return to the coal industry in eastern Kentucky and this inhibited development in Johnson County. The people were suspicious of outsiders and Mayo, a school teacher, was a known quantity and one of their own. So he was invaluable in helping the coal industry to gain a firm foothold in the coal fields of eastern Kentucky and to the industrialized north which spurred the development of railroads in the area. Carpetbaggers from the North became a common sight in the area. It was during this time that many of the citizens of Johnson County were given misleading information and sold all mineral rights to their property for pennies on the dollar of what the rights were worth. In some cases, for a new shotgun. It was also during this time that many people lost their property due to a strange rash of fires in several county seats, destroying deeds and records of ownership, which paved the way for land-grabbers to take what the owners did not want to relinquish.

The Chesapeake and Ohio Railway first opened its Paintsville depot on September 1, 1904, following 25 years of work connecting it to Lawrence County. The rails were paid for by donations, stocks and bonds, and the hard work of local citizens. History shows that the rail companies leaked information and frequently changed planned routes to create bidding wars and to finance the rails. Following the development of the railroad, tens of thousands of tons of coal were being transported out of eastern Kentucky by 1910.

Mayo went on to be a political lobbyist, and eastern Kentucky's only member of the Democratic National Committee. He had influence in electing Kentucky's governors, members of Congress and the election of President Woodrow Wilson.

He died on May 11, 1914, after becoming ill following a trip to Europe. During his life, he built a historic mansion in Paintsville which has become known as Mayo Mansion.

== Geography ==
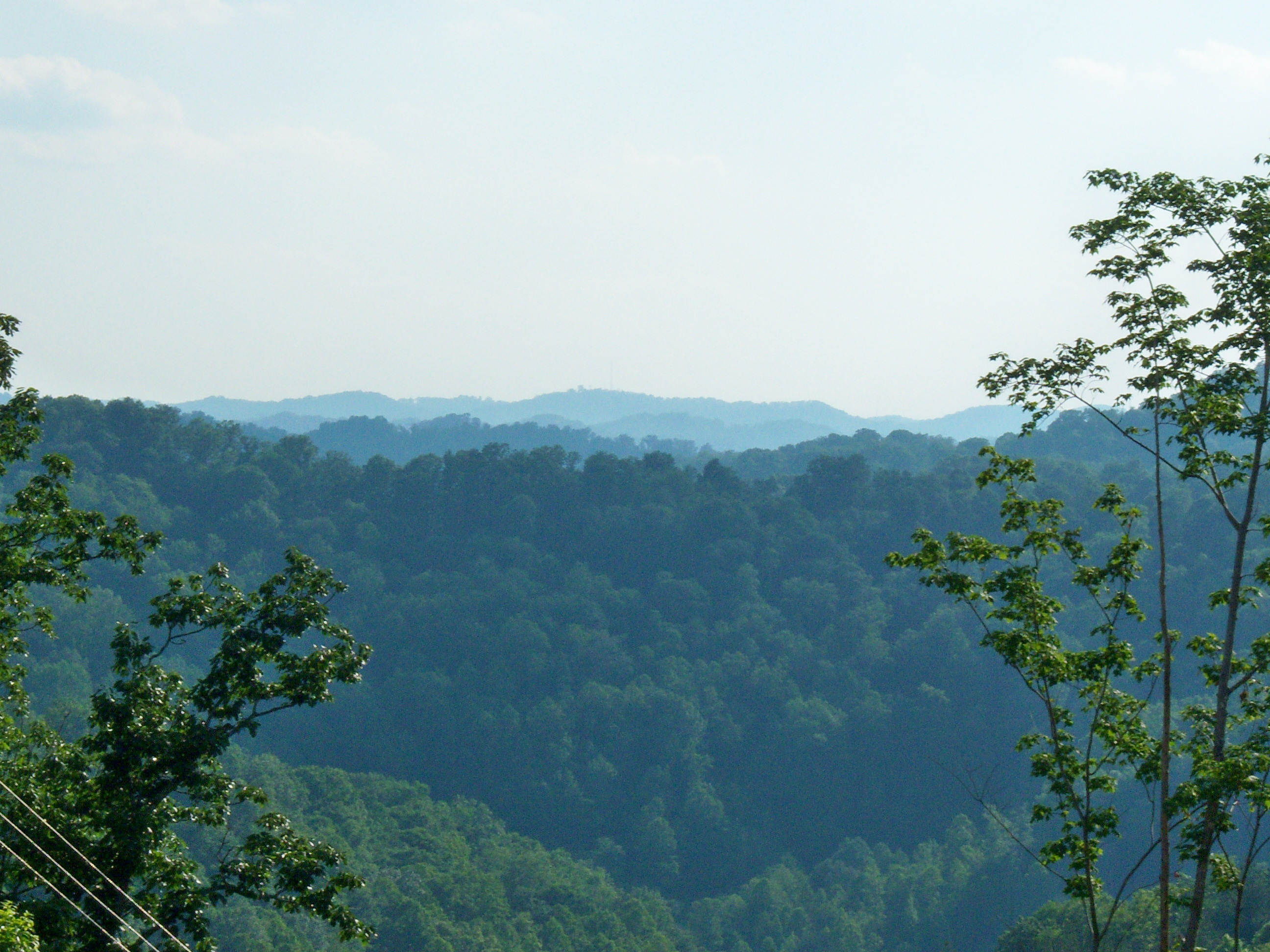
A typical mountain vista.

According to the United States Census Bureau, the county has a total area of 264 square miles (680 km^{2}), of which 262 square miles (680 km^{2}) is land and 2.2 square miles (5.7 km^{2}) (0.8%) is water.

The county's highest point is Stuffley Knob, with an elevation of 1,496 feet (456 m). Its lowest point is the Levisa Fork on the Lawrence County border, with an elevation of about 550 feet (170 m).

=== Adjacent counties ===
- Lawrence County (north)
- Martin County (east)
- Floyd County (south)
- Magoffin County (southwest)
- Morgan County (northwest)

== Transportation ==
=== Major highways ===
- U.S. Route 23
- U.S. Route 460
- Kentucky Route 40
- Kentucky Route 321
- Kentucky Route 3

=== Air ===
Big Sandy Regional Airport, located in adjacent Martin County, is the nearest airport. It is used as a general aviation airport.

The nearest airport that provides commercial aviation services is Tri-State Airport, which is located 55 miles (89 km) northeast in Ceredo, West Virginia.

== Demographics ==
Historical population
Census	Pop.	Note	%±
1850	3,873		—
1860	5,306		37.0%
1870	7,494		41.2%
1880	9,155		22.2%
1890	11,027		20.4%
1900	13,730		24.5%
1910	17,482		27.3%
1920	19,622		12.2%
1930	22,968		17.1%
1940	25,771		12.2%
1950	23,846		−7.5%
1960	19,748		−17.2%
1970	17,539		−11.2%
1980	24,432		39.3%
1990	23,248		−4.8%
2000	23,445		0.8%
2010	23,356		−0.4%
2020	22,680		−2.9%
2025 (est.)	22,051	▼	−2.8%
U.S. Decennial Census; 1790–1960 1900–1990; 1990–2000 2010–2020

=== 2020 census ===
As of the 2020 census, the county had a population of 22,680. The median age was 42.9 years. 21.7% of residents were under the age of 18 and 19.0% of residents were 65 years of age or older. For every 100 females there were 94.7 males, and for every 100 females age 18 and over there were 92.0 males age 18 and over.

The racial makeup of the county was 96.7% White, 0.2% Black or African American, 0.2% American Indian and Alaska Native, 0.4% Asian, 0.0% Native Hawaiian and Pacific Islander, 0.2% from some other race, and 2.2% from two or more races. Hispanic or Latino residents of any race comprised 0.9% of the population.

26.2% of residents lived in urban areas, while 73.8% lived in rural areas.

There were 9,236 households in the county, of which 30.5% had children under the age of 18 living with them and 27.6% had a female householder with no spouse or partner present. About 27.3% of all households were made up of individuals and 12.1% had someone living alone who was 65 years of age or older.

There were 10,493 housing units, of which 12.0% were vacant. Among occupied housing units, 71.3% were owner-occupied and 28.7% were renter-occupied. The homeowner vacancy rate was 2.1% and the rental vacancy rate was 8.1%.

=== 2000 census ===
As of the census of 2000, there were 23,445 people, 9,103 households, and 6,863 families residing in the county. The population density was 90 per square mile (35/km^{2}). There were 10,236 housing units at an average density of 39 per square mile (15/km^{2}). The racial makeup of the county was 98.64% White, 0.25% Black or African American, 0.13% Native American, 0.29% Asian, 0.02% Pacific Islander, 0.09% from other races, and 0.58% from two or more races. 0.61% of the population were Hispanic or Latino of any race.

There were 9,103 households, out of which 34.10% had children under the age of 18 living with them, 60.50% were married couples living together, 11.30% had a female householder with no husband present, and 24.60% were non-families. 22.30% of all households were made up of individuals, and 9.00% had someone living alone who was 65 years of age or older. The average household size was 2.52 and the average family size was 2.93.

In the county, the population was spread out, with 24.00% under the age of 18, 8.80% from 18 to 24, 28.90% from 25 to 44, 25.70% from 45 to 64, and 12.60% who were 65 years of age or older. The median age was 37 years. For every 100 females there were 93.10 males. For every 100 females age 18 and over, there were 90.70 males.

The median income for a household in the county was $24,911, and the median income for a family was $29,142. Males had a median income of $29,762 versus $20,136 for females. The per capita income for the county was $14,051. About 21.70% of families and 26.60% of the population were below the poverty line, including 35.50% of those under age 18 and 19.30% of those age 65 or over.

== Politics ==
United States presidential election results for Johnson County, Kentucky
Year	Republican		Democratic		Third party(ies)	
Year	No.	%	No.	%	No.	%
1912	998	29.40%	1,034	30.47%	1,362	40.13%
1916	2,500	65.51%	1,253	32.84%	63	1.65%
1920	4,373	71.26%	1,714	27.93%	50	0.81%
1924	3,078	61.67%	1,480	29.65%	433	8.68%
1928	5,339	73.98%	1,869	25.90%	9	0.12%
1932	4,871	60.69%	3,134	39.05%	21	0.26%
1936	4,305	57.94%	3,106	41.80%	19	0.26%
1940	5,042	62.29%	3,042	37.58%	10	0.12%
1944	4,642	67.53%	2,222	32.32%	10	0.15%
1948	3,993	62.26%	2,378	37.08%	42	0.65%
1952	5,199	66.18%	2,654	33.78%	3	0.04%
1956	5,802	71.06%	2,356	28.85%	7	0.09%
1960	5,317	66.97%	2,622	33.03%	0	0.00%
1964	3,075	49.94%	3,053	49.59%	29	0.47%
1968	4,046	61.90%	2,142	32.77%	348	5.32%
1972	4,907	72.25%	1,840	27.09%	45	0.66%
1976	4,891	56.64%	3,683	42.65%	61	0.71%
1980	5,039	60.50%	3,142	37.72%	148	1.78%
1984	5,225	62.58%	3,078	36.87%	46	0.55%
1988	4,619	56.25%	3,538	43.09%	54	0.66%
1992	3,614	42.84%	3,669	43.49%	1,153	13.67%
1996	3,262	42.56%	3,348	43.68%	1,054	13.75%
2000	4,783	58.47%	3,251	39.74%	146	1.78%
2004	5,940	63.84%	3,288	35.34%	76	0.82%
2008	5,948	69.84%	2,407	28.26%	162	1.90%
2012	7,095	78.53%	1,723	19.07%	217	2.40%
2016	8,043	84.03%	1,250	13.06%	279	2.91%
2020	8,450	82.91%	1,608	15.78%	134	1.31%
2024	8,150	84.57%	1,350	14.01%	137	1.42%

Johnson County is at present and historically a powerfully Republican county. No Democrat has ever won a majority of the county's vote since at least 1880, though Bill Clinton did gain narrow pluralities in 1992 and 1996, and Lyndon Johnson lost to Barry Goldwater by a mere twenty-two votes in 1964.

=== Local government ===
- County Judge/Executive: Mark McKenzie
- Commissioner District 1: Jessica Click
- Commissioner District 2: Mike Jarrell
- Commissioner District 3: Tim Salyer
- County Attorney: Michael S. Endicott
- County Court Clerk: Sallee Holbrook
- Circuit Court Clerk: Penny Adams Castle
- PVA: Michael "Dip" Stafford
- Sheriff: Scott Hazlette
- Jailer: Steve Rose
- Coroner: J.R. Frisby
- Constable District 1: James Castle
- Constable District 2: Bruce Ritz
- Constable District 3: David Pridemore
- County Surveyor: Clarence Scarberry

=== Elected officials ===
Elected officials as of January 3, 2025
U.S. House	Hal Rogers (R)	KY 5
Ky. Senate	Phillip Wheeler (R)	31
Ky. House	Bobby McCool (R)	97

== Education ==
=== Public ===
Johnson County is home to two public school districts.

==== Johnson County Schools ====
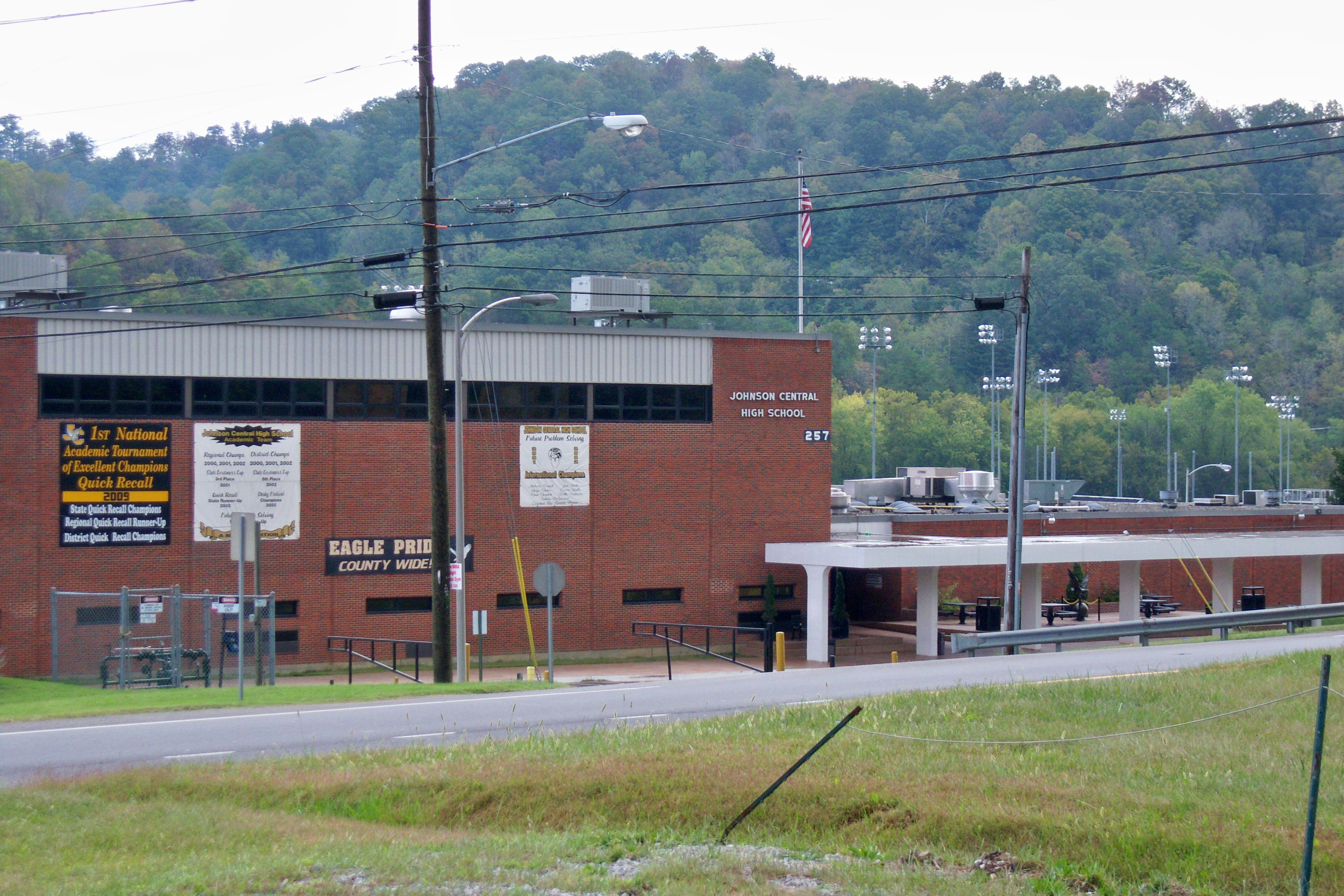
Johnson Central High School

The Johnson County School District, which operates schools throughout the county, including the city of Paintsville, operates the following schools:

Porter Elementary, W.R. Castle Elementary, Highland Elementary, Flat Gap Elementary, Central Elementary, Johnson County Middle School, and Johnson Central High School.

Central Elementary was ranked top-performing elementary school in 5-6 statewide CTBS/CATS testing. Central Elementary was also the top-performing elementary school (based on national CTBS testing) in the Southeastern US.

Johnson County Middle School's academic team has won the most State Governor's Cups. It has won the Cup in 1999, 2000, 2004, 2006, 2007, 2008, 2009, 2010, 2012, 2013, and 2014. It has won numerous state Quick Recall awards and its Future Problem Solving team has won state and international awards and acclaim.

Johnson Central High School performs well in various areas and is well known statewide for their academic, football, and basketball teams. The high school was recently named a U.S. News & World Report Top American High School, being given a bronze award. Johnson Central offers many clubs including STLP, FBLA, DECA, Beta, FFA, HOSA, SkillsUSA and FCCLA. Johnson Central is also home to a new Career Technology Center.

==== Paintsville Independent Schools ====
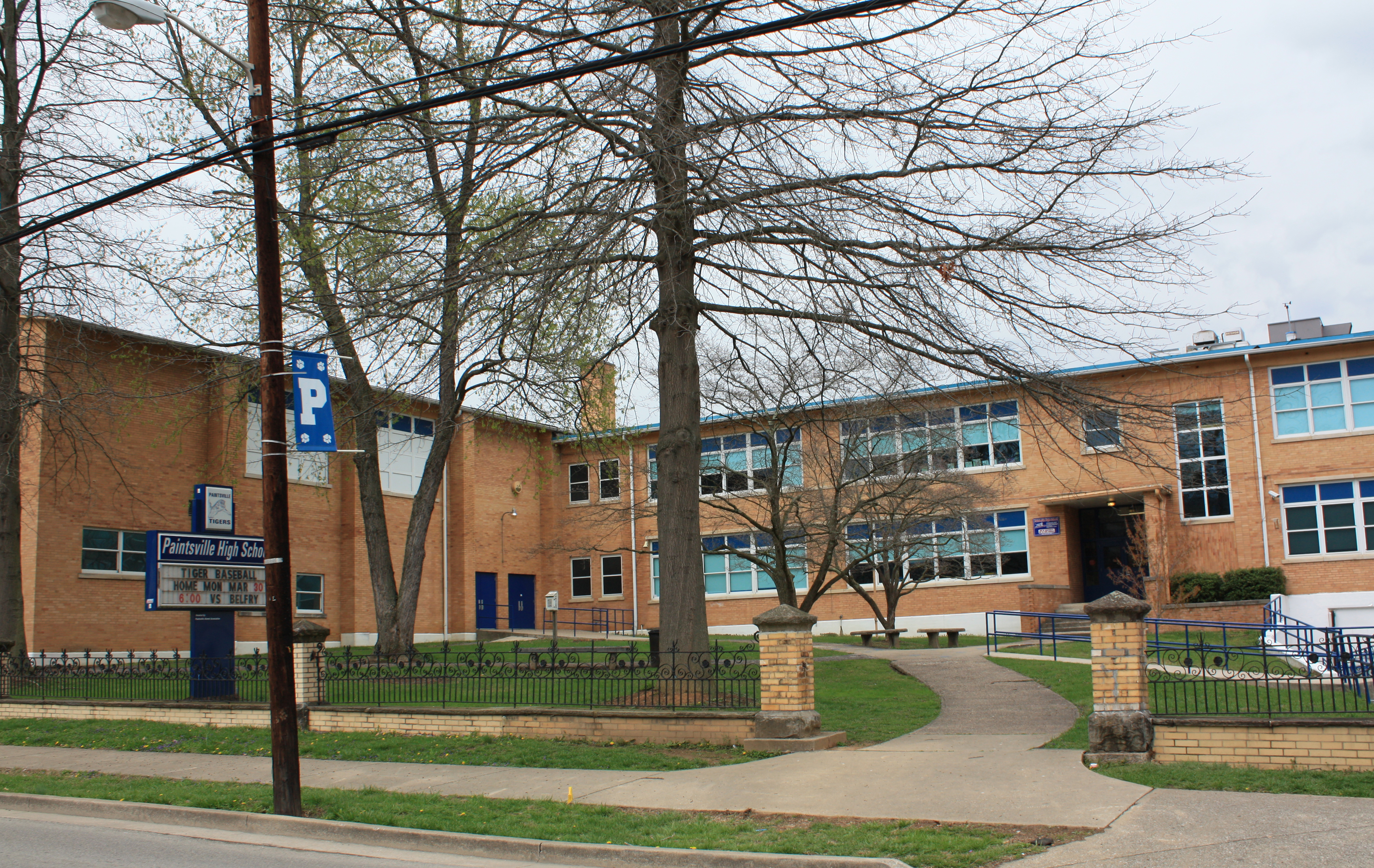
Paintsville High School

The Paintsville Independent School District also operates two schools: Paintsville Elementary School, a K-6 facility, and the 7-12 Paintsville High School. Paintsville High also has earned numerous sport titles. The school has won boys' state championships in football, basketball, baseball and golf. Note that in Kentucky, the only sports in which schools are divided into enrollment classes are football, cross-country and track.

Both the Johnson County and Paintsville Independent districts met all of the No Child Left Behind standards set by the national government.

=== Private ===
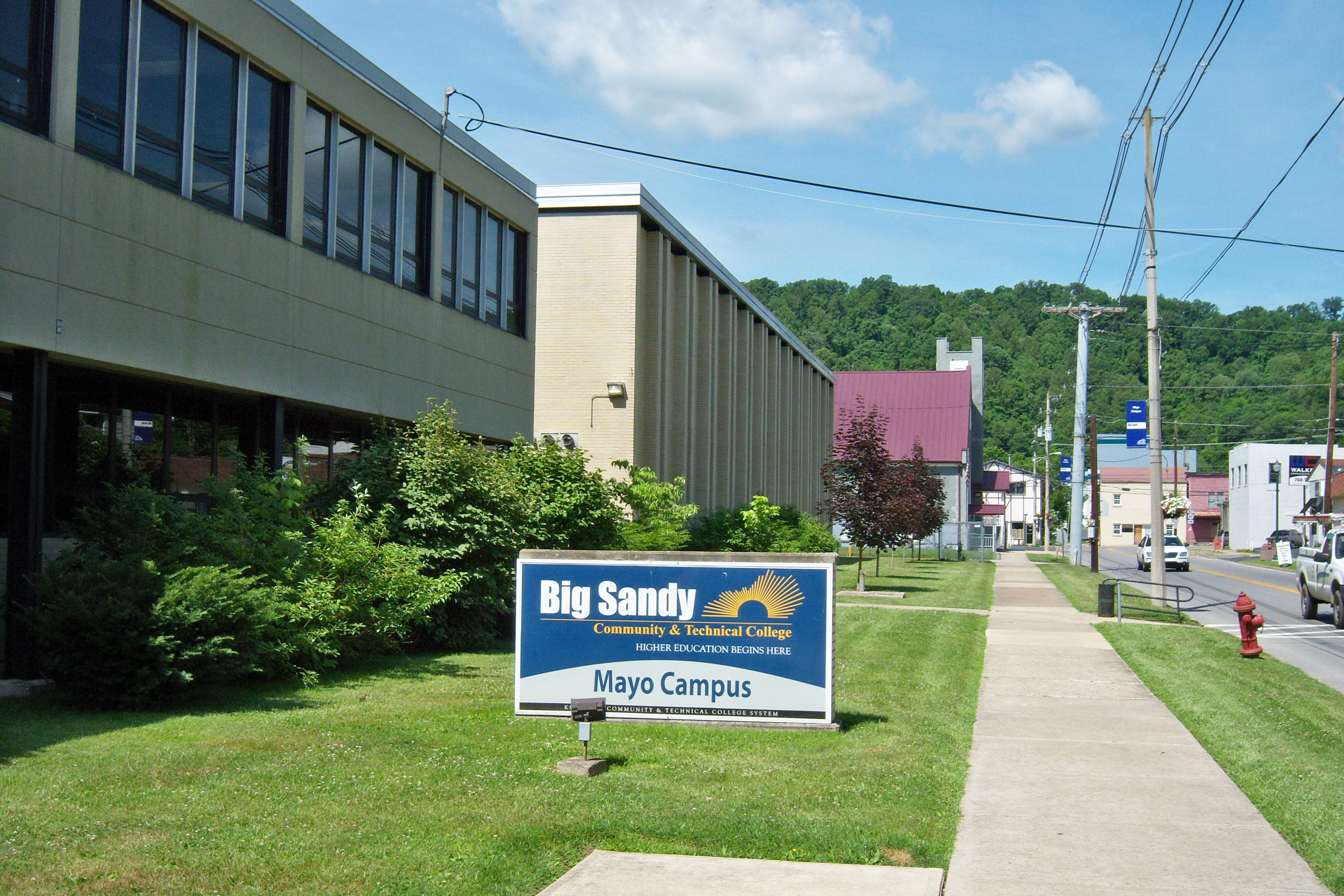
Big Sandy Community and Technical College

Two private schools also operate in the county: Our Lady of the Mountain School (K–8) and The Piarist School, a college preparatory school (6–12).

=== Colleges ===
- Big Sandy Community and Technical College manages two campuses in Johnson County: Mayo and Hager Hill.

== Attractions ==
=== Kentucky Apple Festival ===
In the same year as Mayo's death (1914), the first county fair was held in Paintsville, where the first Apple King was also crowned.

In 1962, Johnson County hosted the first Kentucky Apple Festival, which has been held annually in Paintsville since. The streets of downtown Paintsville are closed to vehicular traffic and festivities to include live music and entertainment, along with various competitions.

=== Parks and recreation ===
Paintsville Lake State Park

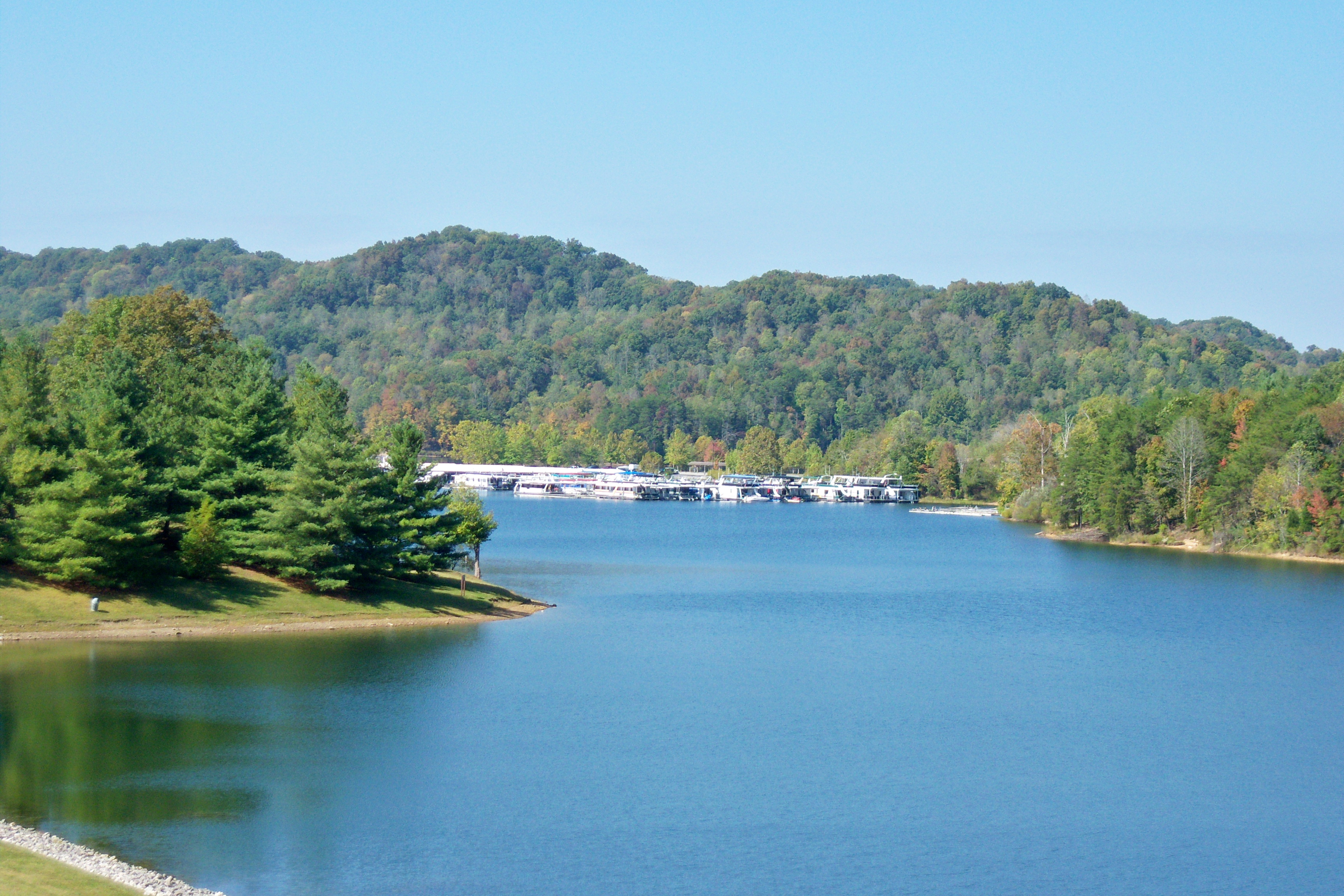
Paintsville Lake and marina

This scenic state park contains a 1,140 acres (4.6 km^{2}) lake, a 12,404-acre (50.20 km^{2}) wildlife management area, a marina, a 4 lane boat dock, a restaurant, a convenience store, boat rentals, multiple picnic shelters, playgrounds, and both developed and primitive camp sites. It is located on route 2275 at Staffordsville, just a few miles out of Paintsville.

Paintsville Recreation Center

The Paintsville Recreation Center contains a basketball court, a playground, and a volleyball court. Located on Preston Street in Paintsville.

Paintsville Country Club & Golf Course

This 18-hole golf course was established on September 27, 1929, making it one of the oldest golf courses in Eastern Kentucky. The country club was built in 1930 by the WPA and is on the National Register of Historic Places. Located on Kentucky Route 1107 in Paintsville.

=== Museums ===
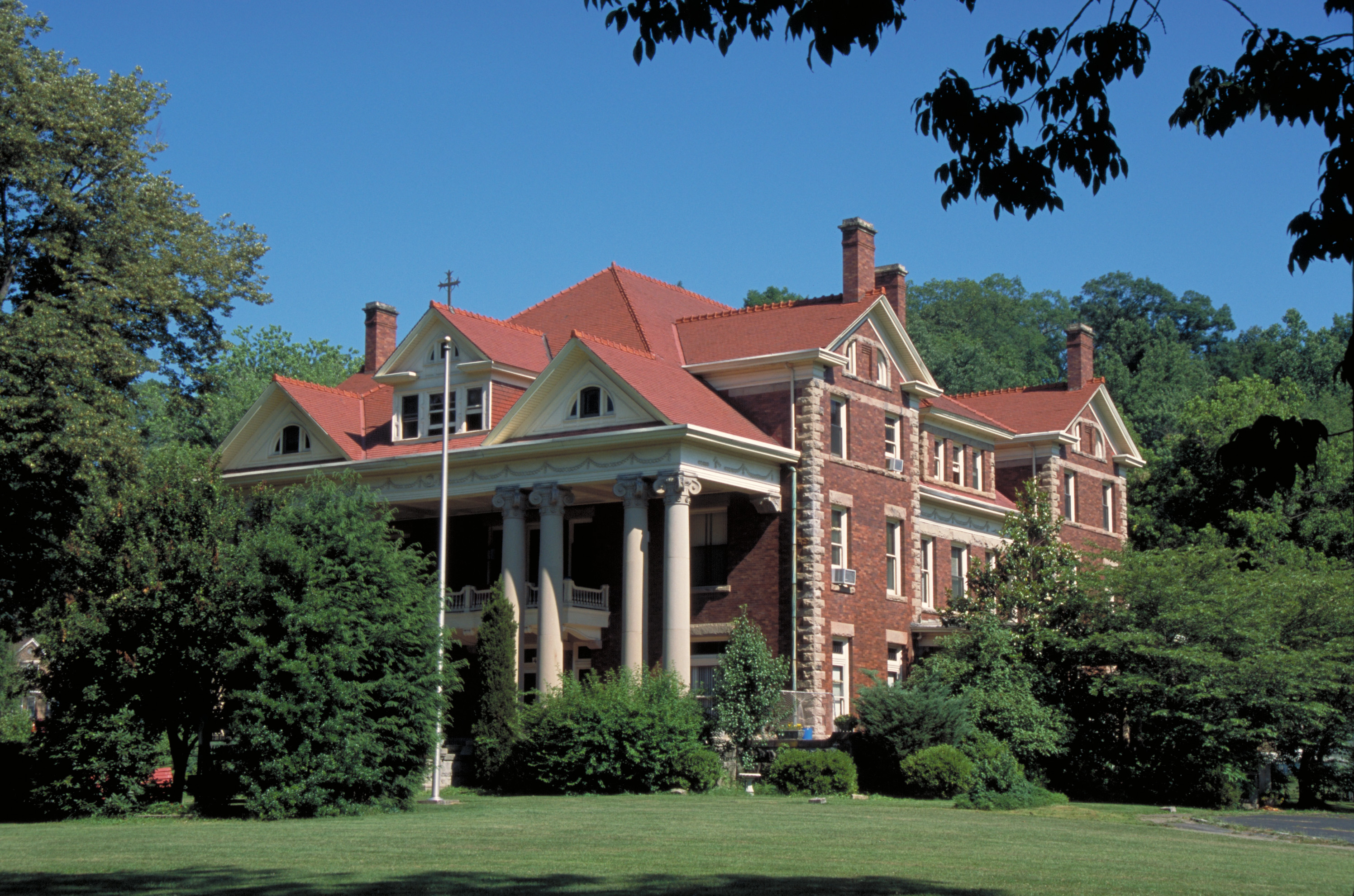
Mayo Mansion

U.S. 23 Country Music Highway Museum

This museum has many exhibits that tell the stories of the country music stars that grew up near U.S. Route 23 in Eastern Kentucky. Located at 120 Staves Branch in Paintsville.

The Coal Miners' Museum

This museum tells the history of the local area's coal mining industry. Located on Millers Creek Road in Van Lear.

=== Historical sites ===
Mayo Mansion

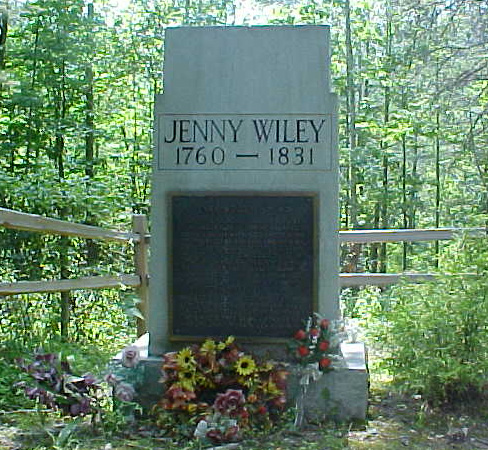
Jenny Wiley Gravesite

This 43-room mansion was built by John C. C. Mayo between 1905 and 1912 and now serves as Our Lady of the Mountains School. Located on Third Street in Paintsville.

Mayo Memorial United Methodist Church

The church was also constructed by John C. C. Mayo, who hired 100 Masons from Italy to construct it. The church has an organ donated by Andrew Carnegie and has several large stained glass windows. The church opened in the fall of 1909. Located on Third Street in Paintsville, beside Mayo Mansion.

Jenny Wiley Gravesite

Jenny Wiley is a historical figure who was captured by Native Americans in Virginia. After she escaped captivity, she reunited with her husband and lived in Johnson County until her death in 1831. Her grave is located just off Highway 581 at River.

=== Points of interest ===
Loretta Lynn Homeplace

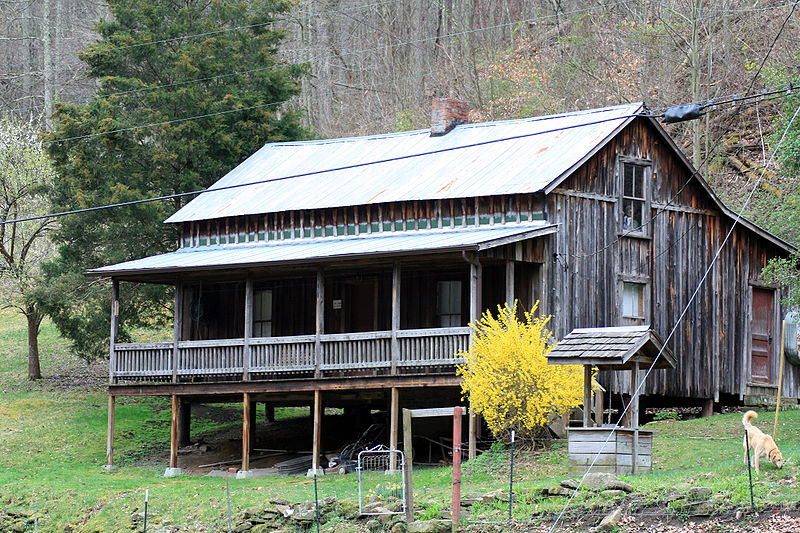
Loretta Lynn Birthplace

Childhood home of country music superstar, Loretta Lynn Located at Butcher Hollow in Van Lear.

Forrest and Maxie Preston Memorial Bridge

This 420-foot (130 m) pedestrian only swinging bridge is the world's longest plastic bridge. The deck of the bridge is made of glass fiber-reinforced polymer. It crosses the Levisa Fork of the Big Sandy River and connects the communities of River and Offutt. Located on Kentucky Route 581 at River.

Mountain Homeplace

The Mountain Homeplace gives a unique look at a replica of an Eastern Kentucky farming community from the mid-nineteenth century. It contains a one-room schoolhouse, a church, a blacksmith shop, a cabin, a barn, and farm grounds. There are also demonstrations of old time skills and crafts. It is located near the dam at Paintsville Lake State Park.

== Miscellaneous ==
Johnson County is also the former home of the Enterprise Association of Regular Baptists, which was organized on October 26, 1894, at Enterprise (now known as Redbush), Kentucky. The association now resides at 1560 Nibert Road, Gallipolis, Ohio, 45631.

== Communities ==
=== City ===
- Paintsville (county seat)

=== Census-designated places ===
- Van Lear
- West Van Lear

=== Unincorporated communities ===
- Asa
- Boonscamp
- Chandlerville
- Chestnut
- Collista
- Denver
- Dobson
- East Point
- Elna
- Flat Gap
- Fuget
- Hager Hill
- Hammond Creek
- Hargis
- Keaton
- Kerz
- Leander
- Low Gap
- Manila
- Meally
- Nero
- Nippa
- Odds
- Offutt
- Oil Springs
- Redbush
- River
- Riceville
- Sip
- Sitka
- Staffordsville
- Stambaugh
- Swamp Branch
- Thealka
- Thelma
- Tutor Key
- Volga
- Whitehouse
- Williamsport
- Winifred
- Wittensville

== Notable residents ==
- Loretta Lynn, legendary country singer. The title song on her 2004 album, Van Lear Rose, references her upbringing in the city of Van Lear located in Johnson County.
- Tyler Childers, singer-songwriter. Went to Paintsville High School.
- Crystal Gayle, country singer and younger sister of Loretta Lynn.
- Chris Stapleton, Grammy award-winning country musician
- Jenny Wiley, held captive by Native Americans.
- John C. C. Mayo, entrepreneur, assisted in bringing railroad service to eastern Kentucky.
- Jim Ford, singer-songwriter
- Hylo Brown, bluegrass and country music singer
- Johnnie LeMaster, former major league baseball player primarily with the San Francisco Giants
- John Pelphrey, basketball standout for University of Kentucky, and former University of Arkansas head basketball coach
- Willie Blair, former Major League Baseball player

== See also ==
- Big Sandy Area Development District
- Citizens National Bank
- Johnson County Public Library
- National Register of Historic Places listings in Johnson County, Kentucky
- Paintsville-Prestonsburg Combs Field
- Paul B. Hall Regional Medical Center
- Francis M. Stafford House
