= Fuget, Kentucky =

Unincorporated community in Kentucky, United States

- Unincorporated community
- Location within Kentucky Location within the United States
- Coordinates: 37°53′18″N 82°55′25″W
- Country: United States
- State: Kentucky
- County: Johnson
- Elevation: 823 ft (251 m)
- Time zone: UTC-5 (Eastern (EST))
  - Summer (DST): UTC-4 (EDT)
- GNIS feature ID: 508051

Fuget is an unincorporated community in Johnson County, Kentucky, United States. Fuget is located at an elevation of 823 feet (251 m). It is located in the ZIP Code Tabulation Area for ZIP code 41219.
