= Wittensville, Kentucky =

Unincorporated community in Kentucky, United States

- Unincorporated community
- Location within Kentucky Location within the United States
- Coordinates: 37°51′46″N 82°47′59″W
- Country: United States
- State: Kentucky
- County: Johnson
- Elevation: 692 ft (211 m)

Population (2000)
  - Total: 624
- Time zone: UTC-5 (Eastern (EST))
  - Summer (DST): UTC-4 (EDT)
- ZIP codes: 41274
- GNIS feature ID: 509395

Wittensville is an unincorporated community in Johnson County, Kentucky, United States. It has a United States Postal Service and its ZIP code is 41274.

== Geography and History ==
Wittensville has an elevation of 692 feet. It was first resided in 1843.

== Demographics ==
As of the census of 2000, there were 624 people, 250 households, and 192 families residing in the ZIP Code Tabulation Area (ZCTA for Wittensville's ZIP code. The racial makeup of the ZCTA was 98.6% White, 0.2% African American, and 0.5% Asian.

There were 250 households, out of which 39.6% had children under the age of 18, 51.2% were married couples living together, 8.5% had a female householder with no husband present, and 22.6% were non-families. 18.8% of all households were made up of individuals. The average household size was 2.50 and the average family size was 2.79.

The median income for a household in the ZCTA was $14,635, and the median income for a family was $18,750. Males had a median income of $25,948 and $18,274 for females. The per capita income was $7,517. 34.7% of the families in the community were below the poverty line.

== Education ==
Most students living in Wittensville attend:

- W.R. Castle Elementary School (kindergarten-sixth grade)
- Paintsville Elementary School in Paintsville (kindergarten-sixth grade)
- Johnson County Middle School in Paintsville (seventh-eighth grade)
- Johnson Central High School in Paintsville (ninth-twelfth grade)
- Paintsville High School in Paintsville (seventh-twelfth grade)

== Notable people ==
- Hubert Collins - Member of Kentucky House of Representatives
