= Oil Springs Methodist Church =

Historic church in Kentucky, United States

- U.S. National Register of Historic Places
- Location within Kentucky Location within the United States
- Location: Jct. KY 580 and KY 40, Oil Springs, Kentucky
- Coordinates: 37°48′37″N 82°56′35″W
- Area: 0.2 acres (0.081 ha)
- Built: 1893
- Architect: Mahan, Ben F.
- Architectural style: Gothic, High Victorian Gothic
- MPS: Johnson County MRA
- NRHP reference No.: 88003179
- Added to NRHP: January 26, 1989

Oil Springs Methodist Church is a historic church at the junction of KY 580 and KY 40 in Oil Springs, Kentucky. It was built in 1893 and added to the National Register in 1989.

It is a two-story frame church with a two-story pyramidal-roofed tower. It was designed and built by Ben F. Mahan. It was deemed notable as "Johnson County's best example of a late 19th century Gothic Revival frame church."
