= Leander, Kentucky =

Unincorporated community in Kentucky, United States

- Unincorporated community
- Location within Kentucky Location within the United States
- Coordinates: 37°45′11″N 82°52′18″W
- Country: United States
- State: Kentucky
- County: Johnson
- Elevation: 669 ft (204 m)
- Time zone: UTC-5 (Eastern (EST))
  - Summer (DST): UTC-4 (EDT)
- GNIS feature ID: 509201

Leander is an unincorporated community in Johnson County, Kentucky, United States. It is part of the 41222 ZIP Code Tabulation Area, which includes the nearby community of Hager Hill. Leander is located at an elevation of 669 feet.
