= Governor's Cup (academics) =

Academic tournament

Governor's Cup
The logo of the Governor's Cup Competition.

Governor's Cup is an academic tournament within the Commonwealth of Kentucky.

== Participation ==
Governor's Cup involves approximately 20,000 students. The following chart depicts the membership fees of each grade level:

Division	Grade Levels	Membership Fee
Elementary School	4 - 5	$225
Middle School	6 - 8	$325
High School	9 - 12	$325

== Operation ==
The participants of this challenge are organized into three separate grade divisions. These divisions are Elementary School, Middle School, and High School.

=== Elementary School division ===
The Elementary School division of Governor's Cup allows students enrolled in fourth and fifth grades to compete against one another in District and Regional competitions.

=== Middle School division ===
The Middle School division of Governor's Cup allows students enrolled in the sixth through eighth grades compete against one another in District, Regional, and State competitions.

=== High School division ===
The High School division of Governor's Cup allows students enrolled in the ninth through twelfth grades to compete against one another in District, Regional, and State competitions.

=== Competition ===
In the competition there are three basic levels: District (the first level and where a group of schools compete), Region (the top five testing students and the top two quick recall and future problem solving teams from each district), and State (the top five testing students and the top two quick recall and future problem solving teams from each region). The categories that a student and team can compete in are:

Individual: Written Assessments (Language Arts, Mathematics, Science, Arts and Humanities, Social Studies, and Written Composition).

Team: Quick Recall (two teams of four students each compete against each other to answer questions the quickest and correctly) and Future Problem Solving (teams of four that try to find the best solution to a problem that might arise).

=== State champions ===
Governor's Cup Trophies
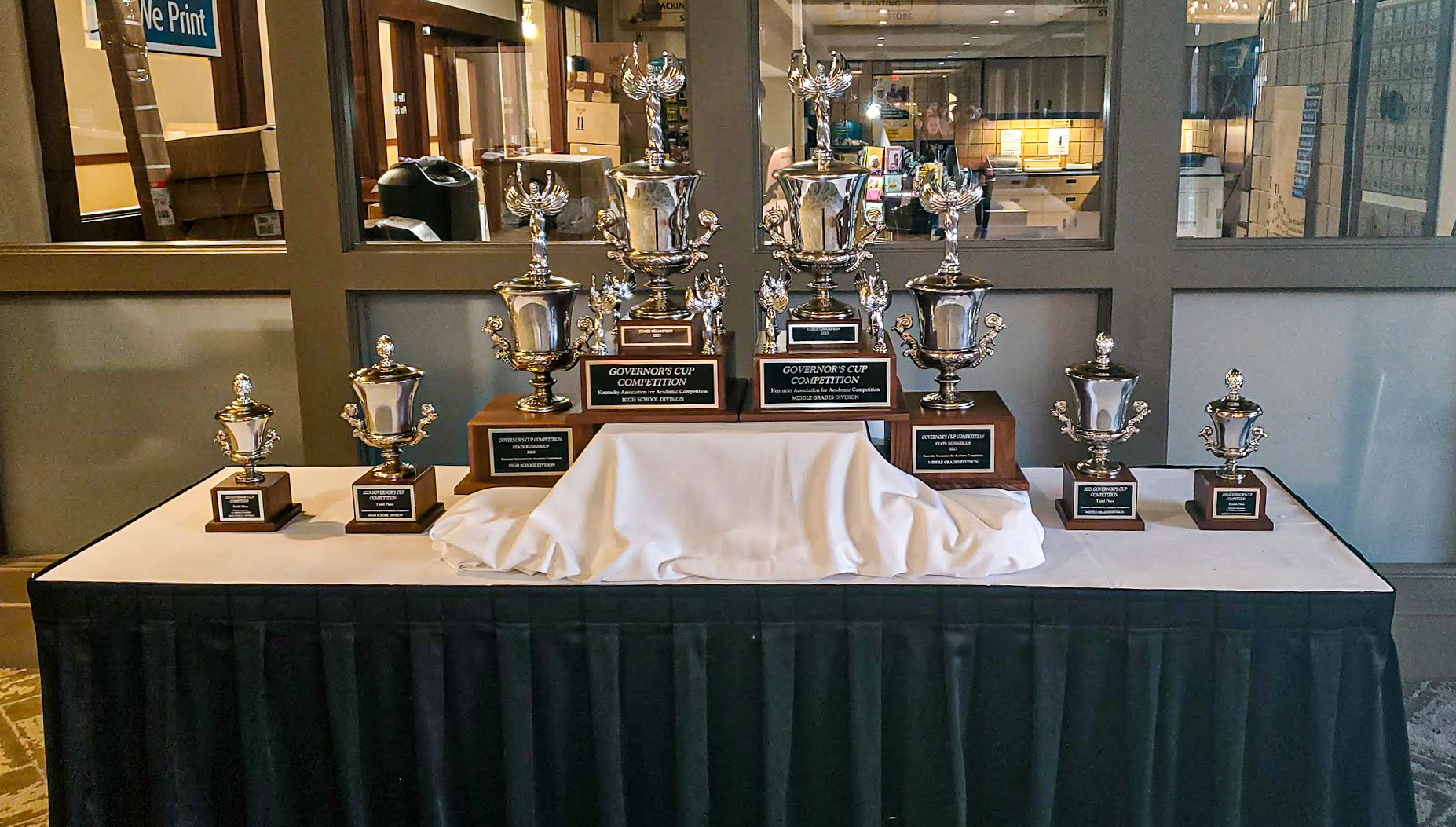
Governor's Cup championship trophies

Year	High School Champion	Middle School Champion
1986	Pikeville High School	Meyzeek Middle School
1987	Lafayette High School	Clark-Moores Middle School
1988	Ballard High School	Tates Creek Junior High School
1989	Ballard High School	James T. Alton Middle School
1990	Ballard High School	George M. Verity Middle School
1991	Tates Creek High School	Southern Junior High School (Pulaski)
1992	Tates Creek High School	Fred T. Burns Middle School
1993	duPont Manual High School	Daviess County Middle School
1994	duPont Manual High School	Daviess County Middle School
1995	Tates Creek High School	Russell Independent Middle School
1996	Russell Independent High School	Jesse Stuart Middle School
1997	Russell Independent High School	College View Middle School
1998	Paul Laurence Dunbar High School	Lexington Traditional Magnet School
1999	duPont Manual High School	Johnson County Middle School
2000	Paul Laurence Dunbar High School	Johnson County Middle School
2001	Paul Laurence Dunbar High School	Lexington Traditional Magnet School
2002	Paul Laurence Dunbar High School	Lexington Traditional Magnet School
2003	Paul Laurence Dunbar High School	Russell Independent Middle School
2004	Russell Independent High School	Johnson County Middle School
2005	duPont Manual High School	Lexington Traditional Magnet School
2006	Russell Independent High School	Johnson County Middle School
2007	Paul Laurence Dunbar High School	Johnson County Middle School
2008	Paul Laurence Dunbar High School	Johnson County Middle School
2009	Paul Laurence Dunbar High School	Johnson County Middle School
2010	Paul Laurence Dunbar High School	Johnson County Middle School
2011	Russell Independent High School	Meyzeek Middle School
2012	Paul Laurence Dunbar High School	Johnson County Middle School
2013	Paul Laurence Dunbar High School	Johnson County Middle School
2014	duPont Manual High School	Johnson County Middle School
2015	duPont Manual High School	Johnson County Middle School
2016	Russell Independent High School	Johnson County Middle School
2017	Henderson County High School	Johnson County Middle School
2018	Russell Independent High School	Johnson County Middle School
2019	Johnson Central High School	Meyzeek Middle School
2020	HS and MS State Finals canceled due to 2020 COVID-19 pandemic	
2021	duPont Manual High School	Bondurant Middle School
2022	duPont Manual High School	Meyzeek Middle School
2023	duPont Manual High School	Meyzeek Middle School
2024	Paul Laurence Dunbar High School	Samuel V. Noe Middle School
2025	Russell High School	Meyzeek Middle School
2026	Russell High School	Meyzeek Middle School

== See also ==
- Quick Recall
