= Hargis =

Hargis is a surname. Notable people with the surname include:

- Billy James Hargis (1925–2004), American evangelist
- Denver David Hargis (1921–1989), American politician
- Frankie Hargis (1965–2021), Cherokee politician
- Gary Hargis (born 1956), American baseball player
- John Hargis (swimmer) (born 1975), American swimmer
- John Hargis (basketball) (1920–1986), American basketball player
- V. Burns Hargis, American academic administrator

== Places ==
- Hargis, Kentucky, unincorporated community, United States
- Hargis, Louisiana, unincorporated community, United States
