= Nippa, Kentucky =

Unincorporated community in Kentucky, United States

- Unincorporated community
- Location within Kentucky Location within the United States
- Coordinates: 37°51′57″N 82°47′15″W
- Country: United States
- State: Kentucky
- County: Johnson
- Elevation: 636 ft (194 m)
- Time zone: UTC-5 (Eastern (EST))
  - Summer (DST): UTC-4 (EDT)
- GNIS feature ID: 508709

Nippa is an unincorporated community in Johnson County, Kentucky, United States. It is located at an elevation of 636 feet (194 meters). Nippa is located in the ZIP Code Tabulation Area for ZIP code 41240.
