= Odds, Kentucky =

Unincorporated community in Kentucky, United States

- Unincorporated community
- Location within Kentucky Location within the United States
- Coordinates: 37°45′20″N 82°41′35″W
- Country: United States
- State: Kentucky
- County: Johnson
- Elevation: 640 ft (200 m)
- Time zone: UTC-5 (Eastern (EST))
  - Summer (DST): UTC-4 (EDT)
- GNIS feature ID: 508733

Odds is an unincorporated community in Johnson County, Kentucky, United States. It is located at an elevation of 640 feet (195 m). Odds is located in the ZIP Code Tabulation Area for ZIP code 41265.
