= Oil Springs =

Oil Springs may refer to:

== Canada ==
- Oil Springs, Ontario, a village in Lambton County, Ontario

== United States ==
- Oil Springs, Kentucky, an unincorporated community in Johnson County, Kentucky
- Oil Springs Reservation, an Indian reservation of the Seneca tribe in New York state
