= Sip, Kentucky =

Unincorporated community in Kentucky, United States

- Unincorporated community
- Location within Kentucky Location within the United States
- Coordinates: 37°55′30″N 82°49′40″W
- Country: United States
- State: Kentucky
- County: Johnson
- Elevation: 837 ft (255 m)
- Time zone: UTC-5 (Eastern (EST))
  - Summer (DST): UTC-4 (EDT)
- ZIP codes: 41219
- GNIS feature ID: 509064

Sip is an unincorporated community in Johnson County, Kentucky, United States. It is located at an elevation of 837 feet (255 m). Its ZIP code is 41219.
