= Flat Gap, Kentucky =

Unincorporated community in Kentucky, United States

- Unincorporated community
- Location within Kentucky Location within the United States
- Coordinates: 37°56′03″N 82°53′15″W
- Country: United States
- State: Kentucky
- County: Johnson
- Elevation: 815 ft (248 m)

Population (2000)
  - Total: 1,920
- Time zone: UTC-5 (Eastern (EST))
  - Summer (DST): UTC-4 (EDT)
- ZIP codes: 41219

Flat Gap (historically spelled Flatgap) is an unincorporated community in Johnson County, Kentucky, United States. The community was named after the "flat gap" formed at the divide between the Lower Laurel and Mudlick Creeks. Flat Gap's first post office was established on February 26, 1873, with Henry Jayne as postmaster. Its ZIP code is 41219.

== Geography ==
Flat Gap has an elevation of 815 feet (248 m).

On June 2, 1990, one of the only tornadoes in Johnson County's history, touched down in Flat Gap at 1900. CST (7:00 p.m.) eastern time. The F1 tornado was 69 feet (23 yds) wide and created a one-mile (1.6 km) path of destruction. It caused an estimated $250,000 in damages. The only other recorded tornado happened on March 2, 2012, with widespread damage.

== Demographics ==
As of the census of 2000, there were 1,920 people, 732 households, and 574 families residing in the ZIP Code Tabulation Area for Flat Gap's ZIP code. The racial makeup of the ZCTA was 99.4% White, 0.2% African American, 0.2% Alaska Native/American Indian, 0.1% from other races, and 0.2% from two or more races. Hispanic or Latino of any race were 0.5% of the population.

There were 732 households, out of which 21.7% had children under the age of 18 living with them, 66.5% were married couples living together, 8.2% had a female householder with no husband present, and 21.6% were non-families. 19.7% of all households were made up of individuals, and 26.9% had someone living alone who was 65 years of age or older. The average household size was 2.62 and the average family size was 3.00.

The median income for a household was $23,409, and the median income for a family was $27,729. Males had a median income of $28,531 versus $20,179 for females. The per capita income was $13,483. About 21.9% of the families were below the poverty line.

== Education ==
Most students residing in Flat Gap attend:

- Flat Gap Elementary School (kindergarten-sixth grade)
- Johnson County Middle School (seventh-eighth grade)
- Johnson Central High School (ninth-twelfth grade)
