= Elna, Kentucky =

Unincorporated community in Kentucky, United States

- Unincorporated community
- Location within Kentucky Location within the United States
- Coordinates: 37°54′30″N 82°57′42″W
- Country: United States
- State: Kentucky
- County: Johnson
- Elevation: 876 ft (267 m)
- Time zone: UTC-5 (Eastern (EST))
  - Summer (DST): UTC-4 (EDT)
- GNIS feature ID: 507934

Elna is an unincorporated community in Johnson County, Kentucky, United States. It is located at an elevation of 876 feet (267 m). Elna is located in the ZIP Code Tabulation Area for ZIP code 41219.
