= Manila, Kentucky =

Unincorporated community in Kentucky, United States

- Unincorporated community
- Location within Kentucky Location within the United States
- Coordinates: 37°50′34″N 82°54′56″W
- Country: United States
- State: Kentucky
- County: Johnson
- Elevation: 794 ft (242 m)
- Time zone: UTC-5 (Eastern (EST))
  - Summer (DST): UTC-4 (EDT)
- ZIP codes: 41238
- GNIS feature ID: 509926

Manila is an unincorporated community in Johnson County, Kentucky, United States. Manila's original post office opened on July 1, 1898, and was named in honor of the Battle of Manila Bay, which had occurred earlier that year. The community's ZIP code is 41238.

Manila is at an elevation of 794 feet.
