= Volga, Kentucky =

Unincorporated community in Kentucky, United States

- Unincorporated community
- Location within Kentucky Location within the United States
- Coordinates: 37°53′17″N 82°52′24″W
- Country: United States
- State: Kentucky
- County: Johnson
- Elevation: 718 ft (219 m)
- Time zone: UTC-5 (Eastern (EST))
  - Summer (DST): UTC-4 (EDT)
- ZIP codes: 41219
- GNIS feature ID: 509295

Volga is an unincorporated community in Johnson County, Kentucky, United States. Its ZIP Code is 41219. Volga is located at an elevation of 718 feet (219 m).
