= Low Gap, Kentucky =

Unincorporated community in Kentucky, United States

- Unincorporated community
- Location within Kentucky Location within the United States
- Coordinates: 37°51′07″N 82°50′00″W
- Country: United States
- State: Kentucky
- County: Johnson
- Time zone: UTC-5 (Eastern (EST))
  - Summer (DST): UTC-4 (EDT)
- ZIP codes: 41238
- GNIS feature ID: 2096913

Low Gap is an unincorporated community in Johnson County, Kentucky, United States. Low Gap's ZIP code is 41238.
