= Hylo Brown =

American singer-songwriter (1922–2003)

- Born: Frank Brown; April 20, 1922; River, Kentucky, United States
- Died: January 17, 2003 (aged 80) Mechanicsburg, Ohio, United States
- Genres: Country, bluegrass
- Occupation: Singer-songwriter
- Instruments: Vocals, guitar, bass guitar
- Years active: 1939–1991
- Labels: Capitol (1959), Starday (1962-1963), Rural Rhythm (1966-1968), Copper Creek (1959/1996)
- Website: www.cmt.com/artists/az/brown_hylo/artist.jhtml

Hylo Brown (April 20, 1922 – January 17, 2003) was an American bluegrass and country music singer, guitarist and bass player.

== Biography ==
Frank "Hylo" Brown Jr. was born in River, Johnson County, Kentucky, United States, and began his career as a performer on radio station WCMI in Ashland, Kentucky in 1939. Soon, he moved to WLOG in Logan, West Virginia and their "Saturday Jamboree". Six months later, he moved with his family to Springfield, Ohio. He began composing songs and performing on local radio stations in Ohio. During an appearance at WPFB in Middletown, Ohio he received his nickname "Hylo" because Smoky Ward, who was on the show, could not remember his name and started calling him "Hi-Lo". That nickname was a humorous indication of Brown's presumed vocal range. In 1950, he recorded with Bradley Kincaid at WWSO studio in Springfield. Four years later, Brown wrote a song, "Lost To A Stranger", that was sent to Ken Nelson, the A & R man of Capitol Records. The song was meant to be recorded by Kitty Wells but instead, Nelson offered Brown a recording contract if he recorded it himself. On November 7, 1954, he cut his first recordings for Capitol Records. "Lost To A Stranger" became his first hit. In early 1955, he formed the Buckskin Boys performing on the WWVA Jamboree in Wheeling, West Virginia. In 1957, he joined Flatt & Scruggs on their "Martha White Mills" shows, and he was regularly featured in solo performances as well as with the Foggy Mountain Boys. He renamed the Buckskin Boys calling them The Timberliners. The Timberliners consisted of Brown on guitar, Red Rector on mandolin, Jim Smoak on banjo, Clarence "Tater" Tate on fiddle and Joe "Flap Jack" Phillips on bass. After his Capitol contract had expired, Brown signed with Starday Records in 1961. He retired in 1991 and moved to Mechanicsburg, Ohio.

Hylo Brown died from cancer on January 17, 2003. He is interred in Rose Hill Burial Park, Springfield, Clark County, Ohio.

Hylo Brown has received several honors posthumously: In 2003, just weeks after his death, he was inducted into the Society for the Preservation of Bluegrass Music of America's Preservation Hall of Greats. In 2009, he received the Distinguished Achievement Award from the International Bluegrass Music Association.

== Selected discography ==
- Hylo Brown - Capitol (1959)
- Bluegrass Balladeer - Starday Records (1962)
- Bluegrass Goes To College - Starday Records (1963)
- Sing Me A Bluegrass Song - Starday Records (1963)
- Hylo Brown and The Timberliners - Rural Rhythm (1966)
- Sings Folk Songs of Rural America - Rural Rhythm Records (1967)
- Legends & Tall Tales - Rural Rhythm Records (1967)
- Sings Country Gospel Songs - Rural Rhythm Records (1967)
- Hylo Brown and the Blue Ridge Mountain Boys - Rural Rhythm Records (1968)
- Sings the Blues - Rural Rhythm Records (1968)
- America's Favorite Balladeer - Rural Rhythm Records (1968)
- Hylo Brown & The Timberliners 1954-1960 - Bear Family Records (1992)
- In Concert (recorded in 1959) - Copper Creek Records (1996)
- 20 Old-Time Favorites (re-issue of Hylo Brown and the Blue Ridge Mountain Boys) - Rural Rhythm Records (1997)

== Other sources ==
- Vladimir Bogdanov, Chris Woodstra, Stephen Thomas Erlewine, All Music Guide to Country: The Definitive Guide to Country Music, 2003 (p. 90)
- Colin Escott, Liner notes to "Hylo Brown & The Timberliners, Bear Family Records BCD 15572
