= Chandlerville, Kentucky =

Unincorporated community in Kentucky, United States

- Unincorporated community
- Location within Kentucky Location within the United States
- Coordinates: 37°56′05″N 82°48′49″W
- Country: United States
- State: Kentucky
- County: Johnson
- Elevation: 860 ft (260 m)
- Time zone: UTC-5 (Eastern (EST))
  - Summer (DST): UTC-4 (EDT)
- ZIP codes: 41257
- GNIS feature ID: 507684

Chandlerville is an unincorporated community in Johnson County, Kentucky, United States. It is at an elevation of 860 feet (262 m). Chandlerville's ZIP code is 41257.
