= Denver, Kentucky =

Unincorporated community in Kentucky, United States

- Unincorporated community
- Location within Kentucky Location within the United States
- Coordinates: 37°46′34″N 82°51′17″W
- Country: United States
- State: Kentucky
- County: Johnson
- Elevation: 623 ft (190 m)
- Time zone: UTC-5 (Eastern (EST))
  - Summer (DST): UTC-4 (EDT)
- ZIP codes: 41215
- GNIS feature ID: 509201

Denver is an unincorporated community and coal town in Johnson County, Kentucky, United States. Its post office closed in October 2002.
