= Stuffley Knob =

Mountain in Kentucky, United States

- Location within Kentucky

Highest point
- Elevation: 1,496 ft (456 m)
- Coordinates: 37°56′59″N 82°55′13″W

Geography
- Location: Johnson County, Kentucky, U.S.
- Topo map: USGS Oil Springs

Climbing
- First ascent: unknown
- Easiest route: Hike

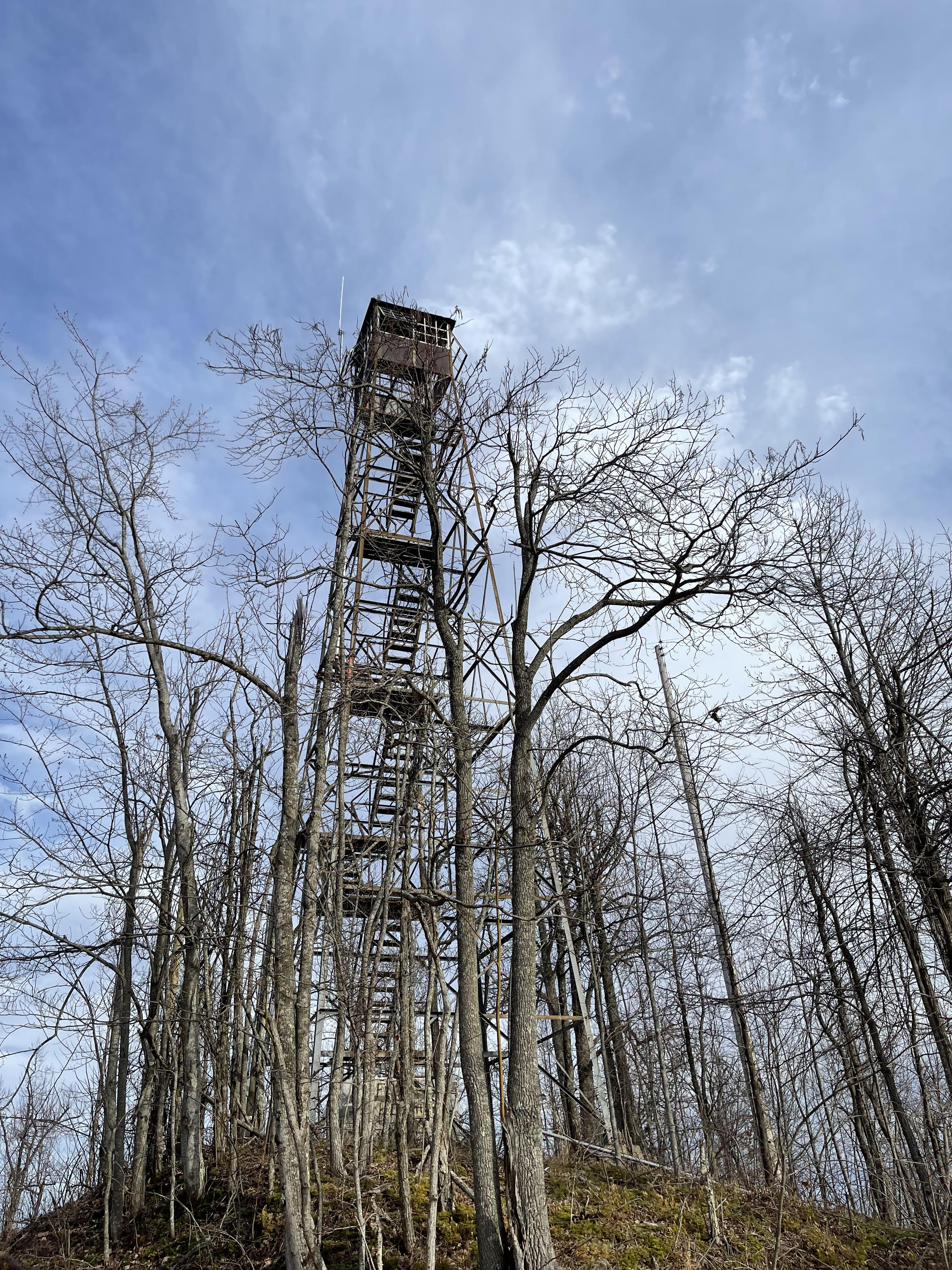

Stuffley Knob is the tallest mountain in Johnson County, Kentucky, with a summit elevation of 1,496 feet (456 m) above sea level. The summit is located about eight miles west of Paintsville at 37°46′59″N 82°55′13″W, just off of U.S. Route 460.
