= Jim Smoak =

American musician

Jim Smoak (born July 7, 1934) is an American bluegrass and country music banjo player from Louisiana. Smoak may be the first bluegrass banjoist to have come from that state.

Smoak was born and raised on a farm in Round O, South Carolina and learned banjo playing from his parents. He performed on WROL radio when he was eighteen years old. Smoak had a difficult time establishing an audience in his home state, so he moved north in the 1950s. Through 1953, he played occasionally with Bill Monroe & His Bluegrass Boys; the following year, he became a permanent member of the band. Smoak joined Hylo Brown & the Timberliners in 1958, and later began to perform with Arthur Smith and the Cracker Jacks on radio stations WAFB in Baton Rouge, Louisiana and WBT in Charlotte, North Carolina.

In 1961 he recorded with The Louisiana Honeydrippers the album Bayou Bluegrass on Arhoolie Records. That same year he went solo, recording for the tiny Folk Lyric label.

Smoak played both bluegrass and country music in the 1960s, and in the 1970s, he published three praised banjo instruction books, some of the first to include standard musical notation and tablature. Smoak recorded Moonshine Sonata, a solo album with Blue River Records, in 1979.

In later life, Smoak has worked closely with Traditional Arts Indiana (TAI) the official state folk arts program based at Indiana University. TAI featured Smoak on the 2022 recording Jim Smoak: At The Depot, which was released as part of TAI's National Endowment for the Arts funded Elder Music Series. Smoak has served as a master artist in TAI's Apprenticeship Program in 2020, 2022, and 2024. He received TAI's Indiana Heritage Fellowship in 2022. In 2023, Smoak received an Indiana Governor's Arts Award to honor his music and teaching career.
