= East Point, Kentucky =

Unincorporated community in Kentucky, United States

- Unincorporated community
- Location within Kentucky Location within the United States
- Coordinates: 37°44′46″N 82°47′27″W
- Country: United States
- State: Kentucky
- County: Johnson
- Elevation: 623 ft (190 m)
- Time zone: UTC-5 (Eastern (EST))
  - Summer (DST): UTC-4 (EDT)
- ZIP codes: 41216
- GNIS feature ID: 509201

East Point is an unincorporated community in Johnson County, Kentucky, United States. The community's first settlers were the Matthias Harman, Greer and Auxier families at Blockhouse Bottom. Their fort, Fort Harmon, was the site of numerous Indian raids. The first post office was originally established in Floyd County on February 6, 1871, but was moved to Johnson County in 1877. Its current ZIP code is 41216.

East Point is located at an elevation of 623 feet.
