= Collista, Kentucky =

Unincorporated community in Kentucky, United States

- Unincorporated community
- Location within Kentucky Location within the United States
- Coordinates: 37°46′57″N 82°49′28″W
- Country: United States
- State: Kentucky
- County: Johnson
- Time zone: UTC-5 (Eastern (EST))
  - Summer (DST): UTC-4 (EDT)
- ZIP codes: 41222

Collista is an unincorporated community in Johnson County, Kentucky, United States, located along U.S. Route 23 and Jenny's Creek. Its ZIP code is 41222.
