= Swamp Branch, Kentucky =

Unincorporated community in Kentucky, United States

- Unincorporated community
- Location within Kentucky Location within the United States
- Coordinates: 37°44′09″N 82°53′42″W
- Country: United States
- State: Kentucky
- County: Johnson
- Elevation: 728 ft (222 m)
- Time zone: UTC-5 (Eastern (EST))
  - Summer (DST): UTC-4 (EDT)
- ZIP codes: 41240
- GNIS feature ID: 509169

Swamp Branch is an unincorporated community in Johnson County, Kentucky, United States. Its ZIP Code is 41240. Swamp Branch is located at an elevation of 728 feet (222 m).

Its post office opened on December 22, 1923, with Crate Rice as postmaster.
