= Riceville, Kentucky =

Unincorporated community in Kentucky, United States

- Unincorporated community
- Location within Kentucky Location within the United States
- Coordinates: 37°44′4″N 82°55′28″W
- Country: United States
- State: Kentucky
- County: Johnson
- Time zone: UTC-5 (Eastern (EST))
  - Summer (DST): UTC-4 (EDT)
- ZIP codes: 41252
- GNIS feature ID: 508932

Riceville is an unincorporated community in Johnson County, Kentucky, United States. The community's first post office was established on October 17, 1891, and may have been named after local resident, Sherman Rice. A few years later, the community began to flourish after the Big Sandy & Kentucky River Railroad was extended into the community and a lumber mill was established. Riceville's ZIP code is 41252.
