= Hargis, Kentucky =

Unincorporated community in Kentucky, United States

- Unincorporated community
- Location within Kentucky Location within the United States
- Coordinates: 37°50′29″N 82°58′38″W
- Country: United States
- State: Kentucky
- County: Johnson
- Elevation: 915 ft (279 m)
- Time zone: UTC-5 (Eastern (EST))
  - Summer (DST): UTC-4 (EDT)
- GNIS feature ID: 508188

Hargis is an unincorporated community in Johnson County, Kentucky, United States. It is located at an elevation of 915 feet (279 m). It is located in the ZIP Code Tabulation Area (ZCTA) for ZIP code 41238.
