= Richardson, Kentucky =

Unincorporated community in Kentucky, United States

Coordinates: 37°56′38″N 82°38′33″W

Richardson is an unincorporated community in Lawrence County, in the U.S. state of Kentucky.

== History ==
A post office has been in operation at Richardson since 1883. The community was named in honor of George S. Richardson, a railroad official.
