= Tomahawk, Kentucky =

Unincorporated community in Kentucky, United States

Coordinates: 37°52′07″N 82°35′50″W

Tomahawk is an unincorporated community that stretches along Kentucky Route 40 in Martin County, Kentucky, United States, in the eastern part of the state near the West Virginia border. It is located on Rockhouse Fork of Rockcastle Creek, approximately six miles (9.6 km) west of Inez, the county seat.

== Establishment ==
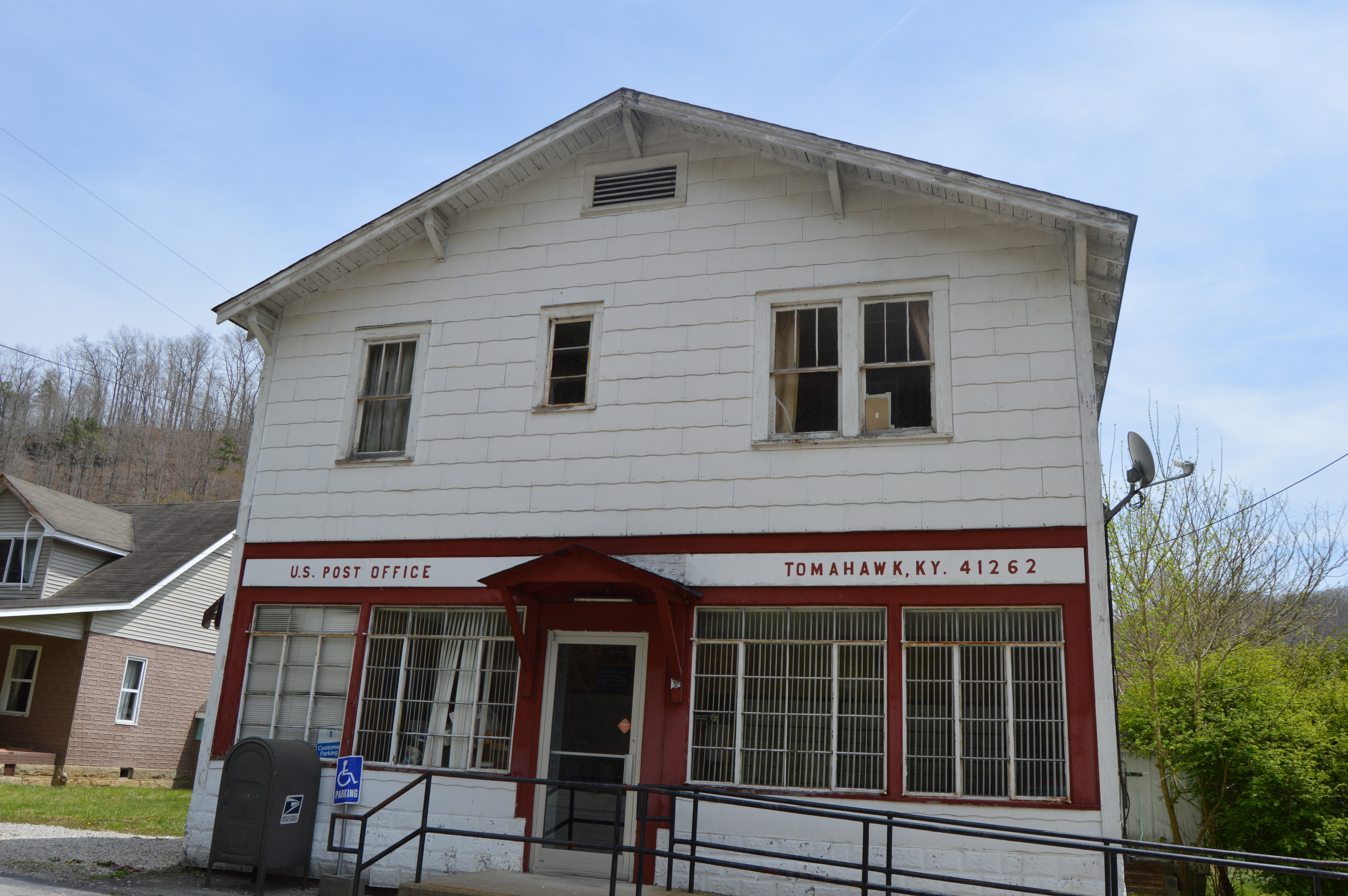
Post office

The post office was established as Wells on August 20, 1886, and named for its first postmaster, Richard M. Wells, according to Kentucky Place Names by Richard M. Rennick. It was closed in 1894, but reopened on November 4, 1898, as Tomahawk for The Tomahawk News, a newspaper then being published in Inez. It now has an estimated population of 1,000, based on voter registration in the Tomahawk precinct. The post office survived in 1975 when the U.S. Postal Service closed nearby offices in Milo and Davisport. In 2012, as part of the Postal Service's nationwide reorganization, the full-time post office building at the forks of Rockcastle Creek and Stafford Fork was closed. But the community retained its name, Zip Code (41262) and some services after it was designated as Kentucky's first Village Post Office. As such, the facility provides free-standing post-office boxes and a mail drop box beside a convenience store, which is authorized to sell stamps and delivery envelopes.

== Facilities ==
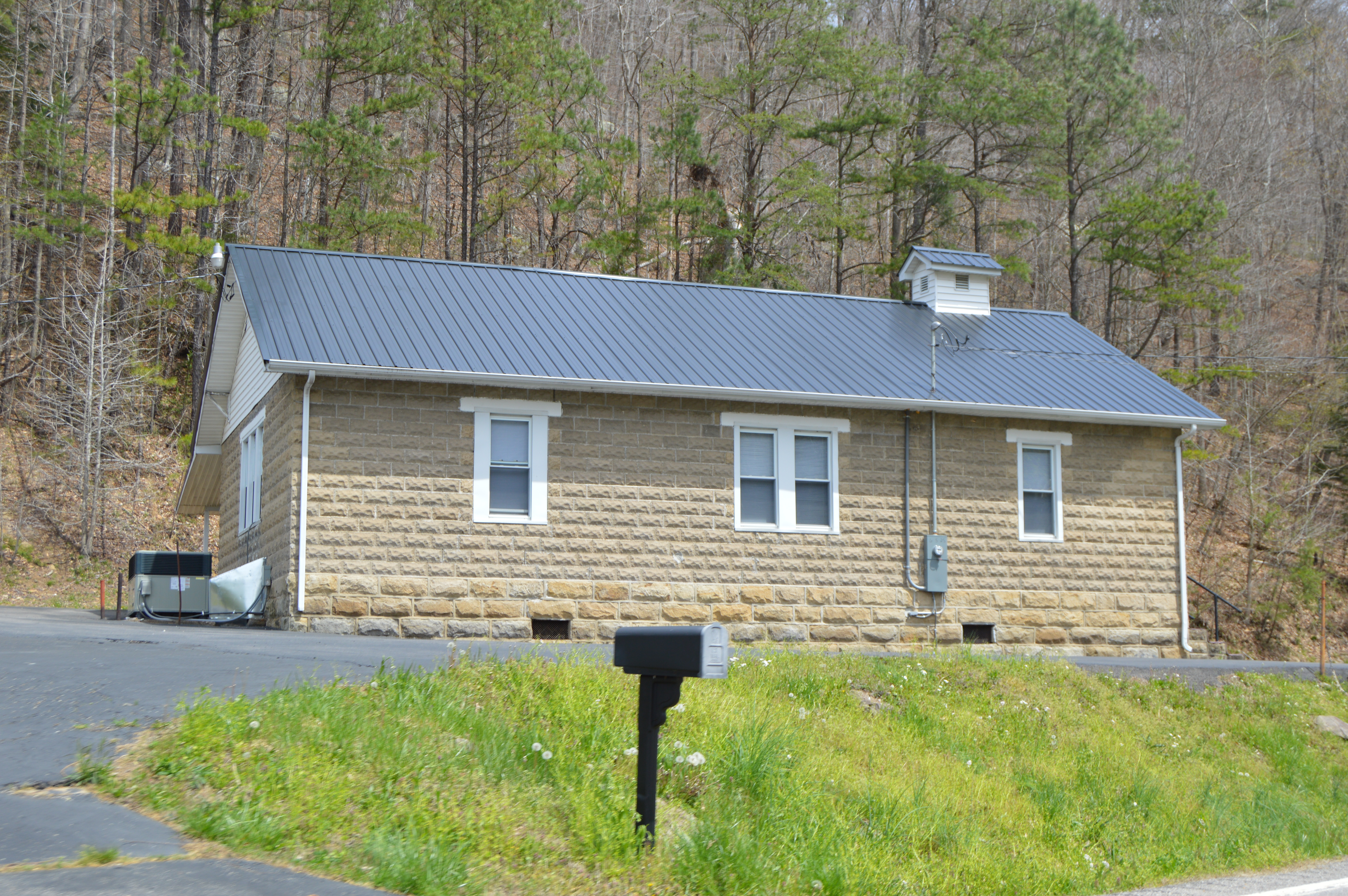
Sulphur Springs United Baptist Church

The community still contains a volunteer fire department, a grocery, a convenience store, an antique/musical instrument store, a car wash, a used-car lot, three churches, a Columbia Gas Co. pumping station and a large furniture store located in the old stone WPA-era Tomahawk Grade School, which was closed and sold in 2002 after the school was consolidated with Grassy Grade School into Eden Elementary School, located on KY 645 near Inez, Kentucky. A large mine-supply company in the community, Banks-Miller Supply, closed in late September 2018.

== "Ritual sacrifice" incident of 1933 ==
Tomahawk became briefly notorious on February 8, 1933, after a local family ritually murdered their mother following a church revival under the mistaken belief they could bring her back to life in three days. Accounts of this incident and subsequent trial were published nationally and internationally, Associated Press articles show.

== Climate ==
The climate in this area is characterized by relatively high temperatures and evenly distributed precipitation throughout the year. According to the Köppen Climate Classification system, Tomahawk has a Humid subtropical climate, abbreviated "Cfa" on climate maps.

Climate data for Tomahawk, Kentucky
Month	Jan	Feb	Mar	Apr	May	Jun	Jul	Aug	Sep	Oct	Nov	Dec	Year
Mean daily maximum °C (°F)	6 (42)	8 (46)	14 (58)	21 (69)	25 (77)	28 (83)	30 (86)	29 (85)	26 (79)	21 (69)	14 (57)	9 (48)	19 (67)
Mean daily minimum °C (°F)	−8 (18)	−8 (18)	−2 (28)	3 (38)	8 (46)	13 (55)	16 (60)	15 (59)	11 (52)	4 (39)	−1 (30)	−5 (23)	4 (39)
Average precipitation mm (inches)	81 (3.2)	76 (3)	110 (4.2)	110 (4.2)	120 (4.8)	110 (4.2)	140 (5.7)	110 (4.3)	86 (3.4)	79 (3.1)	97 (3.8)	99 (3.9)	1,220 (47.9)
Source: Weatherbase
