= West Van Lear, Kentucky =

Unincorporated community in Kentucky, United States

- Unincorporated community
- Location within Kentucky Location within the United States
- Coordinates: 37°47′10″N 82°46′50″W
- Country: United States
- State: Kentucky
- County: Johnson

Area
  - Total: 1.12 sq mi (2.90 km^{2})
  - Land: 1.09 sq mi (2.82 km^{2})
  - Water: 0.035 sq mi (0.09 km^{2})

Population (2020)
  - Total: 768
  - Density: 706.2/sq mi (272.65/km^{2})
- Time zone: UTC-5 (Eastern (EST))
  - Summer (DST): UTC-4 (EDT)
- FIPS code: 21-82056

West Van Lear is an unincorporated community in Johnson County, Kentucky, United States. As of the 2020 census, West Van Lear had a population of 768. Even though it is unincorporated, it has a post office and its own ZIP code (41268). It has a small grocery store, a volunteer fire department, and a community center.

West Van Lear's post office was established on April 29, 1912, with James H. Price as postmaster.

== Demographics ==
Historical population
Census	Pop.	Note	%±
2020	768		—
U.S. Decennial Census
