= Whitehouse, Kentucky =

Unincorporated community in Kentucky, United States

- Unincorporated community
- Location within Kentucky Location within the United States
- Coordinates: 37°52′25″N 82°41′56″W
- Country: United States
- State: Kentucky
- County: Johnson
- Time zone: UTC-5 (Eastern (EST))
  - Summer (DST): UTC-4 (EDT)
- ZIP codes: 41240

Whitehouse is an unincorporated community in Johnson County, Kentucky, United States. In its early years, it was called Mt. Carbon and housed families from two different coal companies, Sandy River Cannel Coal Company and Whitehouse Cannel Coal Company. In 1887, the Ohio and Big Sandy Railroad, bought by Chesapeake and Ohio Railway in 1892, reached the community and named the station "Whitehouse" after a large white house that served as a landmark for riverboats. On April 23, 1887, the community named its post office Myrtle, but in 1901, both the post office and community were renamed Whitehouse, after the railroad station. Before being renamed to Myrtle, the community was named Mt. Carbon. Whitehouse's ZIP code was 41269 but since the post office closure it now uses the zip code for Paintsville 41240.
