= Elna (Japanese company) =

- Industry: Electronics
- Founded: 1937
- Products: Capacitors, PCBs
- Owner: Masao Ito
- Number of employees: 604
- Divisions: Elna America
- Website: Official website

Elna Co. Ltd is a Japanese manufacturer of electrolytic and electric double layer capacitors. It also produces custom printed circuit boards for OEM use. The company took on the name "Elna" when it acquired Elna (electronics navigation) Electronics Co. in March 1968. However, the company was established in 1937 (as Taiyo Tsushin Kogyo 太洋通信工業株式会社 ) , though not under the name "Elna". Elna's headquarters is located in Yokohama, Japan.
