= Boons Camp, Kentucky =

Unincorporated community in Kentucky, United States

- Unincorporated community
- Location within Kentucky Location within the United States
- Coordinates: 37°49′57″N 82°42′4″W
- Country: United States
- State: Kentucky
- County: Johnson
- Elevation: 617 ft (188 m)
- Time zone: UTC-5 (Eastern (EST))
  - Summer (DST): UTC-4 (EDT)
- ZIP codes: 41204
- GNIS feature ID: 487701

Boons Camp is an unincorporated community in Johnson County, Kentucky, United States. The community is named after a camp used by Daniel Boone during the 1790s while he was hunting with the settlers from nearby Blockhouse Bottom. The community's original post office opened on May 16, 1876, with James Mollett as its postmaster.
