= Offutt, Kentucky =

Unincorporated community in Kentucky, United States

- Unincorporated community
- Location within Kentucky Location within the United States
- Coordinates: 37°51′00″N 82°43′47″W
- Country: United States
- State: Kentucky
- County: Johnson
- Elevation: 646 ft (197 m)
- Time zone: UTC-5 (Eastern (EST))
  - Summer (DST): UTC-4 (EDT)
- ZIP codes: 41237
- GNIS feature ID: 509926

Offutt (originally known as Ward City) is an unincorporated community and coal town in Johnson County, Kentucky, United States. The community became known as Offutt during the early 1900s after James Offutt, the president of Rockcastle Lumber Company. The community's ZIP Code is 41237.

Offutt is located at an elevation of 646 feet.
