= Thelma, Kentucky =

Unincorporated community in Kentucky, United States

- Unincorporated community
- Location within Kentucky Location within the United States
- Coordinates: 37°49′09″N 82°45′56″W
- Country: United States
- State: Kentucky
- County: Johnson
- Elevation: 636 ft (194 m)
- Time zone: UTC-5 (Eastern (EST))
  - Summer (DST): UTC-4 (EDT)
- ZIP codes: 41260
- GNIS feature ID: 509201

Thelma is an unincorporated community in Johnson County, Kentucky, United States. The community was originally known as Buskirk, after a local family. But, when the community received its first post office on June 5, 1905, it was renamed Thelma after the daughter of Warren Meek. Meek was a successful pioneer in the newspaper field in the Big Sandy Valley.

Thelma's ZIP code is 41260.

Thelma is located at an elevation of 636 feet.
