= Meally, Kentucky =

Unincorporated community in Kentucky, United States

- Unincorporated community
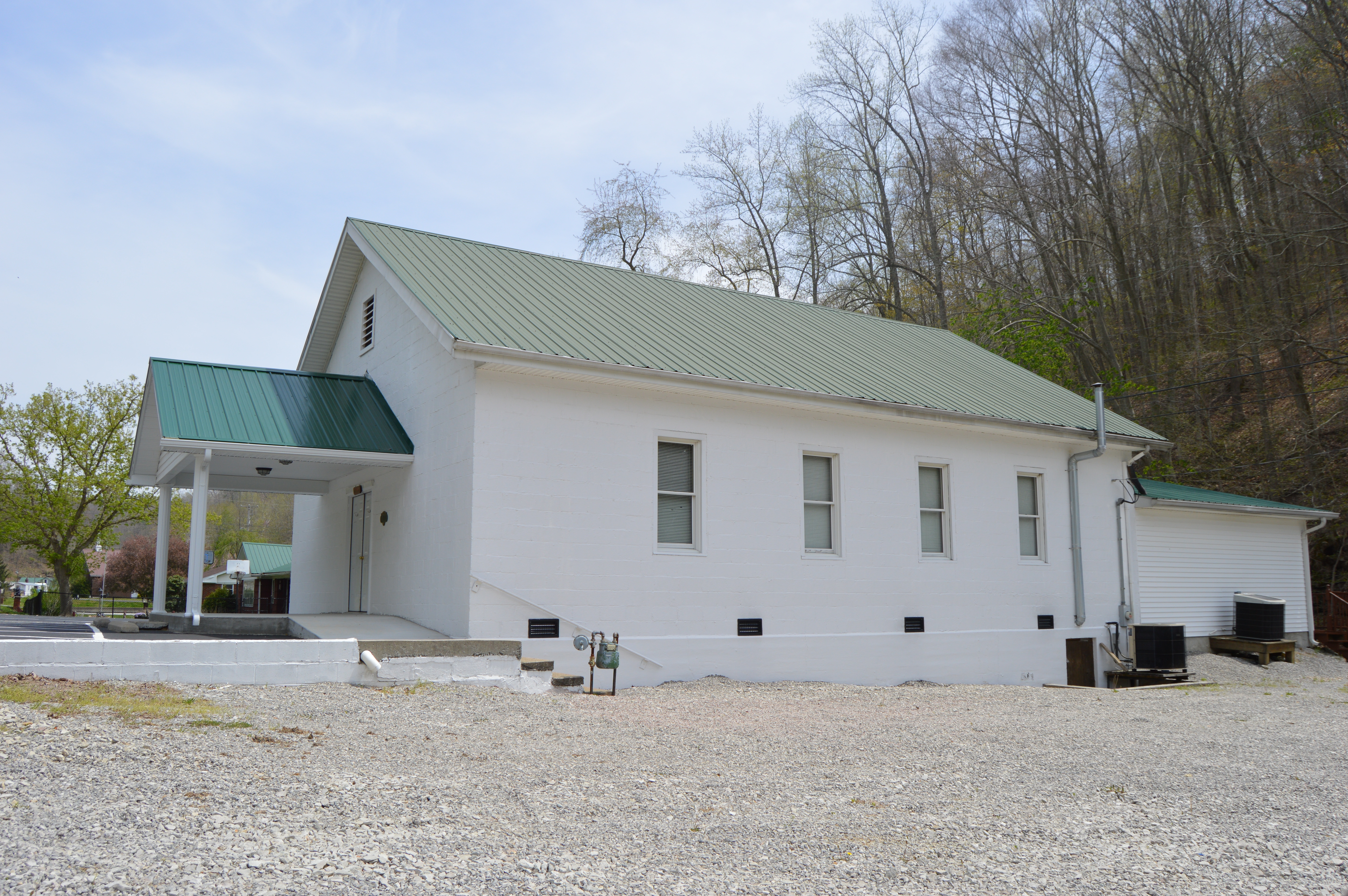
- Buffalo United Baptist Church

- Location within Kentucky Location within the United States
- Coordinates: 37°47′48″N 82°44′24″W
- Country: United States
- State: Kentucky
- County: Johnson
- Elevation: 620 ft (190 m)
- Time zone: UTC-5 (Eastern (EST))
  - Summer (DST): UTC-4 (EDT)
- ZIP codes: 41234
- GNIS feature ID: 509201

Meally is an unincorporated community in Johnson County, Kentucky, United States. The community's ZIP code is 41234. Meally is located at an elevation of 620 feet (189 m).
