= Johnson Central High School =

Coordinates: 37.8217604°N 82.8165502°W

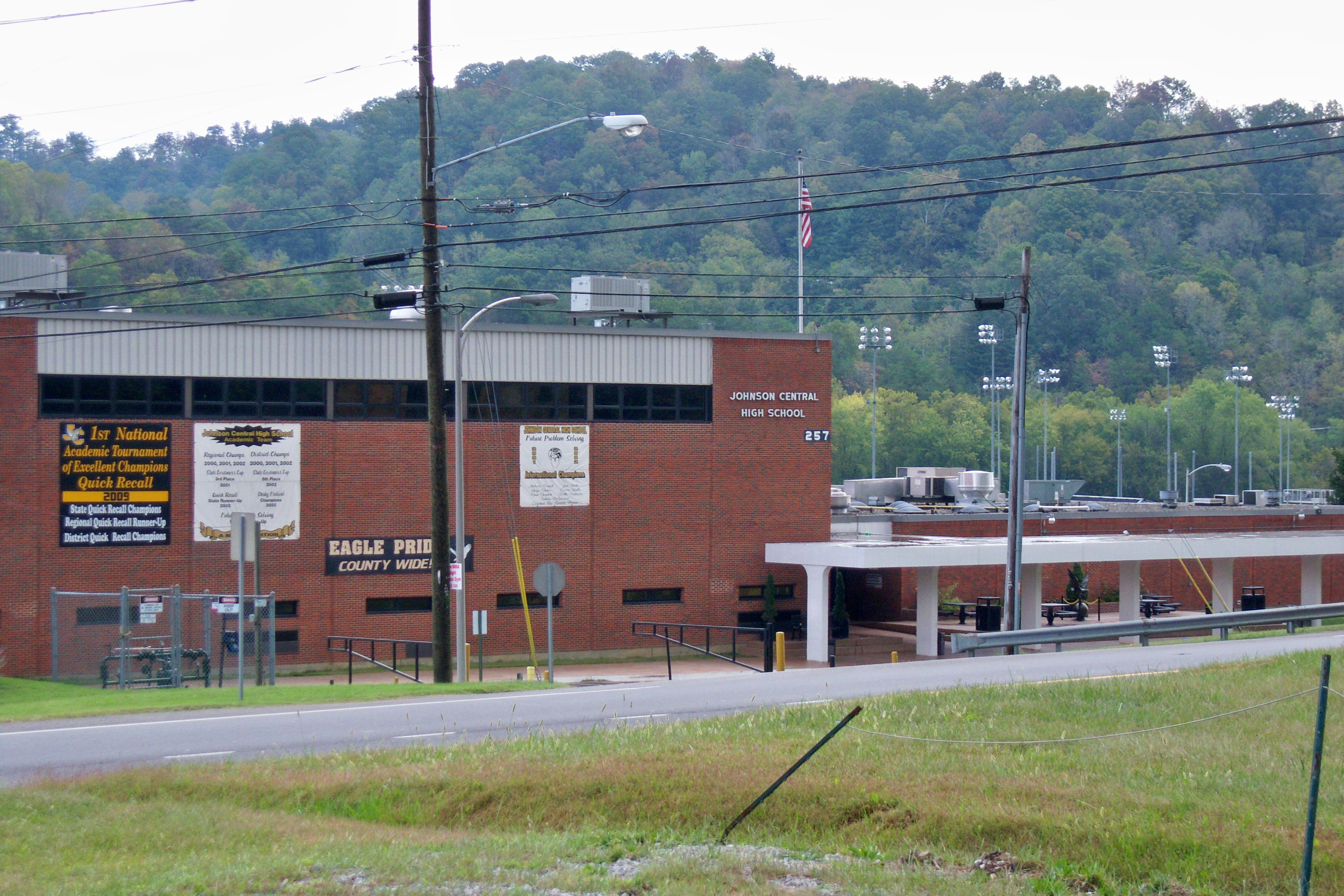

Location
- 257 North Mayo Trail; Paintsville, KY 41240

Information
- School type: Public
- Founded: 1968
- Superintendent: Thom Cochran
- Principal: Monica Daniel
- Teaching staff: 71.90 (FTE)
- Grades: 9–12
- Enrollment: 913 (2023-2024)
- Student to teacher ratio: 12.70
- Language: English
- Area: Eastern Kentucky
- Colors: Black █ and gold █
- Nickname: Golden Eagles
- Rival: Paintsville High School, Paul G. Blazer High School
- Website: www.johnson.k12.ky.us/o/johnson-central-high-school

Johnson Central High School is a public secondary school located at 257 North Mayo Trail on the northwest side of Paintsville, Kentucky, United States. The school serves as the Johnson County School District's consolidated high school.

As of the 2015–16 school year, enrollment was 1,048 in grades 9–12. The school was featured as a U.S. News & World Report America's Top High School, maintaining the Bronze Award since 2007.

== History ==
During the early 1960s, the school board began to consider the idea of a consolidated high school in Johnson County. School administrators began exploring the subject with students, teachers, and parents. In 1965, the subject was voted upon and it was decided to create a tax levy for the construction of a new high school. On September 10, 1968, Van Lear High School, Meade Memorial High School, Flat Gap High School, and Oil Springs High School were all consolidated in order to form Johnson Central High School.

== Academics ==
The school is home to a new Career Technology Center, consisting of the business, vocational, and agriculture classrooms. All classrooms are now labeled "21st Century Classrooms," meaning they have plasma televisions, infrared microphones, surround-sound speaker systems, and 360-degree full-color projectors.

The school is home to a Freshman Academy, a large Honors Program, and several Advanced Placement courses. In addition, several dual-credit classes are offered, giving students the chance to earn college credit while in high school. The dual-credit programs are offered in connection with Big Sandy Community and Technical College, University of Pikeville and the University of Kentucky.

JCHS's Future Problem Solving team is the only school, internationally, to win five international championship titles, with the most recent in 2013. Its academic team was runner-up in the Governor's Cup in 2007, 2009 and 2010, and 3rd in 2001, 2003, 2008, 2012 and 2015. The academic team has won numerous district and regional titles, and has placed in the top eight every year since 2003. This team is well known nationally, especially after its 2009 national championship at the National Tournament of Academic Excellence, in which they represented the state of Kentucky.

JCHS was featured as WSAZ's first 'Cool School', gaining that credit in 2007.

== Extracurricular activities ==
Johnson Central High School is well known for its football, basketball, baseball, wrestling, Future Problem Solving and academic teams. In addition, it hosts several successful clubs including FFA, FBLA, DECA, HOSA, FCCLA, Beta, SkillsUSA, STLP, and FEA. Its DECA Quiz Bowl team were state champions in 2007, 2008, and 2009.

The rivalry between Johnson Central High School and Paintsville High School, both in the same county, is considered to be one of the biggest high school rivalries in the state. The rivalry would always acculminate in a football game known as the Apple Bowl, a festivity associated with the Kentucky Apple Festival, but the event was ended.

Other extracurricular activities available at Johnson Central include marching band, pep band, stage band, concert band, golf, tennis, wrestling, soccer, bowling, volleyball, and honor choir.

== Athletics ==
Johnson Central is a regional power house in basketball, winning four consecutive region titles from 2012 to 2015 under Coach Tommy McKenzie. The football team has won an average of over 10 games a year in the last 15 seasons. In 2015 JCHS went to the State Title game, only to lose to the South Warren Spartans. The Golden Eagles returned to the Class 4A state title game in 2016, defeating the Franklin-Simpson Wildcats 48–0 to capture the school's first state athletic championship in a team sport. In 2019 the football team made its 5th straight State Championship appearance and second State Championship under coach Jim Matney by defeating Boyle County 21–20. The wrestling team under coach Jim Matney won its 13th consecutive Regional championships in a row in 2021. Winning State Dual Championships in both 2019 and 2021 and State Runner-up in 2013 and 2020. Matney died on September 28, 2021, at age 62 due to COVID-19, with Jesse Peck taking the position as Head Football Coach, while Blake Gamble took the position as the new JC Wrestling Coach.

== Notable alumni ==
- Willie Blair – former MLB pitcher
- Chris Stapleton – Grammy Award-winning singer and songwriter
