= Johnson County School District (Kentucky) =

School district in Kentucky, United States

Location
- Johnson County, KY United States

District information
- Type: Public
- Motto: Every child. Every day.
- Grades: Pre-K through 12
- Established: 1873
- Superintendent: Thom Cochran
- Budget: $30,505,000 (expenditures)

Students and staff
- Students: 3,701 (2008)
- Teachers: 320 (2008)
- Student–teacher ratio: 13.9 (2008)

Other information
- Newspaper: Eagle Express
- Website: www.johnson.kyschools.us

The Johnson County School District is a public school district located in Johnson County, Kentucky. The district operates nine schools and has a total enrollment of 3,701. The Johnson County Board of Education is located in Paintsville.

== Administration ==
=== Board of education ===
- Thom Cochran, superintendent
- Bob Hutchison, chairman
- Brad Frisby, member
- Melvin Vanhoose, vice chairman
- William Fraley, member
- Bruce Aaron Davis, member
- Valarie Blair, board secretary
- Misty Goble, treasurer

== Elementary schools ==
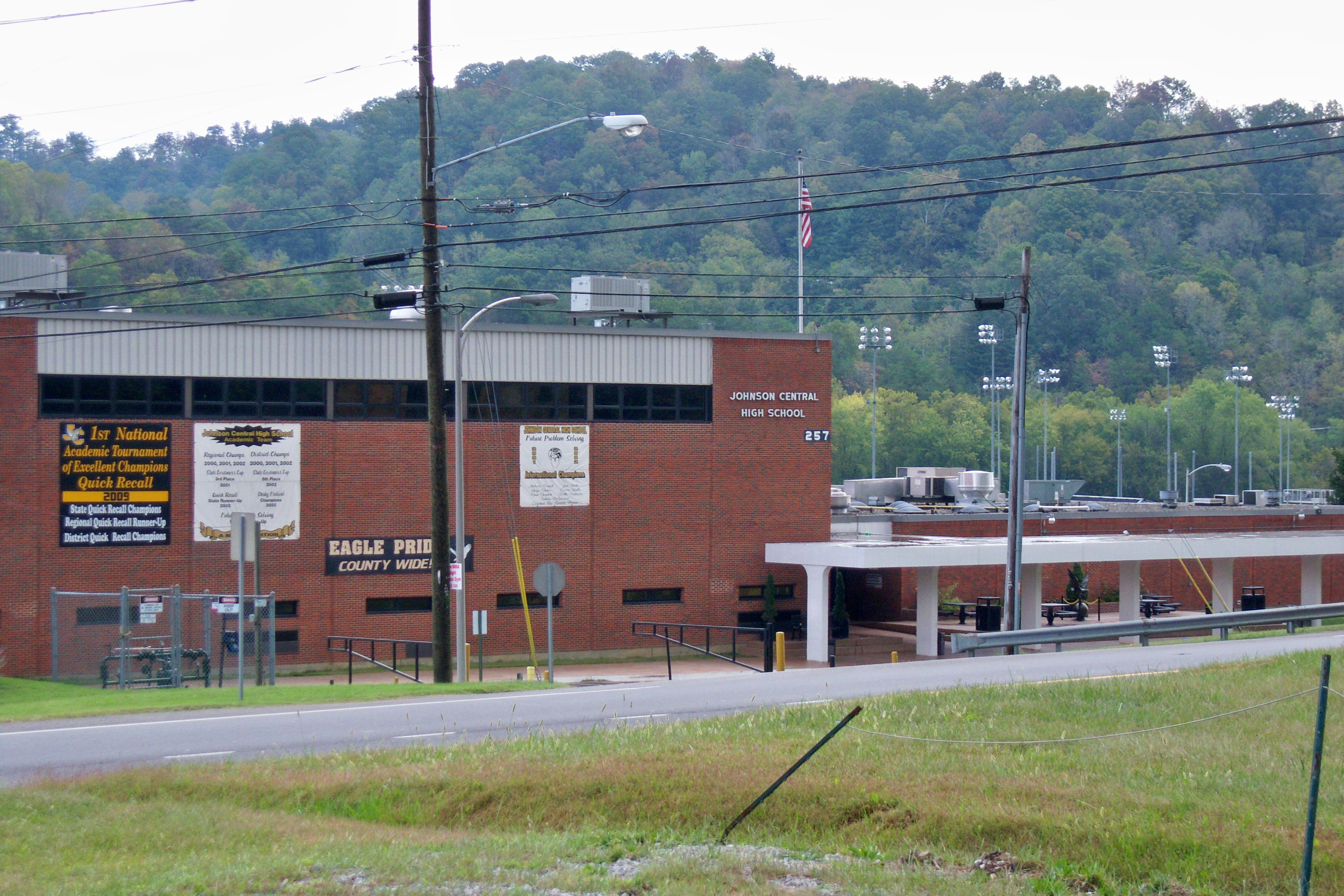
Johnson Central High School

- Central Elementary School - Paintsville
- Flat Gap Elementary School - Flat Gap
- Highland Elementary School - Staffordsville
- Porter Elementary School - Hager Hill
- W.R. Castle Memorial Elementary School

== Middle schools ==
- Johnson County Middle School - Paintsville

== High schools ==
- Johnson Central High School - Paintsville

== Alternative schools ==
- Johnson County Alternative School - Paintsville
