= ZIP Code Tabulation Area =

U.S. Census area of all places with the same ZIP Code

ZIP Code Tabulation Areas (ZCTAs) are statistical entities developed by the United States Census Bureau for tabulating summary statistics. These were introduced with the Census 2000 and continued with the 2010 Census and 5 year American Community Survey datasets. They were updated again for the 2020 census. This new entity was developed to overcome the difficulties in precisely defining the land area covered by each ZIP code. Defining the extent of an area is necessary in order to tabulate census data for that area.

ZCTAs are generalized area representations of the United States Postal Service (USPS) ZIP code service areas, but are not the same as ZIP codes. Individual USPS ZIP codes can cross state, place, county, census tract, census block group and census block boundaries, so the Census Bureau asserts that "there is no correlation between ZIP codes and Census Bureau geography". Moreover, the USPS frequently realigns, merges, or splits ZIP codes to meet changing needs. These changes are usually not reflected in the annual TIGER releases. Each ZCTA is constructed by aggregating the Census 2020 blocks whose addresses use a given ZIP code. In assembling census statistical units to create ZCTAs, the Census Bureau took the ZIP code used by the majority of addresses in each census unit at the time the data was compiled. As a result, some addresses end up with a ZCTA code that is different from their ZIP code. ZCTAs are not developed for ZIP codes that comprise only a small number of addresses. Several ZCTAs represent ZIPs that no longer exist due to realignment by the USPS.

There are approximately 42,000 ZIP Codes and 32,000 ZCTAs. The reason that there is not one ZCTA for every ZIP Code is that only populated areas are included in the Census data, and thus ZIP Codes that only serve PO Boxes have no corresponding ZCTA.

== See also ==
- Census-designated place
- ZIP Code
