= Mary Elliott Flanery =

American politician (1867–1933)

- Born: Mary Elliott; April 27, 1867; Carter County, Kentucky
- Died: July 19, 1933 (aged 66); Catlettsburg, Kentucky
- Education: University of Kentucky
- Occupations: Politician, Suffragist, Journalist
- Spouse: William Flanery (m. 1893)

Member of the Kentucky House of Representatives from the 89th district
- In office January 1, 1922 – January 1, 1924
- Preceded by: Daniel Vose
- Succeeded by: Otto C. Gartin

Mary Elliott Flanery (April 27, 1867 – July 19, 1933) was an American Progressive Era social reformer, suffragist, politician, and journalist who is best remembered as the first woman elected to the Kentucky General Assembly and first woman elected to a state legislature south of the Mason–Dixon line. Flanery was an advocate for equal rights for women, and actively worked to pass legislation that would give women the right to vote.

== Family and early life ==
Mary Elliott, daughter of Benjamin Franklin Elliott and Nancy (Kegley) Elliott, was born April 27, 1867, in a part of Carter County, Kentucky, that would later become Elliott County, Kentucky. After completing her schooling at University of Charleston in West Virginia and the University of Kentucky, she was a public school teacher.

=== Family ===
Mary married William "Harvey" Flanery on June 28, 1893, and moved with him to Ann Arbor, Michigan. The Flanery family moved to Pikeville, Kentucky, in 1896 for Harvey to work for Northern Coal and Coke as an attorney.

Harvey and Mary had five children together; Sue, Merle, Dawn, Dew, and John.

== Journalism and literary interests ==
While residing in Pikeville, Mary Flanery began a career as a writer. From 1904 until 1926, she worked as a journalist for the Ashland Daily Independent. She wrote a column called "Impressions of Kentucky's Legislature," and she advocated for legislation as a means for social reform.

Flanery personally supported the publication of books by female African-American poet Effie Waller Smith, who lived and worked in Pike County, Kentucky.

== Women's rights advocate ==
Flanery was a member of the Kentucky Equal Right Association, and actively worked for women to have the right to vote. She worked to improve the lives of women through reform of suffrage, marriage, and divorce laws.

== Kentucky legislator ==
After women gained suffrage in Kentucky, in 1921, Flanery ran as the Democratic party candidate for a seat in the Kentucky House of Representatives from the 89th District representing Boyd County, Kentucky, and won by a 250-vote margin. When Flanery took her seat in the lower house of the General Assembly in January 1922, she was the first female state legislator elected in Kentucky and the first female legislator elected south of the Mason–Dixon line.

As an legislator, Flanery continued her advocacy for women's rights. She urged her colleagues to change legislation about marriage and divorce, and to implement the federal Shepard-Towner Maternity Act, a progressive era program that provided medical care to pregnant women and their children.

Flanery's time in the General Assembly ended with an unsuccessful campaign for Secretary of State in 1923. She was defeated by another female trailblazer, Emma Guy Cromwell, who was the first female to hold a statewide office. Flanery stayed active in politics and was a delegate to the Democratic National Convention in 1924.

== Later life, death, and legacy ==
Flanery was an active member of the General Federation of Women's Clubs of Kentucky. She was a member of the Daughters of the Revolution and in 1926, she founded the John Milton Elliott chapter of the United Daughters of the Confederacy.

=== Death ===
Flanery died at her residence, Elliot Hall, in Cattlettsburg on July 19, 1933, and was buried at Ashland Cemetery in Ashland, Kentucky.

=== Legacy ===
After Flanery became the first woman elected to the Kentucky State legislature, she was honored by the Kentucky Historical Society as Kentucky's Most Prominent Female. Mary Elliott Flanery is remembered today as a trailblazer for her work as a social reformer and her advocacy for women's rights through her work as a journalist and politician. In 1963, the Kentucky General Assembly honored Flanery by placing a bronze plaque at her desk in the Kentucky House of Representatives. In 2005, Kentucky Commission on Women recognized her by adding her portrait to the "Kentucky Women Remembered" exhibit at the Kentucky State Capitol building.
