= Model Cities Program =

US government social program, 1965–1974

Agency overview
- Formed: November 3, 1966
- Dissolved: August 22, 1974
- Superseding agency: Community Development Block Grant
- Jurisdiction: United States Federal
- Headquarters: Washington, D.C.
- Minister responsible: Robert C. Weaver, Secretary of Housing and Urban Development
- Parent agency: Department of Housing and Urban Development

The Model Cities Program was an element of U.S. President Lyndon Johnson's Great Society and War on Poverty. The concept was presented by labor leader Walter Reuther to President Johnson in an off-the-record White House meeting on May 20, 1965. In 1966, new legislation led to the more than 150 five-year-long, Model Cities experiments to develop new anti-poverty programs and alternative forms of municipal government. Model Cities represented a new approach that emphasized social program as well as physical renewal, and sought to coordinate the actions of numerous government agencies in a multifaceted attack on the complex roots of urban poverty. The ambitious federal urban aid program succeeded in fostering a new generation of mostly black urban leaders. The program ended in 1974.

== Program development ==
Authorized November 3, 1966, by the Demonstration Cities and Metropolitan Development Act of 1966, the program ended in 1974. Model Cities originated in response to several concerns of the mid-1960s. Widespread urban violence, disillusionment with existing urban renewal programs, and bureaucratic difficulties in the first years of the War on Poverty led to calls for reform of federal programs. The Model Cities initiative created a new program at the Department of Housing and Urban Development (HUD) intended to improve coordination of existing urban programs. Several cities including Detroit, Oakland, Newark and Camden received funding. The program's initial goals emphasized comprehensive planning, emphasizing not just rebuilding, but also rehabilitation, social-service delivery, and citizen participation. In 1969, the Nixon administration officially changed course; however in the majority of cities, citizen-participation mechanisms continued to play an important role in local decision-making.

Other evaluations have identified both failures and success in the Model Cities program, with its limited effectiveness attributed to a combination of complicated bureaucracy, inadequate funding, and competing agendas at the local level.

== Specific cities ==
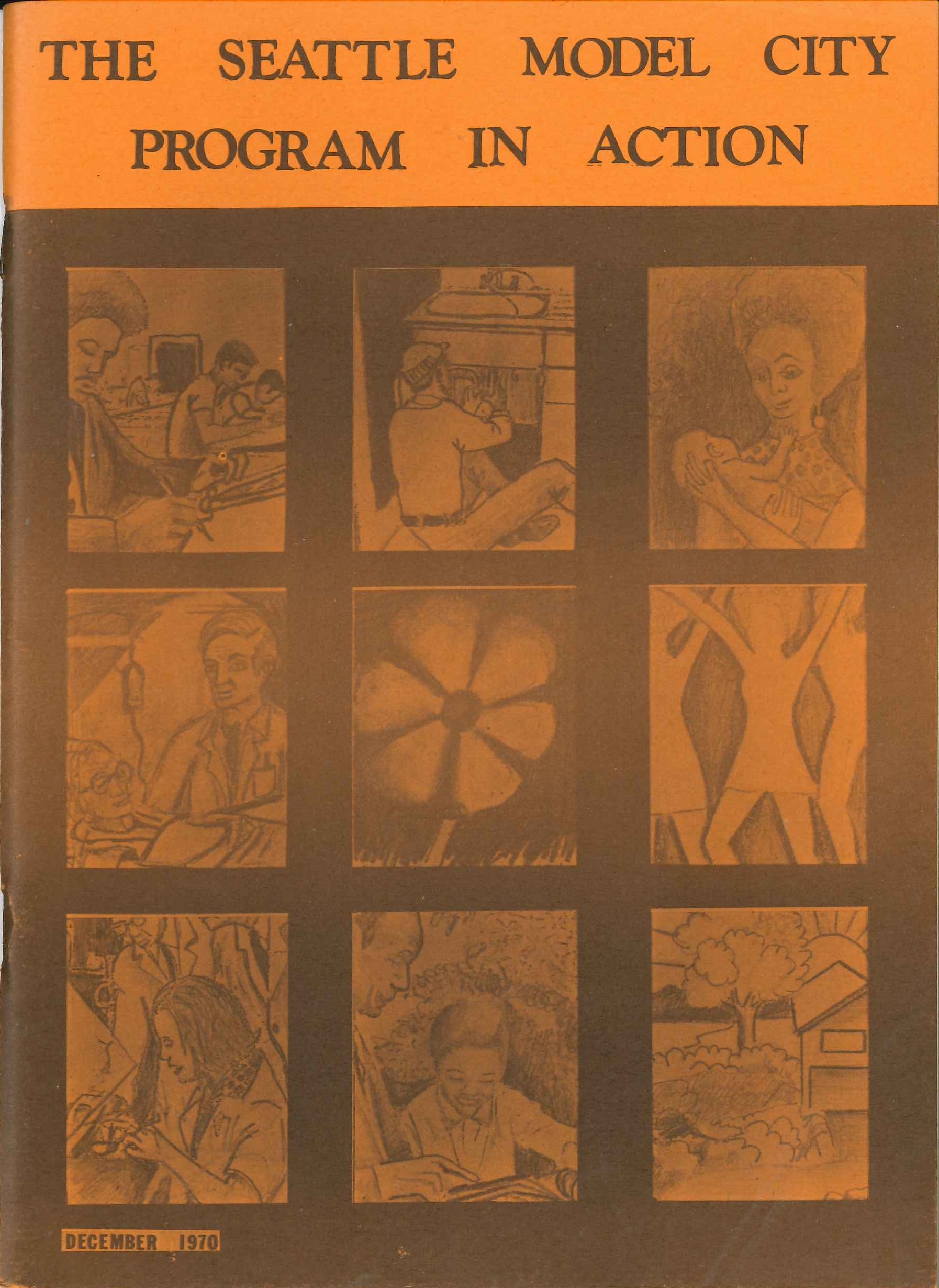
Report of the Seattle Model City Program, December 1970

Smithville, Tennessee, the smallest city to receive such funding, is an example of a city that benefited from the Model Cities Project. Congressman Joe L. Evins secured his hometown's inclusion in the project. Several buildings in downtown Smithville, such as the Dekalb County Court House and the Smithville City Hall, were built from funds from the Model Cities Project. They are still in use as of 2026, and make up a good portion of the city's downtown landscape.

Pikeville, Kentucky was the location of one of the biggest Model Cities projects. The Pikeville Cut-Through is 1,300 ft (400 m) wide, 3,700 ft (1,100 m) long, and 523 ft (159 m) deep. The project was completed in 1987 following 14 years of work for a total cost of $77.6 million. The cut-through provides a path for a four-lane highway, a CSX railroad line, and the Levisa Fork of the Big Sandy River, which snaked through the downtown area, to eliminate almost yearly flooding. The river bed then was reclaimed by depositing fill from the cut-through into the old riverbed, significantly increasing the available space for development within the city.

McAlester, Oklahoma, represented by Speaker of the House Carl Albert, was another Model Cities site. There, the program was instrumental in acquiring the land for a regional hospital, among other projects.

Detroit, Michigan was one of the largest Model Cities projects. Mayor Jerome P Cavanaugh was the only elected official to serve on President Johnson's task force. Detroit received widespread acclaim for its leadership in the program, which used $490 million to try to turn a 9 sq mi (23 km^{2}) section of the city (with 134,000 inhabitants) into a model city.

In Atlanta there was a battle between competing visions. The city's political and business elite, and city planners, along with Atlanta's black middle class, wanted the federal funding to accelerate the economic growth of the entire city. They sought to protect the central business district property values from nearby slums and to construct new revenue-generating structures. However local community activists rallied poor residents in opposition to these plans, arguing that federal renewal funding should be used to replace deteriorating housing stock, whether with new public housing or with low-cost housing built by private developers.
