= Pikeville Medical Center =

Geography
- Location: 911 Bypass Road, Pikeville, Kentucky, United States
- Coordinates: 37.469823°N 82.521541°W

Organization
- Care system: Private
- Funding: Non-profit hospital
- Type: Teaching
- Affiliated university: University of Pikeville Kentucky College of Osteopathic Medicine

Services
- Emergency department: Level II Trauma Center
- Beds: 340

History
- Opened: December 24, 1924

Links
- Website: www.pikevillehospital.org
- Lists: Hospitals in Kentucky

Pikeville Medical Center (formerly known as Pikeville Methodist Hospital) is a 340-bed medical facility located in Pikeville, Kentucky.

== History ==
Pikeville Medical Center treated its first patient on December 25, 1924. The original facility had 50 beds, but by May 1940, the hospital was expanded to a 90-bed facility. Pikeville's rapid growth called for another expansion in 1952, which brought the bed capacity to 135.

In 1955, the United Mine Workers of America built a second hospital in the city in order to treat its members. Shortly afterwards, the Methodist Hospital of Kentucky purchased the hospital. This structure, known as the Miners' Building, is the oldest section of Pikeville Medical Center.

In 1957 and 1963 severe flooding devastated Pikeville and Pike County. The hospital not only treated patients with medical conditions, but provided shelter for flood victims who had become homeless.

In 1971, it became apparent that Pikeville Medical Center needed to be expanded once again in order to adequately serve the residents of Eastern Kentucky. On Christmas Eve, 1971, the new 8 story Elliott Tower officially opened.

Due to the lack of a comprehensive cancer center in Eastern Kentucky, the institution opened the Leonard Lawson Cancer Center in June 1996. Today, it still remains one of the few comprehensive cancer centers in the eastern part of the state.

In 1998, May Tower was constructed at a cost of $75 million and was dedicated on December 18, 2000.

During 2009–2011, Pikeville Medical Center was named the National Hospital of the Year by the American Alliance of Healthcare Providers three consecutive times.

== Today ==
Today, Pikeville Medical Center is the largest hospital in southeastern Kentucky. As of 2018, the hospital consists of 1.6 million square feet spread across 43 facilities, is licensed for 340 beds, and has approximately 3,000 employees.

On February 12, 2010, Pikeville Medical Center received a $44.6 million loan from the federal government that permitted the construction of a new 11-story clinic and parking garage. An opening ceremony for the 235,362 square feet (21,865.8 m^{2}) clinic and 1,162 space parking structure was held on April 10, 2014.

== Medical services ==
Services offered include cardiac, medical, surgical, pediatric, rehabilitative, cancer, neurological, pain care, wound care and home care. It is accredited through the Joint Commission on Accreditation of Healthcare Organizations (JCAHO).
