= List of Appalachian Americans =

This is a list of notable Appalachian Americans, including both natives of the Appalachian Region and members of the Appalachian diaspora outside of Appalachia. Appalachians are an unrecognized demographic of the United States Census Bureau, but due to various factors have developed a unique culture and Dialect.

Appalachian Americans include Americans from the region of Appalachia in the United States, stretching from the southern to the central Appalachian Mountain range and parts of the surrounding plateau, and descendants of Appalachian Americans.

== Actors ==
- Joyce DeWitt (born 1949), actress born in Wheeling, West Virginia. Best known as "Janet" from the sitcom, "Three's Company".
- John Corbett (born 1961), actor and singer who was born and raised in Wheeling, West Virginia. He starred in " My Big Fat Greek Wedding."

== Folk heroes and figures ==
- Daniel Boone (1734–1820), pioneer, explorer
- Davy Crockett (1786–1836), frontiersman, soldier, politician
- John Gordon (1759–1819), pioneer, trader, planter, militia captain
- Devil Anse Hatfield (1839–1921), patriarch of the Hatfield family of the Hatfield–McCoy feud
- John Henry, folk hero, steel driver

== Music ==
- Ernest "Tennessee Ernie" Ford (1919–1991), country, pop, and gospel singer and television host
- Jean Ritchie (1922–2015), folk singer, songwriter, and Appalachian dulcimer player
- Doc Watson (1923–2012), guitarist, songwriter, and singer
- Carter Stanley (1925–1966), bluegrass guitarist, songwriter, and singer
- Hazel Dickens (1925–2012), double bassist, guitarist, songwriter, and singer
- Ralph Stanley (1927–2016), bluegrass banjoist, songwriter, and singer
- Bill Withers (1938–2020), singer-songwriter
- Ronnie Milsap (born 1943), country music singer and pianist
- Dolly Parton (1946–2026), singer, songwriter, multi-instrumentalist, actress, author, businesswoman, and humanitarian
- Ricky Skaggs (born 1954), bluegrass multi-instrumentalist, singer-songwriter, and producer
- Keith Whitley (1954–1989), country music singer-songwriter
- Dwight Yoakam (born 1956), country music singer-songwriter, actor, and filmmaker
- Patty Loveless (born 1957), country music singer-songwriter
- Eric Church (born 1977), singer-songwriter
- Sturgill Simpson (born 1978), country music singer-songwriter
- Chris Stapleton (born 1978), country music singer-songwriter and guitarist
- Earl Scruggs (1924–2012), bluegrass musician and banjo player noted for popularizing a three-finger picking style, now called "Scruggs style”
- Loretta Lynn (1932–2022), country music singer-songwriter
- Luke Combs (born 1990), singer, songwriter
- Tyler Childers (born 1991), singer-songwriter

== Military ==
- Francis Gracey Childers (1860–1921), general, businessman, Tennessee State Representative
- Thomas Jonathan "Stonewall" Jackson (1824–1863), United States military leader serving in the Mexican–American War, and later a prominent Confederate military leader during the American Civil War
- Alvin York (1887–1964), highly-decorated United States soldier serving in World War I, receiving the Medal of Honor as well as numerous other awards from France, Italy, and Montenegro
- Chuck Yeager (1923–2020), USAF Pilot that broke the sound barrier. Served in WWII, Korea and Vietnam. Awards include: Distinguished Flying Cross (3), Bronze Star, Distinguished Service Medal Silver Star (2), Distinguished Service Medal Legion of Merit (2) and a Purple Heart. He was inducted into the International Air & Space Hall of Fame.

== Politicians ==
- Abraham Lincoln (1809–1865), 16th president of the United States, serving during the American Civil War
- Francis Harrison Pierpont (1814–1899), governor of the Restored Government of Virginia during the American Civil War and of Virginia at the beginning of the Reconstruction era
- Thomas Woodrow Wilson (1856–1924), 28th president of the United States, serving during World War I
- Charles Gates Dawes (1865–1951), banker, general, diplomat, composer, and 30th vice president of the United States under Calvin Coolidge
- Jim Broyhill (1927–2023), businessman, United States representative, United States senator
- Joe Manchin (born 1947), United States senator, politician, businessman
- JD Vance (born 1984), 50th vice president of the United States

== Religion ==
- Francis Asbury (1745–1816), Methodist Episcopal bishop

== Sports ==
- Roy Williams (born 1950), college basketball coach, 3-time NCAA champion
- Jerry West (1938–2024), professional basketball player, NBA champion, Medal of Freedom recipient
- Jennifer Azzi (born 1968), professional basketball player, gold medalist
- Katie Smith (born 1974), retired professional women's basketball player, 3-time gold medalist, Women's Basketball Hall of Fame
- Madison Bumgarner (born 1989), professional baseball player (SP), 3-time World Series champion, World Series MVP

== Writers, poets, and literature ==
- Earl Hamner Jr. (1923–2016), author, producer
- Silas House (born 1971), author, journalist, Grammy finalist
- Emma Bell Miles (1879–1919), writer, poet, artist
- Effie Waller Smith (1879–1960), poet
- Thomas Wolfe (1900–1938), author
- Barbara Kingsolver, (born 1955), author
