= The Daily Independent (Ashland newspaper) =

Morning newspaper

- Type: Daily newspaper
- Format: Broadsheet
- Owner: CNHI
- Editor: Aaron Snyder
- General manager: Ashley Fletcher
- Founded: December 17, 1896; 129 years ago
- Language: English
- Headquarters: 1544 Winchester Avenue; Ashland, Kentucky 41101 United States
- Circulation: 11,000 Daily
- Price: USD 2.00 daily, 3.00 Saturday/Sunday “Weekend Edition”
- Website: dailyindependent.com

The Daily Independent (also known as The Independent Weekend Edition and formerly known as The Independent from 2003 to 2015) is a morning newspaper covering the city of Ashland and surrounding areas of Boyd County, Kentucky. Previously published daily, the print schedule was reduced to five days a week (Mondays, Wednesdays, Thursdays, Fridays, and Saturdays as a "Weekend Edition") in April 2020. Since February 2026, it now publishes three days a week (Tuesdays, Thursdays, Saturdays). It is owned by CNHI. It does not publish on Christmas Day.

Launched December 17, 1896 as the Tri-State Independent Col. G. F. Friel of nearby Catlettsburg, Kentucky, the newspaper moved to 12th Street and Greenup Avenue in Ashland in 1900 as the Ashland Daily Independent; it absorbed the Ashland Commercial in the move. The first publication after the move was on December 17. The offices later relocated to 17th Street two years later, when it purchased the Ashland Daily News and discontinued it in that year. In 1920, it founded the Sunday Independent, and five years later, it doubled the size of its headquarters on 17th Street. In July 2025, the offices relocated to Winchester Avenue, inside the Community Trust Bank building.

After years of publishing in the afternoon on weekdays (and morning on weekends), The Independent switched to all-morning publication in May 2003, and dropped the "Daily" and "Sunday" from its nameplate. The newspaper's Website, however, retains the old name as part of its URL. However, as of 2015, the newspaper brought back "The Daily Independent" and "The Sunday Independent" namesake, following a redesign. "The Sunday Independent" namesake was dropped again in April 2020, following the shift to printing a "Weekend Edition" on Saturdays.

Colonel B.F. Forgey, an Ohio native who bought half an interest in the paper in 1910, is credited with guiding the paper's growth until his death in 1952. The newspaper continued to be privately owned until Ottaway Community Newspapers bought it in 1979, selling it to CNHI in 2002. The circulation in 1920 was 3,500 but increased to 17,000 by 1954 and peaked at 25,000 in 1980.
