= Emma Guy Cromwell =

American politician

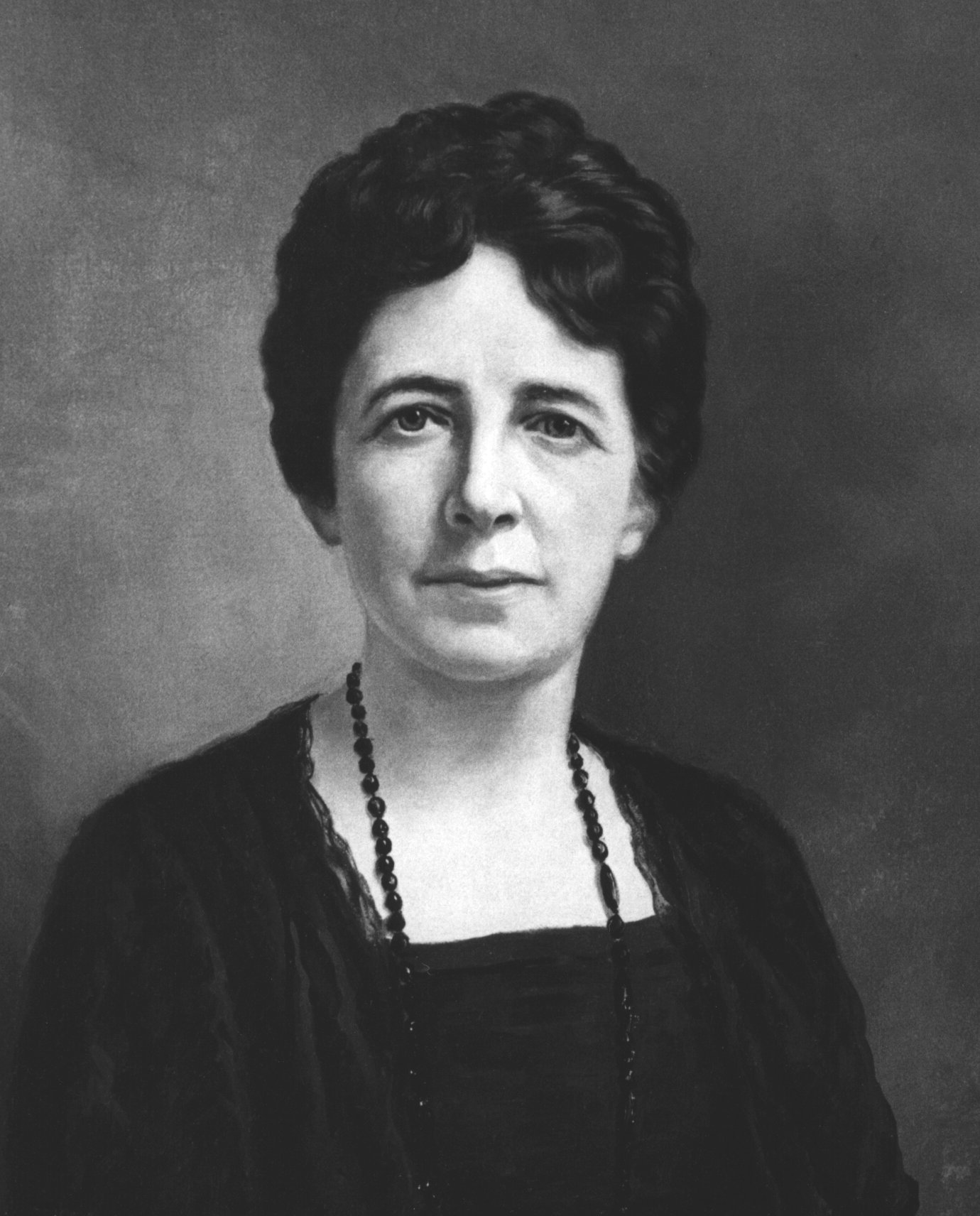

21st Treasurer of Kentucky
- In office January 2, 1928 – January 4, 1932
- Governor: Flem D. Sampson; Ruby Laffoon
- Preceded by: Edward Blan Dishman
- Succeeded by: Elam Huddleston

62nd Secretary of State of Kentucky
- In office January 7, 1924 – January 2, 1928
- Governor: William J. Fields; Flem D. Sampson
- Preceded by: Fred A. Vaughn
- Succeeded by: Ella Lewis

Personal details
- Born: September 28, 1865 Simpson County, Kentucky
- Died: July 19, 1952 (aged 86) Frankfort, Kentucky
- Spouse: William F. Cromwell
- Children: William Foree
- Parent(s): Benjamin Ashley (or Ashley Duncan) Guy and Alice (Quisenberry) Guy
- Education: University of Michigan
- Occupation: state librarian and director of archives, state bond commissioner, parks director, state treasurer

Emma Guy Cromwell (September 28, 1865 – July 19, 1952) was a suffragist, women's rights activist, and early female Democratic Party politician from Kentucky in the United States. Cromwell became the first woman to hold a statewide office in Kentucky when she was elected state librarian in 1896 by a vote of the Kentucky Senate. Later she won elections for the position of Secretary of State and Kentucky State Treasurer, and was appointed state park director, state bond commissioner, and State Librarian and Director of Archives.

== Early life and education ==
Emma Guy, the daughter of Ashley and Alice (Quisenberry) Guy, was born on September 28, 1865, in Simpson County, Kentucky, and when her father died she spent most of her childhood in neighboring Allen County, Kentucky. She had one sister and two brothers.

Emma attended Howard Female College at Gallatin in Sumner County, Tennessee. She returned to Scottsville, Kentucky to teach at Allen Male and Female College. Later she studied parliamentary law at the University of Michigan.

Emma married Frankfort, Kentucky, attorney William F. Cromwell on May 30, 1897, in a church ceremony in Bowling Green, Kentucky. William Cromwell was Chief Clerk of the prior State Legislative session. They had one son, William Foree Cromwell. Her husband died in 1909.

== Political career ==
In 1896, Guy was appointed by the Kentucky General Assembly for the position of State Librarian making her the first female to hold a position in a Kentucky State Office. Given that the state librarian then could not serve successive terms, she took on new roles in public service: serving as the enrolling clerk (1916 to 1918) and parliamentarian of the Kentucky House of Representatives and getting elected to the Frankfort School Board. She also volunteered in women's clubs such as the Daughters of the American Revolution and the United Daughters of the Confederacy. She also served on the state Parent Teacher Association.

In 1918 Cromwell published Cromwell's Compendium of Parliamentary Law. She published in 1920 a booklet, "Citizenship, A Manual for Voters," that was dedicated to the "new voters in Kentucky"—women.

A strong appeal is made to the women voters of our nation to prepare themselves for public life by keeping in touch with the issues of the day as well as the functions of government. While it is a great privilege to take part in public affairs, and study the questions of the day, so that we can vote intelligently and criticize justly, let us not forget that the home is the most sacred refuge of life, the nucleus around which all pure and true civilization is formed, and that the chief end of all good government is to improve and protect the home, the church and the community.

In 1922 she was parliamentarian for the Kentucky House and Senate. In 1923, Cromwell was elected Kentucky Secretary of State in elections that included two other females. The Republicans had nominated Eleanor Wickliffe of Bardstown, and both Cromwell and Mary Elliott Flanery stood for the Democratic Party against three male candidates. Cromwell won both in the primary and then in the general election. She held the office from January 1, 1924, until January 1, 1928. Cromwell discovered the records of previous administrations in the Capitol basement, and retrieved and categorized them. Cromwell was the first woman to serve as acting governor of Kentucky when the two other officials in the line of succession—Governor William J. Fields and Lt. Gov. Henry Denhardt—were attending the 1924 Democratic National Convention in New York City.

Cromwell went on to be elected Kentucky State Treasurer in 1927.

Governor Ruby Laffoon appointed Cromwell as Kentucky State Park Director in 1932.

In 1937 Governor Happy Chandler named her State Librarian and Director of Archives, a post she then held for several more terms. She arranged for the return of the Kentucky state constitution from the University of Chicago Archives.

In 1939, Cromwell published her autobiography, Woman in Politics which was republished in 1996 by The Kentucky Commission on Women. In this book, she praises the suffragist Laura Clay as "my main tutor and adviser (65)" though there is not much detail in her memoir about any work she did for the Kentucky suffrage movement.

== Later life and death ==
Cromwell continued to be active in Democratic Party politics until she fell and broke a hip in 1949. Cromwell died on July 19, 1952, of medical complications following a stroke. She is buried in the Frankfort Cemetery, in Frankfort Kentucky.

== Legacy ==
Cromwell was one of seventeen women given a place of honor in the Kentucky State Capital when their portraits were placed in a permanent display called "Kentucky Women Remembered".

"Emma's List", a new Political Action Committee created in 1993 to raise funds for female's campaigning for a Kentucky State office, was named in honor of Emma Cromwell.

== Bibliography ==
- Cromwell, Emma Guy (1920). Citizenship: A Manual for Voters. Frankfort, Kentucky: Emma Guy Cromwell.
- Cromwell, Emma Guy (1939). Woman in Politics. Louisville, Kentucky: Standard Printing Co. OCLC 3424932.
- Hanly, Rebecca S. (Summer 2001). "Emma Guy Cromwell and Mary Elliott Flannery: Pioneers for Women in Kentucky Politics". Register of the Kentucky Historical Society. 99: 287‐301.
- Research journal posts about Emma Guy Cromwell in History of Kentucky Women in the Civil Rights Era, University of Kentucky

Political offices
Preceded by Fred A. Vaughn	Secretary of State of Kentucky; 1924–1928	Succeeded by Ella Lewis
Preceded by Edward Blan Dishman	Treasurer of Kentucky; 1928–1932	Succeeded by Elam Huddleston
