= Pikeville Cut-Through =

Rock cut in Pikeville, Kentucky, US

Coordinates: 37.47527°N 82.53891°W

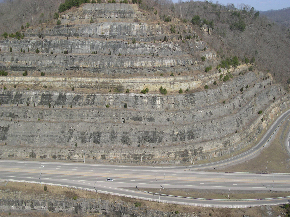
Pikeville Cut-Through

The Pikeville Cut-Through is a rock cut in Pikeville, Kentucky, United States, completed in 1987, through which passes a four-lane divided highway (Corridor B, numbered as U.S. Route 23 (US 23), US 119, US 460, and KY 80), a railroad line (CSX' Big Sandy Subdivision), and the Levisa Fork of the Big Sandy River. It is one of the largest civil engineering projects in the Western Hemisphere. Nearly 18,000,000 cubic yards (14,000,000 m^{3}) of soil and rock were moved while making the Pikeville Cut-Through. It was designed and constructed by the U.S. Army Corps of Engineers.

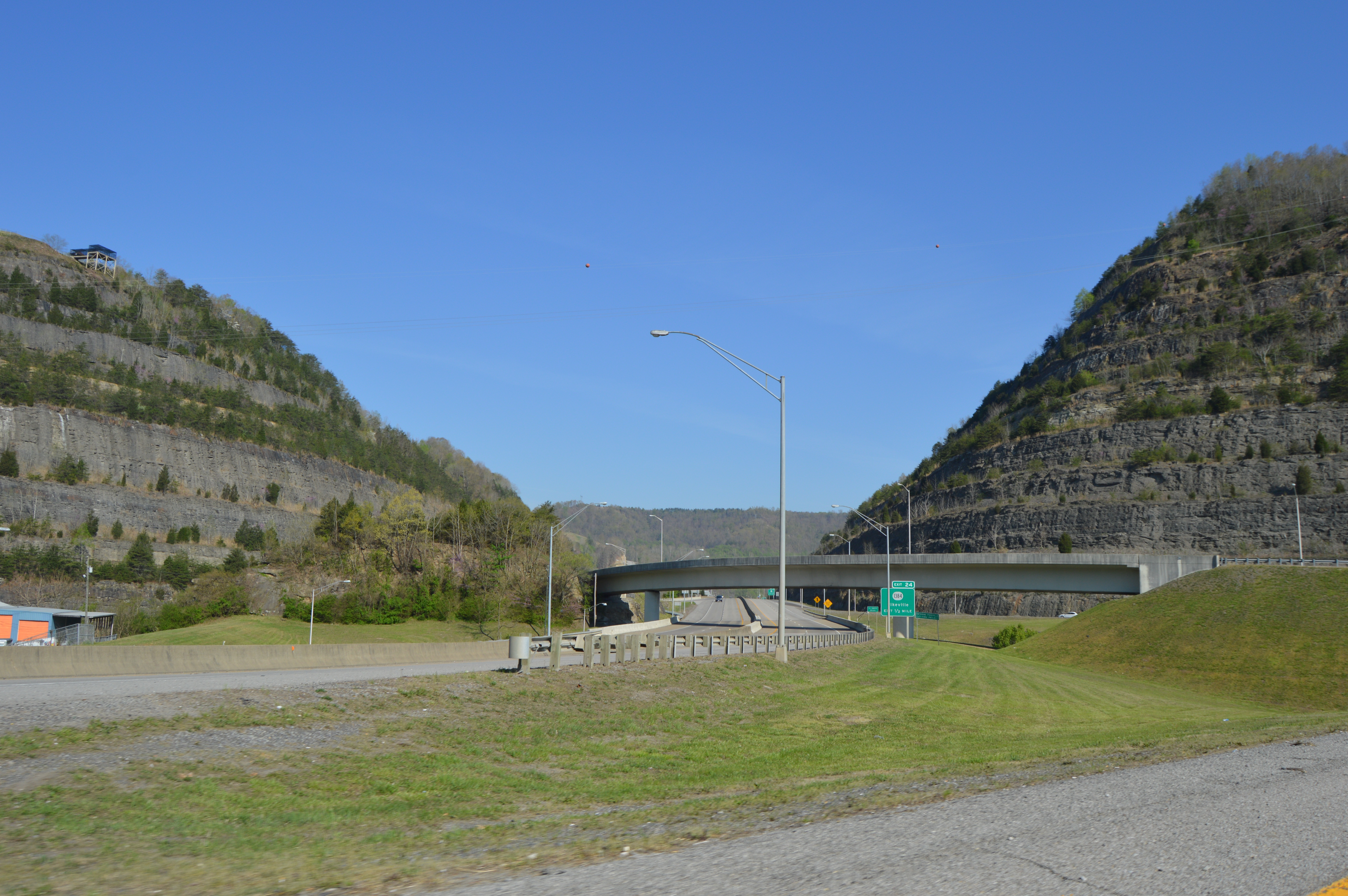
Looking through the Cut-Through from the south

The Pikeville Cut-Through is 1,300 feet (400 m) wide, 3,700 feet (1.1 km) long, and 523 feet (159 m) deep. The project was completed in 1987 following 14 years of work at a cost of $77.6 million ($220 million in 2025 dollars).

== Purpose ==
The project was initially envisioned by Pikeville native and longtime mayor Dr. William Hambley in 1960. Hambley proposed moving the railbed as a solution to the problem of coal dust pollution from the coal-hauling trains that passed through the city daily. In 1963, Pikeville received a $38,000 federal grant for a railroad relocation feasibility study and was named a "Model City" by the recently formed Model Cities Program, generating even more funding. By 1965, the plan had further developed to accommodate Corridor B of the Appalachian Development Highway System, assuring the construction of the Pikeville Cut-Through.

It was also decided to relocate the Levisa Fork of the Big Sandy River, which then snaked through the downtown area, to eliminate almost-yearly flooding. The river bed then was to be reclaimed, significantly increasing the available space for development within the city.

== Construction ==
The Pikeville Cut-Through was constructed in four phases by the U.S. Army Corps of Engineers between November 26, 1973, and October 2, 1987.

Phase I of construction began on November 26, 1973. By the end of Phase I, nearly 13,000,000 cubic yards (9,900,000 m^{3}) of rock were blasted from Peach Orchard Mountain to create a channel for the road, railroad, and river. The cost of Phase I at completion was $17,250,000.

Phase II of construction began on March 4, 1980. During this phase the coal tipples and railroad tracks were removed from downtown Pikeville, a bridge was constructed across the cut, the river was rerouted, and the former riverbed filled. 5,000,000 cubic yards (3,800,000 m^{3}) of soil was moved to create 240 acres (0.97 km^{2}) of available land in downtown at a cost of $22,200,000.

Phase III and IV of the construction began on March 15, 1983. The final stages consisted of: the construction of the downtown interchanges and flood walls, another new bridge, and the construction of Hambley Boulevard atop the former railbed – a lasting tribute to William Hambley. These two phases created an additional 150 acres (0.61 km^{2}) of downtown property at a cost of $19,700,000.

The project was dedicated on October 2, 1987.
