= Demonstration Cities and Metropolitan Development Act =

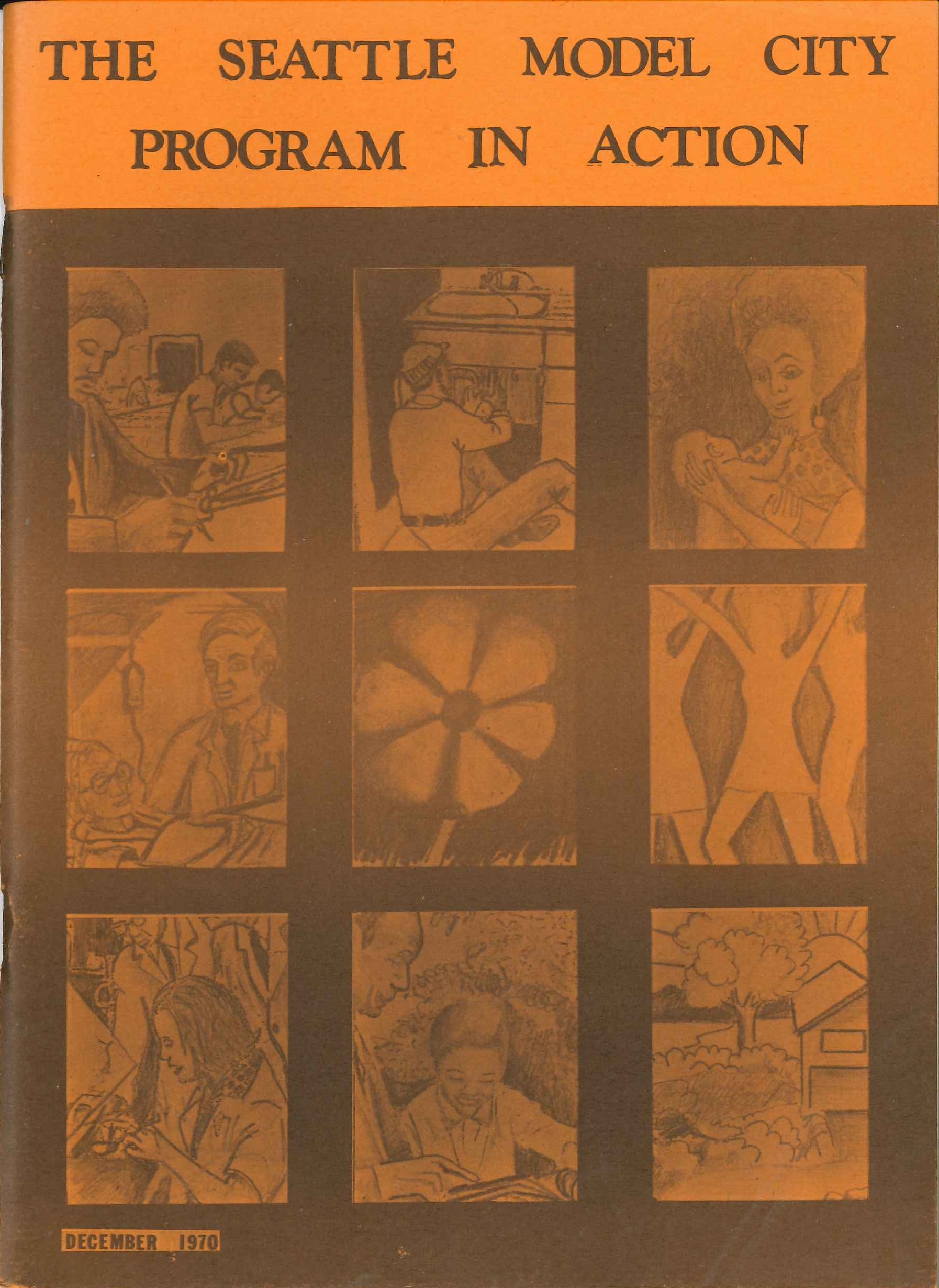
Cover of The Seattle Model City Program in Action, December 1970, a report on Seattle's part of the Model Cities Program.

The Demonstration Cities and Metropolitan Development Act of 1966 (PL89-754, 80 Stat. 1255, November 3, 1966), commonly referred to as the Demonstration Cities Act, or Model Cities Program, was enacted by the 89th United States Congress as one of the last urban aid initiatives of the Great Society agenda. This program sought to cultivate urban renewal, minimize blight, address social unrest and racial imbalances, and improve the welfare of those living in underdeveloped neighborhoods by means of federal and local coordinated efforts. It expanded funding parameters for FHA insurance programs established in the National Housing Act of 1949, provided aid to cities for redevelopment, and included measures targeting the proliferation of group practice facilities, mass transit, conservation, water and air quality, public safety, and support for the arts and humanities.

== Background ==
In the 1960s, cities across the country were facing the threat of furthered urban decay in the convergence of multiple factors. An economic downturn persisted in the wake of the Great Depression and World War II. De-industrialization occurred as industry and employment shifted to the sprawl of newly built suburbs. Those left in the cities received the highest impact of this movement. African-American populations felt the effects of discrimination due to redlining and inequitable access to education, health, and employment. The lack of safe housing in these urban areas furthered racial tensions. Widespread urban riots broke out as social unrest heightened. Pressures for government intervention and remedial measures continued to grow. In remarks at the University of Michigan, President Lyndon B. Johnson called for the rebirth of the American city and outlined three places his Great Society initiative would take physical manifestation -- "in our cities, in our countryside, and classrooms." As part of the initiative, he expressed the need for sweeping domestic policy to remedy "The Crisis of Cities."

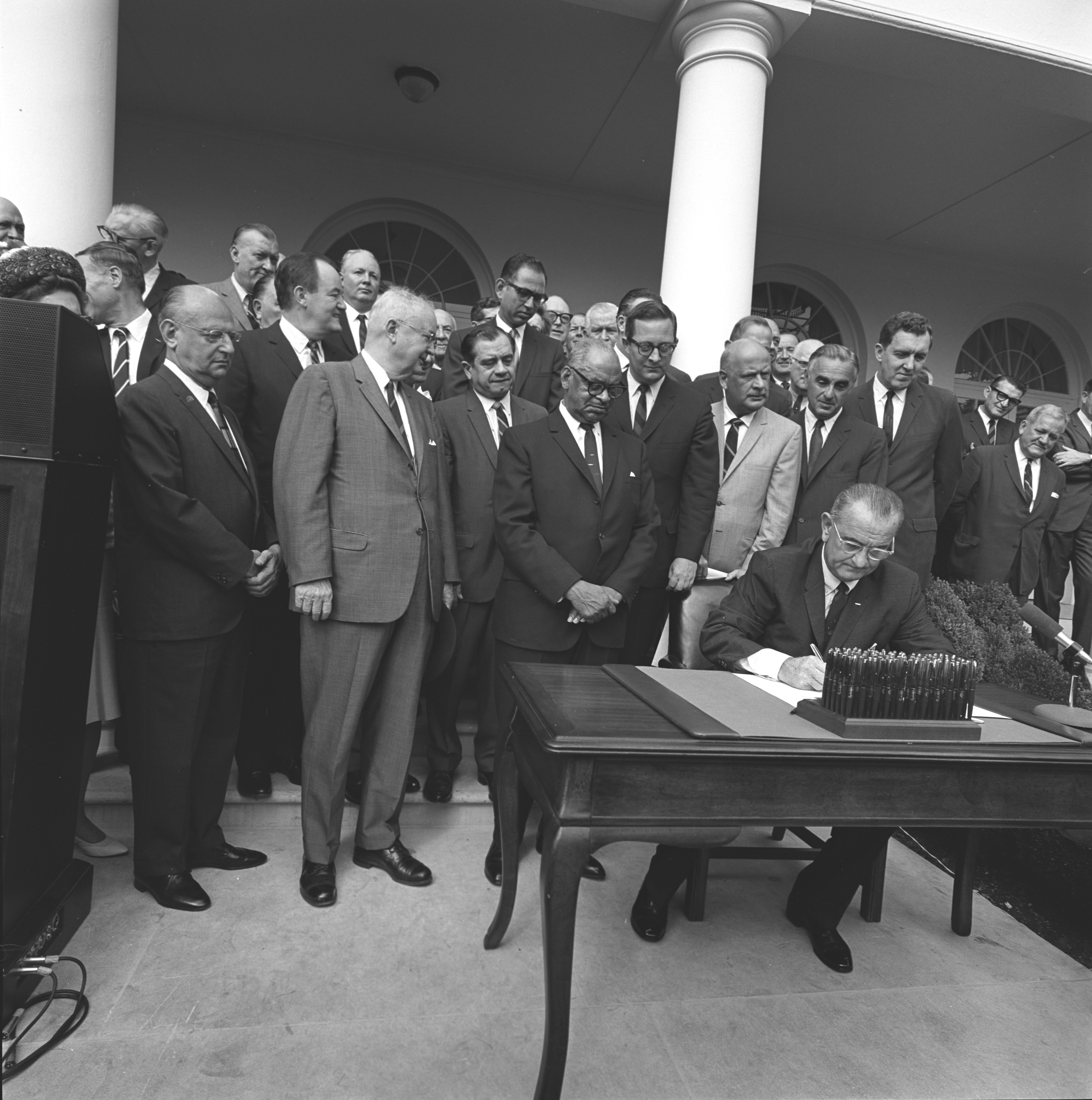
LBJ signs bill establishing the Department of Housing and Urban Development (HUD). Rep. Wright Patman and Sen. Edmund Muskie, key members in the passage of the Demonstration Cities Act, look on. LBJ Library photo by Donald Stoderl http://www.lbjlibrary.net/collections/photo-archive.html

During this time, urban renewal received both support and criticism. Critics of the bill feared the act would be too costly, and some argued against the “desegregation implicit in the ghetto busting bill.”

== Legislative history ==
President Johnson employed the use of task forces in policy formulation. In 1965, the Metropolitan and Urban Affairs Task Force was assembled to conduct research and craft proposals to aid in urban recovery. Mayor Cavanagh of Detroit, a member of the task force, shared a report from the group with Walter Reuther, president of the United Automobile Workers. The two arranged a brochure titled "Detroit, A Demonstration City." This was presented to the President and Robert C. Weaver, who would later be named Johnson's Secretary of Housing and Urban Development.

In January 1966, Johnson sent a message to Congress encouraging the passage of a comprehensive program aimed at resolving urban dilemmas in cities and metro areas. Multiple bills related to the measure were initially presented. Representative Wright Patman (R-TX) introduced H.R. 12341 on January 27 with fifteen co-sponsors from the Senate. Hearings began in February 1966 before the Subcommittee on Housing of the House Committee on Banking and Currency. Rep. Patman was the chairman of this committee. Secretary Weaver, along with mayors from major cities, testified in support of the bill. In June 1966, the committee held four weeks of hearings. Several bills were merged within the Housing and Urban Development Act of 1966, and reported to the full committee on June 28. The bill generated little support and significant opposition from conservative members and southern democrats. Those in opposition feared budgetary concerns, the expansion of powers given to the Secretary of HUD, government overreach on small cities and local municipalities, and perceived attempts at racial balancing. In an attempt to salvage the legislation, Senator Edmund Muskie took ownership of the bill. He strengthened language on metropolitan development, lessened focus on desegregation, and submitted the bill to the Senate Housing Subcommittee of the Committee on Banking and Currency.

August 11, 1966 the bill moved to the floor of the Senate, and by August 19, it was amended and passed. On October 13, it shifted to the House where it was debated for two days and passed. The Senate did not agree to House amendments, and moved to conference. The House and Senate held conferences on October 17 and 18. The conference report was approved by the Senate on October 18, and the House on October 20th. President Lyndon B. Johnson signed the Demonstration Cities and Metropolitan Development Act of 1966 into law on November 3, 1966. Johnson remarked that the legislation 'recognizes that our cities are made of people, not just bricks and mortar."

== Provisions ==
This legislation provided a significant bridge from the Housing Acts of 1949, to the Housing and Urban Development Act of 1968. Through the use of coordinated intergovernmental efforts, it aimed to rebuild blighted areas, spur metropolitan renewal, and provide support to improve the quality of urban life. Title I established authority to the Secretary of Housing and Urban Development in authorizing grant approval for development and implementation of the program. Provided grants were intended to fund up to eighty percent of project costs. Assistance was primarily dedicated to new demonstration programs, but could be supplementary to existing federally aided projects.

Title II encouraged coordinated efforts between federal and local government; with an emphasis on local government planning. It asserted federal interest in improving the coordination of public facility construction projects "to obtain maximum effectiveness of federal spending and to relate such projects to areawide development plans." It further required that all applications for the planning and construction of facilities be submitted to an areawide planning agency for review. This agency was required to be composed of local elected officials and community members. Subsequently, many urban areas created planning agencies and commissions that included elected officials on their policy boards. By the end of 1969, only seven metropolitan areas lacked an areawide review agency.

Titles III, IV, and V offered amendments to prior National Housing acts, and expanded coverage of FHA mortgage insurance programs. The expansion covered areas affected by civil unrest and riots, low-to-moderate income persons, and veterans. It established new sections encompassing water and sewage facilities, new community developments, and group practice organizations.

Titles VI, VII, and VIII incorporated the preservation of historic structures into urban renewal; amended funding of rural housing assistance; expanded funding to institutions of arts, education, and public safety; and required areas of renewal to provide low cost housing units to those most disadvantaged.

Titles IX and X covered measures concerning technical assistance, the requirement of overtime pay for laborers, extended lease terms for low-rent housing, and provided assistance for housing and facilities in Alaska.
