= Pikeville High School =

Coordinates: 37.48798°N 82.54326°W

Location
- 120 Championship Drive; Pikeville, Kentucky 41501; United States

Information
- School type: Public
- Established: 1915
- School district: Pikeville Independent Schools
- Superintendent: David Trimble
- CEEB code: 182185
- Principal: Brandon K. Blackburn
- Staff: 38.30 (FTE)
- Teaching staff: 35.50 FTE
- Grades: 7-12
- Gender: Co-ed
- Enrollment: 514 (2022–2023)
- Student to teacher ratio: 13.42
- Campus type: Pikeville Independent Schools
- Colors: Maroon and white
- Athletics: KHSAA Class A
- Team name: Panthers
- Feeder schools: Pikeville Elementary School
- Website: https://www.pikeville.kyschools.us/o/pis/page/pikeville-high-school

Pikeville High School (PHS) is located in Pikeville, Kentucky, United States. It enrolls approximately 560 students in grades 7–12. It is part of the Pikeville Independent Schools.

== Campus ==
Moving from a location closer to the downtown area of Pikeville, the current high school building was constructed in 1976. It consisted of classrooms, a library, a central two-story common area, and a gymnasium; dedicated after T.W. Oliver. In 1996, an auditorium was added adjacent to the school on its eastern side; seating capacity of 1000, it was built to augment the building and provide space for performances by the arts and music departments, which previously had been relegated to performing in the gymnasium. Further modifications to the school included a second level weight room above the school's south end, adjacent to the gymnasium, and an outdoor gathering area and veterans' memorial. The entire school received an outdoor renovation in the mid-2000s.

== Extracurricular activities ==
The Pikeville teams, known as the Panthers, compete in archery, basketball, baseball, cheerleading, cross county, football, golf, soccer, softball, tennis, track and field, volleyball, and wrestling. The football team won the Class A State Championship in 1987, 1988, 1989, 2015, 2019, 2021, 2022, and 2023. Also among the extracurricular activities is in the music department offers chorus and concert, marching, and jazz bands. Other extra- curricular activities include Forever Green; FCA; FEA; FBLA; Art, Pep and Key Clubs; Academic Team; Theater; National Honor Society; and Student Council.

The cheerleading program is nationally ranked, with seven UCA National Cheerleading Championship titles (most recently in 2018). They won the KAPOS State title in the traditional division five consecutive seasons (2008 to 2012). They also won the KHSAA small varsity division three consecutive seasons (2016 to 2018).

The boys cross country team were the 2019 Class A State Runner Up.

PHS also competes in academic competitions as part of the Kentucky Governor's Cup and KAAC program. Pikeville was the first-ever team winner of the Kentucky Governor's Cup for academic competitions in 1986. The quick recall team also won the KAAC's state tournament in the Governor's Cup competition in 1989, 2003, 2005 and 2013.

The school has several musical and voice ensembles, and the marching band won several high level state competitions in the early 1990s. The drama department frequently stages well-known musical and dramatic productions, ranging from musicals such as Into the Woods and Beauty and the Beast, to comedic presentations such as Seven Brides for Seven Brothers. Most recently they staged The Cat in the Hat.
