= Community Trust Bancorp =

American Regional Bank

Community Trust Bancorp, Inc.
- Trade name: Community Trust Bank
- Company type: Public
- Traded as: Nasdaq: CTBI
- Industry: Financial services
- Founded: 1903; 123 years ago (as Pikeville National Bank)
- Headquarters: Pikeville, Kentucky, United States
- Number of locations: 81
- Area served: Eastern, north-eastern, central, and south-central Kentucky, southern West Virginia, north-eastern Tennessee
- Key people: Mark A. Gooch (CEO)
- Products: Banking services, investments
- Net income: ▼$78.0 million (2023) $81.8 million (2022)
- Total assets: ▲$5.5 billion (2023) $5.4 billion (2022)
- Total equity: ▲US$702 million (2023) US$ 628 (2022)
- Number of employees: 967 (2023)
- Website: www.ctbi.com

Community Trust Bancorp is an American regional bank holding company that was founded in 1903 as Pikeville National Bank. The renamed corporation continues to have its headquarters in Pikeville, Kentucky, at the heart of Appalachia. Community Trust Bancorp operates a commercial bank, Community Trust Bank, and a trust company, Community Trust and Investment Company of Lexington.

The bank operates over 80 retail branches, most of which are located in eastern, north-eastern, central, and south-central Kentucky. As of 2023, the bank had total deposits of US$4 billion and a market share of 3.53%. Community Trust Bancorp is the second-largest bank headquartered in Kentucky, after Stock Yards Bank of Louisville.

== History ==
In the first years of the twentieth century, the economic future of Pike County, Kentucky, looked sufficiently promising to warrant the creation of another bank. This was thanks to the economic success of coal mining, but also the beginning exploration for oil and gas. Thus, Community Trust was founded on November 27, 1903, as Pikeville National Bank. From 1903 through 1912, J. E. Yost served as the institution's first president.

The challenging economic climate of the 1930s brought the first two of many acquisitions. Pikeville National Bank acquired two failing competitors: the National Bank of Hellier and the Day and Night National Bank of Pikeville (the latter's name advertised the fact that the bank promised its customers to be open for business 24 hours a day).

In 1969, Pikeville National Bank began to expand its reach through branch offices, the first of which opened in Phelps. Other innovations of the time included the introduction of VISA cards, the beginning of computer-based transaction processing, and the creation of new departments, such as Audit and Credit.

In 1981, the bank moved its headquarters from the original building on Pikeville's Main Street to a new structure on North Mayo Trail, on the outskirts of town. In the same year, the holding company was brought into existence to facilitate further development. By the end of 1981, the bank had 160 employees and 17 departments.

In 1997, Pikeville National Bank changed its name to Community Trust Bancorp., Inc.

== Services ==
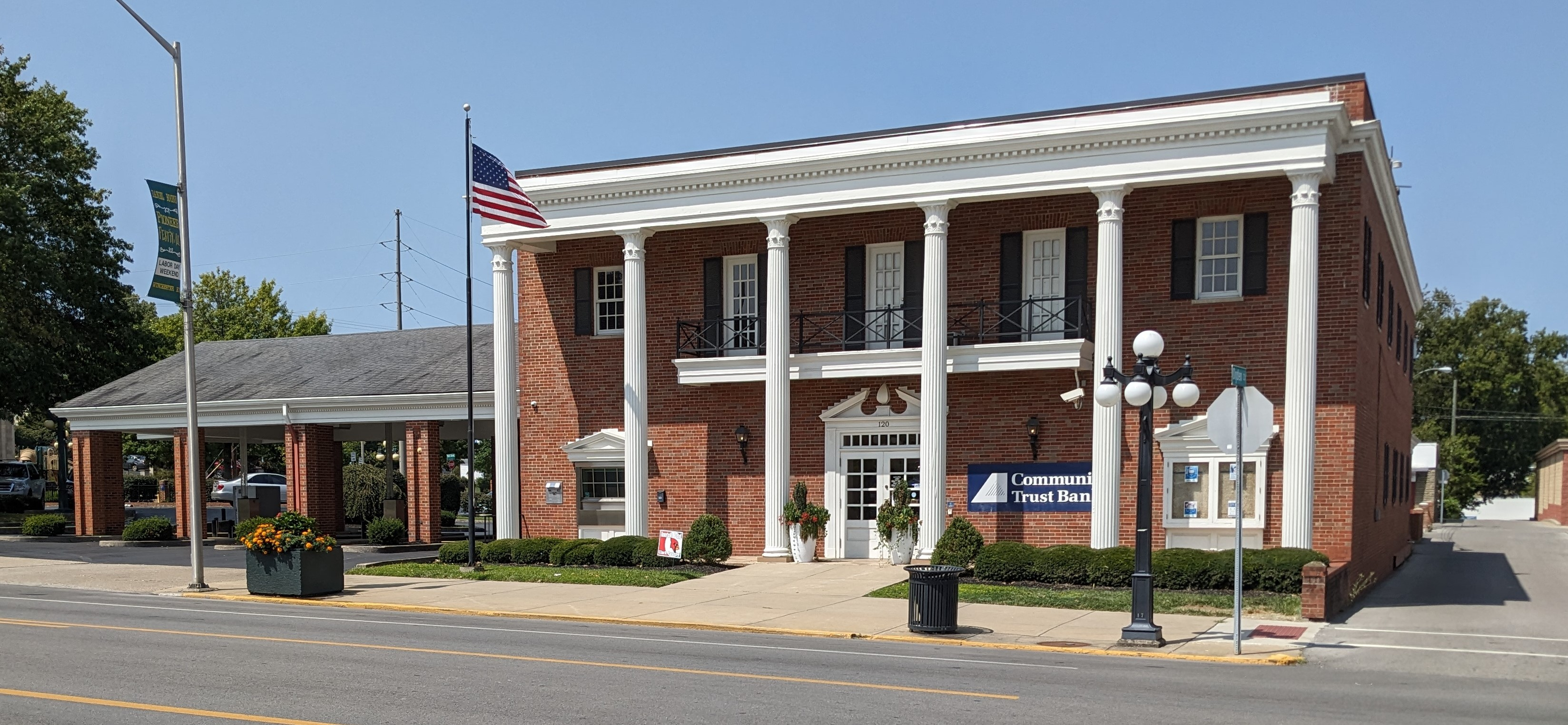
Community Trust Bank on Main Street in Winchester, KY, in the building of the former Bank of Winchester

Community Trust Bank offers all the usual services involved in commercial and personal banking, whereas Community Trust and Investment Company focuses on trust and investment services.
