= Levisa Fork =

Tributary of the Big Sandy River in Kentucky and Virginia

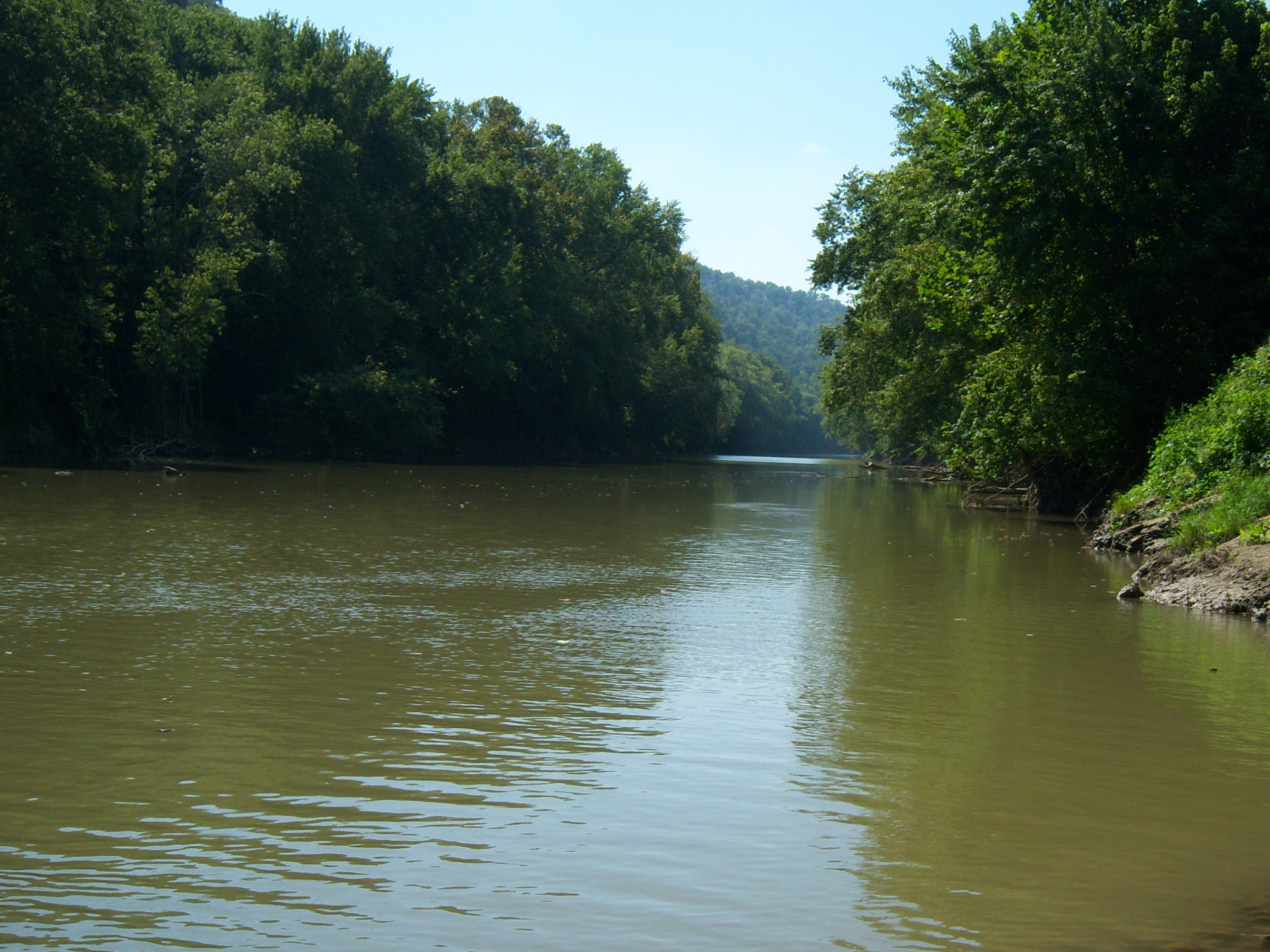
- The Levisa Fork in Paintsville

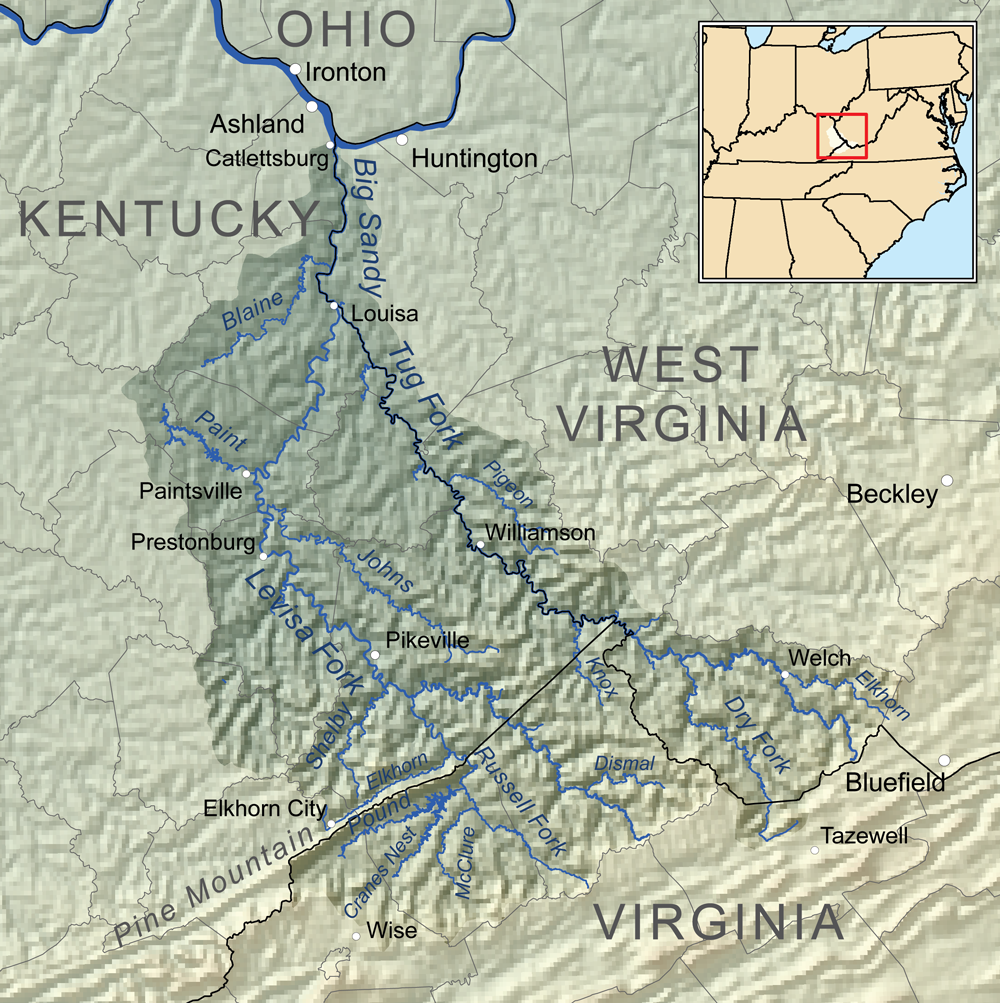
- Map of the Big Sandy River watershed, with its Levisa Fork (left) and Tug Fork (right) tributaries shown

Location
- Country: United States
- State: Kentucky, Virginia
- Counties: Buchanan VA, Pike KY, Floyd KY, Johnson KY, Lawrence KY

Physical characteristics
- Source: Gap of Sandy
  - location: Buchanan County, VA
  - coordinates: 37°09′06″N 81°54′04″W
  - elevation: 2,657 ft (810 m)
- Mouth: Big Sandy River
  - location: Louisa, KY
  - coordinates: 38°07′05″N 82°36′06″W
  - elevation: 545 ft (166 m)
- Length: 164 mi (264 km)
- Discharge
  - location: Pikeville, KY
  - average: 1,504 cu ft/s (42.6 m^{3}/s)
  - minimum: 66 cu ft/s (1.9 m^{3}/s)
  - maximum: 85,500 cu ft/s (2,420 m^{3}/s)

The Levisa Fork (also known as the Levisa Fork River or the Levisa Fork of the Big Sandy River) is a tributary of the Big Sandy River, approximately 164 miles (264 km) long, in southwestern Virginia and eastern Kentucky in the United States.

== Overview ==
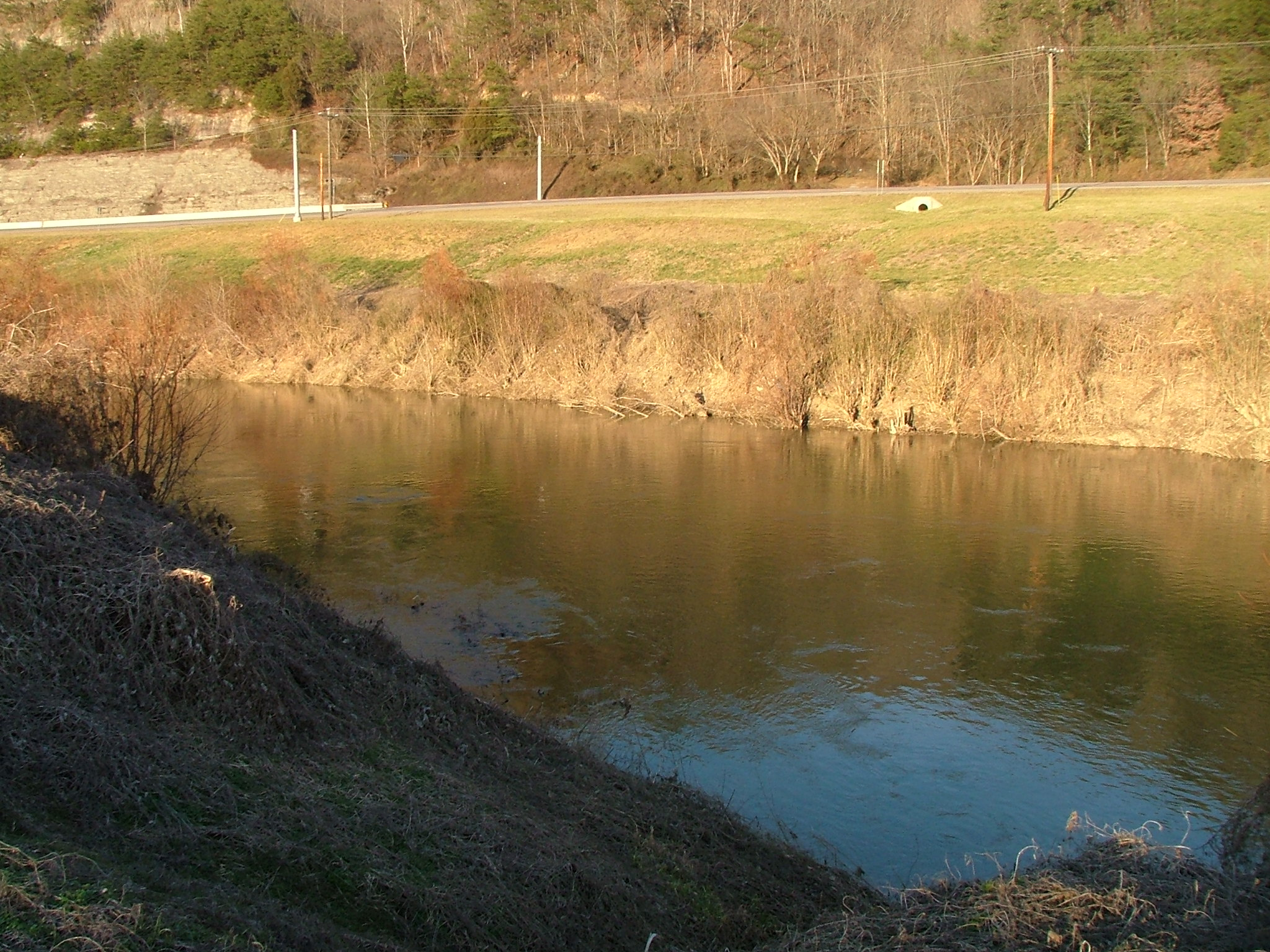
The Levisa Fork in Pikeville

It rises in the Appalachian Mountains of southwestern Virginia, in eastern Buchanan County, near Grundy. It flows west into Pike County, Kentucky, where it is impounded to form Fishtrap Lake reservoir. After collecting the Russell Fork, it flows northwest through Pikeville and Prestonsburg. The natural course of the river formed a loop surrounding downtown Pikeville, but a massive earthmoving project completed in 1987 rerouted the river to bypass the city. At Paintsville it turns to the north-northeast, flowing through Johnson and Lawrence counties. It joins the Tug Fork from the southwest at Louisa on the West Virginia state line to form the Big Sandy.

The Levisa Fork was historically an important river for log driving. The river is partly navigable for commercial purposes through a series of locks. In the early 1900s the river was navigable as far as Pikeville.

Variant names, according to the USGS, include Louisa River, Louisa Fork, Lavisa Fork, and West Fork, in addition to Levisa Fork River and Levisa Fork of the Big Sandy River. The official name according to the USGS is Levisa Fork. According to Robert F. Collins of the United States Forest Service, 18th-century explorer Dr. Thomas Walker had named the nearby Kentucky River the Louisa River, after Princess Louisa, sister of Prince William Augustus, Duke of Cumberland (Walker had just named the Cumberland River a month or two earlier). According to George R. Stewart, frontiersmen "forgot" who it was named for and it changed over time to Levisa. An alternate story is that one of Ephraim Vause' daughters, Levicee, was carried away by the Shawnee after the attack on Fort Vause in 1756. She had placed her name on the trunks of beech and sycamore trees as she had been carried along, thus giving her name to Levisa Fork.

On February 28, 1958, a Floyd County school bus tumbled into the Levisa Fork after a collision with a wrecker truck, leading to one of the worst bus disasters in American history.

== See also ==
- List of rivers of Kentucky
- List of rivers of Virginia
