= Hillbilly Days =

Annual festival in Kentucky, USA

Coordinates: 37°28′43″N 82°31′05″W

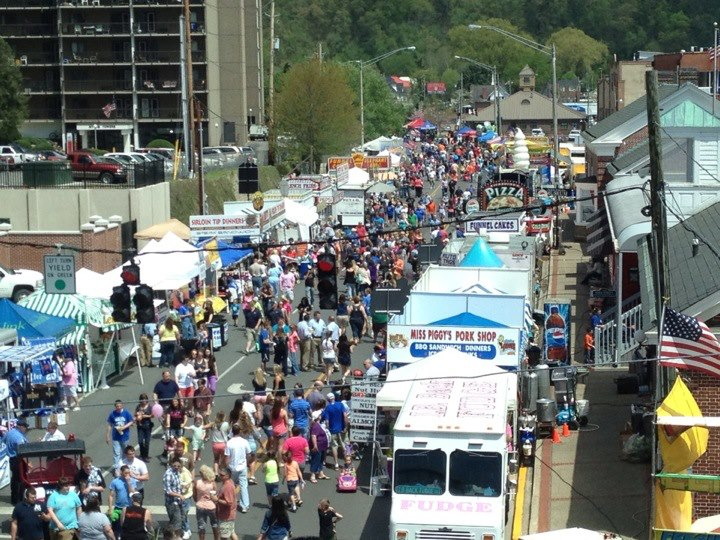
- Crowd on Hambley Blvd.
- Observed by: Pikeville, Kentucky, U.S.
- Type: Event
- Celebrations: Around 100,000
- Date: third Saturday in April
- Frequency: annual

Hillbilly Days is an annual festival that takes place in Pikeville, Kentucky. The festival is hosted by Pikeville it can be as early as the 11th of April and as late as the 21st of April. Each year it brings in over 100,000 people, from all across the continent of North America, who line the streets of the City of Pikeville. Each year this festival raises money for the local Shriners Children's Hospital. According to WYMT Mountain News in Hazard, Kentucky, this event, "gives hillbillies of all ages a chance to have a little fun.....And it lets them embrace the hillbilly lifestyle." This event continuously grows and according to the Southeast Kentucky Chamber of Commerce, "Hillbilly Days 2013 will be bigger and better than ever.".

== History ==
Hillbilly Days was first founded in 1977 by a group of Shriners as a means to raise money for the Shriners Hospital. Two shriners from the Hillbilly Clan Outhouse No. 2, Howard "Dirty Ear" Stratton and "Shady" Grady Kinney, decided to start the festival in 1976 after visiting a festival in Portsmouth, Ohio. They got a group of shriners together and they began the festival in 1977. It has continued ever since. In 2011 this festival was able to raise $72,000 for the Shriners Hospital. Over 100,000 people come once a year experience the event and culture of Appalachia. Participants wear overalls and other rural attire while roaming the streets of Pikeville to help raise money for a cause. The planning committee for this festival usually starts meeting around September and then work on their plans each workday up until the festival begins in mid-April. April 2020 was the first cancellation of its 44-year career; the hiatus was extended the next year. But one man of the area by the name of Daniel Kelly made a push for the legendary festival to get back going in 2022. Without his grit and determination a lot of the locals say the festival would have ended for good.

== See also ==
- Odunde Festival, a similar festival in Philadelphia, Pennsylvania.
