= Kentucky College of Osteopathic Medicine =

Medical school of the University of Pikeville

- Type: Private medical school
- Established: 1997
- Parent institution: University of Pikeville
- Budget: $7.32 million
- Dean: Joe E. Kingery
- Faculty: 20
- Students: 581 (2024-2025)
- Location: Pikeville, Kentucky, United States; 37°28′45″N 82°31′16″W
- Campus: Rural
- Tuition (2009-2010): $33,450 (resident) $33,450 (non-resident)
- Website: upike.edu/COM

Kentucky College of Osteopathic Medicine (UP-KYCOM) is the medical school of University of Pikeville, a private university affiliated with the Presbyterian Church (USA). It is located in Pikeville, Kentucky. UP-KYCOM was established in 1997, grants the Doctor of Osteopathic Medicine degree. It is accredited by the Commission on Osteopathic College Accreditation (COCA) and the Commission on Colleges of the Southern Association of Colleges and Schools.

KYCOM places special emphasis on community and behavioral medicine, ambulatory care, osteopathic manipulative therapy, and rural medicine. The school is one of 37 osteopathic medical schools in the United States. It trains the second most primary care physicians of any medical school in the United States.

== History ==
In September 1993, G. Chad Perry III, an attorney in Paintsville, and his wife, Judy Perry, conceived the idea of establishing a medical school in Eastern Kentucky. Their idea gained supporters who also believed a medical school in Paintsville would eliminate the shortage of primary care physicians in the region. In February 1994, the American College of Osteopathic Medicine (ACOM) was established in Paintsville. It was then renamed the Southern College of Osteopathic Medicine (SCOM) in September 1994.

By August 1995, it became apparent that there was insufficient financial support to construct a school of osteopathic medicine in Paintsville. The executive staff of SCOM decided to merge with Pikeville College to save the available finances. In May 1996, SCOM became known as Pikeville College School of Osteopathic Medicine (PCSOM). PCSOM received accreditation from the American Osteopathic Association Bureau of Professional Education on July 11, 1997. The founding convocation of Pikeville College School of Osteopathic Medicine was held on September 11, 1997, shortly after the matriculation of the first class of 60 students.

In 2010, construction began on KYCOM new facility, the Coal Building. Construction was completed in 2012, and was officially dedicated on September 15, 2012.

In 2011, when Pikeville College became University of Pikeville, PCSOM became the University of Pikeville Kentucky College of Osteopathic Medicine (KYCOM).

In 2013, KYCOM ranked 5th in rural medicine rankings, tying with the University of North Carolina at Chapel Hill and the University of Minnesota and was the highest ranked college of osteopathic medicine in the nation.

== Academics ==
The first two years at KYCOM include system based courses and discipline science based courses. Classes include anatomy, biochemistry, immunology, and principles of osteopathic medicine. Starting in the first year, students begin practicing doctoral skills on human models. During year two, students engage in practice under community physicians. Student doctoring skills and competencies are more thoroughly developed in clinical rotations during years three and four. The third and fourth years of the medical school student are mainly spent away from the medical school as students observe and practice under trained and registered physicians and surgeons to develop an understanding of where they might specialize and apply for residency training programs upon completion of their education at KYCOM. Some of the clinical rotations include Family Medicine, General Internal Medicine, Pediatrics, General Surgery, Emergency Medicine and Clinical Osteopathic Medicine. The rotation sites for students range from counties in Kentucky to other states such as Arkansas, Alabama, Michigan, Mississippi, Ohio, Pennsylvania, and Virginia.

=== Premedical programs ===
The Osteopathic Medical Scholars Program (OMSP) offers accepted incoming undergraduate freshmen at the University of Pikeville both a bachelor's degree, followed by matriculation into the Doctor of Osteopathic Medicine program at KYCOM upon completion of undergraduate course work. KYCOM also offers a program known as the Professional Education Preparation Program (PEPP), which consists of a two-week on campus program that educates high school students about the medical profession. Students are introduced to KYCOM faculty and KYCOM students while engaging in lecture subjects at a pace for the program attendees to get a feel for the future of medical school.

== Student statistics and notable faculty ==
For KYCOM's class of 2015, the average MCAT score was 24, the average cumulative GPA was 3.5, and the average science GPA was 3.4. This has increased since 2011 when the average MCAT score was 21.97 and the average cumulative GPA was a 3.3. KYCOM as an institution has had over 700 students graduate with their degrees as Doctors of Osteopathic Medicine since its establishment in 2001. Sixty percent of these physicians have been serving in the Appalachian region. KYCOM is ranked fourth in affordability compared to all other of U.S. private medical schools. Sixty nine percent of the school's graduates have gone on to be primary care physicians, the second highest of any institution in the country. Two thirds of seniors graduating from KYCOM have been admitted to their first choice residency program, while eighty five to ninety percent of graduating seniors have gone on to one of their top three residency programs. Governor Paul E. Patton, the president of the University of Pikeville, is the president of the Kentucky College of Osteopathic Medicine as well. He is the former 59th governor of the state of Kentucky. Dr. Boyd R. Buser D.O. is the Dean and vice president of health affairs of the Kentucky College of Osteopathic Medicine. Buser is a former president of the American Academy of Osteopathy, chair of the National Board of Osteopathic Medical Examiners, and member of the Kentucky Institute of Medicine, the Kentucky Board of Medical Licensure, the American Osteopathic Association Board of Trustees and the Board of Directors of the Osteopathic International Alliance.

== The Coal Building ==
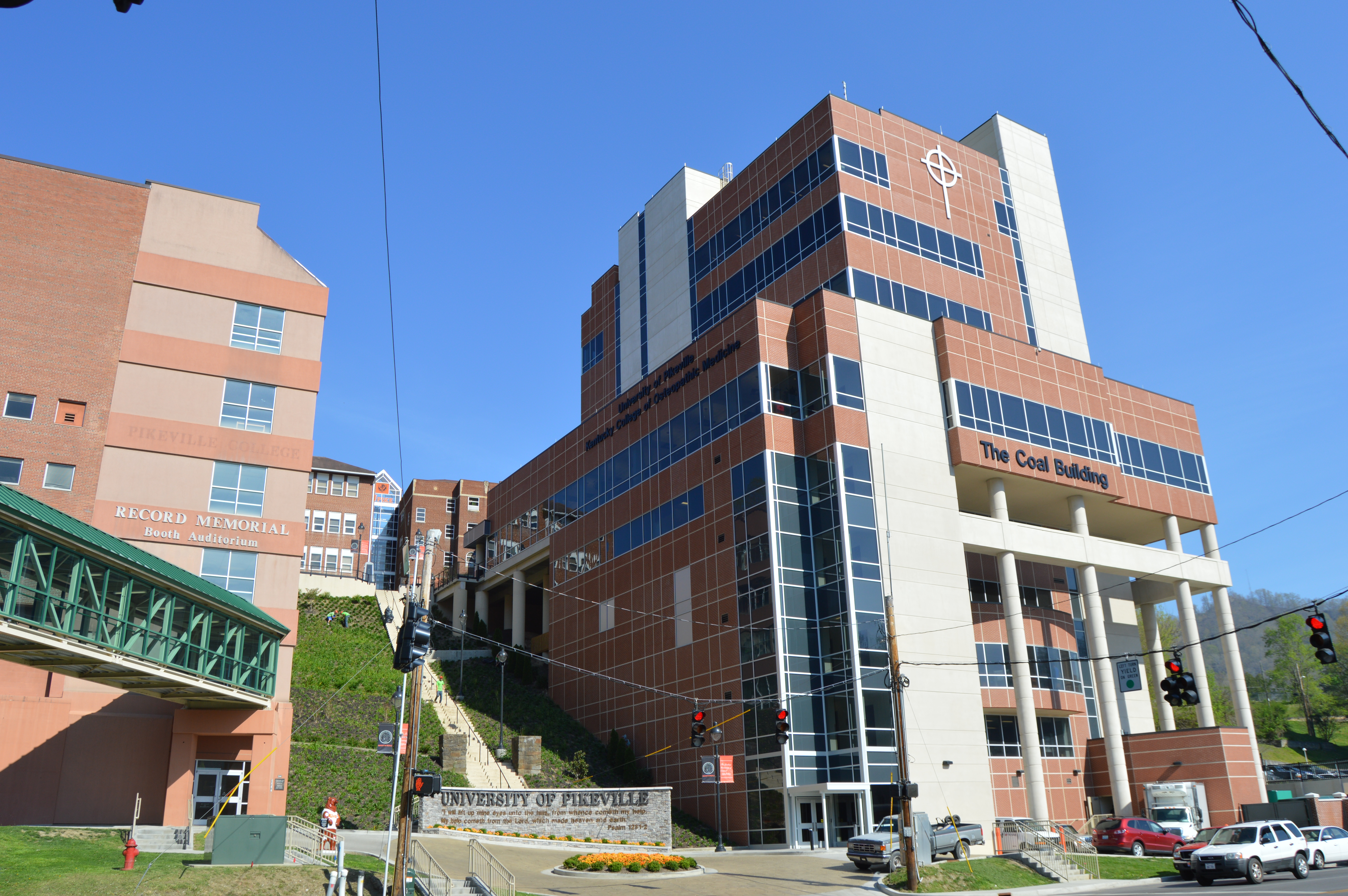
The Coal Building

The Coal Building is a nine-story, 84,000 square foot building, which consists of a clinical skills training and evaluation center, high fidelity robot simulators, research and teaching labs, a gross anatomy laboratory, an Osteopathic Manipulative Medicine lab, lecture halls and classrooms, and a campus cafeteria. Construction for the Coal Building began in October 2010 and finished in September 2012, at a cost of $40 million. Funding for its construction was provided by a $26.5 million direct loan obtained via the American Recovery and Reinvestment Act of 2009, $10 million from the New Market Tax Credit (part of the National Community Investment Fund), and from two $500,000 grants, one from the Appalachian Regional Commission and one from the James Graham Brown Foundation. The Coal Building was named in recognition of the coal industry's impact on the Appalachian region.
