= Pikeville, Kentucky =

- City
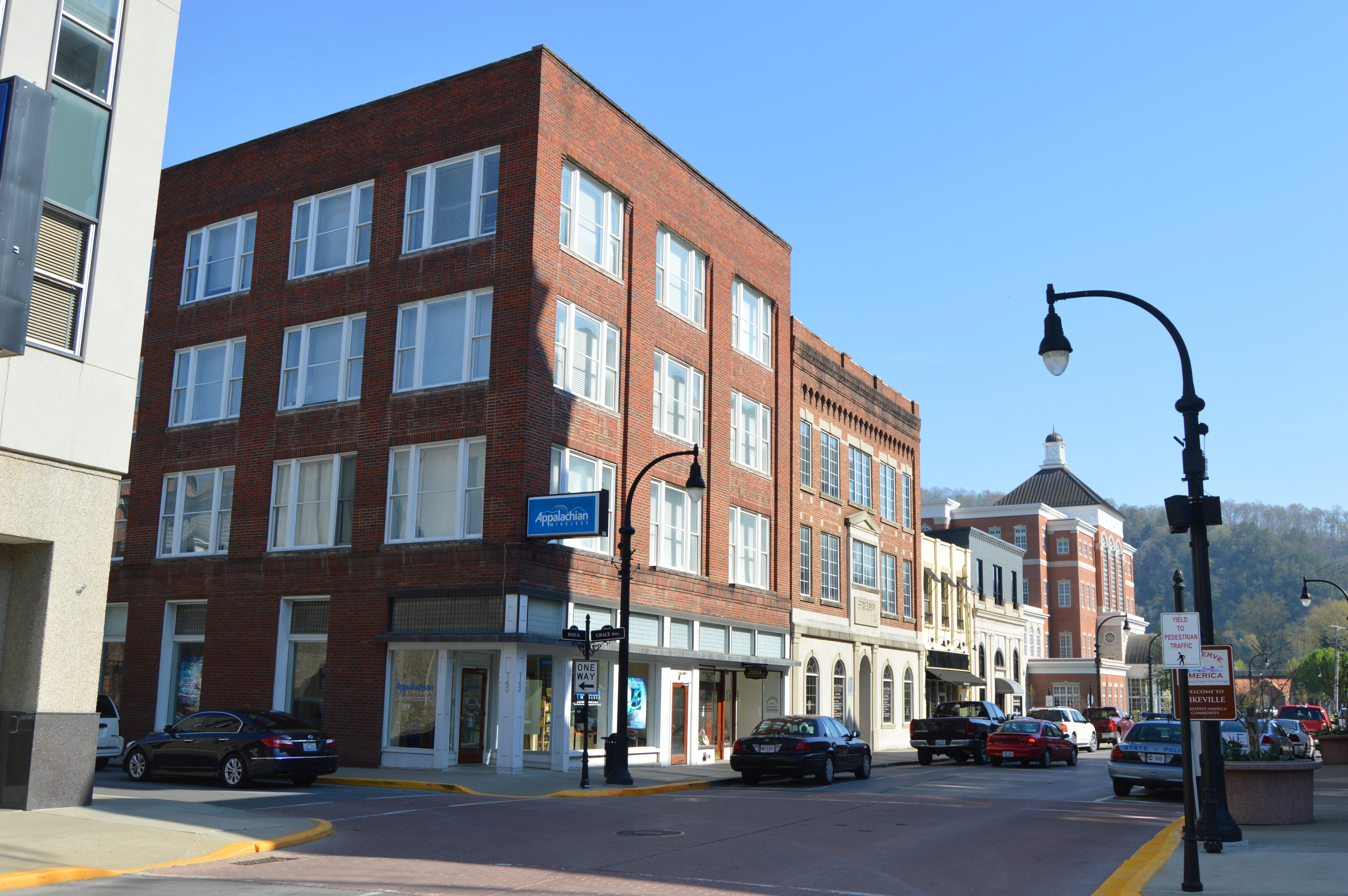
- Main Street in Pikeville

- Seal
- Nickname: The City That Moves Mountains
- Motto: "For Progress"
- Location in Pike County, Kentucky

- Location within Kentucky Location within the United States
- Coordinates: 37°28′37″N 82°31′27″W
- Country: United States
- State: Kentucky
- County: Pike
- Established: 1824
- Incorporated: 1848
- Named for: Zebulon Pike

Government
  - Type: Council–manager
  - Mayor: James A. Carter (D)
  - City Manager: Reggie Hickman

Area
  - Total: 20.99 sq mi (54.36 km^{2})
  - Land: 20.99 sq mi (54.36 km^{2})
  - Water: 0 sq mi (0.00 km^{2})
- Elevation: 791 ft (241 m)

Population (2020)
  - Total: 7,754
  - Estimate (2022): 7,358
  - Density: 369.4/sq mi (142.63/km^{2})
- Time zone: UTC−5 (EST)
  - Summer (DST): UTC−4 (EDT)
- ZIP Codes: 41501–41502
- Area code: 606
- FIPS code: 21-60852
- GNIS feature ID: 2404518
- Website: www.pikevilleky.gov

Pikeville (/ˈpaɪkvəl/) is a home rule-class city in and the county seat of Pike County, Kentucky, United States. Its population was 7,754 as of the 2020 census. Pikeville serves as a regional economic, educational, and entertainment hub for the surrounding areas of eastern Kentucky, Virginia, and West Virginia. It is home to the University of Pikeville and the Pikeville Cut-Through, the second-largest earthmoving project in the Western Hemisphere.

== History ==
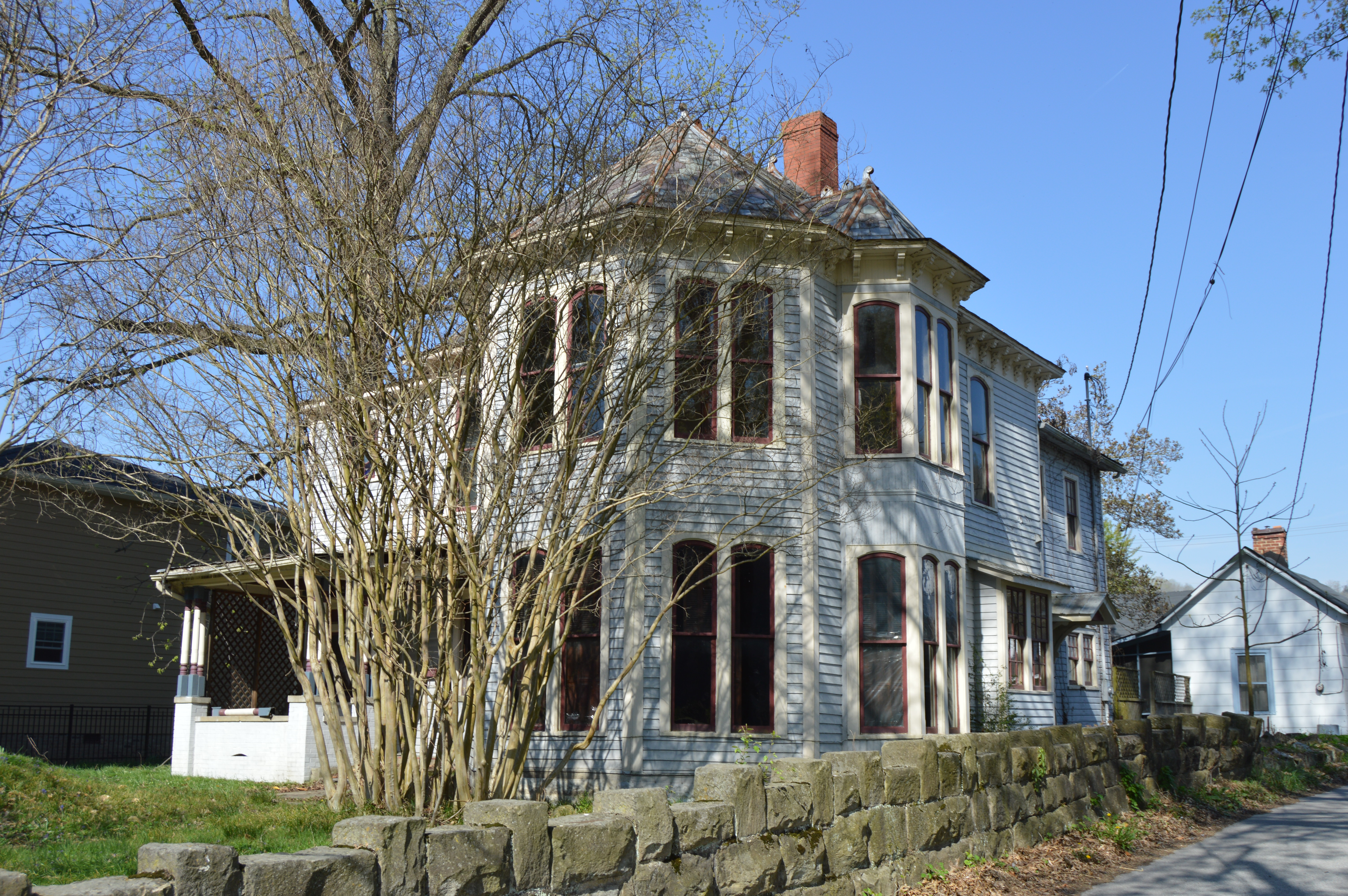
The historic York House, built 1864

On March 25, 1822, state officials decided to build a new county seat named "Liberty", 1.5 miles (2.4 km) below the mouth of the Russell Fork. Public disapproval of the site led a new decision on December 24, 1823, to establish the county seat on land donated by local farmer Elijah Adkins. This settlement was established as the town of Pike in 1824, taking its name from Pike County, which was named after brigadier general and explorer Zebulon Pike. The name was changed in 1829 to Piketon and incorporated under that name in 1848; it was renamed Pikeville in 1850.

Pikeville was host to part of the Hatfield–McCoy feud. Randolph McCoy and his wife and daughter are buried on a hillside overlooking the town.

The National Civic League designated Pikeville as an All-American City in 1965.

From 1973 to 1987, the Pikeville Cut-Through was constructed immediately west of downtown. The massive rock cut is one of the largest civil engineering projects in the Western Hemisphere, moving nearly 18,000,000 cubic yards (14,000,000 m^{3}) of soil and rock. The project alleviated traffic congestion in downtown and eliminated flooding by rerouting the Levisa Fork River.

From 1982 to 1984, Pikeville was home to the Pikeville Cubs and Pikeville Brewers. Pikeville played as a member of the Rookie level Appalachian League. Pikeville was an affiliate of the Milwaukee Brewers (1982) and Chicago Cubs (1983–84). Baseball Hall of Fame member Greg Maddux played for the 1984 Pikeville Cubs in his first professional season.

The city has been a center of rapid development in Eastern Kentucky since the 1990s. Pikeville College (now the University of Pikeville) opened the Kentucky College of Osteopathic Medicine in 1997. The university also opened the Kentucky College of Optometry, Central Appalachia's first optometry school, in 2016. In 2005, the 7,000 seat, multi-purpose Appalachian Wireless Arena opened in downtown. Pikeville Medical Center has established itself as a regional healthcare center. In 2014, a new 11-story clinic and a 10-story parking structure was completed at a cost of $150 million. The hospital has also become a member of the Mayo Clinic Care Network. In 2013, construction began on a shopping center known as Pikeville Commons. The first stores opened in the shopping center in 2014.

Late 2017 saw several announcements regarding tenants for the recently opened Kentucky Enterprise Industrial Park. Construction has begun on a 60,000 square foot manufacturing facility to be owned and operated by SilverLiner, whose primary business is expected to be the manufacture and assembly of tanks for tanker trucks.

In 2018, the Kentucky League of Cities named Pikeville's city government the KLC City Government of the Year. This was the award's inaugural year; it was intended to recognize "a city that has done something transformational, and our first ever recipient certainly demonstrates a city making a huge impact on its region."

== Geography ==
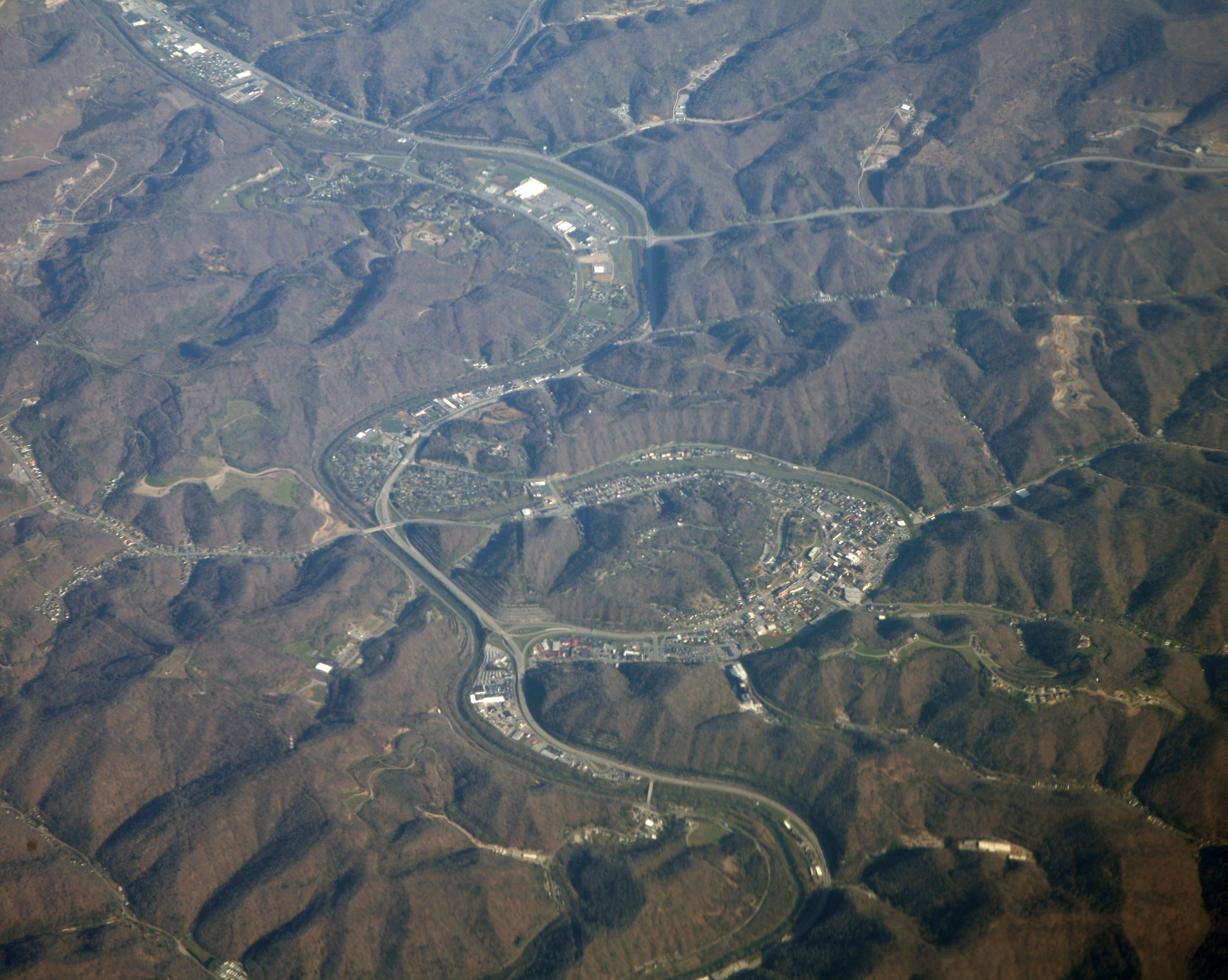
Aerial photo of Pikeville

According to the U.S. Census Bureau, the city has an area of 15.4 square miles (40 km^{2}), all land. As of 2009, Pikeville set its new city limits to be 0.3 miles from its county line. This significantly affected the city of Coal Run Village, which was previously on the city limit of Pikeville.

The city is in the Appalachian Mountains, along the Levisa Fork of the Big Sandy River. The downtown area is built in a narrow valley in a bend of the Levisa Fork that was bypassed in 1987 with the completion of the Pikeville Cut-Through, while places such as Weddington Square Plaza are built in a broader part of the river valley.

=== Climate ===
Pikeville has a humid subtropical climate, abbreviated "Cfa" on climate maps.

Climate data for Pikeville, Kentucky
Month	Jan	Feb	Mar	Apr	May	Jun	Jul	Aug	Sep	Oct	Nov	Dec	Year
Record high °F (°C)	82 (28)	93 (34)	90 (32)	96 (36)	99 (37)	104 (40)	105 (41)	107 (42)	104 (40)	98 (37)	88 (31)	82 (28)	107 (42)
Mean daily maximum °F (°C)	44 (7)	50 (10)	60 (16)	71 (22)	79 (26)	86 (30)	89 (32)	89 (32)	82 (28)	71 (22)	59 (15)	49 (9)	69 (21)
Mean daily minimum °F (°C)	24 (−4)	25 (−4)	33 (1)	40 (4)	50 (10)	60 (16)	65 (18)	63 (17)	57 (14)	43 (6)	34 (1)	28 (−2)	44 (6)
Record low °F (°C)	−18 (−28)	−7 (−22)	−4 (−20)	21 (−6)	30 (−1)	37 (3)	45 (7)	42 (6)	33 (1)	17 (−8)	6 (−14)	−10 (−23)	−18 (−28)
Average precipitation inches (mm)	3.72 (94)	3.25 (83)	3.85 (98)	3.66 (93)	3.96 (101)	4.09 (104)	4.20 (107)	4.20 (107)	3.27 (83)	2.89 (73)	3.10 (79)	3.58 (91)	43.77 (1,112)
Source: The Weather Channel.

== Demographics ==
Historical population
Census	Pop.	Note	%±
1870	140		—
1880	246		75.7%
1890	456		85.4%
1900	508		11.4%
1910	1,280		152.0%
1920	2,110		64.8%
1930	3,376		60.0%
1940	4,185		24.0%
1950	5,154		23.2%
1960	4,754		−7.8%
1970	5,205		9.5%
1980	4,756		−8.6%
1990	6,324		33.0%
2000	6,295		−0.5%
2010	6,903		9.7%
2020	7,754		12.3%
2024 (est.)	7,366		−5.0%
U.S. Decennial Census

=== 2020 census ===
As of the 2020 census, Pikeville had a population of 7,754. The median age was 36.2 years. 18.0% of residents were under the age of 18 and 14.6% of residents were 65 years of age or older. For every 100 females there were 95.3 males, and for every 100 females age 18 and over there were 94.1 males age 18 and over.

76.1% of residents lived in urban areas, while 23.9% lived in rural areas.

There were 2,991 households in Pikeville, of which 26.8% had children under the age of 18 living in them. Of all households, 35.0% were married-couple households, 20.6% were households with a male householder and no spouse or partner present, and 39.0% were households with a female householder and no spouse or partner present. About 39.6% of all households were made up of individuals and 13.1% had someone living alone who was 65 years of age or older.

There were 3,452 housing units, of which 13.4% were vacant. The homeowner vacancy rate was 3.4% and the rental vacancy rate was 9.4%.

Racial composition as of the 2020 census
Race	Number	Percent
White	6,843	88.3%
Black or African American	303	3.9%
American Indian and Alaska Native	22	0.3%
Asian	199	2.6%
Native Hawaiian and Other Pacific Islander	7	0.1%
Some other race	89	1.1%
Two or more races	291	3.8%
Hispanic or Latino (of any race)	234	3.0%

=== 2000 census ===
As of the census of 2000, there were 6,295 people, 2,705 households, and 1,563 families living in the city. The population density was 408.0 inhabitants per square mile (157.5/km^{2}). There were 2,981 housing units at an average density of 193.2 per square mile (74.6/km^{2}). The racial makeup of the city was 94.58% White, 2.64% African American, 0.17% Native American, 1.25% Asian, 0.05% Pacific Islander, 0.25% from other races, and 1.05% from two or more races. Hispanic or Latino of any race were 1.40% of the population.

There were 2,763 households, out of which 29.7% had children under the age of 18 living with them, 41.0% were married couples living together, 14.5% had a female householder with no husband present, and 42.2% were non-families. 39.0% of all households were made up of individuals, and 16.3% had someone living alone who was 65 years of age or older. The average household size was 2.14 and the average family size was 2.88.

In the city, the population was spread out, with 22.2% under the age of 18, 12.9% from 18 to 24, 27.9% from 25 to 44, 21.5% from 45 to 64, and 15.4% who were 65 years of age or older. The median age was 36 years. For every 100 females, there were 85.5 males. For every 100 females age 18 and over, there were 78.1 males.

The median income for a household in the city was $22,026, and the median income for a family was $36,792. Males had a median income of $42,298 versus $19,306 for females. The per capita income for the city was $21,426. About 21.2% of families and 25.4% of the population were below the poverty line, including 36.7% of those under age 18 and 15.8% of those age 65 or over.

== Arts and culture ==
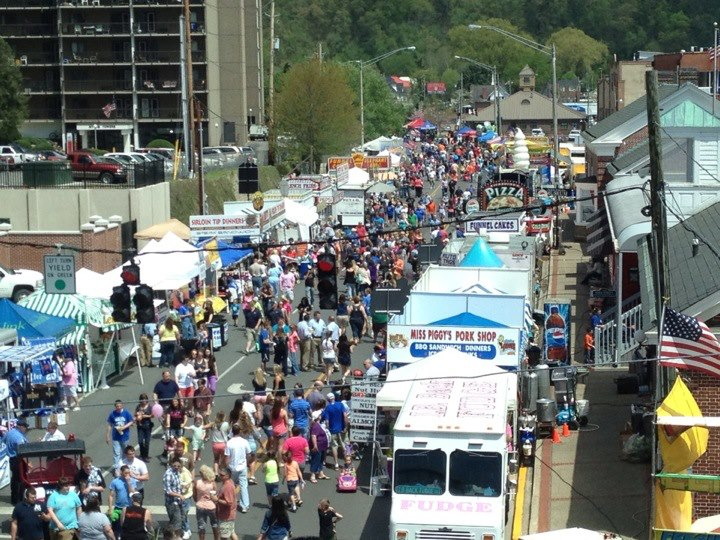
Crowded Hambley Boulevard during Hillbilly Days 2013

Hillbilly Days is an annual festival held in mid-April in Pikeville, celebrating Appalachian culture. Local Shriners started the event as a fundraiser for the Shriners Children's Hospital. It has grown since its beginning in 1976 and is now the second-largest festival held in Kentucky. Artists and craftspeople showcase their talents and sell their works. Nationally renowned musicians as well as regional mountain musicians share six different stages throughout downtown Pikeville. Wannabe hillbillies from across the nation compete to come up with the wildest hillbilly outfit. Fans of "mountain music" attend from around the nation. The festival embraces the area's culture and past through company, music, and costume. The proceeds go to Shriners Hospitals for Children. The festival honors and recognizes the heritage of Appalachia, while poking fun at the stereotype associated with the region.

The Big Sandy Heritage Center, established in 2003, is the largest depository for artifacts relating to the history and culture of the Big Sandy Valley.

In 2005, the Appalachian Wireless Arena, formerly known as the Eastern Kentucky Expo Center, opened in downtown Pikeville. The center, which seats 7,000, features numerous events including concerts and shows. The city is also home to the Pikeville Concert Association, which secures cultural events for the area. These events usually take place at the University of Pikeville's Booth Auditorium.

The Appalachian Center for the Arts is a 200-seat indoor professional theater in downtown Pikeville.

The Hatfield and McCoy River Trails, on the Levisa Fork River, opened in 2014.

Alltech of Lexington constructed a distillery, brewery, and visitors' center known as Dueling Barrels Brewery & Distillery that opened in downtown in 2018. The name was inspired by the Hatfield-McCoy Feud, and the tour includes storytellers describing those events in addition to an explanation of the brewing and distilling processes.

=== Library ===
A pack horse library was established for library services in the late 1930s and early 1940s.

Pikeville has a lending library, a branch of the Pike County Public Library.

== Education ==
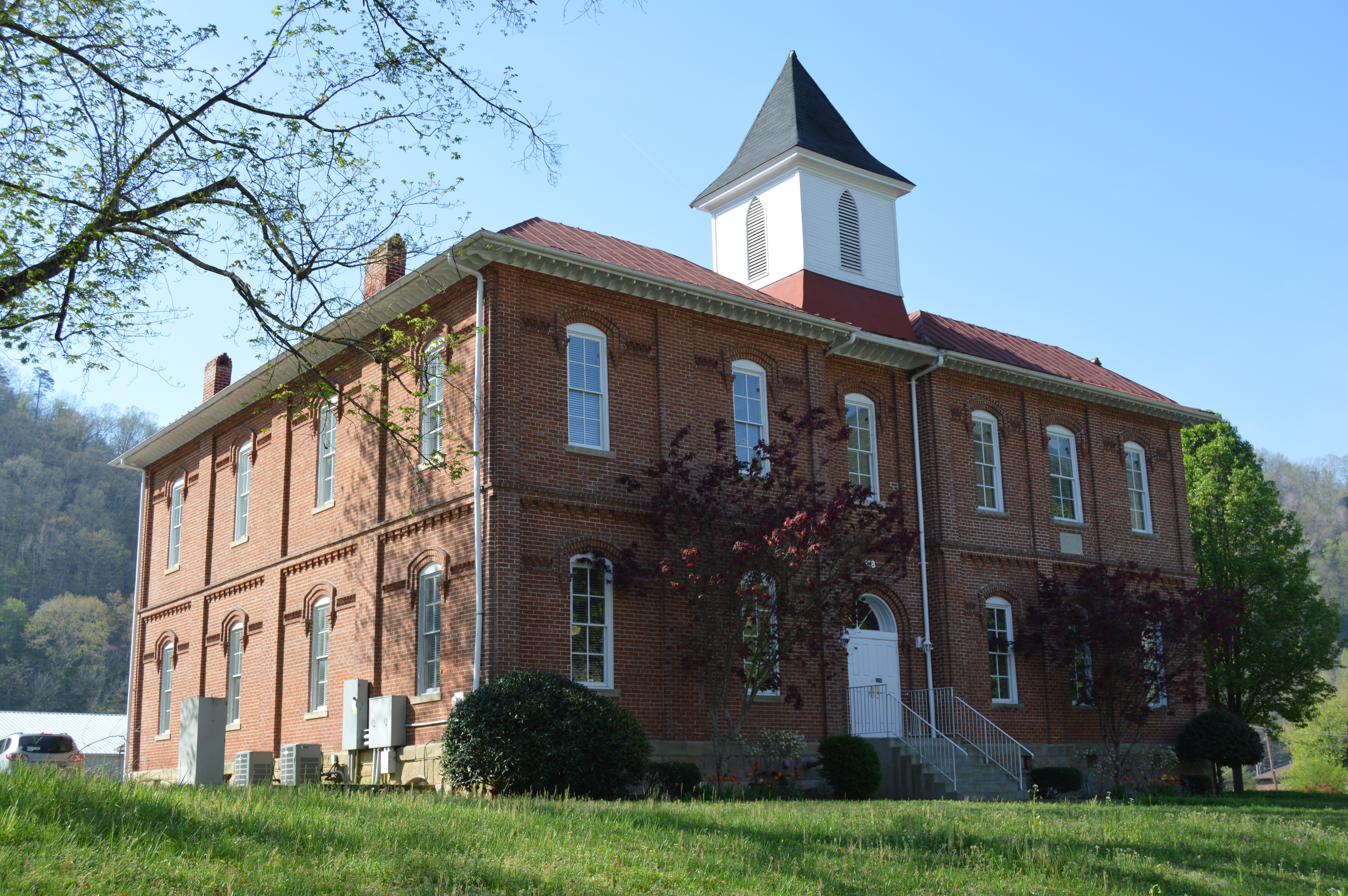
The Academy Building at the University of Pikeville

Pikeville is in the Pike County Public School System, which includes Johns Creek, Milliard, Mullins, and Valley elementary schools (grades K–8), as well as Northpoint Academy, Pikeville High School and Shelby Valley High School (grades 9–12).

The University of Pikeville, a private 4-year institution affiliated with the Presbyterian Church (USA), is in Pikeville. The college is one of the smallest in the nation to have an osteopathic medicine program as part of its curriculum. Founded in 1996, the University of Pikeville Kentucky College of Osteopathic Medicine is one of three medical schools in Kentucky. The city is also home to campuses of the Big Sandy Community and Technical College and National College.

In 2022, Galen College of Nursing and Pikeville Medical Center announced a partnership to operate a campus in downtown Pikeville. Galen College of Nursing is one of the country's largest educators of nurses, with over 30,000 graduates since 1989. Galen College of Nursing (Galen) is accredited by the Southern Association of Colleges and Schools Commission on Colleges (SACSCOC) to award associate, baccalaureate, master's, and doctoral degrees.

== Sister cities ==
- (Republic of Ireland) Dundalk, Ireland
- (United States) Doylestown, Pennsylvania

== Notable people ==
- Woody Blackburn, professional golfer
- Eric C. Conn, former attorney best known for his role in a Social Security fraud scheme
- Robert Damron, professional golfer
- Murray Garvin, basketball head coach, South Carolina State University men's basketball
- Ryan Hall, YouTuber and Internet personality
- Ferrel Harris, racing driver
- John W. Langley, American politician
- Katherine G. Langley, American politician
- Jerry Layne, MLB umpire
- Patty Loveless, country music singer
- Randolph (Randall) McCoy, Patriarch of the McCoy family during the Hatfield-McCoy Feud
- Kevin Mullins, Letcher County District Judge
- Mark Reynolds, baseball player for Colorado Rockies
- John Paul Riddle, self taught aviator and co-founder of Embry–Riddle Aeronautical University
- Effie Waller Smith, poet
- Jack Smith, baseball player for Los Angeles Dodgers
- Preston Spradlin, basketball head coach, James Madison
- Jonny Venters, baseball player for Washington Nationals
- Dwight Yoakam, country singer-songwriter, actor, and film director

== See also ==
- Big Sandy Heritage Center
- Community Trust Bancorp
- East Kentucky Miners
- Eastern Kentucky Expo Center
- Hillbilly Days
- Pike County Airport
- Pikeville Cut-Through
- Pikeville High School
- Pikeville Medical Center
- University of Pikeville
