= Quilt trail =

Series of barn quilts

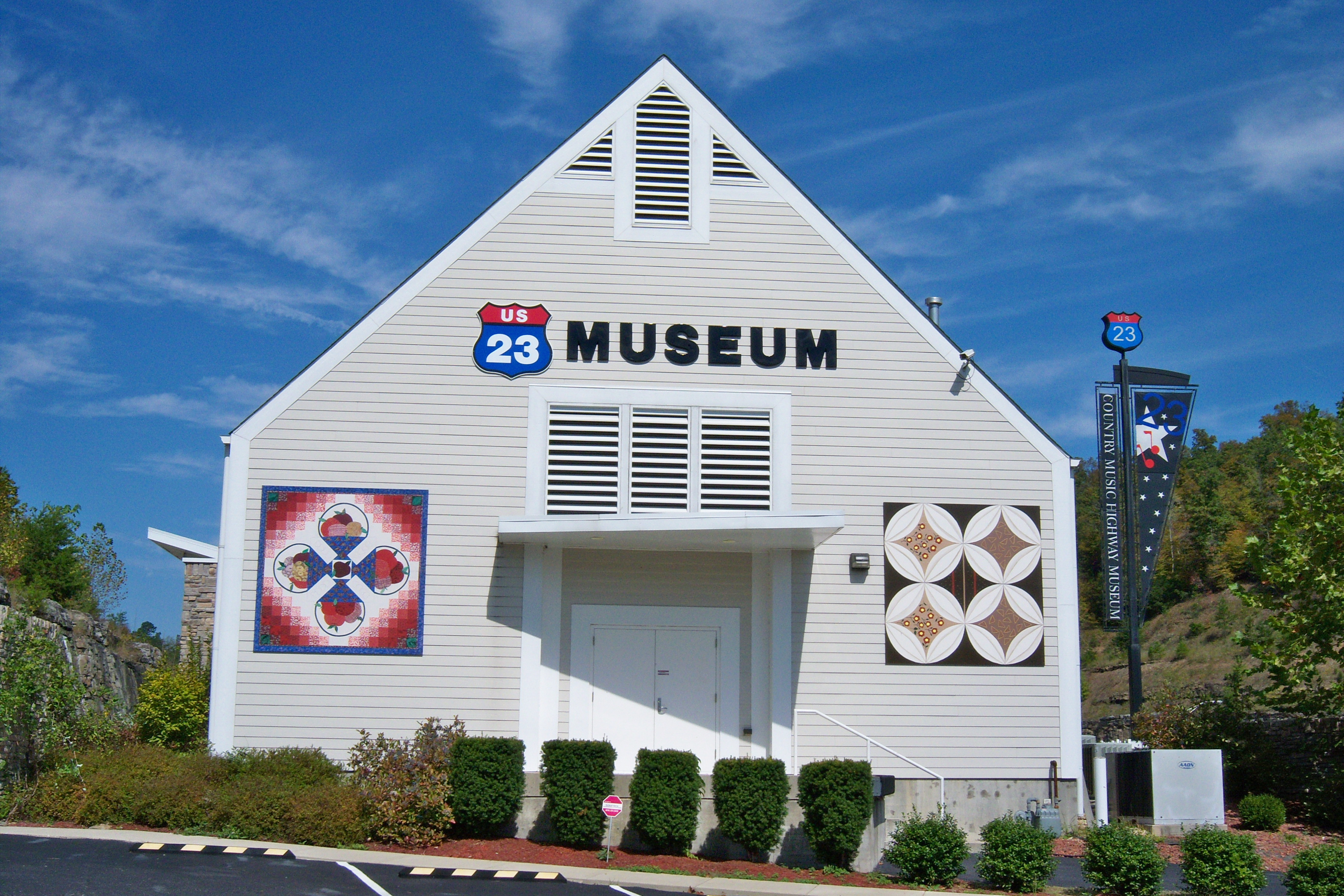
Two barn quilts on the U.S. 23 Country Music Highway Museum in Paintsville, Kentucky on the U.S. 23 Quilt Trail.

A quilt trail is a series of barn quilts (painted wood or metal hung or freestanding quilt squares) installed along a route emphasizing significant architecture and/or aesthetic landscape. Currently North America has 46 quilt trails: 43 in the United States and three in Canada.

== History ==
The first official quilt trail was begun in 2001 in Adams County, Ohio. Donna Sue Groves wanted to honor her mother, Maxine, a noted quilter, with a painted quilt square on the family's barn in Manchester, Ohio. Though many believe that the Groves' farm is home to the first barn quilt, the first was an Ohio Star created as part of a community celebration at a nearby herb farm. The Groves farm later became part of a trail of 20 barn quilts that formed a driving trail throughout Adams County. An emerging concept, a U.S. national quilt trail that first spread across Ohio now includes barn quilts in Arkansas, Colorado, Florida, Georgia, Illinois, Indiana, Iowa, Kansas, Kentucky, Louisiana, Maryland, Michigan, Minnesota, Mississippi, Missouri, Nebraska, New Hampshire, New Jersey, New York, North Carolina, North Dakota, Oregon, Pennsylvania, South Carolina, South Dakota, Tennessee, Texas, Vermont, Virginia, Washington, West Virginia and Wisconsin. In Canada, British Columbia has developed a trail. Barn quilts also exist in Ontario and Kings County, New Brunswick.

== North American quilt trails ==
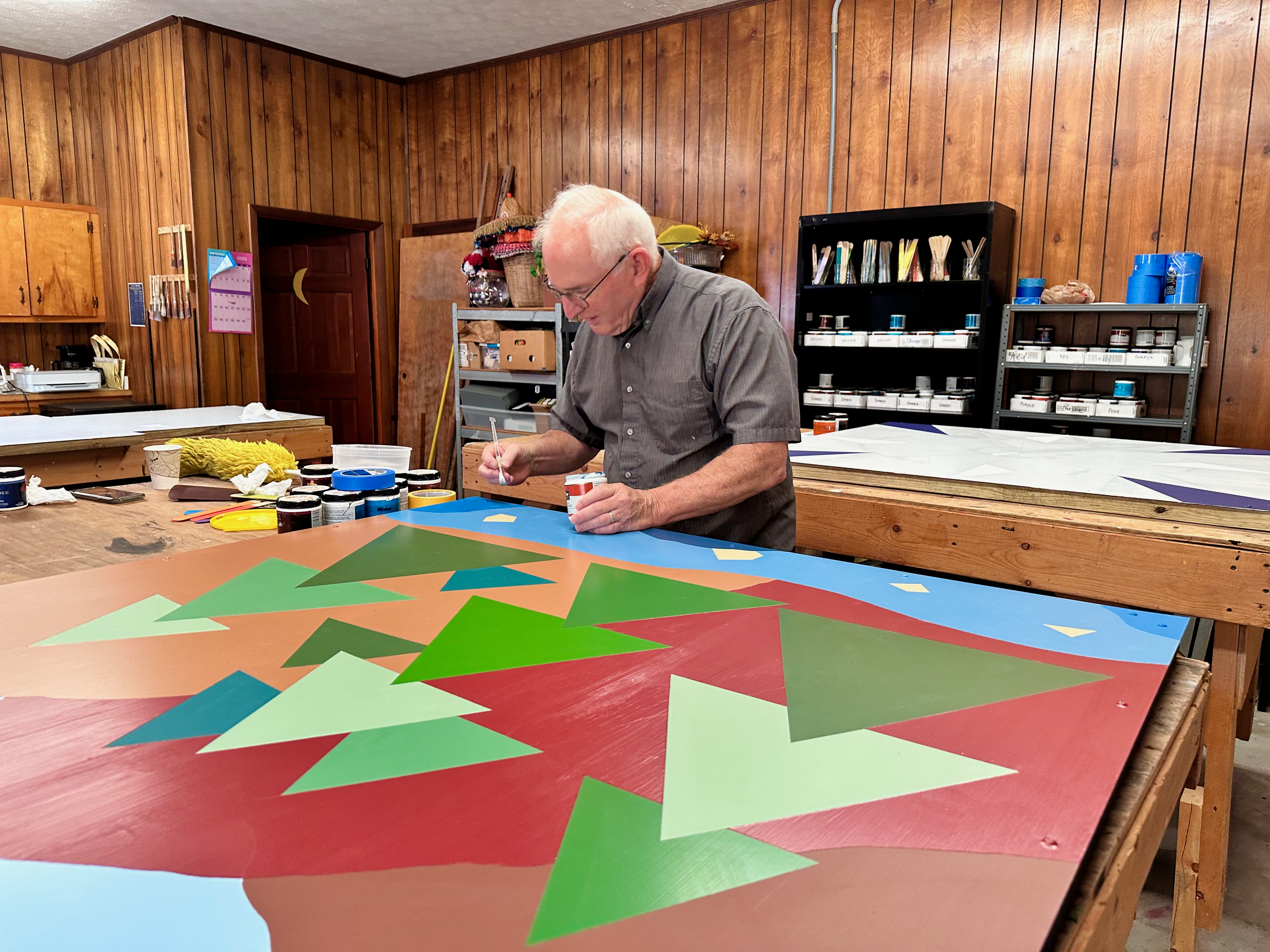
A man paints a barn quilt at a studio in Hayesville, North Carolina

There are quilt trails in over half of the states in the United States, as well as in Canada.

=== Alabama ===
The Alabama Barn Quilt Trail in Lauderdale County plans to expand across the entire state.

=== Florida ===
Historic downtown Trenton is considered the start of the Florida quilt trail. Many quilts can be seen along the I-75 corridor including in White Springs, Madison, and Lake City. Trenton hosts an annual quilt festival on National Quilt Day which falls on the third Sunday in March.

=== Maine ===
A quilt trail exists in Maine, principally in Franklin and Somerset counties.

=== Michigan ===
Michigan is home to three quilt trails. The Old Mission Peninsula Quilt Barns Trail is located on the Old Mission Peninsula, a landmass north of Traverse City known for its cherry production and viticulture. Another quilt trail is located on Michigan's Thumb. An additional quilt trail is located in Mason County, part of West Michigan.

=== North Carolina ===
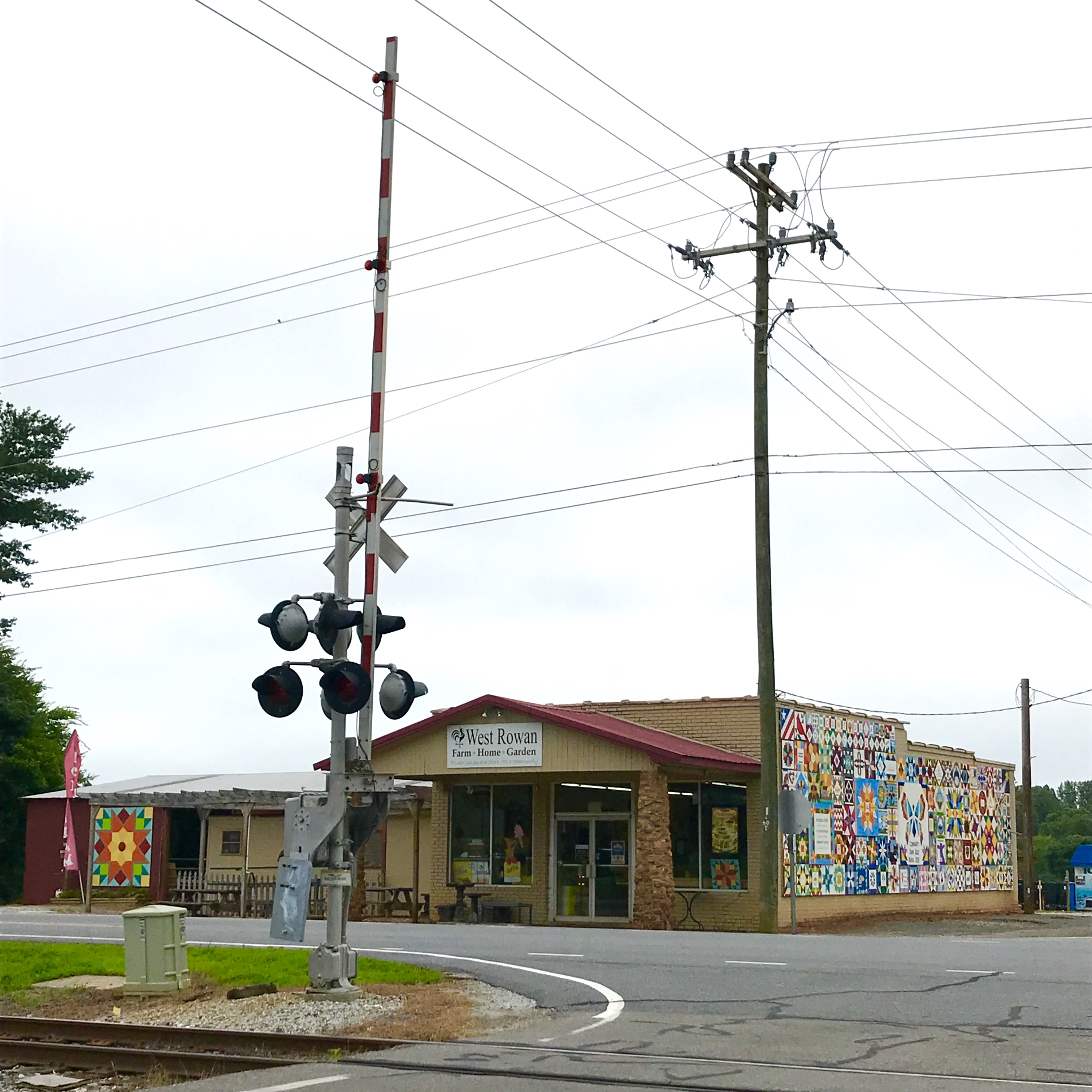
Mount Ulla Barn Quilt, the largest community barn quilt in the United States as of 2019

North Carolina has barn quilt trails in many counties, some formally organized and mapped and others in the development stage at a local level, including in Western Rowan County. Other barn quilt trails include the West Jefferson Barn Quilt Trail, Sampson County Barn Quilt Trail and many others in small towns and counties in both Eastern and Western North Carolina. On July 8, 2019 residents of Mount Ulla installed the largest community barn quilt in the United States on the wall of a local store, West Rowan Farm, Home & Garden. The Mount Ulla Community Barn Quilt measures 500 square feet, twenty square feet larger than the previous title holder, a community barn quilt in Ashland, Kansas.

=== Pennsylvania ===
Pennsylvania Community Partnerships RC & D is currently in the planning stages of a series of quilt trails (PA Quilt Trails), including a railroad quilt trail running from Lewistown to Harrisburg.

=== Tennessee ===
Appalachian Resource Conservation & Development maintains an online quilt trail database for the six-county region of Northeast Tennessee.

=== Utah ===
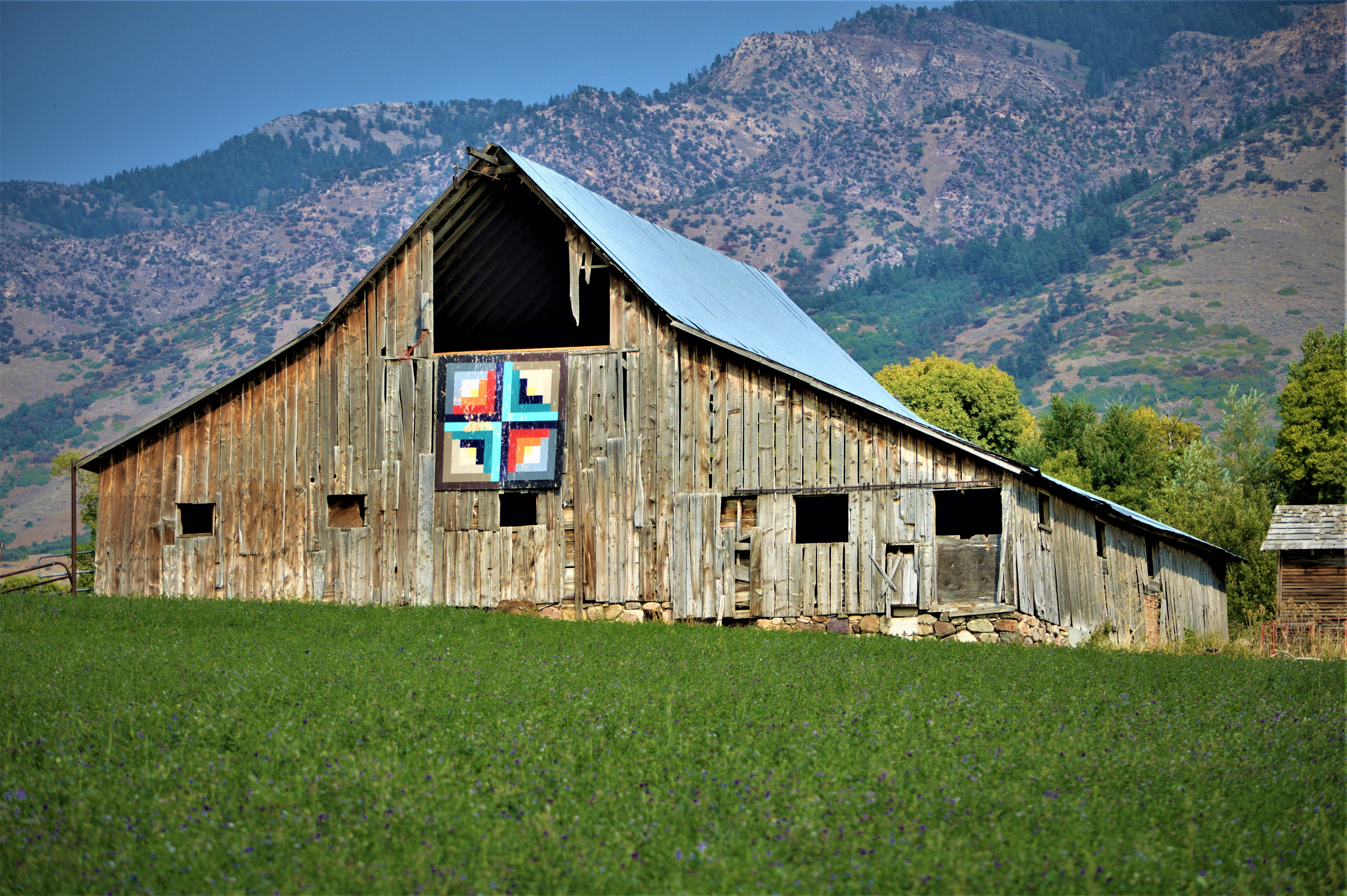
Sunrise and Sunset barn quilt in Richmond, Utah

Barn Quilts of Utah is currently establishing and maintaining quilt trails throughout Utah. The original trail is the Top of Utah Barn Quilt Trail, and additional trails are being added.

=== Canada ===
Numerous rural farming regions in Ontario have local quilt trails, including Huron County, Middlesex County, Prince Edward County and Timiskaming District.

== See also ==
- Barnstar
- Barn advertisement
- History of quilting
- List of North American pieced quilt patterns
