= Mayo Mansion =

Historic house in Kentucky, United States

- John C.C. Mayo Mansion and Office
- U.S. National Register of Historic Places
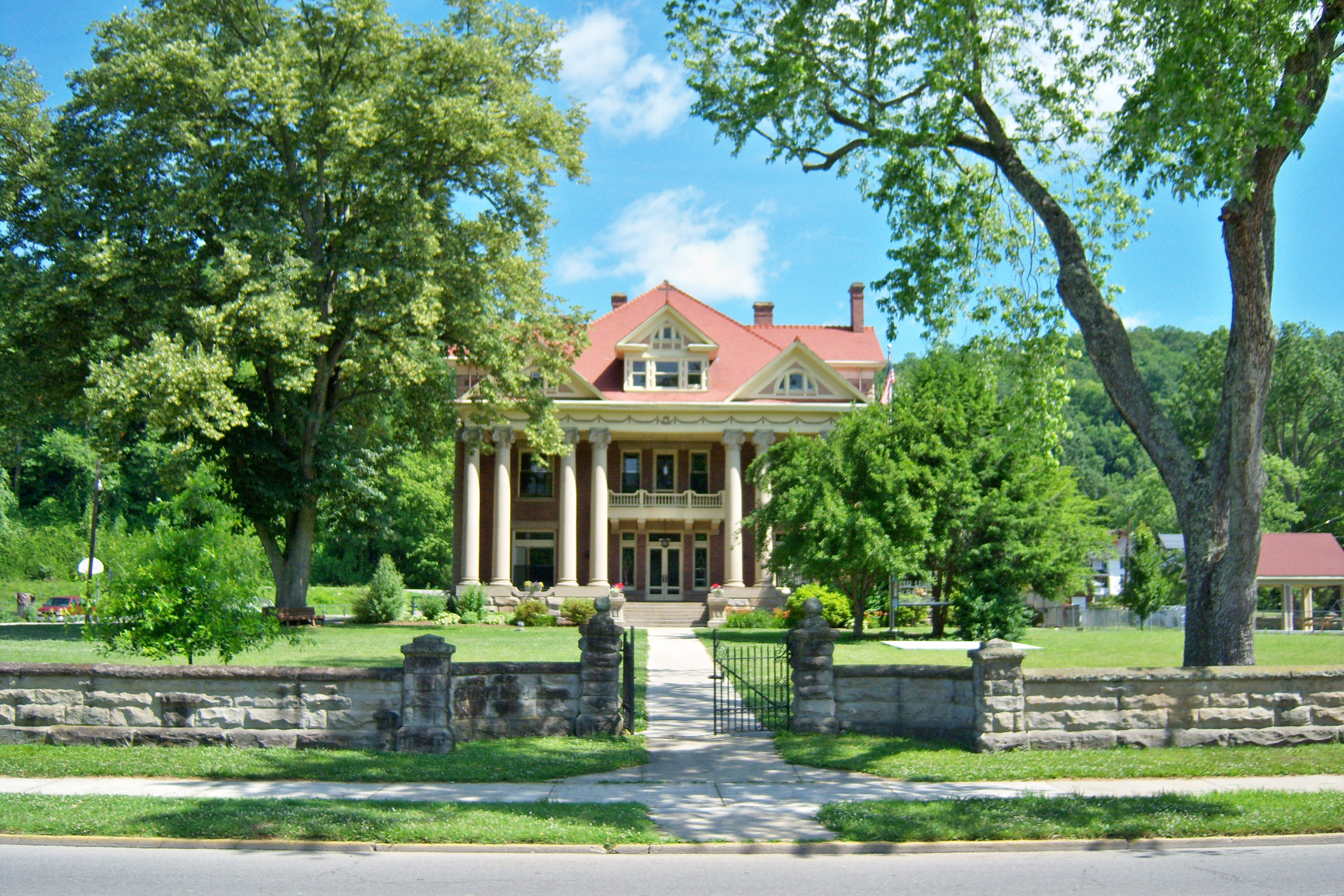

- Location within Kentucky Location within the United States
- Location: 405 Third Street, Paintsville, Kentucky
- Coordinates: 37°48′59″N 82°48′30″W
- Built: 1905–1912
- Architect: Herman Geisky
- Architectural style: Classical Revival
- NRHP reference No.: 74000887
- Added to NRHP: May 3, 1974

Mayo Mansion is a historic mansion at 405 Third Street in Paintsville, Kentucky. It was added to the National Register of Historic Places on May 3, 1974, as John C.C. Mayo Mansion and Office. The mansion is currently occupied by Our Lady of the Mountains School.

Mayo Mansion was built for American entrepreneur John C. C. Mayo. Herman Geisky served as the chief architect during construction.

== History ==
Mayo began develop plans to construct a new estate in Paintsville. Mayo had originally intended to build a mansion with approximately twenty rooms. But, after visiting several other mansions in Central Kentucky, he decided to build a much larger home. After hiring architect Herman Geisky and over one hundred Italian stonemasons from Cincinnati, construction began in 1905.

Due to Paintsville's undeveloped state at the time, there were many challenges during construction. Before the foundation could be built, the land had to drained and filled. Paintsville had not yet constructed a public water system so a private system was developed on the estate that pumped water from a well into a cistern. Rain water was also captured from the roof and was channeled into a cistern. The collected water could then be pumped into the mansion. At the start of the mansion's construction, Paintsville had also not yet received electrical service. Due to this, the original plans called for the use of carbide gas to provide lighting. But, during construction, electric power transmission lines connected Paintsville to a power grid, and the carbide gas system was never installed.

The sandstone used in the construction of the exterior of the mansion was cut and shaped at Thomas Jefferson Mayo's (John Mayo's father) farm, which was located across Paint Creek. The sandstone blocks were then transported across the valley from his father's farm to the construction site on an overhead tram that was 3/4 mile long. After each stone column was shaped, it was transported as three individual pieces using a team of oxen. The team of oxen then had to pull the individual segments of the columns through Paint Creek during the dry season to the mansion. In December 1912, after a cost of $250,000 ($8.34 million in 2025 dollars), the three-story, 43-room mansion was complete.

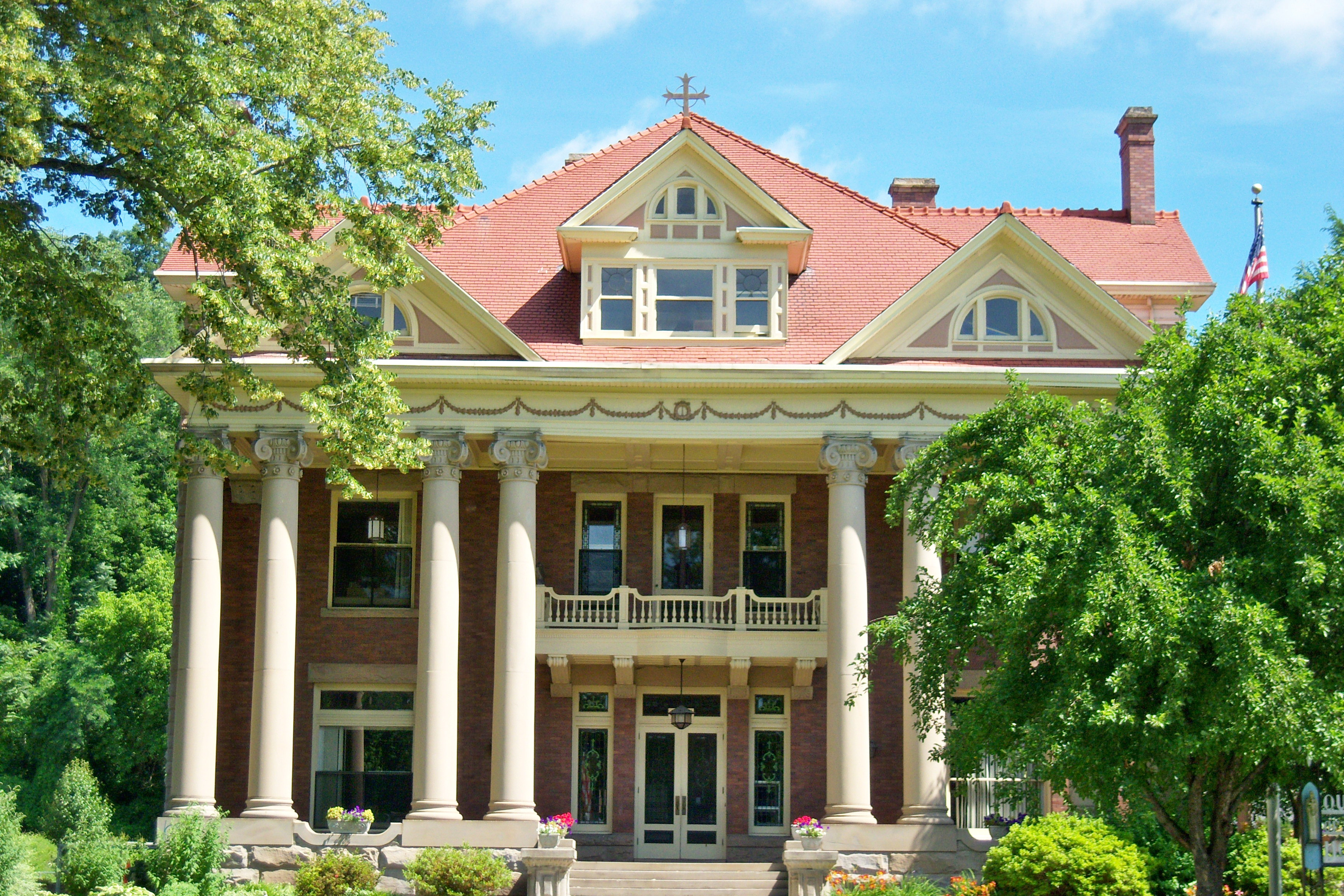
Facade of Mayo Mansion

Mayo died on May 11, 1914. Three years after his death, his wife, Alice Jane Mayo, and his two children moved to Ashland, Kentucky due to the region's isolation. Much of the mansion's interior, including the marble, tile, and furniture, was taken to Ashland where the family constructed a new mansion. The estate was sold to the Sandy Valley Seminary, which was renamed John C. C. Mayo College. After the college closed due to financial difficulties in 1936, the property and estate were given back to Alice. The estate was then sold to E. J. Evans, who was a friend and employee of her husband. In 1945, Evans sold the mansion and property to Most Reverend William T. Mulloy, the Roman Catholic bishop of the Diocese of Covington, Kentucky, at the time. In October of the same year the Sisters of Divine Providence from Melbourne, Kentucky, established Our Lady of the Mountains School, which still occupies the building today.
