= Kentucky Apple Festival =

Coordinates: 37°48′39″N 82°48′10″W

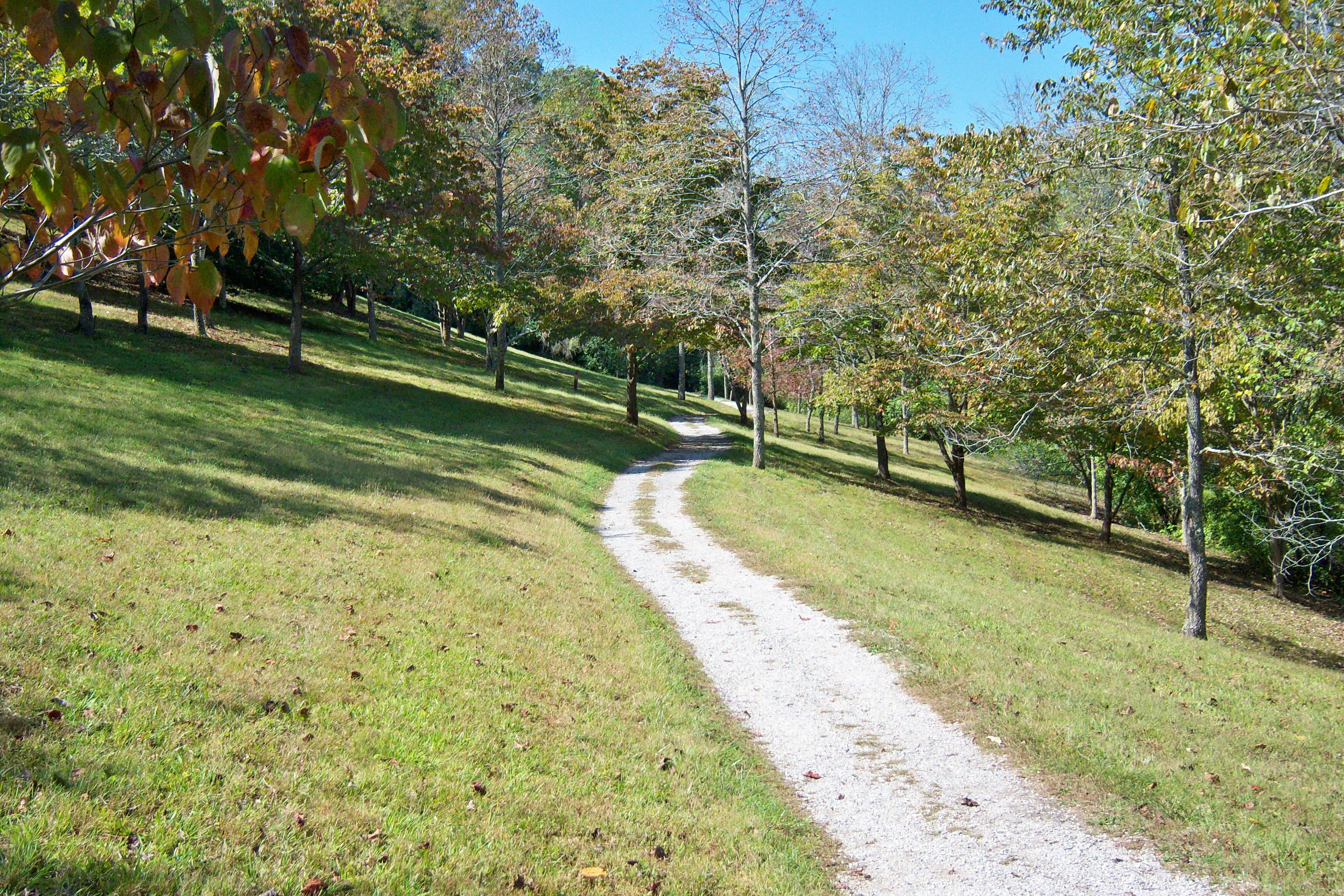
- Genre: Horticultural
- Dates: First weekend in October
- Locations: Paintsville, Kentucky, United States
- Years active: 1962–2019, 2022–
- Website: Kentucky Apple Festival

The Kentucky Apple Festival is an annual festival held in Paintsville, Kentucky during the first Friday and Saturday in October. The festival was originally created in 1962 as a way to provide a market for the county's apple production. During 2020 & 2021 the Kentucky Apple Festival was canceled due to COVID-19. During 2021 the city held the Paintsville Autumn Fest. In 2022 the Kentucky Apple Festival returned and continue their time honored tradition.

== History ==
The first Kentucky Apple Festival was held on October 6, 1962, and was known as "Apple Day". It was guided by Elmon Davis, an officer at Citizens National Bank and apple orchard owner from Flat Gap. Davis not only created the festival to promote the county's apple production, but to compete with the Johnson County Fair, which had been held annually since 1914. Eventually, the Kentucky Apple Festival became the more popular of the two and the Johnson County Fair became nonexistent.

In June 2020, officials decided to scrap the 2020 festival as the COVID-19 pandemic was the cause.

== Traditions ==
Although the majority of the festivities occur on the first Friday and Saturday in October, many events occur during the last week of September, adding up to over forty-five events. Traditional events include: Junior and Miss Apple Blossom pageant; school competitions in spelling, art, penmanship, and mathematics; old-fashion costume contest; terrapin trot (turtle race); multiple concerts; car shows; Ducky Derby (Rubber duck race on Paint Creek) and the Apple Festival Parade. One of the festival's largest and most popular events prior to 2009 was the Apple Bowl. The annual football game between Paintsville High School and Johnson Central High School was halted after 2008 due to the difference in the size of the two schools.
