= The Paintsville Herald =

- Type: Weekly newspaper
- Format: Broadsheet
- Owner(s): Lancaster Management Inc.
- Publisher: Jeff Vanderbeck
- Editor: Waylon W. Whitson
- Founded: May 2, 1901
- Language: English
- Headquarters: 978 Broadway Plaza; Paintsville, Kentucky 41240 United States
- Circulation: 5,200
- Price: USD .50
- Website: paintsvilleherald.com

The Paintsville Herald is a semi-weekly newspaper (printed on Wednesdays and Fridays) covering the city of Paintsville, Kentucky, and the surrounding communities in Johnson County, Kentucky. The newspaper was first published on May 2, 1901.
