= First National Bank Building (Paintsville, Kentucky) =

- First National Bank of Paintsville
- U.S. National Register of Historic Places
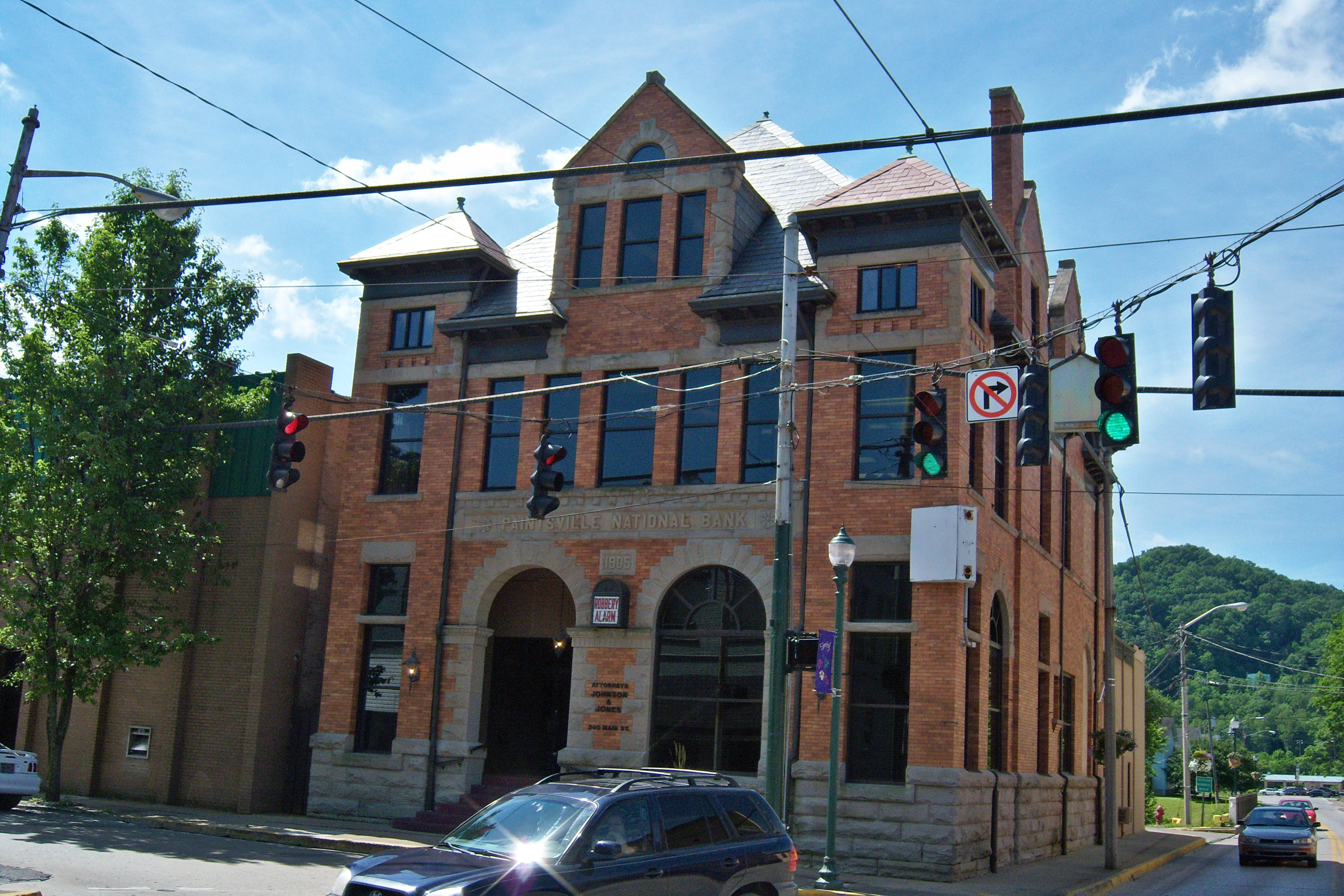

- Location within Kentucky Location within the United States
- Location: 240 Main St., Paintsville, Kentucky
- Coordinates: 37°48′49″N 82°48′20″W
- Area: 0.1 acres (0.040 ha)
- Built: 1902
- Architectural style: Romanesque Revival
- MPS: Johnson County MRA
- NRHP reference No.: 88003154
- Added to NRHP: January 26, 1989

The First National Bank Building, originally the Paintsville National Bank, is a historic structure located in Paintsville, Kentucky.

The bank opened on May 5, 1902, and was added to the National Register of Historic Places on January 26, 1989.
