= U.S. Route 23 =

Highway in the United States

U.S. Route 23
- US 23 highlighted in red

Route information
- Length: 1,435.17 mi (2,309.68 km)
- Existed: 1926–present

Major junctions
- South end: US 1 / US 17 in Jacksonville, FL
- I-95 in Jacksonville, FL; I-16 / I-75 in Macon, GA; I-20 / I-85 in Atlanta, GA; I-40 near Asheville, NC; I-81 near Kingsport, TN; I-64 near Ashland, KY; I-70 / I-71 in Columbus, OH; I-75 in Perrysburg, OH; I-94 in Ann Arbor, MI; I-96 in Brighton, MI
- North end: I-75 at Mackinaw City, MI

Location
- Country: United States
- States: Florida, Georgia, North Carolina, Tennessee, Virginia, Kentucky, Ohio, Michigan

Highway system
- United States Numbered Highway System; List; Special; Divided
← US 22	→ US 24

U.S. Route 23 or U.S. Highway 23 (US 23) is a major north–south United States Numbered Highway between Jacksonville, Florida, and Mackinaw City, Michigan. It is an original 1926 route which originally reached only as far south as Portsmouth, Ohio, and has since been extended. It was formerly part of the major highway known as the Dixie Highway. The highway's southern terminus is in Jacksonville, Florida, at US 1/US 17. The northern terminus is at Interstate 75 (I-75) in Mackinaw City, Michigan.

== Route description ==
Lengths
	mi	km
FL	37.67	60.62
GA	391.69	630.36
NC	109.22	175.77
TN	57.48	92.51
VA	60.91	98.03
KY	157.76	253.89
OH	234.86	377.97
MI	364.92	587.28
Total	1,435.17	2,309.68

=== Florida ===
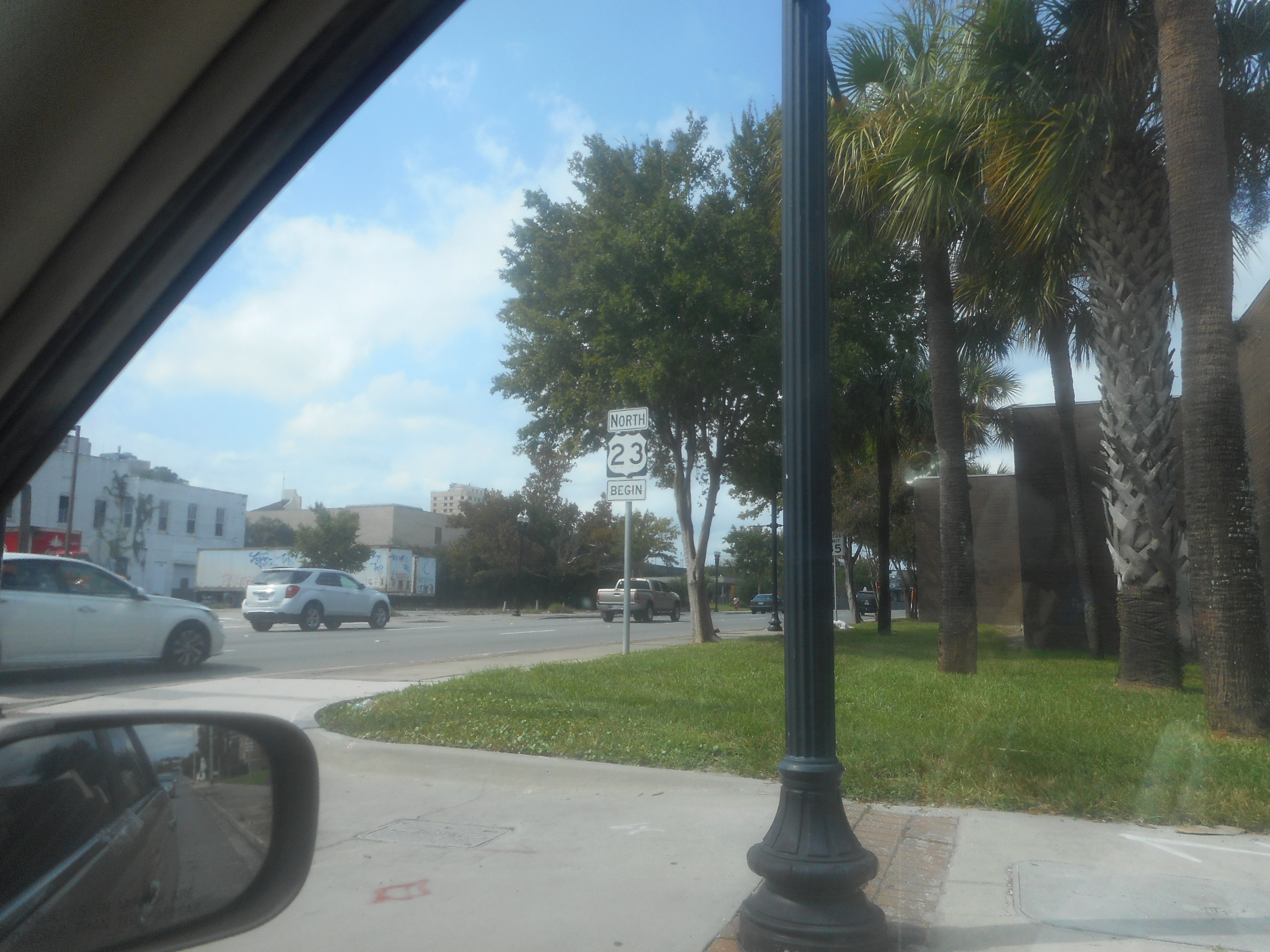
The official southern beginning of US 23 as seen from US 1 and US 17 in Jacksonville, Florida

US 23 begins at US 1/US 17 (Main Street) at the northern end of downtown Jacksonville, starting as a one-way pair, with the northbound lanes meeting with Florida State College at Jacksonville. It is also unsigned State Road 139 (SR 139) from its southern terminus to its interchange with US 1 in northwestern Jacksonville (SR 139 continues east along SR 10A from the end of US 23 to SR 115). West of I-95, US 23 ends the one-way pair, continuing as Kings Road through northwestern Jacksonville, as an off-grid road. A few miles to the west, US 23 meets with US 1/SR 15 (Martin Luther King Jr. Parkway), becoming concurrent with the highway through the rest of its journey through Florida. The road continues northwest, intersecting with I-295 and eventually makes its way out of Jacksonville. At Callahan, US 1/US 23 meets with US 301, beginning a three-way concurrency as the road continues northward toward the St. Marys River, leaving Florida and entering Georgia.

=== Georgia ===
In Georgia, US 23 enters from Florida running concurrently with US 1 and US 301 just south of Folkston. Within Homeland, US 301 branches off and US 23 continues northwesterly with US 1 as a divided four-lane highway toward Waycross where it intersects US 82. US 23 splits from US 1 seven miles (11 km) north of Alma and continues to Hazlehurst as a two-lane highway.

In Hazlehurst, US 23 intersects US 221 and begins running concurrently with US 341, a divided four-lane highway designated the Golden Isles Parkway. Continuing into McRae the highway intersects US 280, US 319, and US 441. In Eastman, US 23 leaves US 341 to intersect I-16 near Macon.

US 23 is two lanes from Eastman to the community of Empire, then five lanes with a center turning lane to the Cochran bypass, which is two lanes. In Cochran, US 23 runs concurrently with US 129 Alternate (US 129 Alt.). North of Cochran, it is undivided four lanes for 13 miles (21 km) to the junction with State Route 96 (SR 96) in Tarversville, then two lanes for the next 24 miles (39 km) to the junction with I-16 near Macon near old Camp Wheeler. North of I-16, US 23, known as Ocmulgee East Boulevard, turns on Emery Highway and then turns onto Spring Street before crossing under I-75 and the Ocmulgee River. After the river, US 23 turns onto Riverside Drive, then parallels the Ocmulgee River and I-75, US 41, and US 80, and leaves US 129 Alt. US 23 then crosses I-75 again and continues to Jackson.

In Henry County, US 23 continues north concurrently with SR 42. US 23 follows Moreland Avenue concurrently with SR 42 in Clayton County and Metro Atlanta, running for several miles in a perfectly straight and due north–south line, which is also the Fulton–DeKalb county line. The highway then turns onto Ponce de Leon Avenue, splitting from SR 42, to follow US 29, US 78, and US 278. Farther along, US 23 turns onto Clairemont Avenue and onto Buford Highway to leave Metro Atlanta. In Buford, US 23 turns right onto SR 20, then onto I-985. The highway intersects US 129 in Gainesville. At the end of I-985, US 23 then continues concurrently with SR 365 north.

US 23 intersects US 123 in Cornelia and begins following US 441. In Clayton, the highway then intersects US 76.

Though US 23 roughly parallels I-75 from Macon to Atlanta, and the two routes come within a few miles in Atlanta, US 23 only intersects with I-75 at the Riverside Drive exit in Macon. It crosses back over I-75 a few miles south. This is the only place that US 23 runs west of I-75 until many miles to the north, in Perrysburg, Ohio, (near Toledo).

=== North Carolina ===
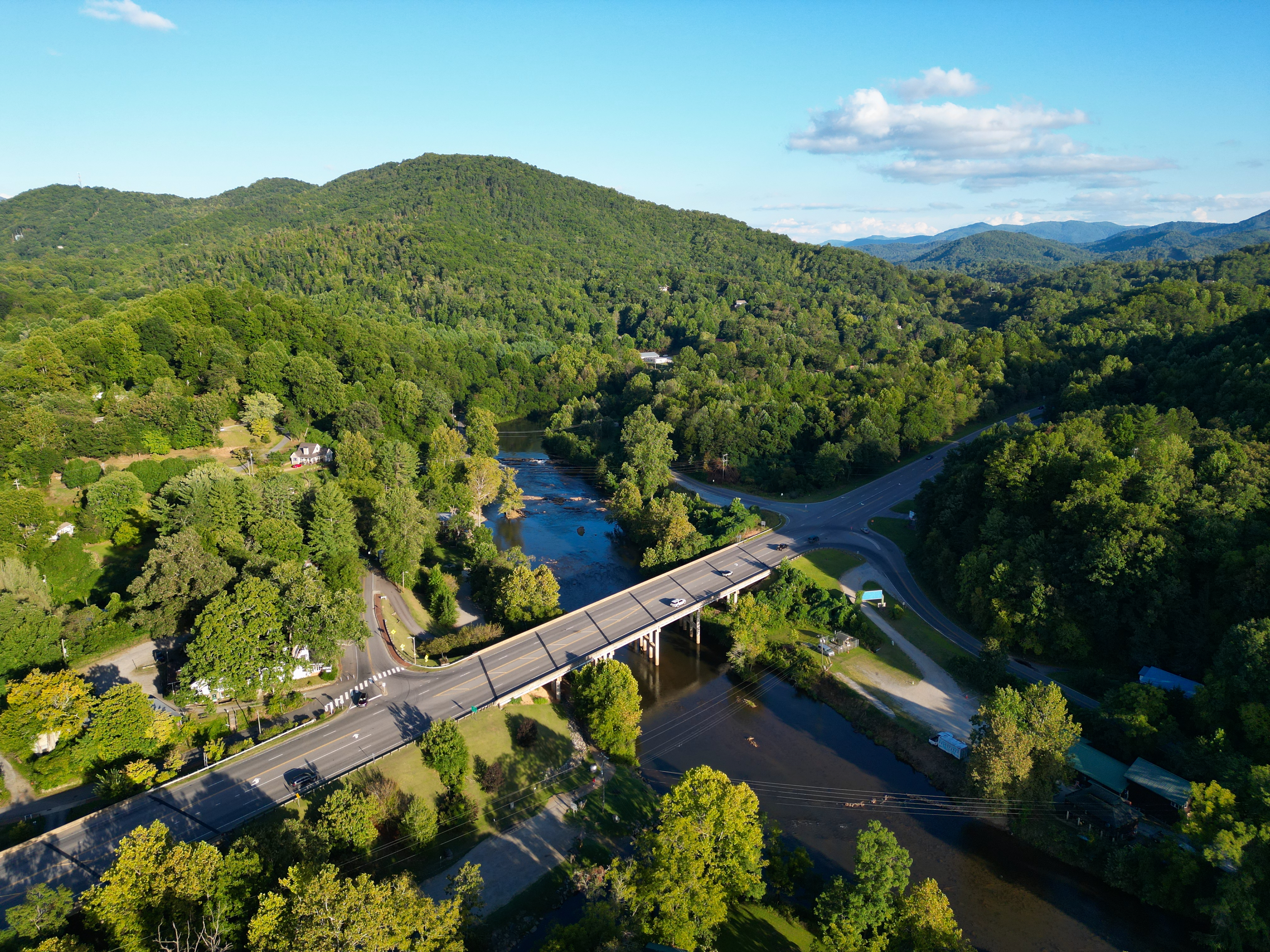
US 23 crosses the Tuckasegee River in Dillsboro, North Carolina

The highway runs concurrent with US 441 between the Georgia state line and Dillsboro, then with US 74 through Waynesville as the Great Smoky Mountains Expressway, followed by US 19 through Canton and Enka–Candler. West of Asheville, the highway follows I-26 to the Tennessee state line.

=== Tennessee ===
US 23 runs concurrently with the newly upgraded I-26 from the North Carolina state line past Johnson City and Kingsport. Just west of Kingsport and I-81, I-26 stops at the junction with US 11W, and US 23 continues to run north to the Virginia state line.

=== Virginia ===
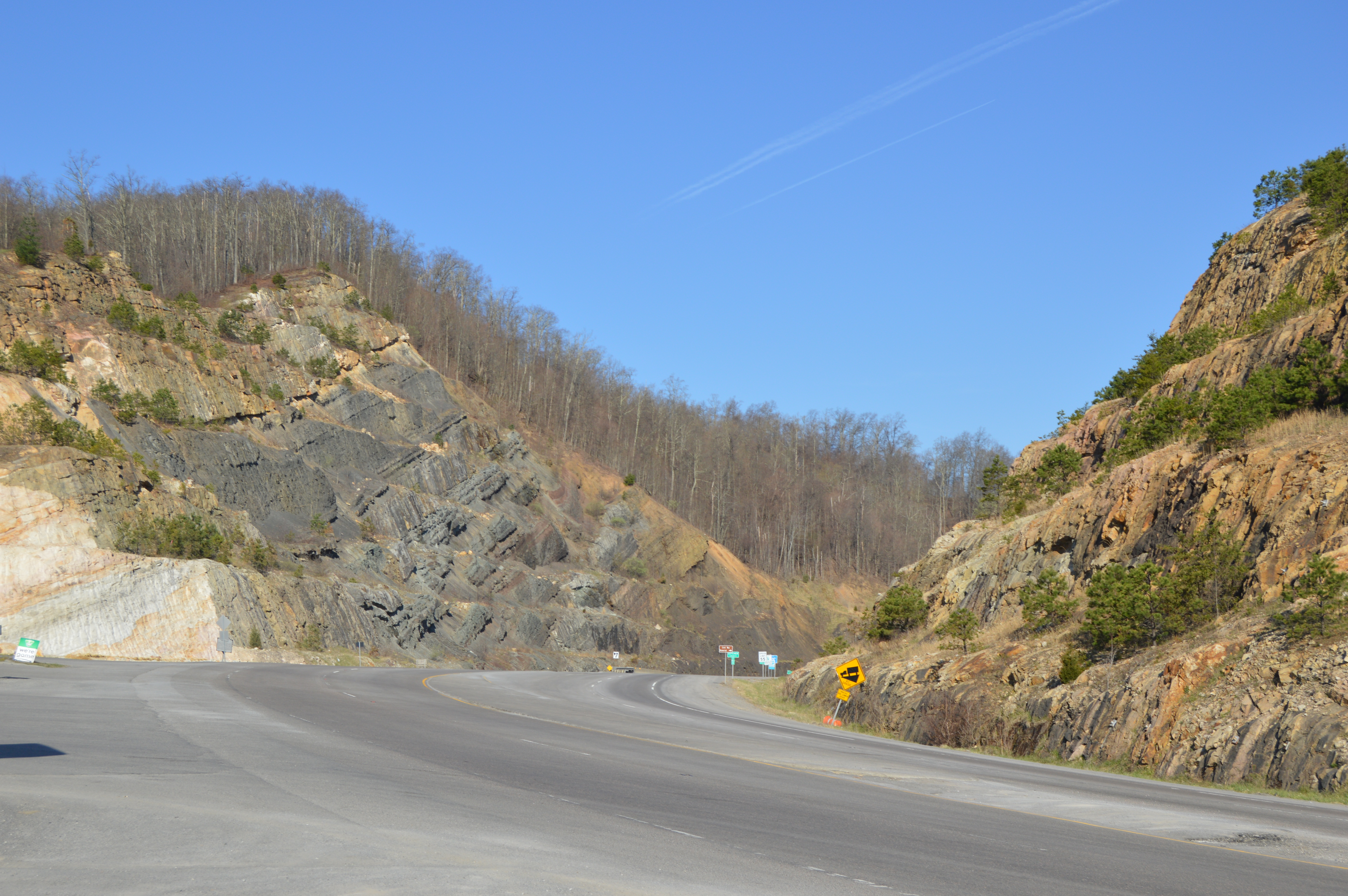
Pound Gap, where the highway crosses from Virginia to Kentucky

US 23 extends for 61 miles (98 km) through far Southwest Virginia with the southern point beginning at Weber City and the northern point ending at Pound. It runs concurrent with US 58 and US 421 from Gate City to Duffield. It crosses the Clinch River near Clinchport. From Duffield to Big Stone Gap, it passes through the George Washington and Jefferson National Forests. The entire route is a four-lane divided highway. The stretch of highway is known as The Crooked Road: Virginia's Heritage Music Trail and is a symbol of the highway's importance to country music.

US 23 passes by the following towns, cities, and counties in Virginia as well: Gate City in Scott County; Norton (an independent city); and Big Stone Gap and Pound in Wise County.

=== Kentucky ===
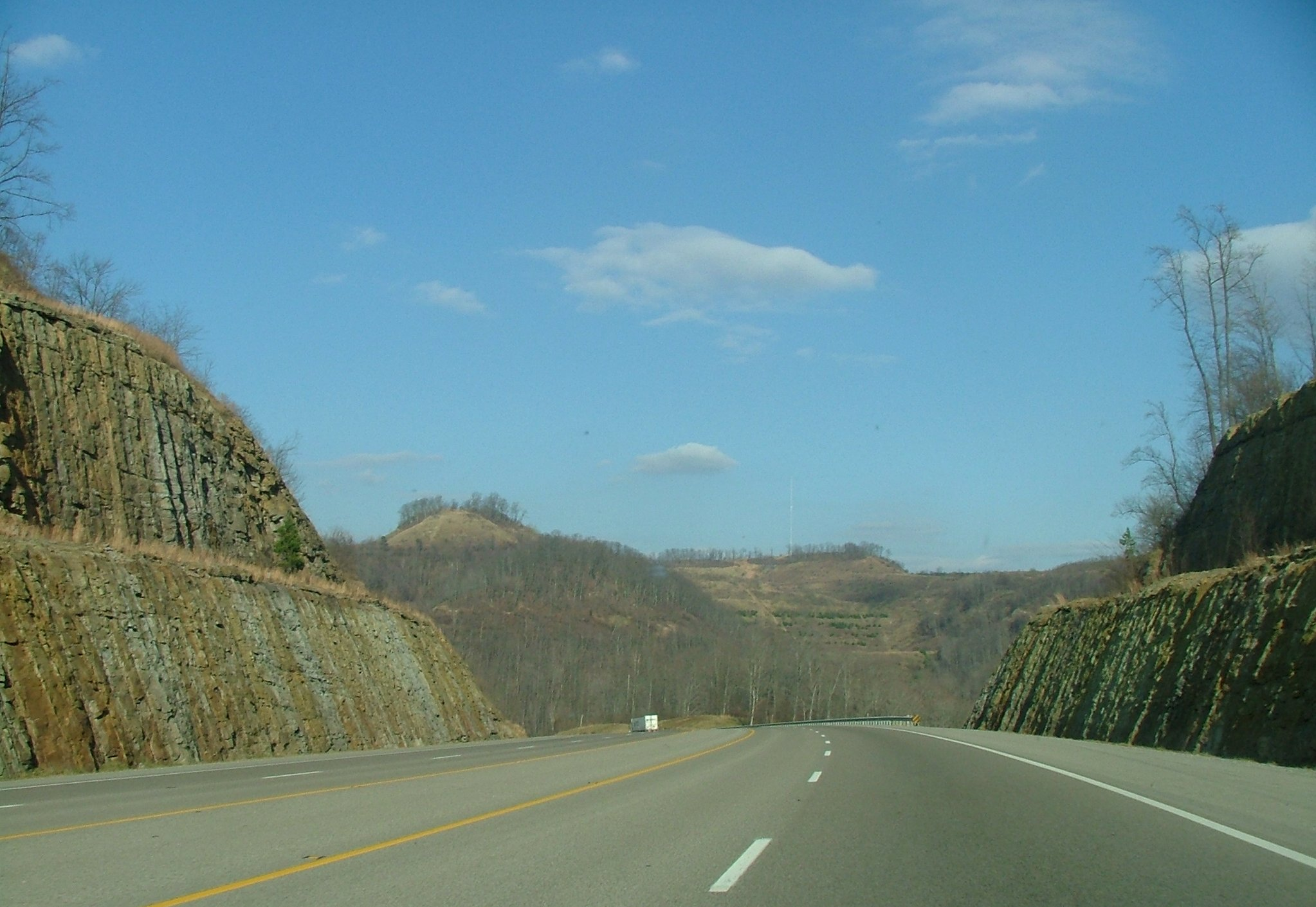
US 23 in Pike County south of Pikeville, Kentucky

US 23 is known as the "Country Music Highway" as it enters Kentucky from Virginia after crossing Pound Gap near Whitesburg. Loretta Lynn, Dwight Yoakam, Billy Ray Cyrus, Patty Loveless, Crystal Gayle, Chris Stapleton, Hylo Brown, and more are all noted along US 23's path through Kentucky. US 23 combines with US 119 near Pikeville and continues northward. Just south of Pikeville, it joins US 460 and Kentucky Route 80 (KY 80). It then passes through the Pikeville Cut-Through and US 119 diverges from the route near Coal Run Village. KY 80 splits to the south from US 23 near Prestonsburg, and US 460 splits to the west in Paintsville. US 23 then passes through the outer edge of Louisa and intersects I-64 in Catlettsburg. The highway also begins to run concurrently with US 60 from Catlettsburg to Ashland.

In Ashland, US 23 follows Winchester Avenue and then Greenup Avenue through downtown. Winchester Avenue continues north from 33rd Street as US 23 Business (US 23 Bus.) until rejoining US 23 at 6th Street. From here, US 23 passes the Ashland Town Center Mall and the Melody Mountain shopping district before exiting the city limits. Continuing north near Bellefonte, the highway passes AK Steel's Ashland Works then enters Greenup County. It passes several shopping centers and downtown Russell and then briefly enters Flatwoods before entering Raceland along the southern banks of the Ohio River. After passing through the cities of Wurtland, Greenup, and South Shore, the highway crosses the Ohio River at South Portsmouth and enters Ohio at Portsmouth.

Since 1999, the entire Kentucky portion is a four-lane highway; in some of the larger cities, there are additional traffic lanes present in both directions. In northeastern Kentucky, from the I-64 junction north into Ohio, some sections are four-lanes undivided, with a double yellow line instead of a median. These are the oldest four-lane sections of US 23 in Kentucky which were upgraded in 1950s and 1960s before divided highways became the design standard. They can be found on US 23 in the cities of Catlettsburg, Ashland, and Russell.

=== Ohio ===
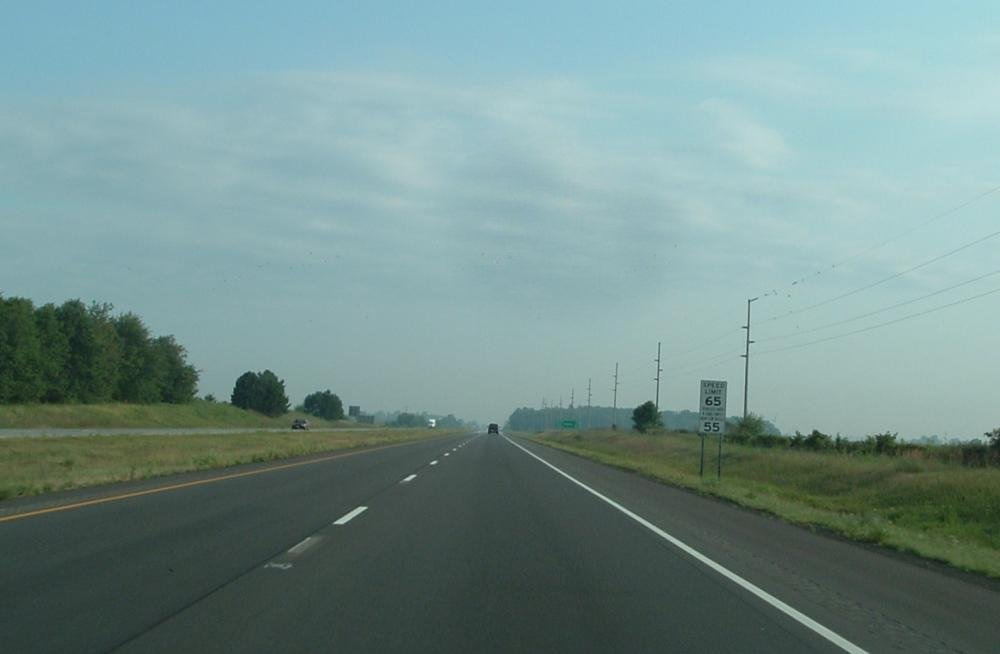
US 23 near Marion, Ohio

The majority of US 23 in Ohio is a divided expressway, with the exception of downtown Columbus and the portion of the route between Carey and US 20 east of Perrysburg.

US 23 crosses the Ohio River from Kentucky, enters Portsmouth, and passes through the towns of Lucasville, Piketon, Waverly, Chillicothe, and Circleville, before reaching Columbus. The highway then mostly follows High Street in Columbus, which was the original route. However, it now bypasses the central business district and northern Columbus neighborhoods by following the one-way pairing of 4th Street (northbound) and 3rd/Summit Street (southbound) between the downtown area and Hudson Street, and Indianola Avenue north before returning to its original course on High Street at Morse Road. US 23 then follows High Street northbound from Columbus, going through Worthington, passing the village of Lewis Center, entering Delaware at the Cheshire Road intersection. After US 23 intersects the northern terminus of State Route 315 (SR 315) and passes a retail district, it becomes a limited-access freeway, bypassing downtown Delaware, before resuming as an expressway with at-grade crossings north of the city.

At Waldo, US 23 again becomes a freeway. It continues as a freeway throughout most of Marion County, then resumes at-grade crossings with a mix of some freeway-style junctions which are otherwise signalized after the Morral interchange. US 23 runs concurrently with divided SR 15 until it takes a different route at the Carey exit. SR 15 continues on to Findlay and is designed to allow most traffic to bypass the northern stretch of US 23 by offering a fast connection to I-75. US 23 continues north through Carey, Fostoria, and Risingsun.

West of Woodville, US 23 intersects US 20, where it has an overlap for several miles. US 23 then joins I-75 near Perrysburg, then follows I-475 around the west side of Toledo, passing through Sylvania before entering Michigan. In the portion where I-75 and US 23 overlap, this is a wrong-way concurrency, with southbound I-75 concurrent with northbound US 23, and northbound I-75 concurrent with southbound US 23 in this stretch.

US 23 passes near the birthplace of President Rutherford B. Hayes in Delaware, as well as near the home of President Warren G. Harding in Marion.

=== Michigan ===
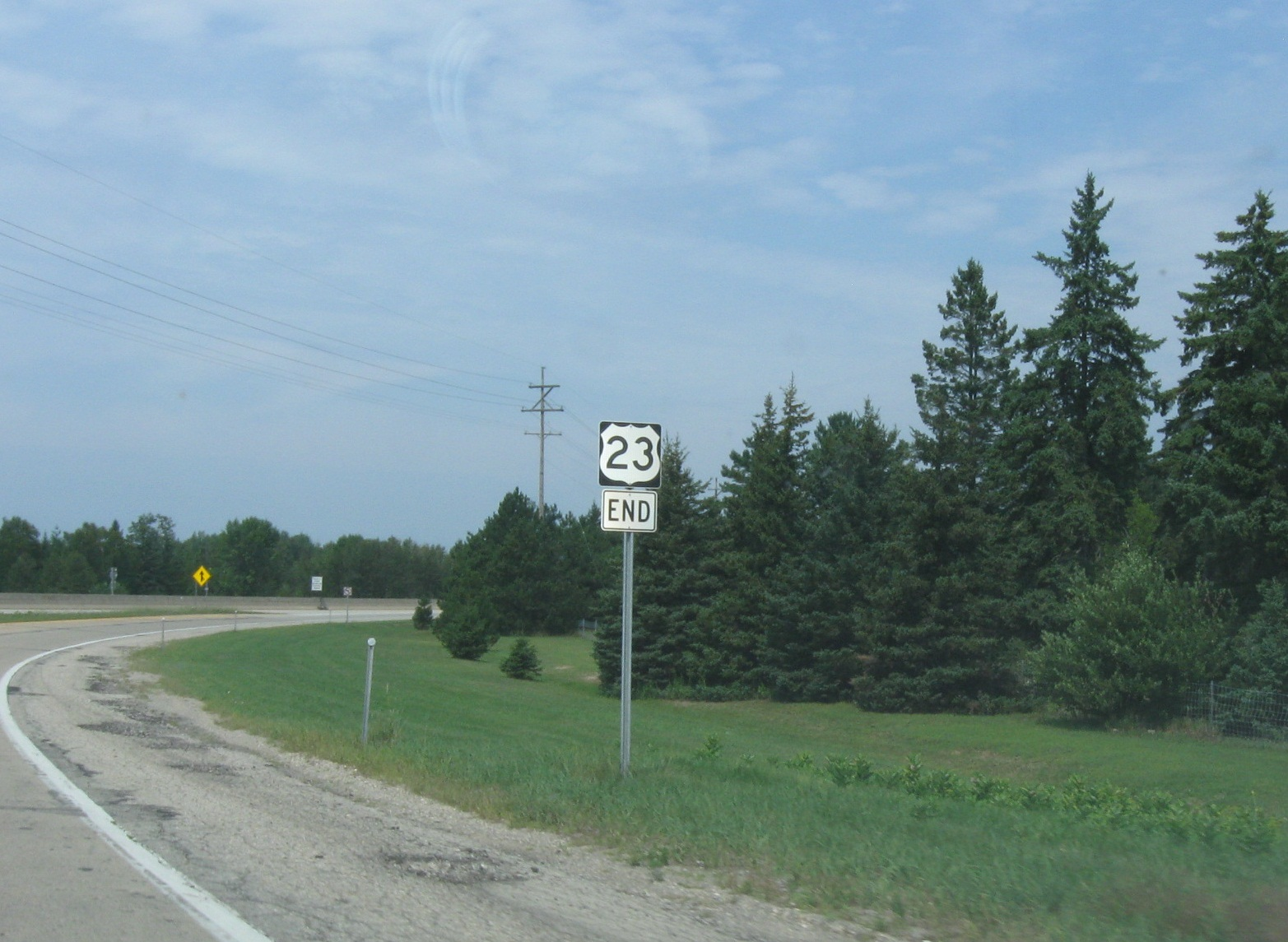
Northern terminus of US 23, Mackinaw City, Michigan

In Southeast Michigan, US 23 serves as a north–south bypass to the west of Metro Detroit. US 23 enters Michigan as a full freeway, sharing a brief concurrency with US 223 until that highway splits west toward Adrian. US 23 continues north to Ann Arbor, where it intersects I-94 and bypasses the city to the east and north, before turning northbound once more. US 23 shares an interchange with I-96 at Brighton before continuing north to the Flint area, where it begins a nearly 74-mile (119 km) concurrency with I-75. The combined freeway passes to the west of Flint, sharing an interchange with I-69, before continuing north toward Saginaw and Bay City.

US 23 enters Northern Michigan south of Standish, exiting the I-75 freeway at a trumpet interchange and continuing easterly on a short freeway before intersecting M-13, where US 23 turns northbound along a two-lane road. Beginning here, US 23 follows the shoreline of Lake Huron northerly, passing through cities such as Tawas City, Alpena, and Cheboygan. US 23 ends at a directional interchange with I-75 in Mackinaw City, just south of the approach to the Mackinac Bridge.

== History ==
Originally known as the Columbus–Sandusky Turnpike, the road was laid out about 1820. Within four years, it was noted as having frequent use, although it was in poor condition. As a result, on February 10, 1824, James Kilbourne of the Ohio House of Representatives introduced a petition to revise and correct the state road leading from Columbus and Worthington to Delaware, Norton, and further north. Kilbourne believed that the Sandusky Bay was the perfect place for a harbor to open up the Ohio marketplace to New England. He fought relentlessly to establish roads from the capital to Sandusky. He laid out a southern extension of the road to tie Portsmouth on the Ohio River to the central and northern parts of the state. As a result of Kilbourne's efforts, the state of Ohio chartered the Columbus and Sandusky Turnpike Company on January 31, 1826. The following year, the federal government gave 31,840 acres (12,890 ha) in trust to the state of Ohio for the turnpike company to finance road improvements and development.

An 1820 map of Ohio shows the turnpike leading from Columbus to Worthington, through Delaware into Marion County. The southern portion of the improved road was built and in use by 1828. The Columbus–Sandusky Turnpike, also sometimes known as Kilbourne Highway, was completed to Sandusky in 1834. Although the Turnpike was much needed and well traveled, the Columbus and Sandusky Turnpike Company did not have the funds to maintain the road. Early maps show the route as "Mud Pike". Angry at the poor, muddy condition of the road, particularly in the rainiest seasons, travelers occasionally destroyed tollgates. The Columbus and Sandusky Turnpike Company was disbanded February 28, 1843, when the Ohio legislature repealed the act that incorporated it. Two years later, an act was passed that established the road as a public highway.

US 23 was established in 1926 as part of the original U.S. Numbered Highway System. The original route began at US 52 in Portsmouth, Ohio, and followed the old turnpike north to Sandusky, where it continued north to end at US 31 in Mackinaw City, Michigan.

In 1929, US 23 was extended from Portsmouth, Ohio, into Kentucky, ending at Pikeville. The following highways form the original route of US 23:

- Former US 23 Bus. through Pikeville
- KY 1428, Allen to Prestonsburg
- KY 321, Prestonsburg to north of Paintsville
- KY 2565 into Louisa from the south
- KY 3, Louisa to south of Catlettsburg
- KY 3294, Catlettsburg

The southern terminus remained in Pikeville for only two years. In 1930, US 23 was extended to Atlanta.

A US 23 shield used in Florida prior to 1993

US 23 was extended into Florida along US 1 in 1951. When the 20th Street Expressway was built around downtown Jacksonville, US 1 was moved but US 23 remained. It has never changed its route in Florida, though during the early-to-mid-1960's, it was planned to extend south, maybe to Fort Myers via US 17, SR 19, SR 33, US 98, and SR 31. Later, the proposed southern terminus was scaled back to Lake Alfred at US 17/92 near Winter Haven. Both proposals were denied by the American Association of State Highway Officials.

In the mid-to=late 20th century when the coal industry declined in the Appalachian Mountains, US 23 was often dubbed the Hillbilly Highway, and it was said the three "R's" of the region were "reading, writing and Route 23", as workers migrated to northern industrial cities such as Detroit, Cleveland, Columbus, or Chicago. The Dwight Yoakam song "Readin', Rightin', RT.23" and the Steve Earle song "Hillbilly Highway" in particular reflect this heritage.

In 1985, US 23 was upgraded to Interstate standards on the initiative of Eddie Williams, chief executive officer of economic development for Johnson City, Jonesborough, and Washington County, Tennessee. "The original idea for that project happened in 1985, when two young men [later named as Don Kiel and Alan Bridwell] walked into my office with a plan to upgrade Highway 23 to interstate standards", Williams said. "And all it cost us was to change the signs." Later that year, a section of US 23 near Johnson City was designated as I-181, the first section of US 23 to be designated as an Interstate in either Tennessee or North Carolina. Williams claims that this project was a catalyst for the five-state I-26 extension project.

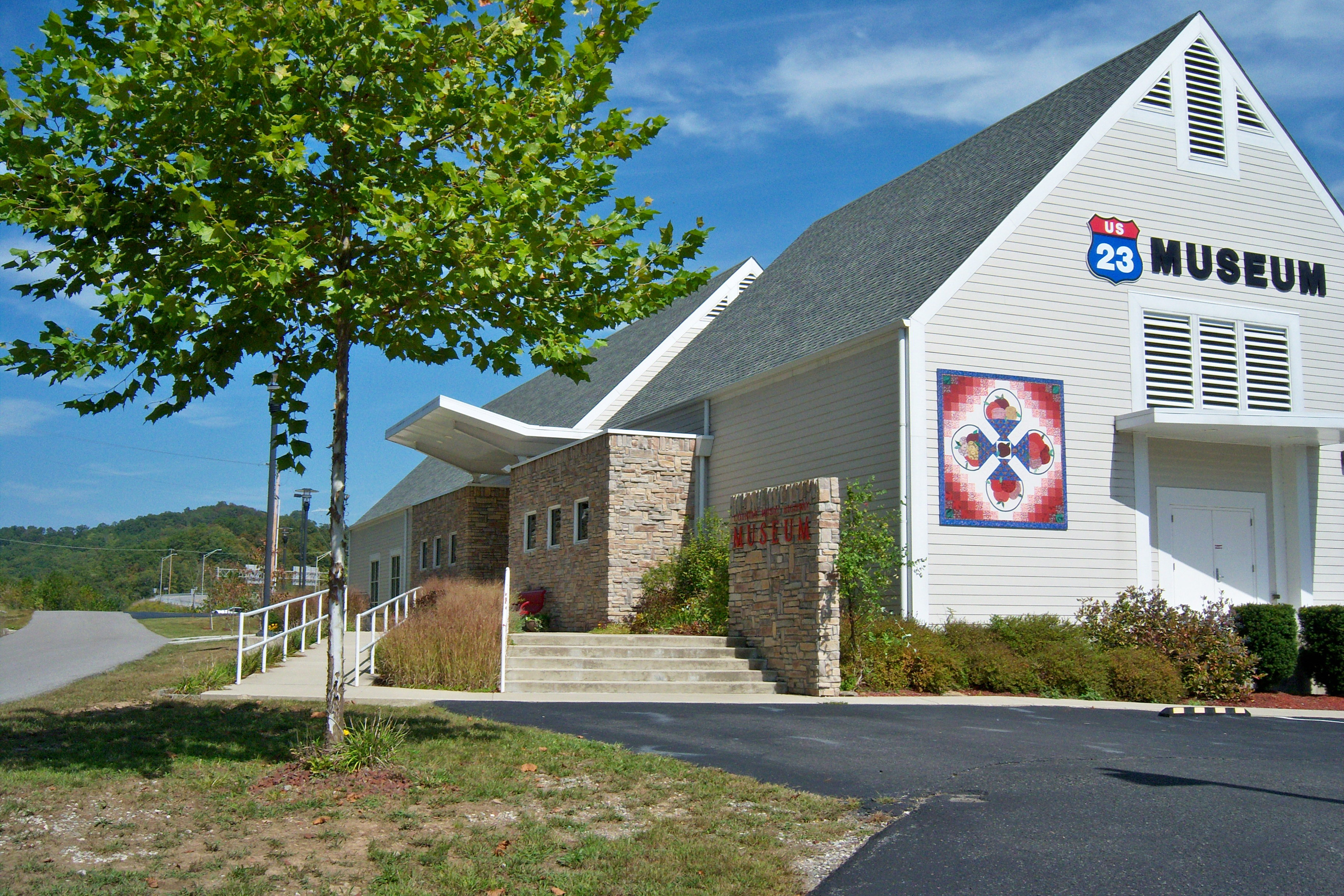
The U.S. 23 Country Music Highway Museum in Paintsville, Kentucky is dedicated to the country musicians who grew up near US 23

On March 1, 1994, a bill sponsored by State Representative Hubert Collins was passed by the Kentucky General Assembly. This bill allowed US 23 to become known as "The Country Music Highway" in order to recognize all the country music stars that had come from the counties the highway passed through. At every county line, there is a sign that lists the country music star or stars from that county. Also, in the early 2000s, the U.S. 23 Country Music Highway Museum opened in Paintsville to further commemorate these legendary people.

Law enforcement officials from Ohio and Kentucky set up the "US Route 23 Drug Taskforce" in 1996 to patrol the highway for drug trafficking, attempting to halt a major artery of drug networks bringing high-quality cannabis grown in Kentucky north for distribution in Ohio and elsewhere. Lately, it has been primarily used to stop the flow of narcotics from large Ohio cities like Columbus, Dayton, and Cleveland into Portsmouth, all of which have to pass through US 23 to reach Portsmouth. Signs can be spotted along US 23 in Ohio from Portsmouth to Columbus warning traffickers that efforts have been taken to prevent their actions. Some random police stings have been set up at portions of the highway.

During the past few years, the highway has been widened to four or more lanes through its entire length within Kentucky and is one of the more scenic routes in Kentucky. It is six lanes in parts of the city of Pikeville. In 2002, it was officially named a National Scenic Byway.

US 23 also gains attention during college football season as it holds a direct connection between Ann Arbor, Michigan (home of the University of Michigan) and Columbus, Ohio (site of Ohio State University) and the Michigan–Ohio State football rivalry. Each year at the end of November, a convoy of fans travels either north or south depending on where that year's game is being held. Unsubstantiated rumors that the host state of that year's game has their state police (either the Michigan State Police or Ohio State Highway Patrol) force an increase enforcement of traffic laws along the route in their respective states to cite opposing fans adds to the rivalry.

== Major intersections ==
Florida
US 1 / US 17 in Jacksonville. US 17/US 23 travel concurrently through the city.
I-95 / US 17 in Jacksonville
US 1 in Jacksonville. The highways travel concurrently to north of Alma, Georgia.
I-295 in Jacksonville
US 301 in Callahan. The highways travel concurrently to Homeland, Georgia.
Georgia
US 82 in Waycross. The highways travel concurrently to west of Deenwood.
US 84 in Waycross. The highways travel concurrently through the city.
US 341 in Hazlehurst. The highways travel concurrently to Eastman.
US 221 in Hazlehurst. The highways travel concurrently through the city.
US 280 / US 319 / US 441 in McRae
I-16 in Smithsonia
US 80 east of Macon. The highways travel concurrently to Macon.
US 129 in Macon. The highways travel concurrently through the city.
I-16 in Macon
I-75 in Macon
I-75 in Macon
I-75 northwest of Macon
I-675 south-southwest of Rex
I-285 north of Conley
I-20 on the East Atlanta–Edgewood neighborhood line
US 29 / US 78 / US 278 on the Poncey-Highland–Atkins Park neighborhood line. US 23/US 29/US 78 travel concurrently to Decatur. US 23/US 278 travel concurrently to Druid Hills.
I-85 on the North Druid Hills–Brookhaven city line
I-285 in Doraville
I-985 in Buford. The highways travel concurrently to Gainesville.
US 129 in Gainesville. The highways travel concurrently through the city.
US 441 northwest of Cornelia. The highways travel concurrently to north-northwest of Dillsboro, North Carolina.
US 123 east-southeast of Clarkesville
US 76 in Clayton. The highways travel concurrently through the city.
North Carolina
US 64 in Franklin. The highways travel concurrently around the southeastern edge of the city.
US 74 / US 441 north-northwest of Dillsboro. US 23/US 74 travel concurrently to west of Clyde.
US 276 in Waynesville
US 19 in Lake Junaluska. The highways travel concurrently to northeast of Mars Hill.
I-40 / US 74 in Asheville
Future I-26 / I-240 in Asheville. I-26/US 23 travel concurrently to northeast of Mars Hill. I-240 travel concurrently through the city.
I-240 / US 70 in Asheville. US 23/US 70 travel concurrently to Weaverville.
US 25 in Woodfin. The highways travel concurrently to Weaverville.
Tennessee
US 19W northeast of Ernestville. The highways travel concurrently to Johnson City.
US 321 in Johnson City
US 11E / US 19W in Johnson City.
I-81 in Kingsport
US 11W in Kingsport
Virginia
US 58 / US 421 in Weber City. The highways travel concurrently to Duffield.
Kentucky
US 119 southeast of Jenkins. The highways travel concurrently to Pikeville.
US 460 in Pikeville. The highways travel concurrently to Staffordsville.
I-64 south-southwest of Catlettsburg
US 60 in Catlettsburg. The highways travel concurrently to Ashland.
Ohio
US 52 in Portsmouth
US 50 in Scioto Township
US 35 / US 50 in Scioto Township. The highways travel concurrently through the township.
US 22 in Circleville
I-270 in Hamilton Township
US 33 in Columbus. The highways travel concurrently through the city.
US 62 in Columbus. The highways travel concurrently through the city.
US 40 / US 62 in Columbus
I-670 in Columbus
I-270 in Columbus
US 42 in Delaware. The highways travel concurrently through the city.
US 36 / US 42 in Delaware
US 30 in Crane Township. The highways travel concurrently to Salem Township.
US 224 in Loudon Township.
US 6 on the Montgomery–Scott–Freedom–Madison township line
US 20 on the Troy–Woodville township line. The highways travel concurrently to Perrysburg.
I-75 / US 20 in Perrysburg. I-75/US 23 travel concurrently through the city.
I-475 in Perrysburg. The highways travel concurrently to Sylvania Township.
US 24 in Maumee
US 20 in Sylvania Township
US 223 in Sylvania. The highways travel concurrently to Whiteford Township, Michigan.
Michigan
US 12 in Pittsfield Charter Township
I-94 in Ann Arbor
I-96 in Brighton
I-75 in Mundy Township. The highways travel concurrently to Lincoln Township.
I-69 in Flint Township
I-475 in Mount Morris Township
I-675 in Buena Vista Charter Township
I-675 in Zilwaukee Township
US 10 in Monitor Township
I-75 in Mackinaw City

== See also ==
- U.S. Route 123
- U.S. Route 223
- Special routes of U.S. Route 23

Browse numbered routes
← KY 22	KY	→ KY 28
