= Paintsville, Kentucky =

- City
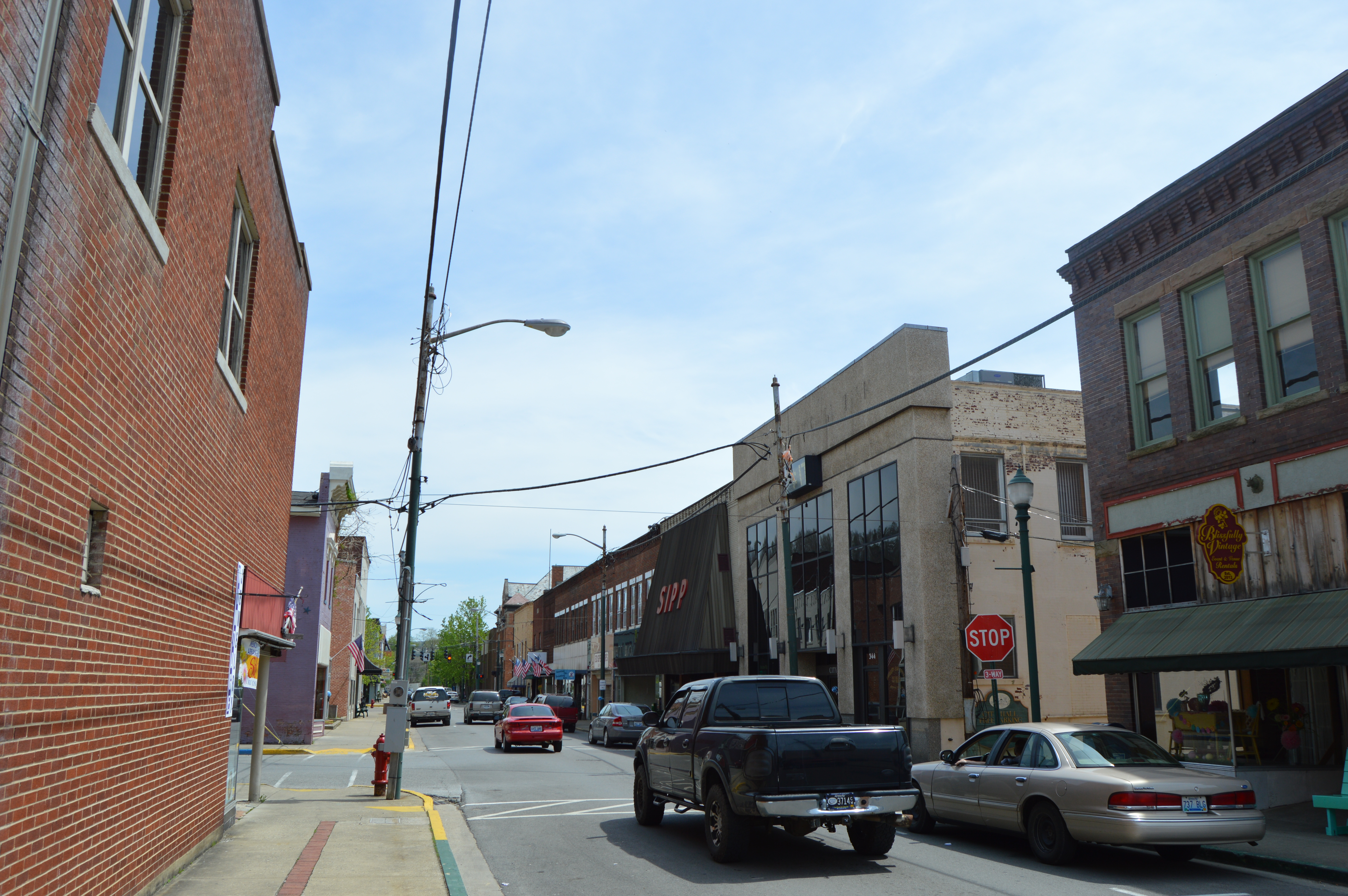
- Looking east on Main Street toward the Court Street intersection in downtown Paintsville
- Nickname: "City Between the Lakes"
- Location of Paintsville in Johnson County, Kentucky

- Location within Kentucky Location within the United States
- Coordinates: 37°48′41″N 82°48′24″W
- Country: United States
- State: Kentucky
- County: Johnson
- Established: February 24, 1834
- Incorporated: February 5, 1843
- Named for: Paint Creek

Government
  - Type: Mayor-Council
  - Mayor: Andrew Preston

Area
  - Total: 6.75 sq mi (17.48 km^{2})
  - Land: 6.62 sq mi (17.14 km^{2})
  - Water: 0.14 sq mi (0.35 km^{2})
- Elevation: 614 ft (187 m)

Population (2020)
  - Total: 4,312
  - Estimate (2024): 4,129
  - Density: 651.7/sq mi (251.64/km^{2})
- Time zone: UTC-5 (Eastern (EST))
  - Summer (DST): UTC-4 (EDT)
- ZIP code: 41240
- Area code: 606
- Website: www.cityofpaintsville.net

Paintsville (locally /ˈpeɪntsvəl/) is a home rule-class city in Johnson County, Kentucky, United States. Located along Paint Creek, it is the county seat of Johnson County. The population was 4,312 at the 2020 census.

== History ==
A Paint Lick Station was referred to in United States Army dispatches as early as 1780. The site was named for tribal art painted on the debarked trees near a local salt lick when the first white settlers arrived and was originally part of a 19,050-acre (7,710 ha) tract belonging to George Lewis. The trading post was purchased by Henery Dixon from North Carolina in 1812 and laid out as the town of Paint Lick Station in 1826. The town was formally established under that name in 1834, although the post office was probably named Paint Creek. It was incorporated as a city under its present name of Paintsville in 1843, the same year it became the county seat of Johnson County.

The Civil War found Johnson County Fiscal Court passing an ordinance barring both Union and Confederate flags from being flown in its jurisdiction. This was quickly repealed when then-Col. James A. Garfield marched his brigade into the city.

During the early twentieth century, Paintsville began to transform into a modern American city. In 1902, the city's first bank – First National – opened for business. In 1906, the city received telephone service and, two years later, all of its streets were paved. In 1912, Paintsville received electricity and natural gas services. In 1926, Paintsville residents received public water and the city's fire department was established. Library services were originally provided through the Pack Horse Library Project.

Since the 1990s, Paintsville has seen a steady loss of population (4,345 in 1990 to 3,459 in 2010), in part due to a downturn in the economy, and the loss of coal jobs. Despite this, there have been some business developments in the past few years, as well as growing tourist interest. Paintsville has been in the process of revitalizing the downtown area to rejuvenate its original business district. On June 9, 2009, Paintsville became a "wet" city for the first time since March 14, 1945, permitting stores located within the city limits to sell alcoholic beverages.

== Geography ==
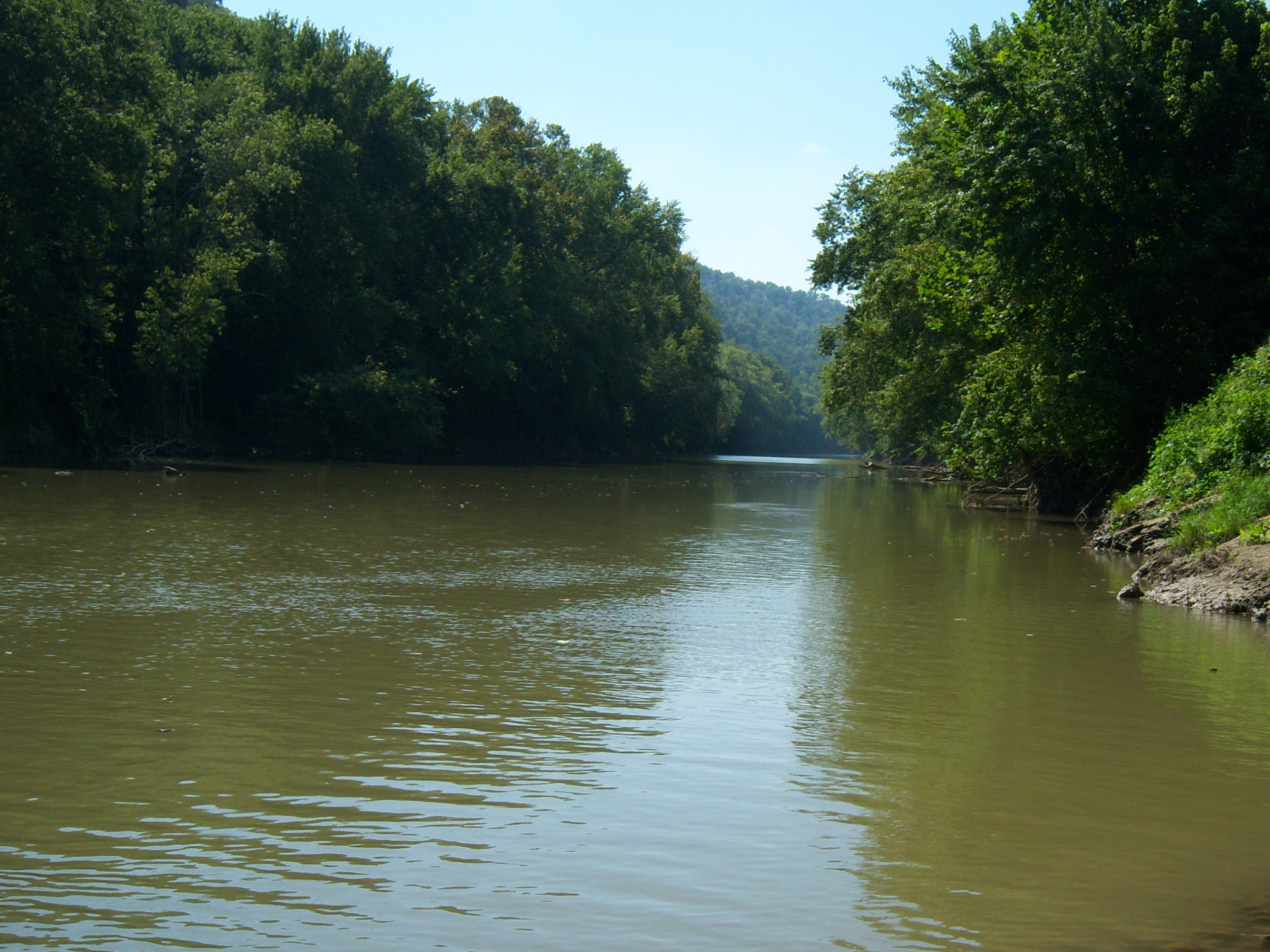
Levisa Fork River in Paintsville

Paintsville is located at 37°48′41″N 82°48′24″W (37.811324, −82.806780) in the bottomland at the confluence of Paint Creek and the Levisa Fork of the Big Sandy River amid the foothills of the Appalachian Mountains in the Cumberland Plateau. According to the United States Census Bureau, the city has a total area of 5.3 square miles (14 km^{2}), all of it land.

=== Climate ===
Paintsville has a humid subtropical climate (Köppen Cfa). Summers are hot and humid with frequent severe storms. July is the warmest month, with an average high 86 °F (30 °C) and an average low of 66 °F (19 °C). Winters are cold with occasional mild periods. January is the coldest month with an average high of 44 °F (7 °C) and an average low of 24 °F (−4 °C). The highest recorded temperature was 105 °F (41 °C) in 1988 and the lowest recorded temperature was −26 °F (−32 °C) in 1994. May has the highest average rainfall (4.54 inches) and October has the lowest average rainfall (2.97 inches).

Climate data for Paintsville, Kentucky (1991–2020 normals, extremes 1972–present)
Month	Jan	Feb	Mar	Apr	May	Jun	Jul	Aug	Sep	Oct	Nov	Dec	Year
Record high °F (°C)	80 (27)	83 (28)	88 (31)	93 (34)	96 (36)	102 (39)	105 (41)	105 (41)	99 (37)	95 (35)	87 (31)	82 (28)	105 (41)
Mean maximum °F (°C)	68.8 (20.4)	73.0 (22.8)	79.8 (26.6)	86.0 (30.0)	88.1 (31.2)	92.2 (33.4)	92.9 (33.8)	92.7 (33.7)	91.1 (32.8)	85.2 (29.6)	78.1 (25.6)	70.0 (21.1)	94.9 (34.9)
Mean daily maximum °F (°C)	44.1 (6.7)	48.7 (9.3)	58.1 (14.5)	69.6 (20.9)	76.2 (24.6)	83.4 (28.6)	86.2 (30.1)	85.7 (29.8)	79.8 (26.6)	69.8 (21.0)	58.4 (14.7)	48.0 (8.9)	67.3 (19.6)
Daily mean °F (°C)	33.5 (0.8)	37.2 (2.9)	44.9 (7.2)	55.1 (12.8)	63.8 (17.7)	71.7 (22.1)	75.4 (24.1)	74.5 (23.6)	67.9 (19.9)	56.5 (13.6)	45.2 (7.3)	37.7 (3.2)	55.3 (12.9)
Mean daily minimum °F (°C)	22.9 (−5.1)	25.6 (−3.6)	31.7 (−0.2)	40.7 (4.8)	51.4 (10.8)	60.1 (15.6)	64.6 (18.1)	63.4 (17.4)	55.9 (13.3)	43.1 (6.2)	32.0 (0.0)	27.5 (−2.5)	43.2 (6.2)
Mean minimum °F (°C)	5.1 (−14.9)	8.7 (−12.9)	16.6 (−8.6)	27.3 (−2.6)	37.8 (3.2)	50.2 (10.1)	56.4 (13.6)	54.8 (12.7)	43.0 (6.1)	30.3 (−0.9)	19.7 (−6.8)	12.1 (−11.1)	2.0 (−16.7)
Record low °F (°C)	−26 (−32)	−17 (−27)	−4 (−20)	20 (−7)	30 (−1)	36 (2)	46 (8)	43 (6)	35 (2)	21 (−6)	12 (−11)	−10 (−23)	−26 (−32)
Average precipitation inches (mm)	3.35 (85)	3.21 (82)	4.41 (112)	3.82 (97)	4.43 (113)	4.79 (122)	5.18 (132)	3.63 (92)	3.35 (85)	3.19 (81)	3.00 (76)	3.83 (97)	46.19 (1,173)
Average precipitation days (≥ 0.01 in)	10.0	9.8	11.4	10.3	11.9	11.2	10.2	8.7	7.6	8.2	7.9	10.7	117.9
Source: NOAA

== Demographics ==
Historical population
Census	Pop.	Note	%±
1870	247		—
1880	310		25.5%
1890	506		63.2%
1900	541		6.9%
1910	942		74.1%
1920	1,383		46.8%
1930	2,411		74.3%
1940	2,324		−3.6%
1950	4,309		85.4%
1960	4,025		−6.6%
1970	3,868		−3.9%
1980	3,815		−1.4%
1990	4,354		14.1%
2000	4,132		−5.1%
2010	3,459		−16.3%
2020	4,312		24.7%
2024 (est.)	4,129		−4.2%
U.S. Decennial Census

=== 2020 census ===
As of the 2020 census, Paintsville had a population of 4,312. The median age was 41.9 years. 19.7% of residents were under the age of 18 and 19.4% of residents were 65 years of age or older. For every 100 females there were 88.2 males, and for every 100 females age 18 and over there were 84.4 males age 18 and over.

90.4% of residents lived in urban areas, while 9.6% lived in rural areas.

There were 1,829 households in Paintsville, of which 28.8% had children under the age of 18 living in them. Of all households, 35.1% were married-couple households, 19.6% were households with a male householder and no spouse or partner present, and 37.9% were households with a female householder and no spouse or partner present. About 37.7% of all households were made up of individuals and 15.5% had someone living alone who was 65 years of age or older.

There were 2,119 housing units, of which 13.7% were vacant. The homeowner vacancy rate was 4.5% and the rental vacancy rate was 11.1%.

Racial composition as of the 2020 census
Race	Number	Percent
White	4,086	94.8%
Black or African American	23	0.5%
American Indian and Alaska Native	5	0.1%
Asian	61	1.4%
Native Hawaiian and Other Pacific Islander	3	0.1%
Some other race	27	0.6%
Two or more races	107	2.5%
Hispanic or Latino (of any race)	65	1.5%

=== 2010 census ===
As of the 2010 census, there were 3,459 people, 1,604 households, and 856 families residing in the city. The population density was 1300.1 people per square mile. There were 1,844 housing units at an average density of 693.2 per square mile. The racial makeup of the city was 99.3% White, 0.3% African American, 0.8% Native American, 0.4% Asian, 0.1% Pacific Islander, and 0.2% from other races. Hispanic or Latino people of any race were 0.4% of the population.

In the city, the population was spread out, with 20.5% under 19, 6.1% from 20 to 24, 11.0% from 25 to 34, 11.9% from 35 to 44, 15.1% from 45 to 54, 14.4% from 55 to 64, and 21.1% who were 65 or older. The median age is 41.9 years. There were 1,574 males and 1,885 females.

=== Income and poverty ===
The median income for a household in the city was $25,259, and the median income for a family was $30,575. Males had a median income of $30,478 versus $25,640 for females. The per capita income for the city was $15,876. About 21.0% of families and 29.4% of the population were below the poverty line, including 39.9% of those under age 18 and 22.0% of those age 65 or over.

=== Crime ===
In 2019, the following crime rate was reported to the Federal Bureau of Investigation by the city police department: per 100,000 people, there were four violent crimes (including one forcible rape and three aggravated assaults), and 31 property crimes (including four burglaries, 18 larceny thefts and nine vehicle thefts). Five people died in a 2018 shooting spree.

== Arts and culture ==
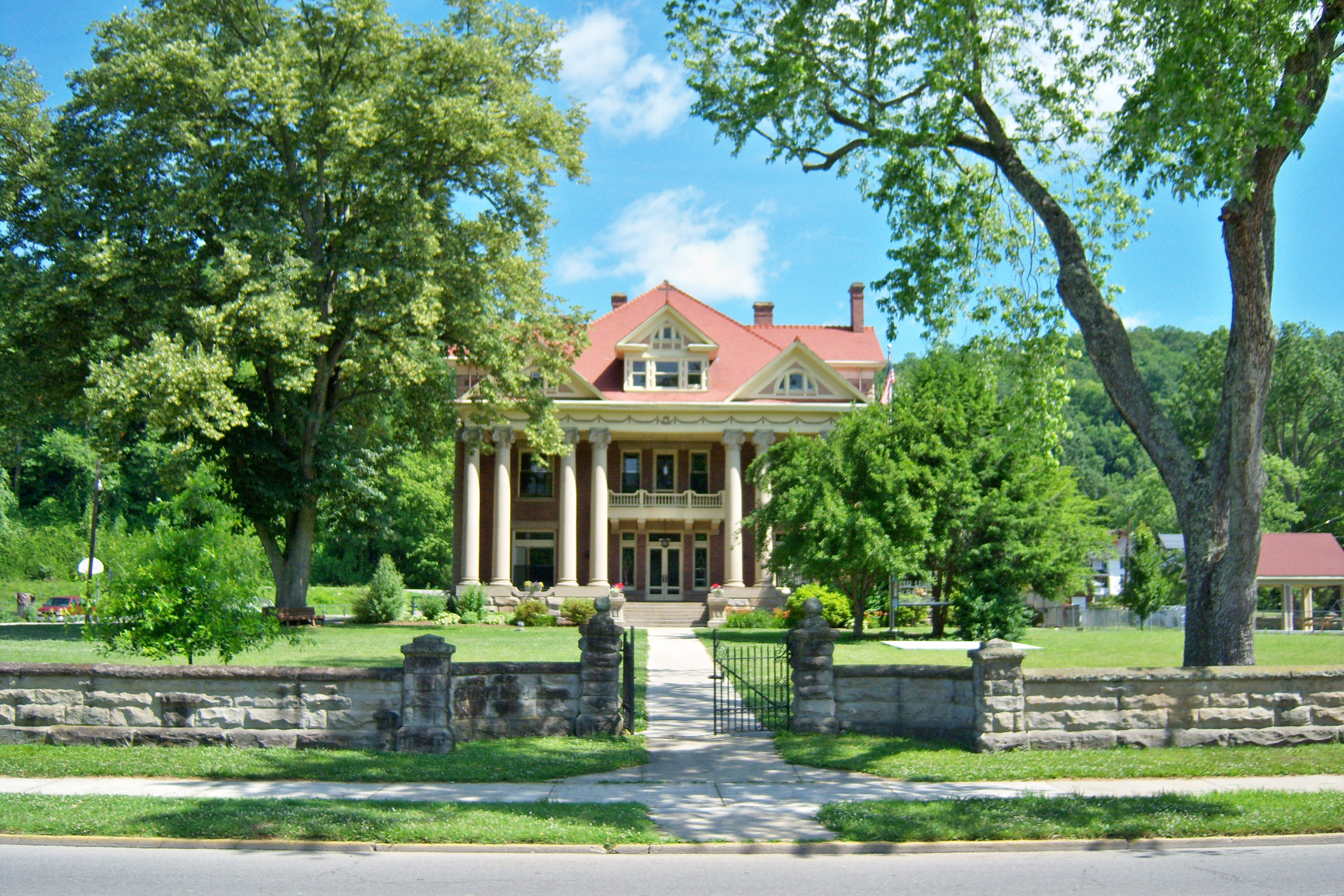
Mayo Mansion

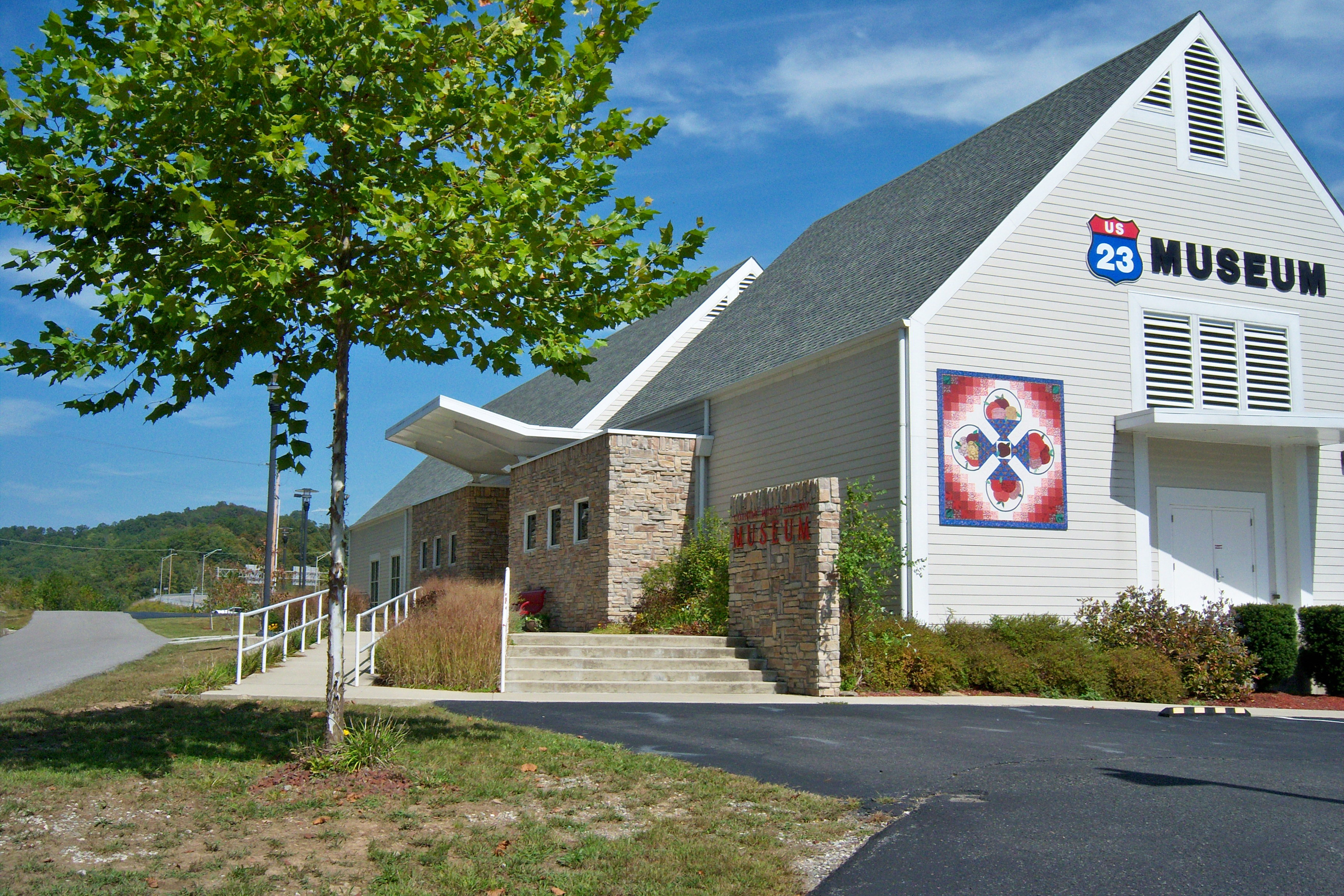
U.S. 23 Country Music Highway Museum

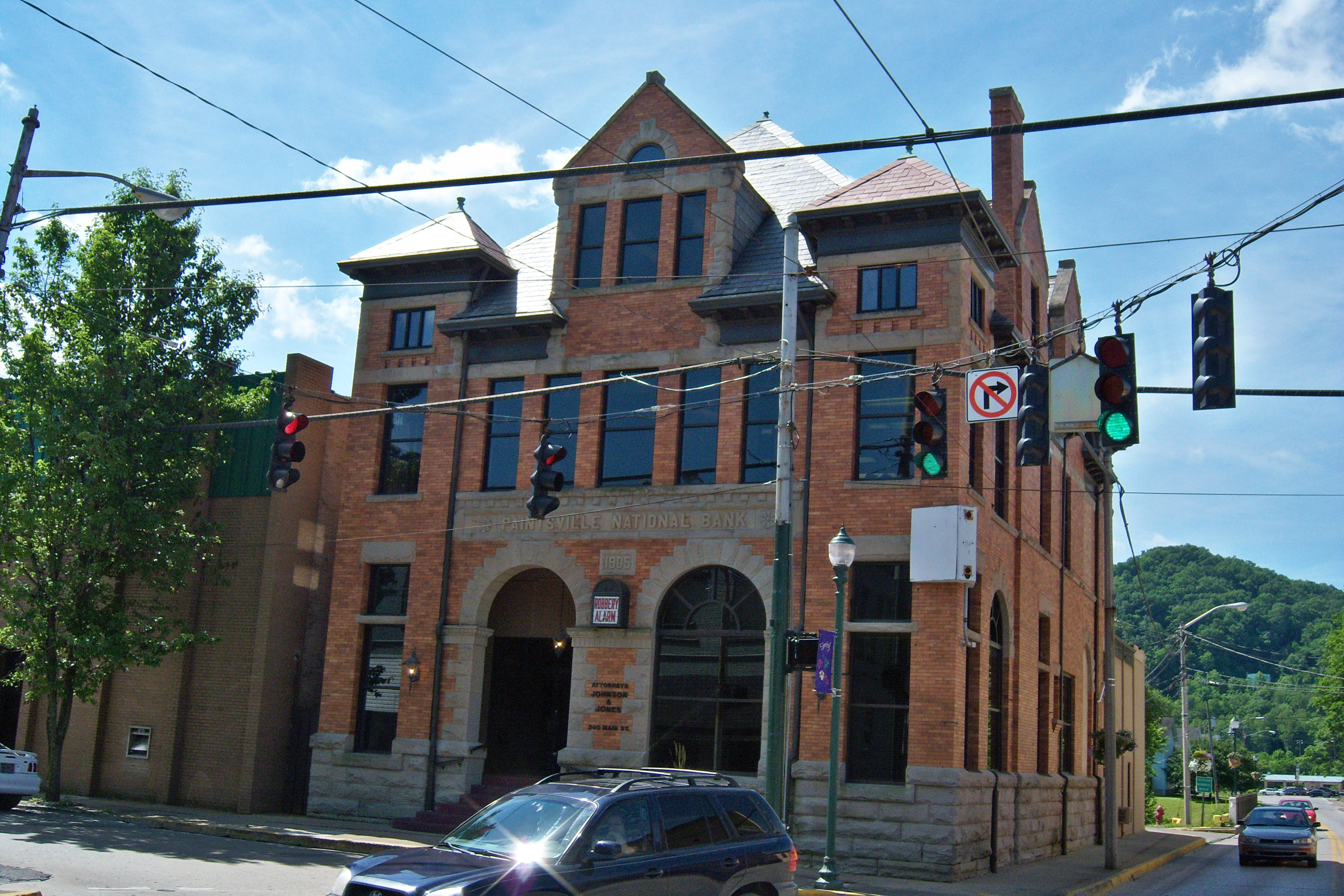
Paintsville First National Bank

=== Festivals ===
The Kentucky Apple Festival has been held in Paintsville annually since 1962. Events include live music, carnival rides, a pageant, various competitions, a parade, and a car show. The festival occurs annually on the first full weekend in October.

The Awaken Conference, an annual Christian concert event attracting thousands of people to the area, is held each July in the city.

Paintsville also holds a Spring Fling on Main Street in May.

=== Museums and historical sites ===
The U.S. 23 County Music Highway Museum gives information on the country music entertainers who grew up near U.S. 23 in Eastern Kentucky. Country music entertainers profiled in the museum include Loretta Lynn, Crystal Gayle, and Hylo Brown.

The historic Mayo Mansion was built for John C. C. Mayo between 1905 and 1912. It now serves as Our Lady of the Mountains School.

The Mayo Memorial United Methodist Church was designed by one hundred Italian masons hired by John C. C. Mayo. It has several stained glass windows and has a pipe organ donated by Andrew Carnegie. The first church service was in the fall of 1909.

The Mountain Homeplace is a living history museum located within Paintsville Lake State Park, in Staffordsville, Kentucky. The museum is a re-creation of a mid-nineteenth-century farming community and includes a blacksmith shop, one-room schoolhouse, church, cabin, and barn with farm grounds. These structures were all moved from nearby locations in the early 1980s to prevent them from being submerged underneath the planned Paintsville Lake. The museum officially opened in July 1995.

Tour guides and park workers wearing traditional period attire demonstrate old skills and crafts such as forging horseshoes, quilting, and tending to farm animals. There is also a Welcome Center, consisting of the Museum of Appalachian History and a gift shop featuring regional arts and crafts.

The In the Pines Amphitheater was built in the early 2000s and was modeled after the amphitheaters of Ancient Greece. The 700-seat facility is open year-round and annually hosts the Red Bud Gospel Sing.

The museum is open from April 1 through December 31.

== Parks and recreation ==
The Paintsville Country Club includes an 18-hole golf course established on September 27, 1929, making it one of the oldest golf courses in Eastern Kentucky. The country club was built in 1930 by the WPA and is on the National Register of Historic Places.

The Paintsville Recreation Center contains a volleyball court, a basketball court, a walking track, and a playground. There is also a small community garden on site.

== Government ==
Paintsville has a mayor–council form of government.

Former mayors:

- Richard C. Thomas (1920–1922)
- Dr. J.C. Sparks (1924)
- James N. Meek (1924–1925)
- Dr. E.E. Archer (1926–1933)
- F.S. Vanhoose (1934–1939)
- J.B. Wells Jr. (1940–1945)
- Escom Chandler (1946–1949)
- J.B. Wells Jr. (1949–1955)
- Ralph B. "Tiny" Preston (1955–1965)
- J.B. Wells Jr. (1966–1969)
- John E. Chandler (1969–1975)
- Jim T. Newman (1975)
- Allen S. Perry (1975)
- James S. Trimble (1975–1985)
- Robert Wiley (1986–1988)
- John David Preston (1988–1993)
- Robin T. Cooper (1994–2002)
- Douglas W. Pugh (2003–2006)
- Bob Porter (2007–2016)

The representative body of the city of Paintsville is the city council. The council members include Roger "Bo" Belcher, Tim Hall, David Vanhoose, Michael Conley, Ashley McKenzie and Eva Holbrook.

=== Departments ===
The city mayor oversees the following departments:

- Community Planning and Zoning Services
- Finance
- Human Resources
- Police
- Public Works
- Parks and Recreation
- Tourism
- Fire/EMS

== Education ==
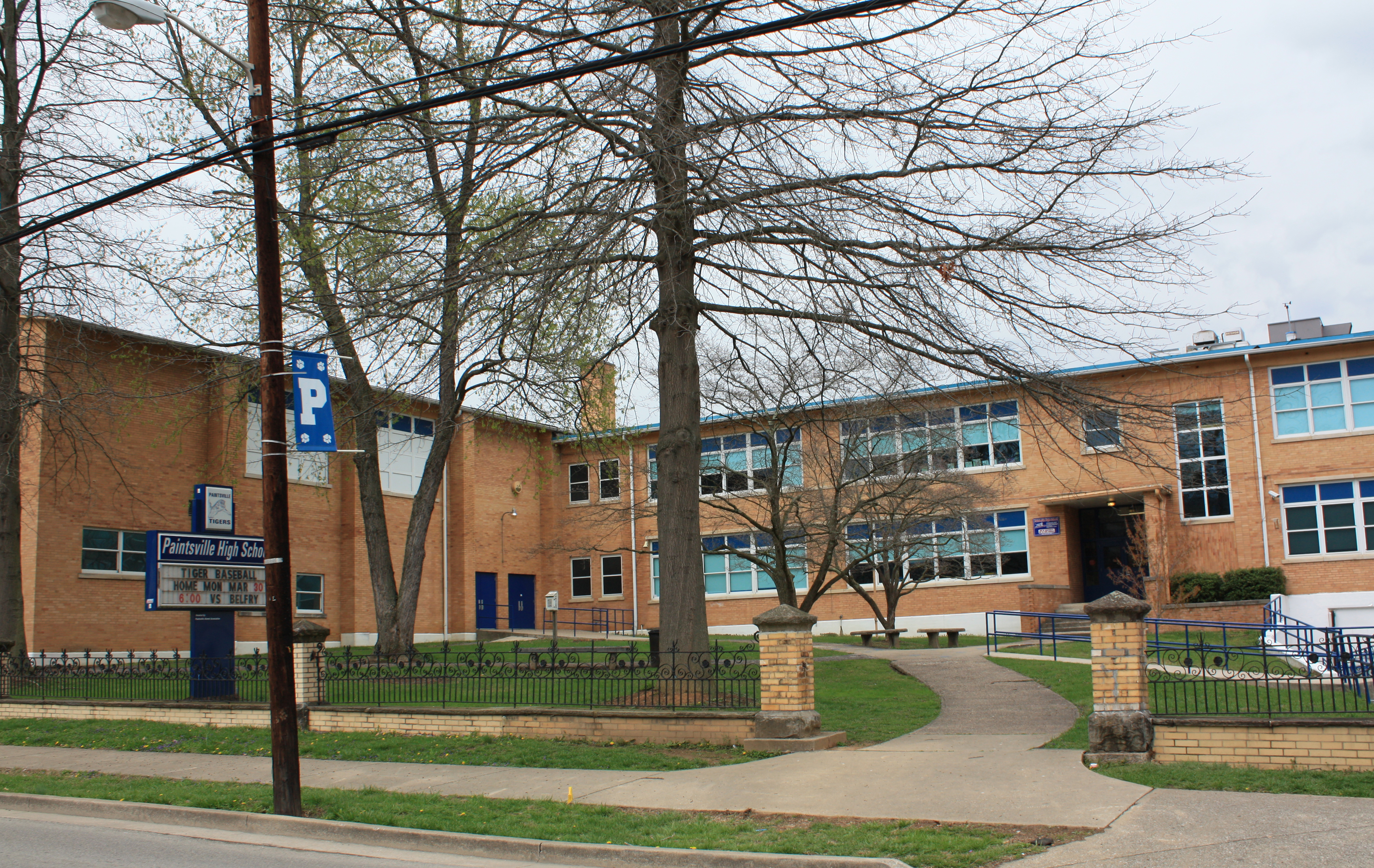
Paintsville High School

The Paintsville Independent School District includes Paintsville High School (7th–12th grades) and Paintsville Elementary School. Paintsville Independent has consistently had college attendance rates between 95% and 100% since 2008. In 2012, the district had a composite ACT score of 22.7. It was the 4th highest composite ACT score out of the 169 school districts in the state of Kentucky.

Johnson County Schools also operates three schools within the city of Paintsville: Johnson Central High School, Johnson County Middle School (Kentucky), and Central Elementary School. Johnson County is also well known for its academics. Johnson Central High School has won five international Future Problem Solving titles while the middle school has won 10 Governor's Cup state titles along with three international FPS titles.

Our Lady of the Mountains School is a private institution operated by the Roman Catholic Bishop of the Diocese of Lexington.

Big Sandy Community and Technical College operates a campus in Paintsville that offers two-year degrees in various fields of study.

Paintsville has a lending library, the Johnson County Public Library.

== Media ==
The Paintsville Herald is a semi-weekly newspaper printed on Wednesday and Friday with a circulation of about 5,200 copies. The newspaper serves Paintsville and the surrounding area.

Call sign	Frequency	Format
WKLW	94.7 FM	Hot AC
WSIP	98.9 FM	Country
WSIP	1490 AM	News/Talk
WKYH	600 AM	News/Talk
WQHY	95.5 FM	Top 40

== Transportation ==
U.S. Route 23 serves as the bypass for Paintsville. The four-lane divided highway links Paintsville to Interstate 64 to the north and U.S. Route 119 and Kentucky Route 80 to the south. U.S. Route 460 links Paintsville to the Mountain Parkway in Salyersville. Kentucky Route 40 forms both Euclid Avenue and Third Street in Paintsville. It links the city to Inez and also serves as an alternative route to Salyersville. Kentucky Route 321, locally known as South Mayo Trail, serves as the city's main business route and passes through Mayo Plaza.

Located southeast of Paintsville in neighboring Martin County is Big Sandy Regional Airport. The publicly owned, private-use airport is used for general aviation. Its main runway is 5,000 ft (1,524 m) long. The nearest airport that provides commercial aviation services is Tri-State Airport, 55 miles (89 km) northeast in Ceredo, West Virginia.

== Healthcare ==
Paintsville ARH Hospital is a full-service hospital providing healthcare to the region. It has a full-service emergency room with a pediatric trauma room, a hyperbaric oxygen chamber, a special birthing room, and full service surgical services, including a daVinci Si robotic system providing state-of-the-art laparoscopic surgery for the greater Paintsville region.

== In popular culture ==
- The majority of the 1983 film Kentucky Woman was filmed in Paintsville.
- Paintsville was one of the three filming locations for the 2010 drama film, Passenger Pigeons.

== Notable people ==
- Willie Blair, pitcher in Major League Baseball 1990–2001
- Tyler Childers, country, bluegrass, and rock musician
- Jim Ford, singer-songwriter; born in Paintsville
- Crystal Gayle, country music singer and recording artist; born in Paintsville in 1951 (Older sister Loretta Lynn was born in nearby Butcher Hollow/Van Lear in 1932)
- Andrew Jackson Kirk, U.S. Representative from Kentucky
- Johnnie LeMaster, Major League Baseball player (San Francisco Giants, Cleveland Indians, Pittsburgh Pirates); resides in Paintsville
- John C. C. Mayo, entrepreneur
- Wendell H. Meade, Republican member of U.S. House of Representatives 1947–49; born in Paintsville
- John Pelphrey, Kentucky "Mr. Basketball" of 1987, one of four University of Kentucky basketball players dubbed "The Unforgettables"; former Arkansas head coach
- Venus Ramey, Miss America 1944; grew up in Paintsville
- Ovie Scurlock, born in Paintsville on November 11, 1918, former jockey in horse racing
- Benjamin F. Stapleton, Mayor of Denver, Colorado 1923–1931 and 1935–1947, born in Paintsville
- Chris Stapleton, country, bluegrass, rock musician signed to Universal Music Group Nashville; attended Johnson Central High School in Paintsville
- Richard Scott Thomas, born in Paintsville on December 3, 1925, dancer, educator, co-founder of New York School of Ballet; father of Richard Earl Thomas, actor best known for role as John-Boy Walton in CBS drama The Waltons

== See also ==
- Paul B. Hall Regional Medical Center
- Citizens National Bank
- U.S. 23 Country Music Highway Museum
- Francis M. Stafford House
- Mountain Homeplace
