= U.S. 23 Country Music Highway Museum =

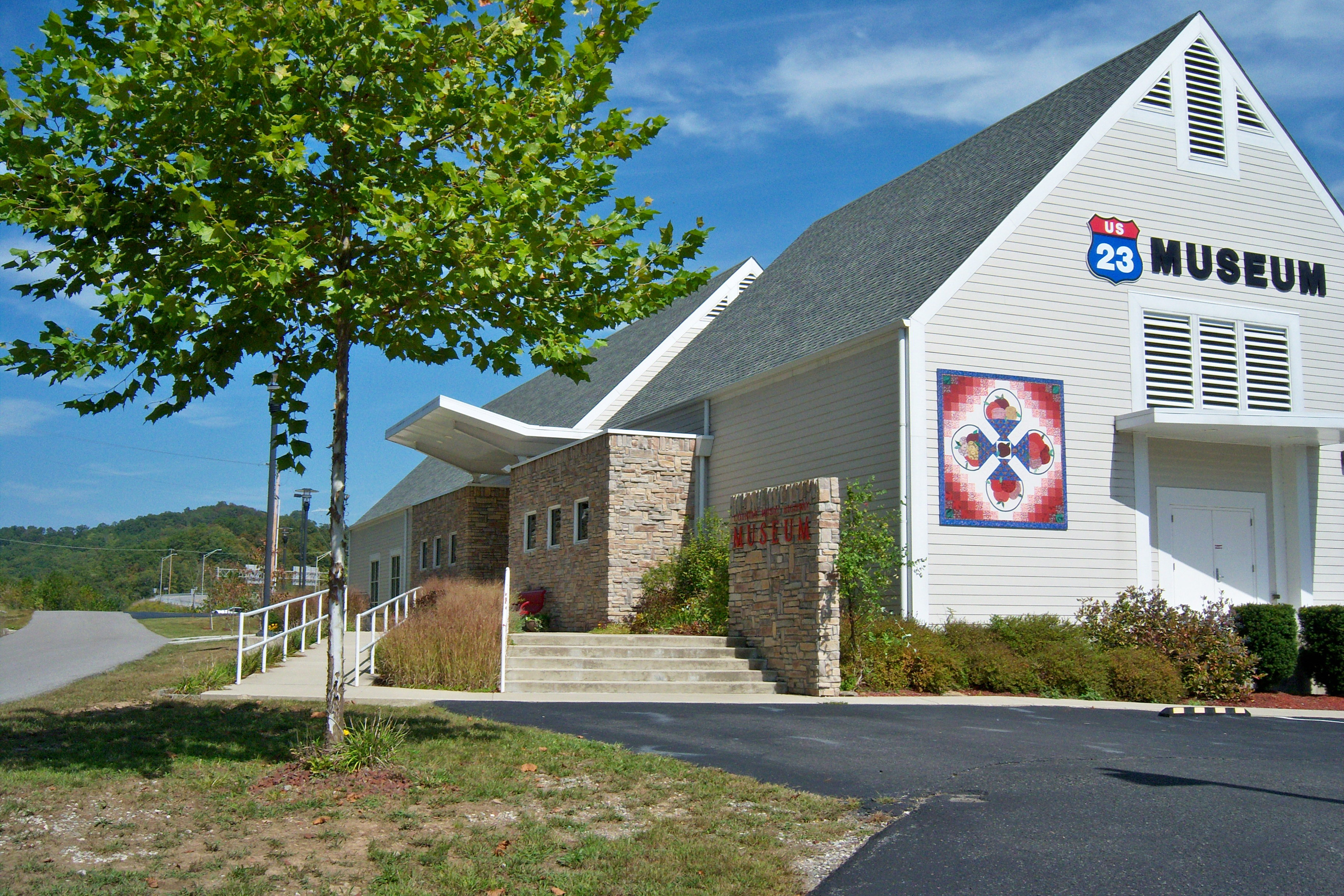
- Established: April 2005
- Location: 120 Staves Branch, Paintsville, Kentucky
- Coordinates: 37.82655°N 82.83751°W
- Type: Local museum
- Website: paintsvilletourism.com/us-23-country-music-highway-museum-2/

The U.S. 23 Country Music Highway Museum is a museum in Paintsville, Kentucky dedicated to the country music entertainers who were born or lived near U.S. Route 23 in eastern Kentucky. Entertainers exhibited within the museum include Billy Ray Cyrus, The Judds, Tom T. Hall, Ricky Skaggs, Hylo Brown, Loretta Lynn, Rebecca Lynn Howard, Keith Whitley, Dwight Yoakam, Patty Loveless, Tyler Childers, Sundy Best, and Gary Stewart. It also has a gift shop and a large conference room that can be reserved for events such as concerts.

== See also ==
- List of music museums
