= Paint Creek (Johnson County, Kentucky) =

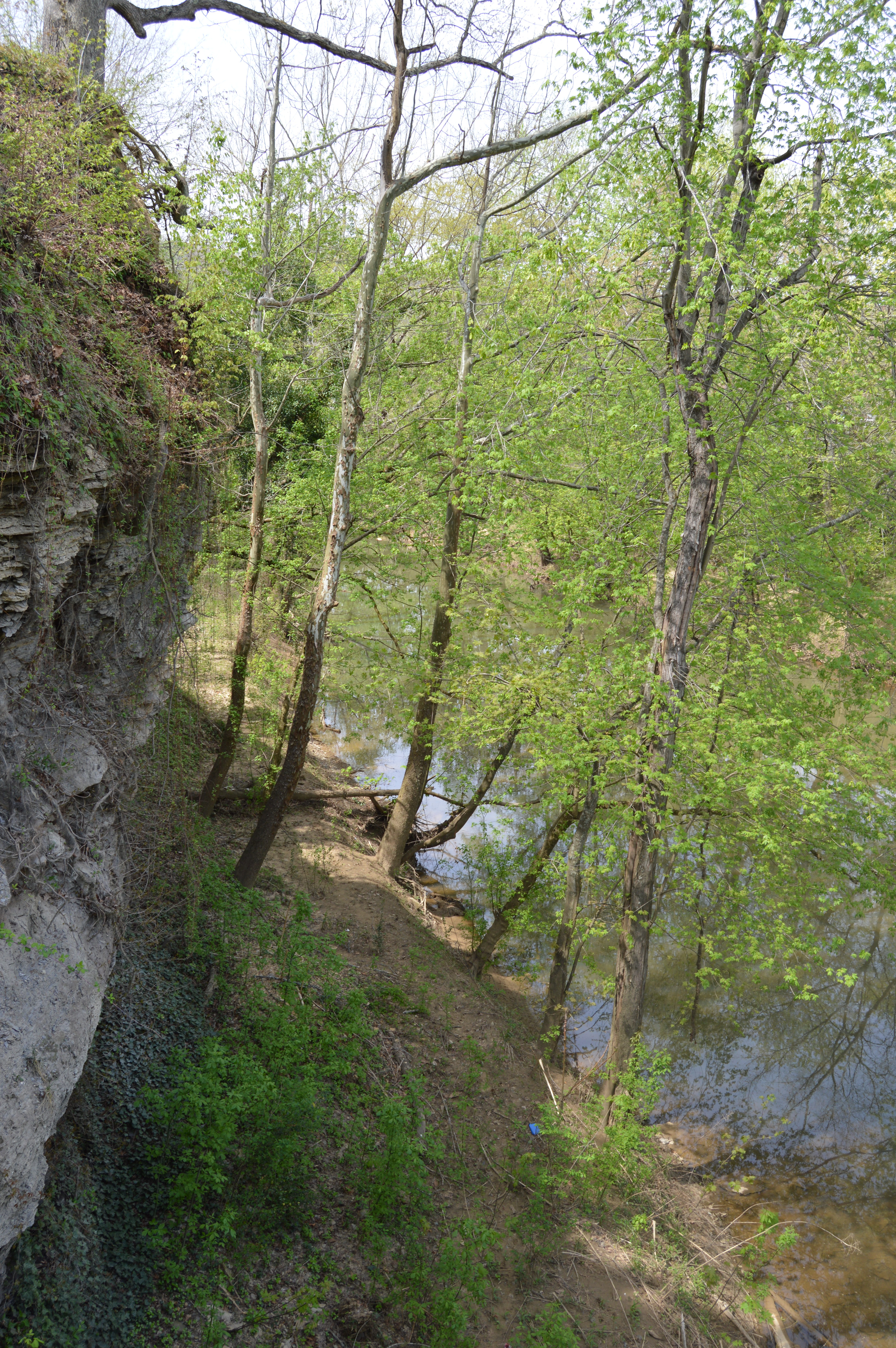
- Cliff along Paint Creek

Location
- Country: United States
- State: Kentucky
- Counties: Johnson County, Kentucky

Physical characteristics
- Source
  - location: Confluence of Open Fork and Little Paint creeks in Johnson County, KY
  - coordinates: 37°53′50″N 82°59′16″W
  - elevation: 702 ft (214 m)
- Mouth: Levisa Fork
  - location: Paintsville, KY
  - coordinates: 37°48′51″N 82°47′31″W
  - elevation: 600 ft (180 m)

Paint Creek is a 20.1-mile-long (32.3 km) tributary of the Levisa Fork in Johnson County, Kentucky. The stream is formed at the confluence of the Little Paint and Open Fork creeks. It is named for the colorful Adena Indian ideographs that were painted on white birch trees and rocks that once lined the stream.

Paint Creek rises in eastern Morgan County, near the community of Crockett, KY; flowing through Moon, KY; and Relief, KY. In 1983, part of Paint Creek was impounded, forming Paintsville Lake. After passing through the Paintsville Lake dam, the stream passes through the city of Paintsville, where it joins the Levisa Fork.

Paint Creek is the only designated trout stream in Johnson County. The water level of the creek is dependent upon rainfall, and can vary from very shallow to deep and rapid depending on recent weather conditions. Fishermen can expect to catch brown trout, rainbow trout, small mouth bass, bream, rock bass, crappie, catfish, white sucker and many other species as well as creek chubs, freshwater mussels and mud eels.

== See also ==
- List of rivers of Kentucky
