= National Register of Historic Places listings in Johnson County, Kentucky =

Location of Johnson County in Kentucky

This is a list of the National Register of Historic Places listings in Johnson County, Kentucky.

This is intended to be a complete list of the properties and districts on the National Register of Historic Places in Johnson County, Kentucky, United States. The locations of National Register properties and districts for which the latitude and longitude coordinates are included below, may be seen in a map.

There are 39 properties and districts listed on the National Register in the county. Another 2 properties were once listed but have been removed.

This National Park Service list is complete through NPS recent listings posted December 12, 2025.

== Current listings ==
	Name on the Register	Image	Date listed	Location	City or town	Description
1	Archer House	Archer House	January 26, 1989 (#88003162)	170 Euclid St. 37°48′54″N 82°47′59″W	Paintsville	
2	Blanton Archeological Site		July 30, 1975 (#75000782)	Address Restricted	Oil Springs	
3	Jeff Bond House		January 26, 1989 (#88003174)	Kentucky Route 172; 37°55′31″N 82°57′22″W	Redbush	
4	Dameron Shelter Archeological Site		August 1, 1975 (#75000784)	Address Restricted	Paintsville	
5	Daniel Davis House		October 9, 1974 (#74000886)	Northwest of Paintsville on U.S. Route 460; 37°49′21″N 82°50′05″W	Paintsville	
6	First Baptist Church	First Baptist Church	January 26, 1989 (#88003165)	College St. 37°49′00″N 82°48′23″W	Paintsville	
7	First Methodist Church	First Methodist Church	January 26, 1989 (#88003155)	Main and Church Sts. 37°48′50″N 82°48′31″W	Paintsville	
8	First National Bank Building	First National Bank Building	January 26, 1989 (#88003154)	Main and College Sts. 37°48′49″N 82°48′20″W	Paintsville	
9	Flat Gap School		January 26, 1989 (#88003187)	Kentucky Route 689 near the junction with Kentucky Route 1092; 37°56′11″N 82°53′15″W	Flat Gap	
10	Foster Hardware	Foster Hardware	January 26, 1989 (#88003156)	Main and Court Sts. 37°48′49″N 82°48′26″W	Paintsville	
11	John J. and Ellen Lemaster House		January 26, 1989 (#88003177)	0.6 miles northeast of Low Gap on Low Gap Fork; 37°52′11″N 82°56′26″W	Low Gap	
12	Mayo Methodist Church	Mayo Methodist Church	January 26, 1989 (#88003152)	3rd St. 37°48′58″N 82°48′26″W	Paintsville	
13	John C. C. Mayo Mansion and Office	John C. C. Mayo Mansion and Office	May 3, 1974 (#74000887)	405 3rd St. 37°48′59″N 82°48′29″W	Paintsville	
14	Thomas Mayo House	Thomas Mayo House	January 26, 1989 (#88003166)	228 2nd St. 37°48′54″N 82°48′35″W	Paintsville	
15	David McKenzie Log Cabin	David McKenzie Log Cabin	August 26, 1982 (#82002728)	McKenzie Branch; 37°52′56″N 82°54′44″W	Volga	
16	Meade Memorial Gymnasium	Meade Memorial Gymnasium	January 26, 1989 (#88003170)	Junction of Kentucky Routes 40 and 2040; 37°50′11″N 82°43′19″W	Williamsport	
17	Mine No. 5 Store	Mine No. 5 Store	January 26, 1989 (#88003172)	Kentucky Route 302; 37°46′22″N 82°43′41″W	Van Lear	
18	Ben Mollett Cabin		January 26, 1989 (#88003171)	Off Kentucky Route 40 at Pigeon Roost Fork of Greasy Creek; 37°48′09″N 82°42′19″W	Williamsport	
19	Lloyd Hamilton Mott House		January 26, 1989 (#88003175)	Kentucky Route 172; 37°56′26″N 82°57′06″W	Redbush	
20	Oil Springs High School Gymnasium		January 26, 1989 (#88003178)	Kentucky Route 580 off Kentucky Route 40; 37°48′40″N 82°56′37″W	Oil Springs	
21	Oil Springs Methodist Church		January 26, 1989 (#88003179)	Junction of Kentucky Route 580 and Kentucky Route 40; 37°48′37″N 82°56′35″W	Oil Springs	
22	Paintsville City Hall	Paintsville City Hall	January 26, 1989 (#88003158)	Main St. and spur of Kentucky Route 40; 37°48′55″N 82°48′09″W	Paintsville	
23	Paintsville Country Club	Paintsville Country Club	January 26, 1989 (#88003168)	Kentucky Route 1107 at Davis Branch; 37°48′18″N 82°46′35″W	Paintsville	
24	Paintsville High School		January 26, 1989 (#88003163)	2nd St. 37°48′55″N 82°48′24″W	Paintsville	Formerly on the site of the current elementary school.
25	Paintsville Public Library	Paintsville Public Library	January 26, 1989 (#88003164)	2nd St. 37°48′55″N 82°48′22″W	Paintsville	
26	Patterson House	Patterson House	January 26, 1989 (#88003167)	West and 2nd St. 37°48′53″N 82°48′40″W	Paintsville	
27	H.B. Rice Insurance Building	H.B. Rice Insurance Building	January 26, 1989 (#88003157)	Court and Main Sts. 37°48′50″N 82°48′25″W	Paintsville	
28	Wiley Rice House		January 26, 1989 (#88003180)	Kentucky Route 825 at Asa Creek; 37°45′35″N 82°52′40″W	Asa	
29	Salyer House		January 26, 1989 (#88003181)	Off Kentucky Route 825 at Asa Creek; 37°46′11″N 82°55′04″W	Asa	
30	Addison Salyer House		January 26, 1989 (#88003169)	Off Kentucky Route 825 at Middle Fork of Jenny's Creek; 37°45′50″N 82°50′43″W	Paintsville	
31	Sparks Shelter Archeological Site		July 30, 1975 (#75000783)	Address Restricted	Oil Springs	
32	Francis M. Stafford House	Francis M. Stafford House	October 29, 1975 (#75000785)	102 Broadway; 37°48′45″N 82°48′21″W	Paintsville	
33	Stambaugh Church of Christ		January 26, 1989 (#88003182)	Kentucky Route 1559 at Frog Ornery Branch; 37°53′25″N 82°48′26″W	Stambaugh	
34	Stambaugh House		January 26, 1989 (#88003183)	Kentucky Route 1559 at Van Hoose Branch; 37°53′28″N 82°49′11″W	Stambaugh	
35	Judge Jim Turner House	Judge Jim Turner House	January 26, 1989 (#88003153)	315 3rd St. 37°48′56″N 82°48′31″W	Paintsville	
36	Webb House	Webb House	January 26, 1989 (#88003160)	139 Main St. 37°48′52″N 82°48′08″W	Paintsville	
37	Byrd and Leona Webb House	Byrd and Leona Webb House	January 26, 1989 (#88003159)	137 Main St. 37°48′52″N 82°48′09″W	Paintsville	
38	Tobe Wiley House	Tobe Wiley House	January 26, 1989 (#88003161)	141 Euclid St. 37°48′52″N 82°48′07″W	Paintsville	
39	Williams House		January 26, 1989 (#88003173)	Kentucky Route 689/Elna Rd. 37°55′17″N 82°57′25″W	Redbush	

== Former listings ==
	Name on the Register	Image	Date listed	Date removed	Location	City or town	Description
1	Thomas Akers House		January 26, 1989 (#88003151)	June 14, 1989	374 Fifth	Paintsville	
2	John Davis House		January 26, 1989 (#88003176)	June 14, 1989	Off Davis Branch Rd.	Oil Springs	

== See also ==
- List of National Historic Landmarks in Kentucky
- National Register of Historic Places listings in Kentucky
