= David McKenzie Log Cabin =

Historic house in Kentucky, United States

- U.S. National Register of Historic Places
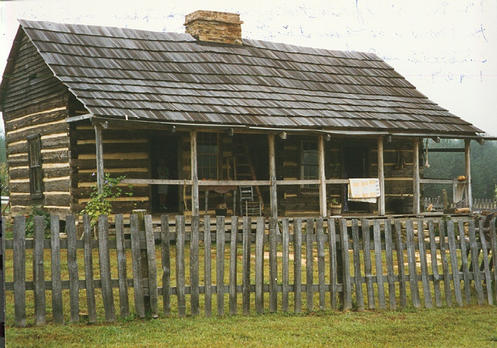

- Location within Kentucky Location within the United States
- Location: Staffordsville, Kentucky, United States
- Coordinates: 37°52′56″N 82°54′44″W
- Built: ca. 1860–1865
- Architect: David McKenzie
- NRHP reference No.: 82002728
- Added to NRHP: January 26, 1982

The David McKenzie Log Cabin is a historic house located within the Mountain Homeplace in Staffordsville, Kentucky, United States. The cabin was built between 1860 and 1865 by David McKenzie, who was an early settler of Johnson County. It was originally located at 37°52′56″N 82°54′44″W, in Volga but was moved to the Mountain Homeplace in the early 1990s by the United States Army Corps of Engineers. It was added to the National Register of Historic Places on January 26, 1982.

The cabin is a double-pen, 1 1/2-story cabin measuring approximately 34.6 by 30.4 feet (10.5 by 9.3 m). It is not known if the structure was originally a double-pen structure as it is today or whether the eastern pen, constructed of poplar, was built first followed by the addition of the western pen, which is of yellow pine. The walls are built of hewn logs with dovetail notching. The cabin rests on sandstone piers and contains a central fireplace, which is also made of sandstone.

== See also ==
- National Register of Historic Places listings in Johnson County, Kentucky
- Mountain Homeplace
