= Benjamin F. Jonas =

American politician (1834–1911)

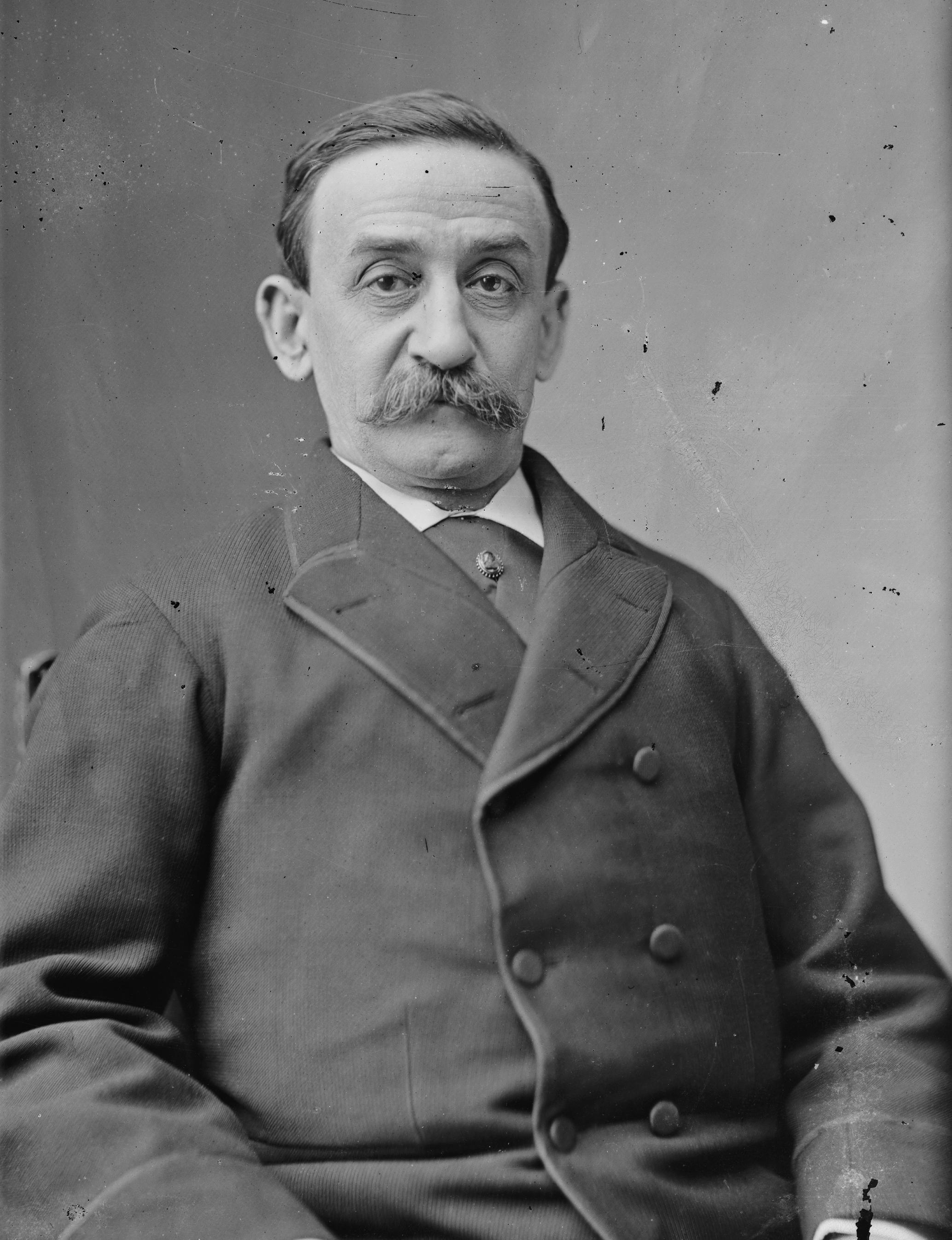

United States Senator from Louisiana
- In office March 4, 1879 – March 4, 1885
- Preceded by: James B. Eustis
- Succeeded by: James B. Eustis

Member of the Louisiana House of Representatives
- In office 1865–1868; 1876–1879

Personal details
- Born: Benjamin Franklin Jonas; July 19, 1834 Williamsport, Kentucky, U.S.
- Died: December 21, 1911 (aged 77) New Orleans, Louisiana, U.S.
- Party: Democratic

Military service
- Allegiance: Confederate States of America
- Branch/service: Confederate States Army
- Years of service: 1862–1865
- Rank: Major
- Battles/wars: American Civil War

Benjamin Franklin Jonas (July 19, 1834 – December 21, 1911) was an American politician who was a Democratic U.S. senator from Louisiana and an officer in the Confederate States Army during the American Civil War. He was the third Jew to serve in the Senate. Jonas was also the last Jewish senator from the Deep South until Jon Ossoff won his seat in Georgia in 2021.

== Life and career ==
He was born in Williamsport, Grant County, Kentucky, to Abraham Jonas (1801–1864), a merchant and lawyer, and Louisa Block. As a boy, he moved with his parents to Quincy, Illinois, where his father became a Republican state legislator and postmaster, and was acquainted with Abraham Lincoln. (In 1864, Lincoln appointed the widowed Mrs. Jonas postmaster in succession to her late husband.)

Benjamin attended the public schools in Quincy. In 1853, he moved to New Orleans, Louisiana; his maternal uncle, Abraham Block, was well known there, being an important figure in the nearby Red River settlements. He studied law at the University of Louisiana (now Tulane University). In 1855, he graduated, was admitted to the bar, and commenced practice in New Orleans.

Despite his family's strong Republican connections, Benjamin Jonas cast his lot with the South in the Civil War. In 1862 he enlisted in the Confederate States Army. He was a member of Fenner's Battery, and adjutant of a battalion of artillery in Hood's Corps in the Army of Tennessee. He served till the end of the war, rising to the rank of major.

After the war, he returned to New Orleans and became active in state politics as a Democrat. In 1865, he was elected to the state House of Representatives, and served until 1868.

In 1872, he was elected to the State Senate, but declined to take the seat. In 1875, he was appointed city attorney of New Orleans, and served until 1879. He was again elected state representative in 1876.

In 1879, he was elected to the U.S. Senate, and served from March 4, 1879 to March 4, 1885. In the 46th Congress, he was chairman of the Committee on Interior and Insular Affairs. He sought another term in 1884, but was not re-elected.

In 1885, he was appointed Collector of the port of New Orleans, serving until 1889. He then resumed the practice of law.

Jonas died in New Orleans on December 21, 1911, and was buried in Dispersed of Judah Cemetery (listed in Historic Cemeteries of New Orleans).

He was the second Jewish U.S. senator from Louisiana, the first having been Judah P. Benjamin (1853–1861), and the third Jewish senator overall, the others being Benjamin and David Levy Yulee of Florida (1845–1851, 1855–1861). However, both Yulee and Benjamin married Christian wives, and did not openly practice Judaism afterward. Jonas was the first practicing Jew in the Senate. Jonas was also the first Ashkenazi Jew in the Senate; while the two previous Jewish senators were of Sephardic descent, as were the majority of U.S. Jews at the time. He was a member of The Boston Club of New Orleans.

== See also ==
- List of Jewish members of the United States Congress

== Sources ==
- Biographical Directory of the U.S. Congress
- Rechcigl, Miloslav Jr. "Early Jewish Immigrants in America From the Czech Historic Lands and Slovakia". JewishGen.

U.S. Senate
Preceded by James B. Eustis	U.S. senator (Class 3) from Louisiana; 1879–1885; Served alongside: William P. Kellogg, Randall L. Gibson	Succeeded by James B. Eustis
