= Mountain Homeplace =

History museum in Kentucky, U.S.

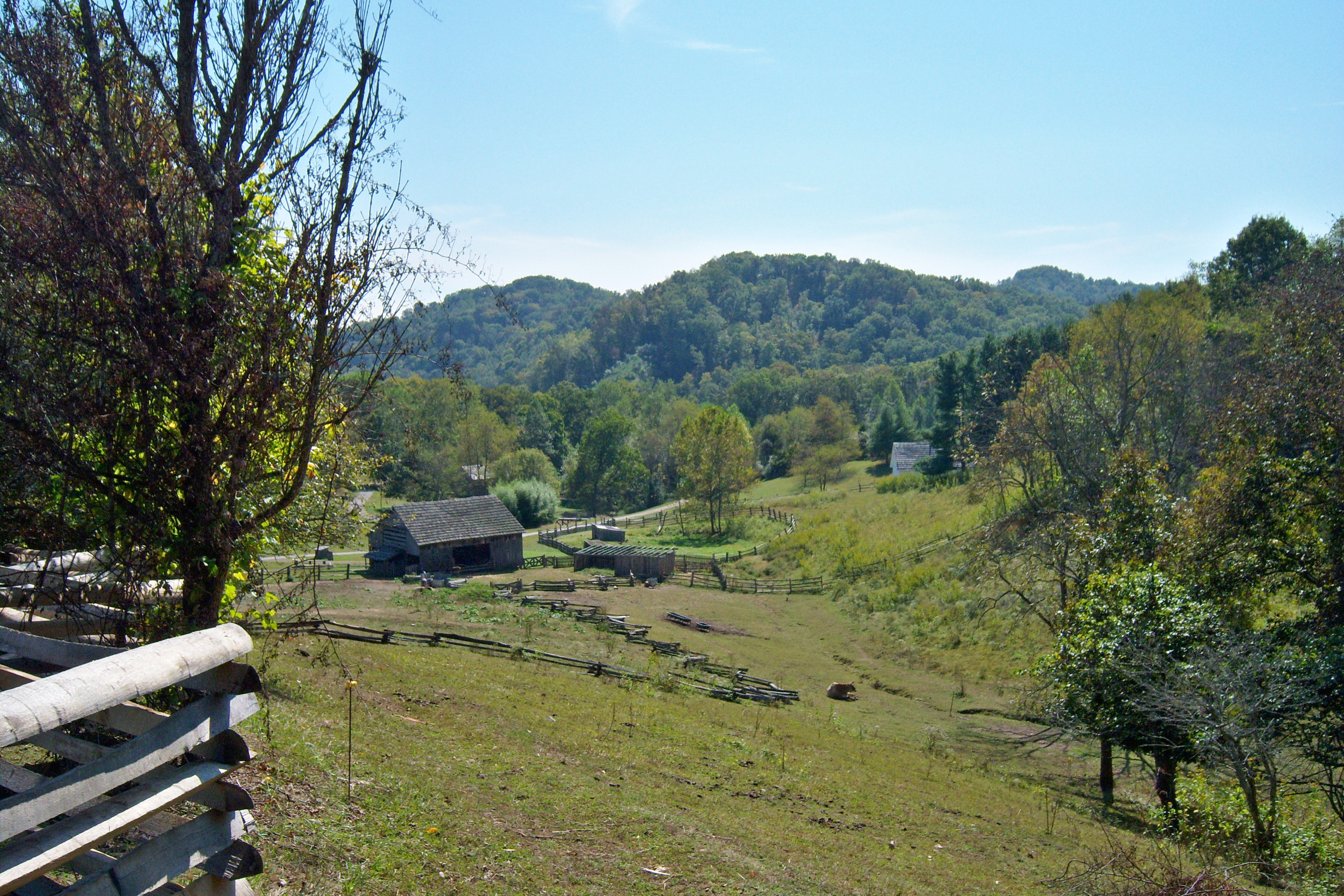

- Location within Kentucky Location within the United States
- Established: July 1995
- Location: 445 Kentucky Route 172, Staffordsville, Kentucky
- Coordinates: 37.837971°N 82.874165°W
- Type: Living history
- Director: Cassy Preston
- Website: Official website

The Mountain Homeplace (also known as the Mountain HomePlace) is a living history museum located within Paintsville Lake State Park, in Staffordsville, Kentucky. The museum is a re-creation of a mid-nineteenth-century farming community and includes a blacksmith shop, one-room schoolhouse, church, cabin, and barn with farm grounds. These structures were all moved from nearby locations in the early 1980s to prevent them from being submerged underneath the planned Paintsville Lake. The museum officially opened in July 1995.

Tour guides and park workers wearing traditional period attire demonstrate old skills and crafts such as forging horseshoes, quilting, and tending to farm animals. There is also a Welcome Center, consisting of the Museum of Appalachian History and a gift shop featuring regional arts and crafts.

The In the Pines Amphitheater was built in the early 2000s and was modeled after the amphitheaters of Ancient Greece. The 700-seat facility is open year-round and annually hosts the Red Bud Gospel Sing.

The museum is open from April 1 through December 20.

== See also ==
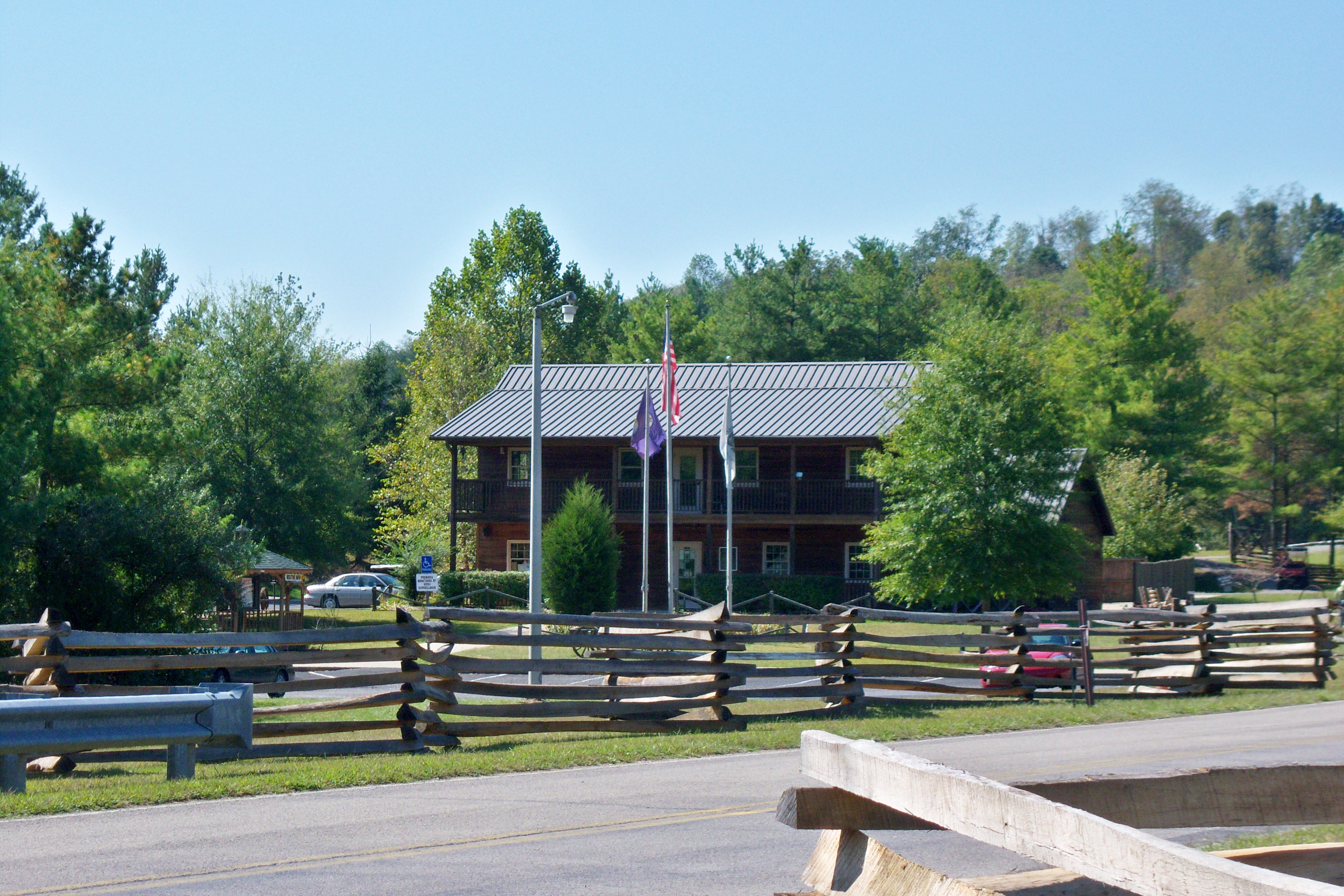
Welcome Center

- David McKenzie Log Cabin
