= First United Methodist Church (Paintsville, Kentucky) =

Historic church in Kentucky, United States

- First Methodist Church
- U.S. National Register of Historic Places
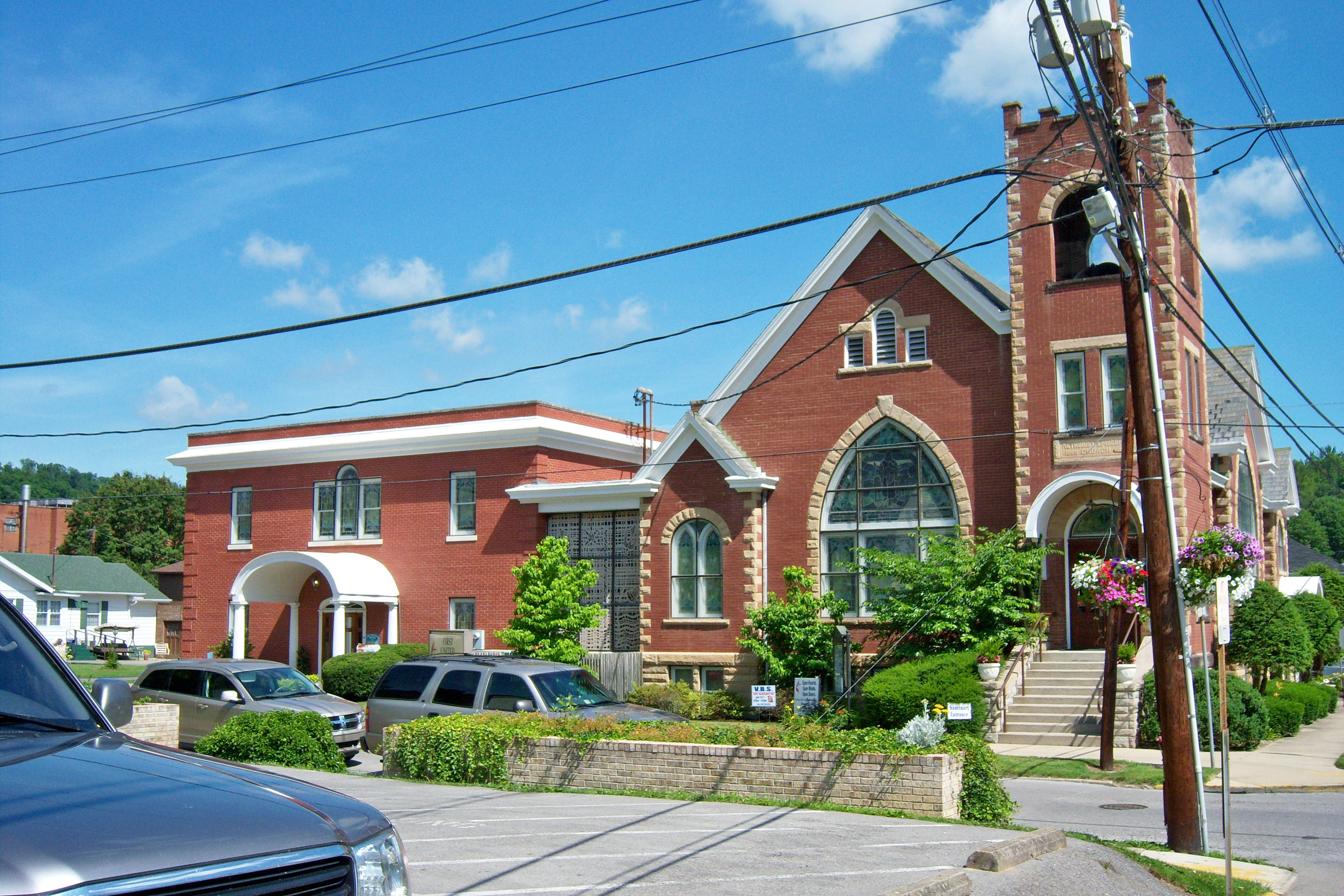

- Location within Kentucky Location within the United States
- Location: 505 Main St., Paintsville, Kentucky
- Coordinates: 37°48′49″N 82°48′33″W
- Area: 0.2 acres (0.081 ha)
- Built: 1914
- Architectural style: Late Gothic Revival
- MPS: Johnson County MRA
- NRHP reference No.: 88003155
- Added to NRHP: January 26, 1989

First United Methodist Church is a historic church located at 505 Main St., Paintsville, Kentucky, United States. In 1989, the church was added to the National Register of Historic Places.

The congregation was established in 1865. The congregation constructed a wood-frame building at the corner of Church St. and Main St. This building fulfilled the congregation's needs until 1914, when the current building was constructed at the same location.

The current building was originally constructed at a cost of a mere $16,000. The most recent addition is a Family Life Center with gym and commercial kitchen and was completed in 2004 at a cost of approximately $1,200,000.00. The church is growing and offers three primary worship services: Sunday Morning 8:30 Traditional, Sunday Morning 10:45 Blended, and Sunday Evening "607" contemporary.

== See also ==
- National Register of Historic Places listings in Johnson County, Kentucky
