= Staffordsville, Kentucky =

Unincorporated community in Kentucky, United States

- Unincorporated community
- Location within Kentucky Location within the United States
- Coordinates: 37°49′47″N 82°50′32″W
- Country: United States
- State: Kentucky
- County: Johnson
- Elevation: 669 ft (204 m)

Population (2000)
  - Total: 2,403
- Time zone: UTC-5 (Eastern (EST))
  - Summer (DST): UTC-4 (EDT)
- ZIP codes: 41256
- GNIS feature ID: 504227

Staffordsville is an unincorporated community in Johnson County, Kentucky, United States. The community was originally named Frew and the first post office was established on July 14, 1882, with Millard F. Rule as postmaster but in 1893, postmistress Jessie Stafford changed the post office's name to "Staffordsville" in order to honor her family. Staffordsville's ZIP code is 41256.

== Geography ==
Staffordsville has an elevation of 669 feet.

== Demographics ==
As of the census of 2000, there were 2,403 people, 938 households, and 745 families residing in the ZIP Code Tabulation Area (ZCTA). The racial makeup of the ZCTA was 98.7% White, 0.0% African American 0.1% Native American, and 0.7% Asian.

There were 938 households, out of which 35.1% had children under the age of 18, 65.1% were married couples living together, 10.6% had a female householder with no husband present, and 20.6% were non-families. 19.0% of all households were made up of individuals, and 18.8% had someone living alone who was 65 years of age or older. The average household size was 2.56 and the average family size was 2.90.

The median income for a household in the ZCTA was $30,865, and the median income for a family was $34,878. Males had a median income of $26,938 versus $21,250 for females. The per capita income was $17,954. About 14.6% of the families in the ZCTA were below the poverty line.

Staffordsville is the hometown of country singer Chris Stapleton.

== Education ==
Most students living in Staffordsville attend:

- Highland Elementary School (kindergarten-sixth grade)
- Johnson County Middle School in Paintsville (seventh-eighth grade)
- Johnson Central High School in Paintsville (ninth-twelfth grade)

== Attractions ==
- Paintsville Lake State Park
- Mountain Homeplace
