= Foster Hardware =

- Foster Hardware Building
- U.S. National Register of Historic Places
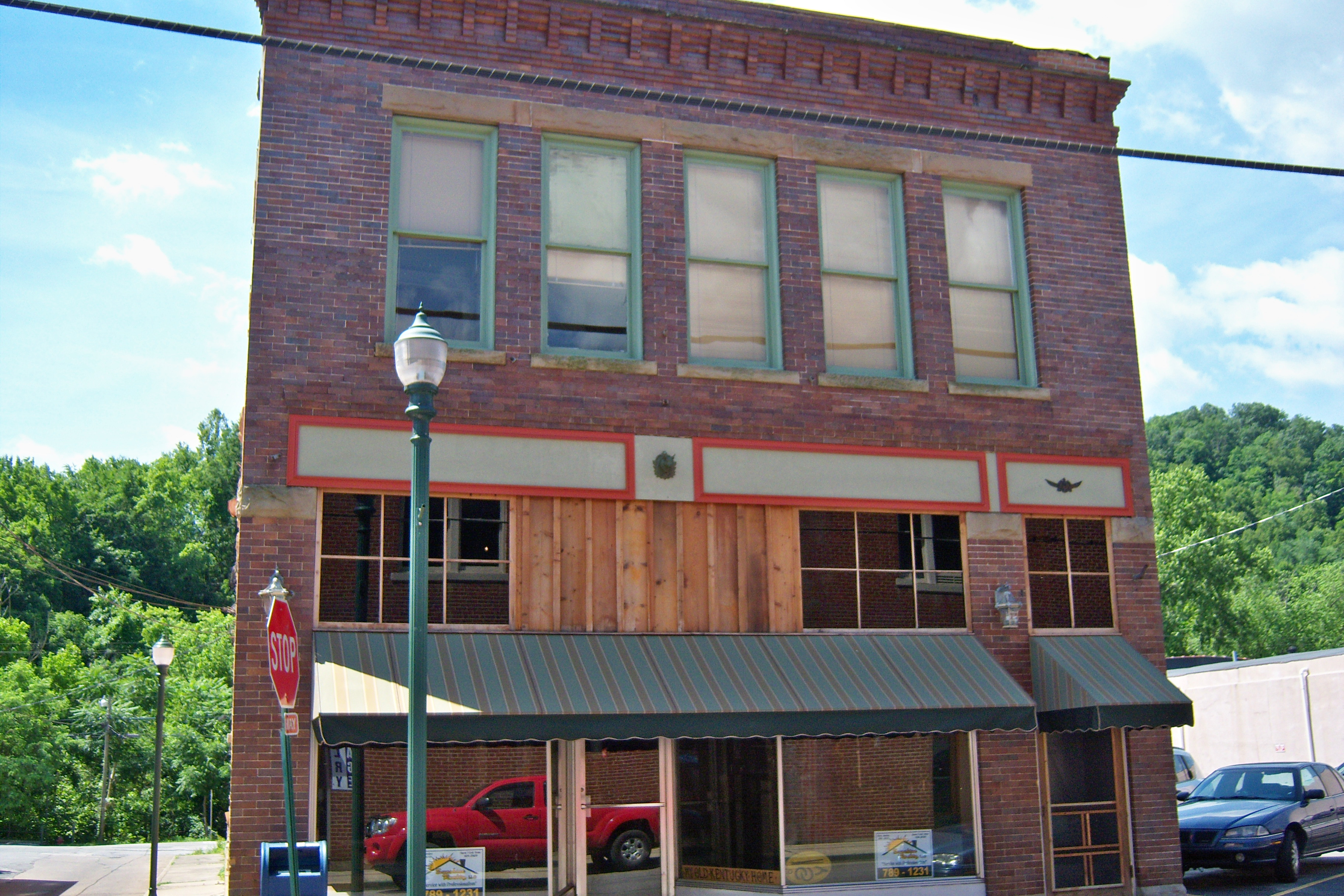

- Location within Kentucky Location within the United States
- Location: 404 Main St., Paintsville, Kentucky, United States
- Coordinates: 37°46′47″N 82°43′27″W
- Area: .13 acres (0.053 ha)
- Built: 1904
- Architectural style: Classical Revival
- NRHP reference No.: 88003156
- Added to NRHP: January 26, 1989

The Foster Hardware Building (also known as the Terry Office Supply Building) is a historic building located in Paintsville, Kentucky, United States. The building was constructed in 1904 by the Foster Hardware Company, which was the antecedent firm to former local wholesale firm, Big Sandy Hardware. On August 29, 2018, the rear portion of the building suffered severe structural damage, when the outer walls collapsed.

== See also ==
- National Register of Historic Places listings in Johnson County, Kentucky
