= Stambaugh Church of Christ =

Historic church in Kentucky, United States

- U.S. National Register of Historic Places
- Location within Kentucky Location within the United States
- Location: KY 1559 at Frog Ornery Branch, Stambaugh, Kentucky
- Coordinates: 37°53′25″N 82°48′26″W
- Area: 0.1 acres (0.040 ha)
- Built: c.1887
- Architect: Stambaugh, Troy; Akers, Jim
- MPS: Johnson County MRA
- NRHP reference No.: 88003182
- Added to NRHP: January 26, 1989

The Stambaugh Church of Christ is a historic church on KY 1559 at Frog Ornery Branch in Stambaugh, Kentucky. It was built c. 1887 and added to the National Register of Historic Places in 1989.

It has also been known as the Fraghonery Church. It was built by hand of hewn logs on property purchased for $10.00 in 1886. It was later covered with dressed, hand-hewn wood.
