= Paintsville City Hall =

- U.S. National Register of Historic Places
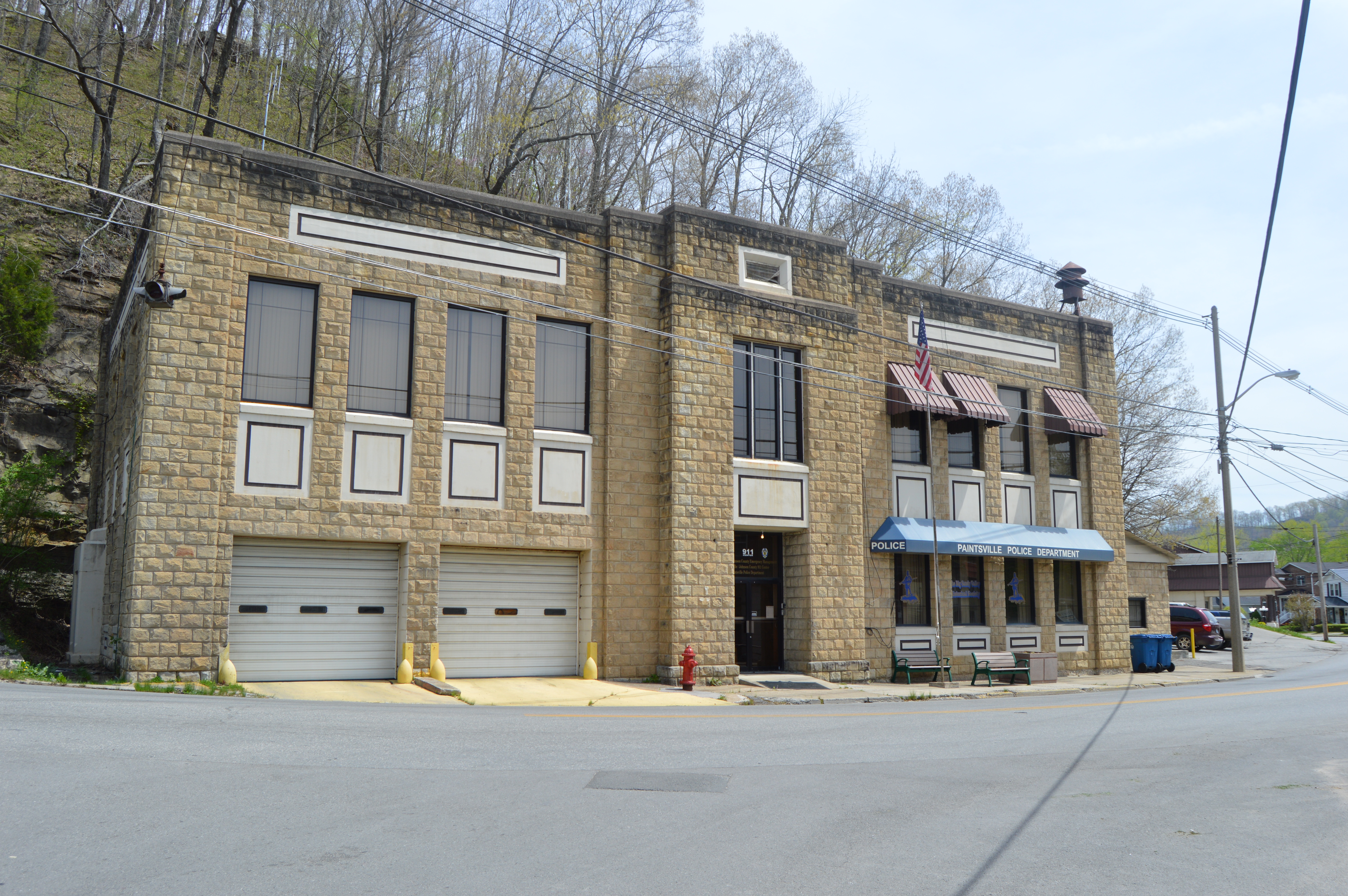
- Front and northern end

- Location within Kentucky Location within the United States
- Location: Paintsville, Kentucky
- Coordinates: 37°48′54″N 82°48′9″W
- Area: .22 acres (0.089 ha)
- Built: 1940
- Architect: Works Progress Administration
- NRHP reference No.: 88003158
- Added to NRHP: January 26, 1989

Paintsville City Hall was completed in January 1940 by the WPA, in order to house the city government, fire department, and police department of Paintsville, Kentucky. The structure is located at 101 Euclid Avenue in downtown Paintsville. It was added to the National Register of Historic Places on January 26, 1989.

In 2007, most of the city's government offices were moved to the old Citizens National Bank Building, which is located at 75 Main Street.

== See also ==
- National Register of Historic Places listings in Johnson County, Kentucky
