= Dispersed of Judah Cemetery =

Coordinates: 29°58′52″N 90°06′32″W

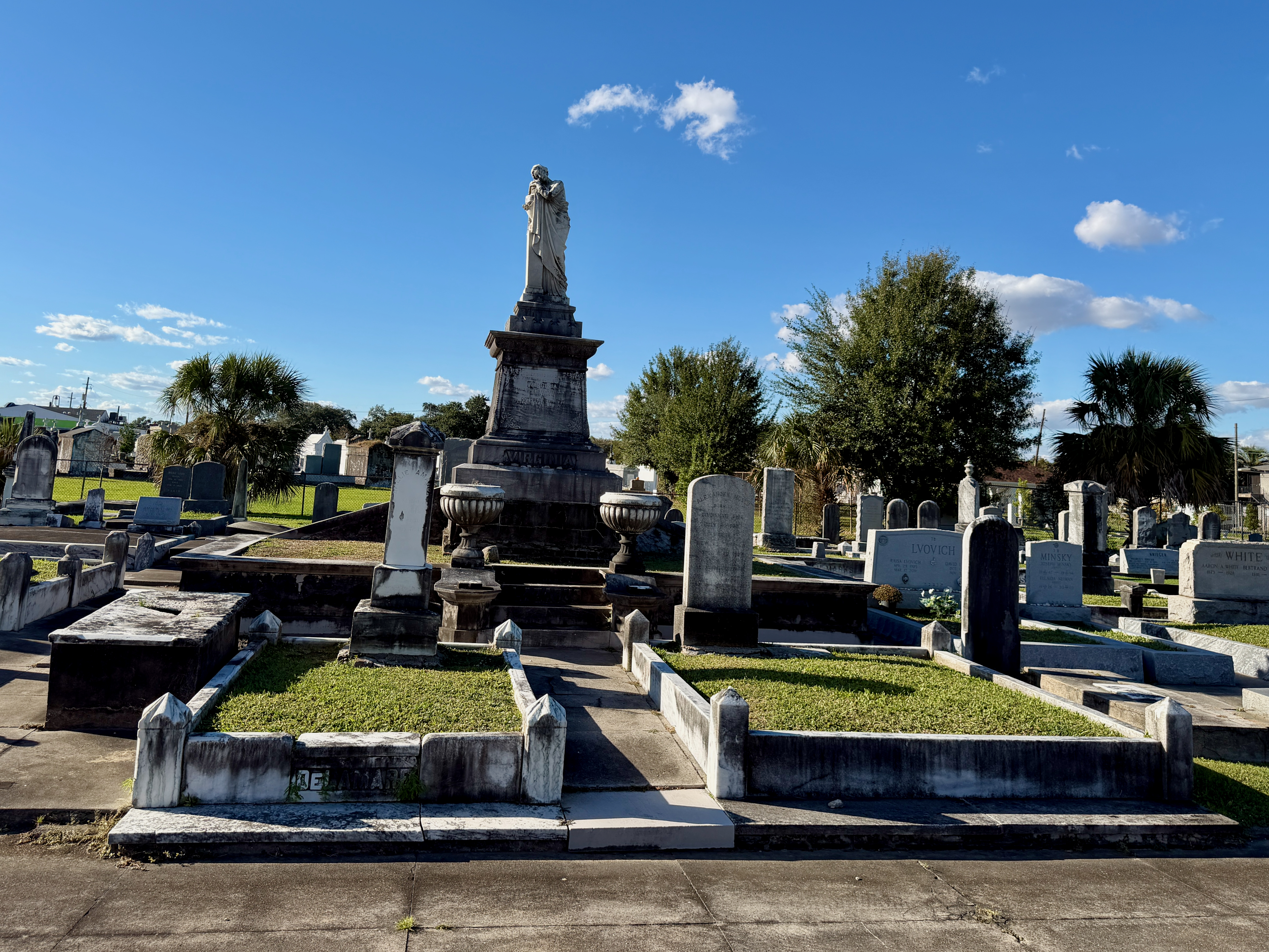

Details
- Established: 1846
- Location: New Orleans, Louisiana
- Country: United States
- Type: Private-Jewish
- Size: 17.5 acres
- No. of graves: ~1,400

The Dispersed of Judah Cemetery, located at 4901 Canal Street in New Orleans, Louisiana, is the second Jewish cemetery established in the city, having been founded in 1846. It is a 17.5-acre extant, private-Jewish cemetery and remains as the oldest surviving Jewish burial ground in New Orleans.

== Construction ==
The cemetery was established in 1846, immediately after the Sephardic congregation Nefuzoth Yehudah (Dispersed of Judah) was created with support from benefactor Judah Touro. That same year, property adjacent to St. Patrick Cemetery No. 2 along Canal Street was purchased and donated for the cemetery's creation. The layout incorporates below-ground burials. The grounds include numerous artistic features, marble sculptures, and tree stump memorials. The landscape includes trees, open spaces, and classical monuments. The cemetery also includes a special section reserved historically for suicide victims.

== Notable burials ==
- Benjamin F. Jonas (1834–1911) - U.S. Senator (1879–1885), first practicing Jew in the U.S. Senate
- Edwin Kursheedt (d. 1906) - merchant, benefactor
- Lilla Benjamin Wolf (d. 1911) - local funerary symbol
- Rebecca de Mendes Benjamin
Notable burials
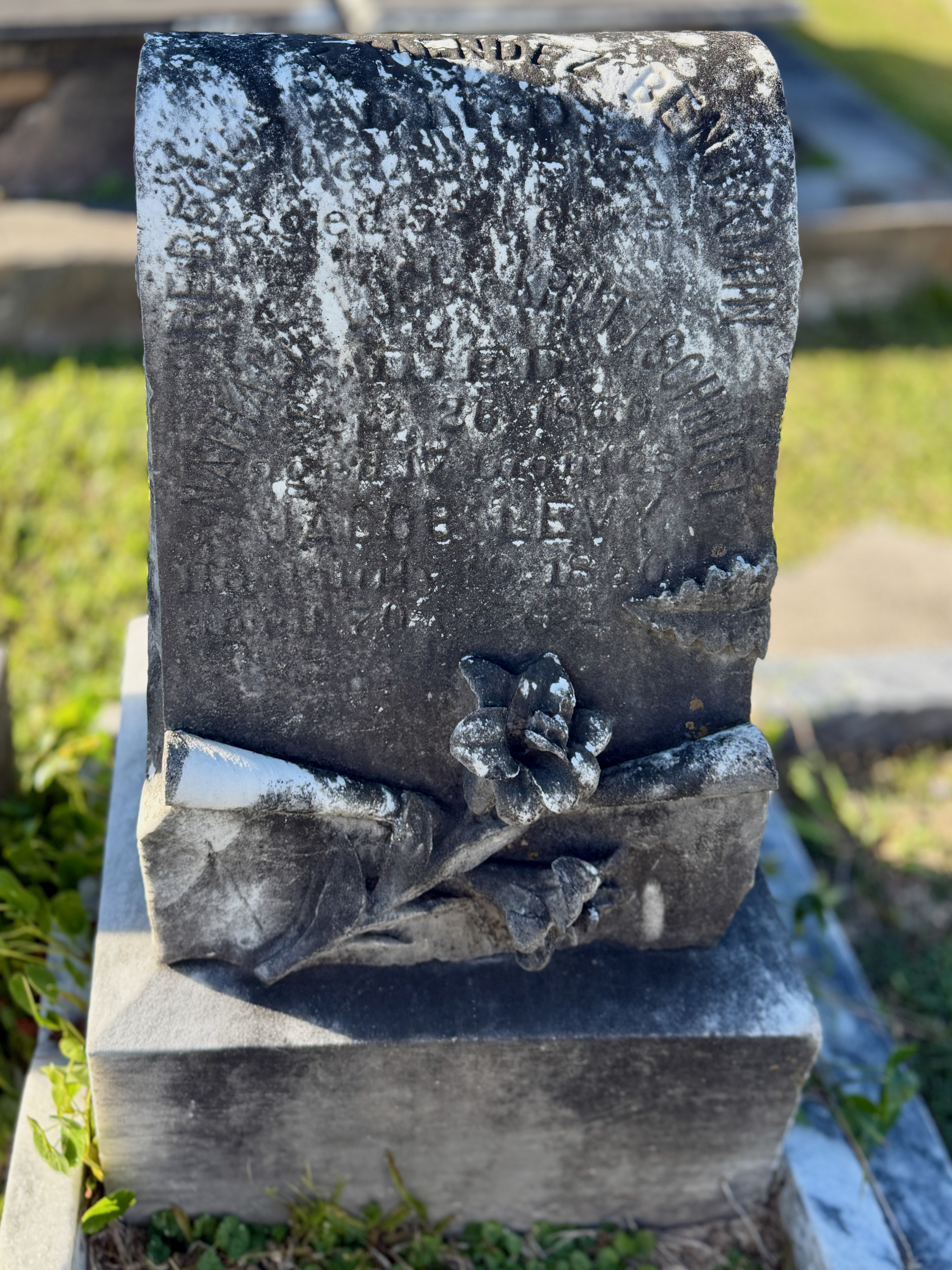
Rebecca de Mendes Benjamin

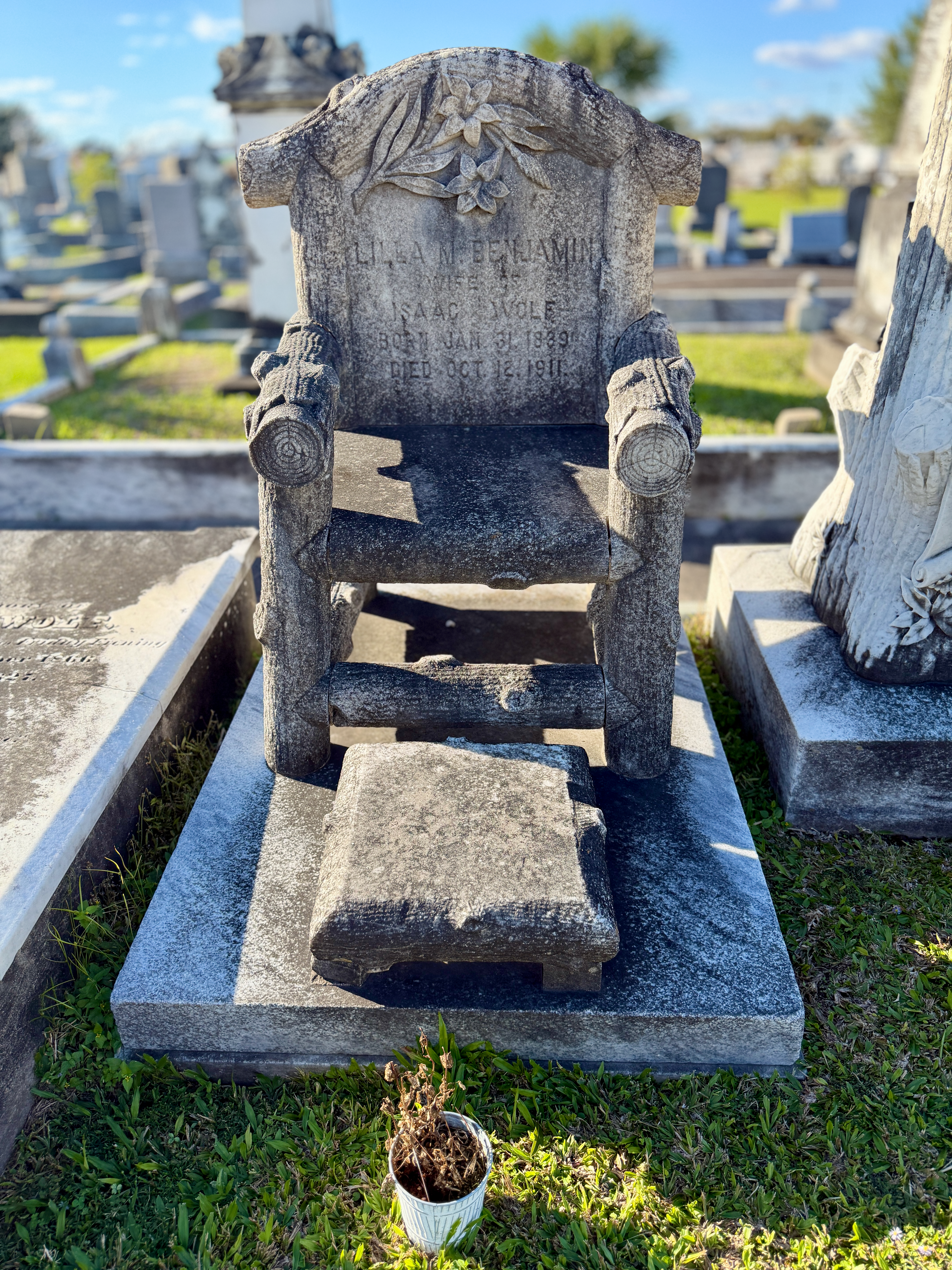
Lilla Benjamin Wolf
