= Johnson County Public Library =

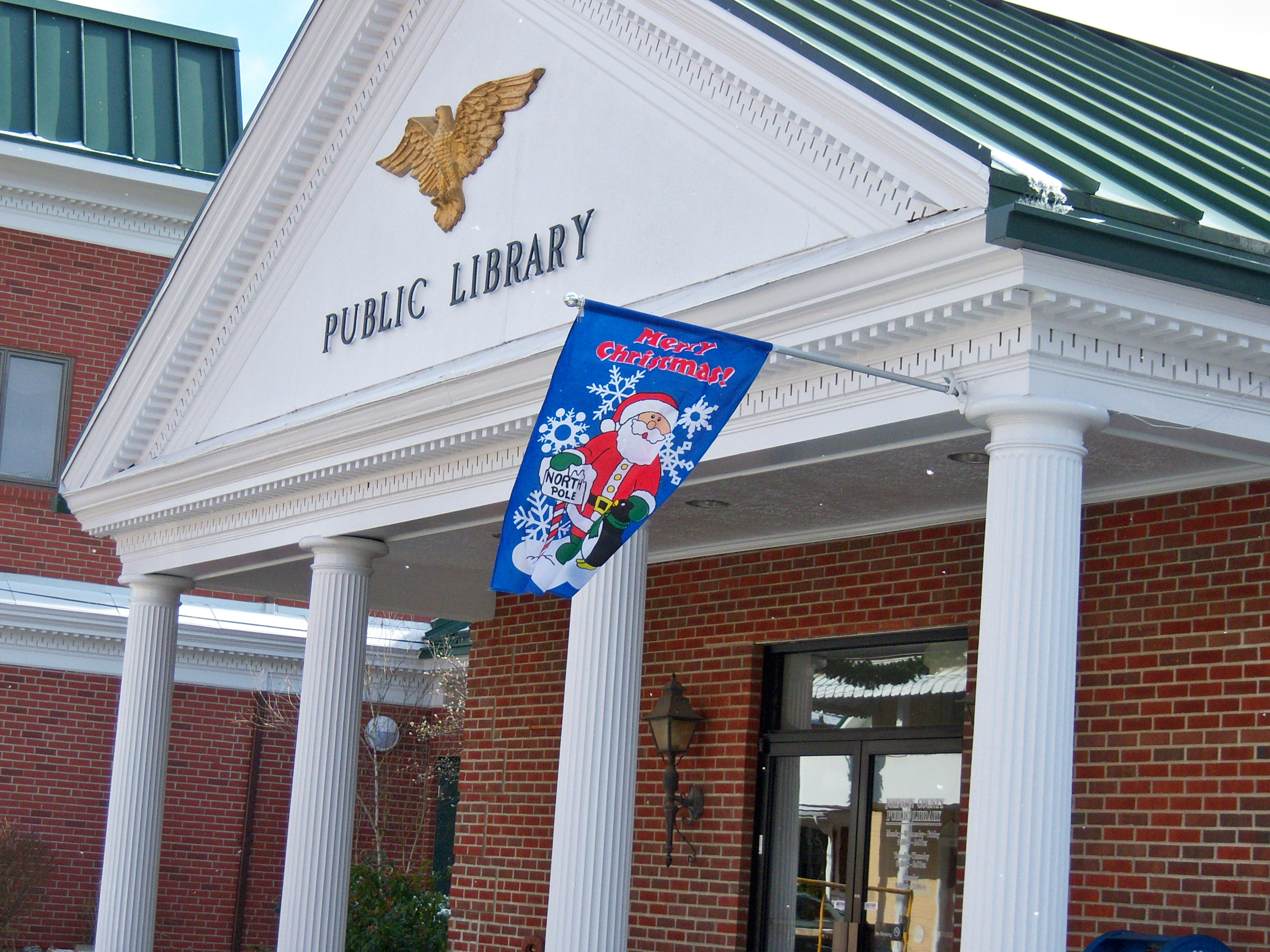
- 37.813374°N 82.8083°W
- Location: 444 Main Street, Paintsville, Kentucky 41240
- Type: Public Library
- Established: February 3, 1947

Collection
- Size: 44,236

Access and use
- Circulation: 120,687
- Population served: 23,827 (2009 est.)

Other information
- Director: Karen Daniel
- Employees: 8
- Website: johnsoncountypubliclibrary.org

The Johnson County Public Library is a public library serving the residents of Johnson County, Kentucky. The library's collection contains 44,236 volumes, serves a population of 23,827, and circulates 120,687 items annually. It is located at 444 Main Street in Paintsville, Kentucky and was established on February 3, 1947. Although the library lacks branch locations, it does operate a daily mobile book service.

== History ==
On December 20, 1938, the Johnson County Pack Horse Library was established, which is often considered the precursor to the modern Johnson County Public Library. The program was headquartered in a room in the historic Mayo Mansion and was operated by May Stafford. Stafford, along with many other women, circulated books throughout the county on horseback until the establishment of the Johnson County Public Library on February 3, 1947. It was housed in the former Paintsville Public Library Building until the 1960s when the library moved into its current location on Main Street in Paintsville.

== Patricia Patton Kentucky Room ==
The Patricia Patton Kentucky Room contains numerous items on local history including census records, photographs, and legal documents. There is also a microfilm collection of both The Paintsville Herald and The Big Sandy News.
