= Paintsville Lake =

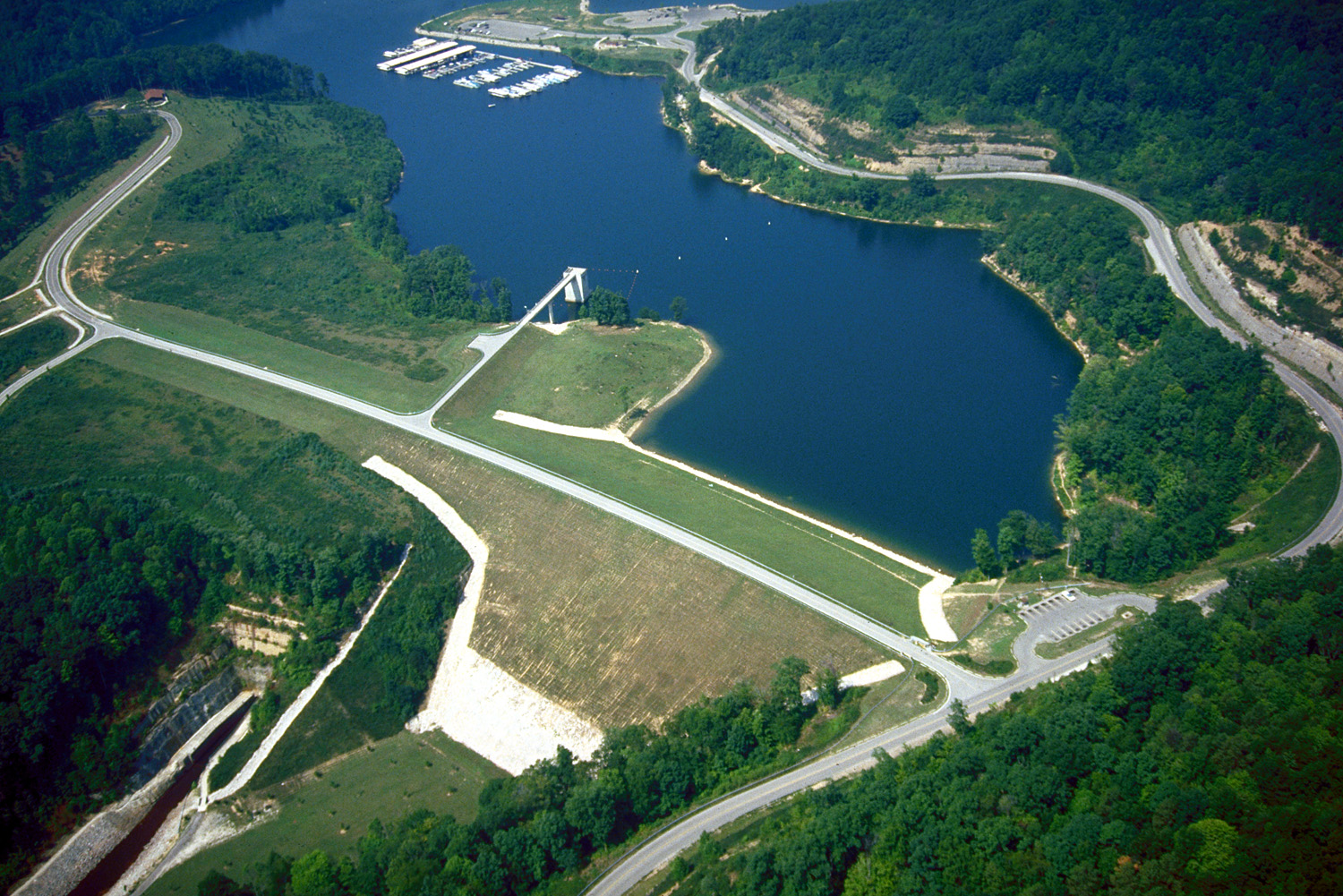
- Lake and Dam

- Location within Kentucky
- Location: Johnson and Morgan Counties, Kentucky
- Coordinates: 37°50′23.34″N 82°52′15.56″W
- Type: reservoir
- Primary inflows: Paint Creek
- Primary outflows: Paint Creek
- Basin countries: United States
- Max. length: 26 miles (42 km)
- Surface area: 1,139 acres (4.61 km^{2})
- Max. depth: 100 feet (30 m)
- Water volume: 40,700 acre-feet (50,200,000 m^{3})
- Shore length^{1}: 57 miles (92 km)
- Surface elevation: 709 feet (216 m)
- ^{1} Shore length is not a well-defined measure.

Paintsville Lake is a 1,139-acre (4.61 km^{2}) reservoir in Johnson and Morgan counties in eastern Kentucky. It was impounded from Paint Creek in 1983 by the United States Army Corps of Engineers. It is the major attraction of Paintsville Lake State Park.

== History ==
Paintsville Lake officially opened to the public in 1983, three years before Paintsville Lake State Park was established.

On December 9, 1978, ten-thousand Johnson County residents had to be evacuated from the area below the construction site of the Paintsville Lake dam. This is because the area had recently received eight inches (200 mm) of rain, which had caused a leak in the coffer dam that was keeping the construction site of the actual dam dry. The dam did not break, and the residents were allowed to return to their homes the following day.

== Fish species ==
Paintsville Lake has a variety of game fishing species. Fish that can be caught in the lake include:

- Largemouth bass
- Smallmouth bass
- Spotted bass
- Striped bass
- Channel catfish
- Flathead Catfish
- Black crappie
- Rainbow trout
- Brown Trout
- Sunfish
- Perch
- Walleye
- White crappie

== Gallery ==
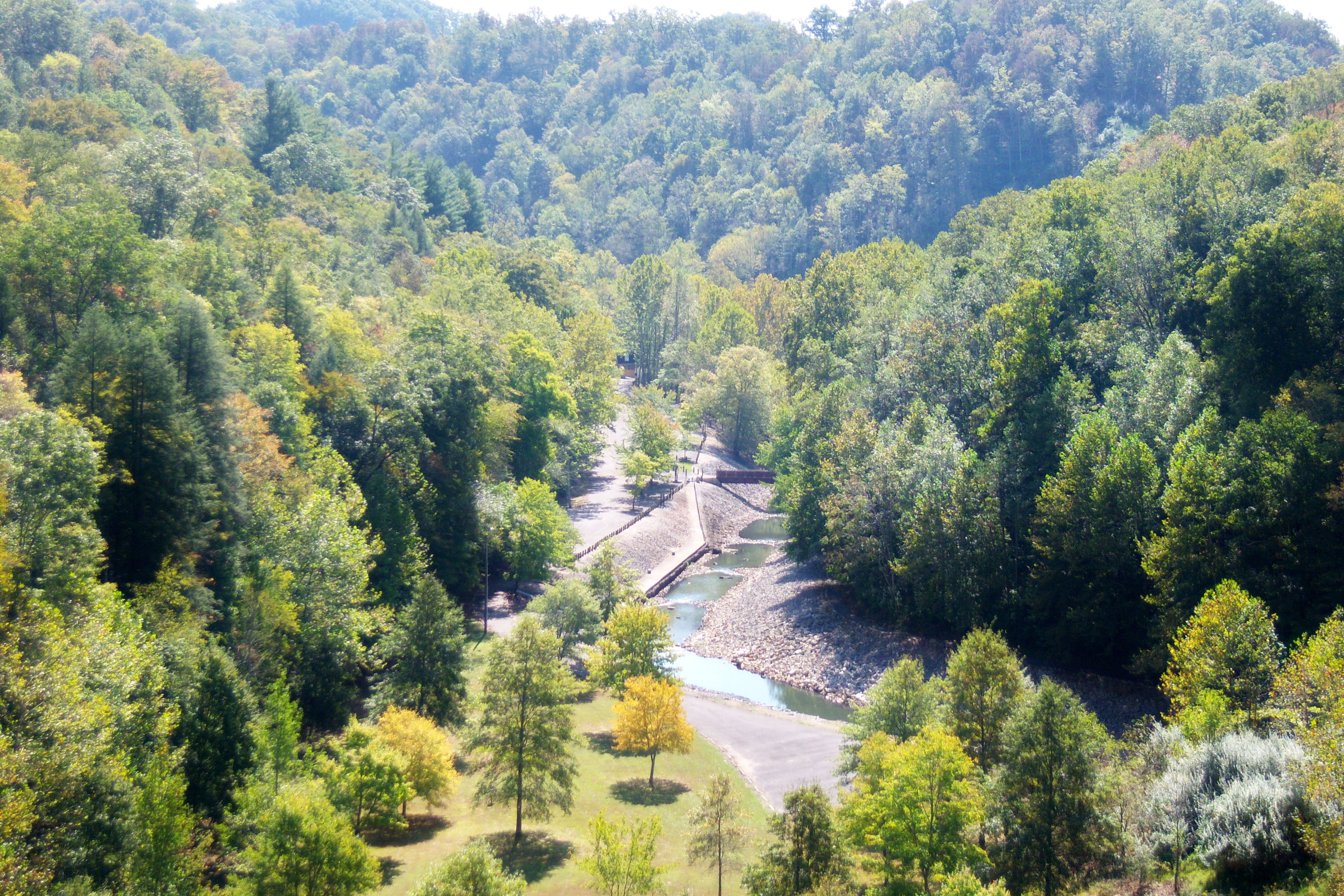
Paintsville Lake spillway

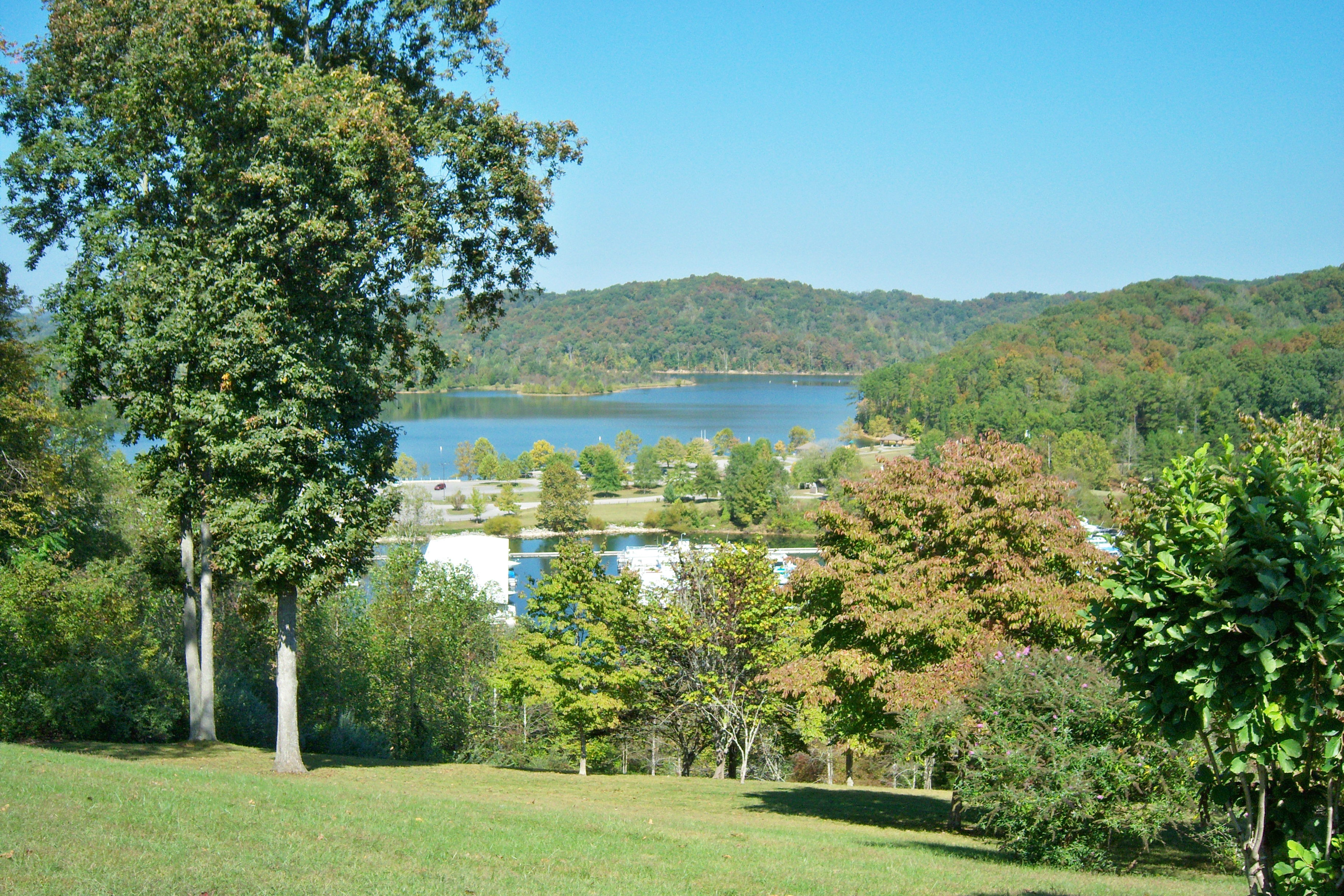
Rocky Knob Recreational Area

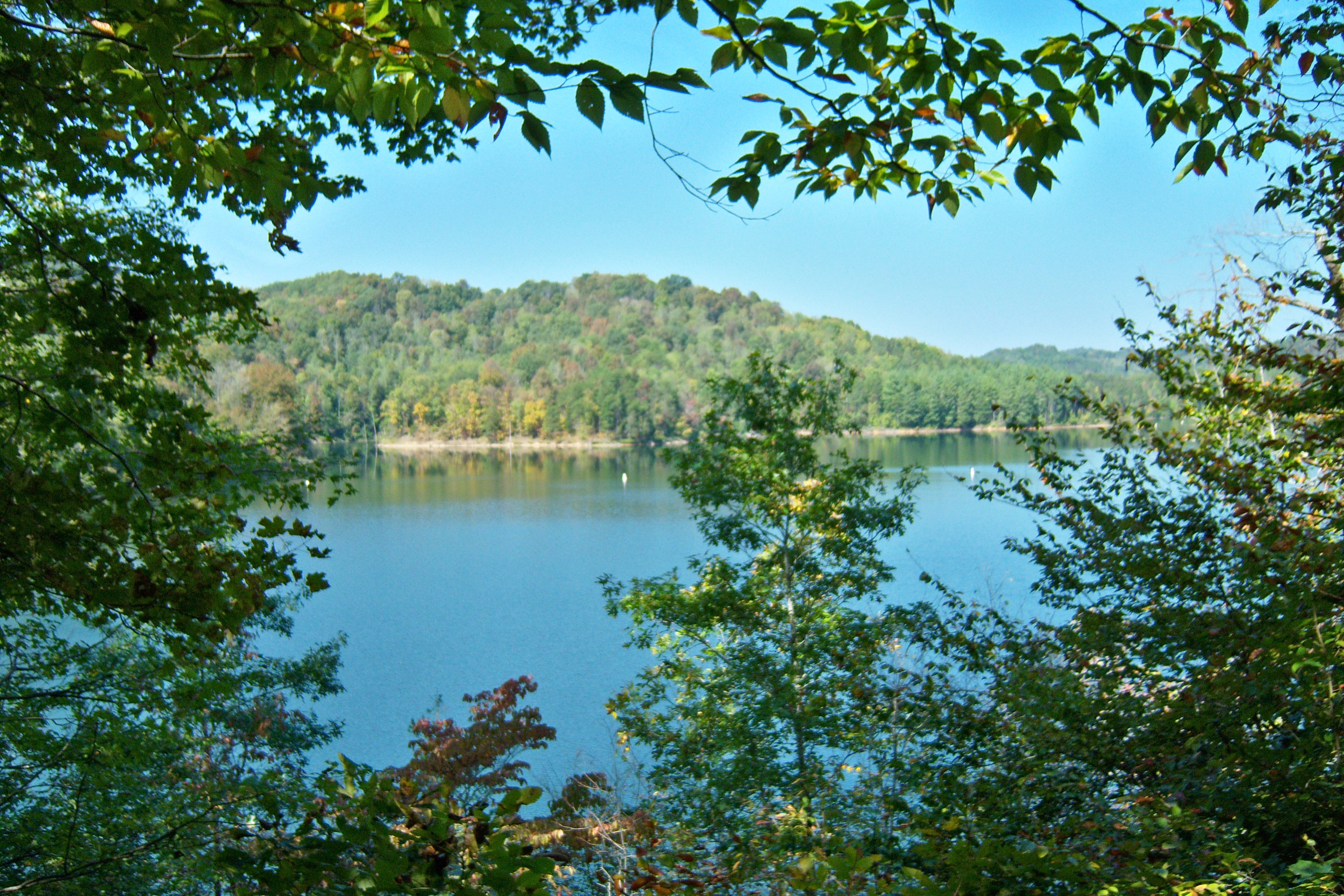
Paintsville Lake as viewed from the Kiwanis Trail

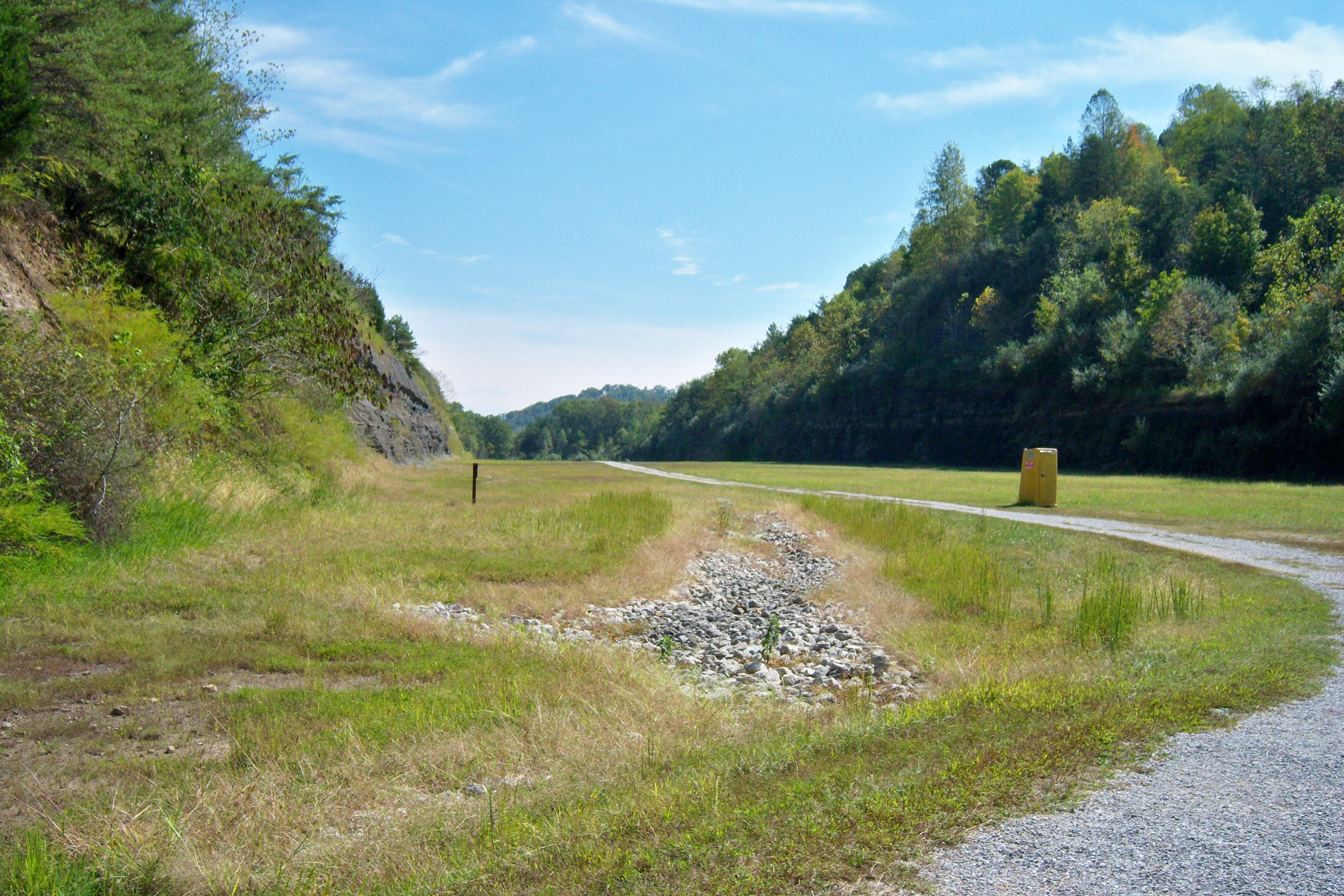
Paintsville Lake's emergency spillway

== See also ==
- Paintsville Lake State Park
