= H.B. Rice Insurance Building =

- U.S. National Register of Historic Places
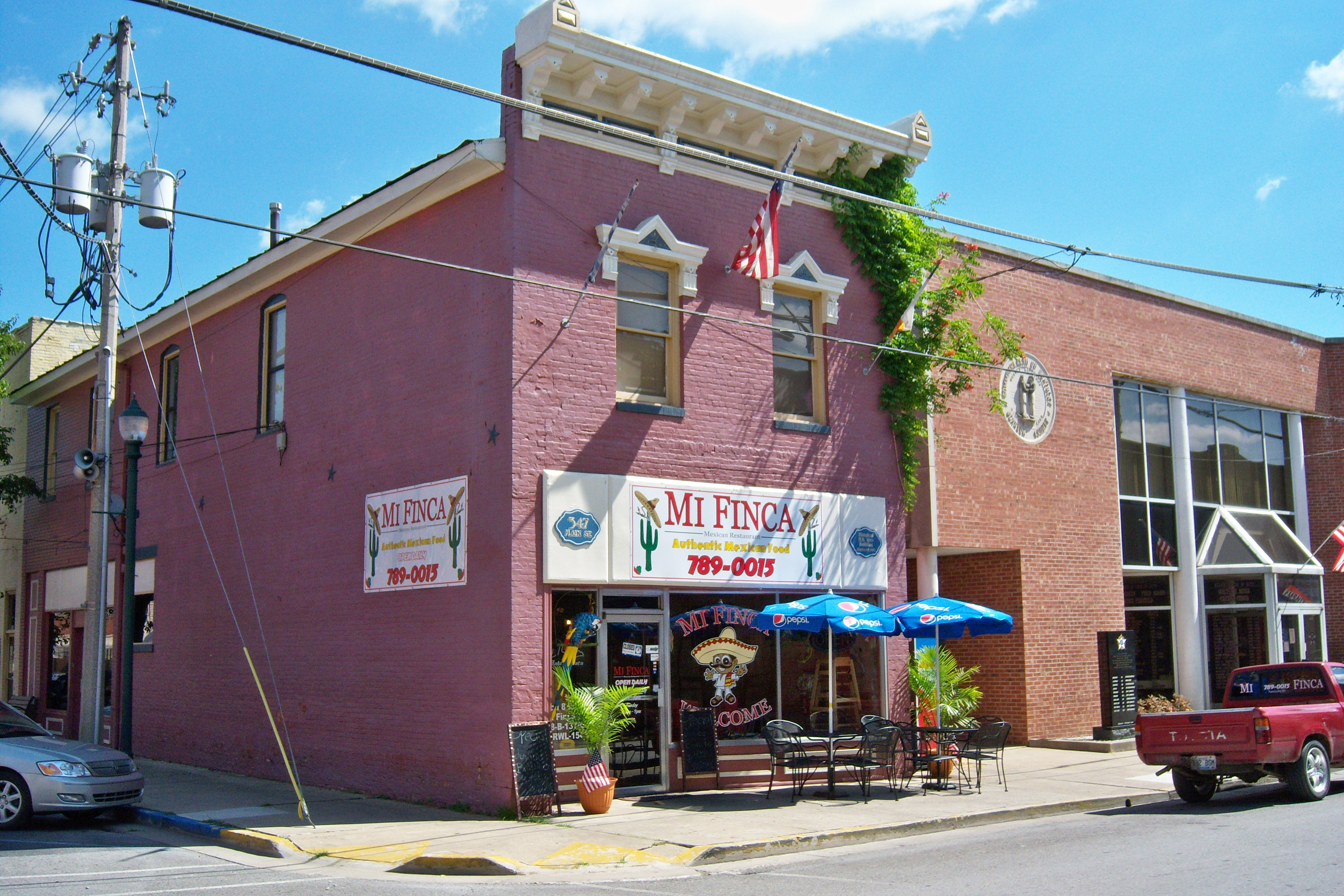

- Location within Kentucky Location within the United States
- Location: 347 Main St., Paintsville, Kentucky
- Coordinates: 37°48′49″N 82°48′25″W
- Area: .03 acres (0.012 ha)
- Built: 1890
- Architectural style: Italianate, Gothic
- NRHP reference No.: 88003157
- Added to NRHP: January 26, 1989

The H.B. Rice Insurance Building is a historic building located in Paintsville, Kentucky, United States. The building was constructed in 1890 by Harvey Burns Rice, who in 1908, opened an insurance company in the building. It was added to the National Register of Historic Places on January 29, 1989.

The building is currently occupied by a local Mexican restaurant chain.
