= Asa, Kentucky =

Unincorporated community in Kentucky, United States

- Unincorporated community
- Location within Kentucky Location within the United States
- Coordinates: 37°46′04″N 82°54′15″W
- Country: United States
- State: Kentucky
- County: Johnson
- Elevation: 772 ft (235 m)
- Time zone: UTC-5 (Eastern (EST))
  - Summer (DST): UTC-4 (EDT)
- GNIS feature ID: 507419

Asa is an unincorporated community in Johnson County, Kentucky, United States. It is located at an elevation of 772 feet (220 m). Asa is located in the 41222 ZIP Code Tabulation Area. Weekly happenings in Asa are chronicled in Elaine Brown's Asa Creek News column in The Paintsville Herald.
