= Paintsville Lake State Park =

State park in Kentucky, United States

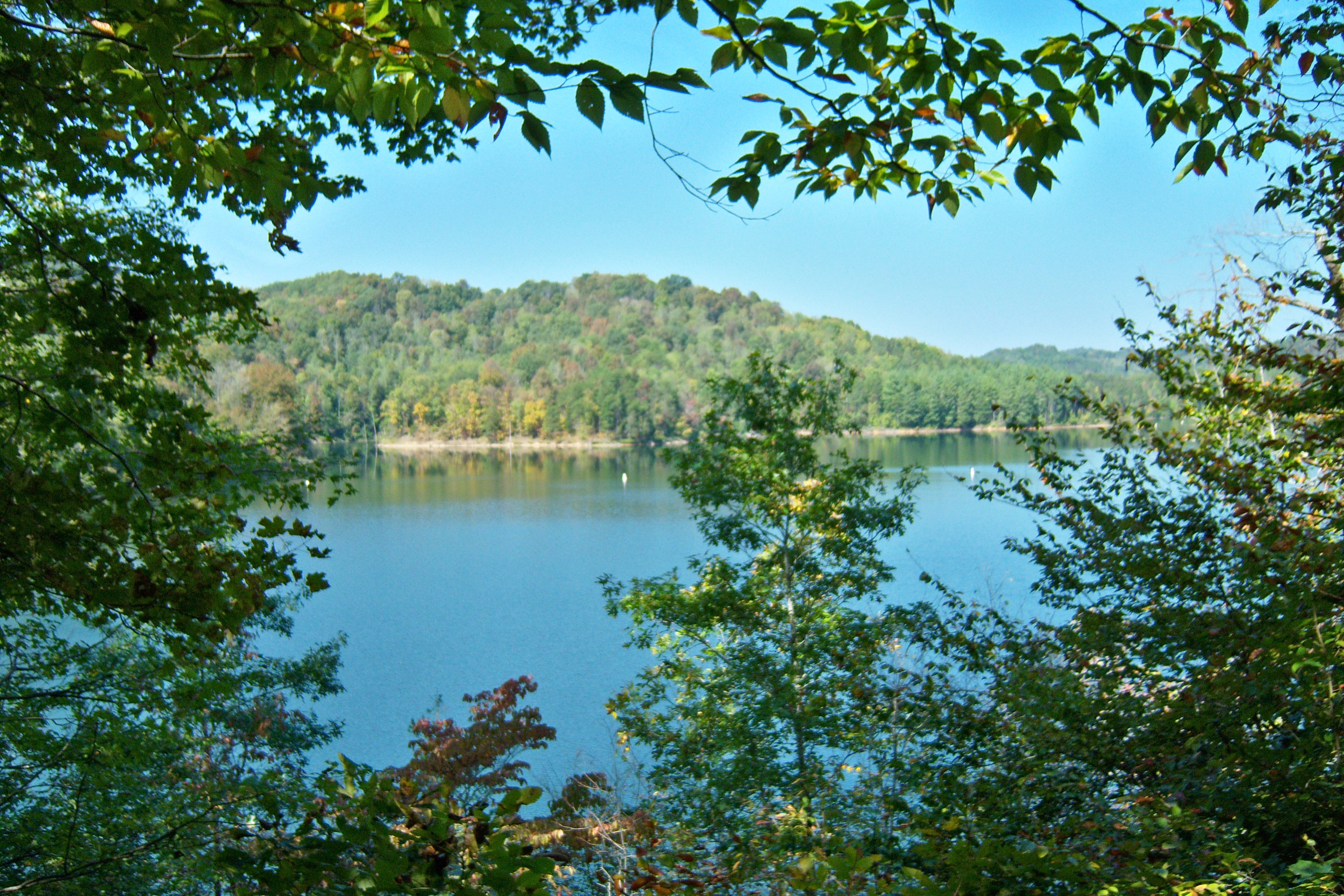
- Paintsville Lake

- Location within Kentucky Location within the United States
- Type: Kentucky state park
- Location: Johnson County, Kentucky
- Coordinates: 37°50′23.34″N 82°52′15.56″W
- Area: 242 acres (98 ha)
- Created: 1986
- Operator: Kentucky Department of Parks
- Status: Open year-round
- Website: Official website

Paintsville Lake State Park is a park located just west of Paintsville, Kentucky in Johnson County. The park itself encompasses 242 acres (98 ha), while Paintsville Lake, its major feature, covers approximately 1,139 acres (461 ha) extending into parts of Morgan County.

The park contains thirty-two developed campsites, ten primitive campsites, a playground, four picnic shelters, a four lane launch ramp, an amphitheater, a restaurant, a marina, and a Kiwanis Trail, a National Recreation Trail. The park also contains the Mountain Homeplace, which is a replica of a small farming community in Eastern Kentucky between 1850 and 1900, and has an adjacent 12,103-acre (4,898 ha) wildlife management area.

== Gallery ==
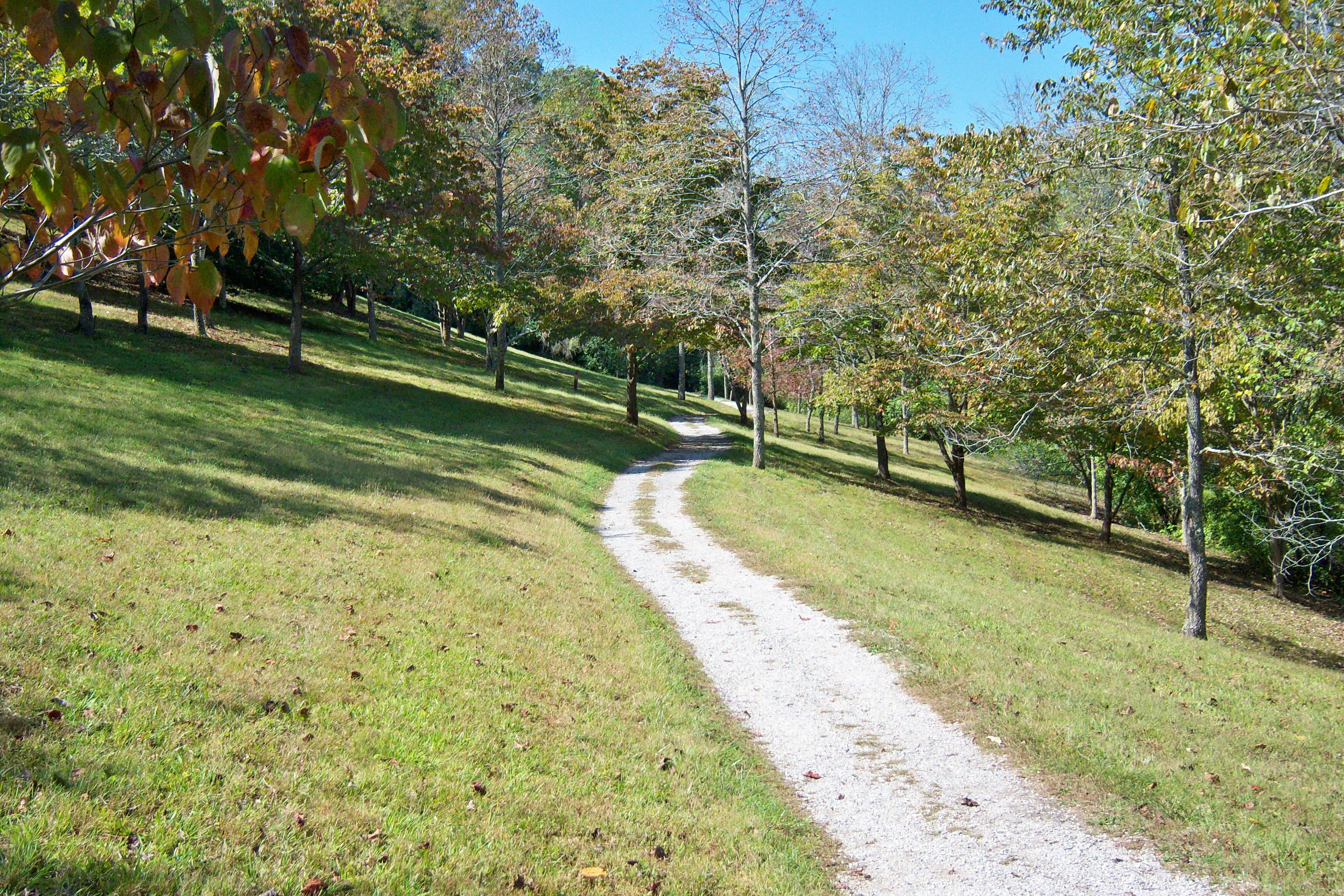
The Kiwanis Trail

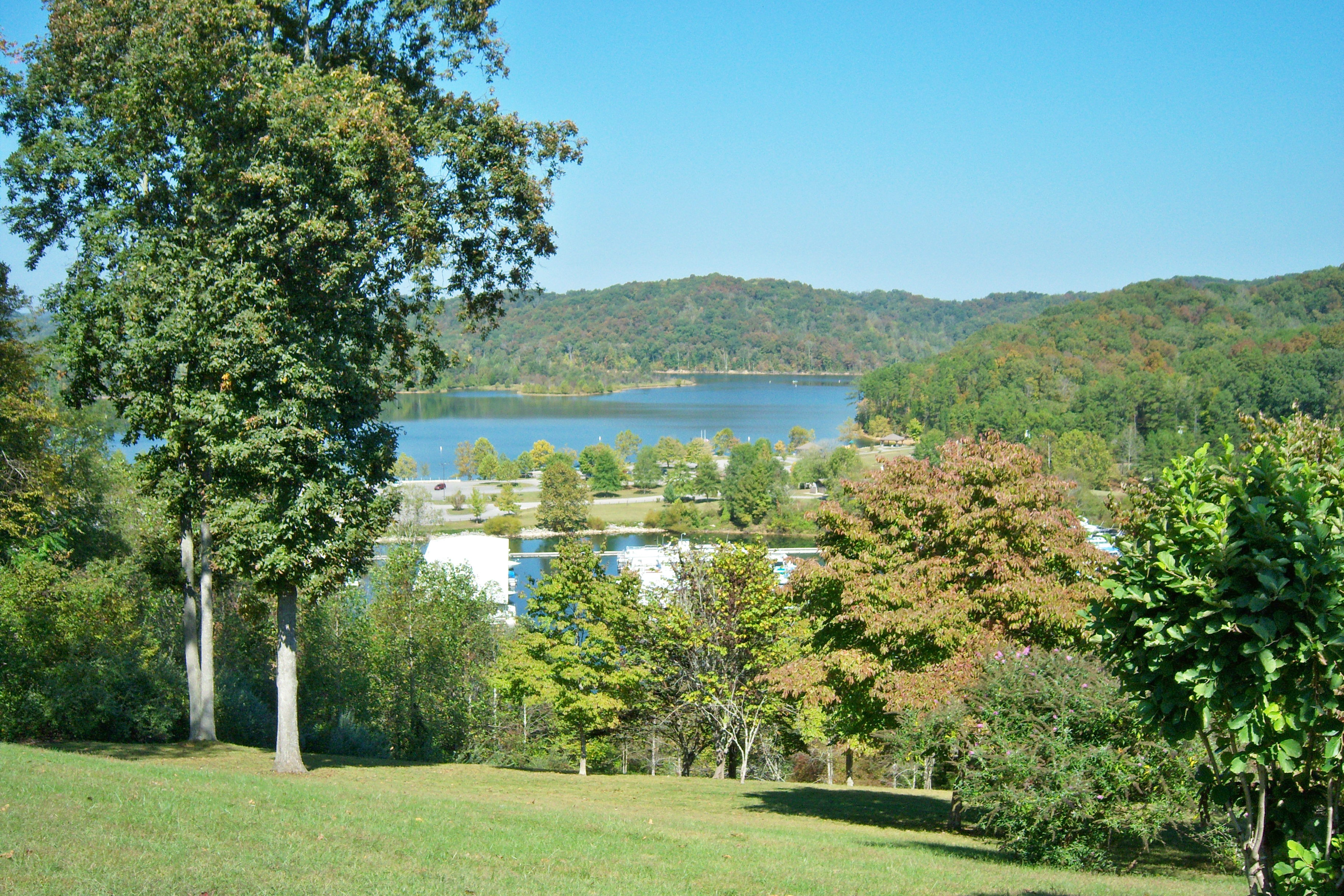
Rocky Knob Recreational Area

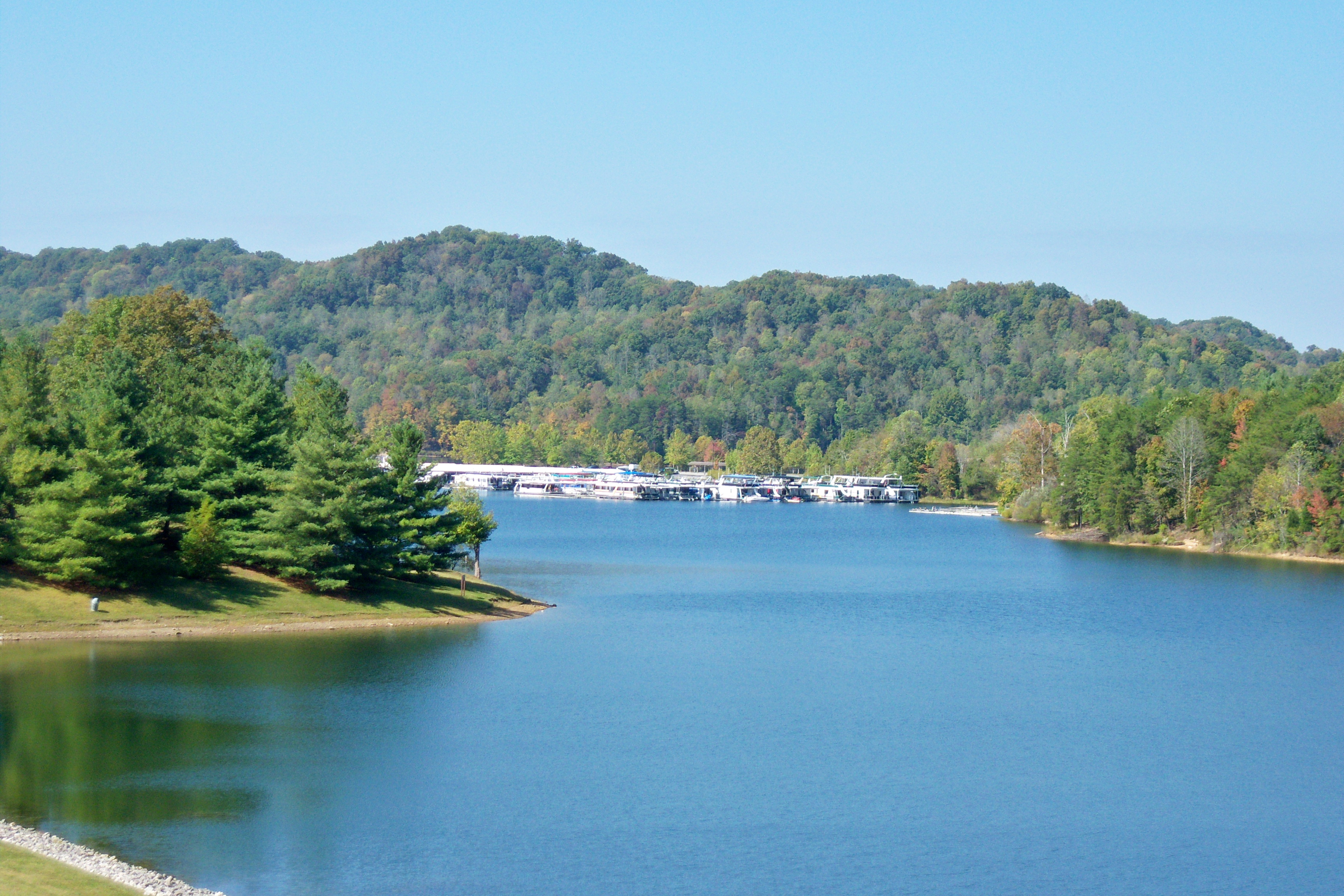
Paintsville Lake and marina

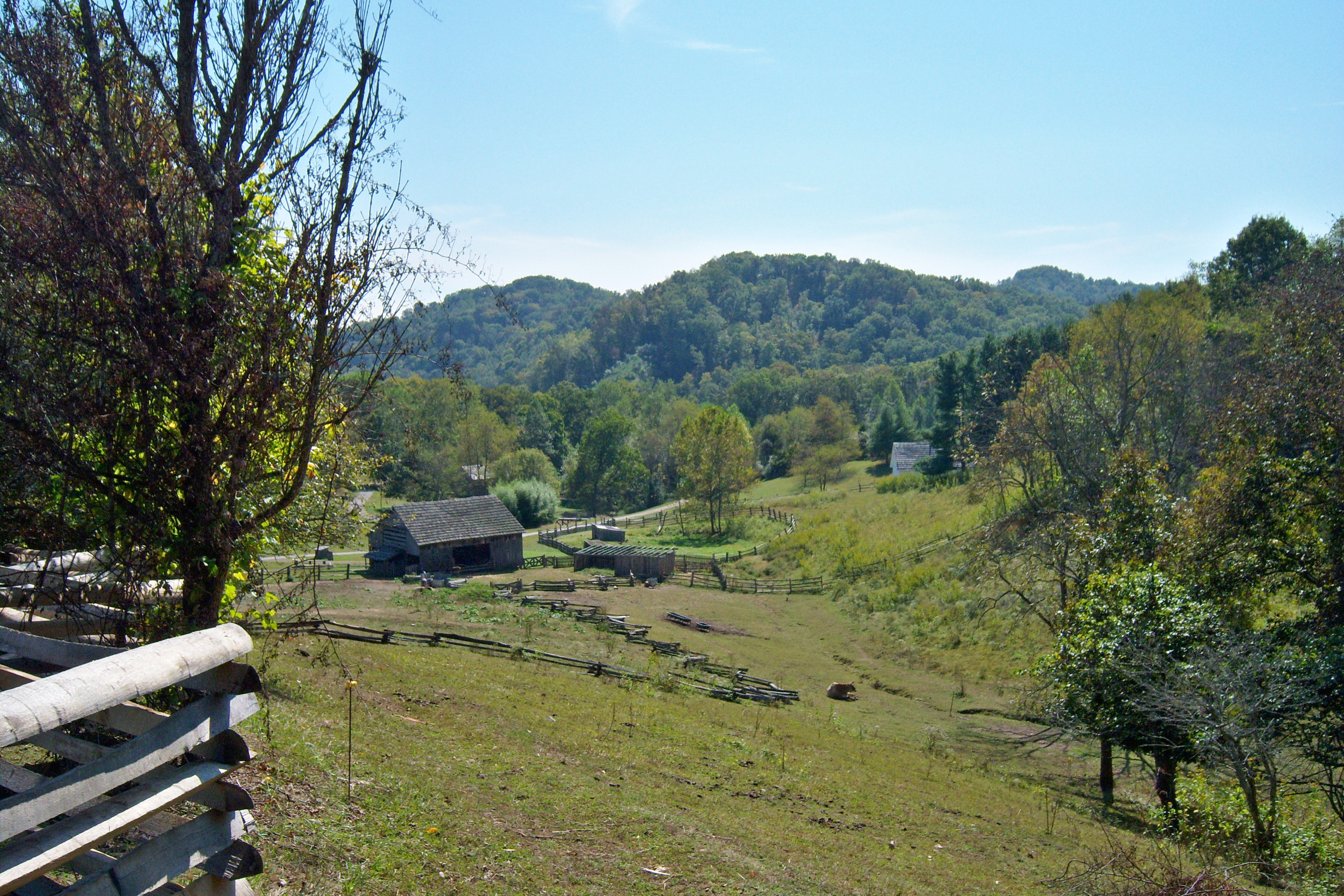
Mountain Homeplace
