= First Baptist Church (Paintsville, Kentucky) =

Historic church in Kentucky, United States

- U.S. National Register of Historic Places
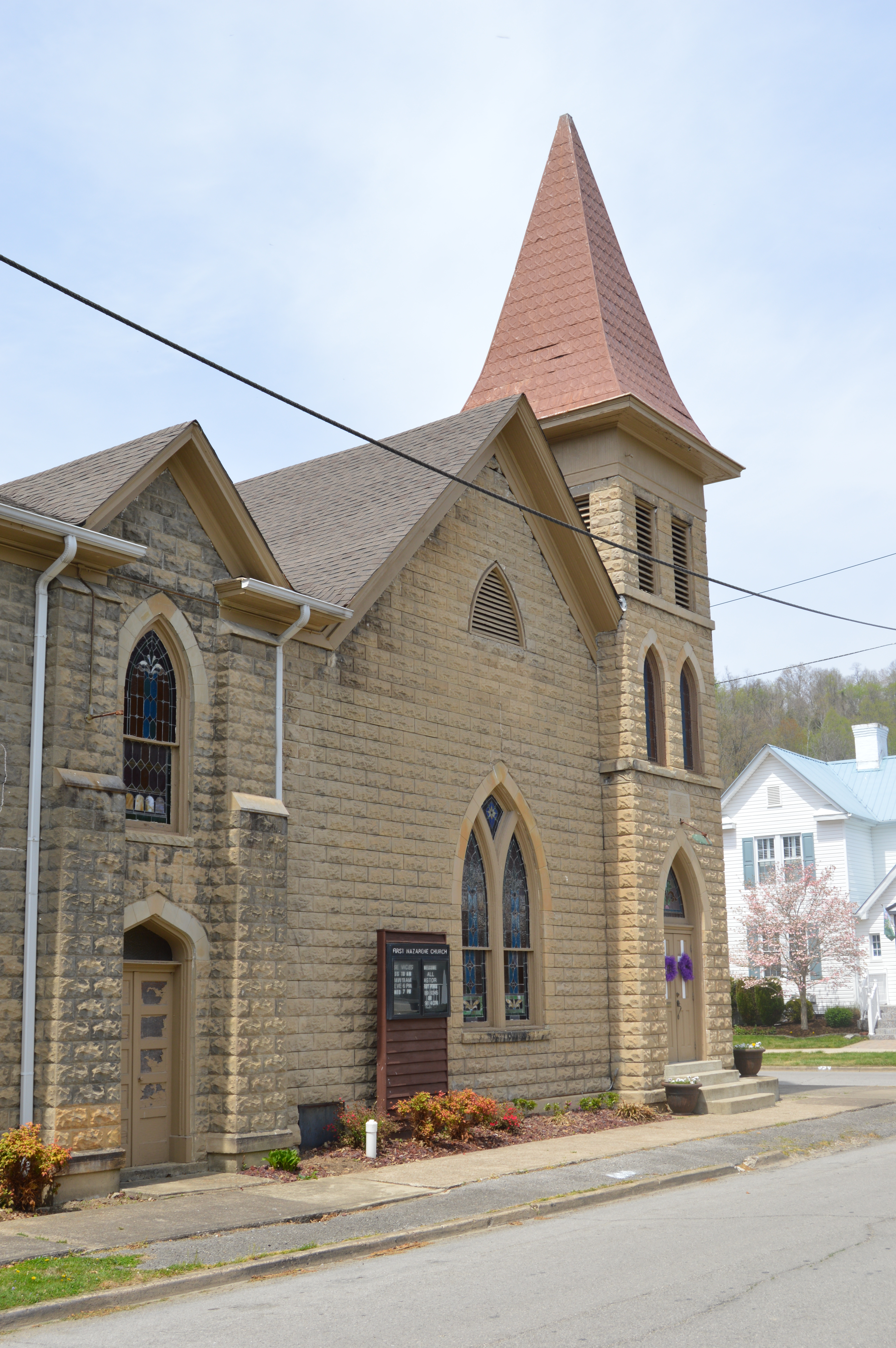
- Front of the original church

- Location within Kentucky Location within the United States
- Location: 330 College St., Paintsville, Kentucky
- Coordinates: 37°48′59″N 82°48′24″W
- Area: 0.1 acres (0.040 ha)
- Built: 1907
- Architect: Spradlin, Walter
- Architectural style: Late Gothic Revival
- Website: http://fbcpaintsville.com
- MPS: Johnson County MRA
- NRHP reference No.: 88003165
- Added to NRHP: January 26, 1989

First Baptist Church is a historic church on College Street in Paintsville, Kentucky.

== History ==
The original building was built in 1907 in a Late Gothic Revival style and added to the National Register in 1989. It was located on the corner of Fourth and College Street. The church occupied the building on Fourth Street until October 1, 1967, when the church congregation moved into the present structure on the corner of Third and College Streets.

== Associations ==
First Baptist Church Paintsville is associated with the Enterprise Association of Southern Baptists, Kentucky Baptist Convention as well as the Southern Baptist Convention and is a member of the Paintsville Ministerial Association.
