= Paintsville Public Library Building =

- Paintsville Public Library
- U.S. National Register of Historic Places
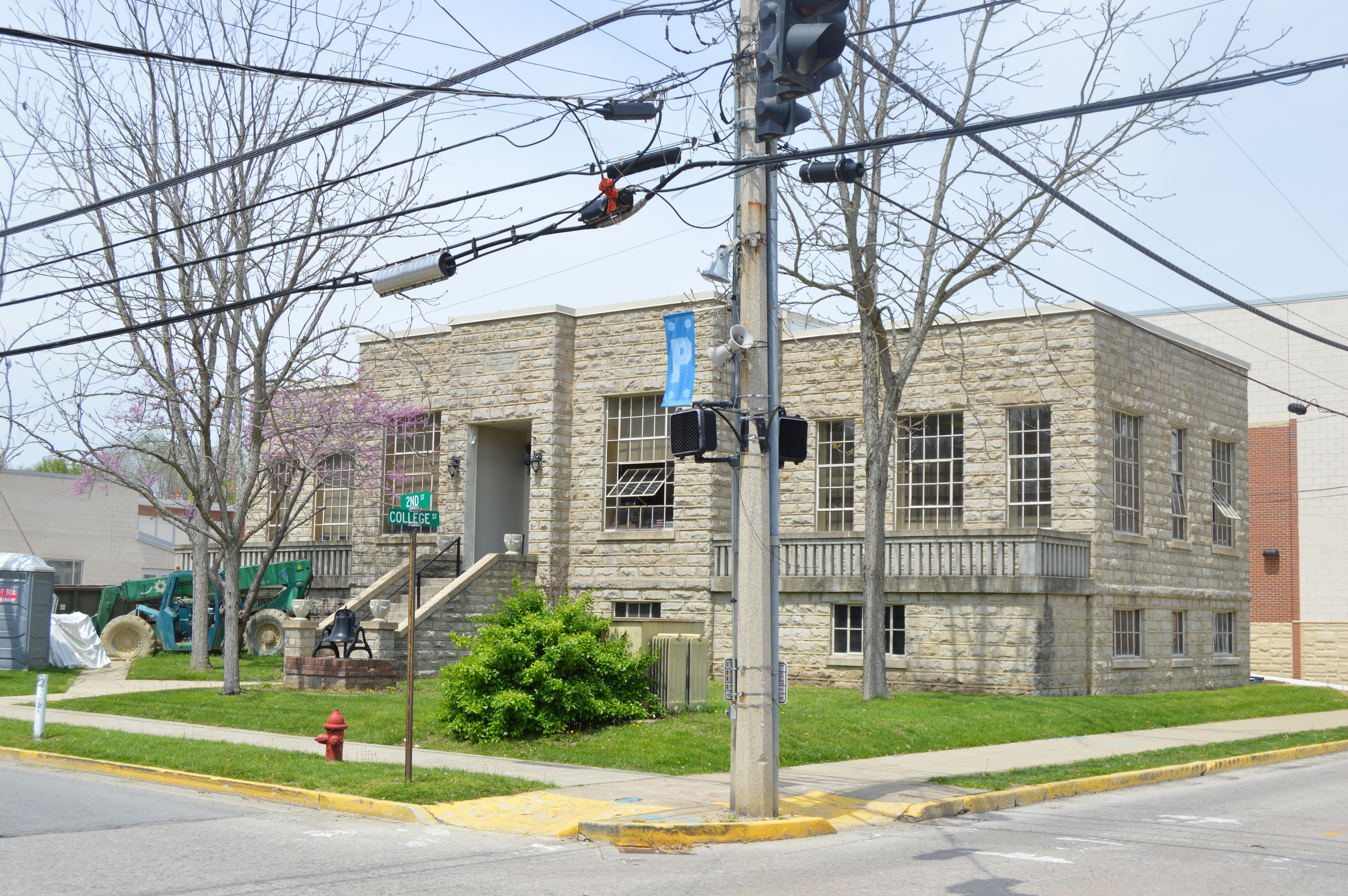
- Front and eastern side

- Location within Kentucky Location within the United States
- Location: Second St., Paintsville, Kentucky
- Coordinates: 37°48′55″N 82°48′23″W
- Area: 0.3 acres (0.12 ha)
- Built: 1934
- Architect: WPA
- Architectural style: Classical Revival
- MPS: Johnson County MRA
- NRHP reference No.: 88003164
- Added to NRHP: January 26, 1989

The Paintsville Public Library Building is a historic building located at 305 Second Street in Paintsville, Kentucky. It was constructed by the WPA in 1934. The library closed in the 1940s and was replaced by the Johnson County Public Library on February 3, 1947, which utilized the building until the 1960s. It was added to the National Register of Historic Places on January 26, 1989. It now serves as the board of education for the Paintsville Independent School District.
