= Stambaugh, Kentucky =

Unincorporated community in Kentucky, United States

- Unincorporated community
- Location within Kentucky Location within the United States
- Coordinates: 37°50′30″N 82°45′44″W
- Country: United States
- State: Kentucky
- County: Johnson
- Elevation: 830 ft (250 m)
- Time zone: UTC-5 (Eastern (EST))
  - Summer (DST): UTC-4 (EDT)
- ZIP codes: 41257

Stambaugh, Kentucky is a residential community with US Post Office located in Johnson County, Kentucky, United States. The community received its name when Stambaugh's post office was established on February 28, 1905, in honor of Bessie L. Stambaugh, Postmaster. Bessie Stambaugh's relatives Samuel and Philip Stambaugh were two of the area's first settlers. Its ZIP Code is 41257.

Stambaugh is located at an elevation of 830 feet (253 m) and has an estimated population of 501.
