= Williamsport, Kentucky =

Unincorporated community in Kentucky, United States

- Unincorporated community
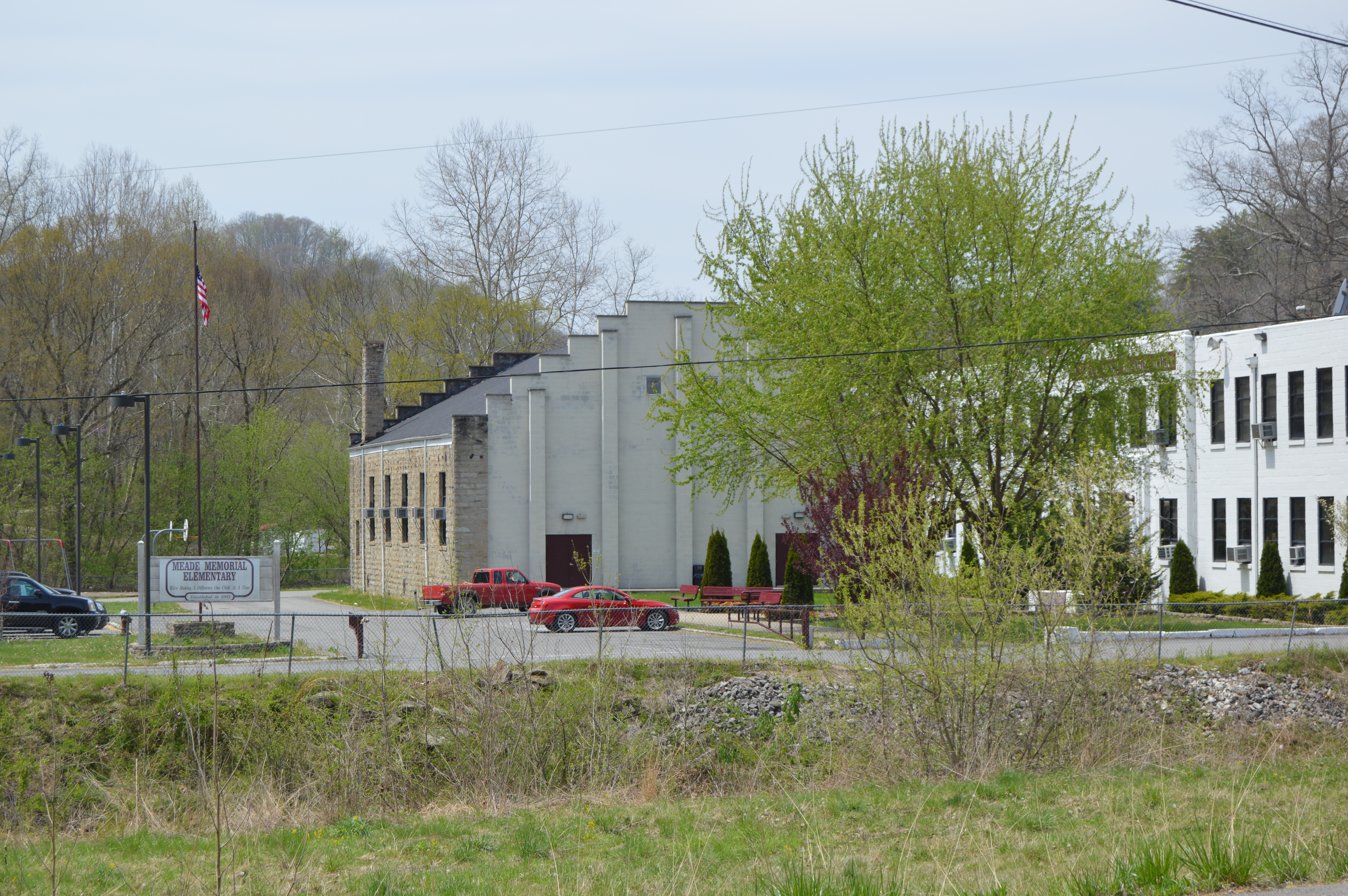
- Meade Memorial School

- Location within Kentucky Location within the United States
- Coordinates: 37°49′14″N 82°43′45″W
- Country: United States
- State: Kentucky
- County: Johnson
- Elevation: 656 ft (200 m)
- Time zone: UTC-5 (Eastern (EST))
  - Summer (DST): UTC-4 (EDT)
- ZIP codes: 41271
- GNIS feature ID: 506836

Williamsport is an unincorporated community and coal town in Johnson County, Kentucky, United States. Its ZIP code is 41271.
